= Latter-day Saint settlements in Canada =

The following communities were founded by the Church of Jesus Christ of Latter-day Saints (LDS Church) in Alberta:

- 1887 — Cardston
- 1888 — Aetna
- 1890 — Mountain View
- 1891 — Beazer
- 1893 — Leavitt
- 1897 — Kimball
- 1898 — Caldwell, Magrath, Stirling, Taylorville
- 1901 — Orton, Raymond
- 1902 — Frankburg, Taber
- 1908 — Glenwood
- 1910 — Hillspring

The following communities were founded by LDS Church members or missionaries:

- Woolford
- Jefferson
- Del Bonita

== See also ==
- Mormon colonies in Mexico
- Mormon Corridor
- Mormon Trail (Canada)
- The Church of Jesus Christ of Latter-day Saints in Canada
