= Alberta Highway 501 =

Highway in Alberta, Canada

Highway 501
- Highway 501 highlighted in red

Route information
- Maintained by Alberta Transportation
- Length: 304.2 km (189.0 mi)

Major junctions
- West end: Highway 5 near Mountain View
- Highway 2 in Cardston; Highway 4 in Milk River; Highway 41 in Cypress County
- East end: Highway 13 at Saskatchewan border

Location
- Country: Canada
- Province: Alberta
- Specialized and rural municipalities: Cardston County, Warner County No. 5, Forty Mile County No. 8, Cypress County
- Towns: Cardston, Milk River

Highway system
- Alberta Numbered Highway Network; List; Former
← Highway 500	→ Highway 503

Alberta Provincial Highway No. 501, commonly referred to as Highway 501, is a highway in the province of Alberta, Canada. It runs west–east from Highway 5 east of Mountain View as gravel to Cardston, then pavement through Del Bonita and Milk River to Highway 879, then gravel again to the Saskatchewan border.

It is also known as 9 Avenue in Cardston, and Centre Avenue in Milk River. From Highway 889, on through to Saskatchewan, it follows the path of the Red Coat Trail.

The section of Highway 501 between Cardston and the ghost town of Whiskey Gap was originally designated as part of Highway 40, where Highway 40 continued south to the Canada–United States border. The Highway 40 designation was removed in the early 1970s.

== Cardston bypass ==
The Cardston truck bypass is officially designated as part of Highway 501 but it unsigned. The signed designation follows 9th Avenue through Cardston, and then follows a short concurrency with Highway 2.

== Major intersections ==
From west to east:

Rural/specialized municipality	Location	km	mi	Destinations	Notes
Cardston County		0.0	0.0	Highway 5 – Waterton Park, Cardston	West of Mountain View
Cardston County	Beazer	6.0	3.7		
Cardston		22.4	13.9	12 Street W / 9 Avenue W	Highway 501 follows 9 Avenue W
Cardston		24.6	15.3	Highway 2 (Main Street)	
Cardston		Gap in route			
Cardston		26.1	16.2	Highway 2 (Main Street) / Highway 5 (1 Avenue W) – Waterton Park, Fort Macleod, Lethbridge	Highway 501 follows 1 Avenue E; north end of Highway 2 Truck Bypass (unsigned Highway 501)
Cardston County		30.6	19.0	Highway 2 – Cardston, Carway	South end of Highway 2 Truck Bypass (unsigned Highway 501)
Cardston County		Gap in route			
Cardston County		31.3	19.4	Highway 2 – Cardston, U.S. border, Browning	
Cardston County	Aetna	36.0	22.4		
Cardston County	Kimball	40.9	25.4	Crosses St. Mary River	
Cardston County	Taylorville	50.5	31.4	Township Road 11A / Range Road 241A	Former Highway 40
Cardston County		54.6	33.9	Highway 820 north – Spring Coulee	
Cardston County	Del Bonita	76.8	47.7	Highway 62 – Magrath, Cut Bank	
County of Warner No. 5		135.7	84.3	Highway 4 south – Coutts, Great Falls	West end of Highway 4 concurrency
County of Warner No. 5	Milk River	138.7	86.2	Highway 4 north – Lethbridge	East end of Highway 4 concurrency
County of Warner No. 5		161.3	100.2	Highway 877 north – Skiff	
County of Warner No. 5		171.9	106.8	Highway 500 south – Writing-on-Stone Provincial Park	
County of Forty Mile No. 8		191.5	119.0	Highway 879 north – Foremost	
County of Forty Mile No. 8		201.3	125.1	Highway 880 south – Aden	
County of Forty Mile No. 8		216.3	134.4	Highway 885 north – Etzikom	
County of Forty Mile No. 8		240.4	149.4	Highway 887 north – Orion	
County of Forty Mile No. 8		253.4	157.5	Highway 889 north (Red Coat Trail) to Highway 61 – Manyberries	West end of Red Coat Trail concurrency
Cypress County		285.8	177.6	Highway 41 – Medicine Hat, Havre	
Cypress County		304.2	189.0	Highway 13 east (Red Coat Trail) – Eastend, Shaunavon	Continues into Saskatchewan
1.000 mi = 1.609 km; 1.000 km = 0.621 mi: Concurrency terminus; Route transition
