= Mormon Trail (Canada) =

Canadian trail with national historic sites

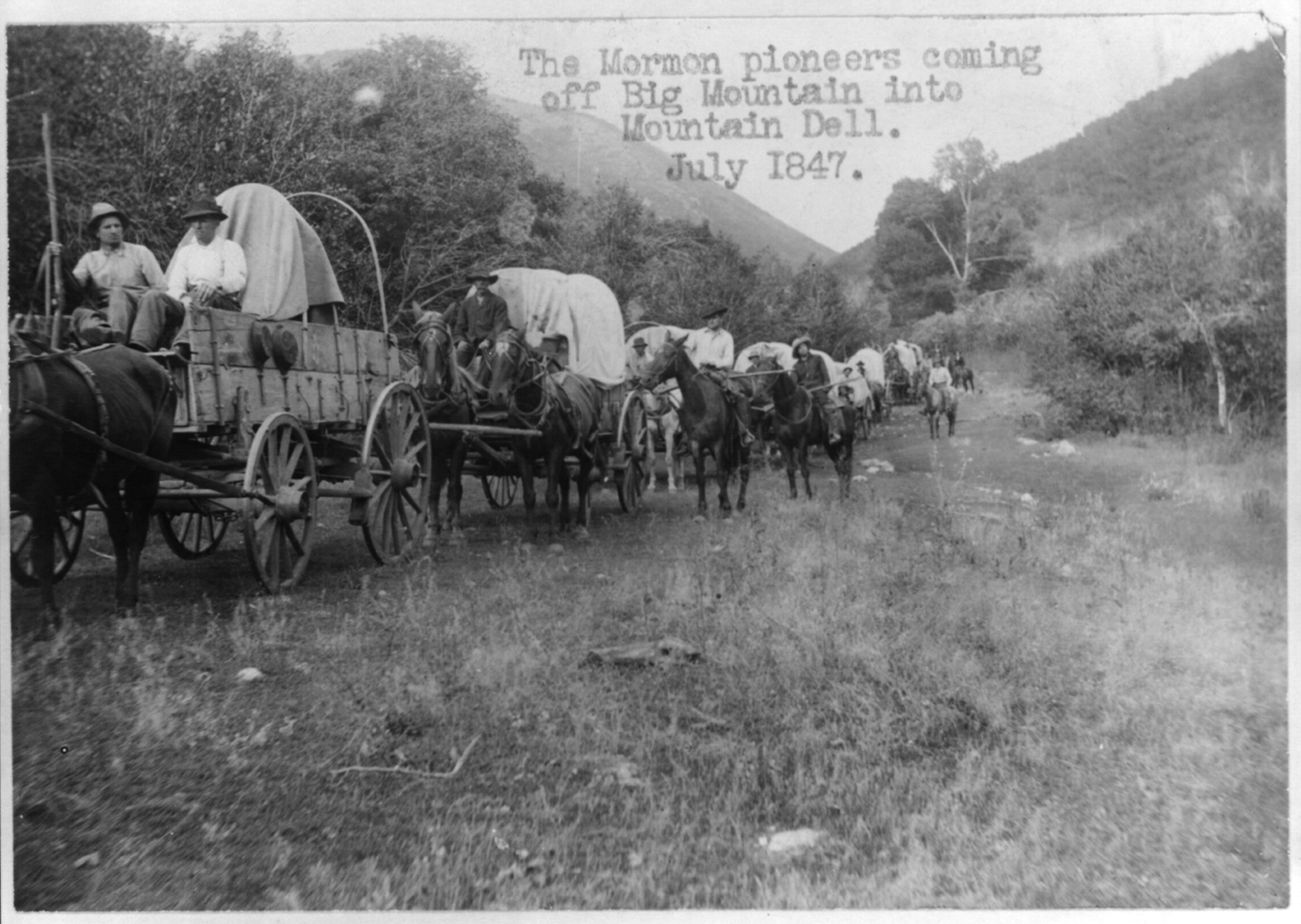
Mormon pioneer wagon train (later re-enactment)

Canada's Mormon Trail has a variety of National Historic Sites, Provincial Historic Sites and many points of interest that display the unique cultural heritage the Mormons have had in the settling of Southern Alberta.

The Mormon Trail begins with the Village Stirling and follows highway 52 and highway 3 to Cardston.

Communities along the trail;

(see also LDS Settlements in Canada)

- Village of Stirling
- Town of Raymond
- Hamlet of Welling
- Town of Magrath
- Hamlet of Spring Coulee
- Hamlet of Woolford
- Town of Cardston
- Hamlet of Leavitt
- Village of Mountain View

Historical Sites and points of interest;

(see also List of attractions and landmarks in Stirling, Alberta)

- Stirling Agricultural Village - National Historic Site
- Galt Historic Railway Park, Stirling
- Michelsen Farmstead, Stirling
- William T. Ogden House
- Raymond Museum
- Raymond Golf club
- Farm Safety Centre, Raymond
- Galt Canal Nature Trail, Magrath - National Historic Site
- Magrath Golf Club
- Card Pioneer Home, Cardston
- Cardston Alberta Temple
- Cardston Lee Creek Valley Golf Course
- Carriage House Theatre, Cardston
- Cobblestone Manor, Cardston
- Courthouse Museum, Cardston
- Remington Carriage Museum, Cardston

Events;

- Stirling Settler Days, Stirling
- Raymond Stampede, Raymond
- Hometown Christmas, Magrath
- I Swam the Dam: Triathlon, Magrath

== See also ==
- Mormon Corridor
- Oregon Trail
- Mormon Trail
- Mormonism
- Pioneer Day in Utah on July 24
- Latter-day Saint settlements in Canada
