= Alberta Highway 5 =

Highway in Alberta

Highway 5
- Highway 5 highlighted in red

Route information
- Maintained by the Ministry of Transportation and Economic Corridors
- Length: 127.2 km (79.0 mi)

Major junctions
- South end: Waterton Park
- Highway 6 in Waterton Lakes National Park; Highway 2 in Cardston; Highway 62 in Magrath; Highway 52 near Welling Station
- North end: Highway 4 in Lethbridge

Location
- Country: Canada
- Province: Alberta
- Specialized and rural municipalities: I.D. No. 4, Cardston County, Warner No. 5 County, Lethbridge County
- Major cities: Lethbridge
- Towns: Magrath, Cardston

Highway system
- Alberta Numbered Highway Network; List; Former
← Highway 4	→ Highway 6

Highway 5 is a 127-kilometre (79 mi) highway that connects Lethbridge to Waterton Lakes National Park in southern Alberta, Canada. It begins as an east–west highway in Waterton and transitions to a north–south route before ending at Highway 4 in Lethbridge.

Highway 5 is part of the Cowboy Trail between Highway 6 in Waterton Lakes National Park and Cardston.

Highway 5 begins in the Hamlet of Waterton Park within Waterton Lakes National Park. After leaving the park, the highway generally travels east, passing by the hamlets of Mountain View and Leavitt, to the Town of Cardston. After Cardston, the highway crosses Blood 148, a reserve of the Blood (Kainai) First Nation, before passing by the Hamlet of Spring Coulee, the Town of Magrath, and the Hamlet of Welling Station. Shortly after Welling Station, the highway travels north, passing the Hamlet of Welling, before entering Lethbridge.

A 75-bed addiction recovery facility for members of the Blood Tribe is under construction along Highway 5 west of Moses Lake, as part of the Alberta Recovery Model.

In Lethbridge, Highway 5 follows Mayor Magrath Drive to the Scenic Drive/24 Avenue South intersection. Historically, Highway 5 continued along Mayor Magrath Drive to Crowsnest Trail (Highway 3); however, it officially turns east and follows 24 Avenue South to 43 Street and terminates at Highway 4. Signage is in place along Highway 3 that directs traffic to Highway 5 via 1st Avenue South and Scenic Drive (from downtown Lethbridge), Mayor Magrath Drive, and 43 Street.

== Major intersections ==
The following is a list of major intersections along Alberta Highway 5 from southwest to northeast.

Rural/specialized municipality	Location	km	mi	Destinations	Notes
I.D. No. 4 (Waterton Lakes National Park)	Waterton Park	0.0	0.0		
I.D. No. 4 (Waterton Lakes National Park)		8.6	5.3	Highway 6 north (Cowboy Trail) – Pincher Creek	West end of Highway 6 concurrency and Cowboy Trail
I.D. No. 4 (Waterton Lakes National Park)		9.5	5.9	Highway 6 south – Chief Mountain, Glacier National Park	East end of Highway 6 concurrency
Cardston County		26.4	16.4	Highway 800 north – Hill Spring	
Cardston County	Mountain View	28.6	17.8		
Cardston County		33.0	20.5	Highway 501 east – Beazer, Police Outpost Provincial Park	Highway 501 is unsigned
Cardston County	Cardston	53.3	33.1	Highway 2 south (Main Street) – Carway Cardston Truck Bypass (Highway 501 south)	West end of Highway 2 concurrency; east end of Cowboy Trail
Blood No. 148		54.0	33.6	Highway 2 north – Fort Macleod	East end of Highway 2 concurrency
Blood No. 148–Cardston County boundary		57.1	35.5	Crosses the St. Mary River	
Cardston County		58.1	36.1	Highway 503 east	
Cardston County		74.3	46.2	Highway 820 south	
Cardston County	Spring Coulee	76.8	47.7	Highway 505 west	
Cardston County	Magrath	94.8	58.9	Highway 62 south – Del Bonita	
Cardston County	Welling	102.6	63.8	Highway 52 east – Raymond, Milk River, Coutts	
Lethbridge County		118.9	73.9	Highway 508 east	
Lethbridge County		121.8	75.7	Lethbridge Airport	
City of Lethbridge		125.8	78.2	Scenic Drive / 24 Avenue S Mayor Magrath Drive	Highway 5 officially follows 24 Avenue S; Highway 5 formerly followed Mayor Magrath Drive
City of Lethbridge		127.2	79.0	43 Street (Highway 4) to Highway 3 / I-15 – Coutts, Great Falls	Northern terminus
1.000 mi = 1.609 km; 1.000 km = 0.621 mi: Concurrency terminus

== See also ==
- Waterton Lakes National Park
