= Charles Ora Card =

Canadian Mormon leader

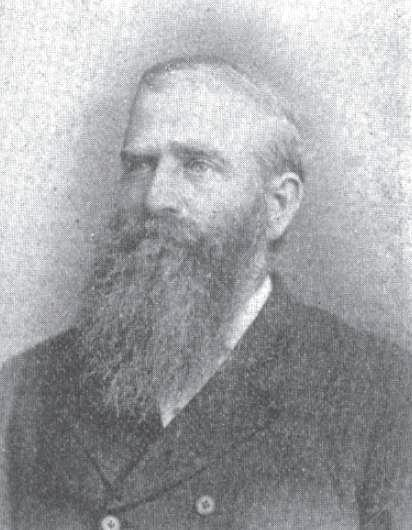
- Charles Ora Card (c. 1901)
- Born: November 5, 1839; Ossian, New York, U.S.
- Died: September 9, 1906 (aged 66); Logan, Utah, U.S.
- Spouses: Sarah Jane Birdneau (m. 1867; div. 1884); Sarah Jane Painter (m. 1876); Zina Presendia Young Williams (m. 1884); Lavinia Clark Rigby (m. 1885)
- Children: 16; Zina Young Card Brown
- Parents: Cyrus Williams Card; Sarah Ann Tuttle

Charles Ora Card (November 5, 1839 – September 9, 1906) was the American founder of Cardston, Alberta, the first Mormon settlement in Canada. He has been referred to as "Canada's Brigham Young". Card was a Mormon pioneer as a teenager, traveling from the eastern United States to Utah Territory in the 1850s. After arriving in Utah, he supervised the construction of the Logan Utah Temple, served as a city councilman, and was appointed to the first board of trustees of Brigham Young College. Card was then tasked by leaders in the Church of Jesus Christ of Latter-day Saints (LDS Church) to travel north to Canada and establish a Latter-day Saint colony there. He worked to make the community self-sufficient, participating in irrigation projects. Card was a practitioner of plural marriage, marrying a total of four wives and having sixteen children. He served in leadership positions within the LDS Church, mainly as stake president. He was the spiritual and economic leader of Cardston.

== Early life ==
Card was born in Ossian, New York, to Cyrus Williams Card and Sarah Ann Tuttle. In 1846, the family moved to St. Joseph County, Michigan, and later returned to New York. Card and his parents joined the LDS Church in 1856, and that same year the family set out to join the body of Latter-day Saints in Utah Territory. Together they crossed the plains in one of the Mormon pioneer handcart companies. Sixteen-year-old Card assisted by standing guard, hunting buffalo, and carrying women and children across rivers. Once they arrived, the Card family settled first in Farmington, Utah, and later moved to Logan in 1860. There, Card built a log cabin for his family. He joined the local group of minutemen and fought in disputes with Native Americans in 1852 and 1860. He attended school in Ogden. He also worked at his father's sawmill and small farm. He later owned both.

== Career ==
He worked as a teacher at the Sabbath Schools in Cache Valley, and later became the superintendent over schools in Logan. Card then became the superintendent of construction on the Logan Tabernacle and the Logan Temple. In this capacity, he supervised the work and encouraged the men to spend their free time studying scriptures. Card was a coroner, road commissioner, and justice of the peace in Cache Valley. He also served as a city councilman for sixteen years, beginning in 1866; his work for education and infrastructure made him a "pillar of the community." Such infrastructure included irrigation for multiple Utah towns, on which he worked for fifteen years as "irrigation canal company director." He was in charge of five mills during the same time period. His involvement in education continued as a member of the first board of trustees of Brigham Young College.

== Church service ==
Card was called to the 56th quorum of Seventy shortly after arriving in Utah. He served the church as a missionary in Michigan, Wisconsin, Iowa, New York, and Massachusetts in 1871. He was then president of the Cache Valley Stake from 1884 to 1890. As stake president, he oversaw meetings for 30 church units (wards and branches) 4 times a year. During this time, the LDS Church was experiencing strained relations with the federal United States government over the church practice of plural marriage. Card requested to be sent to Mexico but was instead assigned to settle in Canada. Church president John Taylor instructed him to find "asylum and justice" in the north. Card took his wife, Zina Williams Card, and left for the North-West Territories of Canada in 1886, successfully escaping arrest. Travelling with twelve other families from Cache Valley, he founded Cardston, North-West Territories, Canada (in present-day Alberta), on June 3, 1887, at what was then called Lee's Creek encampment. Once the Alberta Stake was established, he became its first president. He served as a stake president for more than 20 years.

== Canada ==
The settlers created a town with a grid system and began irrigation projects. Mormon immigrants were praised by a Canadian government inspector for their irrigation efforts, but polygamy was outlawed in Canada soon after the settlement was created. In 1888, a request from John Taylor, Francis Lyman, and Charles Card to practice polygamy was denied by Canadian Prime Minister John A. Macdonald. Regardless, the population of Mormon immigrants in Cardston and its surrounding areas continued to flourish. In 1889, Card returned to Utah to give an account of Cardston's progress to church leaders. Church president Wilford Woodruff instructed him to return to Canada and expand the settlement, with a goal to make Cardston "permanent and self-sustaining." He subsequently purchased the surrounding areas and established settlements at Mountain View, Kimball, Beazer, and Leavitt in present-day Alberta. A railroad connected the colonies to the outside world, and encouraged more immigration; installation of telephones in the 1890s further developed Cardston. When the church's Alberta Stake was created in 1895, the first outside of the United States, Card became its first president. Irrigation projects were successful, and businesses and thousands of Latter-day Saint settlers came to Cardston. Card continued to travel frequently between Alberta and Salt Lake City to give reports and receive direction from church leaders. The church directly participated in the Alberta Railway and Irrigation Company's efforts to irrigate the region. This "first large-scale corporate irrigation project" benefited from the involvement of the Mormon settlers under Card's direction. Card selected two sites for new settlements along the irrigation system: Magrath and Stirling. In 1902, he declared the Canadian colonies self-sufficient.

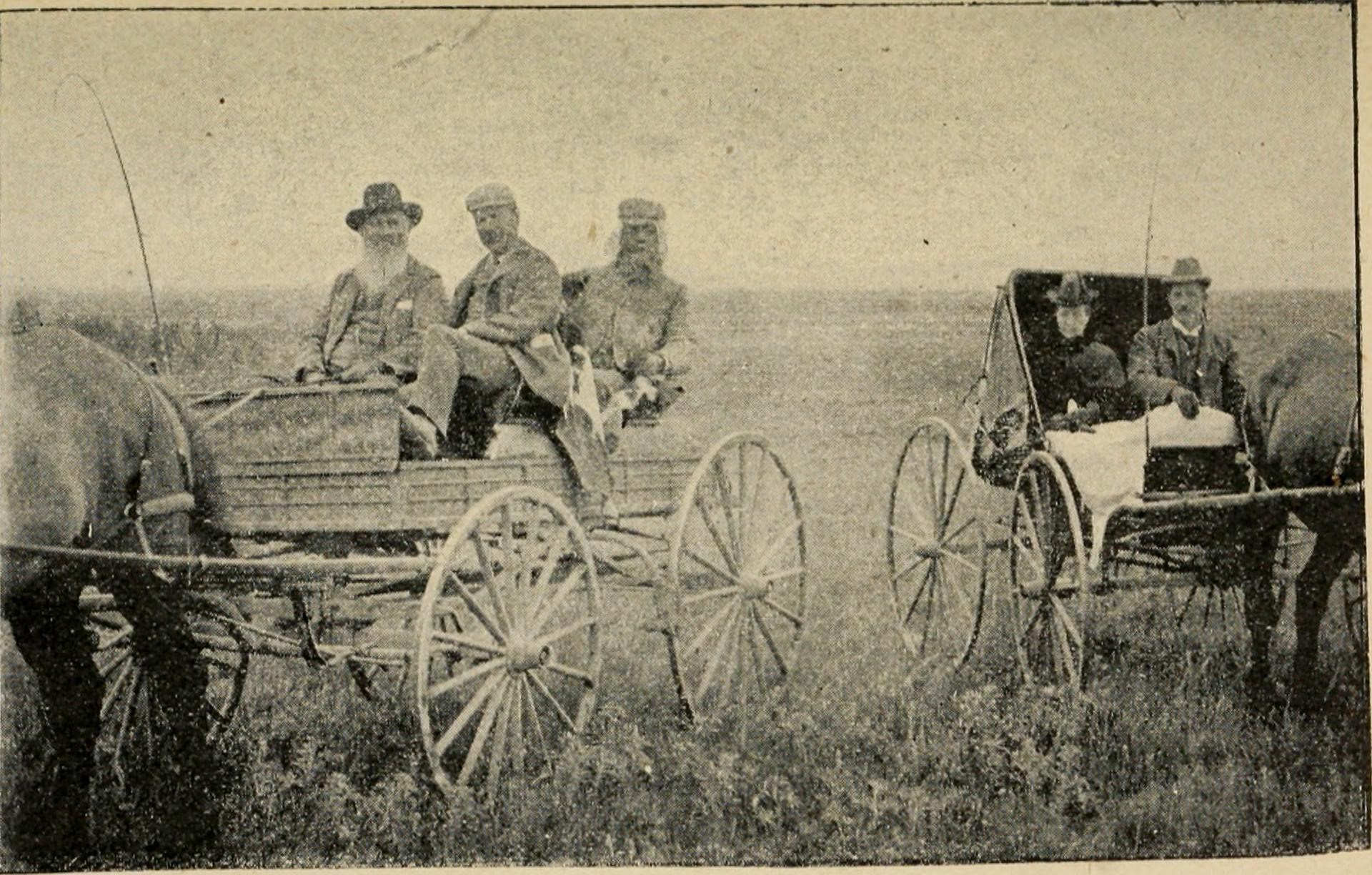
Settlers of Cardston, Alberta, Canada (c. 1900)

== Personal life ==
Card's first wife was Sarah Jane "Sallie" Birdneau, whom he married on October 4, 1867 in Salt Lake City, Utah. Card's memoirs reveal that theirs was a "strained relationship." Birdneau divorced him by March 24, 1884, testifying against Card "on charges of unlawful cohabitation" in court. Card had married a second wife, Sarah Jane Painter, on October 17, 1876. Then, while visiting his children who were attending Brigham Young Academy, he met the school's matron, Brigham Young's widowed daughter, Zina Presendia Williams (née Young). The two were married on June 17, 1884, in Logan, Utah. Card then married Lavinia Clark Rigby on December 2, 1885. Because of his polygamy, the U.S. government sought to arrest him; he often lived in hiding under conditions of poverty and hunger. He wrote letters to his wives using false names. He changed locations every few days, visiting Sarah and Zina in Utah and Lavinia in Idaho as much as he could; he wished to stay with his wives and children for long periods of time, but his situation did not allow this. On July 26, 1886, the federal marshals found and arrested him, but he fled by jumping from the train. He lived again in hiding, often changing locations, until fleeing to Canada. Fearing further persecution, Card took only one of his wives with him to settle Canada. Painter and Rigby selected Zina Williams Card to accompany him. However, he still remained married to all three of them. Whenever he returned to Utah to report on Cardston's progress to church leaders, he visited Painter and Rigby in Logan and Rexburg, Idaho, respectively. Dividing his time between his three families and providing for a growing number of children was challenging. He sought to provide each of them with as much love and financial support as possible. Card's many business ventures in Cardston were not very successful, so he ran a simple store from home. Zina's mother, Zina D. H. Young, visited them often. As a local leader, he enjoyed success. He introduced new farming technology and played a role in the establishing a school and four church meeting houses in Cardston. He also reportedly "reached an understanding" with the neighboring Blood Indian Reserve. He worked as a land agent for the dominion government. He is described as having "astute political sensitivity," and gained the respect of other Canadian leaders after visiting them. He was also devoutly religious, and his beliefs influenced how he led Cardston. His wealth and prominence grew, and he and Zina were visited by businessmen and government officials in their home.

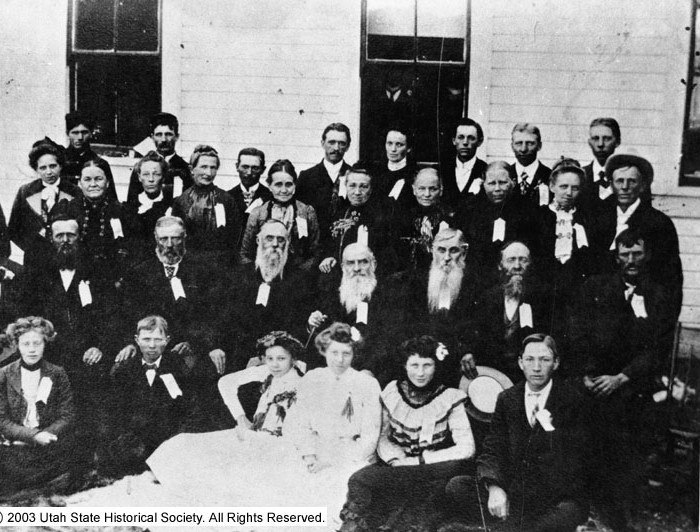
Mormon settlers of Cardston, Alberta, Canada (c. 1902)

When Card's health began to decline in August 1903, he and his family moved back to Logan. His third wife, Lavinia Rigby, lived with him and took care of him during his last days. He died on September 9, 1906.

== Legacy ==
"Under the guidance of Card, irrigation, a village settlement pattern, cooperative economic enterprise, and a web of cultural, social, and religious activities - all elements of a unique way of life - were transferred and adapted from the American Great Basin. A distinctive Mormon country in southern Alberta is the legacy of Charles Ora Card and the early immigrants."

Charles Card played an important role in the settlement of southern Alberta. His economic and spiritual leadership inspired Mormon immigration to Canada. His served as middle man between the LDS Church and the Alberta Irrigation Company, and was in charge of recruiting people to work on the canal project. Within two years, 115 miles were finished. The Mormon settlers were referred to as "the most successful colonizing instruments on the continent." Lee writes that, along with the Canadian government itself, "the Mormons were an indispensable element in the Canadian irrigation story."

His original residence in Cardston, built in 1887, has been restored and now serves as a museum. It is one of the oldest structures of its kind in Alberta today.

Ten thousand Mormon settlers lived in southern Alberta in 1911. By 1923, "80 percent of the Latter-day Saint population in Canada lived within a 100-mile radius of Cardston," the city founded by and named after Charles O. Card. That same year, the Cardston Alberta LDS Temple was finished, making it the first temple built outside the United States. According to the LDS Church's website, 82,088 members of the Church live in Alberta today.

He is the great-grandfather of author Orson Scott Card, author of Ender's Game.

== See also ==
- Edward J. Wood (successor to Card as stake president in Alberta)
