= Taylorville, Alberta =

- Unincorporated community
- Location of Taylorville in Alberta
- Coordinates: 49°02′08″N 113°07′18″W
- Country: Canada
- Province: Alberta
- Region: Southern Alberta
- Census division: 3
- Municipal district: Cardston County
- Founded: 1900

Government
  - Governing body: Cardston County Council
  - MP: Jim Hillyer
  - MLA: Gary Bikman
- Time zone: UTC-7 (MST)
- Postal code span
- Area code: +1-403
- Highways: Highway 501
- Waterways: St. Mary River

Taylorville is an abandoned unincorporated area in Cardston County, Alberta, Canada. It is located on Highway 501 ten miles southeast of Cardston.

== Toponymy ==
Taylorville was named by early settler James H. Taylor, who established a post office for the settlement in 1900 under that name.

== History ==
=== Founding and expansion: 1898-1921 ===
In 1898, the Vaughn family of LDS practitioners traveled from Utah to cross the Canada–United States border into Alberta through Montana. Upon discovering a creek three kilometres north of the border, they decided to homestead there and gave the name 'Vaughn Meadows' to the area designated as suitable for farming.

Unusually for the Canadian Prairies, the Vaughns and other LDS settlers decided not to live on their homesteads in Vaughn Meadows, but instead commute to them from a nearby settlement that became known as Taylorville. A 1900 census report by the North-West Mounted Police (NWMP) places Taylorville near the localities of Aetna and Caldwell (today part of Cardston County).

By 1900, Mormon settlers had constructed residential properties, a general store, and a school in the location close to their farmlands. LDS Church records provide that the community was established as a ward, or congregation, the same year. Early settlers of the commuter town included the Taylor family, which consisted of three brothers. James, who established the town's post office in June 1900, named the commuter town for his family.

By 1908, the NWMP described Taylorville as home to a blacksmith, general store, meeting house, boarding house, and "half a dozen" residential properties. In Taylorville's early years, the locality's post office provided postal services for other nearby hamlets including Del Bonita. Alberta Government Telephones (AGT) established a telephone service to Taylorville in 1915. The schoolhouse doubled as the settlement's place of worship until 1918, when a chapel was built a mile to the east of the settlement.

=== Decline and abandonment: 1922-1963 ===
After a period of early expansion, Taylorville's population growth began to stagnate, as commuting homesteaders decided to live permanently on their farms instead. AGT shut its Taylorville office in 1922, and commercial operations in Taylorville had shut down by 1939, with only farmland remaining.

Social activities outlived commercial ones in Taylorville. In 1925, residents formed a baseball team to compete in a local league. This team was active until 1952, when population decline meant the locality was unable to produce enough interested players. Taylorville's school remained operational until 1963. The post office, which had operated since 1939 from the farm house of postmaster Mrs. Fawn Campbell, also shut down that year. It closed due to a decline in necessity for mail services to the area.

Taylorville continued to serve as the base of LDS Church administrators in the area until 1964, when the Taylorville Ward was absorbed by the Aetna Ward. The local chapel subsequently ceased operations, and the original Taylorville settlement was entirely abandoned by 1976. Although some farms are active in the vicinity as of 2025, only ruins remain of the original settlement.

== Cemetery ==
Taylorville Cemetery, established in 1902, remains open and maintained by Cardston County as of January 2026.

== See also ==
- List of provincial historic sites of Alberta
- List of communities in Alberta
