= Kimball, Alberta =

Kimball
- Hamlet
- Location within Alberta
- Coordinates: 49°04′31″N 113°12′13″W
- Country: Canada
- Province: Alberta
- Region: Southern Alberta
- Census division: 3
- Municipal district: Cardston County
- Founded: 1900

Government
  - Governing body: Cardston County Council
  - MP: Jim Hillyer
  - MLA: Gary Bikman

Population (2008)
  - Total: 26
- Time zone: UTC−06:00 (Alberta Time)
- Postal code span
- Area code: +1-403
- Highways: Highway 501

Kimball is a hamlet in southern Alberta, Canada, within Cardston County. It is located on Highway 501, approximately 7 kilometres (4.3 mi) north of Taylorville, 7 kilometres (4.3 mi) southeast of Aetna, and 16 kilometres (9.9 mi) southeast of Cardston.

== Toponymy ==
Kimball was named for Herber C. Kimball, whose descendants established a ward of the Church of Jesus Christ of Latter-day Saints (LDS Church) in the area.

== Topography ==
Soil in Kimball is predominantly chernozemic.

=== Ecology ===
Grizzly bears have been observed in the vicinity.

== History ==
=== Pre-settlement ===
Archaeologists have unearthed tipi rings, likely installed by Blackfoot peoples, in Kimball. The rings date from the early 18th century or earlier.

=== Settlement and founding: 1890–1902 ===
Kimball was first settled by Henry Cope Colles and his family, who established a trading post on the Canada-United States border. They opened a post office named Colles in September 1893, and established Colles School in 1897.

1897 also saw immigrants from Salt Lake City settle an area two miles north of Colles. They opened Kimball Cemetery around 1898, and founded the Kimball Ward of the LDS Church in 1900. The ward had 230 members at the time of its establishment.

In February 1902, the Colles post office changed names to Kimball, and Colles School was moved to the new townsite to serve its considerably larger population. A general store also opened that year.

=== Development and decline: 1903–1960 ===
In 1904, the Canadian Pacific Railway laid the foundation for a rail connection to Kimball from Woolford. Kimball's population grew in anticipation of the railway link, and commercial operations including a blacksmith opened in the area, but no track was ever built.

The community's expansion nonetheless necessitated the construction of a larger school building in 1905, and its population reached its peak in 1911, surpassing 230 residents. The locality received rural telephone services in 1912. Kimball School burned down in December 1913 after the gas stove exploded; it was rebuilt the following year.

As it became apparent that the area would not receive a railway connection, and Alberta's highways became more sophisticated, Kimball began to depopulate. The nearby St. Mary River was also prone to flooding, which killed at least three residents in the early 1920s alone. Kimball School closed permanently in the early 1940s, and the LDS Kimball Ward shut in 1948, transferring its responsibilities to Aetna. Kimball was recognized as a hamlet by the Government of Alberta in 1954, two years before its post office closed.

=== Recent developments: 1961–present ===
In the mid-1960s, resident Jack Dunn bequeathed five acres of land to Cardston County for the purposes of becoming a recreational area. Kimball Park opened in 1974. A local history considered the original Kimball townsite to have "faded" away by 1978.

As of 2025, Kimball contains a small farming community.

== Places of interest ==
As of 2026, Kimball Cemetery remains operational and accessible to the public, as is Kimball Park.

== Demographics ==
The population of Kimball according to the 2008 municipal census conducted by Cardston County is 26.

== Notable residents ==
- Douglas "Doug" F. Peterson (1921–2001) – veteran who fought for Canada in World War II and was honoured for gallantry for his service in the First Special Service Force; raised in Kimball.

== See also ==
- List of communities in Alberta
- List of hamlets in Alberta
- List of provincial historic sites of Alberta
