= Whiskey Gap =

- Unincorporated community
- Location of Whiskey Gap in Alberta
- Coordinates: 49°01′57″N 113°01′53″W
- Country: Canada
- Province: Alberta
- Region: Southern Alberta
- Census division: 3
- Municipal district: Cardston County

Government
  - Governing body: Cardston County Council
- Time zone: UTC−06:00 (Alberta Time)
- Postal code span: T0K 2P0
- Area code: +1-403
- Highways: Highway 501
- Waterways: Milk River

Whiskey Gap, originally known as "Fareham", is a ghost town in Cardston County, Alberta, Canada. The former community is approximately 80 km (50 mi) south of the city of Lethbridge, 31.2 km (19.4 mi) southeast of the town of Cardston, 18.2 km (11.3 mi) west of Del Bonita on Highway 501, and roughly 4 kilometres (2.5 mi) north of the Canada–United States border.

== History ==
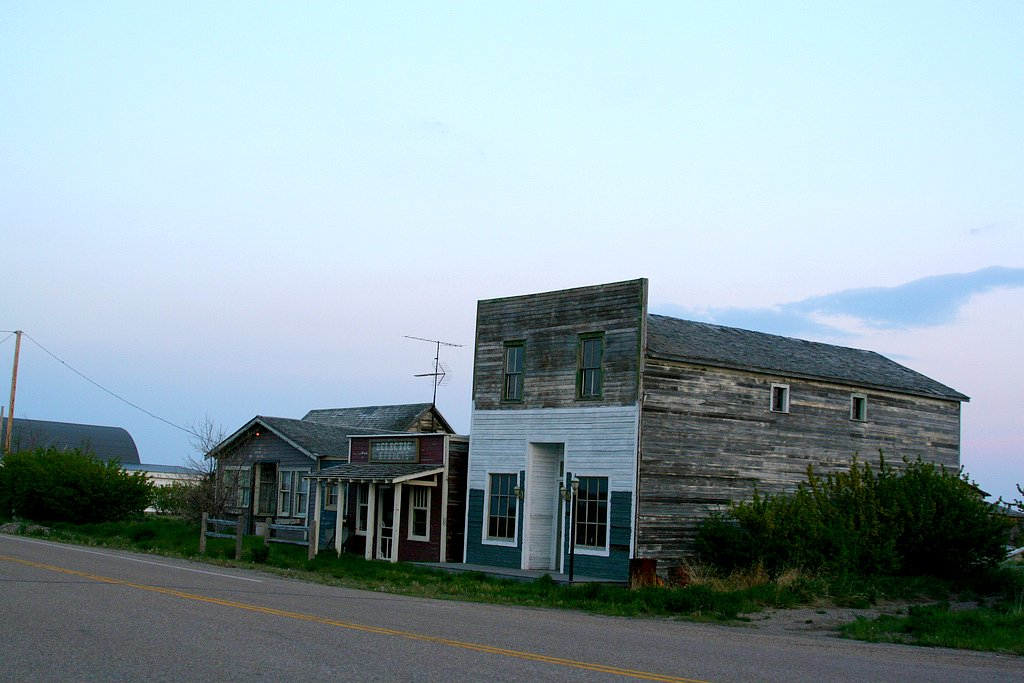
Whiskey Gap storefronts now located in the community of Del Bonita, Alberta. Formally known as The Little Ghost Town on the Prairie Ltd. the buildings were used as antique store, bed and breakfast, café and ice-cream parlour for visitors crossing the Del Bonita Border Crossing.

In the 1860s and 1870s American traders crossed into what would eventually become Alberta to trade goods and alcohol for buffalo robes and furs. One of the main routes for this trade, the Riplinger Road, crossed the border just west of Whiskey Gap. Many of the wagon cart trails from the early settlers from this era can still be seen over a hundred years later throughout the valley.

During the Canadian prohibition period in Alberta between 1916 and 1924 alcohol was smuggled through this area from the United States into Canada. Later alcohol was smuggled in the opposite direction when the American prohibition was declared between 1920 and 1933.

The local post office was named Fareham in 1918. When the Canadian Pacific Railway reached the area, the community boomed. Consisting of three grain elevators, a store, and other businesses and houses grew up around the railway. In 1929 with some hesitation from local LDS families, the community was officially renamed Whiskey Gap. Although little remains of this once thriving community, its name reflects its long and colourful past and strategic location. Only a historic plaque with various foundations spread throughout the site are visible through the overgrown prairie grass along the abandoned railway next to highway 501.

A small church building was moved from the community of Jefferson sometime in the 1980-1990s to be used as a private dwelling. It now remains the only structure in Whiskey Gap. Many of Whiskey Gap's commercial buildings have since been moved to the nearby community of Del Bonita, Alberta. These buildings were used as a tourist attraction and bed and breakfast called the Little Ghost Town on the Prairie Ltd., now closed.

== Geography ==
The town site is in a pass through the Milk River range of hills on a watershed between the Missouri and Saskatchewan River drainage system, which suggests the name "gap" at first glance.

== Media ==
In 1961 Colin Low of the National Film Board of Canada created Days of Whiskey Gap, a short film depicting tales of the North-West Mounted Police efforts to enforce "the Queen's law", ensuring Western Canada did not become a lawless frontier like the early "Wild West" of the American frontier.

In 1976 Whiskey Gap hosted the production of Terrence Malick's period film Days of Heaven. Covered wagons, coaches, old-fashioned trucks, and hundreds of people dressed in period clothing bustled about the area during filming.

== See also ==
- List of ghost towns in Alberta
- Prohibition in Canada
- Prohibition
- Rum-running
- Fort Whoop-up
