= Jefferson, Alberta =

Jefferson
- Unincorporated community
- The Jefferson School classes in the 1940s. This building was condemned and deliberately burned to the ground in April 2007.

- Location within Alberta
- Coordinates: 49°05′07″N 113°05′28″W
- Country: Canada
- Province: Alberta
- Region: Southern Alberta
- Census division: 3
- Municipal district: Cardston County
- Founded: 1899

Government
  - Governing body: Cardston County
  - MP: Jim Hillyer
  - MLA: Gary Bikman

Area
  - Total: .9 km^{2} (0.35 sq mi)
- Elevation: 975 m (3,199 ft)

Population (2006)
  - Total: few
- Time zone: UTC-7 (MST)
- Postal code span: T0K 0K0
- Area code: +1-403

Jefferson (also known as Owendale) is an unincorporated community within Cardston County, Alberta, Canada. It community is located approximately 16 km (9.9 mi) southeast of Cardston, which is home to Cardston County's municipal office.

== Government ==
The community itself has no government such as a mayor or councillors. It is administered by the Cardston County.

== History ==
One of Jefferson's two services at this point in time is an unstaffed postal box outlet (Rural Route 2 Site 10). It shares the same postal code as Cardston (T0K 0K0), and in fact, mail going to the Jefferson area is addressed to Cardston - as Jefferson-bound mail is sorted at Cardston - then delivered to Jefferson by Canada Post on Monday, Wednesday, and Friday. There is a new Canada Post box installment after the old, green one was covered by debris when the neighboring abandoned Jefferson Garage collapsed in a windstorm in 2003.

The garage had been abandoned for generations and the wooden structure had seemed to be on the verge of collapse for years. The now-flattened garage had been beside an old General Store, but that store was converted into a family home generations ago.

The other service for the community is the Jefferson Waste Transfer Site, constructed in the 1980s to replace an old open-air dump that was located in a small gully two miles west of Jefferson. The newer Waste Transfer Site is located only about a quarter-mile east of Jefferson, and is staffed only one day a week.

The newer waste site is much stricter than the old one, where anything up to old cars were left behind. The new site requires certain treatment of the waste before dumping it in the building, where it is later pushed off into a dump truck waiting in a passageway below. Many items are not allowed to be dumped at all anymore.

This modernization of waste treatment in rural communities seems to have occurred in many regions of Alberta, as identical facilities can be seen elsewhere.

There was a community hall (which used to be the Jefferson School in the mid 1900s), but it fell into disuse and disrepair in the 1990s. The main problem was roof leaks that ruined the hardwood gym floor. Prior to this, it had been used for community dances and 4-H functions such as public speaking competitions. By 2007, it was broken into and vandalized by unknown culprits and internal destruction was of such a scale that it was condemned. After being scheduled to be demolished, it was burned to the ground on April 24, 2007.

The Jefferson 4-H Beef Club seems to have disappeared, also during the 1990s, and been absorbed by the Chinook 4-H Club in Cardston. This is probably due to many of the 4-H aged youth growing up and moving on, with not enough younger club members to replace them.

Jefferson used to have its own Alberta Wheat Pool elevator and had a railroad going through it. However, as a result of Alberta removing its lesser-used rail lines, the railway going through Jefferson (from east of Cardston south to Jefferson, then east to Whiskey Gap, Alberta) was torn up in the early 1980s. The grain elevator was torn down when the province began consolidating its grain processing in larger centers.

== See also ==
- List of communities in Alberta
