= Woolford, Alberta =

Woolford
- Hamlet
- Location of Woolford in Alberta
- Coordinates: 49°11′06″N 113°09′55″W
- Country: Canada
- Province: Alberta
- Region: Southern Alberta
- Census division: 3
- Municipal district: Cardston County
- Founded: 1900

Government
  - Governing body: Cardston County Council
  - MP: Jim Hillyer
  - MLA: Gary Bikman

Population (1986)
  - Total: 13
- Time zone: UTC−06:00 (Alberta Time)
- Postal code span
- Area code: +1-403
- Highways: Highway 503

Woolford is a hamlet in southern Alberta, Canada, within Cardston County. It is located on Highway 503, approximately 16 kilometres (9.9 mi) southeast of Cardston between the St. Mary River and the Milk River Ridge.

== Toponymy ==
Woolford is named for Thomas Woolford (1856–1944), a successful farmer and community leader who lived in the area between 1899 and 1911.

== History ==
=== Pre-Woolford ===
The first known resident to settle permanently in the area was Bill Aldridge, who built a cabin near the site in 1890. Aldridge vacated the area after losing his property in a prairie fire.

=== Founding and development: 1900–1929 ===
In 1899, American farmer and Church of Jesus Christ of Latter-day Saints (LDS) practitioner Thomas Henry Woolford moved to the area. He became the founder of the village that today bears his name. A community of LDS parishioners soon assembled in the area, and Woolford became a branch of the church (Woolford Ward) in 1906. A schoolhouse opened that year, which doubled as a community hall.

In 1910, the Canadian Pacific Railway (CPR) built a subdivision connecting Raley to Whiskey Gap, and established a station named Woolford one mile northeast of the existing community. For the next two decades, Woolford would benefit from being the southernmost point on the railway; it developed as a trading hub as a result. The original Woolford location became known colloquially as Woolford Flat, consisting of the schoolhouse, several houses, and the LDS church.

The Woolford CPR station was soon surrounded by three grain elevators, several stores, and a Chinese restaurant. A Woolford post office (known as Woolford Station for its first seven years of operations) opened in 1912, and Woolford Cemetery was established two years later. A Hutterite colony, Big Bend Hutterite Colony, was founded near Woolford in 1920, and a Presbyterian congregation opened Woolford United Church in 1926.

The railway line through Woolford was extended to the border with Montana in 1929. This diluted Woolford's necessity as a commercial hub, and ended the hamlet's rapid early growth.

=== Rest of the 20th century: 1930–2000 ===
One of Woolford's grain elevators burned down in 1930. In the following years, Woolford also lost at least four businesses to fires, and a second grain elevator. Woolford School closed in 1947, and students were transferred to schools in Cardston.

Woolford's name was accepted for federal mapping purposes in July 1954. Its post office closed permanently in May 1958, and its United Church closed in 1967. According to analysis of the Cardston region by Agriculture and Agri-Food Canada, the number of active farms in Woolford depleted from 44 in 1963 to 27 in 1970. The LDS' Woolford Ward folded in 1971.

A 1977 report issued by a federal Grain Handling and Transportation Commission, chaired by Emmett Matthew Hall, recommended that the CPR's Woolford Subdivision line should be abandoned by the end of the year. At this time, the Alberta Wheat Pool owned the two active grain elevators remaining in Woolford; the company indicated that it had no plans to upgrade them.

=== 21st century: 2001–present ===
Raimount Energy discovered oil near Woolford in 2010, and sold 50% of its interest in the site to Shell plc the following year.

As of 2025, the original Woolford site contains some properties and farmland. Woolford Cemetery has continued to receive interments into the 21st century.

== Demographics ==
Woolford recorded a population of 13 in the 1986 Census of Population conducted by Statistics Canada.

== Attractions ==
The Woolford Provincial Park is a provincial park west of Highway 503, approximately 18 km (11 mi) east of Cardston.

== Notable residents ==
- John Horne Blackmore – teacher and later politician who taught in Woolford in the 1910s.

== See also ==
- List of communities in Alberta
- List of hamlets in Alberta
- List of provincial historic sites of Alberta
