= Raley, Alberta =

Settlement in Alberta, Canada (est. 1909)

Raley
- Unincorporated community
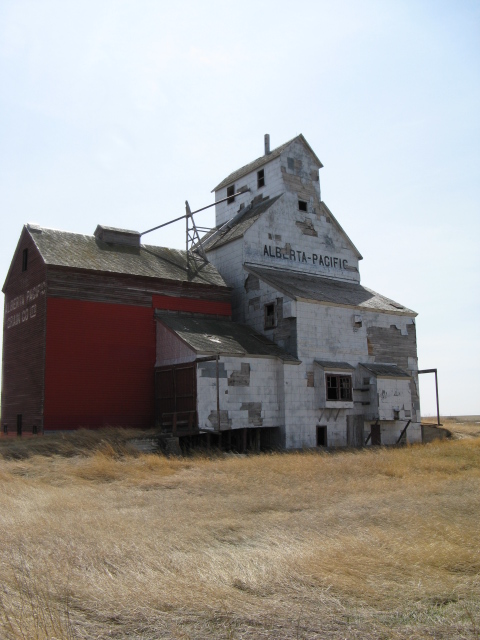
- Oldest grain elevator in Alberta.

- Location of Raley in Alberta
- Coordinates: 49°17′25″N 113°10′59″W
- Country: Canada
- Province: Alberta
- Region: Southern Alberta
- Census division: 2
- Municipal district: Cardston County
- Founded: 1909

Government
  - Governing body: Cardston County Council
  - MP: Jim Hillyer
  - MLA: Gary Bikman
- Time zone: UTC-7 (MST)
- Postal code span: TOK 2EO
- Area code: +1-403
- Highways: Highway 5
- Waterways: Old Man Reservoir

Raley, Alberta is an unincorporated community in Cardston County, Alberta, Canada. The population of Raley was 5 in 1966. The community is located about 4 km north of Highway 5 and about 15 km east of the Town of Cardston. Raley is named after C. Raley, of Lethbridge.

== Alberta Pacific Elevator Co. Ltd. elevator ==
The Alberta Pacific Elevator at Raley was built as a 35,000 bushel elevator and is likely the oldest standing elevator in Alberta constructed shortly after the St. Mary Railway line (succeeded by Canadian Pacific Railway) was constructed in 1900 from Stirling to Cardston and finished in 1902. The post office opened in 1910. The elevator was built in 1905 by the Alberta Pacific Elevator Co. Ltd. A permanent cribbed annex was added to the elevator in 1940. In 1967 the elevator became part of the Federal Line of elevators. Then in 1972 the elevator was taken over by the Alberta Wheat Pool but was closed very shortly afterwards and taken over by the Hutterite colony at Raley. This elevator has high architectural significance as it is an excellent and the only unaltered example of an Alberta Pacific Elevator Co. 35,000 bushel capacity elevator.

The Alberta Pacific elevator at Raley was the first of a number of elevators operating by 1911. It is the only one that has survived, probably because it is now in private hands. By 1911 there were two other elevators at Raley, one was a 30,000 bushel elevator built by A.G. Robertson and the other a 15,000 bushel elevator operated by Sunny Belt Grain Elevator Co. Ltd. This was upgraded to a 30,000 bushel house in 1917.

In 1924 the Raley Hutterite colony took over the A.G. Robertson elevator and in 1940 the Alberta Pacific Grain Co. took over the Sunny belt elevator, by this time owned by the N. Bawlf Grain Co. It was operated in conjunction with the original elevator. Both elevators went to the Alberta Wheat Pool in 1972. There was a fourth elevator at Raley, an Alberta Pool Elevator 40,000 bushel house built in 1929. This elevator disappears from the records by the late 1930s. The Sunny belt and A.g. Robertson elevators were demolished sometime after 1972.

== See also ==
- List of communities in Alberta
