= Leavitt, Alberta =

Leavitt
- Hamlet
- Location of Leavitt Leavitt (Canada)
- Coordinates: 49°10′N 113°27′W
- Country: Canada
- Province: Alberta
- Region: Southern Alberta
- Census division: 3
- Municipal district: Cardston County

Government
  - Type: Unincorporated
  - Governing body: Cardston County Council

Population (2008)
  - Total: 59
- Time zone: UTC−06:00 (Alberta Time)
- Area codes: 403, 587, 825

Leavitt is a hamlet in southern Alberta, Canada within Cardston County, located about 13 kilometres (8 mi) west of Cardston on Highway 5. It falls within the Canadian federal electoral district of Medicine Hat—Cardston—Warner.

== History ==
The first settler of the area was Thomas Rowell Leavitt, a Latter-day Saint from Utah Territory who came to Alberta fleeing a United States government crackdown on polygamy during a wave of late nineteenth century Latter-day Saint emigration to Canada and Mexico. The settlement's first name was Buffalo Flats, but it was subsequently changed to Leavitt in honour of the early Latter-day Saint settler.

Cardston was the first Latter-day Saint settlement in Canada, and Leavitt was founded by a like-minded Latter-day Saint. Thomas Rowell Leavitt was born in Hatley, Quebec, Canada in 1834. Early converts to Mormonism, his parents subsequently moved to Utah. He had 26 children: 12 with his wife Ann Eliza; 9 with wife Antoinette; and 5 with Harriet Martha. Four children died in their infancy, leaving 22 children who grew to adulthood. Twenty of the 22 eventually chose to remain in Canada as citizens, and today there are many Leavitts in the region, descendants of the original pioneer.

Thomas Rowell 'Tom' Leavitt was a farmer who had previously served as constable, marshal and sheriff of Wellsville, Utah. To reach Canada, Leavitt endured a six-week, 1,300-kilometre (800 mi) journey in early spring 1887. He and his party reached their destination at Lee Creek, Alberta, on May 25. They had come in covered wagons—the last recorded pioneer wagon train in the Old West. He had left his first wife Ann Eliza (Jenkins) behind at his Wellsville ranch, and Leavitt was accompanied on his trek by his third wife Harriet Martha (Dowdle), along with several of his children by his three wives.

The first school met in the church building, completed July 10, 1896.

Thomas Leavitt's son Alfred, born in Utah, followed his father to Alberta in 1897. He and his brothers helped dig the irrigation canals that Charles Ora Card, founder of Cardston, had promised the Canadian government in return for more land grants to Latter-day Saint settlers.

Basking in the shadow of Chief Mountain and the Canadian Rockies range, the hamlet of Leavitt is located in a valley of rolling hills only kilometres from the U.S.-Canada border. Cattle ranching and agriculture make up most of the area's economy. The Latter-day Saint legacy still tinctures much of this area of Alberta. Much of the region's population is still heavily Latter-day Saint, which is typified by the large Cardston Alberta Temple in Cardston.

The Hamlet of Leavitt's first post office opened in 1900 with Walter Glenn the first postmaster; the post office closed permanently in 1968. During those 68 years, three Leavitt family members acted as postmaster. The founder of Leavitt, former sheriff Tom Leavitt, died in 1891. The Leavitt Chapel, a meetinghouse for the Cardston Stake, was built in 1896, and remained in use until the 1950s.

Much of the area around Leavitt is sparsely settled.

== Demographics ==
The population of Leavitt according to the 2008 municipal census conducted by Cardston County is 59.

== See also ==
- LDS Settlements in Canada
- List of communities in Alberta
- List of hamlets in Alberta
