= Payne Lake =

Payne Lake may refer to:

- Payne Lake (Alberta)
- Payne Lake (New York)
- Payne Lake (Quebec), the largest of these lakes
