= Frankburg, Alberta =

Abandoned settlement in Alberta, Canada

Frankburg is a former community founded by Latter-day Saint (LDS) settlers, located in Foothills County, Alberta. The community was located 12 km east of High River.

Very little remains of this settlement founded by members of The Church of Jesus Christ of Latter-day Saints other than the Frankburg Cemetery. Christopher Frank, an early postmaster, gave the community his last name.

== See also ==
- List of communities in Alberta
- Frank Lake (Alberta)
