= Waterton Park =

Community in Alberta, Canada

- Hamlet
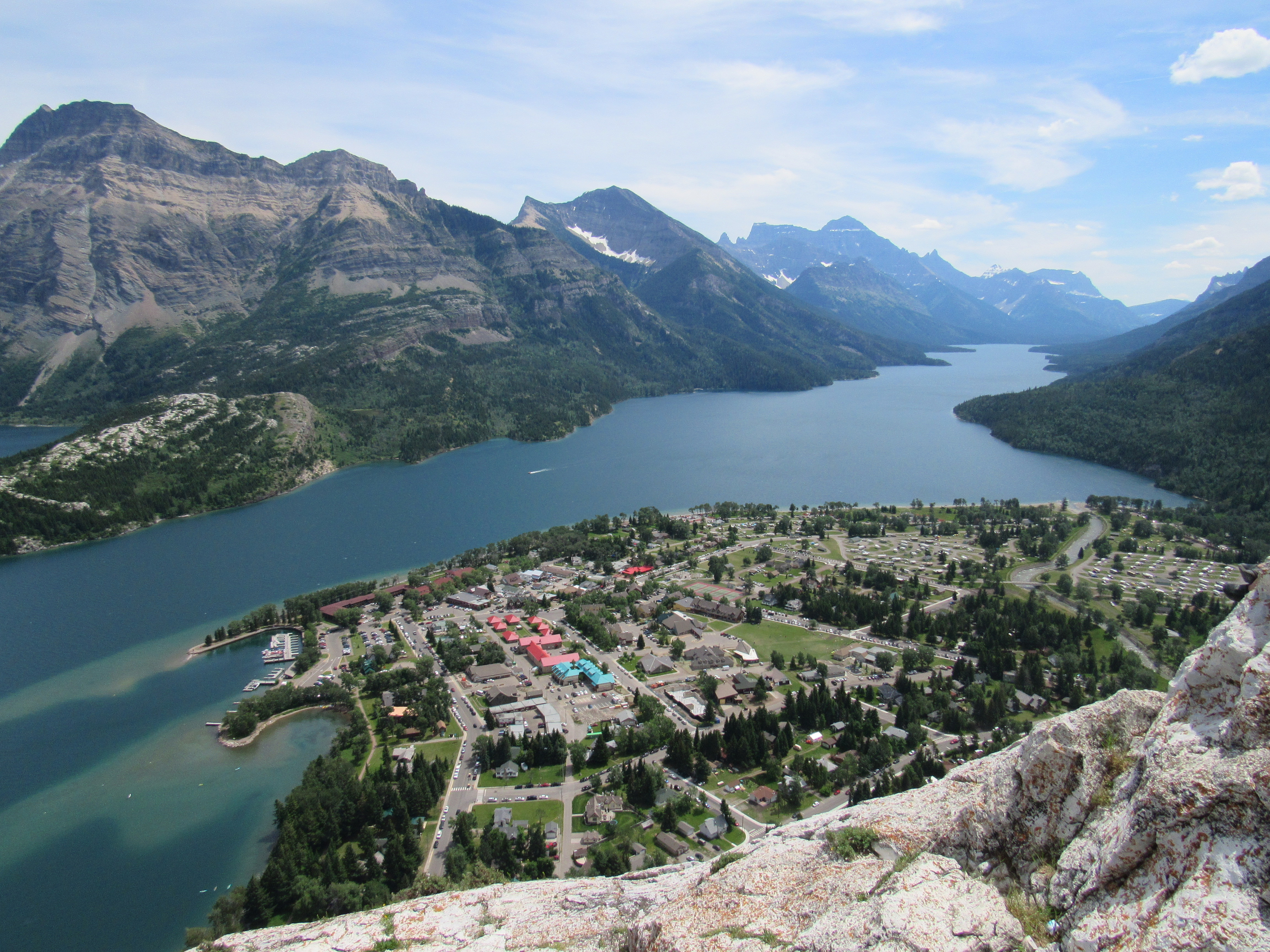
- View from above of Waterton Park

- Location of Waterton Park in Alberta
- Coordinates: 49.0517°N 113.9142°W
- Country: Canada
- Province: Alberta
- Census division: No. 3
- Improvement District: Improvement District No. 4 Waterton

Government
  - Type: Unincorporated
  - Governing body: Alberta Municipal Affairs

Area (2021)
  - Land: 482.54 km^{2} (186.31 sq mi)
- Elevation: 1,280 m (4,200 ft)

Population (2021)
  - Total: 132
- Time zone: UTC−06:00 (Alberta Time)
- Area code: 403 / 587
- highways: Highway 5

Waterton Park, commonly referred to as Waterton, is a hamlet in southwestern Alberta, Canada within Improvement District No. 4 Waterton (Waterton Lakes National Park).

It is located at the southwestern terminus of Highway 5, approximately 54 kilometres (34 mi) west of the Town of Cardston and 55 kilometres (34 mi) south of the Town of Pincher Creek. This hamlet is north of Glacier National Park in Montana. It has an elevation of 1,280 metres (4,200 ft).

The hamlet is located in Census Division No. 3 and in the federal riding of Lethbridge.

== Demographics ==
In the 2021 Census of Population conducted by Statistics Canada, Waterton Park had a population of 132 living in 54 of its 195 total private dwellings, a change of 25.7% from its 2016 population of 105. With a land area of 482.54 km^{2} (186.31 sq mi), it had a population density of 0.3/km^{2} (0.7/sq mi) in 2021.

As a designated place in the 2016 Census of Population conducted by Statistics Canada, Waterton Park had a population of 105 living in 39 of its 168 total private dwellings, a change of 19.3% from its 2011 population of 88. With a land area of 485.66 km^{2} (187.51 sq mi), it had a population density of 0.2/km^{2} (0.6/sq mi) in 2016.

Population history
of Waterton Park

Year	Pop.	±%
1966	216	—
1971	236	+9.3%
1976	142	−39.8%
1981	133	−6.3%
1986	119	−10.5%
1991	135	+13.4%
1991A	167	+23.7%

Year	Pop.	±%
1996	279	+67.1%
2001	155	−44.4%
2006	160	+3.2%
2011	88	−45.0%
2016	105	+19.3%
2021	158	+50.5%
2021C	132	−16.5%

Source: Statistics Canada

== Climate ==
Waterton Park has a humid continental climate (Köppen Dfb), just above the subarctic climate (Dfc). Summers are mild with cool nights, while winters are chilly with highs around freezing. Precipitation is relatively consistent year round, but peaks during the months of May and June.

Climate data for Waterton Park
Month	Jan	Feb	Mar	Apr	May	Jun	Jul	Aug	Sep	Oct	Nov	Dec	Year
Record high °C (°F)	15 (59)	17 (63)	20 (68)	26.5 (79.7)	30 (86)	31 (88)	34.5 (94.1)	34 (93)	32.8 (91.0)	29 (84)	19 (66)	20 (68)	34.5 (94.1)
Mean daily maximum °C (°F)	0.3 (32.5)	1.3 (34.3)	5.3 (41.5)	10 (50)	15 (59)	19 (66)	22.5 (72.5)	22 (72)	17.3 (63.1)	11.8 (53.2)	3.1 (37.6)	−0.3 (31.5)	10.6 (51.1)
Mean daily minimum °C (°F)	−10.6 (12.9)	−9.8 (14.4)	−5.5 (22.1)	−1.5 (29.3)	2.8 (37.0)	6.1 (43.0)	7.9 (46.2)	6.9 (44.4)	3.4 (38.1)	0.6 (33.1)	−5.8 (21.6)	−9.7 (14.5)	−1.3 (29.7)
Record low °C (°F)	−40.5 (−40.9)	−50 (−58)	−34.4 (−29.9)	−24.4 (−11.9)	−11 (12)	−6 (21)	−3 (27)	−5 (23)	−12 (10)	−27 (−17)	−34 (−29)	−44.5 (−48.1)	−50 (−58)
Average precipitation mm (inches)	59.3 (2.33)	46.3 (1.82)	69.3 (2.73)	64.5 (2.54)	94.5 (3.72)	80.8 (3.18)	70.8 (2.79)	69 (2.7)	60.8 (2.39)	65.1 (2.56)	68.7 (2.70)	58.4 (2.30)	807.6 (31.80)
Source: Environment Canada

== See also ==
- List of communities in Alberta
- List of designated places in Alberta
- List of hamlets in Alberta
