= Spring Coulee =

- Hamlet
- Location of Spring Coulee Spring Coulee (Canada)
- Coordinates: 49°20′04″N 113°03′06″W
- Country: Canada
- Province: Alberta
- Region: Southern Alberta
- Census division: 3
- Municipal district: Cardston County

Government
  - Type: Unincorporated
  - Governing body: Cardston County Council

Population (2008)
  - Total: 43
- Time zone: UTC−06:00 (Alberta Time)
- Area codes: 403, 587, 825

Spring Coulee is a hamlet in southern Alberta, Canada within Cardston County, located 2 kilometres (1.2 mi) east of Highway 5, approximately 42 kilometres (26 mi) southwest of Lethbridge.

== History ==
Spring Coulee once boasted a general store, a hotel, three grain elevators, a pool hall, a bank, a United Church, a community hall, a school and a few other businesses. Over time, as the farms around the hamlet became larger and people started moving away, Spring Coulee dwindled somewhat. The general store, hotel, grain elevators, pool hall, bank and community hall have all been torn down. The United Church building was moved to near Glenwood and has been converted into a private home. The old four-room school still stands and has also been converted into a private home. There are several other private dwellings remaining in the hamlet boundaries and in fact there has been some growth of the community in the past 20 years with a few new homes being added.

The two main landmarks of the hamlet today are a seed cleaning plant and the Church of Jesus Christ of Latter-day Saints.

== Demographics ==
The population of Spring Coulee according to the 2008 municipal census conducted by Cardston County is 43.

== Notable people ==
- Hugh B. Brown (1883–1975), cowboy, rancher, farmer, Canadian military officer, lawyer, oil company executive, politician, LDS Church leader

== See also ==
- List of communities in Alberta
- List of hamlets in Alberta
