= Carway, Alberta =

Carway
- Hamlet
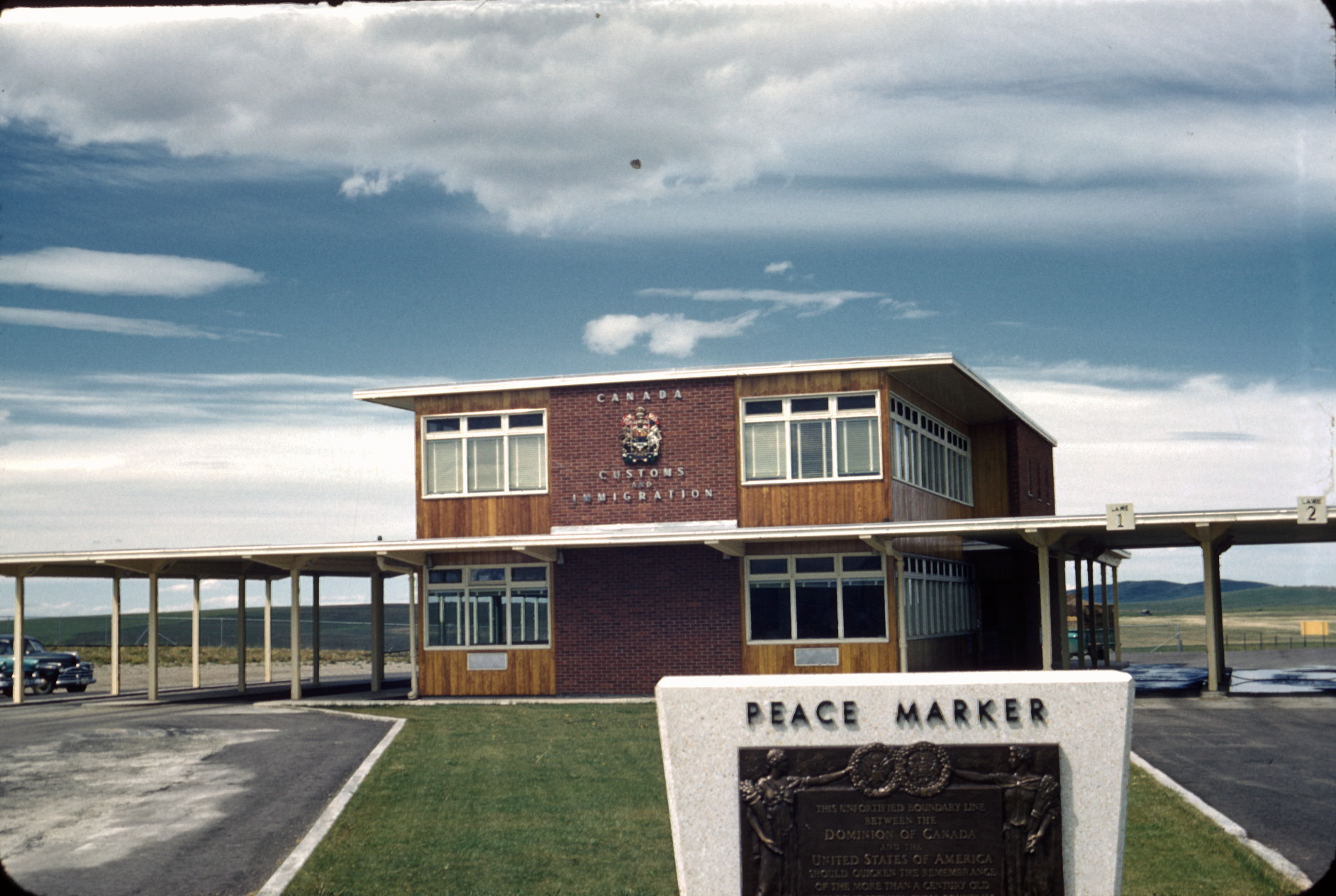
- Border crossing in Carway, Alberta

- Location of Carway Carway (Canada)
- Coordinates: 49°00′00″N 113°22′45″W
- Country: Canada
- Province: Alberta
- Region: Southern Alberta
- Census division: 3
- Municipal district: Cardston County

Government
  - Type: Unincorporated
  - Governing body: Cardston County Council

Population (2008)
  - Total: 2
- Time zone: UTC−06:00 (Alberta Time)
- Area codes: 403, 587, 825

Carway is a hamlet in southern Alberta, Canada within Cardston County. It is a port of entry into the U.S. state of Montana opposite of Port of Piegan. Just on the other side of the border is the Blackfeet Indian Reservation in Glacier County, Montana.

Located approximately 23 km (14 mi) south of Cardston. Carway is on the southernmost point of Highway 2, which becomes U.S. Route 89 in Montana.

The hamlet was named by William Roberts, the first officer in charge of the station, as a portmanteau of Cardston and highway.

== Climate ==
Carway has a humid continental climate (Dfb) with mild, rainy summers and cold, snowy winters with annual snowfall averaging 250.4 cm (98.6 in).

Climate data for Carway, Alberta (1991–2020 normals, extremes 1914–present)
| Month | Jan | Feb | Mar | Apr | May | Jun | Jul | Aug | Sep | Oct | Nov | Dec | Year |
|---|---|---|---|---|---|---|---|---|---|---|---|---|---|
| Record high °C (°F) | 16.7 (62.1) | 19.0 (66.2) | 24.4 (75.9) | 29.4 (84.9) | 30.0 (86.0) | 32.8 (91.0) | 38.0 (100.4) | 36.3 (97.3) | 35.0 (95.0) | 30.0 (86.0) | 24.4 (75.9) | 21.0 (69.8) | 38.0 (100.4) |
| Mean daily maximum °C (°F) | 0.9 (33.6) | 0.9 (33.6) | 4.5 (40.1) | 9.4 (48.9) | 14.8 (58.6) | 18.7 (65.7) | 24.0 (75.2) | 23.7 (74.7) | 18.2 (64.8) | 11.0 (51.8) | 4.7 (40.5) | 0.4 (32.7) | 10.9 (51.7) |
| Daily mean °C (°F) | −5.0 (23.0) | −5.1 (22.8) | −1.2 (29.8) | 3.5 (38.3) | 8.6 (47.5) | 12.3 (54.1) | 16.3 (61.3) | 15.8 (60.4) | 11.1 (52.0) | 4.8 (40.6) | −0.8 (30.6) | −5.1 (22.8) | 4.6 (40.3) |
| Mean daily minimum °C (°F) | −10.9 (12.4) | −10.8 (12.6) | −7.0 (19.4) | −2.4 (27.7) | 2.2 (36.0) | 6.0 (42.8) | 8.5 (47.3) | 7.8 (46.0) | 4.0 (39.2) | −1.4 (29.5) | −6.2 (20.8) | −10.4 (13.3) | −1.7 (28.9) |
| Record low °C (°F) | −43.3 (−45.9) | −39.4 (−38.9) | −36.1 (−33.0) | −26.7 (−16.1) | −14.4 (6.1) | −4.4 (24.1) | −3.0 (26.6) | −7.0 (19.4) | −15.6 (3.9) | −26.7 (−16.1) | −34.0 (−29.2) | −43.9 (−47.0) | −43.9 (−47.0) |
| Average precipitation mm (inches) | 21.8 (0.86) | 29.0 (1.14) | 35.5 (1.40) | 59.2 (2.33) | 77.7 (3.06) | 108.0 (4.25) | 34.7 (1.37) | 37.8 (1.49) | 45.2 (1.78) | 29.8 (1.17) | 30.8 (1.21) | 25.0 (0.98) | 534.5 (21.04) |
| Average rainfall mm (inches) | 0.0 (0.0) | 0.0 (0.0) | 1.5 (0.06) | 10.9 (0.43) | 59.2 (2.33) | 108.2 (4.26) | 35.5 (1.40) | 38.9 (1.53) | 45.0 (1.77) | 7.6 (0.30) | 1.3 (0.05) | 0.8 (0.03) | 308.9 (12.16) |
| Average snowfall cm (inches) | 25.5 (10.0) | 29.2 (11.5) | 38.2 (15.0) | 54.6 (21.5) | 19.7 (7.8) | 1.9 (0.7) | 0.0 (0.0) | 1.7 (0.7) | 2.4 (0.9) | 24.2 (9.5) | 31.5 (12.4) | 27.5 (10.8) | 256.4 (100.8) |
| Average precipitation days (≥ 0.2 mm) | 5.2 | 5.6 | 7.4 | 6.9 | 8.9 | 10.3 | 5.3 | 5.5 | 6.8 | 4.9 | 5.3 | 5.3 | 77.4 |
| Average rainy days (≥ 0.2 mm) | 0.0 | 0.0 | 0.42 | 1.9 | 6.8 | 9.7 | 5.1 | 5.3 | 5.6 | 1.4 | 0.29 | 0.06 | 36.57 |
| Average snowy days (≥ 0.2 cm) | 4.3 | 4.1 | 5.4 | 4.6 | 1.8 | 0.06 | 0.0 | 0.11 | 0.5 | 2.8 | 3.8 | 3.6 | 31.07 |
Source: Environment Canada

== Demographics ==
The population of Carway according to the 2008 municipal census conducted by Cardston County is 2.

== See also ==
- Piegan–Carway Border Crossing
- List of communities in Alberta
- List of hamlets in Alberta
- List of geographic names derived from portmanteaus
