= Orton, Alberta =

Orton
- Hamlet
- Location of Orton Orton (Canada)
- Coordinates: 49°43′39″N 113°15′11″W
- Country: Canada
- Province: Alberta
- Region: Southern Alberta
- Census division: 3
- Municipal district: Municipal District of Willow Creek No. 26

Government
  - Type: Unincorporated
  - Governing body: Municipal District of Willow Creek No. 26 Council

Area (2021)
  - Land: 1.56 km^{2} (0.60 sq mi)

Population (2021)
  - Total: 180
  - Density: 115.4/km^{2} (299/sq mi)
- Time zone: UTC−06:00 (Alberta Time)
- Area codes: 403, 587, 825

Orton is a hamlet in southern Alberta, Canada within the Municipal District of Willow Creek No. 26. It is located 6 kilometres (3.7 mi) south of Highway 3, approximately 31 kilometres (19 mi) west of Lethbridge.

== Demographics ==
Population history of Orton
Year	Pop.	±%
1986	62	—
1991	105	+69.4%
1991A	106	+1.0%
1996	101	−4.7%
2001	116	+14.9%
2006	116	+0.0%
2011	122	+5.2%
2016	141	+15.6%
2021	180	+27.7%
Source: Statistics Canada

In the 2021 Census of Population conducted by Statistics Canada, Orton had a population of 180 living in 48 of its 50 total private dwellings, a change of 27.7% from its 2016 population of 141. With a land area of 1.56 km^{2} (0.60 sq mi), it had a population density of 115.4/km^{2} (298.8/sq mi) in 2021.

As a designated place in the 2016 Census of Population conducted by Statistics Canada, Orton had a population of 141 living in 39 of its 43 total private dwellings, a change of 15.6% from its 2011 population of 122. With a land area of 1.56 km^{2} (0.60 sq mi), it had a population density of 90.4/km^{2} (234.1/sq mi) in 2016.

== See also ==
- List of communities in Alberta
- List of designated places in Alberta
- List of hamlets in Alberta
