= Payne Lake (Alberta) =

Lake in Alberta, Canada

- Location within Alberta
- Location: Cardston County, Alberta
- Coordinates: 49°06′39″N 113°39′13″W
- Basin countries: Canada
- Max. length: 2.2 km (1.4 mi)
- Max. width: 3.1 km (1.9 mi)
- Surface area: 2.28 km^{2} (0.88 sq mi)
- Average depth: 3.8 m (12 ft)
- Max. depth: 7.3 m (24 ft)
- Surface elevation: 1,343 m (4,406 ft)

Payne Lake is a lake in Alberta, Canada.
