= Glenwood, Alberta =

Municipality in Alberta, Canada (est. 1961)

Glenwood
- Village
- Village of Glenwood
- Location within Alberta
- Coordinates: 49°21′49″N 113°30′38″W
- Country: Canada
- Province: Alberta
- Region: Southern Alberta
- Census division: 3
- Municipal district: Cardston County
- Incorporated
  - Village: January 1, 1961

Government
  - Mayor: Albert Elias
  - Governing body: Glenwood Village Council

Area (2021)
  - Land: 1.37 km^{2} (0.53 sq mi)

Population (2021)
  - Total: 272
  - Density: 197.9/km^{2} (513/sq mi)
- Time zone: UTC−06:00 (Alberta Time)
- Postal code span: T0K 2R0
- Highways: Highway 810; Highway 505
- Waterways: Belly River
- Website: Official website

Glenwood is a village in southern Alberta, Canada. It is located north of the Town of Cardston, in Cardston County. The village was named for a man named Edward Glen Wood. The founder of the village was Edward J. Wood, successor to Latter Day Saint leader Charles Ora Card, the founder of Cardston. Both Glen and Edward Wood were from Salt Lake City, Utah, and are buried in Cardston. The old name for the village was Glenwoodville until 1979.

== History ==
Surveying for the community of originally named Glenwoodville was done by Seymour B. Smith. The townsite was designed in the Latter Day Saints Plat of Zion grid; Glenwood consisted of approximately 640 acres, divided into blocks of eight acres each, and building lots of one acre each with streets eight rods wide running at right angles through the town. Where the town blocks ended, ten-acre lots were surveyed so that the town residents could have a small pasture for livestock.

The original townsite of Glenwood consisted of one block set aside for church buildings, another for district school purposes, and another, larger than the other two, for town park purposes. In the centre of town, along the main street, business lots of fifty foot frontage were marked off.

Originally, the postcode assigned to Glenwood was T0K 0Y0, but due to postal workers confusing it with Tokyo, Japan, the designation was later changed to T0K 2R0.

== Demographics ==
In the 2021 Census of Population conducted by Statistics Canada, the Village of Glenwood had a population of 272 living in 104 of its 124 total private dwellings, a change of −13.9% from its 2016 population of 316. With a land area of 1.37 km^{2} (0.53 sq mi), it had a population density of 198.5/km^{2} (514.2/sq mi) in 2021.

In the 2016 Census of Population conducted by Statistics Canada, the Village of Glenwood recorded a population of 316 living in 107 of its 119 total private dwellings, a 10.1% change from its 2011 population of 287. With a land area of 1.37 km^{2} (0.53 sq mi), it had a population density of 230.7/km^{2} (597.4/sq mi) in 2016.

== See also ==
- List of communities in Alberta
- List of villages in Alberta
