= Remington Carriage Museum =

Museum in Cardston, Alberta, Canada

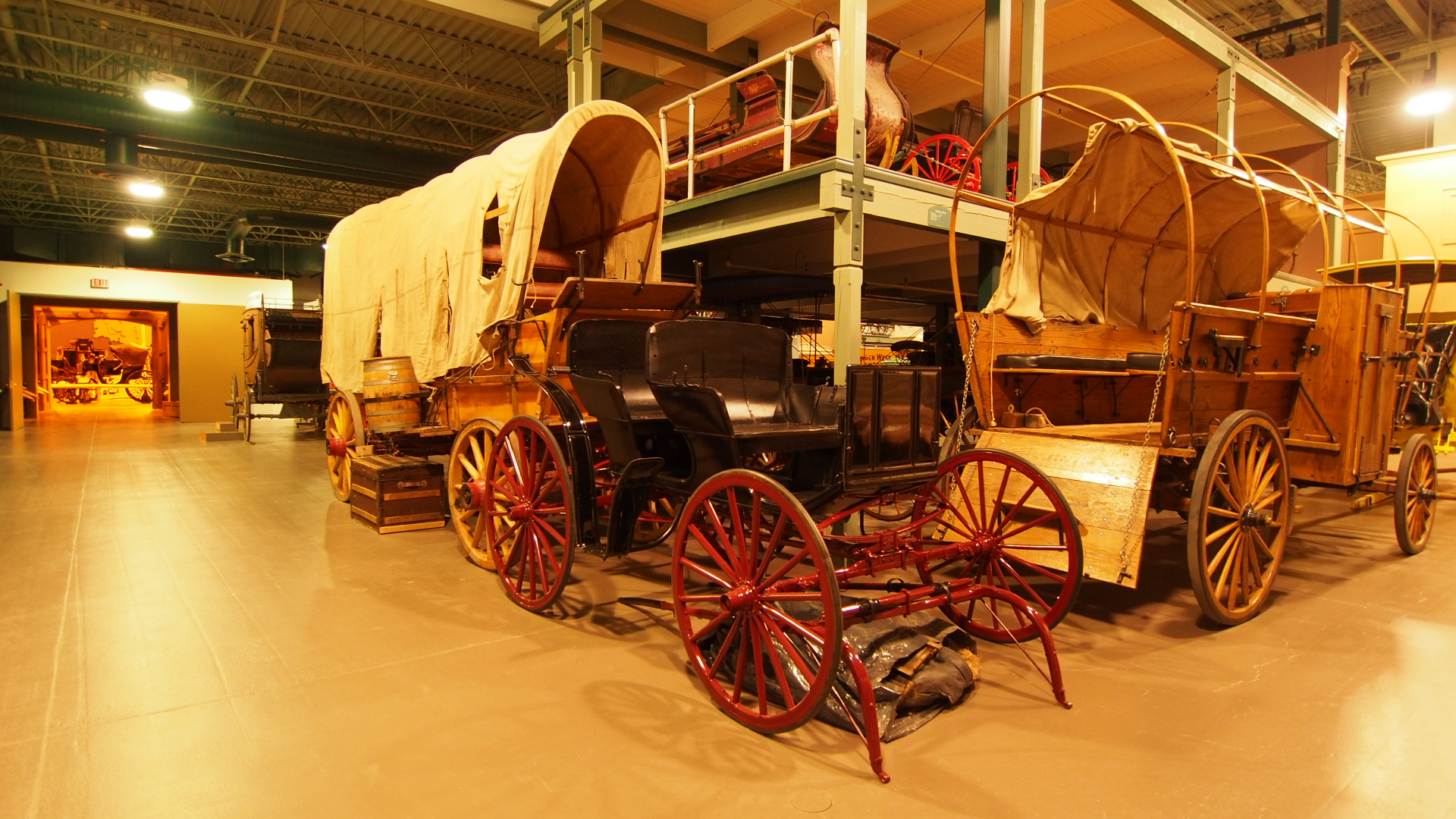

- Location in Alberta
- Established: 1993
- Location: Cardston, Alberta, Canada
- Coordinates: 49.19420°N 113.30204°W
- Type: horse-drawn transportation
- Website: www.remingtoncarriagemuseum.com

The Remington Carriage Museum is located in Cardston, Alberta, Canada. Opened in 1993, and the largest of its kind in the world, the Remington Carriage Museum displays more than 250 carriages.

The 64,000 sq ft (5,900 m^{2}). museum has a working stable, seasonal carriage rides, video displays, an 80-seat theatre, and a gift shop.

== Donald Remington ==
Don Remington (1914–1987), the man behind the Remington Carriage Museum, was a land owner, cattle rancher, developer, bridge builder and philanthropist.

For 35 years, Don Remington and his wife Afton travelled across North America, Britain and the world to obtain then ship carriages back to restore.

Don Remington himself was a coach-builder, carriage restorer and coach, carriage and sleigh historian and it is with first-hand knowledge that he restored the carriages in his collection. Many of the carriages in the Remington Carriage Museum were used in his lifetime.

Remington served on the board of directors for the American Carriage Association, of which he was a lifetime member.

== Royalty, presidents and the Remington collection ==
Remington carriages have transported kings, queens, princes with their princesses, dukes and duchesses, earls, countesses, marquesses, lords and ladies, presidents and world heads of state. Celebrities worldwide have found themselves behind the reins of a Remington carriage. Remington carriages were a part of the world-famous Calgary Stampede and the 1988 Winter Olympic Games. Calgary Heritage Park Days and Spruce Meadows International Equestrian Horse Shows often feature the Remington collection. Remington carriages have attended hundreds of parades worldwide.

Queen Elizabeth II of Canada along with her husband Prince Philip and her son Prince Charles rode in a Remington landau carriage whilst visiting Canada in 1973 and again whilst visiting in 1980.

The Studebaker Company made a landau carriage for Ulysses S. Grant while he was president of the United States in 1869 - 1877. This carriage is featured in the Remington Carriage Museum.

Alfred Gwynne Vanderbilt owned an original Royal Hansom Cab 1910, located at the Remington Carriage Museum. Don Remington purchased the Vanderbilt cab in New York, then stabilized the carriage and maintained its original Vanderbilt logo, finishes and trimmings. The Royal Hansom Cab frequented the cobbled streets of London, Paris and New York City between 1870 and 1930, prior to the automobile taxis.

The Remington Barouche carried numerous dignitaries, including Prince Philip and Prince Andrew, Prime Minister Pierre Trudeau, Alberta premiers Ralph Klein and Peter Lougheed, Governor General of Canada Madame Sauve', Mormon President Kimball & President Benson of the LDS Church.

Abraham Lincoln owned an identical barouche while he was president of the United States.

When the Prime Minister of Canada, Diefenbaker went 'Out West' during his sojourn, as Prime Minister his day ride was a Remington Barouche carriage.

The Five Glass Landau Coach, made by James Cunningham, Son and Company, Rochester, New York, circa 1890.

In the early 1970s, while Don Remington was visiting England, he came across a man named Colonel Graville Williams who sold him the carriage BBreak by Holland & Holland, London.

Remington's Royal Hansom Cab #4212 Made by Forder & Company Limited, Wolverhampton, England Circa 1870.

== The famous Concord coach ==
Concord Wells Fargo Remington Collection... Concord Stagecoach Wells Fargo

Another Concord in the collection is an original Buffalo Bill's Stages North Platte Nebraska stagecoach.

== Notables in the Remington Collection ==
The Wells Fargo & Co. Yellowstone Wagon, made by Abbot-Downing Company, Concord, New Hampshire, circa 1886. This carriage was later used as a touring wagon in Yellowstone National Park. When Don Remington set about restoring the wagon, they found the original Wells Fargo & Co. lettering on each side.

== Hollywood and The Remington Collection ==
The popular Fox television show The Simpsons episode 17 of the 17th season, "Kiss Kiss, Bang Bangalore", features sisters Patty and Selma kidnapping Richard Dean Anderson, the actor who played action hero in their favorite TV show MacGyver. Selma and Patty show Dean vacation slide shows including various carriages from the Remington Carriage Museum with a front image of Patty and Selma standing next to a bronze statue of the museum's visionary, Don Remington.

Hollywood has made the covered wagon and stagecoach icons of the idealized Old West, and the Remington Carriage Museum has both, including coaches used in past and present Hollywood productions. Visitors can climb aboard the stagecoach used by Jackie Chan in Disney's Shanghai Noon and by Tom Selleck in Crossfire Trail.

The Fay Wray Fountain Memorial is located one block from the Remington Carriage Museum. Fay Wray rose to fame as the dame in distress in the immortal 1933 film King Kong. When Fay Wray returned to Cardston in 1967, she rode in a Remington Concord Stagecoach. Cowboy Country Television profiled Don Remington, season 4 episode 12.

== Horses and The Remington Collection ==
The story of 19th century transportation would be incomplete without the horse, and the museum's herd of Canadians, Quarter Horses and Standard Breds are a major feature of daily programs. An elegant equestrian eventing program is also featured at the museum, demonstrating the skill and protocol of competitive driving horses in harness. Each horse breed is selected to support the ride program at the museum.

Tack is also an important part of the carriage, Don Remington made thousands of unique one of a kind tack...

The Remington Carriage Museum is part of a network of historic sites and museums in Alberta which include Head-Smashed-In Buffalo Jump, a UNESCO World Heritage Site and the Frank Slide Centre. The museum is open year-round, 7 days a week. Cardston is also home to the first Mormon LDS temple built outside the United States.

== Affiliations ==
The museum is affiliated with CMA, CHIN, and Virtual Museum of Canada.
