= Hill Spring =

Municipality in Alberta, Canada (est. 1961)

- Village
- Village of Hill Spring
- Motto: Prairie to Peak Perfection
- Location within Alberta
- Coordinates: 49°17′27″N 113°37′26″W
- Country: Canada
- Province: Alberta
- Region: Southern Alberta
- Census Division: 3
- Municipal district: Cardston County
- Incorporated
  - Village: January 1, 1961

Government
  - Mayor: Monte Christensen
  - Governing body: Hill Spring Village Council

Area (2021)
  - Land: 0.96 km^{2} (0.37 sq mi)
- Elevation: 1,175 m (3,855 ft)

Population (2021)
  - Total: 168
  - Density: 174.8/km^{2} (453/sq mi)
- Time zone: UTC−06:00 (Alberta Time)
- Postal code: T0K 1E0
- Area code: 403
- Highways: Highway 800
- Waterways: Waterton River, Waterton Reservoir
- Website: Official website

Hill Spring is a village in southern Alberta, Canada. It is located 32 km (20 mi) west of Cardston and 43 km (27 mi) southeast of Pincher Creek, in the foothills of the Canadian Rockies.

== History ==
Hill Spring was founded in 1910 by Church of Jesus Christ of Latter-day Saints leader Edward J. Wood.

== Demographics ==
In the 2021 Census of Population conducted by Statistics Canada, the Village of Hill Spring had a population of 168 living in 73 of its 92 total private dwellings, a change of 3.7% from its 2016 population of 162. With a land area of 0.96 km^{2} (0.37 sq mi), it had a population density of 175.0/km^{2} (453.2/sq mi) in 2021.

In the 2016 Census of Population conducted by Statistics Canada, the Village of Hill Spring recorded a population of 162 living in 74 of its 92 total private dwellings, a −12.9% change from its 2011 population of 186. With a land area of 0.96 km^{2} (0.37 sq mi), it had a population density of 168.8/km^{2} (437.1/sq mi) in 2016.

== Notable people ==
Nathan Eldon Tanner, who served in the Alberta Legislature and the First Presidency of the Church of Jesus Christ of Latter-day Saints, lived and taught school in Hill Spring.

== See also ==
- Latter-day Saint settlements in Canada
- List of communities in Alberta
- List of villages in Alberta
