= Beazer, Alberta =

Beazer
- Hamlet
- Location of Beazer Beazer (Canada)
- Coordinates: 49°06′54″N 113°29′01″W
- Country: Canada
- Province: Alberta
- Region: Southern Alberta
- Census division: 3
- Municipal district: Cardston County

Government
  - Type: Unincorporated
  - Governing body: Cardston County Council

Population (2008)
  - Total: 11
- Time zone: UTC−06:00 (Alberta Time)
- Area codes: 403, 587, 825

Beazer is a hamlet in southern Alberta, Canada within Cardston County. It is located 6 kilometres (3.7 mi) south of Highway 5, approximately 80 kilometres (50 mi) southwest of Lethbridge.

== Toponymy ==
Beazer is named for Mark Beazer (1854–1937), who organized the locality's first congregation of the Church of Jesus Christ of Latter-day Saints (LDS Church), and also served as its first postmaster.

== History ==
=== Pre-settlement ===
Between 1867 and 1870, the site that eventually became Beazer was occupied by William Samuel (or Samual) Lee, one of southern Alberta's earliest non-Indigenous settlers. Originally from England, Lee established a trading post near a ford west of present-day Beazer, which is today known as Lee Creek. He traded goods with local First Nations for bison hides.

=== Beazer: 1890-present ===
Beazer's first homesteader was Mark Beazer, who bought land there in 1890 and served as the locality's first bishop for congregants of the LDS Church.

A small community of primarily Mormon farmers developed around Beazer's homestead, and, in December 1903, Beazer opened a post office for the area under his family name. Beazer Chapel formed the centre of Beazer Ward, and was also used as a schoolhouse. By December 1930, the Beazer Ward had a population of 141 LDS parishioners.

Nonetheless, Beazer's subsequent growth was stunted by a lack of convenient transport links, and from a dearth of terrain suitable for irrigation. Many children of its original settlers left for other opportunities upon reaching adulthood, though Beazer remained consistently populated enough that it was recognized as a hamlet by the federal government in 1942.

Extended relations of Mark Beazer operated Beazer's post office until it permanently closed in April 1968, owing to its "limited usefulness." The Beazer Chapel and Beazer Ward closed the next year. By 1977, Beazer was a small residential and agricultural community with no commercial operations, except for a hotel.

== Demographics ==
As of the 2008 municipal census conducted by Cardston County, Beazer has a population of 11.

== Places of interest ==
A hotel, Chateau Isabella, serves tourists who visit the area to utilize its proximity to national parks in Alberta and Montana, including Waterton Lakes National Park and Police Outpost Provincial Park.

Beazer Cemetery, founded in the 1890s, remains operational and accessible to the public as of 2025.

== Notable residents ==
- DonnaJean Wilde – long-time resident of Beazer who set the world record for the most push-ups in one hour by a woman (1,575) in 2024.

== See also ==
- List of communities in Alberta
- List of hamlets in Alberta
