= Mountain View, Alberta =

Mountain View
- Hamlet
- Location of Mountain View in Alberta
- Coordinates: 49.1344°N 113.5964°W
- Country: Canada
- Province: Alberta
- Census division: No. 3
- Municipal district: Cardston County

Government
  - Type: Unincorporated
  - Governing body: Cardston County Council

Area (2021)
  - Land: 1.24 km^{2} (0.48 sq mi)
- Elevation: 1,310 m (4,300 ft)

Population (2021)
  - Total: 87
  - Density: 70.3/km^{2} (182/sq mi)
- Time zone: UTC−06:00 (Alberta Time)

Mountain View is a hamlet in Alberta, Canada within Cardston County. It is located along Highway 5 approximately 25 kilometres (16 mi) west of Cardston and 20 kilometres (12 mi) east of Waterton Lakes National Park near the United States border. It is also a kickoff point for visitors to Police Outpost Provincial Park, 18 kilometers to the south.

The hamlet is located in Census Division No. 3 and in the federal riding of Medicine Hat—Cardston—Warner. It is administered by Cardston County. It was originally named Fish Creek and named Mountain View in 1893.

== Demographics ==
In the 2021 Census of Population conducted by Statistics Canada, Mountain View had a population of 87 living in 29 of its 34 total private dwellings, a change of −3.3% from its 2016 population of 90. With a land area of 1.24 km^{2} (0.48 sq mi), it had a population density of 70.2/km^{2} (181.7/sq mi) in 2021.

As a designated place in the 2016 Census of Population conducted by Statistics Canada, Mountain View had a population of 90 living in 29 of its 38 total private dwellings, a change of 12.5% from its 2011 population of 80. With a land area of 1.27 km^{2} (0.49 sq mi), it had a population density of 70.9/km^{2} (183.5/sq mi) in 2016.

== See also ==
- List of communities in Alberta
- List of designated places in Alberta
- List of former urban municipalities in Alberta
- List of hamlets in Alberta
