= Del Bonita, Alberta =

Del Bonita
- Hamlet
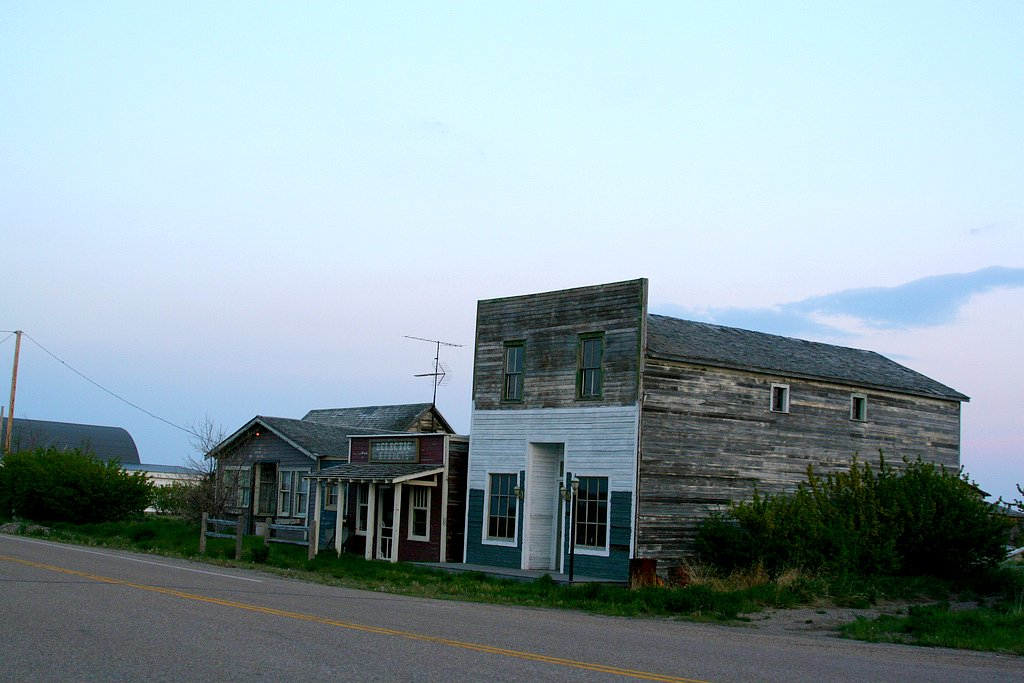

- Location of Del Bonita in Alberta Del Bonita (Canada)
- Coordinates: 49.0294°N 112.7906°W
- Country: Canada
- Province: Alberta
- Census division: No. 3
- Municipal district: Cardston County

Government
  - Type: Unincorporated
  - Governing body: Cardston County Council
- Elevation: 1,305 m (4,281 ft)

Population (2008)
  - Total: 6
- Time zone: UTC−06:00 (Alberta Time)

Del Bonita is a hamlet in southern Alberta, Canada within Cardston County. It is located approximately 49 km (30 mi) south of Magrath at the junction of Highway 62 and Highway 501. Due to its location near the Canada–United States border, it serves as a port of entry into the U.S. state of Montana at the nearby Del Bonita Border Crossing which is located 3 km (1.9 mi) to the south. Del Bonita is a name derived from Spanish meaning "of the pretty".

Del Bonita lies at an elevation of 1,305 m (4,281 ft), on Shanks Creek, which flows into Shanks Lake and further east into the Milk River.

Del Bonita/Whetstone International Airport (FAA LID: H28, TC LID: CEQ4) is located 2 nautical miles (4 km; 2 mi) south of the settlement, on the Canada–United States border.

== Demographics ==
The population of Del Bonita according to the 2008 municipal census conducted by Cardston County is 6.

== Attractions ==
Various buildings and artifacts from the Whiskey Gap ghost town have been moved to Del Bonita, including the Whiskey Gap Oil Shed and the Huey Gum Restaurant, Pool Hall and Rooms.

== Notable people ==
- Earl W. Bascom (1906-1995), cowboy, rodeo champion, "father of modern rodeo", inventor, Hollywood actor, cowboy artist and sculptor, worked in Del Bonita in the mid 1920s for the Orgill Ranch and trailed horses to British Columbia for rancher Lamonde "Nick" Carter.

== See also ==
- List of communities in Alberta
- List of hamlets in Alberta
- List of ghost towns in Alberta
