= Police Outpost Provincial Park =

Provincial park in Alberta, Canada

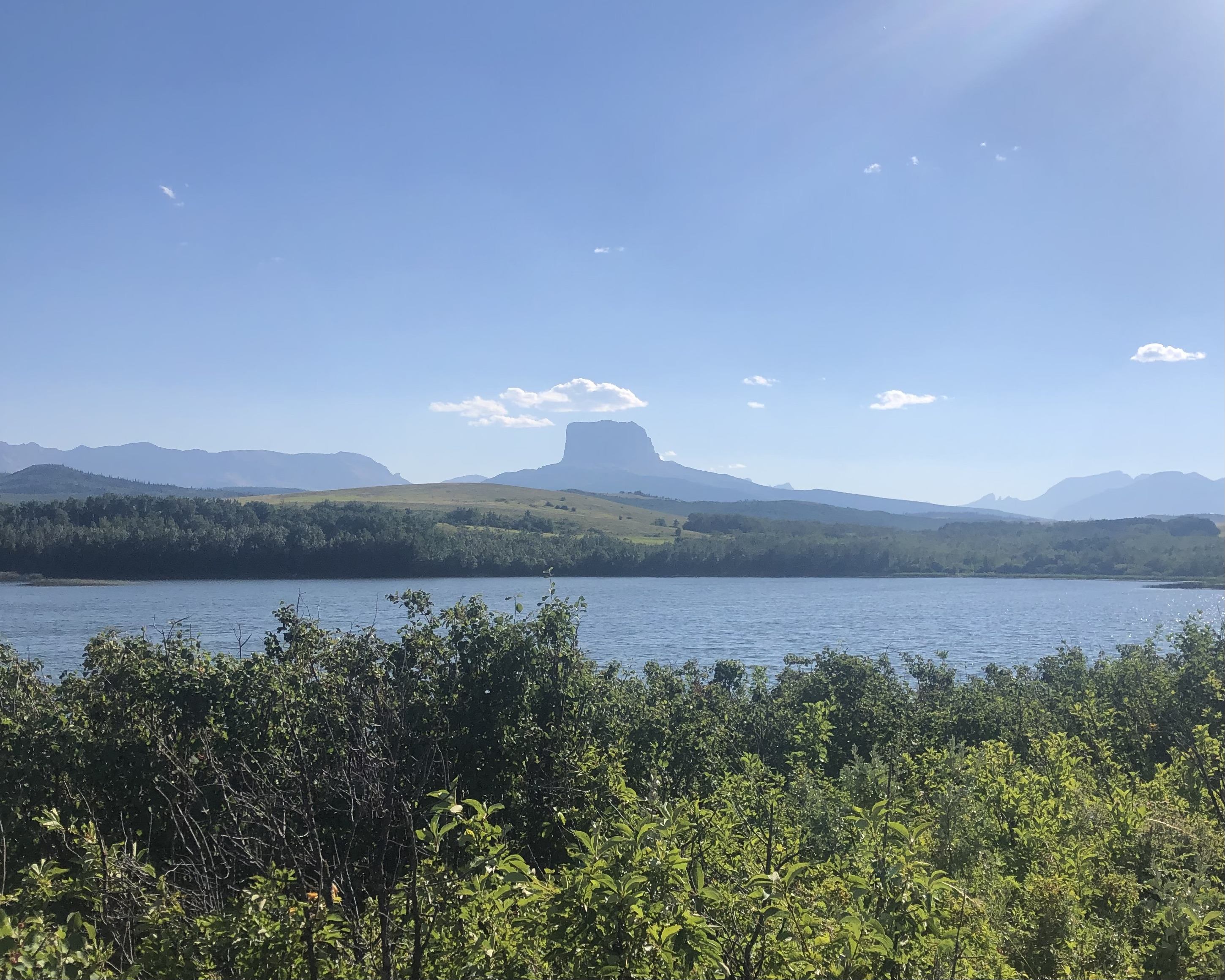
- View of Chief Mountain from the park

- Location within Alberta
- Interactive map of Police Outpost Provincial Park
- Location: Cardston County, Alberta, Canada
- Nearest city: Cardston
- Coordinates: 49°00′22″N 113°27′44″W
- Area: 2.2 km^{2} (0.85 sq mi)
- Established: April 21, 1970
- Governing body: Alberta Tourism, Parks and Recreation

Police Outpost Provincial Park is a provincial park in southern Alberta, Canada, located 32 kilometers (20 mi) south of Cardston.

The park was established on April 21, 1970. It is situated on the Canada/United States border, on the shores of Outpost Lake, at an elevation of 1,390 meters (4,560 ft). South of the border lies the Blackfeet Indian Reservation in Glacier County, Montana.

== Activities ==
The following activities are available in the park:

- Birdwatching (loons, swans, sandhill cranes)
- Camping
- Canoeing and kayaking
- Cross-country skiing (7 km (4.3 mi) ungroomed trails)
- Fishing is open from April 1 to October 31 (effective 2008) which generally precludes ice fishing. Rainbow trout are the main sportfish.
- Front country hiking
- Power boating

== See also ==
- List of provincial parks in Alberta
- List of Canadian provincial parks
- List of National Parks of Canada
