= Aetna, Alberta =

Aetna
- Hamlet
- Location of Aetna Aetna (Canada)
- Coordinates: 49°08′02″N 113°14′24″W
- Country: Canada
- Province: Alberta
- Region: Southern Alberta
- Census division: 3
- Municipal district: Cardston County

Government
  - Type: Unincorporated
  - Governing body: Cardston County Council

Area (2021)
  - Land: 0.95 km^{2} (0.37 sq mi)

Population (2021)
  - Total: 109
  - Density: 114.6/km^{2} (297/sq mi)
- Time zone: UTC−06:00 (Alberta Time)
- Area codes: 403, 587, 825

Aetna is a hamlet in southern Alberta, Canada within Cardston County, located 2 kilometres (1.2 mi) east of Highway 2, approximately 70 kilometres (43 mi) southwest of Lethbridge.

Settlement of the Aetna area began in 1888. Until 1893, the area was known as Snake Creek. In 1893 the community was named after Mount Etna by John W. Taylor, apostle for the Church of Jesus Christ of Latter-day Saints, who said a nearby hill resembled the Sicilian mountain.

== Demographics ==
Population history of Aetna
Year	Pop.	±%
1911	164	—
1941	129	−21.3%
1951	84	−34.9%
1956	61	−27.4%
1961	34	−44.3%
1966	51	+50.0%
1971	29	−43.1%
1981	90	+210.3%
1986	92	+2.2%
1991	88	−4.3%
2011	75	−14.8%
2016	113	+50.7%
2021	109	−3.5%
Source: Statistics Canada

In the 2021 Census of Population conducted by Statistics Canada, Aetna had a population of 109 living in 35 of its 37 total private dwellings, a change of −3.5% from its 2016 population of 113. With a land area of 0.95 km^{2} (0.37 sq mi), it had a population density of 114.7/km^{2} (297.2/sq mi) in 2021.

As a designated place in the 2016 Census of Population conducted by Statistics Canada, Aetna had a population of 113 living in 31 of its 33 total private dwellings, a change of 50.7% from its 2011 population of 75. With a land area of 0.95 km^{2} (0.37 sq mi), it had a population density of 118.9/km^{2} (308.1/sq mi) in 2016.

== See also ==
- List of communities in Alberta
- List of hamlets in Alberta
