= Division No. 3, Alberta =

Census division in Canada

Coordinates: 49°43′48″N 113°24′00″W

Division No. 3
- Census division in Alberta
- Country: Canada
- Province: Alberta

Area
  - Total: 13,866 km^{2} (5,354 sq mi)

Population (2021)
  - Total: 40,768
  - Density: 2.9401/km^{2} (7.6149/sq mi)

Division No. 3 is a census division in Alberta, Canada. It is located in the southwest corner of southern Alberta and its largest urban community is the Town of Claresholm.

== Census subdivisions ==
The following census subdivisions (municipalities or municipal equivalents) are located within Alberta's Division No. 3.

- Towns
  - Cardston
  - Claresholm
  - Fort Macleod
  - Granum
  - Magrath
  - Nanton
  - Pincher Creek
  - Stavely
- Villages
  - Cowley
  - Glenwood
  - Hill Spring
- Hamlets
  - Aetna
  - Beaver Mines
  - Beazer
  - Carway
  - Del Bonita
  - Granum
  - Kimball
  - Leavitt
  - Lundbreck
  - Mountain View
  - Orton
  - Parkland
  - Pincher Station
  - Spring Coulee
  - Twin Butte
  - Waterton Park
  - Welling
- Municipal districts
  - Cardston County
  - Pincher Creek No. 9, M.D. of
  - Willow Creek No. 26, M.D. of
- Improvement districts
  - Improvement District No. 4 (Waterton Lakes National Park)
- First Nation reserves
  - Blood 148
  - Blood 148A
  - Piikani 147

== Demographics ==
Historical population
Year	Pop.	±%
1991	36,329	—
1996	37,764	+4.0%
2001	37,580	−0.5%
2006	37,846	+0.7%
2011	38,566	+1.9%
2016	38,956	+1.0%
2021	40,768	+4.7%

In the 2021 Census of Population conducted by Statistics Canada, Division No. 3 had a population of 40,768 living in 14,163 of its 16,229 total private dwellings, a change of 4.7% from its 2016 population of 38,956. With a land area of 13,725.07 km^{2} (5,299.28 sq mi), it had a population density of 3.0/km^{2} (7.7/sq mi) in 2021.

== See also ==
- List of census divisions of Alberta
- List of communities in Alberta
