= Cardston County =

Municipal district in Alberta, Canada

- Municipal district
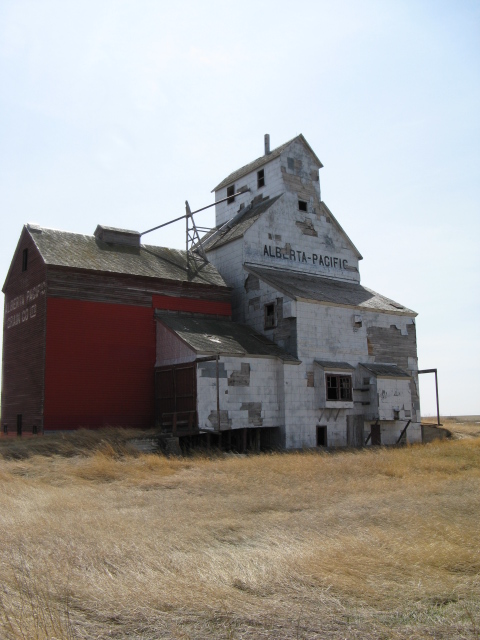
- Oldest grain elevator in Alberta, located in Raley

- Logo

- Location within Alberta
- Country: Canada
- Province: Alberta
- Region: Southern Alberta
- Census division: 3
- Established: 1954
- Incorporated: 1999 (County)

Government
  - Reeve: Randy Bullock
  - Governing body: Cardston County Council
  - Administrative office: Cardston

Area (2021)
  - Land: 3,358.39 km^{2} (1,296.68 sq mi)

Population (2021)
  - Total: 4,856
  - Density: 1.4/km^{2} (3.6/sq mi)
- Time zone: UTC−06:00 (Alberta Time)
- Website: cardstoncounty.com

Cardston County is a municipal district in southern Alberta, Canada. It is located in Census Division 3 around the Town of Cardston.

The municipal district was established on January 1, 1954, through the amalgamation of the Municipal District of Sugar City No. 5 and part of the Municipal District of Cochrane No. 6. On January 1, 2000, the name was changed from Municipal District of Cardston No. 6 to Cardston County

== Lakes ==
- Payne Lake

== Communities and localities ==
The following urban municipalities are surrounded by Cardston County.

Cities

- none

Towns

- Cardston
- Magrath

Villages

- Glenwood
- Hill Spring

Summer villages

- none

The following hamlets are located within Cardston County.

Hamlets

- Aetna
- Beazer
- Carway
- Del Bonita
- Kimball
- Leavitt
- Mountain View
- Spring Coulee
- Welling
- Welling Station
- Woolford

The following localities are located within Cardston County.

Localities

- Boundary Creek
- Bradshaw
- Caldwell
- Colles
- Glenwoodville
- Hacke
- Hartleyville
- Jefferson

- Owendale
- Parkbend
- Raley
- Rush Lake
- Taylorville
- Twin River
- Whiskey Gap

Other places

- Woolford Flat

== Demographics ==
In the 2021 Census of Population conducted by Statistics Canada, Cardston County had a population of 4,856 living in 1,143 of its 1,387 total private dwellings, a change of 8.4% from its 2016 population of 4,481. With a land area of 3,358.39 km^{2} (1,296.68 sq mi), it had a population density of 1.4/km^{2} (3.7/sq mi) in 2021.

In the 2016 Census of Population conducted by Statistics Canada, Cardston County had a population of 4,481 living in 1,043 of its 1,260 total private dwellings, a 7.5% change from its 2011 population of 4,167. With a land area of 3,429.82 km^{2} (1,324.26 sq mi), it had a population density of 1.3/km^{2} (3.4/sq mi) in 2016.

== See also ==
- List of communities in Alberta
- List of municipal districts in Alberta
