= Magrath, Alberta =

Magrath
- Town
- Town of Magrath
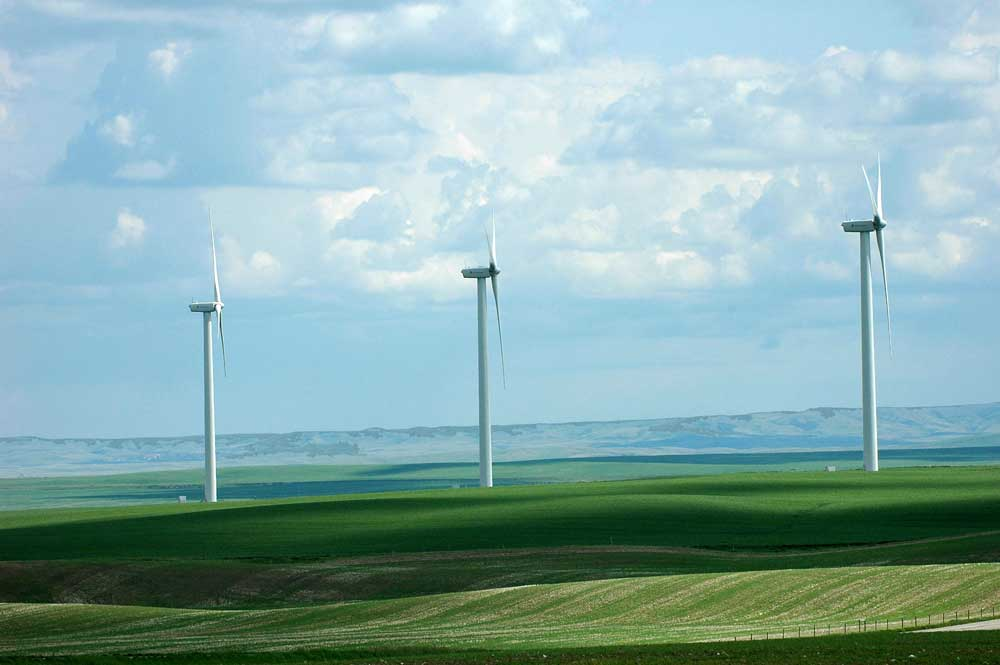
- Wind farm west of Magrath.

- Nickname: Garden City
- Location within Alberta
- Coordinates: 49°25′26″N 112°52′06″W
- Country: Canada
- Province: Alberta
- Region: Southern Alberta
- Census division: 3
- Municipal district: Cardston County
- Incorporated
  - Village: August 20, 1901
  - Town: July 24, 1907
- Named after: Charles Alexander Magrath

Government
  - Mayor: Byrne Cook
  - Governing body: Magrath Town Council
  - CAO: James Suffredine
  - MP: Glen Motz
  - MLA: Joseph Schow

Area (2021)
  - Land: 5.88 km^{2} (2.27 sq mi)
- Elevation: 983 m (3,225 ft)

Population (2021)
  - Total: 2,481
  - Density: 422/km^{2} (1,090/sq mi)
- Time zone: UTC−06:00 (Alberta Time)
- Postal code span: T0K 1J0
- Area code: +1-403
- Website: www.magrath.ca

Magrath is a town in Cardston County, Alberta, Canada. Its population was 2,481 in 2021. Magrath is 32 km (20 mi) (approximately 25 minutes) south of Lethbridge and 242 km (150 mi) (approximately 2.5 hours) south of Calgary.

== History ==
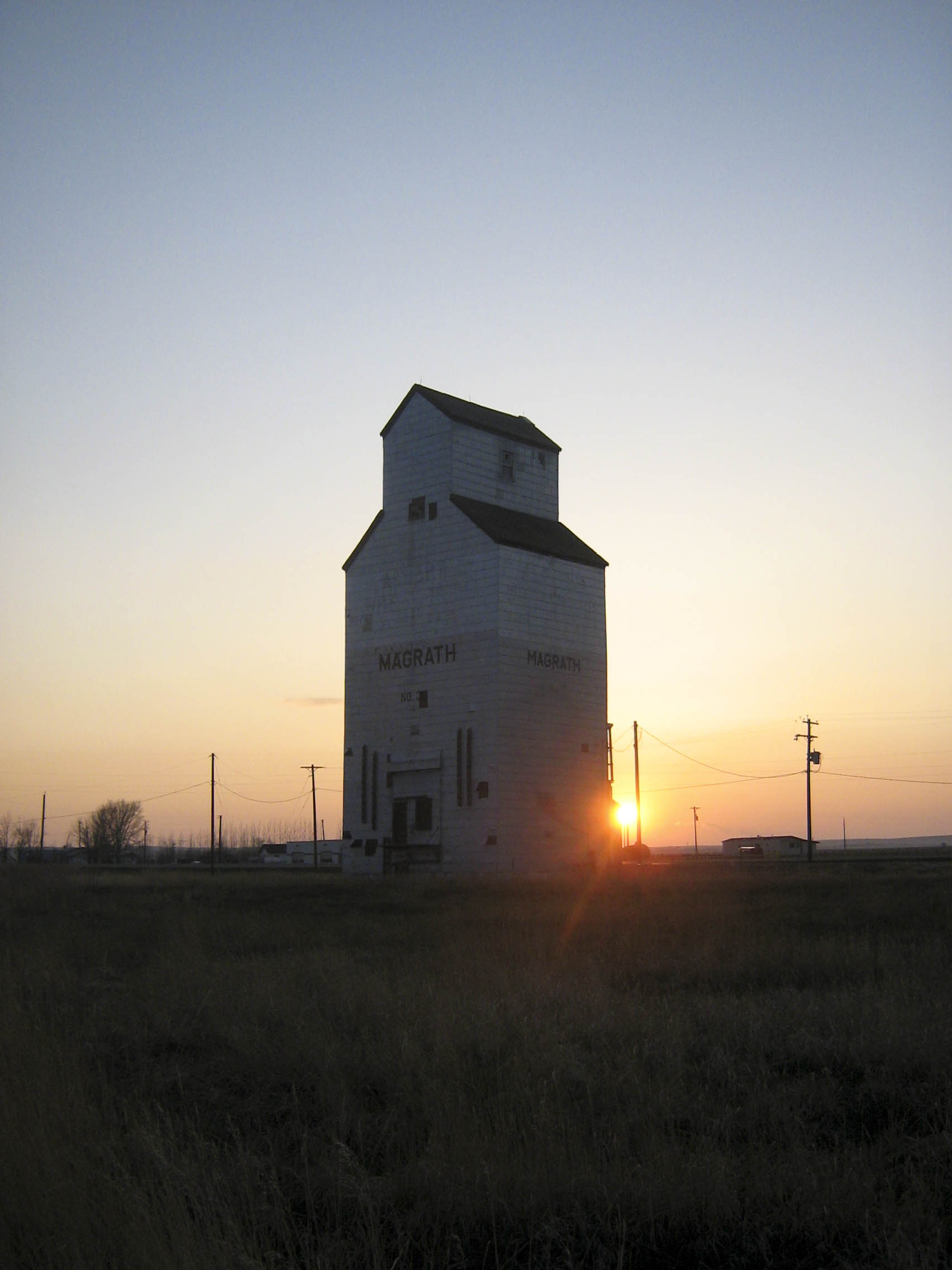
Old grain elevator in Magrath

Magrath was established in 1899 by settlers sent by the Church of Jesus Christ of Latter-day Saints (LDS Church) from Utah and Idaho. These Church of Jesus Christ of Latter-day Saints settlers were recruited by the Alberta Railway and Irrigation Company to construct irrigation works in the area funded by British interests by the family of Sir Alexander Galt. The settlers were paid in cash and land in the town. This was the first major irrigation work in Canada and was made possible by the settlers' experience with the extensive irrigation projects undertaken by their church in Utah and Idaho.

The irrigation system was completed in November 1899 and spanned ninety-miles. It was the first large-scale irrigation system in Canada. The area's irrigation canal system supplies water to farmers throughout Southern Alberta and was the first major irrigation project in Canada. In its early years Magrath was known as The Irrigation Capital of Canada, and later as "The Garden City" for its beautiful natural setting and plentiful trees. The design and layout of Magrath was based on the Church of Jesus Christ of Latter-day Saints 'Plat of Zion' urban design model. Magrath also has historical links to the internationally recognized British Garden City tradition which was piloted in England during this same period.

Magrath was named after Charles Alexander Magrath, the son-in-law of Sir Alexander Galt. Magrath post office was established 1 March 1900, with Ammon Mercer as first postmaster.

== Demographics ==
In the 2021 Canadian census, the Town of Magrath had a population of 2,481 living in 803 of its 830 total private dwellings, a change of 4.5% from its 2016 population of 2,374. With a land area of 5.88 km^{2} (2.27 sq mi), it had a population density of 421.9/km^{2} (1,092.8/sq mi) in 2021.

The population of the Town of Magrath according to its 2017 municipal census is 2,435, a change of 1.5% from its 2015 municipal census population of 2,398.

In the Canada 2016 Census, the Town of Magrath recorded a population of 2,374 living in 757 of its 794 total private dwellings, a 7.1% change from its 2011 population of 2,217. With a land area of 5.99 km^{2} (2.31 sq mi), it had a population density of 396.3/km^{2} (1,026.5/sq mi) in 2016.

=== Religious affiliation ===
The following is a breakdown of Magrath's population by religious affiliation from the 2001 federal census.

- Protestant: 84%
- Catholic: 4%
- No religious affiliation: 11%
- Christian Orthodox: <1%
- Christian (unspecified denomination): <1%

Statistics Canada includes 44 churches in its 2001 Protestant definition, including members of the Church of Jesus Christ of Latter-day Saints and the Community of Christ.

The religious affiliation within Magrath is primarily from the LDS Church. There is a stake based in Magrath, which is composed of ten congregations (eight wards and two branches) in the town and surrounding area. As of June 2016, the total membership in the Magrath Alberta Stake was reported as 2433 members.

== Attractions ==
- Buffalo Bin Elevator - Magrath, the first of five ever built in the Province. The "Buffalo Bin" style grain elevator was built as an experiential elevator for Alberta Wheat Pool in the 1970-1980s, today only three of the original buffalo bins remain. The others still standing are Foremost and Fort Saskatchewan.
- Galt Irrigation Canal, first major irrigation project in Canada, a National Historic Site of Canada.
- Galt Canal Nature Trail
- Magrath Golf club
- Magrath Skateboard Park
- Magrath Wind farm

== Notable people ==
- Randall K. Bennett, general authority of the LDS Church.
- Phil Tollestrup (b. 1949), Olympics basketball player and member of the Canadian Basketball Hall of Fame
- Gordon McOmber (1919–2018), Lieutenant Governor for Montana (1988–1989) was born in Magrath.
- Christian Jensen (1868–1958), inductee in the Canadian Agricultural Hall of Fame, namesake of Jensen Reservoir
- Joseph Schow, MLA

== See also ==
- List of communities in Alberta
- List of towns in Alberta
