= Area code 403 =

Telephone area code for southern Alberta

Coordinates: 50.298°N 112.639°W

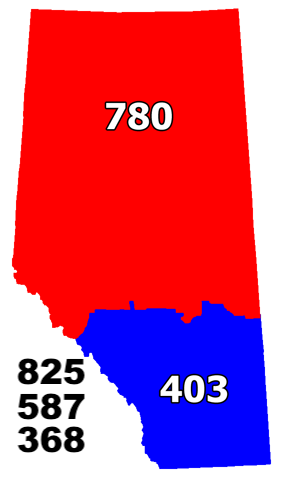
Alberta's numbering plan areas and area codes

Area code 403 is a telephone area code in the North American Numbering Plan (NANP) for the southern third of the Canadian province of Alberta, including the Calgary area. This numbering plan area is also served by area codes 587, 825, and 368, which form a complex overlay for all of Alberta.

== History ==
Area code 403 was one of nine Canadian area codes of the original North American area codes assigned by the American Telephone and Telegraph Company (AT&T) in 1947. Its numbering plan area (NPA) originally comprised the entire province of Alberta. During the course of the expansion of telephone service in the Northwest Territories and Yukon, these were serviced primarily with the same area code starting in 1960. For much of this time, 403 was geographically one of the largest NPAs in North America. On October 21, 1997, area code 867 was formed out of the territories' portion of 403 and the portion of area code 819 located in the Northwest Territories.

By early 1997, area code 403 was threatened by exhaustion because of the rapid growth of telecommunication services demand for pagers, cellphones, and computer modems, as well as growing competition among providers. By September of 1997, Telus Communications and the Canadian Radio and Television Commission initiated relief actions in planning a north/south split of the 403 numbering plan area, with a boundary line drawn north of Red Deer and Stettler. The split became effective on January 25, 1999, so that the northern part, including Edmonton, received the new area code 780. Permissive dialing of 403 for calls terminating in the new 780 numbering plan area continued across the province until July 12, 1999.

Within a decade, area code 403 was close to exhaustion once again. The projected exhaust date was March 2009. The solution for mitigation was to implement area code 587 as a province-wide overlay for both numbering plan areas of the province. Optional ten-digit dialing began on June 23, 2008 and became mandatory on September 12, 2008. On September 20, 2008, Telus Mobility began to assign 587 telephone numbers to new customers in Calgary and Edmonton.

On April 9, 2016, all three numbering plan areas of the province were overlaid with an additional area code, 825.

On January 21, 2022, the province was once again overlaid with another area code, 368.

== Local exchange carriers ==
The incumbent local exchange carrier (ILEC) in 403 is Telus. Prior to 1997, the larger 403 included EdTel (Edmonton Telephones, now part of Telus) and Northwestel as ILECs. Before 1990, Telus was known as Alberta Government Telephones and was a provincial government department.

== Service area and central office codes ==
- Acadia Valley (403)-972
- Acme (403)-546
- Airdrie (403)-316 420 768 912 945 948 960 980
- Alix (403)-747
- Arrowwood (403)-534
- Banff (403)-431 497 760 762 763 778 951 985 996
- Barons (403)-757
- Beiseker (403)-947
- Big Valley (403)-876
- Blackfalds (403)-600 885
- Bragg Creek (403)-949
- Brocket (403)-965
- Brooks (403)-362 363 376 409 427 501 633 793 794 925
- Burdett (403)-833
- Calgary (403)-200 201 202 203 204 205 206 207 208 209 210 212 213 214 215 216 217 218 219 220 221 225 226 228 229 230 231 232 233 234 235 236 237 238 239 240 241 242 243 244 245 246 247 248 249 250 251 252 253 254 255 256 257 258 259 260 261 262 263 264 265 266 267 268 269 270 271 272 273 274 275 276 277 278 279 280 281 282 283 284 285 286 287 288 289 290 291 292 293 294 295 296 297 298 299 300 301 303 305 312 313 319 333 338 351 354 355 365 366 367 369 370 371 374 375 383 384 385 386 387 389 390 397 398 399 400 401 402 404 407 408 410 428 437 440 441 444 450 451 452 453 454 455 456 457 461 462 463 464 465 466 467 470 471 472 473 474 475 476 477 478 479 481 483 487 500 503 508 509 510 512 513 514 515 516 517 519 520 521 523 530 531 532 535 536 537 538 539 540 541 542 543 547 554 560 561 567 568 569 570 571 585 589 590 592 604 605 606 607 608 612 613 614 615 616 617 618 619 620 629 630 640 645 648 650 651 656 660 661 662 663 667 668 669 670 671 680 681 685 686 689 690 691 692 693 695 696 697 698 699 700 701 702 703 705 708 710 714 716 717 718 719 720 723 724 726 727 730 731 735 736 744 747 750 764 765 766 767 769 770 771 774 775 776 777 781 796 797 798 799 800 801 802 803 804 805 806 807 808 809 813 815 816 817 818 819 826 827 828 829 830 831 835 836 837 850 852 860 861 862 863 869 870 873 874 875 879 880 888 889 890 891 899 906 909 910 918 919 920 921 922 923 926 927 931 943 944 955 956 966 968 969 970 971 973 974 975 978 984 987 988 990 991 992 993 997 998 999
- Canmore (403)-493 609 621 675 678 679 688 707 812 953 961
- Cardston (403)-653 659
- Carstairs (403)-337 940
- Castor (403)-882
- Cereal (403)-326
- Champion (403)-897
- Claresholm (403)-468 489 490 625 682 706
- Clive (403)-784
- Coaldale (403)-345 405
- Cochrane (403)-709 840 851 855 907 932 981
- Cowley (403)-751
- Cremona (403)-637
- Coutts (403)-344
- Crossfield (403)-941 946
- Crowsnest Pass (403)-372 459 562 563 564 582 583 623 753
- Delburne (403)-749
- Diamond Valley (403)-933
- Didsbury (403)-335 439 518
- Donalda (403)-883
- Drumheller (403)-321 334 436 494 820 821 823 856
- East Coulee (403)-822
- Eckville (403)-746
- Elkwater (403)-893
- Elnora (403)-773
- Empress (403)-565
- Exshaw (403)-673 674
- Foremost (403)-867
- Fort Macleod (403)-553
- Glenwood (403)-626
- Halkirk (403)-884
- Hanna (403)-857
- High River (403)-336 422 469 498 601 602 603 649 652 841 908
- Hilda (403)-838
- Hill Spring -See Glenwood
- Hussar (403)-787
- Innisfail (403)-227
- Irricana (403)-935
- Irvine (403)-834
- Jenner (403)-898
- Kananaskis Improvement District (403)-591
- Lacombe (403)-782 786 789
- Lake Louise (403)-434 522
- Langdon (403)-936 954
- Leslieville (403)-729
- Lethbridge (403)-308 315 317 320 327 328 329 330 331 332 353 359 360 380 381 382 388 393 394 524 593 634 635 694 715 795 849 892 894 915 929 942
- Lomond (403)-792
- Longview (403)-558
- Magrath (403)-758 759
- Manyberries (403)-868
- Medicine Hat (403)-458 487 488 502 504 525 526 527 528 529 548 580 581 594 712 866 878 905 926 928 952 957 977 979
- Milk River (403)-647
- Milo (403)-599
- Mirror (403)-788
- Morley (403)-881
- Nobleford (403)-824
- Okotoks (403)-306 842 917 938 939 982 995
- Olds (403)-415 438 507 556 559 586 672 791 994
- Penhold (403)-886
- Picture Butte (403)-732
- Pincher Creek (403)-339 432 484 624 627 632 683
- Ponoka (403)-704 783 785 790 913 963
- Raymond (403)-752
- Red Deer (403)-302 304 307 309 314 318 340 341 342 343 346 347 348 349 350 352 356 357 358 373 391 392 396 406 505 506 550 588 596 597 598 713 754 755 848 872 877 896 967 986
- Rimbey (403)-843
- Rocky Mountain House (403)-322 418 429 844 845 846 847 871 895
- Rolling Hills (403)-964
- Schuler (403)-839
- Seven Persons (403)-832
- Stettler (403)-323 430 740 741 742 743 916
- Stirling (403)-756
- Strathmore (403)-324 325 361 480 499 814 901 902 934 962 983
- Sunchild O'Chiese (403)-989
- Sundre (403)-419 426 636 638
- Sylvan Lake (403)-858 864 887
- Taber (403)-223 416
- Three Hills (403)-443 924
- Trochu (403)-442 914
- Turner Valley (403)-933
- Vauxhall (403)-654
- Vulcan (403)-485 486 496
- Walsh (403)-937
- Warner (403)-642
- Waterton Park (403)-859
- Youngstown (403)-779

== See also ==
- List of NANP area codes
- List of Alberta area codes

Alberta area codes: 403, 587/825/368, 780
	North: 780/368/587/825	
West: 250/778/236/672	403/368/587/825	East: 306/639
	South: 406	
British Columbia area codes: 250, 604, 236/257/672/778
Saskatchewan area codes: 306/474/639
Montana area codes: 406
