= Cardston =

- Town
- Town of Cardston
- Aerial view of downtown and the Cardston Alberta Temple

- Flag

- Location in Cardston County

- Location of Cardston in Alberta
- Coordinates: 49°12′09″N 113°18′07″W
- Country: Canada
- Province: Alberta
- Region: Southern Alberta
- Planning region: South Saskatchewan
- Municipal district: Cardston County
- Incorporated
  - Village: December 29, 1898
  - Town: June 2, 1901

Government
  - Mayor: Paula Brown (Previous: Maggie Kronen)
  - Governing body: Cardston Town Council
  - MP: Glen Motz
  - MLA: Joseph Schow

Area (2021)
  - Land: 8.58 km^{2} (3.31 sq mi)
- Elevation: 1,130 m (3,710 ft)

Population (2021)
  - Total: 3,724
  - Density: 434.1/km^{2} (1,124/sq mi)
  - Municipal census (2018): 3,909
- Time zone: UTC−06:00 (Alberta Time)
- Area codes: 403, 587, 825
- Highways: Highway 2 Highway 5 Highway 501
- Waterway: Lee Creek; St. Mary River; St Mary Reservoir
- Website: www.cardston.ca

Cardston is a town in Alberta, Canada. It was first settled in 1887 by members of the Church of Jesus Christ of Latter-day Saints (LDS Church) who travelled from Utah, via the Macleod-Benton Trail, to present-day Alberta in one of the century's last wagon migrations. The founder of the town was Charles Ora Card. The combined church and school was completed by January 29 the year following their arrival.

== History ==
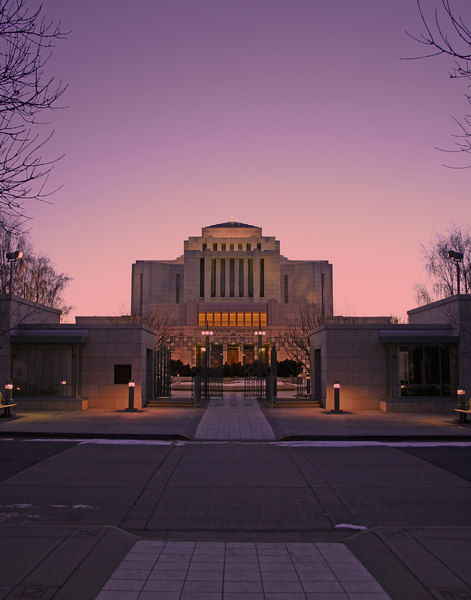
Cardston Alberta Temple of The Church of Jesus Christ of Latter-day Saints

Cardston was first settled in 1887 by members of the Church of Jesus Christ of Latter-day Saints travelling from Utah via the Macleod-Benton Trail. Settlers were trying to escape anti-polygamy laws in the United States enacted during the late 1880s.

Cardston was "dry" (alcohol free) for more than a century after the 1915 Alberta liquor plebiscite. In 2023, following a municipal plebiscite in which residents voted narrowly in favour of the measure, the town council voted 5-2 to allow alcohol to be served in restaurants and recreation facilities such as the local golf course. Liquor stores, lounges, nightclubs and other alcohol-primary businesses remain prohibited, and there are no licensed premises in which to use video lottery terminals.

In 1951, 75% of Cardston's 3,500 residents were members of the LDS Church. In the 1990s some estimates put the number of LDS members at above 90%. It remains at about 80%, as of 2014.

On August 15, 2019, the town was granted a coat of arms by the Canadian Heraldic Authority.

== Geography ==
Cardston is situated in the foothills of southwest Alberta, approximately 25 km (16 mi) north from the American state of Montana. On its north side, it borders the Kainai Nation (Blood Tribe) Reserve, one of the largest reserves in North America. Forty kilometres (25 mi) to the west of Cardston are the Rocky Mountains of Waterton Lakes National Park. Cardston is 77 km (48 mi) southwest of Lethbridge and 234 km (145 mi) south of Calgary.

=== Climate ===
Cardston experiences a humid continental climate (Köppen climate classification Dfb). Along with the rest of southern Alberta, Cardston is subject to chinooks, which often bring temperatures in mid-winter well above 10 °C (50 °F). This same pattern results in more than 200 days of wind a year.

Weather records:

- Hottest temperature: 39.0 °C (102.2 °F) on 23 July 2007 and 9 August 2018
- Coldest temperature: −41.7 °C (−43.1 °F) on 28 January 1929
- Most rain in one day: 106.0 mm (4.17 in) on 6 June 1995
- Most snow in one day: 63.5 cm (25.0 in) on 4 May 1919
- Deepest snow cover: 84 cm (33 in) on 29 April 1967

Climate data for Cardston, 1981–2010 normals, extremes 1918–present
Month	Jan	Feb	Mar	Apr	May	Jun	Jul	Aug	Sep	Oct	Nov	Dec	Year
Record high °C (°F)	19.0 (66.2)	21.0 (69.8)	24.5 (76.1)	30.5 (86.9)	33.0 (91.4)	35.6 (96.1)	39.0 (102.2)	39.0 (102.2)	34.5 (94.1)	29.5 (85.1)	23.9 (75.0)	19.4 (66.9)	39.0 (102.2)
Mean daily maximum °C (°F)	1.4 (34.5)	2.5 (36.5)	5.9 (42.6)	11.5 (52.7)	16.5 (61.7)	20.5 (68.9)	24.5 (76.1)	24.8 (76.6)	19.0 (66.2)	12.8 (55.0)	4.5 (40.1)	1.1 (34.0)	12.1 (53.8)
Daily mean °C (°F)	−4.5 (23.9)	−3.5 (25.7)	−0.1 (31.8)	5.1 (41.2)	9.9 (49.8)	13.8 (56.8)	16.9 (62.4)	16.9 (62.4)	11.8 (53.2)	6.3 (43.3)	−1.1 (30.0)	−4.6 (23.7)	5.6 (42.1)
Mean daily minimum °C (°F)	−10.4 (13.3)	−9.5 (14.9)	−6.1 (21.0)	−1.3 (29.7)	3.3 (37.9)	7.0 (44.6)	9.3 (48.7)	8.9 (48.0)	4.6 (40.3)	−0.2 (31.6)	−6.7 (19.9)	−10.3 (13.5)	−1 (30)
Record low °C (°F)	−41.7 (−43.1)	−38.9 (−38.0)	−36.7 (−34.1)	−25.6 (−14.1)	−12.8 (9.0)	−5.6 (21.9)	−0.5 (31.1)	−3.9 (25.0)	−15.6 (3.9)	−26.5 (−15.7)	−35.6 (−32.1)	−38.5 (−37.3)	−41.7 (−43.1)
Average precipitation mm (inches)	20.8 (0.82)	19.1 (0.75)	37.5 (1.48)	40.6 (1.60)	81.3 (3.20)	90.7 (3.57)	45.5 (1.79)	43.9 (1.73)	53.1 (2.09)	31.6 (1.24)	29.6 (1.17)	21.5 (0.85)	515.0 (20.28)
Average rainfall mm (inches)	0.4 (0.02)	0.0 (0.0)	1.5 (0.06)	10.8 (0.43)	66.7 (2.63)	90.7 (3.57)	45.5 (1.79)	43.7 (1.72)	49.2 (1.94)	9.9 (0.39)	2.1 (0.08)	0.1 (0.00)	320.6 (12.62)
Average snowfall cm (inches)	20.4 (8.0)	19.1 (7.5)	36.0 (14.2)	29.7 (11.7)	14.6 (5.7)	0.0 (0.0)	0.0 (0.0)	0.1 (0.0)	3.6 (1.4)	21.7 (8.5)	27.4 (10.8)	21.4 (8.4)	194.2 (76.5)
Source: Environment and Climate Change Canada

== Demographics ==
In the 2021 Census of Population conducted by Statistics Canada, the Town of Cardston had a population of 3,724 living in 1,261 of its 1,335 total private dwellings, a change of 3.9% from its 2016 population of 3,585. With a land area of 8.58 km^{2} (3.31 sq mi), it had a population density of 434.0/km^{2} (1,124.1/sq mi) in 2021.

In the 2016 Census of Population conducted by Statistics Canada, the Town of Cardston recorded a population of 3,585 living in 1,175 of its 1,270 total private dwellings, a 0.1% change from its 2011 population of 3,580. With a land area of 8.59 km^{2} (3.32 sq mi), it had a population density of 417.3/km^{2} (1,080.9/sq mi) in 2016.

Population by age and gender, 2001
Age	Male	Female	Total
0–4	115	140	255
5–14	335	310	645
15–19	175	180	355
20–24	105	100	205
25–34	125	160	285
35–44	175	210	385
45–54	165	200	365
55–64	125	155	280
65–74	135	170	305
75+	150	260	410
Totals	1600	1870	3470

Source: Statistics Canada 2001 Census (numbers may not add up due to rounding)

Family income, 1996 and 2001
	1996	2001
Total number of families	730	760
Average family income	$53,750	$52,939
Median family income	$46,503	$48,004

Source: Statistics Canada 1996 & 2001 Census

== Economy ==
Cardston's primary industries are education, health care, entrepreneurship, agriculture, and tourism. Alcohol became legally available in Cardston for purchase in 2023, after over 100 years of ban. The Cardston Airport is located to the south-east of the town.

== Attractions ==
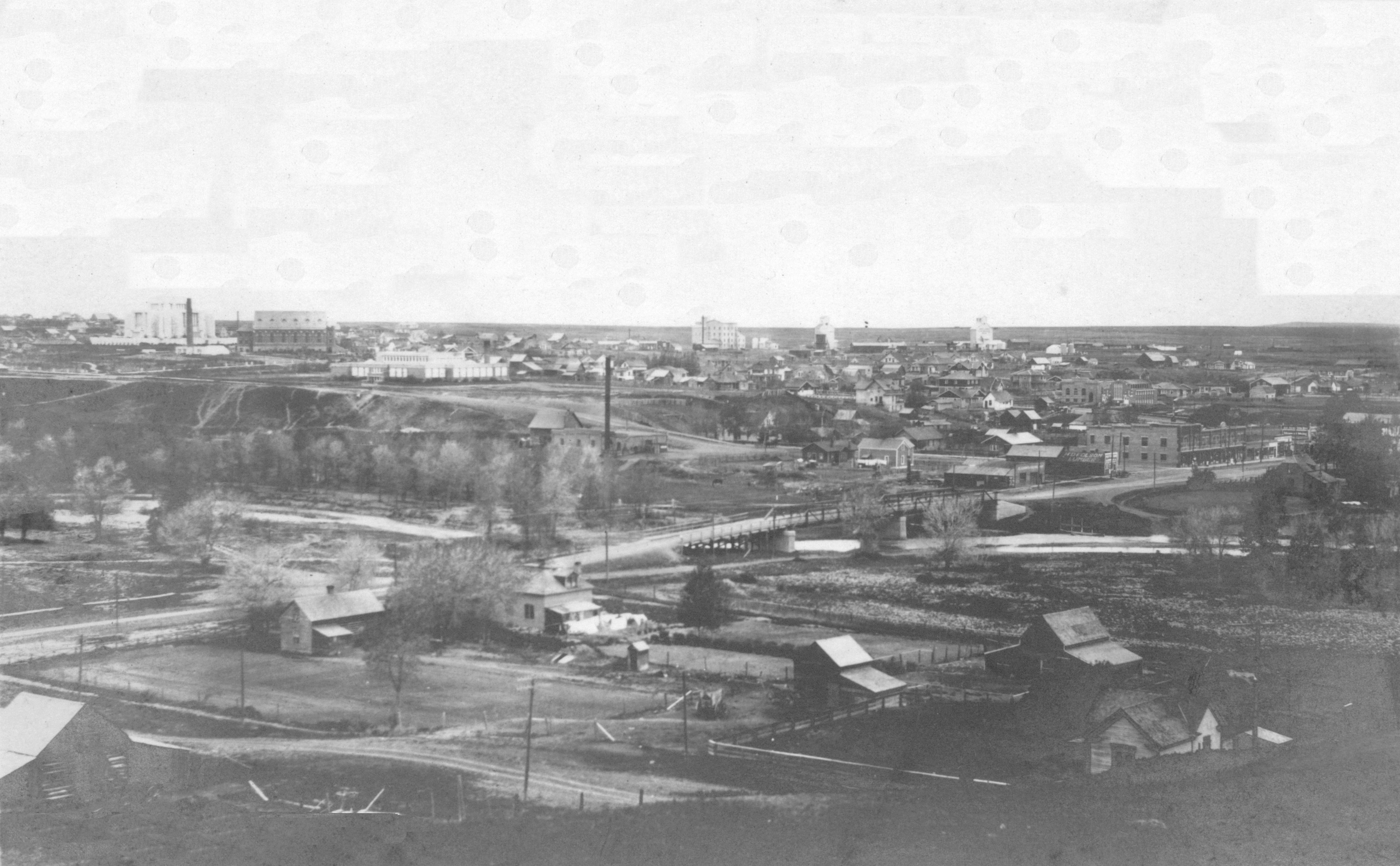
Cardston, circa 1914

Cardston has a soccer park, ball parks, a golf course, an ice skating rink, a swimming pool, tennis courts, hiking trails, a skateboard park, a hockey stadium, several recreation parks, picnic areas and playgrounds. St. Mary's Dam reservoir northeast of Cardston supports water sports in the summer months.

The Cardston Alberta Temple was constructed by Latter-day Saint pioneers from 1913-1923, and was the first temple constructed by the Church outside of the United States. It remained the only temple in Canada until the Toronto Ontario Temple was built in 1990.

The Remington Carriage Museum is the largest collection of horse-drawn vehicles in North America, with more than 250 carriages, wagons and sleighs. The 63,000 sq ft (5,900 m^{2}) facility features video displays, a fire hall, carriage factory, restoration shop, working stable, carriage rides, carriage rentals, a restaurant, guided tours, and a gift shop.

The Carriage House Theatre was constructed in 1912, and underwent renovations in 1937 and 1992. It seats 350 and hosts films, community theatre and professional summer theatre.

The Card Pioneer Home was built by Cardston's founder Charles Ora Card in 1887, and served as a community centre and stopping place for travellers until the first hotel was built in 1894. The log structure stands in its original location and is open for public visits. It is a registered provincial historic site.

The Courthouse Museum is a sandstone structure built in 1907 from stone quarried near Cardston. It was used longer than any other courthouse in Alberta. The building displays the judge's bench, witness box, and jail cells. It is a registered provincial historic site.

== Education ==
Schools include the Cardston High School, the Cardston Jr. High School (formerly Eastridge Elementary School), and Cardston Elementary School which are all under the Westwind School Division.

Former schools include Leeside (grades 1 and 2 - torn down in the late 1980s to make way for the Remington-Alberta Carriage Centre) and Westside. The building that housed many of the junior high facilities, E.J. Wood School (including the gymnasium near the current high school), Parkland School, and John S. Smith Schools were torn down in 1993 as the junior high moved to the former Eastridge building. The Cardston High School underwent extensive renovations in the early 2000s, including an expansion to its gymnasium, much-improved fitness and weight room facilities, wider hallways, and a new cafeteria.

== Media ==
The Cardston News was first published in 1924, and was a weekly until 1925. During 1924–1925, the newspaper was edited and published by Fred Burton. It was later taken over by D.O. Wight, editor and managing director from September 17, 1925 until June 9, 1936. Fred Burton took over as publisher on June 16, 1936. The Cardston News was taken over by Gordon F. West On May 7, 1964. The Cardston Record began publication on August 6, 1898, and was published weekly until September 1901.

== Notable people ==
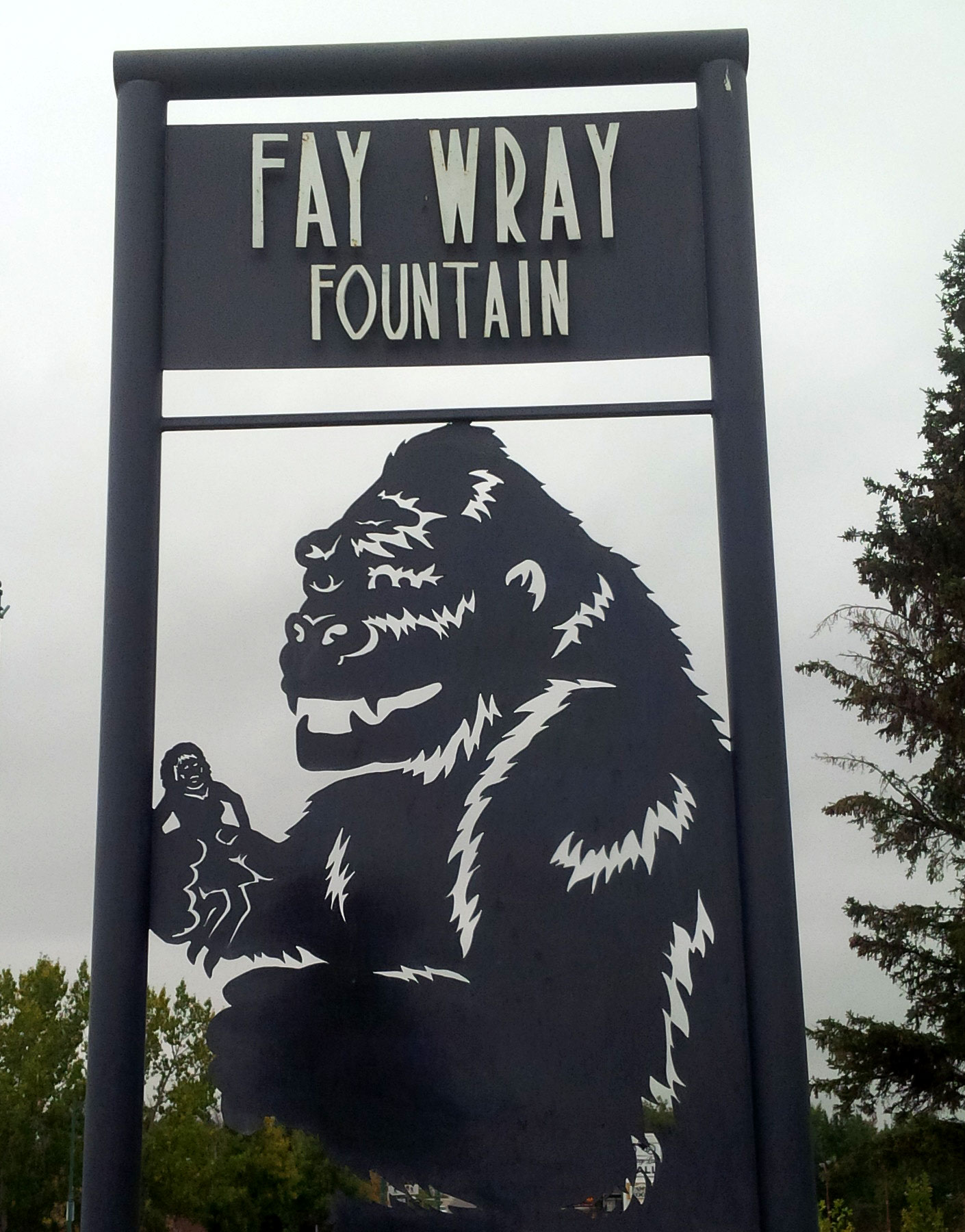
Fay Wray Fountain, Cardston

- Victor L. Brown, world leader in the LDS Church
- Ben Cahoon, CFL slotback who won three Grey Cup championships with the Montreal Alouettes.
- Grant Hunter, UCP MLA for Taber-Warner
- Elaine L. Jack, world leader in the LDS Church
- Merlin R. Lybbert, world leader in the LDS Church
- Shawna Molcak, basketball player who played for Canada in the 1996 Summer Olympics
- Grant Strate, dancer and choreographer
- Elle-MáijáTailfeathers - Blackfoot and Sámi filmmaker, actor, and producer born in Cardston
- Frank Weiss, racing driver
- Edward J. Wood, leader in the LDS Church
- George Woolf, jockey
- Fay Wray, King Kong actress

== See also ==
- Cardston (provincial electoral district)
- Cardston-Chief Mountain
- CFSO-TV
- James Gladstone
- List of communities in Alberta
- List of towns in Alberta
- Police Outpost Provincial Park
