= Tourism in Alberta =

Tourism in the Canadian province of Alberta

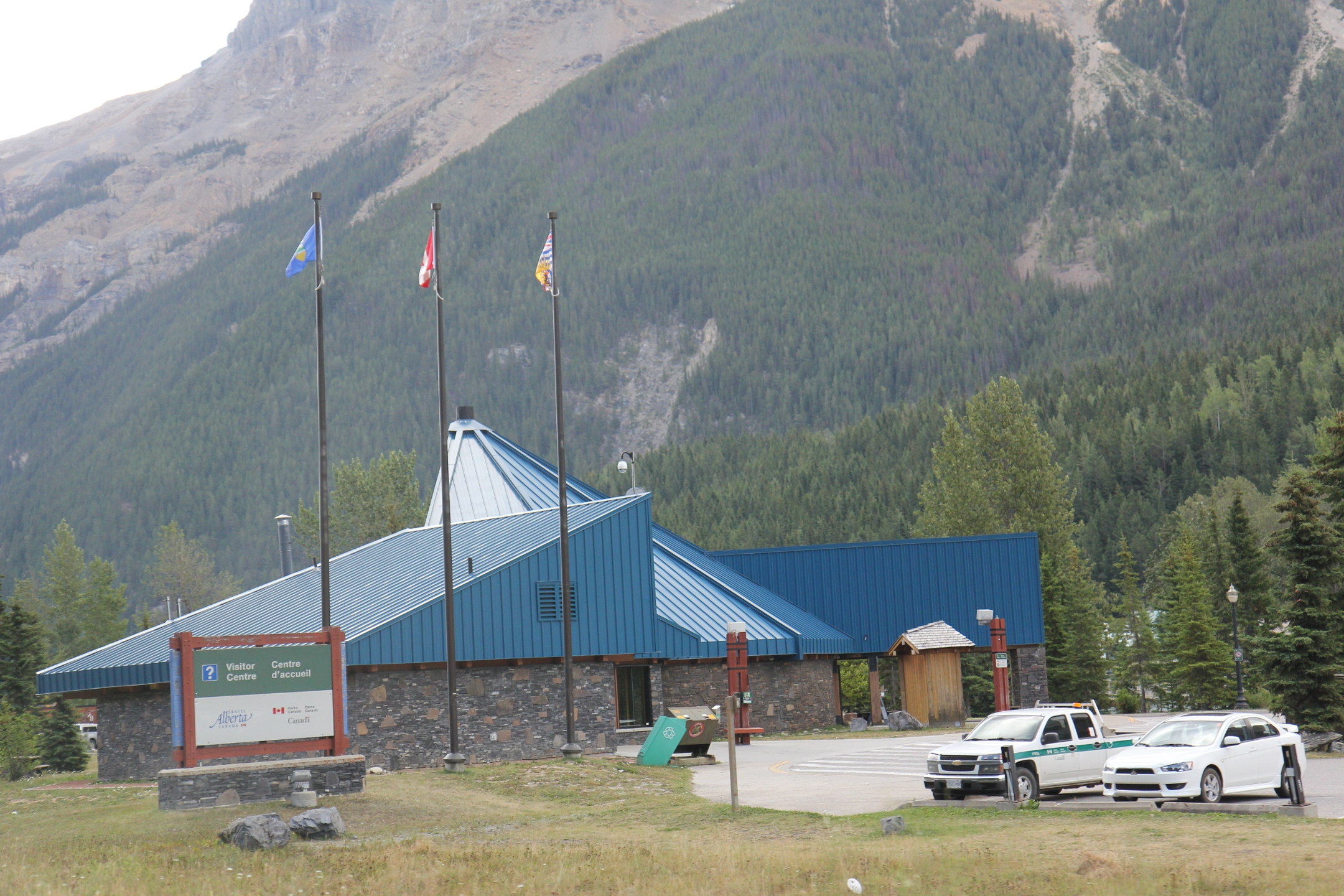
Alberta Visitor Centre

Tourism in Alberta saw 38.1 million visits that generated $14.4 billion in revenue, and supporting around 260,000 jobs in 2024. The province hosts approximately 27,900 tourism-related businesses. The number of domestic visits to the Alberta Rockies was approximately 5.5 million in 2024. This was the third-highest number of visits to the region on record and 3.8% below the all-time high set in 2021 (5.7 million visits).

The province has six UNESCO World Heritage Sites, five national parks, and numerous provincial parks. Natural landscapes like the Banff National Park and Jasper National Park, along with urban attractions such as West Edmonton Mall and the Calgary Stampede are some of the primary attractions. The province has a long-term strategy to grow tourism to $25 billion in visitor spending by 2035, supporting attractions like the Dinosaur Provincial Park and the Royal Tyrrell Museum.

== Tourist attractions ==
=== Mountains ===
The Canadian Rockies in Alberta's southwest are a major attraction for climbing and hiking, with an extensive park system and mountain peaks reaching over 3000 m. The Kananaskis Country park system has numerous trails for hiking and horseback riding, and rafting is done on some of the rivers.

=== Skiing ===
Alberta is an important destination for tourists who love to ski. It boasts several world-class ski resorts, such as Nakiska and Fortress in Kananaskis Country, Sunshine Village, Mount Norquay and Lake Louise Mountain Resort in the Banff area or Marmot Basin near Jasper. Canada Olympic Park, with its downhill ski and ski jumping facilities, is located in the city of Calgary.

=== Hunting and fishing ===
Hunters and fishermen from around the world are able to take home impressive trophies and tall tales from their experiences in Alberta's wilderness. The Bow River is famous for fly fishing and its trout population. Many of Alberta's lakes contain amenities for fishing, such as campgrounds and boat launches.

=== Museums ===
See List of museums in Alberta.

Museums in Alberta:

- The Royal Alberta Museum, in Edmonton is the official provincial museum and largest museum in western Canada.
- The Galt Museum & Archives is the primary museum in Lethbridge, and is the largest museum in the province south of Calgary.
- The Heritage Park Historical Village is a historical park located in Calgary. The park is located on 66 acres (267,000 m^{2}) of parkland on the banks of the Glenmore Reservoir, along the city's southwestern edge. It is one of the city's most visited tourist attractions.
- The Michelsen Farmstead is a typical farmstead of the 1890s era, located in the National Historic Site of Canada of Stirling. It was declared a Provincial Historic Site of Alberta in 2001, and has been restored back to its original 19th century Victorian style.
- The Royal Tyrrell Museum of Palaeontology in Drumheller is the museum that earns 5 Guinness World Records (as of November 2021) including the best-preserved armoured dinosaur in the world.

=== National and provincial parks ===
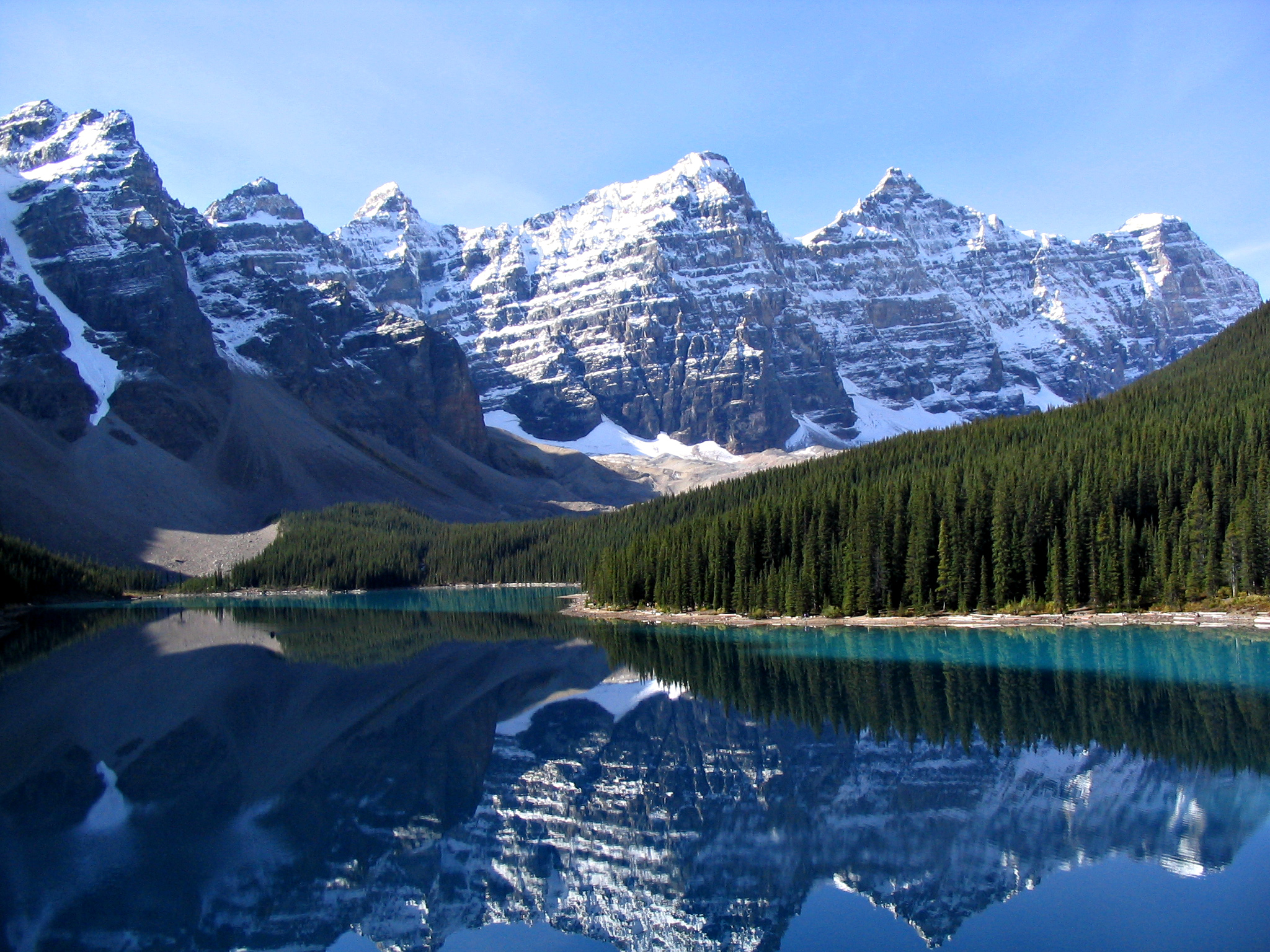
Moraine Lake, and the Valley of the Ten Peaks

Five national parks are located in the province of Alberta, with Banff, Jasper, Waterton Lakes and Elk Island National Park being the most popular tourist destinations. 69 provincial parks, 33 wildland provincial parks, 248 provincial recreation areas, 16 ecological reserves, 3 wilderness areas, 149 natural areas and a heritage rangeland are also protected on a provincial level.

Alberta contains five of Canada's 13 UNESCO World Heritage Sites. These are Canadian Rocky Mountain Parks (includes Banff and Jasper National Parks), Waterton-Glacier International Peace Park, Wood Buffalo National Park, Dinosaur Provincial Park and Head-Smashed-In Buffalo Jump.

=== Railway ===
Located in East-Central Alberta is Alberta Prairie Railway Excursions, a popular tourist attraction operated out of Stettler that draws visitors from around the world. It boasts one of the few operable steam trains in the world, offering trips through the rolling prairie scenery.

Another popular tourist attraction located near the National Historic Site of Canada of Stirling is the Galt Historic Railway Park A restored 1890 North West Territories International Train Station, the station has many Displays of life and travel in the 1880s. The station was moved from its former location in Coutts, Alberta, Canada, and Sweetgrass, Montana, USA border to the current location near Stirling in 2000.

Tourists also ride the Canadian, the Rocky Mountaineer, and the Royal Canadian Pacific, which are tourist-oriented passenger services which operate on scenic routes through the Canadian Rockies.

== Significant events in Alberta tourism ==
The history of Alberta tourism events:

- 1885: Banff National Park established, making it the first Canadian National Park, and the world's third
- 1912: The Alberta Legislature Building opens;Calgary Exhibition and Stampede debuts; Alberta's first movie theatre, the Empress Theatre, opens in Fort Macleod
- 1921: Road from Banff to Lake Louise opens
- 1923: Road from Banff to Radium opens; First competitive chuckwagon races at the Calgary Stampede
- 1927: Prince of Wales Hotel in Waterton opens 25 Jul 1927
- 1932: Waterton-Glacier International Peace Park established; Going-to-the-Sun Road opens in Waterton
- 1936: Chinook Train begins operation between Calgary and Edmonton (now on display at the Canadian Museum of Rail Travel)
- 1940: First teahouse on Sulphur Mountain opens; Icefields Parkway opens
- 1959: Sulphur Mountain Gondola opens - the first bi-cable gondola in North America and first ever gondola in Canada; First heritage trails (walking trails with posted historical information) open in Banff, including Hoodoos and Bow Summit trails
- 1962: Klondike Days begin in Edmonton, as extension of the Edmonton Exhibition, itself dating back to 1879.
- 1967: St. Paul opens a UFO landing pad to celebrate the Centennial of Confederation
- 1967: The Provincial Museum of Alberta/Edmonton opens December 6 as Alberta's project for Canada's centennial (now known as the Royal Alberta Museum).
- 1968: Calgary Tower opens June 30
- 1975: Fish Creek Park established in Calgary; Ukrainian Easter Egg "Pysanka" [10-metre-high (33 ft) statue] erected in Vegreville, commemorating the settlement of Ukrainian immigrants east of Edmonton
- 1977: Kananaskis Country opens
- 1978: Commonwealth Games held in Edmonton
- 1981: West Edmonton Mall opens, with Phase II and Fantasyland in 1983 and Phase III and the World Waterpark in 1985; Head-Smashed-In Buffalo Jump designated a World Heritage Site
- 1985: Royal Tyrrell Museum of Palaeontology opens in Drumheller; Frank Slide interpretive Centre opens April 28; Oil Sands Interpretive Centre opens in Fort McMurray
- 1986: The Mindbender at Galaxyland derails and kills three riders
- 1988: XV Olympic Winter Games held in Calgary
- 1990: Museum of the Regiments opened in Calgary, June 30
- 1991: Saamis Teepee erected in Medicine Hat; originally built for the Olympic Games in Calgary in 1988, the structure is the world's largest tepee
- 1995: Fantasyland changes its name to "Galaxyland" after a lawsuit from Disney
- 1996: Torrington Torrington Gopher Hole Museum opens
- 1997: Canadian Petroleum Interpretive Centre opens, honouring the occasion of the Leduc No. 1 oil well going into production on February 3, 1947; First leg of Trans-Canada Trail, the Bow Corridor Link Trail, opened on October 18; Town of Legal unveils first of 28 murals
- 2000: Dino 2000 opens in Drumheller as a Millennium project in August. The 8 story T-Rex sculpture incorporates a viewing platform in the head; Shaw Millennium Skate Park opens in Calgary, the world's largest public outdoor skate park.
- 2006: The Military Museums announced June 3, a reorganization of the former Museum of the Regiments, Naval Museum of Alberta, and elements of the Calgary Aerospace Museum.

== See also ==
- Tourism in Canada
- List of attractions and landmarks in Edmonton
- List of attractions and landmarks in Calgary
- List of attractions and landmarks in Stirling
- List of Alberta provincial parks
- Festivals in Alberta
