= Stirling Agricultural Village =

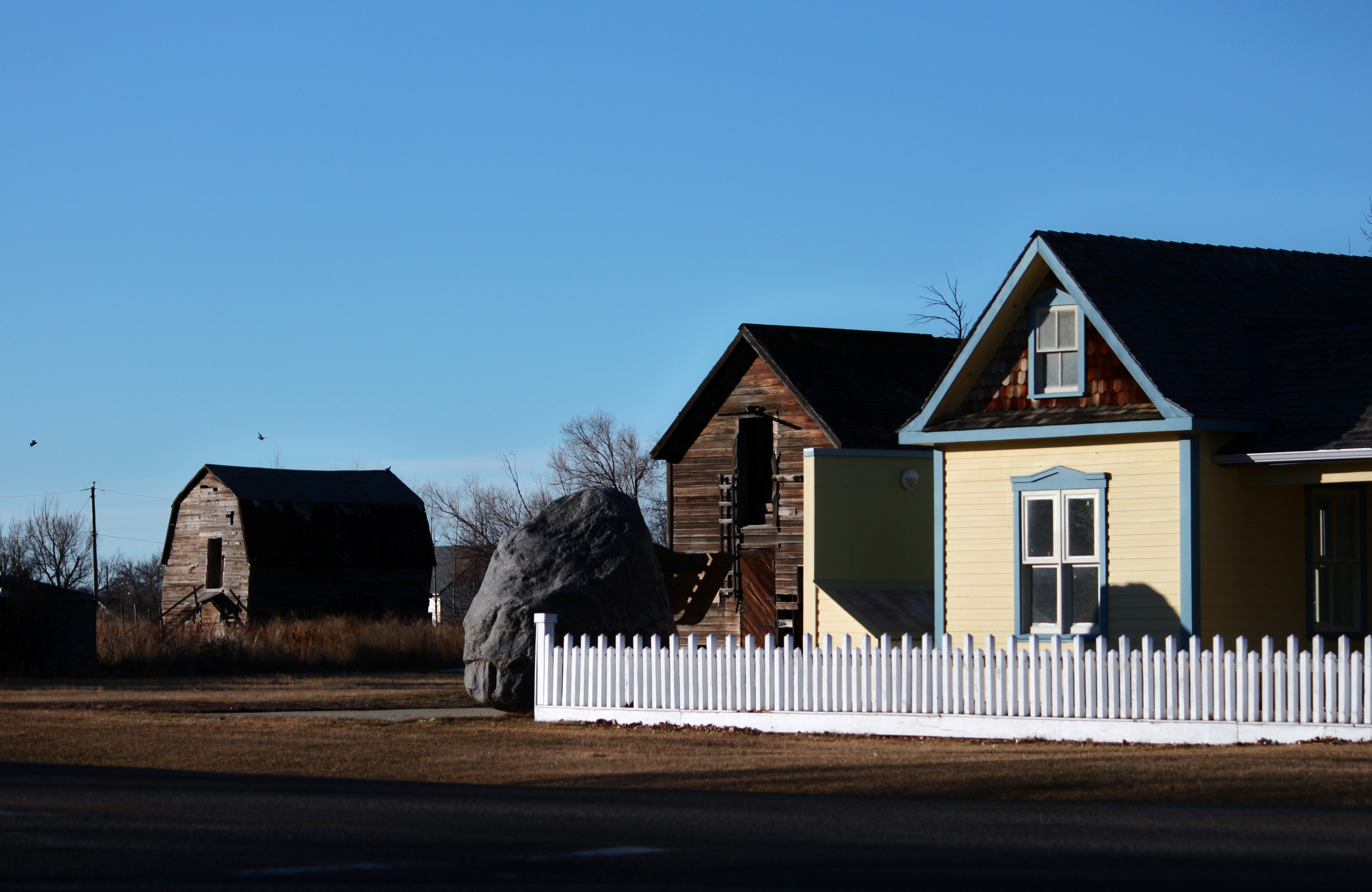
- Replica pioneer home and Bishop's Storehouse to the left
- Interactive map of Stirling Agricultural Village
- Type: Settlement
- Etymology: John A. Stirling
- Location: Village of Stirling, Alberta, Canada

History
- Established: 1899
- Founder: -Theodore Brandley -LDS Church
- Built: 1899
- Event: Stirling Settler Days

Site notes
- Elevation: 935 m (3,068 ft)
- Area: 2.64 km^{2} (1.02 sq mi)
- Architect: Theodore Brandley
- Architectural styles: -Plat of Zion -Victorian
- Governing body: Stirling - Village Council
- Website: Village of Stirling

National Historic Site of Canada
- Designated: 1997

Stirling Agricultural Village was designated as a National Historic Site of Canada on June 22, 1989. The site was designated as a national historical site of Canada because it is the best surviving example of a Mormon agricultural village. The Michelsen Farmstead was the focus of the community, and is now a totally restored museum, listed as a Provincial Historic Site in 2001. The Galt Historic Railway Park is another popular museum located in this historic site.

== History ==
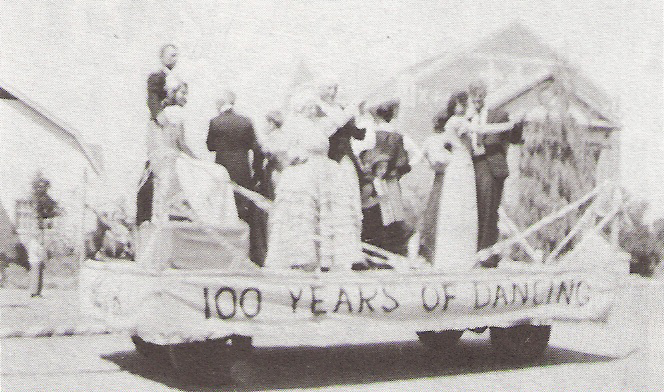
1938 Parade float celebrating Stirling Settler Days, commemorating the entry of Brigham Young and the first group of Mormon pioneers into the Salt Lake Valley on July 24, 1847. The 2nd LDS chapel in the background.

Stirling was founded on May 5, 1899, by Theodore Brandley. The village was one of two communities that owed its existence to a partnership between the Church of Jesus Christ of Latter-day Saints and Charles A. Magrath of the North Western Coal and Navigation Company. Stirling was named after John A. Stirling, managing director of The Trusts, Executors and Securities Corporation of London, which owned shares in the Alberta Coal and Railway Company.

After arriving at the Stirling siding, Theodore Brandley quickly started planning the lay-out of the village. The townsite was made up of one square mile (640 acres), then divided into lots of 10 acres (40,000 m^{2}); each with a surveyed road around the entire area with a lane running north and south, dividing it into two parcels. The parcels were then again divided, east and west, making four lots, each 2.5 acres (10,000 m^{2}), giving the residents room to build homes, barns and shelters for animals, with large gardens. Theodore planned the townsite after the Plat of Zion, which Stirling still follows today, and is recognized as the most well-preserved, Canadian example of the Plat of Zion. For this reason, Stirling is known as Stirling Agricultural Village.

== Museums and attractions ==
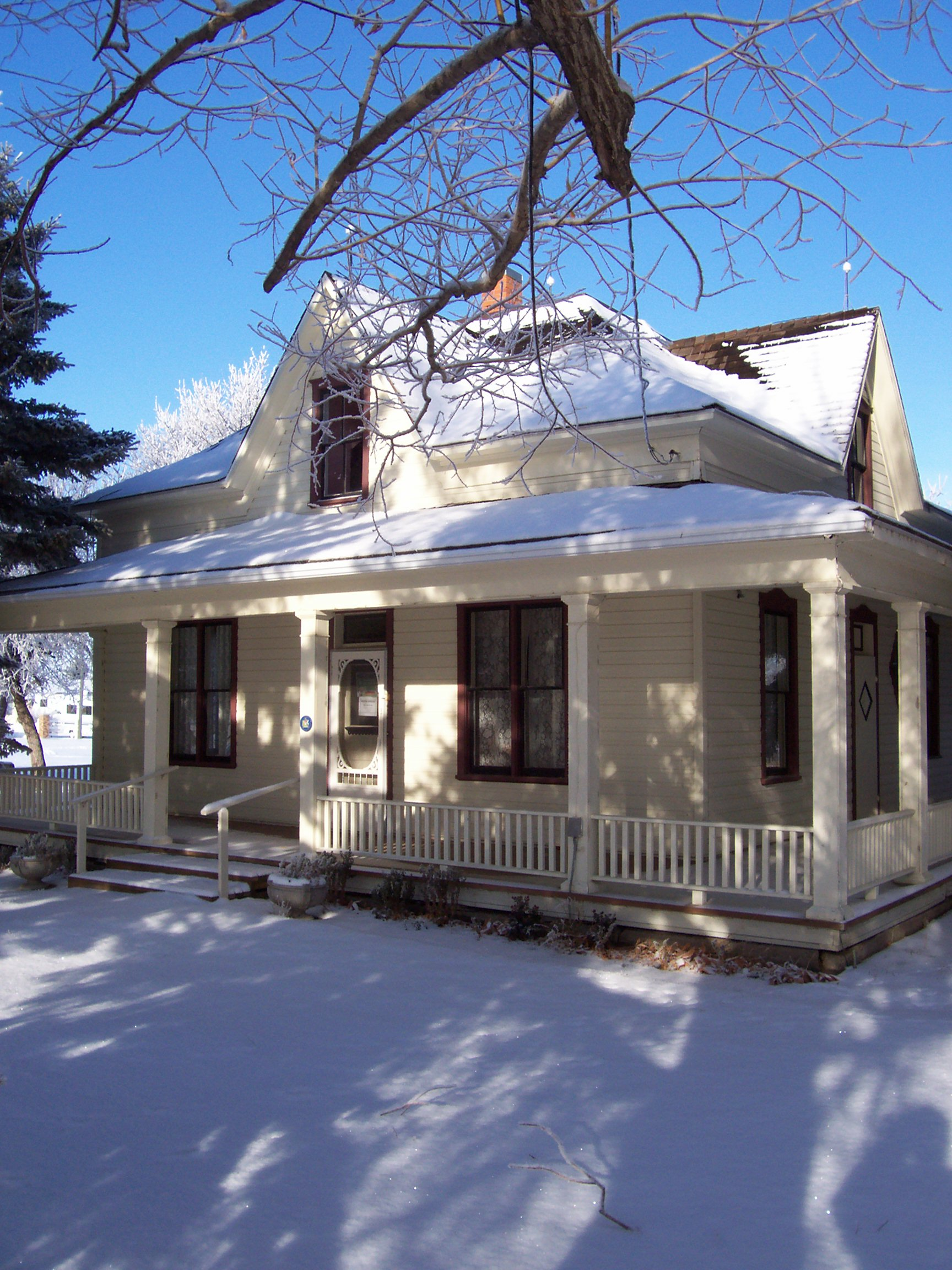
Michelsen Farmstead a Provincial Historic Site of Alberta & museum, located in the village.

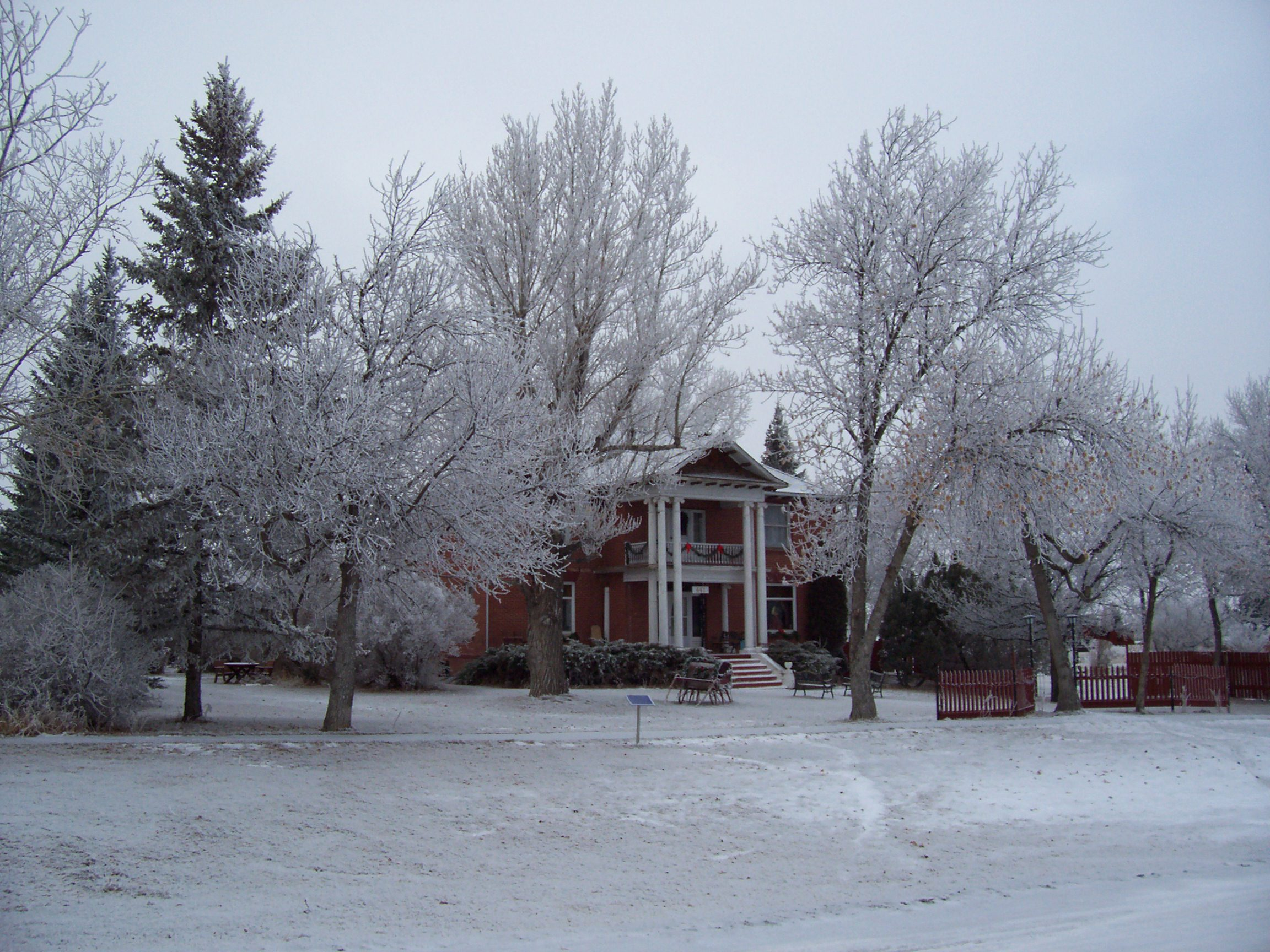
William T. Ogden House

On the east entrance of Main Street is a newly built Information Kiosk made to replicate that of an older Victorian style Pioneer home found throughout Stirling and area. In the kiosk are historical markers and a map that shows many sites of interest throughout the National Historic Site of Stirling.

=== Museums ===
- Galt Historic Railway Park - Displays of life and travel in the 1880s are set up in the restored 1890 North West Territories International Train Station from Coutts, Alberta, Canada and Sweetgrass, Montana, USA. The station was moved to the current location near Stirling, Alberta in 2000.
- Michelsen Farmstead - a typical farmstead found throughout Stirling in the early 20th century. The Michelsen's farmstead is taken care of by the Stirling Historical Society and has been completely restored back to its 1930s heritage.
- Bishop's storehouse, also known as Lord's storehouse.

=== Local attractions ===
- Stirling Lions Club Fish Pond is stocked every year with new fish for fishing.
- Prairie Cactus Mini Putts is a privately owned miniature golf course that is open by request.
- William T. Ogden House is a neo-classical style house that is declared as a Provincial Historic Site of Alberta located in Stirling. Every year around Halloween the owners of the home decorate the 7,000 sq ft (650 m^{2}) house as a live haunted house, making it the largest haunted house in southern Alberta.
- Lost Frontier Mini-Railway: The Lost Frontier Mini-Railway is a small train park open by booking from May to October and is a very popular local attraction. Located on the grounds of the William T. Ogden Home, the park also has a petting zoo.

=== Events ===
- Victoria Day at the Galt Historic Railway Park (May 24), visitors get guided tours of the Galt train station, build kites and participate in other activities.
- Stirling Community Garage Sale (Saturday of Victoria Day weekend), community garage sale held by the Stirling Historical Society.
- Lions Community BBQ (June), community BBQ held at the Stirling Lions Hall.
- Stirling Settler Days (July), After Stirling's founding on May 5, 1899, July 24, previously known as "Pioneer Day" & now called "Stirling Settler Days", was celebrated to mark the Mormon pioneers arrival in the Salt Lake Valley.
- Stirling Fall Festival (September), held at the grounds of the Michelsen Farmstead each year. Visitors get to make rope, stick dolls, and dipped candles, there are also wagon rides as well as kiddie games.
- Harvest Dance (October), also held at the Michelsens farmstead, Old-fashioned Barn dance.
- Stirling Haunted Mansion (October), located in the William Ogden House, also known as the largest haunted house in Southern Alberta.
- Victorian Prairie Christmas (November), an old-fashion Victorian Christmas party held at the Galt Historic Railway Park Station.
- Lions Christmas Dinner (November), a community dinner with traditional home cooking.
- Santa Claus Mansion (December), held at the William Ogden House in conjunction with the village's Christmas lights tour.
- Christmas Lights tour (December), held in conjunction with the Santa Claus Mansion to view citizen's Christmas light displays.

== See also ==
- List of national historic sites of Canada
- List of provincial historic sites of Alberta
- List of attractions and landmarks in Stirling
- Stirling, Alberta
