= List of tourist attractions in Stirling, Alberta =

The Village of Stirling is located in Alberta, Canada and has close to 1,000 inhabitants. Being one of only three communities in Canada that are designated National historic status, tourism is a very important part of Stirling's economy.

== Attractions and landmarks ==
The following is a list of attractions and landmarks in or near Stirling, Alberta, Canada.

	Address	Type	Remarks	Image
Andrew Larson House	5th St	Building	A local important site built by Andrew Larsen, Sr. in 1906	Larson House
A. T. Romerlil House		Heightening	Local historic site	
A. Hirsche House & Barn	3rd st	Bed and breakfast	A century old barn turned into a bed and breakfast	
Bishop's storehouse	1st st	Bishop's storehouse	Also known as Lord's storehouse	
Galt Historic Railway Park	1 km north of Stirling	Museum	Restored train station built by Sir Alexander Galt and son Elliot Galt in 1890	Galt Historic Railway Park
Ghost town of Maybutt	1 km north of Stirling	Ghost town	Former hamlet of New Stirling, now a trace town	Maybutt Buildings
Information kiosk	1st & Main St.	Kiosk	Built to give information to tourist about the sites of interest as well as historic sites throughout the town	
Centennial Park	Main St	Community Park	Consists of a swimming pool, two play grounds, a tennis court, basketball courts, campground, reunion center, a senior citizen's center, and baseball diamonds	
Galt School house		School house	Built in 1949 for the Galt School District and was the village school until 1958	
Lost Frontier Mini-Railway	441 4th st	Park	15 inch guess mini railroad which winds its way around the William T. Ogden estate, as well as a petting zoo	
Michelsen Farmstead		Museum	1890s farmstead restored back to the 1930s way of life	Larson House
Mini horses and chuckwagons	5th & 8th St	Entertainment	A farm of miniature horses	
Neils Hogenson House		Building	A home ordered from the Eatons catalogue and built in 1917 by Neil Hogensen	Hogenson House
Prairie Cactus Mini Putts		Miniature golf	Privately owned miniature golf course	
Raymond G. Hardy House	4th st S	Building	Hardy House	Hardy House
Stirling Elevator	Highway 61	Grain elevator	Tour a large grain elevator and see how they work	Stirling Elevator
Stirling Silver Saddle Club		Rodeo grounds		Stirling Silver Saddle Club
Stirling Lions Club Fish Pond		Pond	Stocked every year with new fish	
The Little Cafe/Heritage Creamery	210 4th Ave	Creamery Cafe	Produces various cream and milk products, as well as yogurts and cheeses, and other foods	The Little Cafe/Creamery
Theodore Brandley House		Building	Former home of the founder of Stirling, Theodore Brandley	Permanent home of Theodore Brandley.
William D. Barton House		Building	Local historic site	
William Hirsche House		Building	Property retains much of its original character and layout from the 1900s	
William T. Ogden House	441 4th st	Building	A historic Neo-Classical Georgian style brick mansion	Ogden House

== Events and festivals ==
The following is a list of annual events held throughout Stirling. The dates and addresses may change.

	Direct	Date	Remarks	Image
Christmas lights tour	Stirling	December	Held each December in alignment with the Santa Claus Mansion to view citizens' Christmas light displays	House decorated for the season
Stirling community garage sale		Victoria Day (May 24)	A community garage sale held by the Stirling Historical Society	
Stirling Settler Days	Main street	July 17–19	Originally celebrated to mark the Mormon pioneers' arrival in the Salt Lake Valley on 24 July 1847	
Stirling Fall Festival	Michelsen Farmstead & Centennial Park	September 13	Make rope, stick dolls, and dipped candles, wagon rides, and other fun games	
Harvest Dance	Michelsen Farmstead	October	Old-fashioned barn dance	
Haunted Mansion	441 4th st	October	The largest haunted house in Southern Alberta	
Santa Claus Mansion	441 4th st	December	Held each December in conjunction with the town's Christmas lights tour	
Lions Christmas dinner		November	Christmas dinner held at the Stirling Lions Hall	
Lions BBQ		June	Community BBQ held at the Stirling Lions Hall	

== See also ==
- Festivals in Alberta
- List of national historic sites of Canada
- List of provincial historic sites of Alberta
- Stirling Agricultural Village
- Tourism in Alberta
- Tourism in Canada
