= Neils Hogenson House =

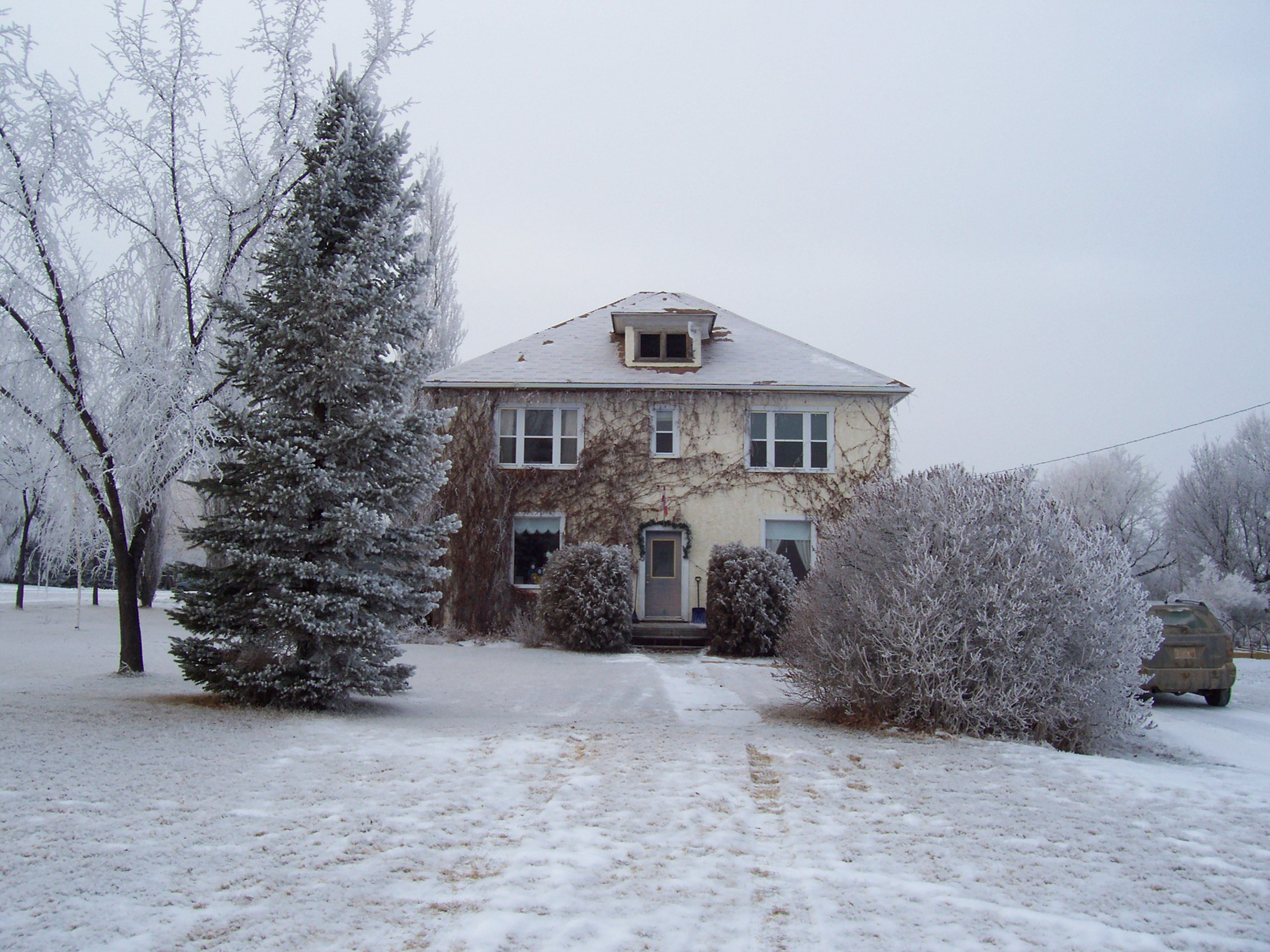
- Neils Hogenson House
- Interactive map of the Neils Hogenson House area

General information
- Architectural style: American Foursquare
- Location: Stirling, Alberta, Canada
- Coordinates: 49.502627°N 112.526822°W
- Construction started: between 1917
- Completed: between 1917
- Client: Private

Technical details
- Structural system: Wood

Design and construction
- Architect: Timothy Eaton

The Neils Hogenson home is an original catalogue order house purchased through the T. Eaton’s Co. Catalogue and built by Mr. Neils Hogensen. Shipped from Winnipeg by train, the home came to Stirling in crates with instruction, including shingles, lumber, doors, moldings, windows, paint, nails, hardware and building paper, all this for the cost of about $1,577.00. The home was paid for at the train station and hauled to the site of construction. Today the Neils Hogensen House remains on its original foundation and has become a local landmark, retaining many of the original features from the time it was constructed in 1917.

Historic interest plaque.

From the early 1900s to the 1930s, Eaton's sold entire houses from their catalogues to help with the population boom throughout Western Canada. The materials were shipped by rail to the nearest community, paid for at the station, and then hauled to the site for construction. Pricing for a home usually cost around $1,577.00 to $2,049.00 from 1917-1918. The total price depended on the extras to be added in. For $146.00 more you could add a "Hot Air Heating Plant" and for $180.00, a complete "Plumbing Outfit". The basement concrete and interior finishing were extra. This made building a home a quick and easier job for the settlers living throughout the prairies, where wood was scarce and supplies were short.

== See also ==
- Kit houses in North America
- Sears Catalog Home
- List of attractions and landmarks in Stirling
- Stirling, Alberta
