= Brandley =

Brandley may refer to:

== Given name ==
- Brandley Kuwas (born 1992), Curaçaoan footballer

== Surname ==
- April Brandley (born 1990), Australian netballer
- Clarence Brandley (1951–2018), African-American who was wrongly convicted of a rape and murder
- Theodore Brandley (1851–1928), Mormon missionary and colonizer of Stirling, Alberta, Canada
