= Kipp Coulée =

Coulée in Alberta

Geography
- Location: Alberta
- Country: Canada
- State/Province: Alberta
- District: 5-19-W4
- Coordinates: 49°26′10″N 112°28′35″W
- Interactive map of Kipp Coulée

Kipp Coulée is a valley located in Southern Alberta, Canada. It is 8 kilometres (5.0 mi) southeast of the town of Raymond and starts on the north shore of the Milk River Ridge Reservoir it then makes its way through the Village of Stirling and then it joins the Etzikom Coulee just north east of Stirling.

== See also ==
- List of coulees in Alberta
- List of lakes in Alberta
- Geography of Alberta
- Coulee
