= Stirling, Alberta =

Stirling
- Village
- Village of Stirling
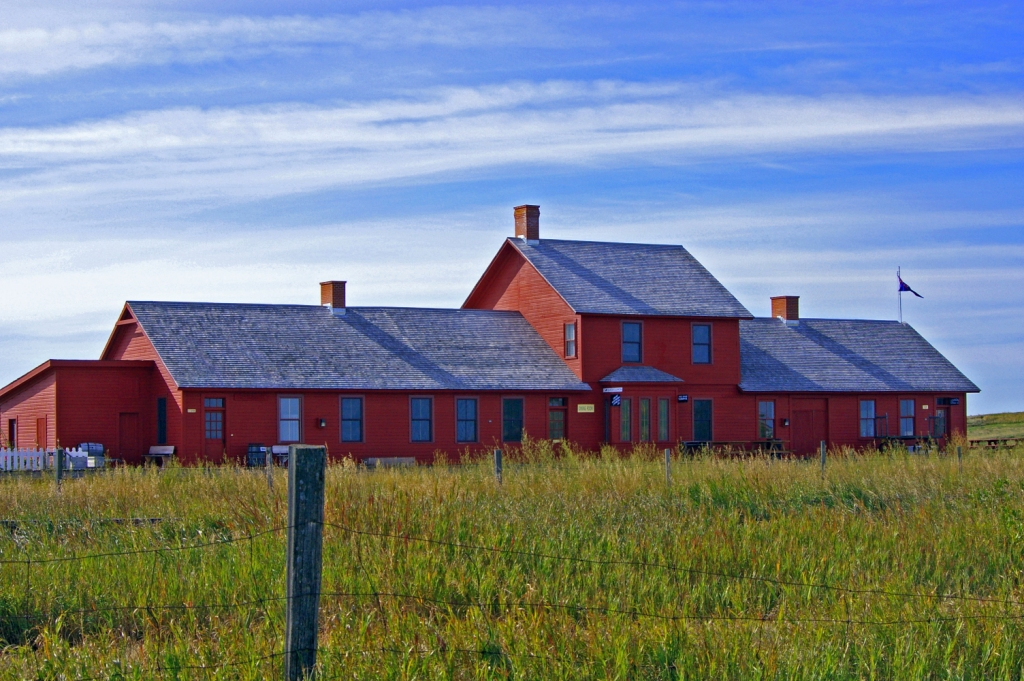
- Galt Historic Railway Park north of Stirling.

- Flag Coat of arms
- Nicknames: The Junction Town (1912); Village of Gardens; A Town of Two Towns
- Motto: Experience The History
- Location of Stirling in Alberta
- Coordinates: 49°30′08″N 112°31′00″W
- Country: Canada
- Province: Alberta
- Region: Southern Alberta
- Census division: 2
- Municipal district: County of Warner No. 5
- Founded: May 5, 1899
- Incorporated
  - Village: September 3, 1901

Government
  - Mayor: Scott Barton
  - Governing body: Stirling Village Council
  - CAO: Scott Donselaar
  - MP: Glen Motz
  - MLA: Grant Hunter

Area (2021)
  - Land: 2.7 km^{2} (1.0 sq mi)
- Elevation: 935 m (3,068 ft)

Population (2021)
  - Total: 1,164
  - Density: 431.8/km^{2} (1,118/sq mi)
- Time zone: UTC−06:00 (Alberta Time)
- Postal code span: TOK 2EO
- Area code: +1-403
- Highways: Highway 4 Highway 61; Highway 846
- Waterways: Etzikom Coulee; Kipp Coulee; Stirling Lake; Milk River Ridge Reservoir
- Historic Sites: Galt Historic Railway Park; Michelsen Farmstead; William T. Ogden House
- Website: Official website

Stirling is a village in southern Alberta, Canada that is surrounded by the County of Warner No. 5. The village is located on Highway 4, approximately 31 km (19 mi) southeast of Lethbridge and 72 km (45 mi) northwest of the Canada–US border.

The Village of Stirling is also referred to as Stirling Agricultural Village due to its designation as a National Historic Site of Canada.

== History ==
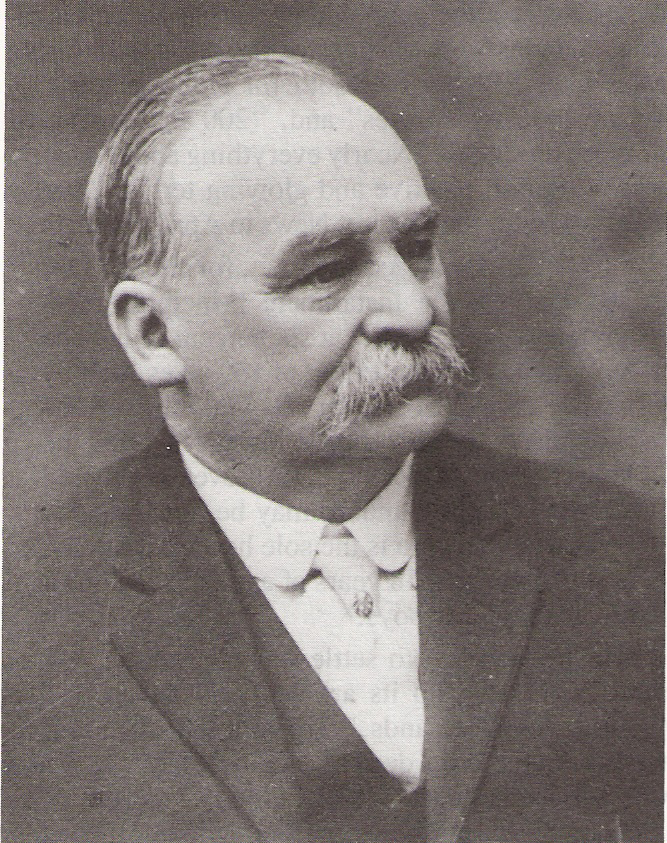
Theodore Brandley

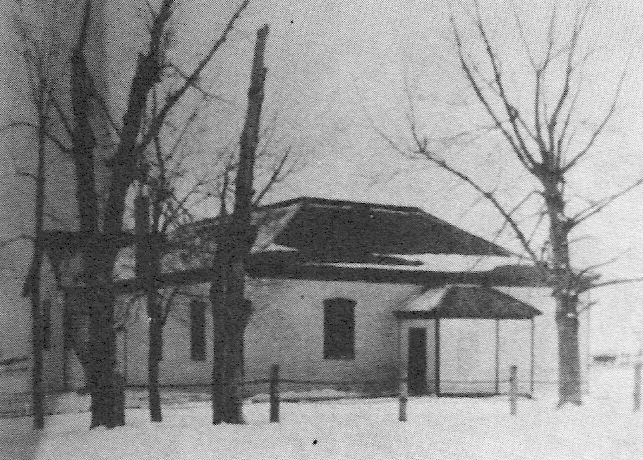
Stirling's first LDS meeting house and community hall c. 1905

As the development of Railway took place throughout the 1880s in Southern Alberta, at the time Canadian Pacific Railway (CPR) constructed a railroad from the city of Calgary to Fort Macleod. The Alberta Railway and Coal Company (ARCC) built a narrow gauge railway from Lethbridge to Medicine Hat in order to supply coal to the CPR.

In 1899, the ARCC built another narrow gauge railway from Lethbridge, Alberta to Great Falls, Montana through the Coutts-Sweetgrass border crossing, closely following the route of the old Whoop-up Trail.

Originally this railway was not built to promote colonization, but to open additional markets for Galt Coal in Montana. There was a limited amount of ranching along the route and no agricultural settlement. The ARCC opened the line to advertise land in parcels of 80-6401 acres for stock. The first station along the line south of Lethbridge was located near what was then known as "18 Mile Lake" (18 miles from Lethbridge), for locomotives to replenish water for their engines. This station siding was named after J. A. Stirling, an executive in a company in England that helped finance the ARCC. At that time, there were no people or buildings in the region, with the exception of station employees who lived in the section houses along the railway.

Alberta Railway & Coal Company owned millions of acres of semiarid dry-land throughout Southern Alberta. This land was only suitable for ranching, not many new settlers saw potential in the dry landscape.

Alberta Railway and Coal Company liked how the Church of Jesus Christ of Latter-day Saints (LDS Church) was implementing irrigation in the Salt Lake Valley, Utah and nearby Cardston, Alberta.

In 1899, it was decided to call upon the LDS Church to help colonize the area. As part of the agreement, the LDS church and the Alberta Railway & Irrigation Company (Successor to Alberta Railway & Coal Co.) was to build an irrigation canal as well, establish two communities, within the year end of 1899. The Community of Stirling and Magrath. Upon completion of the St. Mary's Irrigation Canal, the Church was granted thousands of acres of land, which was given as payment to its missionaries, who worked on building the canal.

With the arrival of irrigation on November 14, 1899, the Village of Stirling quickly developed adjacent to the ARCC and station house.

Today, the St. Mary's Main Canal is 312 km long and continues to be a vital source of irrigated water for much of Southern Alberta.

=== National Historic Site status ===
On May 5, 1899, a small band of 30 Mormon settlers led by Theodore Brandley of Richfield, Utah, arrived at Stirling station, they were greeted by Charles Ora Card of Cardston.

The day after his arrival, Brandley with the help of Card inspected and planned out the new town site of Stirling.

Like many Mormon settlements, Stirling was designed following Joseph Smith's "Plat of Zion". The village, originally made up of 47 blocks and 1 "Reserved" block, within one square mile 640 acres (2.6 km^{2}).

Each block was divided into 10 acres (40,000 m^{2}) with 8, 1.2 acres (4,900 m^{2}) lots, each measuring, 320 feet (98 m) by 160 feet (49 m). A surveyed street, 100 ft wide with irrigation canal, surrounded each block. Stirling is unique, as each block has a 20 ft wide lane or alleyway separating the blocks, giving each residence access to a back alleyway.

Also unique to Stirling is its Town Square, located at the northeast corner of the village. Originally made up of 4 "half blocks"; blocks, 1, 2, 4, 15, 17,1 8, were divided into 44, 30 feet (9.1 m) by 130 feet (40 m) commercial lots with alleyway between. Blocks 3 and 16 were divided into 25, 30 feet (9.1 m) by 130 feet (40 m) commercial lots with a 280 feet (85 m) by 260 feet (79 m) block south of block 3 and north of block 16. This block was reserved (R) for a town park or civic buildings.

The reasoning for locating the town square in the corner of the village, was because at that time this location was nearest to the original Alberta Railway & Coal Co. station. Whereas, Joseph Smith's ideal Plat of Zion, planned for the town's square or business center and civic buildings to be located at the centre of the settlement, surrounded by large residential lots, giving residents enough room for a house, barn and shelters for animals. Irrigation water was accessed at the canal running along each street, giving residence the opportunity to grow and water a large garden and raise livestock. For this reason, Stirling was known as the "Village of Gardens". These canals were used up until 1968 when the village of Stirling public works installed fresh drinking water and sewer lines to each property.

Of the 47 blocks, Stirling was laid out with 32 blocks divided into 8, 1.2 acres (4,900 m^{2}) residential lots with an alleyway separating lots 1-4 & 5–8. 13 of the 47 blocks, bordering the western and southern borders of the village, were used by residents for agriculture purposes and never divided.

Although many original Mormon Settlements throughout Southern Alberta were planned using the Plat of Zion, Stirling presently is known to be the best preserved Mormon Settlement in Canada, still following the Plat of Zion. As so, the village of Stirling has been recognized as a National Historic Site of Canada for being the best-preserved example of this layout in Canada, and designated as such on June 22, 1989.

Stirling is one of only two communities that owed its existence to a partnership between the Church of Jesus Christ of Latter-day Saints and Charles A. Magrath of the Alberta Railway & Coal Company.

=== New Stirling ===
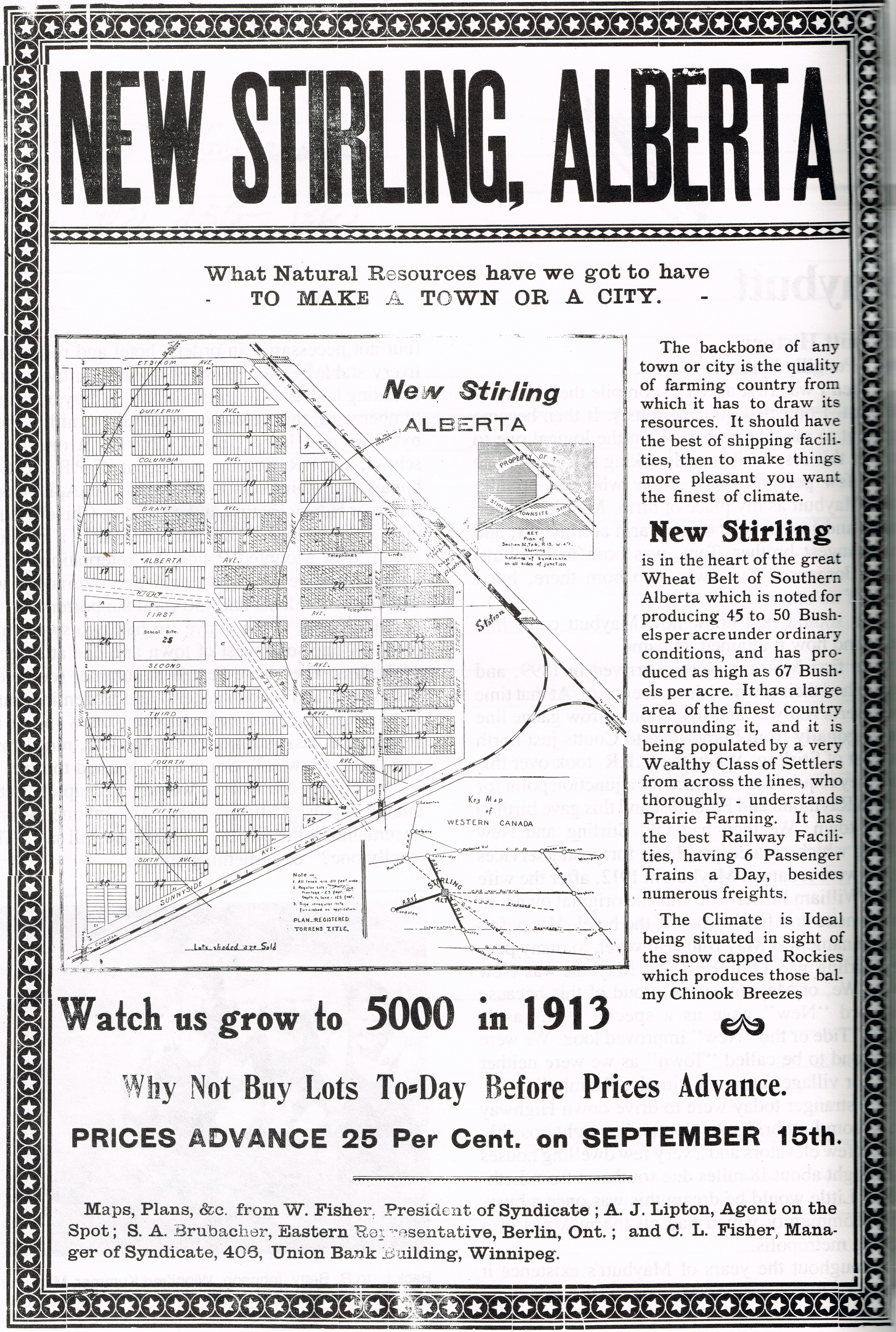
Poster advertising lots in "New Stirling"

Construction of the St. Mary Railway, beginning in Stirling and ending in Cardston began in 1900 and was finished in 1902. The Canadian Pacific Railway took over all assets of Alberta Railway and Irrigation company (successor of Alberta Railway Coal Company) in 1912 and started construction of a new line east of Stirling to Saskatchewan. Stirling had now become an important railway junction in Southern Alberta with rail lines from north, south, east and west.

To accommodate the expansion of the railway the CPR needed more space for yards and shunting. Kipp Coulee near the original station did not have enough room to expand, so the CPR moved the station one mile north. This created an ideal location for a new town. A town site was planned and lots were advertised for sale in what was called New Stirling also known as New Town. Due to confusion between the two post offices in Stirling and New Stirling, the name was changed to Maybutt. Mr. Fisher, who was the original owner and planner of the town site syndicate of Stirling, decided to rename the town after his wife, Mrs. "May Butt".

A large hotel; the Prairie Queen Hotel, a Presbyterian Church, and a large variety of other businesses and houses quickly sprung up shortly after land was opened up. The community even had its own newspaper; the "New Stirling Star". The town did not flourish and eventually, buildings were moved away; the school, that was never built was closed, before speculation of building one had failed. By the 1950s the post office closed its doors.

Maybutt slowly died off making it a forgotten ghost town with few original buildings remaining. In recent years homes have been moved into Maybutt as small hobby farms and acreages.

== Geography and climate ==
Stirling is in the County of Warner No. 5, and lies 31 km (19 mi) south-east of Lethbridge, at the junction of Highway 4 and Highway 846. The Milk River Ridge is south of the village, and Etzikom Coulee and Kipp Coulee are north of it.

Coordinates:	49°30′N 112°31′W
Elevation	935 metres (3,068 ft)
Land Area	2.64 square kilometres (1.02 sq mi)

=== Climate ===
Stirling experiences a semi-arid climate (Köppen climate classification BSk). Stirling is subject to chinooks, which bring temperatures in mid-winter above 10 °C (50 °F). Chinooks bring more than 200 days of wind a year.

Climate data for Stirling
Month	Jan	Feb	Mar	Apr	May	Jun	Jul	Aug	Sep	Oct	Nov	Dec	Year
Record high °C (°F)	16.7 (62.1)	21.8 (71.2)	23.3 (73.9)	31.1 (88.0)	34.2 (93.6)	38.3 (100.9)	39.4 (102.9)	38.9 (102.0)	36.7 (98.1)	31.7 (89.1)	22.8 (73.0)	19.6 (67.3)	39.4 (102.9)
Mean daily maximum °C (°F)	−1.8 (28.8)	1.5 (34.7)	6 (43)	12.9 (55.2)	18.2 (64.8)	22.3 (72.1)	25.5 (77.9)	25.4 (77.7)	20.1 (68.2)	14 (57)	4.3 (39.7)	−0.2 (31.6)	12.3 (54.1)
Daily mean °C (°F)	−7.8 (18.0)	−4.6 (23.7)	−0.2 (31.6)	6.0 (42.8)	11.3 (52.3)	15.5 (59.9)	18.0 (64.4)	17.7 (63.9)	12.6 (54.7)	7.0 (44.6)	−2.5 (27.5)	−6.1 (21.0)	5.7 (42.3)
Mean daily minimum °C (°F)	−13.8 (7.2)	−10.7 (12.7)	−6.5 (20.3)	−0.9 (30.4)	4.2 (39.6)	8.6 (47.5)	10.5 (50.9)	10 (50)	5.1 (41.2)	0 (32)	−7.2 (19.0)	−12 (10)	−1.1 (30.0)
Record low °C (°F)	−42.8 (−45.0)	−42.2 (−44.0)	−38 (−36)	−25.6 (−14.1)	−11.7 (10.9)	−1.7 (28.9)	0.9 (33.6)	−1 (30)	−9.4 (15.1)	−26.7 (−16.1)	−34.7 (−30.5)	−42.8 (−45.0)	−42.8 (−45.0)
Average precipitation mm (inches)	17.6 (0.69)	11.6 (0.46)	24 (0.9)	31.3 (1.23)	53.5 (2.11)	63 (2.5)	47.5 (1.87)	45.8 (1.80)	36.9 (1.45)	18.9 (0.74)	16.9 (0.67)	16.7 (0.66)	386.3 (15.21)
Source: Environment Canada

== Economy ==
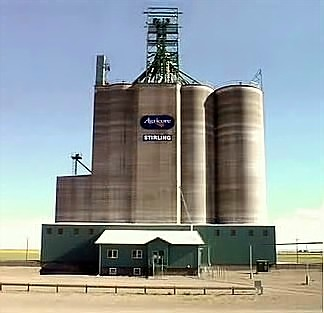
Stirling Grain Terminal (Super grain elevator)

=== Agriculture ===
Historically, Stirling's economy has relied mainly on agriculture as a main industry. The community still has strong roots to agriculture and has become one of the 21 communities that have joined the South Grow Regional Initiative, a proposal to accelerate and enhance economic development and sustainability for communities within the SouthGrow Regional Initiative region. Three quarters of a mile north east of town stands a 200 foot tall concrete terminal grain elevator. The large elevator was built between 1998 and 1999 at a cost of $11 million and was one of the first elevators of its kind in the area. The elevator was built with a capacity of 17,500 metric tonnes.

=== Other industries ===
Stirling's location and rich history makes tourism another main industry. Stirling has a variety of businesses and recreation, such as a convenience store, a wooden crib grain elevator now used as a hemp plant, a truck and tractor dealer, a pool, a community-owned campground, and a library, two museums and a community park known as Centennial Park.

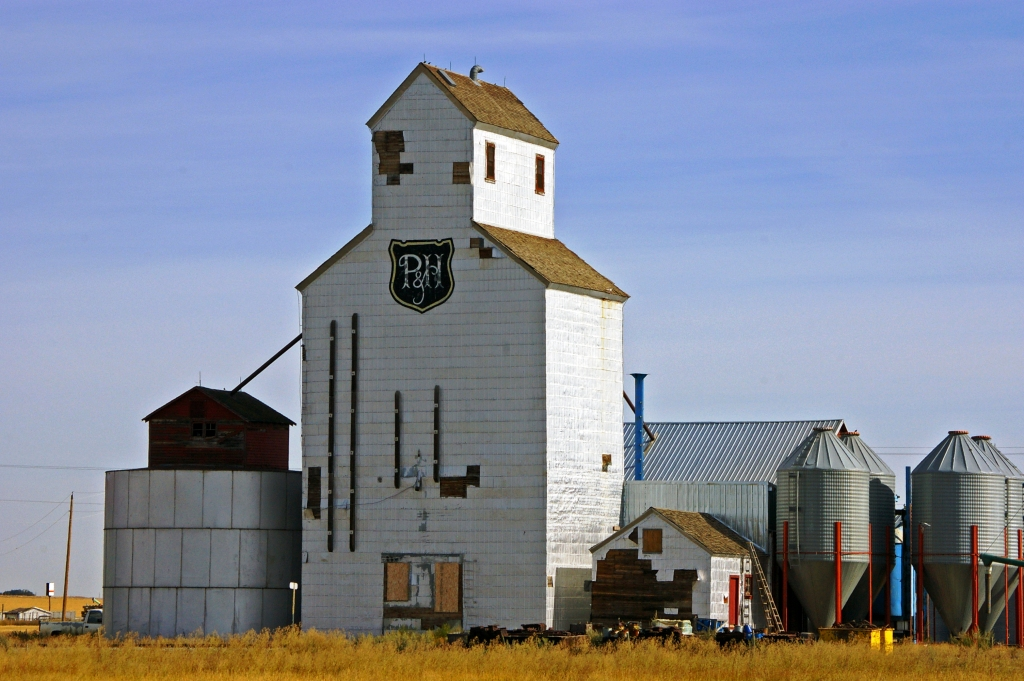
Last of three, the former P&H elevator now used as a Hemp plant.

== Demographics ==
In the 2021 Census of Population conducted by Statistics Canada, the Village of Stirling had a population of 1,164 living in 360 of its 379 total private dwellings, a change of 19% from its 2016 population of 978. With a land area of 2.7 km^{2} (1.0 sq mi), it had a population density of 431.1/km^{2} (1,116.6/sq mi) in 2021.

The population of the Village of Stirling according to its 2017 municipal census is 1,269, a change of 10.6% from its 2013 municipal census population of 1,147.

In the 2016 Census of Population conducted by Statistics Canada, the Village of Stirling recorded a population of 978 living in 308 of its 375 total private dwellings, a −10.3% change from its 2011 population of 1,090. With a land area of 2.71 km^{2} (1.05 sq mi), it had a population density of 360.9/km^{2} (934.7/sq mi) in 2016.

== Government ==
Stirling federal election results
Year	Liberal		Conservative		New Democratic		Green	
2021	4%	30	75%	535	5%	37	2%	11
2019	4%	28	88%	577	4%	25	1%	7

Stirling provincial election results
Year	United Cons.		New Democratic	
2023	74%	844	15%	176
2019	84%	521	10%	62

The village is governed by a village council composed of a mayor and four councillors, and administered by a village chief administrative officer. Municipal elections are held every four years.

== Infrastructure ==
The village is connected to two highways: Highway 4, which heads south to Interstate 15 and north to Lethbridge, and the historic Red Coat Trail also known as Highway 61, which heads east to Foremost and then ends in Manyberries.

Emergency services are provided by the nearby town of Raymond, Alberta, where the Raymond Health Centre and Royal Canadian Mounted Police (RCMP) are detached.

The village has its own volunteer fire department, which has served Stirling and area since 1957.

In recent years, village residents have reestablished the local Neighborhood watch program, an organized group of residents devoted to crime and vandalism prevention within the village.

== Tourism ==
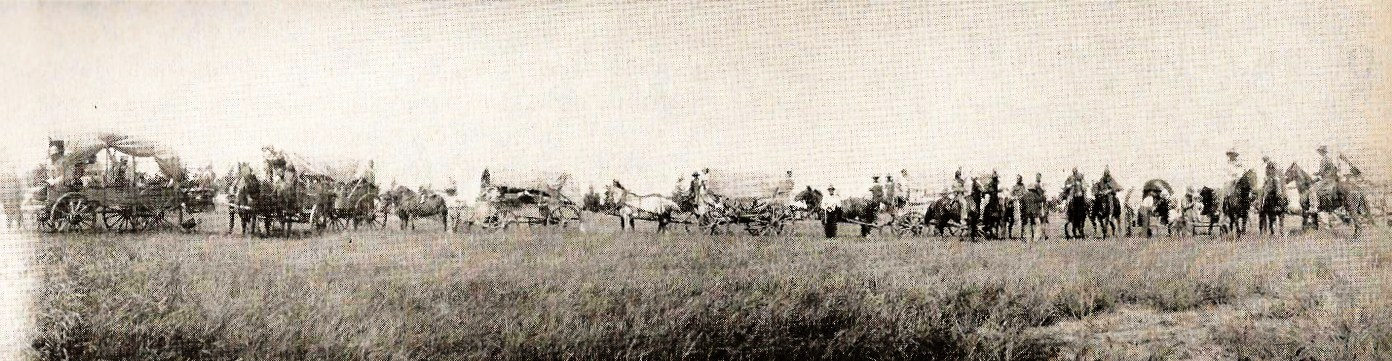
Pioneer Days Pageant, July 24, 1930, which is now known as Stirling Settler Days

Stirling's recreational facilities include ball parks, a swimming pool and water slides, a tennis court, a community centre with large picnic area, playgrounds, rodeo grounds, fish pond, cafe, Bed & breakfast, and library. The Milk River Ridge Reservoir south of Stirling supports water recreation in the summer months, and Stirling Lake also known as Michelsen Marsh, north of Stirling supports bird watchers year-round.

At the east entrance of Main Street (1 Ave & 4 St.) is a newly built information kiosk made to replicate that of an older pioneer home found throughout Stirling and area. In the kiosk are historical markers and a map that shows many sites of interest throughout the National Historic Site of Stirling.

=== Mormon Trail ===
The village of Stirling sits along the historic Red Coat Trail & Canada's Mormon Trail. A 2-4 hour self-guided tour starting in Stirling, which happens to be the first community along the trail starting at the intersection of Highway 4 and 846 and west to the town of Raymond, along Highway 52, then following Highway 5 past Magrath, all the way to Cardston.

In recent years a group was formed to unite all these communities along the Mormon Trail. Each year the communities of Stirling, Raymond, Magrath & Cardston, partner together to hold annual events such as Chautauqua, to show local talent and history of the Mormon communities along the trail.

=== Museums ===
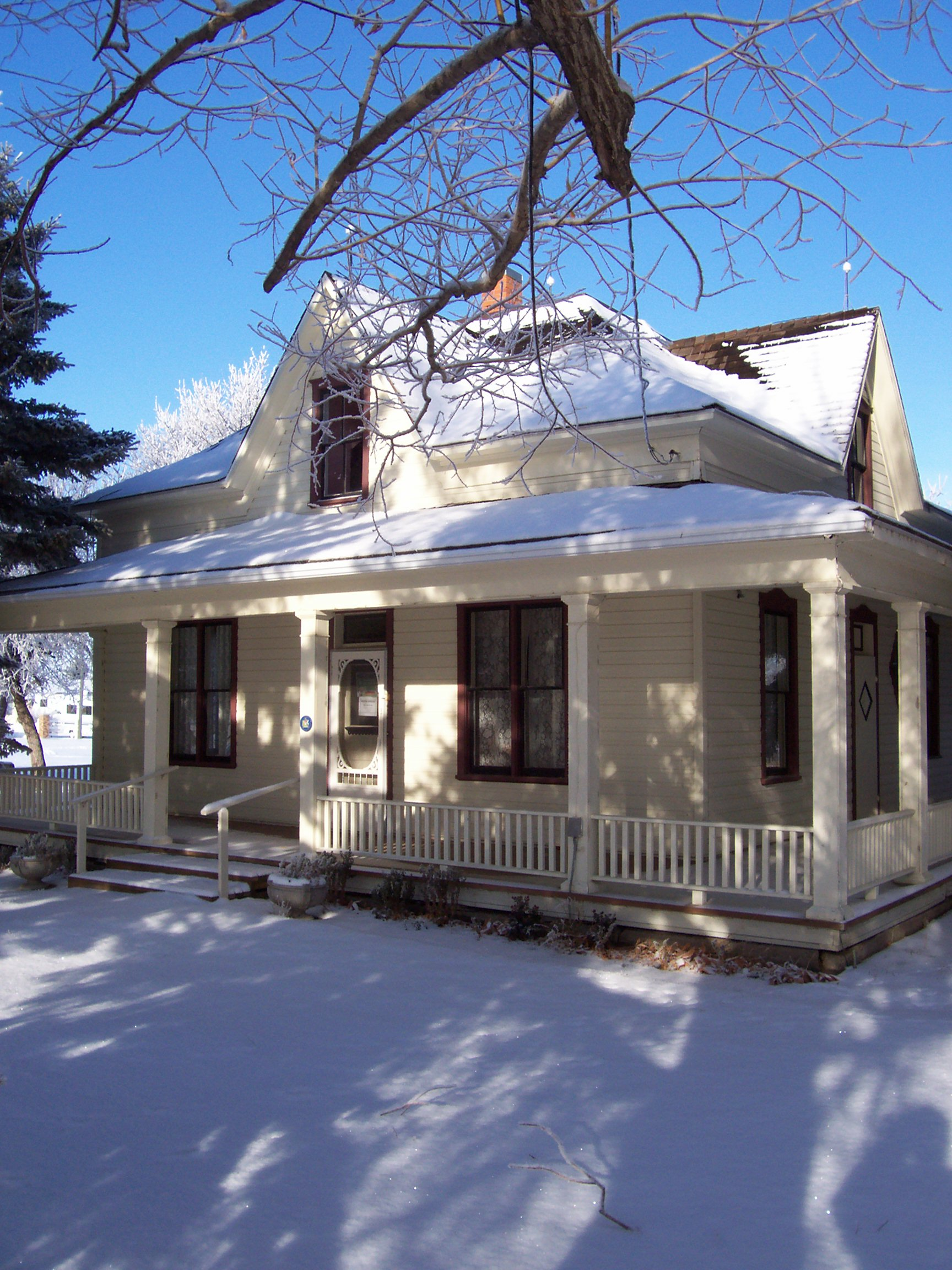
Michelsen Farmstead Provincial Historic Site of Alberta

- Michelsen Farmstead - a typical farmstead found throughout Stirling in the early 1900s. The Michelsen's farmstead was declared a Provincial Historic Site of Alberta in 2001, and is maintained by the Stirling Historical Society who have restored the farm back to its 1930s heritage. Located on the corner of 6th Street and 2nd Avenue.
- Bishop's storehouse, Also known as Lord's storehouse, moved to its current location next to the Kiosk on the corner of 1st Street and 4th Avenue.

=== Local attractions ===
- Stirling Lions Club Fish Pond, stocked every year with new fish for fishing. Corner of 7th Street and 4th Avenue.
- Centennial Park, a community park with swimming pool, playgrounds, a tennis court, basketball courts, reunion center, a senior citizen's center, baseball diamonds and campground.
- William T. Ogden House, a Neo-Classical style house that is declared as a Provincial historic site of Alberta located in Stirling. Every year around Halloween the owners of the home decorate the 7,000 sq ft (650 m^{2}) house as a live haunted house, making it the largest haunted house in southern Alberta. 441 4th Street.
- Lost Frontier Mini-Railway, a small train park open by booking from May to October and is a very popular local attraction. Located on the grounds of the William T. Ogden House, the park also has a petting zoo, a mini village, a large Cuckoo clock as well as the "worlds smallest church". 441 4th Street.

One of Stirling's decorative banners

=== Events ===
- Stirling Community Garage Sale (Saturday of Victoria Day weekend), community garage sale held by the Stirling Historical Society.
- Lions Community BBQ (June), community BBQ held at the Stirling Lions Hall.
- Stirling Settler Days (July), after Stirling's founding on May 5, 1899, the 24th of July, previously known as "Pioneer Day" & now called "Stirling Settler Days", was celebrated to mark the Mormon pioneers' arrival in the Salt Lake Valley.
- Stirling Fall Festival (September), held at the grounds of the Michelsen Farmstead each year. Visitors get to make rope, stick dolls, and dipped candles, there are also wagon rides as well as kiddie games.
- Harvest Dance (October), also held at the Michelsens farmstead, Old-fashioned Barn dance.
- Lions Christmas Dinner (November), a community dinner with traditional home cooking.
- A Victorian Christmas (December), a dinner and show at the Galt Historic Railway Park.
- Santa Claus Mansion (December), held at the William Ogden House in conjunction with the town's Christmas lights tour.
- Christmas Lights tour (December), held in conjunction with the Santa Claus Mansion to view citizen's Christmas light displays.

=== Regional attractions ===
Devil's Coulee Dinosaur Heritage Museum

The Devil's Coulee Dinosaur Heritage Museum features a Hadrosaur (duck-billed dinosaur) nest and embryo, ancient fossils, dinosaur models, located in the Village of Warner.

Galt Historic Railway Park

The Galt Historic Railway Park located 1 km north of Stirling is another popular museum which displays the life and travel of the late 1880s to early 1920s in the restored 1890 North-West Territories International Train Station from Coutts, Alberta, Canada, and Sweetgrass, Montana, USA. The station was moved to the current location near Stirling in 2000 and is added onto every year.

Waterton Lakes National Park

Waterton Lakes National Park is a national park located in the extreme southwest corner of Alberta, Canada, 40 km west of Cardston, and borders Glacier National Park in Montana, USA. Waterton Lakes was Canada's fourth national park formed in 1895. The Rocky Mountains rise suddenly out of the rolling prairies in the park. Amid the peaks are the three Waterton Lakes, carved out of the rock by ancient glaciers.

Writing-on-Stone Provincial Park

Writing-on-Stone Provincial Park, 44 km east of Milk River, is one of the largest areas of protected prairie in the Alberta park system, and serves as both a nature preserve and protection for the largest concentration of rock art, created by Plains People. There are over 50 rock art sites, with thousands of figures, as well as numerous archeological sites.

== Education ==
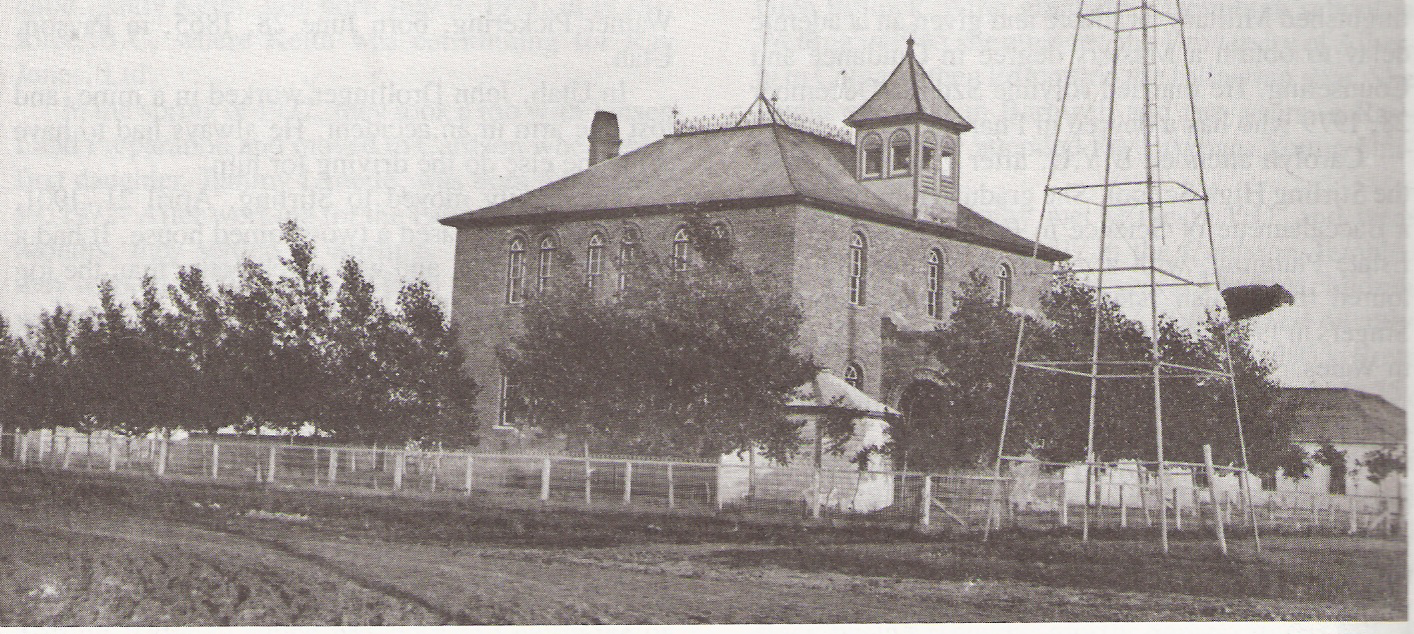
Stirling School 1902, demolished 1957

Stirling has one school that covers Kindergarten through grade 12 in the Westwind School Division. Enrollment for Stirling School was 322 in 2006.

Stirling School is home to a few athletic teams, from volleyball to badminton, even golf.

== Sports ==
In 1924, rodeo pioneer and Stirling cowboy Earl W. Bascom designed and made rodeo's first one-hand bareback rigging, which is now standard rodeo equipment used around the world, making Stirling the "Home of the Modern Rodeo Bareback Rigging." Earl Bascom is considered the world's greatest inventor of rodeo equipment and has been called the "Father of Modern Rodeo."

The high school girls basketball team, the Lakettes, won the 1A girls basketball provincial championships in 1997–1999. They placed in three other provincial championships between 1996 and 2006, and won or placed second for 6 straight years between 1996 and 2003.

The high school boys basketball team, the Lakers, won the 1A boys basketball provincial championships in 2001, 2003, 2006, 2007 and 2008. They placed second in three other provincial championships between 1996 and 2006, and have played in 6 of the last 10 championships.

In 2006 the final game was a decisive 98–68 victory over the third-ranked Youngstown Falcons. Besides the provincial title, the Stirling Lakers recorded a season of 30 wins, 9 losses, and 3 other tournament champion titles, including the 1A South Zone Title, the Picture Butte Sugar King Invitational, and the Mccoy Invitational.

The Stirling Lakers followed up their 2006 season with another provincial title in 2007.

The Lakers were victorious in the championship game over their rivals from Foremost.

On their way to provincials, the Lakers were also crowned South Zone champions.

In 2008 Stirling hosted provincials and ended up winning their third provincial title in a row.

== Media ==
Stirling is served by a number of regional newspapers including the Westwind Weekly, Lethbridge Herald, and Prairie Post. At one time, Stirling had a newspaper of its own called the Stirling Star.

Newspapers

- Lethbridge Herald
- Prairie Post, a newspaper focused on Alberta and the southwest region of Saskatchewan.
- Stirling Star was Stirling's newspaper printed in New Stirling until the late 1930s.
- Westwind Weekly, a weekly newspaper featuring news from Stirling and surrounding communities.

Movies

- Pure Escape, movie shot throughout southern Alberta and Stirling in the 1980s.
- The Calgary Stampede, movie filmed in 1925, starring Hoot Gibson. Gibson rode a team of palomino horses in a Roman standing race filmed at the Calgary Stampede. The palomino horses were from the Bascom Ranch of Stirling.
- RV, movie filmed in the Vancouver area and southern Alberta including the Stirling area, May–December 2005, starring Robin Williams, Cheryl Hines, Joanna Levesque, Josh Hutcherson, Jeff Daniels, and Kristin Chenoweth.

== Notable people ==
- Earl W. Bascom (1906-1995) - moved to Stirling in 1924, rodeo pioneer, inventor of modern rodeo bareback rigging, inductee of cowboy halls of fame, "father of modern rodeo," Hollywood actor, western artist and sculptor
- Theodore Brandley - LDS missionary and colonizer of Stirling
- Reg Kesler - Calgary Stampede champion and inductee of the Canadian Professional Rodeo Hall of Fame
- Jim Hillyer (1974–2016) - Member of Parliament

== See also ==
- List of attractions and landmarks in Stirling, Alberta
- List of communities in Alberta
- List of national historic sites of Canada
- List of provincial historic sites of Alberta
- List of villages in Alberta
- Scottish place names in Canada
