= William T. Ogden House =

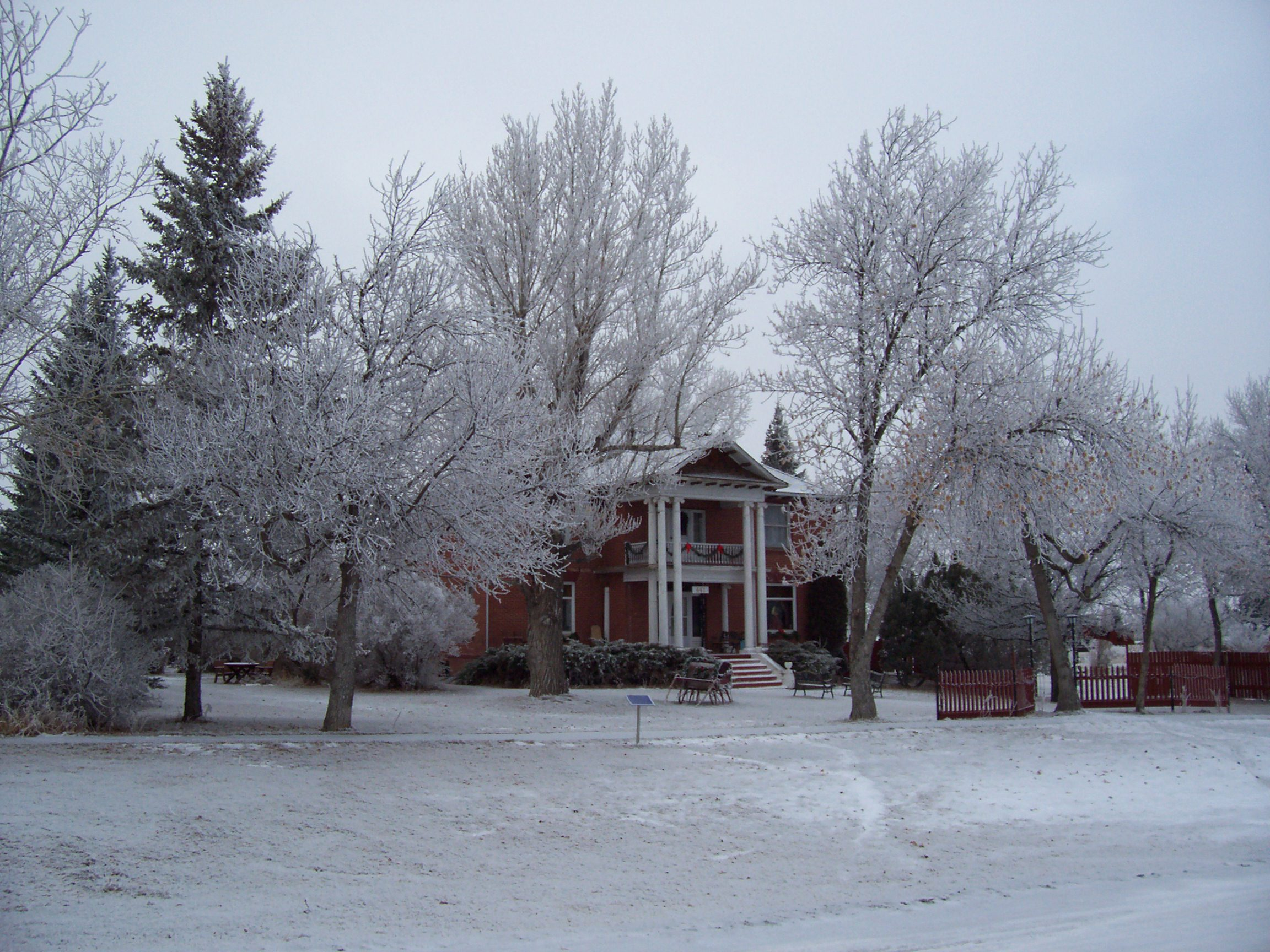
- William T. Ogden House
- Interactive map of the William T. Ogden House area

General information
- Architectural style: Neo-Classical
- Location: Stirling, Alberta, Canada
- Coordinates: 49.500575°N 112.526826°W
- Construction started: between 1910-1919
- Completed: between 1909-1913
- Demolished: Historic Building
- Client: Private

Technical details
- Structural system: Brick

Design and construction
- Architects: William T. Ogden & Bent Rolfson

William T. Ogden House is a historic Neo-Classical Georgian style brick mansion located on 3 acres (12,000 m^{2}) in Stirling, Alberta, Canada. Construction of the house began in 1910 and was finished in 1919 by William T. Ogden. The house has been a rooming house, pool hall and a dance studio, and in 1934 it became a temporary school for grades 1 through 4 due after the local school was affected by fire. This home is actually mentioned in village records as thought to be haunted as far back as the 1950s. Every Halloween, the owners conduct Stirling Haunted Mansion tours, making it the largest haunted house in Southern Alberta. The Santa Claus Mansion event is held there each December in conjunction with a Christmas lights tour. A 16-inch (410 mm) gauge mini railroad, the Lost Frontier Mini-Railway, winds its way around the estate.

== History ==
William T. Ogden was another of the first to come to Canada to settle, he arrived in 1899. This house was the second to be built. His first house was smaller than the one that stands today.

The house was extremely well built, costing $15,000. The walls are about twelve inches thick and consist of two layers with a space the width of a brick between them to provide insulation. Foundation walls are even thicker to prevent seepage of water into the basement when flood irrigation was taking place around the house. The house had many conveniences not enjoyed by other homes in the community. It was lit by electricity, powered by twelve batteries, which were recharged by a motor, it was centrally heated by radiators and a coal-fired furnace, and had hot and cold running water which was pumped from a very large cistern beside the house into a storage tank in the basement. The rooms were large and spacious, the ceilings 10' high, a wide staircase led to a large hall on the upper floor, with seven rooms leading off of it. The house was and still is a dominant landmark in the community.

While the house retains much of its integrity, particularly the exterior, the same cannot be said for the site upon which it sits. It is a large house that did not, and still does not, conform with the community in which it is located. For this reason, it is a distinctive landmark that impresses locals and visitors alike and raises many questions as to the reason for its construction.

William T. Ogden was one of the Mormon pioneers who arrived in Southern Alberta in 1899 to help build the St. Mary River Irrigation Canal. He designed the house himself, based on his memories of the architecture of the southern states where he served his mission and met his first wife. Together with an architect friend, Bent Rolfson, of Raymond, they drew up the plans, and with only "day labour" help built the house over a period of years, completing it in 1919. Ogden was a prominent member of the Stirling community. After his death in 1930, the house gradually fell into disrepair. It was used for classes for Grades 1 to 4 while the Stirling School was being reconstructed after a fire. It was used a pool hall, became an apartment house, and then a rooming house for "displaced persons" following World War II. Over the past thirty years it has been owned by individuals who have endeavoured to restore it.

== See also ==
- List of attractions and landmarks in Stirling, Alberta
- Stirling, Alberta
