= Westwind School Division No. 74 =

School district in Alberta, Canada

Location
- 445 Main Street; Cardston, Alberta, Canada Cardston; Glenwood; Hill Spring; Magrath; Mountain View; Raymond; Stirling Canada
- Coordinates: 49°11′47″N 113°18′9″W

District information
- Superintendent: Darren Mazutinec
- Chair of the board: Jim Ralph
- Schools: 12 (Regular); 1 (Alternate); 18 (Hutterite Colony)
- Budget: CA$36.7 million (2007/2008)

Students and staff
- Students: 4,006 (September 2006)

Other information
- Elected trustees: Anna Joyce-Frank, Blood Reserve; Tami Tolley, Cardston & district Colin Paterson, Cardston & district Ross Blackmer, Magrath & district Doug Smith, Mountain View, Hillspring, & Glenwood; Jim Ralph, Raymond & district Ross Blackmer, Raymond & district Josh Smith, Stirling; Jessica Payne, Welling, Magrath & District
- Website: www.westwind.ab.ca

Westwind School Division is a public school authority serving the County of Warner No. 5 and Cardston County.

== Schools ==
Cardston

- Cardston Elementary School (K-5)
- Cardston Jr. High School (6-8)
- Cardston High School (9-12)

Glenwood

- Spring Glen Elementary School (K-5)

Hill Spring

- Spring Glen Junior High School (6-9)

Magrath

- Magrath Elementary School (K-6)
- Magrath Jr./Sr. High School (7-12)

Mountain View

- Mountain View School (K-9)

Raymond

- Raymond Elementary School (K-6)
- Raymond Jr. High School (7-9)
- Raymond High School (10-12)

Stirling

- Stirling School (K-12)

Westwind Alternate School

Westwind Colony Schools

== See also ==
- List of Alberta school boards
