= Stirling School =

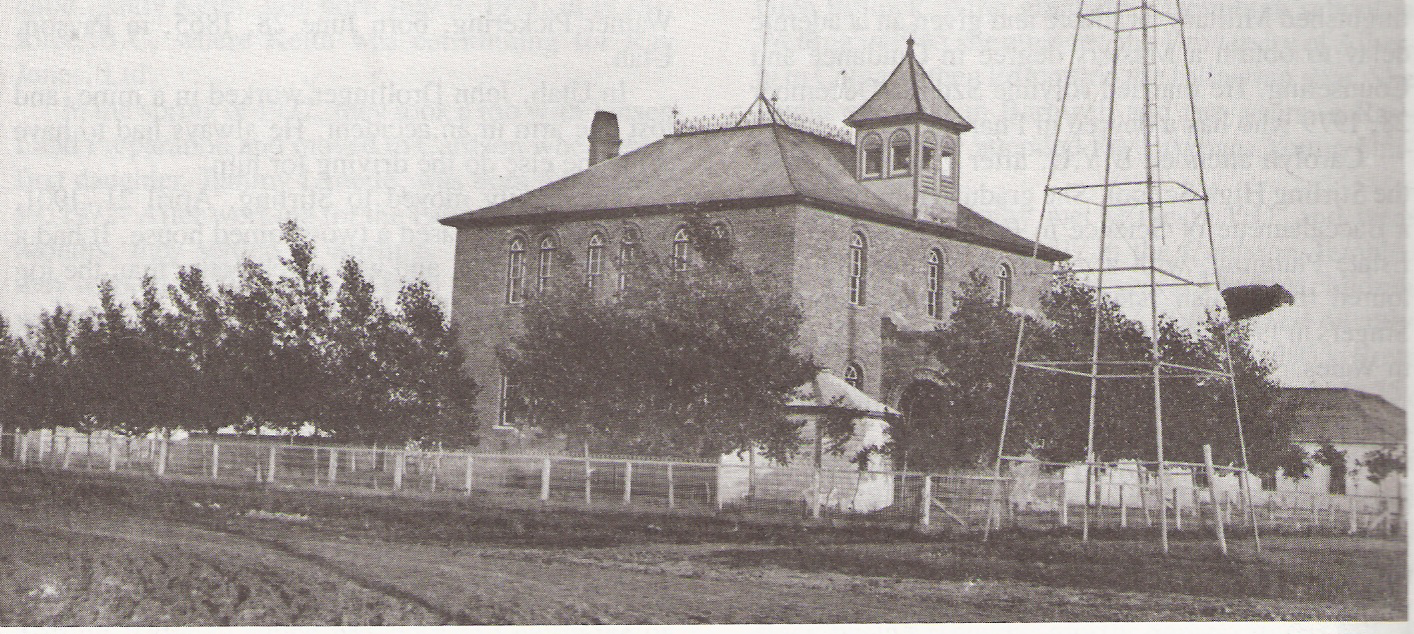

Location
- 426 3d Street; Stirling, Alberta, T0K 2E0; Canada; 49.50134°N 112.52235°W

Information
- School type: Public school
- Founded: 1901
- Authority: Westwind School Division No. 74
- Superintendent: Kent Summerfield
- Area trustee: Josh Smith
- Principal: Ingeborg Pot
- Grades: K-12
- Enrollment: 354 (September 2015)
- Language: English
- Colours: Red, White, and Blue
- Team name: Lakers
- Website: www.stirlingschool.ca

Stirling School, is a public school that covers kindergarten through high school (K-12) located in Stirling, Alberta, Canada in the Westwind School Division No. 74.

== History ==
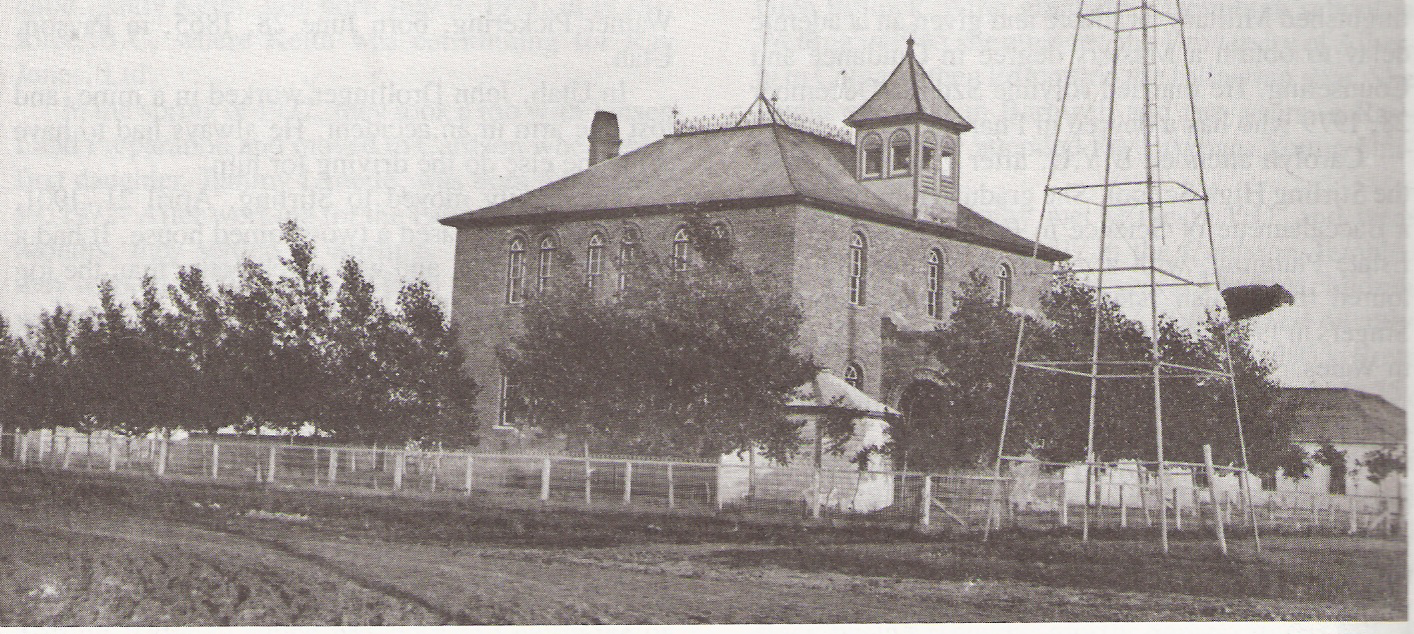
Stirling School 1902, demolished 1957

Prior to 1902 school was held in the L.D.S Church next to the school grounds. In 1901 plans were drawn up to create the Galt School District No. 647. In 1902 a large two story brick school house was built made completely out of bricks baked from Kipp Coulee creek in Stirling. On a cold day in 1934 the top floor was claimed by fire. It was said to be caused by a chimney fire. For the duration of the renovations students were sent to the Ogden House at 441-4th street until the second floor was rebuilt. In the early 1950s the original brick building became to small for the growing student population and was then condemned and replaced in 1957 with a modern building sitting on the original location of the first L.D.S. Church.

== Athletics ==
Stirling School is home to a few athletic teams, from volleyball to badminton, even golf, but is known for its undefeated Stirling Lakers. It holds membership in the Alberta Schools Athletic Association, and competes in its events.

=== Basketball ===
The high school girls basketball team won the 1A girls basketball provincial championships in 1997–1999. They placed in three other provincial championships between 1996 and 2015. The Lakettes won or placed second for 6 straight years between 1996 and 2003.

The high school boys basketball team won the 1A boys basketball provincial championships in 2001, 2003, and 2015. They placed second in three other provincial championships between 1996 and 2006. The Lakers have played in 6 of the last 10 championships.

In 2006 the final game was a decisive 98–68 victory over the third-ranked Youngstown Falcons. Besides the provincial title, the Stirling Lakers recorded a season of 30 wins, 9 losses, and 3 other tournament champion titles, including the 1A South Zone Title, the Picture Butte Sugar King Invitational, and the Mccoy Invitational. The Stirling Lakers followed up their 2006 season with another provincial title in 2007. The Lakers were victorious in the championship game over their rivals from Foremost. On their way to provincials, the Lakers were also crowned South Zone champions.

== See also ==
- List of Alberta school boards
- Stirling, Alberta
