= Theodore Brandley =

Swiss Mormon missionary (1851–1928)

Johann Theodore Brandley
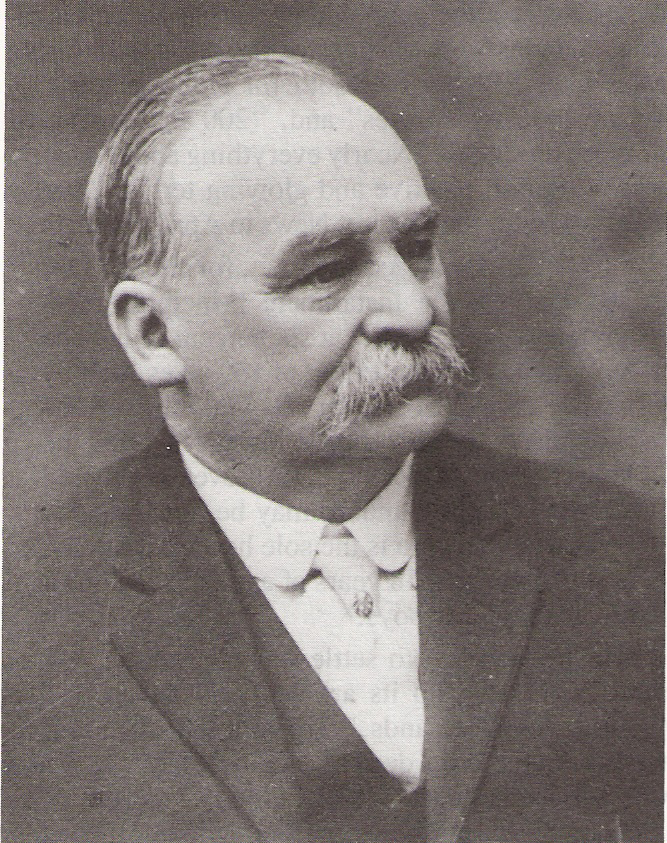
- Johann Theodore Brandley
- Born: December 7, 1851; Horgen, Zürich canton, Switzerland
- Died: May 6, 1928 (aged 76)
- Occupation(s): Missionary, colonizer, LDS Church leader, and mayor of both Richfield, Utah, United States, and Stirling, Alberta, Canada

Johann Theodore Brandley (December 7, 1851 – May 6, 1928) was a Mormon missionary and colonizer of the agricultural village of Stirling, Alberta, Canada.

Brandley was born in Horgen, Zürich canton, Switzerland. A convert to the Church of Jesus Christ of Latter-day Saints (LDS Church), Brandley was one of the first LDS Church missionaries called to Canada from his former home in Richfield, Utah Territory. Brandley was asked by the LDS Church to help colonize Stirling, Alberta. He also served three missions for the LDS Church to the Swiss and German Missions of the church and one to the northern United States and Manitoba.

In order to move to Canada, Brandley resigned from his positions as the mayor of Richfield and as the LDS Church bishop and patriarch of Richfield; he also sold his furniture store. With him on his mission to help colonize Western Canada were, his wife Eliza Zaugg, his children; Henry, Joseph, Albert, Theodore Jr., and his only daughter Anna, followed by 8 other families, also from Utah. Arriving at Stirling siding, (known then as 18 Mile Lake) on May 5, 1899, Brandley and company were greeted by Charles Ora Card of Cardston.

The day after his arrival, Card and Brandley inspected and planned out the new town site of Stirling.

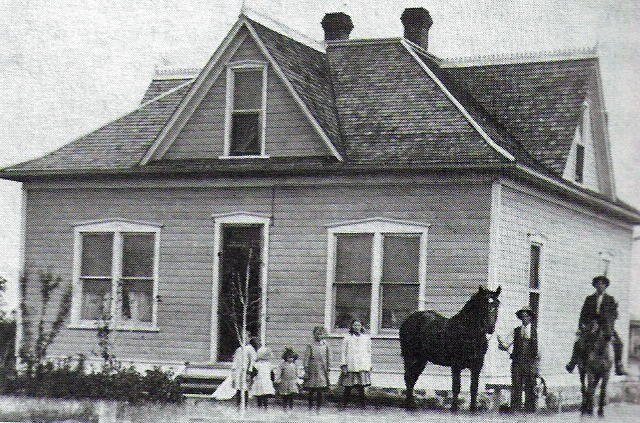
Permanent home of Theodore Brandley, Stirling, Alberta

Stirling was designed following Joseph Smith's "Plat of Zion". The village was originally made up of 47 blocks and 1 "Reserved" block, one square mile 640 acres (2.6 km^{2}). Each block was made up of 10 acres (40,000 m^{2}) with 8, 1.2 acres (4,900 m^{2}) lots. A surveyed street, 100 ft wide, surrounded each block. Stirling is unique, as each block has a 20 ft wide lane or alleyway separating the blocks into 2 parcels of 4, 1.2 acres (4,900 m^{2}) lots on each side.

Also unique to Stirling is its "Town Square", located at the Northeast corner of the village, made up of 4 "half blocks" & a smaller block Reserved for a town park or civic buildings. Brandley's reasoning for locating the town square in the corner of the village, was because at the time this location was nearest to the original Galt railway station. Whereas, Joseph Smith's ideal Plat of Zion, planned for the town's square or business center and civic buildings to be located at the centre of the settlement, surrounded by large lots, giving residents enough room for a house, barn and shelters for animals, as well a large garden, with irrigation water accessed at the canal running along each street.

Of the 47 blocks, Stirling was designed with 32 blocks divided into 8, 1.2 acres (4,900 m^{2}) lots with alleyway. 13 of the 47 blocks, bordering the Western and Southern borders of the village, were used by residents for agriculture purposes and never divided.

Although many original Mormon Settlements throughout Southern Alberta were planned using the Plat of Zion, Stirling presently is known to be the best preserved Mormon Settlement in Canada, still following the Plat of Zion. As so, the village of Stirling has been recognized as a National Historic Site of Canada for being the best preserved example of this layout in Canada.

Brandley practiced polygamy and had four wives, as was common for members of the LDS Church at the time.
