= List of ski areas and resorts in Alberta =

This is a list of ski areas and resorts in Alberta. The list is organized in order of the size of skiable area.

== Large mountain/foothills resorts ==
- Lake Louise Ski Resort (17 km^{2} (4,201 acres) of skiable area)
- Castle Mountain Resort (over 14.2 km^{2} (3,509 acres) of skiable area)
- Sunshine Village (13.6 km^{2} (3,361 acres) of skiable area)
- Marmot Basin (6.8 km^{2} (1,680 acres) of skiable area)
- Nakiska (3 km^{2} (741 acres) of skiable area)
- Mt Norquay (0.77 km^{2} (190 acres) of skiable area)

== Other mountain/foothills Resorts ==
- Fortress Mountain Resort (15 km^{2} (3,707 acres) of skiable area) - Closed, only open for cat skiing
- Silver Summit (2.6 km^{2} (642 acres) of skiable area)

== Prairie resorts ==
- Canyon Ski Area (0.28 km^{2} (69 acres) of skiable area)
- Hidden Valley Ski Resort
