= Michelsen Farmstead =

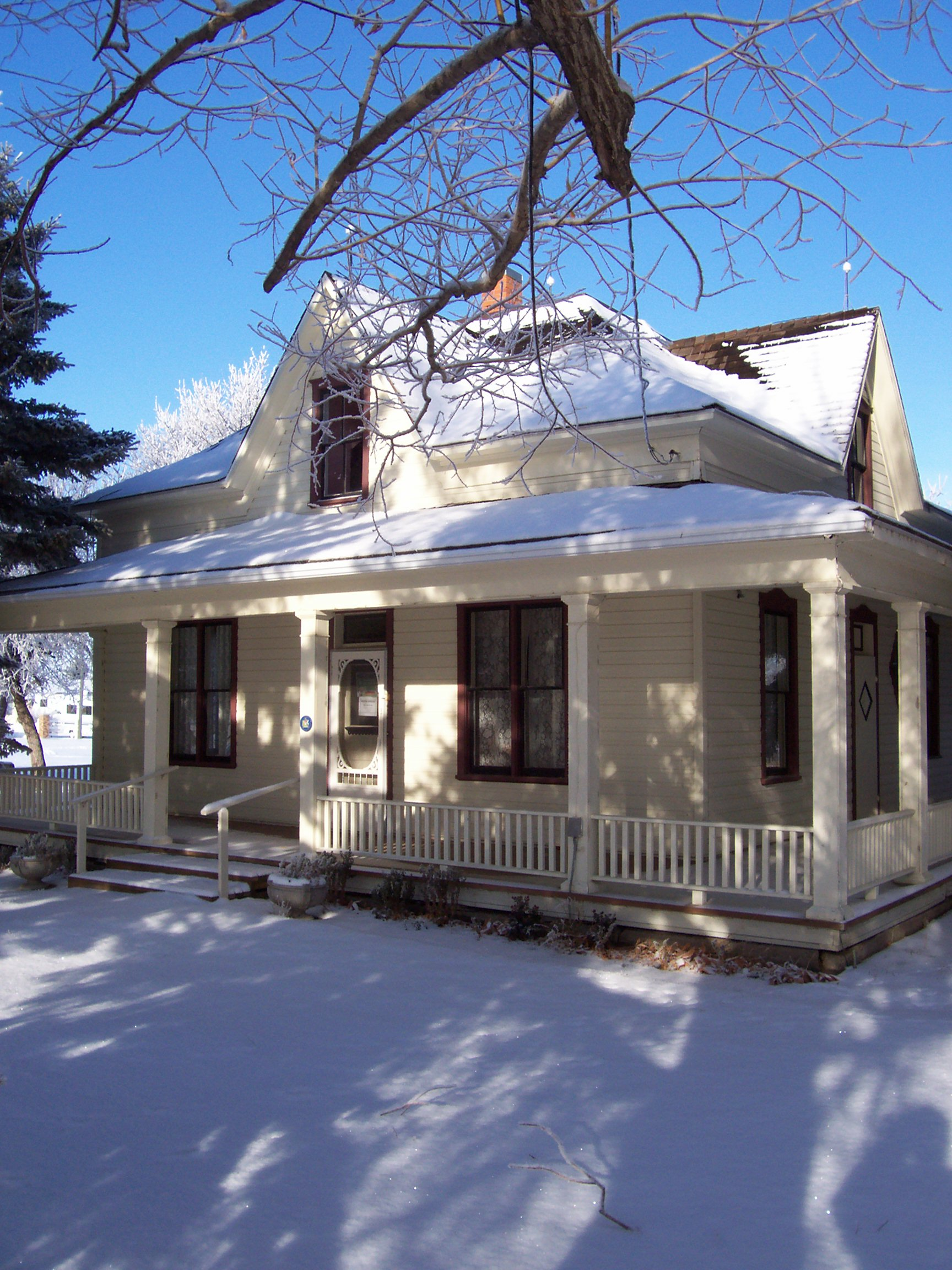
- The restored Michelsen Farmstead.
- Interactive map of the Michelsen Farmstead area

General information
- Architectural style: Victorian
- Location: 533 2nd Ave. & 6th St. Stirling, Alberta, Canada
- Coordinates: 49.498°N 112.525°W
- Construction started: 1902
- Completed: 1912
- Demolished: Provincial Historic Site; Museum
- Client: Stirling Historical Society & Village of Stirling

Technical details
- Structural system: Wood

The Andreas Michelsen Farmstead was originally built as a two-room house in 1902 by Andreas Michelsen. In 1912, an addition to the home was made, resulting in a total of seven rooms, and little has changed since. The homestead consists of a 1 1/2-story Victorian-style farmhouse with a wraparound porch, and various outbuildings including a barn, granary, calving shed, coal shed, machine shed, storage cellar, corrals and pens, and an outhouse. Landscape elements on the property include a dugout, cistern and filter, and garden. The farmstead is located at the corner of 2nd Avenue & 6th Street, on the west half of four blocks in the northwest corner of the National Historic Site of Stirling, Alberta.

The home remained in the Michelsen family until 1995 when the village, in partnership with the Stirling Historical Society, bought the homestead to turn into an interpretative center. The homestead was registered as a Provincial Historic Resource and added to the Alberta Register of Historic Places. The Stirling Historical Society has since restored the property to its original 19th-century style, and the farmstead is now a museum, depicting life as it was from 1900 to the 1930s. Each summer, the Historical Society holds day camps for children and an old-fashioned harvest dance, which is held on the grounds of the Michelsen Farmstead every October.

== History ==
The Michelsen home was a community gathering place for many years, and the family hosted my dances typical of those house parties. The fiddler would lean against the doorway between the two rooms and play whatever the dancers desired. If the group was larger and the weather was good, the dancers were moved to the loft of the barn. Michelsen barn dances were popular for more than 75 years.

As time went on, the day liner to Lethbridge offered new opportunities to the residents of Stirling and the surrounding area. But the Michelsen Farmstead remained a favorite gathering place – though its focus had changed slightly. Farmers from the surrounding area would often drive their teams to Stirling. They would then catch the train to Lethbridge leaving their team and wagon at the Michelsen farm, sometimes for several days.

The popularity of the farm was not restricted to adults. Youngsters found the hayloft to be a perfect place to "sleep over" and the young Michelsen boys carried on endless "Cops and Robbers" shootouts with their friends. The Michelsen boys were the preferred "bad guys" in these games. This latter activity was a source of great concern to one neighbor who predicted a dark future for young boys who spent so much of their time in such "unlawful play". It is one of life's little ironies that Glen Michelsen was the first Stirling native son to join the RCMP and two of his three brothers followed his example by making law enforcement their career.

The continued importance of the Michelsen Farmstead can still be seen today even though no Michelsen's now reside in the home. In 2001 the Andreas Michelsen Homestead was declared a Provincial Historic Resource with the house and outbuildings restored to the period of the 1930s.

== The Michelsens' Family ==
Andreas Michelsen was born in Sleth, Denmark September 20, 1857. His wife, Kirsten Marie, was born in Aarhus, Denmark April 3, 1854. They had a large family of four boys and four girls. The oldest daughter, Lena, was born on October 8, 1880, in Denmark.

The Michelsens' joined the Church of Jesus Christ of Latter-day Saints (LDS Church). Around 1882, as was common at the time, to be closer to the church, Andreas, Kirsten, and Lena immigrated to Monroe, Utah. They had seven more children in Monroe.

In 1900 the church called on some of its people to move to Alberta, where land was abundant but arid and dry. Andreas and Kirstin took their two oldest children by train to Stirling, Alberta. Andreas was at first hesitant about permanently moving to Stirling but his four sons saw the opportunities the area had to offer. It was then decided that Stirling was a good choice for the family, so the four of them headed back to Utah to gather the rest of their family and belongings. In 1901, Stirling was now called their new home.

Shortly after arriving, Andreas and his sons were hired by the LDS Church on the construction of the canal from Kimball, Alberta to the Stirling Siding. The family first lived in a small tent between Cardston and Magrath called Pot Hole Coulee, once the canal was finished the family moved to their land in Stirling. The Michelsens' officially acquired their land in and around Stirling from the Church in 1904 for the work done on the Canal. In 1902 a small two-room house was built on this parcel of land which was later added onto by a local carpenter, George Oler in 1912. Andreas was very active in church and community affairs and was a part of the Stirling Town Council for a year in 1909, and then again in 1913–1914.

Andreas and his four sons; Niels, Sirn, Dan, and Drace farmed and raised cattle around the Stirling district as well as Wrentham by horses until tractors were invented. By then they had their very own Threshing machine.

Andreas (Drace) Niels, and Dan played basketball in Stirling and won champions for several years. Lena had married James Austin and had a son living in Cardston, then Kalispell, Montana. She married for a second time to Sam Lessard. Andreas (Drace) was never married, Annie married Urbann Young and had two boys. Hulda died as a child.

Carrie married Alfred Hirsche, and had five boys and one girl. Niels married Verda Spackman, and had two boys and a girl. Daniel married Lulu Barton, and had four boys and two girls. Soren (Sirn) married Elva Lybbert, and had three girls and two boys. Sirn and his wife Elva raised their family in the Michelsen Farmstead. Sirn died there in 1978. One of Sirn's cowboy buddies, Earl Bascom, was his wife Elva's first cousin. Earl Bascom, who was a famous cowboy artist, often stayed with Sirn and Elva at the Michelsen Farmstead which became a temporary studio where he created some of his artwork.

== Events ==
July–August;

- Old fashioned day at the Farm. (Kids day-camp), first and third weeks in July & August.
- Music on the veranda, first and third weeks in July & August.
- Stirling Settler Days, free tours of the Michelsen Farmstead.

September;

- Fall Festival Village Market, homemade crafts, baking goods, and gift items.

May;

- Historic Lethbridge Week

== See also ==
- List of provincial historic sites of Alberta
- List of attractions and landmarks in Stirling
- Stirling, Alberta
- List of museums
- Farmstead
