= Milk River Ridge Reservoir =

Reservoir in Alberta, Canada

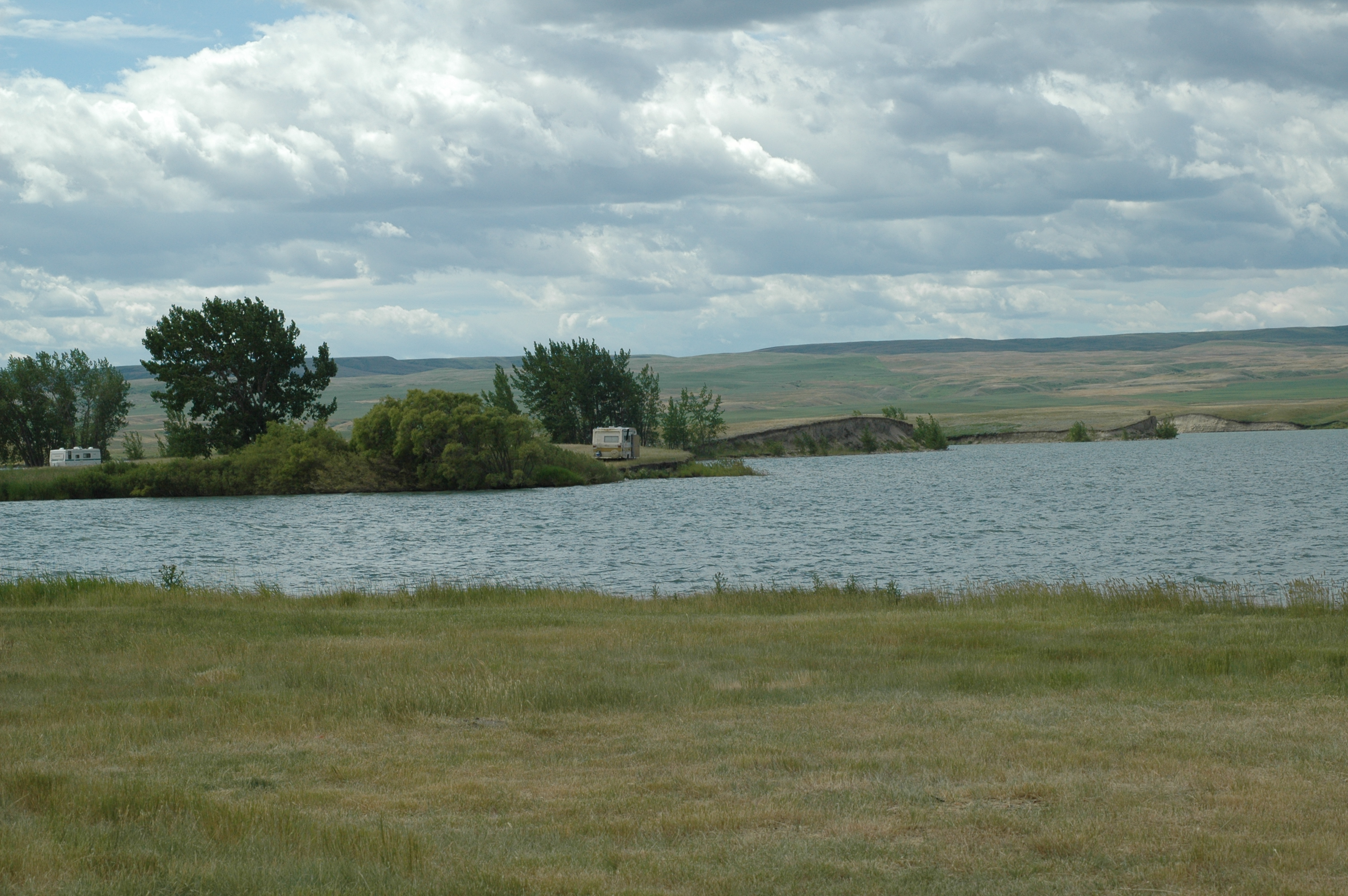
- Looking east across the Milk River Ridge Reservoir

- Location within Canada Location within Alberta
- Location: County of Warner No. 5, Alberta
- Coordinates: 49°22′29″N 112°35′43″W
- Type: Reservoir
- Primary inflows: Nine Mile Coulee
- Primary outflows: Nine Mile Coulee
- Basin countries: Canada
- Max. length: 4.6 km (2.9 mi)
- Max. width: 13.7 km (8.5 mi)
- Surface area: 15.3 km^{2} (5.9 sq mi)
- Average depth: 8.4 m (28 ft)
- Max. depth: 16.5 m (54 ft)
- Surface elevation: 1,032 m (3,386 ft)
- References: Milk River Ridge Reservoir

Milk River Ridge Reservoir is an artificial lake in southern Alberta, Canada. It is located about 44 kilometres (27 mi) south-east of Lethbridge, along Highway 506, west of Highway 4 and is a popular spot for summer activities.

The lake is developed along the Nine Mile Coulee. It lies at an elevation of 1,030 meters (3,380 ft), has a length of 16 kilometres (9.9 mi) and a maximum width of 1.4 kilometres (0.87 mi). It is named for the Milk River Ridge, an elevated area that lies to the south, between the lake and Milk River.

== Historical summary ==
1956: Reservoir built by the Prairie Farm Rehabilitation Administration (PFRA) as a balancing reservoir and offstream storage for St. Mary River Irrigation District.

1974: Alberta Environment owns the reservoir and all structures.

1993-2003: St. Mary River Irrigation District (SMRID) begins monitoring water quality across the irrigation district. Reports prepared by Madawaska Consulting.

1994: Raymond Reservoir Generating Station built by Irrican Power. This generating station diverted a large amount of water from the Ridge Reservoir (80-95%), greatly increasing residence time in the Ridge Reservoir.

1996: St. Mary River Irrigation District begins program to monitor water quality of the water entering, leaving and in the Milk River Ridge Reservoir to determine if there are any changes associated with the diversion of water through the hydro plant at Raymond Reservoir. Madawaska Consulting prepared these reports from 1996 to 2003.

1998: Ridge Water Users contacted PFRA with concerns about taste and odour in water delivered via pipeline from the Ridge Reservoir.

1999-2001: Drought with water rationing in place

2002: Chinook Health Region contacted PFRA with concerns of water quality in the Ridge Reservoir which initiated the forming of the Ridge Reservoir Committee and the follow-up water quality study.

2003: Ridge Reservoir Committee formed to develop and coordinate a collaborative study of the Ridge Reservoir and catchment basin. Committee Members: Town of Raymond, PFRA, Environment Canada, University of Calgary, Health Canada, and Chinook Health Region

2003-2007: Study by Sue Watson, Bunny Mah, Shannon Braithewaite documented issues with water quality, livestock entering reservoir, dead livestock near or in reservoir, algal blooms. Water quality data taken from 2003 to 2007.

2004: St. Mary River Irrigation District Main Canal Drops #4, #5, #6 were brought on-line

2014: Milk River Ridge Reservoir Water Quality Stewardship Initiative (MRRWQSI) begins. Stewardship working Group:

- Alberta Environment and Parks
- Alberta Conservation Association
- County of Warner

Actions taken by the MRRWQSI:

- Installed 45 km (28 mi) of fencing to keep livestock from accessing the reservoir and tributaries (20 km (12 mi) of fencing planned)
- 20 offsite watering units installed
- 20,000 shrubs planted (20,000 additional planned)
- 386 acres (156 ha) reseeded into wildlife habitat
- 6.18 acres (2.50 ha) wetland developed on west end of reservoir
- Phosphorus filter installed
- Spraying, mowing, and discing of areas to protect habitat enhancements and for weed control
- Reclaimed over 20 acres (8.1 ha) of Crown land that was being cropped by local farmers, some of which was on the shores of the reservoir
