= Galt Historic Railway Park =

Railway station in Alberta, Canada

- Location of the museum in Alberta.
- Established: 2000
- Location: Warner County No. 5, Alberta
- Coordinates: 49.498°N 112.525°W
- Type: Open-air, railway
- Collection size: Steam era items, customs office/ telegraph equipment
- Visitors: guided tours available daily, pets welcome. picnic shelter
- Website: galtrailway.com/home/

The Galt Historic Railway Park, collects, preserves, restores, exhibits and interprets artifacts which represent the history and social impact of the "steam" era in southern Alberta and the coal era, with emphasis on Galt Railway and the 1890 International Train Station Depot North West Territories from Coutts/Sweetgrass.

The museum is affiliated with: Canadian Museums Association, Canadian Heritage Information Network, and Virtual Museum of Canada Canadian Council for Rail Heritage, Canadian Rail Museum Association, Rocky Mountain Rail Society, West Coast Rail Association.

== International Train Station Depot ==
International Train Station Depot
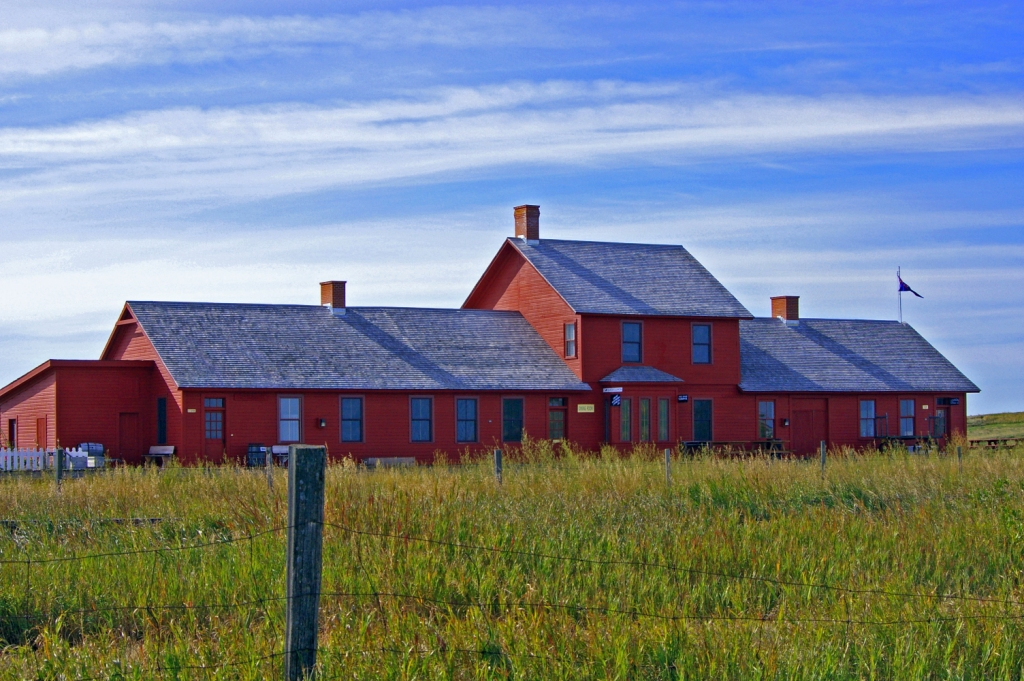
- Restored 1890 International Train Station Customs Depot
- Interactive map of the International Train Station Depot area

General information
- Architectural style: Victorian
- Location: Original Location Coutts, Alberta, Canada; Sweetgrass, Montana, United States
- Construction started: fall 1890u
- Completed: October 1890 prior to narrow gauge rail being laid down.
- Renovated: 2000-to present
- Client: Alberta Railway & Coal Company

Technical details
- Structural system: Wood

Design and construction
- Architects: Sir Alexander Galt; Elliot Galt
- Engineer: sub contractor builder hired by narrow gauge rail contractor Oct 1890

Originally built in 1890 by Sir Alexander Galt and his son Elliott Galt partners in a consortium of investors from Canada, England and the United States. Alexander and his son Elliott Torrance Galt co-founded the Town of Lethbridge, Alberta in 1883, when he established a mine on the banks of the Oldman River in the southwest portion of the District of Alberta, Northwest Territories. The Post Office Department refused to accept the name Lethbridge for the community until 1885 because there was another town with the same name in the Dominion of Canada. Sir Alexander Galt laid out the street plan of Lethbridge's present location in 1885 after his settlement was moved to the prairie level from the river valley. Canada's Governor General, the Marquis of Landsdowne, demonstrated the Dominion government's support of the Galt enterprises, by opening the Galts' railway in September 1885 in Lethbridge.

Galt's company, the North Western Coal and Navigation Company went through a variety of name changes as it moved into railways, land sales and irrigation enterprises. A public park and a museum (formerly a hospital) in Lethbridge and a train station are named after him. Prime Minister Sir Wilfrid Laurier dedicated the Galt Hospital addition, which houses the Galt Museum, in 1910.

Sir Alexander was the founding president of The Guarantee Company of North America in 1872, providing fidelity bonds to guarantee the honesty of employees of railroads and government, which still exists today as the largest provider of surety bonds in all of Canada in public works and government services.

Straddling the Canada–United States border from 1890 to 1915, it is the only existing example of this kind of structure left in Western Canada. The International Border ran through the waiting / dining room. The telegrapher and station agent worked beside the centre section, arranging shipment in Bond to proceed from Coutts, Alberta to Sweetgrass, Montana, and vice versa. It was one of only two "Lunch Stations" along the railway line which ran from Lethbridge, Alberta to Great Falls, Montana. Around 1915, the northern part of the station was moved across the border to Coutts, where it was used by the Canadian Pacific Railway until the closing in the late 1960s.

In 2000 the station was bought by the Great Canadian Plains Railway Society and moved to a 35-acre (14 ha) site, 1 kilometre (0.62 mi) north of Stirling, Alberta, where it has been completely restored back to its original glory, and opened to the public in the summer of 2005.

== Wrentham Ogilvie grain elevator addition ==
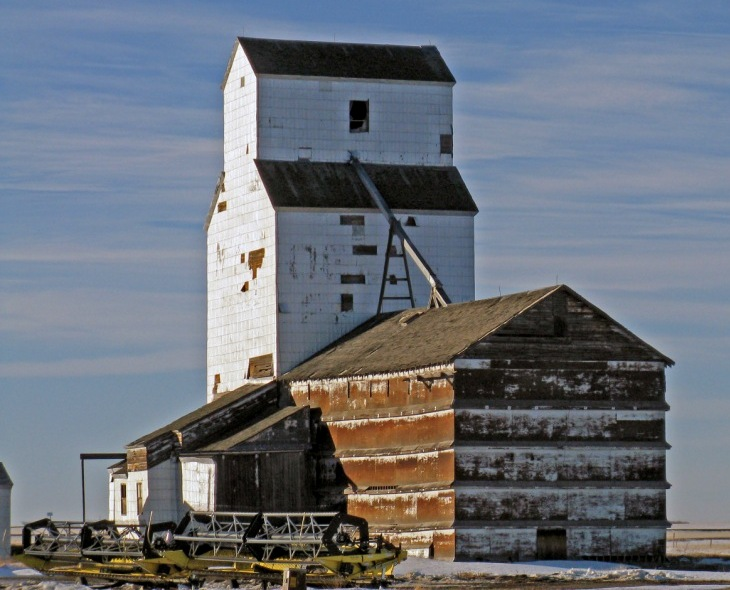
Ogilvie Elevator in Wrentham.

The Ogilvie Wooden Grain Elevator Society (OWGES) is a group of 6 individuals currently working in part with the Galt Railway Park to restore and display the historical significance of Western Canada's disappearing traditional wooden grain elevators. As part of OWGES mission, is to preserve and restore artifacts to educate the public by portraying Southern Alberta’s prairie elevators and their rich cultural heritage impact of Canada's prairie landscape. The prairie grain elevator is a Western Canadian icon that continues to disappear at a rapid rate from Western Canada’s prairie towns, once standing along each town along the railways.

OWGES has been given the opportunity to restore a historic 1925 Ogilvie Flour elevator, the society gained ownership of Alberta's last Ogilvie wood-cribbed elevator in the province in 2015. The elevator is a valuable structure, located 30 kilometres (19 mi) east of the Galt Historic Railway Park in the hamlet of Wrentham. Due to high costs, the societies original plans to move the structure to the Railway Park has changed. OWGES's new mission is to designate the Ogilvie elevator as a Provincial Historic Site of Alberta, placing the structure on the Canadian Register of Historic Places.

OWGES is currently working with the newly established Forty Mile Rail succeeder of the Canadian Pacific Railway's, Stirling Subdivision to Foremost, previously abandoned for eleven years, OWGES will cooperate with Forty Mile Rail to hold historical train rides or day trips from the Galt Historic Railway Park in Stirling to the Ogilvie elevator in Wrentham.

OWGES is currently in the funding process of their project and looking for volunteers and donations to reach their goal of $50,000 to restore the buildings back to an original functioning 1925 grain elevator. Once restored the elevator will hold community events, historic demonstrations and educational tours will take place.

== See also ==
- Canadian Pacific Railway
- List of attractions and landmarks in Stirling
- List of heritage railways in Canada
- List of provincial historic sites of Alberta
