= List of historic places in Alberta's Rockies =

This article is a list of historic places in Alberta's Rockies, including those in Banff National Park and Jasper National Park. It includes places entered on the Canadian Register of Historic Places, whether they are federal, provincial, or municipal.

== List ==
Name	Address	Coordinates	Government recognition (CRHP №)	Wikidata ID	Image
Abbot Pass Refuge Cabin		51°21′51″N 116°17′25″W	Federal (1972, (1971)	Q4664206	More images
Bunkhouse		51°31′23″N 116°4′41″W	Federal (2017)	Q24056341	More images
Creek Cabin		51°31′22″N 116°4′42″W	Federal (2018)	Q24056343	More images
Former Bathhouse		51°31′24″N 116°4′41″W	Federal (2020)	Q24056344	More images
Honeymoon Cabin		51°31′23″N 116°4′38″W	Federal (2021)	Q24056346	More images
Main Building		51°31′22″N 116°4′39″W	Federal (2027)	Q24056347	More images
Wolverine Cabin		51°31′22″N 116°4′38″W	Federal (2028)	Q24056349	More images
Skoki Ski Lodge		51°31′20″N 116°4′30″W	Federal (2030)	Q7536163	More images
Tanglewood	208 Beaver Street; Banff AB	51°10′37″N 115°34′08″W	Banff municipality (2204)	Q42331897	More images
Luxton Residence	206 Beaver Street; Banff AB	51°10′36″N 115°34′08″W	Banff municipality (2205)	Q42331604	More images
Beaver Lodge	212 Beaver Street; Banff AB	51°10′38″N 115°34′08″W	Banff municipality (2206)	Q41796628	More images
Tarry-A-While	117 Grizzly Street; Banff AB	51°10′30″N 115°33′54″W	Banff municipality (2208)	Q42331902	More images
Dave White Block	103 / 105 Banff Avenue; Banff AB	51°10′29″N 115°34′19″W	Banff municipality (2209)	Q41796671	More images
Harmony Lane	111 Banff Avenue; Banff AB	51°10′30″N 115°34′19″W	Banff municipality (2211)	Q41796707	More images
Wardens Cabin	along Cascade Fire Road; Improvement District No. 09 (Banff) AB	51°39′58.165″N 115°49′30.756″W	Federal (2834)	Q41283496	Upload Photo
Pyramid Lake Island Picnic Shelter	Pyramid Lake Road	52°55′29″N 118°5′53″W	Federal (2838)	Q24070684	Upload Photo
Halfway Hut		51°28′26″N 116°5′54″W	Federal (2846)	Q24066984	More images
Cave and Basin Bathing Pavilion	311 Cave Avenue; Banff AB	51°10′N 115°34′W	Federal (3088)	Q41282464	More images
Jasper Canadian National Railway Station	607 Connaught Drive	52°52′34″N 118°4′48″W	Federal (3090, (6761)	Q3096657	More images
Administration Building	101 Mountain Avenue; Banff AB	51°10′16″N 115°34′16″W	Federal (3340)	Q41283829	More images
National Training Centre Barn		52°57′46″N 118°3′29″W	Federal (3463)	Q24087834	Upload Photo
National Training Centre Bull Pen		52°57′46″N 118°3′29″W	Federal (3464)	Q24070686	Upload Photo
National Training Centre Bunkhouse		52°57′46″N 118°3′29″W	Federal (3469)	Q24087835	Upload Photo
National Training Centre Garage		52°57′46″N 118°3′29″W	Federal (3471)	Q24087836	Upload Photo
National Training Centre Ice House		52°57′46″N 118°3′29″W	Federal (3472)	Q24087837	Upload Photo
National Training Centre Lodge		52°57′45.490″N 118°3′29.833″W	Federal (3473)	Q24087838	Upload Photo
National Training Centre Machine Shed		52°57′46″N 118°3′29″W	Federal (3474)	Q24087839	Upload Photo
National Training Centre Saddle Shed		52°57′46″N 118°3′29″W	Federal (3475)	Q24087840	Upload Photo
National Training Centre Smithy		52°57′46″N 118°3′29″W	Federal (3476)	Q24087841	Upload Photo
National Training Centre Warden House		52°57′42.602″N 118°3′30.334″W	Federal (3478)	Q24087842	Upload Photo
Wardens Operational Centre, former Fish Hatchery		52°59′0″N 118°6′0″W	Federal (3483)	Q24070689	Upload Photo
Maligne Lake Chalet		52°39′58″N 117°31′1″W	Federal (3547)	Q24276640	Upload Photo
Old Jasper Fire Hall	411 Patricia Street; AB	52°52′39″N 118°4′53″W	Federal (3603)	Q24070692	More images
Superintendent's Residence	510 Robson Street	52°52′39″N 118°5′0″W	Federal (3604)	Q24070694	More images
Jackman Garage	411 Patricia Street	52°52′41.491″N 118°4′48.954″W	Federal (3606)	Q24070697	More images
Jackman Residence	411 Patricia Street	52°52′42″N 118°4′49″W	Federal (3607)	Q24070699	More images
Municipal Library Building	500 Robson Drive	52°52′39″N 118°5′0″W	Federal (3655)	Q24070701	More images
Jasper National Park of Canada, Wardens Residence No.1	Poboktan Creek, Sunwapta Falls; Improvement District No. 12 (Jasper National Park) AB	52°48′14″N 118°10′19″W	Federal (4387)	Q41282865	Upload Photo
Lake Louise Canadian Pacific Railway Station	200 Sentinel Road, Lake Louise	51°25′27″N 116°11′2″W	Federal (4516)	Q6476687	More images
Banff Canadian Pacific Railway Station	327 Railway Ave	51°10′55″N 115°34′34″W	Federal (4529)	Q4854878	More images
Canmore North West Mounted Police Barracks	609 8th Street	51°5′21″N 115°21′22″W	Alberta (4999)	Q24075438	More images
Banff Springs Hotel	405 Spray Avenue	51°9′51″N 115°33′42″W	Federal (7373)	Q806429	More images
Upper Hot Springs Bath House		51°9′3″N 115°33′40″W	Federal (7379)	Q24066986	More images
East Gate Registration Buildings, Building 1		51°8′6″N 115°24′25″W	Federal (7380)	Q24066987	More images
East Gate Registration Buildings, Building 2		51°8′6″N 115°24′25″W	Federal (7381)	Q24066989	More images
East Gate Registration Buildings, Building 3		51°8′6″N 115°24′25″W	Federal (7382)	Q24066990	More images
Cave and Basin	311 Cave Avenue	51°10′10″N 115°35′28″W	Federal (7567)	Q2943271	More images
Jasper House	Highway 16, Roadside pullout 31 km east of Jasper town AB	53°8′48″N 117°59′5″W	Federal (7884)	Q6163971	More images
McDougall Memorial United Church	65195 Highway 1A	51°11′14″N 114°49′30″W	Alberta (8788)	Q24075193	More images
Colonel's Cabin	south of Seebe; AB	51°1′44″N 115°2′6″W	Alberta (9017)	Q24075897	Upload Photo
Jasper Park Information Centre	810 Connaught Drive	52°52′38″N 118°4′52″W	Federal (3091, (9367)	Q6164023	More images
Little Heaven Warden Patrol Cabin	Improvement District No. 12 (Jasper National Park) AB	53°23′54″N 118°33′14″W	Federal (9481)	Q41283447	Upload Photo
Rocky Forks Warden Cabin	Improvement District No. 12 (Jasper National Park) AB	52°50′42″N 117°24′07″W	Federal (9484)	Q41282907	Upload Photo
Cuthead Warden Cabin		51°36′0″N 116°2′56″W	Federal (9486)	Q24066993	Upload Photo
Camp Parker Warden Cabin		52°9′56″N 117°2′17″W	Federal (9487)	Q24066994	Upload Photo
Devonian Pavilion	Cascades of Time Garden; Banff AB	51°10′15″N 115°34′23″W	Federal (9490)	Q41283646	More images
Medicine Tent Warden Cabin		51°29′10″N 116°14′31″W	Federal (9495)	Q24066996	Upload Photo
Jacques Lake Warden Cabin Tack Shed	South Boundary Trail; AB	52°59′0″N 118°6′0″W	Federal (9497)	Q24070704	Upload Photo
Fourpoint Warden Cabin		52°59′0″N 118°6′0″W	Federal (9498)	Q24070706	Upload Photo
Isaac Creek Warden Cabin	South Boundary Trail; AB	52°23′41.262″N 117°0′1.336″W	Federal (9499)	Q24070708	Upload Photo
Topaz Warden Patrol Cabin	North Boundary Trail; Improvement District No. 12 (Jasper National Park) AB	53°23′18″N 118°47′42″W	Federal (9502)	Q41283395	Upload Photo
Rustic Lookout Pavilion	Cascades of Time Garden; Banff AB	51°10′14″N 115°34′21″W	Federal (9582)	Q41283624	More images
Cambrian Pavilion	Cascades of Time Garden; Banff AB	51°10′15″N 115°34′21″W	Federal (9586)	Q41283063	More images
Egypt Lakes Warden Cabin		51°6′N 115°54′W	Federal (9738)	Q24066997	Upload Photo
Fortune Warden Cabin		51°6′N 115°30′W	Federal (9739)	Q24066998	Upload Photo
Sandhills Wardens Cabin		51°36′20″N 115°53′6″W	Federal (9837)	Q24067001	Upload Photo
Clearwater Lakes Warden Cabin		51°46′32.182″N 116°9′0.338″W	Federal (9845)	Q24067002	Upload Photo
Windy Lodge Warden Cabin		51°36′0″N 115°40′0″W	Federal (9911)	Q24067004	Upload Photo
Adolphus Warden Patrol Cabin	Improvement District No. 12 (Jasper National Park) AB	53°11′02″N 119°06′32″W	Federal (9958)	Q41283602	Upload Photo
Bryant Creek Warden Cabin		50°53′38″N 115°31′37″W	Federal (10040)	Q24067005	Upload Photo
Divide Warden Cabin		51°36′N 116°3′W	Federal (10049)	Q24067006	Upload Photo
Upper Hot Pool Residence		51°9′4″N 115°33′40″W	Federal (10100)	Q24067007	More images
Superintendent's Residence	313 Buffalo Street; Banff AB	52°52′36″N 118°05′01″W	Federal (10136)	Q41283015	More images
Rescue Building	Connaught Drive	52°52′39″N 118°4′44″W	Federal (10144)	Q24070710	More images
Byng Warden Patrol Cabin	North Boundary Trail; Improvement District No. 12 (Jasper National Park) AB	53°21′53″N 119°01′23″W	Federal (10152)	Q41283471	Upload Photo
Middle Forks Warden Patrol Cabin	Improvement District No. 12 (Jasper National Park) AB	52°32′53″N 118°03′58″W	Federal (10153)	Q41283662	Upload Photo
Saskatchewan Crossing Warden's Residence No. 1		51°58′24″N 116°43′30″W	Federal (10236)	Q24067008	More images
Superintendent's Garage	510 Robson Street	52°52′37″N 118°5′1″W	Federal (10369)	Q24070713	More images
Ralph Connor Memorial United Church	621 8th Street	51°5′20.91″N 115°21′25.75″W	Alberta (10413)	Q24075443	More images
Athabasca Pass		52°22′35.00″N 118°10′59.99″W	Federal (10499)	Q2981956	More images
Yellowhead Pass	Roadside pullout, 9 km west of Jasper town on Highway 16; AB	52°53′29.000″N 118°27′51.998″W	Federal (10690)	Q178031	More images
Information Building	224 Banff Avenue; Banff AB	51°10′41″N 115°34′12″W	Federal (10941)	Q41282841	More images
Hoodoo Warden Cabin	Improvement District No. 12 (Jasper National Park) AB	53°15′10″N 118°53′02″W	Federal (10995)	Q41282680	Upload Photo
Howse Pass		51°53′9″N 116°47′35″W	Federal (11480)	Q2981957	More images
Rat's Nest Cave		51°3′28″N 115°15′14″W	Alberta (11578)	Q24075211	More images
Sulphur Mountain Cosmic Ray Station		51°8′48″N 115°34′40″W	Federal (11395, (11747)	Q7636527	More images
Brazeau Warden Cabin	South Boundary Trail; Improvement District No. 12 (Jasper National Park) AB	52°23′47″N 117°01′37″W	Federal (13123)	Q41283375	Upload Photo
Banff Park Museum	91 Banff Avenue	51°10′26″N 115°34′19″W	Federal (14621, (3215)	Q3813327	More images
Jacques Lake Warden Cabin	South Boundary Trail; AB	52°59′0″N 118°6′0″W	Federal (15275)	Q24070715	More images
Cottage - Office Recognized Federal Heritage Building	Improvement District No. 12 (Jasper National Park) AB	52°48′14″N 118°10′19″W			Upload Photo
St. Mary & St. George Anglican Church	Geikie Street	52°52′30″N 118°5′2″W		Q19874630	More images

== See also ==
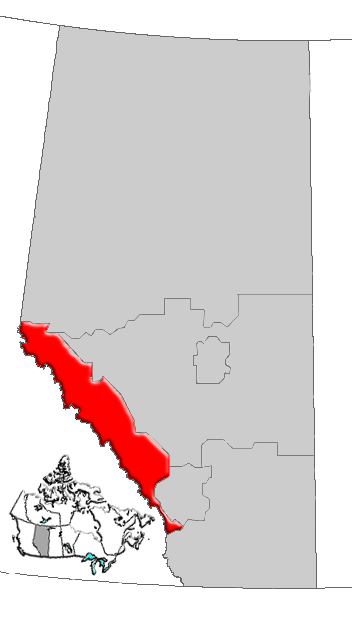
- List of historic places in Alberta
- List of historic places in Calgary
- List of historic places in Edmonton
