= List of National Historic Sites of Canada in Alberta =

As of March 2018, there are 61 National Historic Sites (French: Lieux historiques nationaux) in the province of Alberta, 16 of which are owned or administered by Parks Canada. The first three sites in Alberta were designated in 1923: the site of rival trading posts Fort Augustus and Fort Edmonton, the site of the Frog Lake Massacre and the site of the first outpost of the North-West Mounted Police in Western Canada at Fort Macleod.

Numerous National Historic Events also occurred across Alberta, and are identified at places associated with them, using the same style of federal plaque which marks National Historic Sites. Several National Historic Persons are commemorated throughout the province in the same way.

== National Historic Sites ==
✝ UNESCO World Heritage Site

Administered by Parks Canada

Site (Note: This list uses names designated by the Historic Sites and Monuments Board of Canada, which may differ from other names for these sites.)	Date(s)	Designated	Location	Description	Image
Abbot Pass Refuge Cabin	1922 (completed)	1992	Abbot Pass; 51°21′50.6″N 116°17′24.75″W	An alpine hut located at an elevation of 2925 metres in the Alberta Rockies, near the continental divide in Banff National Park, near its boundary with Yoho National Park in British Columbia	Image of Abbot Pass Refuge Cabin
Áísínai'pi✝		2004	Milk River; 49°4′55″N 111°37′1″W	Also known as Writing-on-Stone Provincial Park, it serves as both a nature preserve and protection for a large number of aboriginal rock carvings and paintings	This petroglyph was created prior to the arrival of the horse. It shows a warrior carrying a body shield
Athabasca Pass	1811 (first documented by non-Aboriginal people)	1971	Jasper National Park; 52°22′35″N 118°11′00″W	A major point on the fur trade route between Rupert's Land and the Columbia District, used by the York Factory Express	Athabasca Pass sign
Atlas No. 3 Coal Mine	1936 (opened)	2001	Drumheller; 51°19′43.07″N 112°28′57.04″W	An exceptionally well-preserved coal-mining landscape; played a significant role in the coal history of the Drumheller Valley, the most productive plains coalfield in Alberta and southeastern British Columbia	View of the Atlas Coal Mine tipple, main conveyor belt, and old blacksmith's shop
Banff Park Museum	1903 (completed)	1985	Banff National Park; 51°10′25.57″N 115°34′17.9″W	A rustic log-faced building set prominently within a landscaped park in the Banff townsite, containing early botanical and zoological exhibits from Banff National Park in early twentieth-century glass cases	Exterior view of the front facade of the Banff Park Museum
Banff Springs Hotel	1928 (completed)	1988	Banff National Park; 51°09′52.2″N 115°33′47.7″W	A former railway hotel constructed in Scottish Baronial style at the base of Sulphur Mountain, built to replace a wooden 1888 hotel which burned down in 1926	Image of the Banff Springs Hotel
Bar U Ranch	1882 (established)	1989	Longview; 50°25′11″N 114°14′0″W	A historic ranch in the Alberta foothills, it played an important role in the ranching industry in Canada; a cultural landscape representative of Alberta ranching in the 1880-1950 period, it embodies the enduring rural character and traditional elements, both natural and man-made, all perfectly preserved	Image of Bar U Ranch
Beaulieu	1891 (completed)	1992	Calgary; 51.04043°N 114.07835°W	Known as Lougheed House, a mansion in Calgary's Beltline district originally built for Senator James Alexander Lougheed	Exterior of Lougheed House
Blackfoot Crossing	1877 (treaty)	1925	Cluny; 50°48′15″N 112°54′23″W	A traditional meeting place on the Blackfoot reserve, where representations of the Crown and the Siksika, Northern Peigan, Kainai, Nakoda and Tsuu T'ina peoples met to sign Treaty 7 in 1877	Blackfoot Crossing Historic Site Plaque
British Block Cairn	1400 CE (ca.)	1973	Canadian Forces Base Suffield; 50°36′30.24″N 110°35′32.28″W	A large boulder cairn surrounded by a ring of stones, an important example of Niitsitapi cultural heritage	The center stone cairn with a Napi effigy in the foreground
Brooks Aqueduct	1914 (completed)	1983	Brooks; 50°31′44.04″N 111°51′18″W	A landmark irrigation project built by the Canadian Pacific Railway, spanning a 3.2 kilometre valley and irrigating a section of south-eastern Alberta	Brooks Aqueduct National Historic Site
Calgary City Hall	1911 (completed)	1984	Calgary; 51°2′46″N 114°3′26″W	A four-storey sandstone building with central clock tower, designed in the Romanesque Revival style and serving as the focal point of Calgary's city hall complex	Exterior of Calgary City Hall
Cave and Basin	1859 (first documented by non-Aboriginal people)	1981	Banff National Park; 51°10′12″N 115°35′20.76″W	The site of natural thermal mineral springs around which Canada's first national park, Banff National Park, was established	Interior of the Cave at Cave and Basin National Historic Site in Banff, Alberta, Canada, showing an overhead opening, small waterfall, and pool of water
Central Memorial Park and Library	1889	2018	Calgary; 51°02′28.1″N 114°04′14.9″W	Formal gardens with memorials and a striking Carnegie library; symbol of quest for an attractive, cultured new city in the West	Central Memorial Park
Coleman	1903 (establishment of townsite)	2001	Crowsnest Pass (municipality); 49°38′7″N 114°30′11″W	A preserved coal-mining landscape in one of the most important coal producing centres in the Crowsnest Pass, the greatest coalfield in Alberta and southeastern British Columbia	Coleman Alberta
Earthlodge Village	1740 (c.)	1972	Gleichen; 50°47′4″N 112°51′25″W	Earthwork defensive fortifications, unique in Canada, constructed by an unidentified people	Earthlodge Village
First Oil Well in Western Canada	1902	1965	Waterton Lakes National Park; 49°4′15.53″N 113°59′12.37″W	First commercially productive oil well in Western Canada; discovered in 1902 and running dry in 1904, it signaled the presence of much larger fields that were later developed; a monument was erected over the well in 1968	Historic marker at the location of the first oil well
Fort Assiniboine	1823 (fort established)	1935	Woodlands County; 54°20′1″N 114°46′19″W	A trading post established by the Hudson's Bay Company which served as a stopping point along the Klondike Trail	View of large wheel and pick axe at Fort Assiniboine
Fort Augustus and Fort Edmonton	1795 (Fort Augustus built), 1796 (first Fort Edmonton built)	1923	Fort Saskatchewan; 53°42′58″N 113°13′15″W	The site of rival trading posts established by the North West Company and the Hudson's Bay Company, described as being a "musket-shot" apart	Fort Augustus and Edmonton House plaque
Fort Calgary	1875 (established)	1925	Calgary; 51°2′43″N 114°2′45″W	A fort established by the North-West Mounted Police, located at the confluence of the Bow and Elbow rivers in what is now Calgary	Part of the Fort Calgary historic site. This is a year 2000 "replica" of the soldier's residence originally built in 1888.
Fort Chipewyan	1788 (established)	1930	Wood Buffalo; 58°42′44″N 111°08′54″W	One of the oldest European settlements in Alberta, established by the North West Company when it built a trading post there in 1788	
Fort Dunvegan	1805 (established)	1947	Dunvegan; 55°55′25″N 118°35′40″W	Site of a trading post established by the North West Company; was the most important post in the Peace River Valley and a centre of fur trade in a chain of communication westward into British Columbia	Fort Dunvegan
Fort Edmonton III	1830 (established)	1959	Edmonton; 53°32′1.37″N 113°30′23.51″W	The final Hudson's Bay Company fort to bear the "Fort Edmonton" name, evolved into present-day Edmonton; a reconstruction of fort was built several kilometres from the site, and forms a part of Fort Edmonton Park	A monochrome photograph of the North Saskatchewan River with Fort Edmonton in the background
Fort Fork	1792 (established)	1928	Peace River; 56°8′15″N 117°28′30″W	Starting point of Alexander MacKenzie's route to Pacific, 1793; connected with the exploration of the country, was replaced by Fort Dunvegan, another National Historic Site	Fort Fork sign
Fort Macleod	1874 (established)	1923	Fort Macleod; 49°43′32.1″N 113°23′51.1″W	A fort established in 1874 on an island on the Oldman River, it was the first outpost of the North-West Mounted Police in Western Canada, and served as NWMP headquarters between 1874 and 1878	View of the Fort Macleod pallisades
Fort Vermilion	1788 (first fort established), 1828 (fort moved), 1908 (Old Bay House completed)	1968	Fort Vermilion; 58°23′4″N 116°2′26″W	The "Old Bay House" is the only Hudson's Bay Company factor's house on its original location in Alberta, the last remaining structure of the fort that evolved into the present-day hamlet of Fort Vermilion	Exterior view of the Old Bay House
Fort Whoop-Up	1870 (established)	1963	Lethbridge; 49°41′31″N 112°51′24″W	Originally named Fort Hamilton, the Fort Whoop-Up trading post became the centre of the illegal whisky trade in the region, contributing to the formation of the North-West Mounted Police in 1874 to police Canada's western territories	Photo of Fort Whoop Up National Historic Site, August 2008
Frog Lake	1885 (uprising)	1923	Frog Lake; 53.831186°N 110.358696°W	Site of the Frog Lake Massacre, a Cree uprising during the North-West Rebellion prompted by what seemed to be unfair treaties by the Canadian government and the dwindling buffalo population	Frog Lake National Historic Site cairn and plaque
Government House in Edmonton, Alberta	1911 (completed)	2012	Edmonton; 53°32′29.88″N 113°32′38.1″W	Served as official residence of Alberta's first six Lieutenant Governors; its imposing exterior, prominent location and distinctive architecture symbolize Alberta's new provincial status and Edmonton's new role as capital in the early 20th century	Exterior of Government House
Head-Smashed-In Buffalo Jump✝	3500 BCE (ca.) (usage began), 1880s (first documented by non-Aboriginal people)	1968	Municipal District of Willow Creek No. 26; 49°42′0″N 113°38′0″W	A buffalo jump located where the foothills of the Rocky Mountains begin to rise from the prairie, used for 5,500 years by the indigenous peoples of the plains to kill buffalo by driving them off the 11-metre-high cliff (A UNESCO World Heritage Site)	The view north along the top of the cliffs at Head-Smashed-In Buffalo Jump
Heritage Hall - Southern Alberta Institute of Technology	1922 (completed)	1987	Calgary; 51°03′43″N 114°05′29″W	A three-storey educational building prominently situated on the brow of the Bow River valley, constructed in the Collegiate Gothic style, representative of the growth of post-secondary educational institutions in Canada in the early 20th century	Exterior view of Heritage Hall at SAIT Polytechnic
Howse Pass	1807 (first European exploration)	1978	Blaeberry River and Banff National Park; 51°48′53.53″N 116°46′20.31″W	An early nineteenth-century transportation route through the Canadian Rockies; was also used by the native Ktunaxa First Nation to gain access to the buffalo herds on the plains east of the mountains	Black and white photograph of pack horses and a camp in the Howse Pass in 1902
Jasper House	1830 (completed)	1924	Jasper National Park; 53°8′48.51″N 117°59′3.1″W	Archaeological remains of a fur trade post that served as a major destination for travellers using the Athabasca and the Yellowhead passes and the First Nations route through the Smoky River Pass	Watercolour by Paul Kane of Jasper House in 1847
Jasper Park Information Centre	1914 (completed)	1992	Jasper National Park; 52°52′38.32″N 118°4′51.01″W	A rustic fieldstone park building, symbolic of early architecture within Canada's national parks	Exterior view of the Jasper Park Information Centre
Lac Ste. Anne Pilgrimage	1889 (established)	1984	Lac Ste. Anne County; 53°42′40″N 114°23′49″W	First Roman Catholic mission to be established by the renowned priest, Albert Lacombe	Lac Ste. Anne Pilgrimage
Leduc-Woodbend Oilfield	1946 (established)	1990	Leduc; 53°19′46.45″N 113°43′31.01″W	Site of a major crude oil discovery in Alberta, which led to the post-World War II boom in petroleum exploration and development in Western Canada	View of the Leduc No. 1 oil well
Maligne Lake Chalet and Guest House	1935 (built)	2015	Jasper National Park; 52.729652°N 117.639632°W	Rustic lodge evokes early mountain tourism and the role of guides, outfitters and railroads in the development of national parks	
Medalta Potteries	1912 (established)	1985	Medicine Hat; 50°1′55″N 110°38′58″W	Early twentieth century beehive kilns and manufacturing buildings; the first western Canadian manufacturer to ship goods east of the Great Lakes	Medalta Potteries
Medicine Hat Clay Industries		1999	Medicine Hat; 50°1′53″N 110°39′3″W	A cultural landscape illustrating the factors (local clay beds, access to railway transportation, vast supplies of natural gas to fire the kilns) that led to Medicine Hat's emergence as the largest supplier of clay products west of Ontario	Kilns at Medalta Potteries in Medicine Hat
Mewata Drill Hall / Calgary Drill Hall	1918 (completed)	1989	Calgary; 51°02′45″N 114°05′20″W	A large-scale drill hall, the scale and prominent location of which exemplify the national pride that greeted Canada's strong performance in the South African War and the First World War	Calgary Drill Hall
Nordegg	1911 (mine established)	2001	Nordegg; 52°28′30″N 116°4′24″W	An important coal mining landscape, with many mining and related resources still existing on site	Nordegg No. 2 Mine
Notre Dame des Victoires / Lac La Biche Mission	1853 (established)	1989	Lac La Biche; 54°49′15″N 112°5′44″W	An important Roman Catholic mission, established by the Oblates of Mary Immaculate, which served as the hub of various portage routes	Notre Dame des Victoires / Lac La Biche Mission National Historic Site of Canada
Old Women's Buffalo Jump		1960	Cayley	An aboriginal bison drive in use for roughly 2,000 years; remained undisturbed for centuries and presents a visually dramataic and archaeologically important example of a buffalo jump	Old Woman's Buffalo Jump
Palace Theatre	1921 (completed)	1996	Calgary	A movie palace designed by internationally renowned theatre architect C. Howard Crane, and one of four surviving movie theatres in Canada built by the Allen Chain	Front facade of the Palace Theatre
Prince of Wales Hotel	1927 (completed)	1992	Waterton Lakes National Park; 49°03′32″N 113°54′13″W	A landmark hotel constructed in the rustic-design style, representing the golden age of railway resort development in Canada's national parks	Exterior view of the Prince of Wales Hotel with the Canadian Rockies in the background
Reader Rock Garden	1913 (begun)	2018	Calgary; 51.0299°N 114.055°W	Scientific and aesthetic horticultural garden laid out by William R. Reader in the Arts and Crafts-style; showcases and tests the possibilities of gardening in Calgary; admired for its beauty and botanical diversity, inspiring professional and amateur gardeners	Reader Rock Garden
Rocky Mountain House	1799 (established)	1926	Rocky Mountain House, Alberta; 52.361495°N 114.970471°W	An archaeological site that contains the remains of several early 19th-century fur trade forts known by the names of Rocky Mountain House (established by the North West Company) and Acton House (established by the Hudson's Bay Company)	Rocky Mountain House NHS
Rundle's Mission	1847 (established)	1963	Pigeon Lake; 53.025°N 114.067°W	The site of the first Protestant mission in the Canadian Prairies, it was established by Reverend Robert Terrill Rundle; eventually left after ill health, it operated until 1906	Rundel's Mission NHS
Skoki Ski Lodge	1936 (completed)	1992	Banff National Park; 51°31′23″N 116°04′35″W	A rustic ski lodge resort, representing the early visual identity of Canada's mountain parks and of the early days of tourism in Banff National Park	Skoki Ski Lodge
St. Patrick's Roman Catholic Church	1914 (completed)	1990	Medicine Hat; 50°2′43″N 110°40′50″W	A noted example of Gothic Revival architecture in Alberta; its modern materials and relatively severe and planar quality represents a marriage of early 20th-century aesthetic with French Gothic Revival details; distinguished by its pale, smooth concrete decorations	St. Patrick's Roman Catholic Church in Medicine Hat, Alberta
Stephen Avenue	1880 (established)	2002	Calgary; 51.0456°N 114.0630°W	A late-nineteenth-century retail streetscape in downtown Calgary; tells the processes of prairie urban development, the rising importance of the retail sector of the Canadian economy, and the central role retail streets play in Canadian urban experience; façades reflect the evolution of architectural style in commercial buildings from the late 19th century to the 1930s	View of historic buildings located along Stephen Avenue
Stirling Agricultural Village	1899 (established)	1997	Stirling	The best surviving example of a Mormon agricultural village in Canada, following the Plat of Zion model	View of Michelsen Farmstead, a Provincial Historic Site of Alberta, located in the Stirling Agricultural Village
Suffield Tipi Rings		1973	Cypress County	Various sets of archaeological remains relating to the cultural occupations by the Niitsitapi, featuring tipi rings, medicine wheels and other rock arrangements	
Sulphur Mountain Cosmic Ray Station	1957 (completed)	1982	Banff National Park; 51°07′25″N 115°33′20″W	A former laboratory located near the summit of Sulphur Mountain in Banff National Park; Canada's most important cosmic ray observatory from the 1950s, contributed to understanding of how the sun affects the earth's environment; part of nine monitoring stations built to meet Canada's commitment to International Geophysical Year of 1957-58	View of the existing weather observatory at the former site of the Sulphur Mountain Cosmic Ray Station
Temple of the Church of Jesus Christ of Latter Day Saints	1923 (completed)	1992	Cardston	A monumental modern temple in historic Mormon centre, radical departure from other Mormon temple designs; notable for its high quality materials and exceptional level of craftsmanship; built in the Prairie School style of Frank Lloyd Wright reminiscent of Unity Temple, reflects Hyrum Pope and Harold W. Burton's desire to achieve unity of "modern and ancient" building design	View of the Carsdton Alberta Temple at night
Territorial Court House	1904 (completed)	1980	Fort Macleod	The oldest court house in Alberta and one of the few buildings surviving from the period of Territorial administration of the Canadian Prairies	Territorial Court House, Fort Macleod
Treaty Nº 7 Signing Site	1877 (treaty signed)	1925	Wheatland County	The site where representatives of the Siksika, Pekuni, Kainai, Nakoda and Tsuu T'ina peoples met with representatives of the Crown to sign Treaty No. 7 in September 1877	Treaty No. 7 Signing Site
Turner Valley Gas Plant	1914 (established)	1995	Turner Valley	A petroleum industrial complex comprising 22 metal buildings and related infrastructure, and the site of two early gas wells that established the Turner Valley as the most important oil field in Alberta	Turner Valley Gas Plant
Turner Valley Oilfield	1914 (established)	1990	Turner Valley	The first major oil field in Alberta, plants provided only extensive gas-processing system in the province; discoveries in 1924 made oilfield the leading producer in Canada, and in 1936 reached its peak output; production declined after 1942, but still remains significant producer of oil and gas	Turner Valley Oilfield National Historic Site of Canada plaque
Victoria Settlement	1863 (established)	2001	Smoky Lake	A cultural landscape illustrating major themes in the development of the Canadian Prairies, including the rise of the fur trade, the establishment of the Métis river lot system, the arrival of missions, prairie agricultural development and the arrival of eastern European immigrants	Victoria Historic District monument
Wetaskiwin Court House	1909 (completed)	1980	Wetaskiwin	A court house symbolic of the rapid growth of the justice system in Alberta, typifying court house design during this formative period in the growth of western Canada	Wetaskiwin City Hall
Yellowhead Pass		1971	Jasper National Park; 52°53′33″N 118°27′50″W	An important transportation route through the Canadian Rockies, it was used for centuries by the First Nations peoples, the Hudson's Bay Company, and the Grand Trunk Pacific and Canadian Northern Railway companies	Image of a Canadian National Railways EMD GP9 locomotive climbing in the Yellowhead Pass

=== Former National Historic Sites in Alberta ===
Name	Established	Disbanded	Notes
Cochrane Ranch National Historic Site	1968	1988	Deemed not of national historic significance.
Laggan Canadian Pacific Railroad Station National Historic Site		1976	The station was demolished, rebuilt at Heritage Park Historical Village.
Flying-E Ranch National Historic Site	1974	1988	Deemed not of national historic significance.

== See also ==
- History of Alberta
- List of historic places in Alberta
- Provincial historic sites of Alberta
