= List of historic places in Southern Alberta =

This article is a list of historic places in Southern Alberta entered on the Canadian Register of Historic Places, whether they are federal, provincial, or municipal.

== List ==
Name	Address	Coordinates	Government recognition (CRHP №)	Wikidata ID	Image
Blackfoot Crossing National Historic Site of Canada	Blackfoot Crossing; Siksika 146 AB	50°48′15″N 112°54′23″W	Federal (1165)		
Federal Building	704 4 Ave S Lethbridge AB	49°41′40″N 112°50′13″W	Federal (3092)		Upload Photo
Brooks Aqueduct	off the Trans-Canada Highway, southeast of Brooks; Newell County AB	50°31′54″N 111°50′17″W	Federal (17702), Alberta (2895)		More images
Canadian Pacific Railway Station Building	Railway Ave. and Center St. Empress AB	50°57′33″N 110°00′29″W	Federal (6703), Alberta (3191)		Upload Photo
Canadian Pacific Railway Station	402 North Railway St. Medicine Hat AB	50°02′23″N 110°40′18″W	Federal (9321)		
Canadian Pacific Langevin Number 1 and 2 Gas Wells	Cypress County AB	50°16′57″N 111°20′53″W	Alberta (5895)		Upload Photo
Hoodoos	Drumheller; Drumheller AB	51°22′51″N 112°32′02″W	Alberta (8813)	Q26381933	More images
United Grain Growers - Alberta Wheat Pool Grain Elevator Site Complex	near Rowley; Starland County AB	51°45′39″N 112°46′52″W	Alberta (8982)		
Searle Grain Company Grain Elevator Site Complex	near Rowley; Starland County AB	51°45′40″N 112°46′48″W	Alberta (8983)		
Gleichen Water Tower	Gleichen; Wheatland County AB	50°52′07″N 113°03′07″W	Alberta (9606)		More images
St. Ambrose Anglican Church	505 - 5 Street SE; Redcliff AB	50°04′23″N 110°46′55″W	Alberta (10482)		
Alberta Wheat Pool Grain Elevator and Bow Slope Stockyard	EID Historic Park, Scandia; Newell County AB	50°16′44″N 112°02′56″W	Alberta (11471)		
Atlas No. 3 Coal Mine National Historic Site of Canada	near East Coulee; Drumheller AB	51°19′47″N 112°28′59″W	Federal (11712), Alberta (8998)	Q4816792	More images
Alberta Provincial Police Building	7809 18th Avenue	49°38′5.719″N 114°30′5.098″W	Alberta (2890)	Q33212176	More images
Blairmore Courthouse	13427 20th Avenue	49°36′26.521″N 114°25′53.245″W	Alberta (2891)	Q33212436	More images
Old Coleman High School	7701 18th Avenue	49°38′5.3″N 114°30′10.8″W	Alberta (3007)	Q34204526	More images
Cardston Courthouse	89 - 3 Avenue SW; Cardston AB	49°11′57″N 113°18′14″W	Alberta (3051)		Upload Photo
C.O. Card House	337 Main Street; Cardston AB	49°11′54″N 113°18′07″W	Alberta (5743)		Upload Photo
Drewry House	near Cowley; Pincher Creek Municipal District No. 9 AB	49°36′16″N 114°07′16″W	Alberta (5890)		Upload Photo
Stirling Agricultural Village National Historic Site of Canada	4 Ave & 1 St; Stirling AB	49°30′00″N 112°31′01″W	Federal (7773)		More images
Hoyt Tipi Ring Site	west of Del Bonita; Cardston County AB	49°03′05″N 112°56′38″W	Alberta (8137)		Upload Photo
Noble Cultivators Retail Manufacturing Building	914 Highway Avenue; Nobleford AB		Alberta (8251)		Upload Photo
Magrath Canal	Magrath AB	49°24′14″N 112°52′12″W	Alberta (8355)		
Leitch (Passberg) Collieries	west of Burmis; Crowsnest Pass AB	49°33′32″N 114°19′19″W	Alberta (8746)	Q38528239	More images
Old Hillcrest Cemetery	Hillcrest	49°34′31.4″N 114°22′47.6″W	Alberta (8747)	Q34206129	More images
Latter Day Saints Park Avenue Chapel	4 Park Avenue; Raymond AB	49°27′40″N 112°39′43″W	Alberta (8760)		Upload Photo
Raymond Buddhist Church	35 Broadway Avenue; Raymond AB	49°27′38″N 112°39′43″W	Alberta (8773)		Upload Photo
Áísínai'pi National Historic Site of Canada	Writing-on-Stone Provincial Park; Warner County No. 5 AB	49°04′54″N 111°37′01″W	Federal (10424)		More images
Isolation Hospital	1920 - 7 Avenue South; Lethbridge AB		Alberta (10480)		Upload Photo
Cobblestone Manor	173 - 7 Avenue West; Cardston AB	49°11′32″N 113°18′22″W	Alberta (10934)		Upload Photo
Frank Slide		49°35′28″N 114°23′42″W	Alberta (11500)	Q820306	More images
Ross Archaeological Site	northeast of Coaldale; Lethbridge County AB	49°51′51″N 112°31′08″W	Alberta (11561)		Upload Photo
Coleman Union Hall / Hospital	7805 18th Avenue	49°38′5.680″N 114°30′5.663″W	Alberta (11844)	Q37777637	Upload Photo
Andreas Michelsen Farmstead	533 - 2 Avenue; Stirling AB	49°30′23″N 112°31′55″W	Alberta (11903)		More images
Coleman National Historic Site of Canada		49°38′7″N 114°30′11″W	Federal (11933)	Q5142969	More images
Temple of the Church of Jesus Christ of Latter Day Saints National Historic Site of Canada	348 Third Street West; Cardston AB	49°11′53″N 113°18′40″W	Federal (12645)		More images
Fort Macleod National Historic Site of Canada	Fort MacLeod AB	49°43′27″N 113°24′29″W	Federal (1140)		More images
Grier Block	2305/2311 - 2 Avenue; Fort MacLeod AB	49°43′30″N 113°24′32″W	Alberta (4944)		
Empress Theatre	235 - 24 Street; Fort MacLeod AB	49°43′32″N 113°24′29″W	Alberta (5891)		
Union Bank Building	163 - 23rd Street; Fort MacLeod AB	49°43′29″N 113°24′22″W	Alberta (18049)		Upload Photo
A.Y. Young Drug Store	210 - 24 Street; Fort MacLeod AB	49°43′31″N 113°24′29″W	Alberta (8789)		Upload Photo
Milnes Block	105, 107, 109 - 50 Avenue West, and 4925 / 4927 - 1 Street; Claresholm AB	50°01′34″N 113°34′55″W	Alberta (8805)		Upload Photo
Village of Lille	north of Blairmore; Ranchland Municipal District No. 66 AB	49°39′08″N 114°23′49″W	Alberta (11391)		Upload Photo
Hetherington Erratics Field	south of Fort MacLeod; Willow Creek Municipal District No. 26 AB	49°33′54″N 113°26′20″W	Alberta (11476)		Upload Photo
Circle L Ranch	west of Claresholm; Willow Creek Municipal District No. 26 AB	50°02′01″N 113°52′37″W	Alberta (11615)		Upload Photo
The Leavings at Willow Creek	north of Claresholm; Willow Creek Municipal District No. 26 AB	50°05′24″N 113°34′55″W	Alberta (11967)		Upload Photo
Canadian Pacific Railway Station	5126 1st Street W Claresholm AB	50°01′40″N 113°34′57″W	Alberta (5742)		Upload Photo
Former Canadian Northern Railway Station	Railway Avenue (between Centre St. and 1 St. W); Hanna AB	51°38′30″N 111°55′30″W	Federal (6708)		Upload Photo
Territorial Court House National Historic Site of Canada	236 23rd Street; Fort MacLeod AB	49°43′28″N 113°24′25″W	Federal (12566), Alberta (5917)		More images
Renwick Building	223 - 24 Street; Fort MacLeod AB	49°43′33″N 113°24′29″W	Alberta (13348)		
A.G.T. Building	232 - Centre Street; Vulcan AB	50°24′12″N 113°15′50″W	Vulcan municipality (13372)		Upload Photo
St. Anne Ranch	south of Trochu; Kneehill County AB	51°48′37″N 113°13′26″W	Alberta (9204)		Upload Photo
Cousins Residence	271 - 1 Street SE; Medicine Hat AB	50°02′21″N 110°41′02″W	Alberta (5916)		More images
Medicine Hat Courthouse	460 - 1 Street SE; Medicine Hat AB	50°02′27″N 110°40′48″W	Alberta (5918)		More images
Ewart-Duggan Residence	443 - 1 Street SE; Medicine Hat AB	50°02′24″N 110°40′48″W	Alberta (7515)		More images
Cypress Club	218 - 6 Avenue SE; Medicine Hat AB	50°02′24″N 110°40′34″W	Alberta (8486)		More images
Hycroft China Ltd. Factory	701 - 703 Wood Street; Medicine Hat AB	50°01′51″N 110°39′25″W	Alberta (11505)		More images
Medalta Potteries	713 Medalta Avenue; Medicine Hat AB	50°1′54″N 110°38′59″W	Federal (12132), Alberta (3444)	Q23706050	More images
St. Patrick's Roman Catholic Church National Historic Site of Canada	238 2nd Avenue; Medicine Hat AB	50°02′43″N 110°40′52″W	Federal (12913)		More images
Saamis Site	Medicine Hat AB	50°01′01″N 110°41′46″W	Alberta (11513)		Upload Photo
Canadian Imperial Bank of Commerce	577 2nd Street E Medicine Hat AB	50°02′26″N 110°40′36″W	Alberta (8761)		Upload Photo
Canadian Imperial Bank of Commerce	5227 48th Street W Taber AB	49°47′05″N 112°08′42″W	Alberta (8253)		Upload Photo
Conybeare Residence	422 - 6 Avenue South; Lethbridge AB	49°41′27″N 112°50′24″W	Alberta (2120)		Upload Photo
Bowman Arts Centre	811 - 5 Avenue South; Lethbridge AB	49°41′36″N 112°50′04″W	Alberta (2892)		
Chinese Free Masons Building	310 - 2 Avenue South; Lethbridge AB	49°41′47″N 112°50′35″W	Alberta (2893)		Upload Photo
Riverview C.A. Magrath House	109 - 7 Avenue South; Lethbridge AB	49°41′19″N 112°50′46″W	Alberta (5893), Lethbridge municipality (11074)		Upload Photo
Lethbridge Fire Hall No. 1	402 - 2 Avenue South; Lethbridge AB	49°41′47″N 112°50′31″W	Alberta (8083)		Upload Photo
Kuo Min Tang (Chinese National League) Building	309 - 2 Avenue South; Lethbridge AB	49°41′48″N 112°50′35″W	Alberta (8729)		Upload Photo
Dr. Arthur Haig Residence	1115 - 8 Avenue South; Lethbridge AB	49°41′18″N 112°49′44″W	Alberta (8785)		Upload Photo
W.D.L. Hardie Residence	1242 - 5 Avenue South; Lethbridge AB	49°41′35″N 112°49′34″W	Alberta (8786)		Upload Photo
Lethbridge Canadian Pacific Railway Station	801 - 1 Avenue South; Lethbridge AB	49°41′54″N 112°50′10″W	Alberta (11966)		Upload Photo
Duke of Sutherland Site Complex	east of Brooks; Newell County AB	50°34′21″N 111°50′17″W	Alberta (5138)		Upload Photo
Former Engineer's House	50 and 54 Evergreen Park Close; Brooks AB	50°33′56″N 111°54′14″W	Brooks municipality (11929)		Upload Photo
Registration Building	Waterton Lakes National Park; Waterton Improvement District No. 04 AB	49°05′00″N 113°52′01″W	Federal (3423)		More images
RCMP Detachment Building	202 Waterton Avenue, Waterton; Waterton Improvement District No. 04 AB	49°06′01″N 113°54′32″W	Federal (3601)		Upload Photo
RCMP Detachment Garage	Waterton Improvement District No. 04 AB	49°06′01″N 113°54′32″W	Federal (3602)		Upload Photo
First Oil Well in Western Canada National Historic Site	Akamina Parkway, Waterton Lakes National Park of Canada; Waterton Improvement District No. 04 AB	49°04′16″N 113°59′13″W	Federal (4210)		More images
Prince of Wales Hotel National Historic Site of Canada	Waterton Lakes National Park; Waterton Improvement District No. 04 AB	49°03′22″N 113°54′43″W	Federal (4307)		More images
Central Laboratory (B-1)	Canadian Forces Base Suffield / Base des Forces canadiennes de Suffield; Cypress County AB	50°27′40″N 110°44′35″W	Federal (9587)		Upload Photo
Ralston School (R2)	Ralston; AB	50°14′45.960″N 111°9′54.000″W	Federal (9626)	Q41282364	More images
Blood Indian Hospital	95 - 1 Avenue North; Cardston AB	49°12′00″N 113°18′00″W	Federal (9737)		Upload Photo
Comfort Station 1	Waterton; Waterton Improvement District No. 04 AB	49°03′03″N 113°54′32″W	Federal (10137)		Upload Photo
Comfort Station 2	Waterton; Waterton Improvement District No. 04 AB	49°02′53″N 113°54′32″W	Federal (10138)		Upload Photo
Comfort Station 6	Waterton; Waterton Improvement District No. 04 AB	49°02′52″N 113°54′43″W	Federal (10139)		Upload Photo
Comfort Station 8	Waterton; Waterton Improvement District No. 04 AB	49°02′49″N 113°54′43″W	Federal (10140)		Upload Photo
Comfort Station 9	Waterton; Waterton Improvement District No. 04 AB	49°02′39″N 113°54′54″W	Federal (10141)		Upload Photo
Interpretive Building	Waterton; Waterton Improvement District No. 04 AB	49°02′55″N 113°54′29″W	Federal (10146)		Upload Photo
Kitchen Shelter 7	Waterton; Waterton Improvement District No. 04 AB	49°02′42″N 113°54′54″W	Federal (10203)		Upload Photo
Kitchen Shelter 13	Waterton; Waterton Improvement District No. 04 AB	49°02′56″N 113°54′36″W	Federal (10204)		Upload Photo
Kitchen Shelter 1	Waterton; Waterton Improvement District No. 04 AB	49°02′51″N 113°54′32″W	Federal (10205)		Upload Photo
Kitchen Shelter 2	Waterton; Waterton Improvement District No. 04 AB	49°02′51″N 113°54′32″W	Federal (10206)		Upload Photo
Kitchen Shelter 6	Waterton; Waterton Improvement District No. 04 AB	49°02′42″N 113°54′50″W	Federal (10207)		Upload Photo
Kitchen Shelter 8	Waterton; Waterton Improvement District No. 04 AB	49°02′47″N 113°54′50″W	Federal (10208)		Upload Photo
Kitchen Shelter 9	Waterton; Waterton Improvement District No. 04 AB	49°02′48″N 113°54′50″W	Federal (10209)		Upload Photo
Kitchen Shelter 11	Waterton; Waterton Improvement District No. 04 AB	49°02′56″N 113°54′40″W	Federal (10210)		Upload Photo
Kitchen Shelter 14	Waterton; Waterton Improvement District No. 04 AB	49°02′55″N 113°54′32″W	Federal (10211)		Upload Photo
Laidlaw Antelope Trap	near Bow Island; Forty Mile County No. 8 AB		Alberta (10861)		Upload Photo
Fort Whoop-Up Archaeological Site	Junction of the St. Mary and Oldman Rivers; Lethbridge AB	49°37′34″N 112°53′17″W	Federal (18984), Alberta (10972)		Upload Photo
Ward Effigy Archaeological Site	northeast of Cluny; Wheatland County AB		Alberta (11403)		Upload Photo
Dinosaur Egg Site	west of Warner; Warner County No. 5 AB		Alberta (11518)		Upload Photo
Sir Alexander Galt Hospital	502 - 1 Street South; Lethbridge AB	49°41′32″N 112°50′49″W	Alberta (11623)		Upload Photo
Medicine Hat Clay Industries National Historic Site of Canada	703 Wood Street SE; Medicine Hat AB	50°01′53″N 110°38′53″W	Federal (12133)		Upload Photo
British Block Cairn National Historic Site of Canada	Cypress County AB	50°36′30″N 110°35′32″W	Federal (14944)		More images
Crowsnest Pass Polish Hall	1406 82nd Street	49°37′54.314″N 114°29′49.484″W	Alberta (15493)	Q37777699	More images
Majorville Cairn and Medicine Wheel site	near Bassano; Vulcan County AB		Alberta (15835)		Upload Photo
Treaty Nº 7 Signing Site National Historic Site of Canada	Siksika Indian Reserve #146 AB	50°47′12″N 112°53′42″W	Federal (15908)		More images
Suffield Tipi Rings National Historic Site of Canada	Cypress County; Cypress County AB	50°12′00″N 111°10′01″W	Federal (16001)		Upload Photo
Doukhobor Prayer Home	753 Kettles Street, Lundbreck; Pincher Creek Municipal District No. 9 AB	49°35′03″N 114°09′43″W	Alberta (16362)		Upload Photo
Acadia Block	614 (616) 3 Avenue South; Lethbridge AB	49°41′44″N 112°50′17″W	Lethbridge municipality (17904)		
R.T. Barker Building	232 - 24 Street; Fort MacLeod AB	49°43′31″N 113°24′29″W	Alberta (18050)		Upload Photo
Sunnyslope Sandstone Shelter	near Didsbury; Kneehill County AB	51°40′18″N 113°36′54″W	Alberta (18051)		More images
West Canadian Collieries Mine		49°34′37.873″N 114°21′53.939″W	Alberta (18807)	Q38530898	More images
Lethbridge Manual Training School	811 - 5 Avenue South; Lethbridge AB	49°41′36″N 112°50′10″W	Alberta (18864)		Upload Photo
Earthlodge Village National Historic Site of Canada	Siksika Indian Reserve #146 AB		Federal (19552)		More images

== See also ==
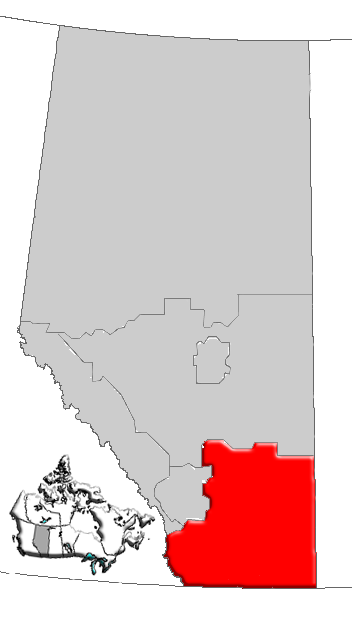
