= Raymond Community Centre =

Building in Raymond, Alberta, Canada

The Raymond Community Centre is a prominent building in Raymond, Alberta, Canada, that currently houses the Broadway Theatre and the Raymond Public Library. Until 1987, the building was a meetinghouse of the Church of Jesus Christ of Latter-day Saints (LDS Church) and was known as the Park Avenue Chapel and by locals as the "Second Ward Church" or the "Brown Church".

The building was designed by architect Francis Bent Rolfson and was begun in 1928. At the time the LDS Church owned had a meetinghouse in Raymond, but its membership had grown so large so as to require a second meetinghouse. The building has a Y-configuration with a central rotunda; it was completed in 1939 and was dedicated as an LDS Church meetinghouse on 5 November 1939.

In 1987, the LDS Church sold the building to the Town of Raymond. Extensive renovations were conducted and the building was opened as the Raymond Community Centre on 1 June 1996. The Community Centre houses the Broadway Theatre, the Raymond Public Library and offices for several businesses. Raymond's town hall was also housed in the building until 2019.

In 1989, the building was designated as a Provincial Historic Resource and listed on the Alberta Register of Historic Places as the Latter Day Saints Park Avenue Chapel. It is located on the corner of Broadway and Park Avenue. A "twin" building in Provo, Utah, was built using the same design.
