= Raymond Buddhist Church =

Building in Alberta, Canada

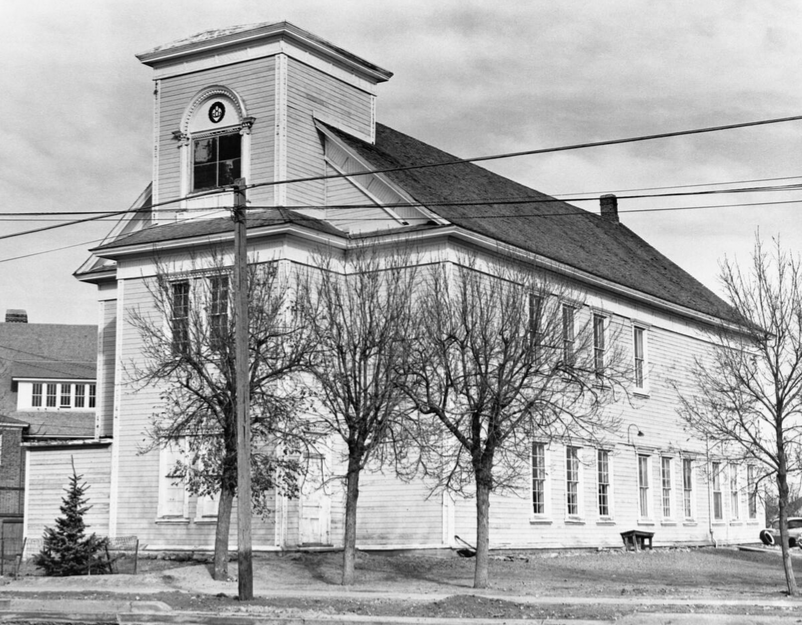
- Raymond Buddhist Church c. 1960

Religion
- Affiliation: Jōdo Shinshū Buddhism (formerly), Latter-day Saint (formerly)

Location
- Location: Raymond, Alberta, Canada
- Interactive map of Raymond Buddhist Church

Architecture
- Completed: 1903

The Raymond Buddhist Church is a building in Raymond, Alberta, Canada that has been a schoolhouse, a Jōdo Shinshū Buddhist temple, and a meetinghouse of the Church of Jesus Christ of Latter-day Saints (LDS Church). Until it closed in 2006, it was the oldest continuously used Buddhist shrine in Canada.

== Early uses ==
Construction on the building was begun in 1902 and the building was completed in 1903. It was built by Latter-day Saint settlers of Raymond and was initially used as the settlement's first schoolhouse. It was also used as the meetinghouse for the LDS Church and for other community events. In 1910, the school moved to a larger facility and in 1929 the LDS Church completed a larger meetinghouse.

== Buddhist temple ==
In 1929, Japanese Canadian members of the Jōdo Shinshū Buddhist faith purchased the building to use a temple, schoolhouse, and meeting place. It was the first Buddhist temple to be established in Alberta. Beginning in 1932, a co-operative store known as the "Kobai Kumiai" also operated out of the building. The store operated until the 1990s and the temple functioned until 2006, when the temple's altar and ornamentation was moved to a Buddhist temple in Lethbridge, Alberta. In 1988, the Raymond Buddhist Church was described as "one of the finest [Buddhist] shrines in North America."

== Architecture and historical value ==
The architecture of the building has been described as "typical of the kinds of public buildings erected in early 1900s Alberta". It is the oldest building in Raymond and in 1984 was added to the Alberta Register of Historic Places.
