= Raymond, Alberta =

Municipality in Alberta, Canada (est. 1901)

Raymond
- Town
- Town of Raymond
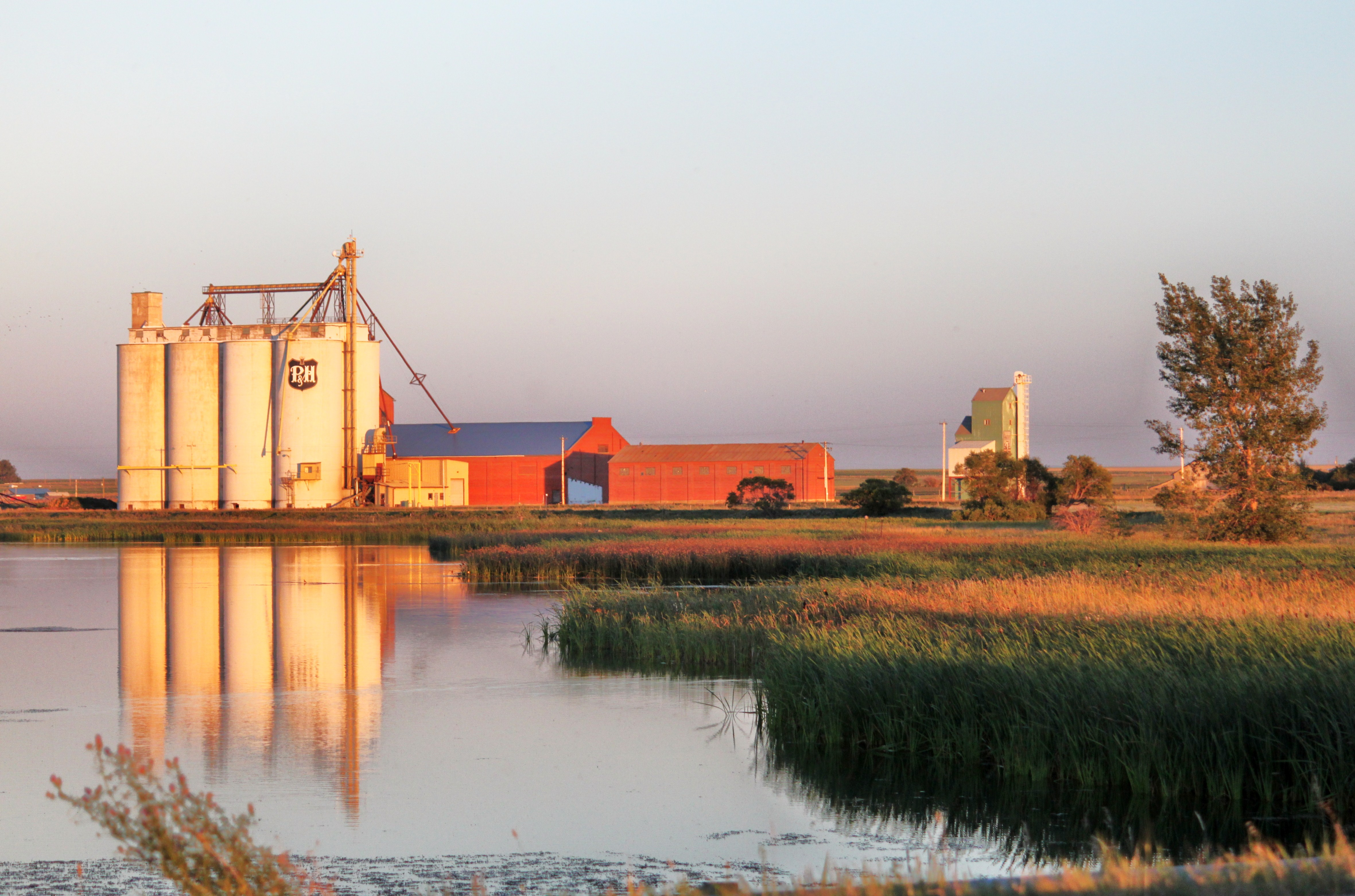
- Former sugar beet processing factory, converted into a grain elevator when acquired by Parrish & Heimbecker
- Nickname: Sugar City
- Motto: Home of the First Stampede
- Location of Raymond in Alberta
- Coordinates: 49°27′57″N 112°39′03″W
- Country: Canada
- Province: Alberta
- Region: Southern Alberta
- Census division: 2
- Municipal district: County of Warner No. 5
- Incorporated
  - Village: May 30, 1902
  - Town: July 1, 1903

Government
  - Mayor: Bryce Coppieters
  - Governing body: Raymond Town Council: Kate Kindt; Brian Eakett; Matt Evans; Wayne Johnson; Neil Sieben; Pam Stewart

Area (2021)
  - Land: 7.63 km^{2} (2.95 sq mi)
- Elevation: 960 m (3,150 ft)

Population (2021)
  - Total: 4,199
  - Density: 550.2/km^{2} (1,425/sq mi)
  - Municipal census (2019): 4,241
- Time zone: UTC−06:00 (Alberta Time)
- Postal code: T0K 2S0
- Area code: 403, 587, 825
- Highways: Highway 52; Highway 845
- Waterways: Milk River Ridge Reservoir
- Website: Official website

Raymond is a town in southern Alberta, Canada that is surrounded by the County of Warner No. 5. It is south of Lethbridge at the junction of Highway 52 and Highway 845. Raymond is known for its annual rodeo during the first week of July and the large population of members of the Church of Jesus Christ of Latter-day Saints (LDS Church). Raymond is also significant for its connection to the history of the Japanese experience in Alberta. The town has a rich history in high school sports, basketball, Canadian football, school band programs, judo and women's rugby. Raymond was recently mentioned as one of the first communities in Alberta to become a net-zero solar-powered community, after having installed solar panels on most town buildings.

== History ==
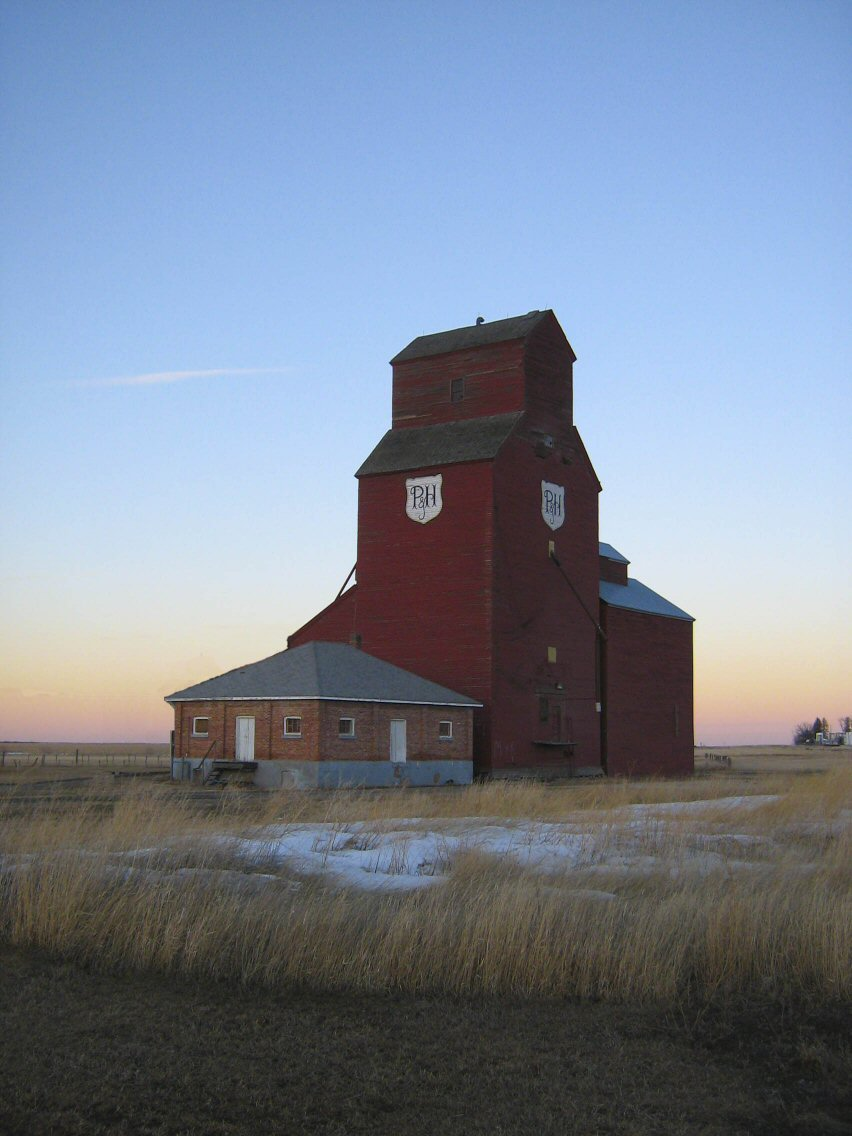
Raymond's last historic grain elevator. Demolished 2009

Raymond was founded in 1901 by mining magnate and industrialist Jesse Knight, who named the town after his son, Raymond. Knight's plans to build a sugar factory based on locally grown sugar beets attracted 1,500 settlers in a few years.

Raymond was incorporated as a village in the North-West Territories (NWT) on May 30, 1902. It incorporated as a town in the NWT 13 months later on July 1, 1903.

== Demographics ==
In the 2021 Census of Population conducted by Statistics Canada, the Town of Raymond had a population of 4,199 living in 1,330 of its 1,383 total private dwellings, a change of 13.1% from its 2016 population of 3,713. With a land area of 7.63 km^{2} (2.95 sq mi), it had a population density of 550.3/km^{2} (1,425.3/sq mi) in 2021.

The population of the Town of Raymond according to its 2019 municipal census is 4,241, a 5.1% change from its 2017 municipal census population of 4,037.

In the 2016 Census of Population conducted by Statistics Canada, the Town of Raymond recorded a population of 3,708 living in 1,134 of its 1,259 total private dwellings, a −0.9% change from its 2011 population of 3,743. With a land area of 6.66 km^{2} (2.57 sq mi), it had a population density of 556.8/km^{2} (1,442.0/sq mi) in 2016.

=== Visible minorities ===
As of 2006, approximately 3.0% of the town's population were visible minorities. Of those minorities, 50 people identified themselves as Japanese, 40 as Black, and 10 as South Asian.

=== Religion ===
A majority of Raymondites are members of the LDS Church. In the town, the church has built four meetinghouses, which house eleven separate congregations and which form one stake. The church's closest temple, the Cardston Alberta Temple, is located 60 kilometres (37 mi) southwest in Cardston. Raymond also has Baptist, Mennonite, and United Church of Canada congregations. Until its temple was relocated to Lethbridge in 2006, the Raymond Buddhist Church was the oldest continually used Buddhist sanctuary in Canada.

=== Charitable giving ===
Statistics Canada has reported that Raymond ranks among the top five communities in Canada for the highest level of charitable donations per capita, which is partially due to the town population's high rate of tithes given to the LDS Church.

== Attractions ==
In 1902, one year after it was founded, Raymond held an outdoor rodeo and called it a stampede; this was Canada's first organized rodeo event. Since the inaugural event, the Raymond Stampede has been held annually. It is currently held in conjunction with Raymond's Heritage Days celebration between June 30 and July 1 every summer.

Raymond Heritage Days are held annually during the first week of July to celebrate the founding of Raymond. Events and activities include family softball, fireworks, midnight golfing, a fair, a pancake breakfast, a parade and the Raymond Stampede.

Raymond is home to the Raymond Judo Club, the first judo club in Alberta. The club was formed by Yoshio Katsuta in 1943.

The Raymond Aquatic Centre opened in 2010. It features two small waterslides, a junior Olympic-sized pool for lane swimming, diving boards, a climbing wall, a baby pool, and an eating area. The aquatic centre holds 1,000,000 litres of water during the summer and attracts up to 500 visitors a day.

The Raymond Buddhist Church is one of the oldest buildings in Raymond and the only remaining public building from the town's pioneer days. The building is a designated Provincial Historic Resource. It is significant for its association with two prominent religious communities in Raymond, the LDS Church and the Japanese Buddhists. It is also the site of the Japanese Experience in Alberta National Historic Event.

The Raymond Community Centre, also a designated Provincial Historic Resource, contains the Raymond Public Library and the Broadway Theatre.

== Climate ==
Raymond has a semi-arid climate (Köppen climate classification BSk) it is part of the Palliser's Triangle. Raymond is very windy this is due to the rocky mountains to the west.

Climate data for Raymond AGDM, 2016 normals, extremes 2016
Month	Jan	Feb	Mar	Apr	May	Jun	Jul	Aug	Sep	Oct	Nov	Dec	Year
Record high °C (°F)	13.7 (56.7)	18.0 (64.4)	20.5 (68.9)	26.9 (80.4)	28.4 (83.1)	29.5 (85.1)	30.2 (86.4)	31.3 (88.3)	28.4 (83.1)	17.7 (63.9)	23.7 (74.7)	6.7 (44.1)	31.3 (88.3)
Mean daily maximum °C (°F)	1.5 (34.7)	9.0 (48.2)	11.4 (52.5)	16.0 (60.8)	17.3 (63.1)	23.1 (73.6)	25.5 (77.9)	24.2 (75.6)	19.6 (67.3)	11.3 (52.3)	11.2 (52.2)	−5.1 (22.8)	13.8 (56.8)
Daily mean °C (°F)	−3.8 (25.2)	2.8 (37.0)	4.8 (40.6)	9.1 (48.4)	10.9 (51.6)	15.5 (59.9)	18.1 (64.6)	16.9 (62.4)	12.6 (54.7)	5.6 (42.1)	5.2 (41.4)	−10.3 (13.5)	7.3 (45.1)
Mean daily minimum °C (°F)	−10.1 (13.8)	−3.5 (25.7)	−1.7 (28.9)	2.3 (36.1)	4.4 (39.9)	8.4 (47.1)	10.5 (50.9)	9.7 (49.5)	5.8 (42.4)	−0.1 (31.8)	−1.3 (29.7)	−15.6 (3.9)	0.7 (33.3)
Record low °C (°F)	−30.7 (−23.3)	−12.2 (10.0)	−7.6 (18.3)	−4.4 (24.1)	−0.4 (31.3)	1.5 (34.7)	4.1 (39.4)	3.5 (38.3)	0.3 (32.5)	−10.1 (13.8)	−12.8 (9.0)	−30.4 (−22.7)	−30.7 (−23.3)
Average precipitation mm (inches)	7.9 (0.31)	0.9 (0.04)	18.0 (0.71)	30.2 (1.19)	76.6 (3.02)	26.3 (1.04)	64.2 (2.53)	38.1 (1.50)	23.3 (0.92)	17.9 (0.70)	2.4 (0.09)	13.9 (0.55)	319.7 (12.59)
Source: Environment Canada

== Notable people ==
- Earl W. Bascom, rodeo innovator, artist/sculptor
- Ted E. Brewerton, LDS Church general authority
- "Suicide Ted" Elder (1897–1981), seven-time World Champion Trick and Fancy Rider 1926 to 1932
- Lloyd Fairbanks, professional football player
- Skouson Harker, professional basketball player
- Jim Hillyer, politician, Member of Parliament
- Jennie B. Knight, LDS religious leader
- Raymond Knight, founder of the Raymond Stampede
- Brett Ralph, professional Canadian football player
- Brock Ralph, professional Canadian football player
- W. Cleon Skousen, author and political commentator
- Phil Tollestrup, Olympics basketball player and member of the Canadian Basketball Hall of Fame
- William R. Walker, LDS Church general authority
- Wendy Watson Nelson, therapist, professor, author

== See also ==
- List of communities in Alberta
- List of towns in Alberta
- Temple Hill (Warner County, Alberta)
- John W. Taylor
