= Norman Bethune Sanson =

Norman Bethune Sanson (1862–1949) was the curator of the Banff Park Museum in Banff, Alberta from 1896 to 1932. Sanson traveled extensively through Banff, Yoho and Kootenay National Parks to collect specimens for the museum, and continued to volunteer for the museum for fifteen years after his retirement.

Sanson was born in Toronto in 1862, the son of a clergyman. He traveled to the Canadian West with the Queen's Own Rifles, who were involved in the suppression of the North-West Rebellion of 1885. Finding employment as a bookkeeper at the Mount Brett sanatorium he became acquainted with a Mr. McLeod who was curator of the museum and the park meteorologist. Sanson took over McLeod's work on McLeod's death in 1896. In addition to his work at the Park Museum, he was a zookeeper at the Banff Zoo, established in 1905 on the grounds behind the Museum.

In 1931 Sanson accompanied the King and Queen of Siam to the top of Sulphur Mountain. He accompanied King George VI to the top of Tunnel Mountain in 1939. Sanson remained active in the Banff community after his retirement, organizing snowshoeing expeditions and traveling extensively in North America and Europe, hiking in Britain and Europe.

Sanson was in charge of the weather station on Sanson Peak, built there at his suggestion in 1903. The peak was named in his honor in 1948. Sanson made more than 1000 trips to the peak in his capacity as park meteorologist until 1945, when he was 84 years old. Sanson's reports were published in the Banff newspaper under the pseudonym "Seer Altitudinous."

Sanson was a member of the Alpine Club of Canada and was the first president of the Skyline Hikers of the Canadian Rockies. He was active with St. George's Anglican Church in Banff and supported the Canadian Bible Society.
