= Banff Park Museum =

Natural history museum in Banff, Canada

Coordinates: 51°10′25.57″N 115°34′17.9″W

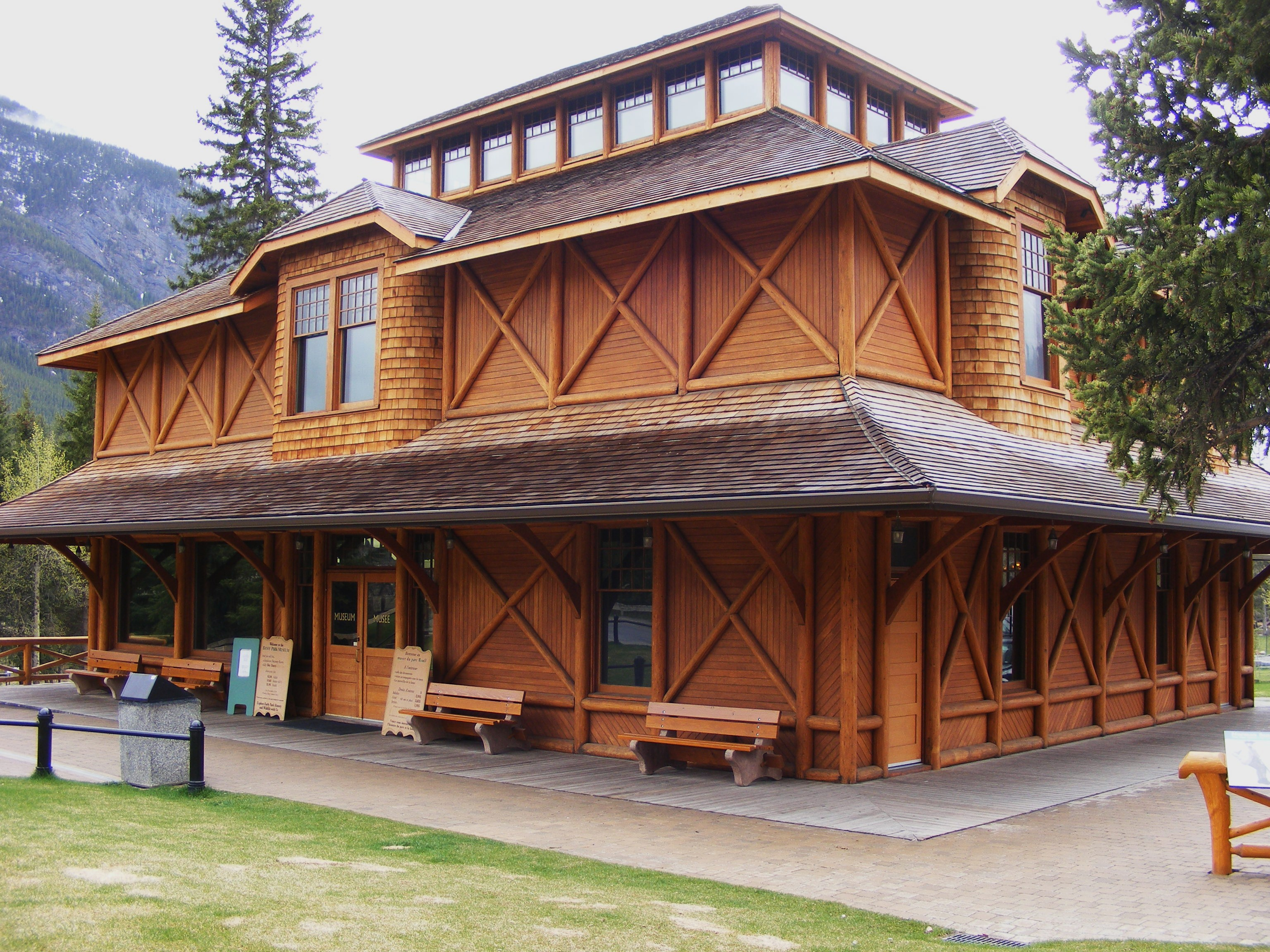
- Banff Park Museum exterior
- Interactive map of Banff Park Museum
- Location: Banff, Alberta, Canada

History
- Established: 1895
- Founder: Natural History Branch, Geological Survey of Canada
- Built: 1903

Site notes
- Architect: John Stocks
- Architectural style: Rustic
- Governing body: Parks Canada
- Website: parks.canada.ca/lhn-nhs/ab/banff/

National Historic Site of Canada
- Designated: 1985

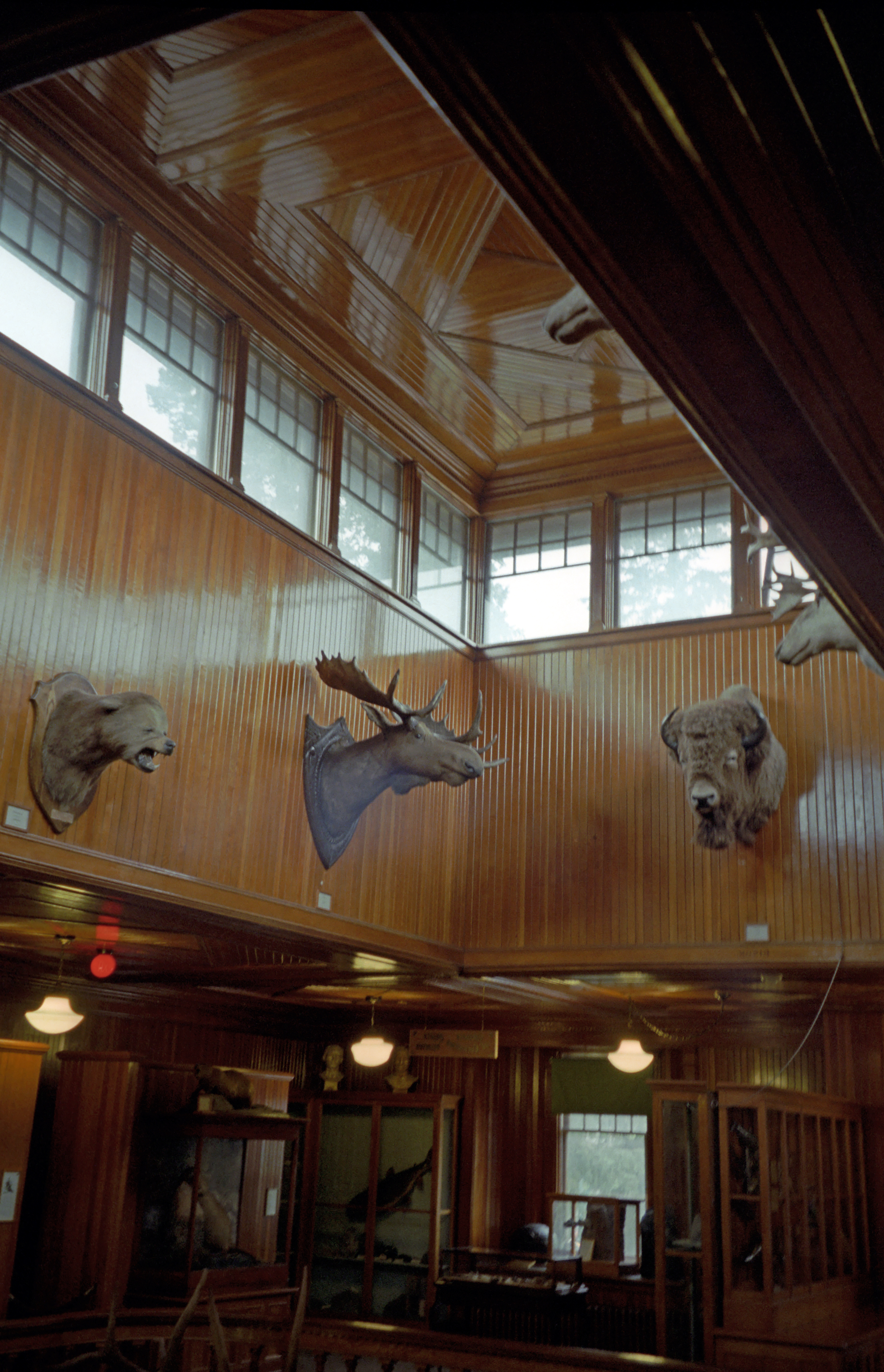
Museum interior

The Banff Park Museum National Historic Site, located in downtown Banff, Alberta, is an exhibition space associated with Banff National Park.

The oldest building maintained by Parks Canada, the museum was declared a National Historic Site of Canada in 1985 and was classified as historic structure the following year. The museum building is a pioneering example of the rustic style of architecture that was starting to catch on in North-American parks.

== History ==
The museum was established in 1895 to house an exhibit of taxidermy mounted specimens of animals, plants and minerals associated with Banff National Park. It was built in 1903 to the design of territory government engineer John Stocks.

In 1896, Norman Bethune Sanson was hired as the museum curator. Serving until 1932, Sanson was responsible for expanding the collection from eight mammals, 259 birds, a turtle and a variety of mineral and botanical specimens to the present collection of 5000 specimens. The building, described as a "railway pagoda", uses exposed log framing and rustic detailing.

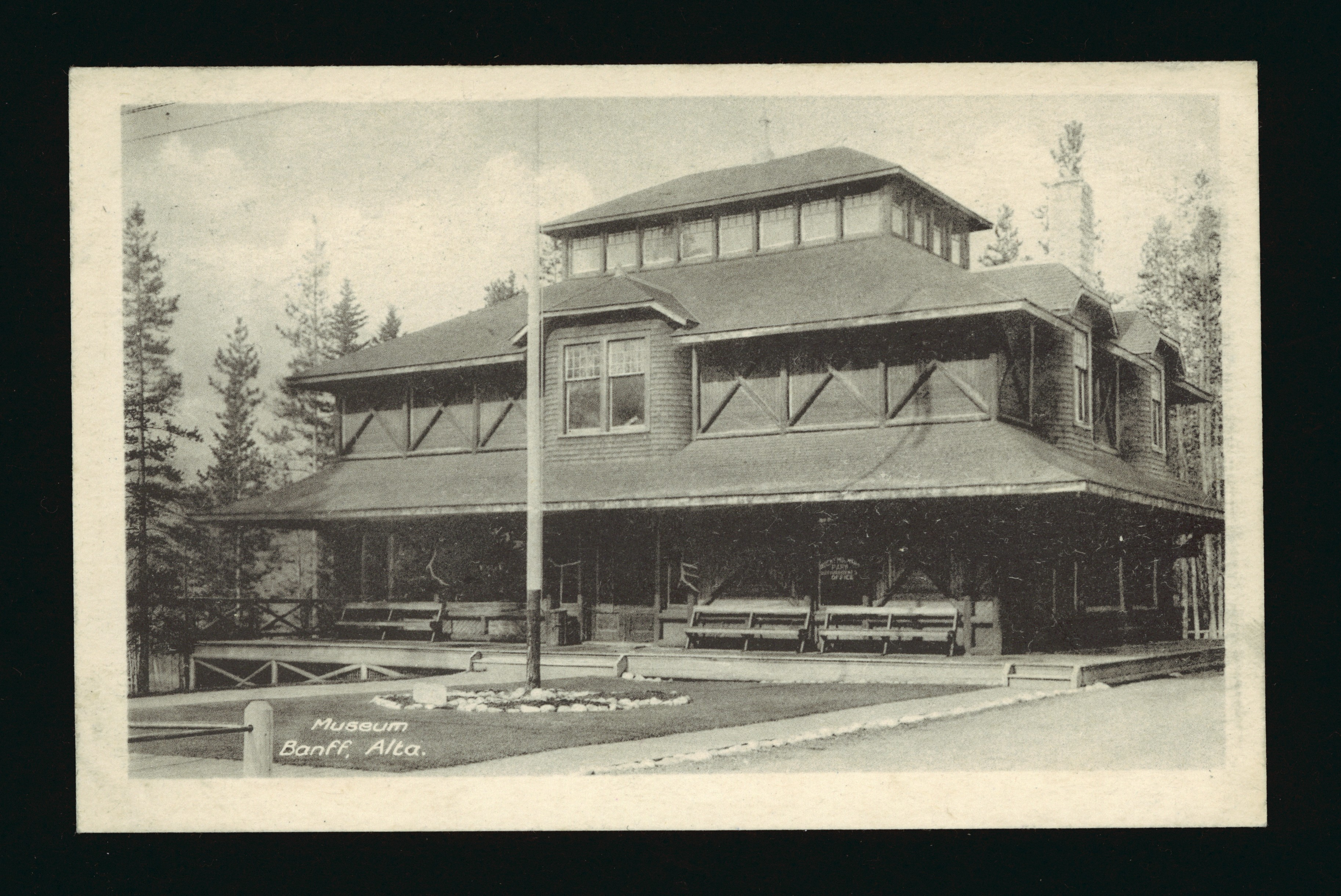
A view of the Banff Park exterior taken in the 1920s.

From 1905 to 1937 a small zoo operated on the grounds to the rear of the museum, featuring a small collection of animals, many of which were exotic or non-native. At its peak in 1914 there were 36 birds in an aviary and 50 mammals. The zoo declined in the 1930s, was closed in 1937, and was demolished in 1939. Forty-six animals were donated to the Calgary Zoo at the Banff Zoo's closing, including wolves, lynx, and black, cinnamon and polar bears.

The property was fully restored in 2010, by a local contracting company out of Calgary, AB. The exterior was restored from heavy oil products to an eco-friendly clear coating to protect and enhance the wood structure.
