= List of historic places in Alberta =

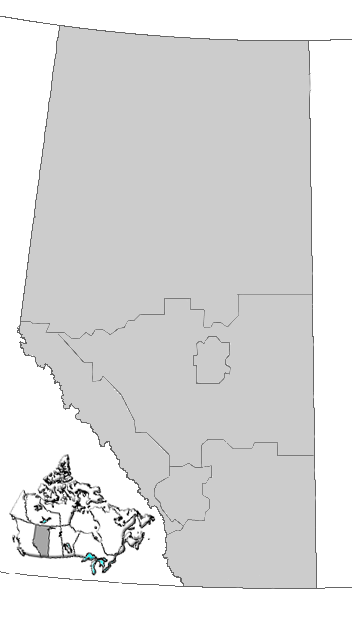

This article is a list of historic places in the province of Alberta entered on the Canadian Register of Historic Places, whether they are federal, provincial, or municipal. The listings are divided by region.

- List of historic places in Alberta's Rockies
- List of historic places in the Calgary Region
- List of historic places in Central Alberta
- List of historic places in the Edmonton Metropolitan Region
- List of historic places in Northern Alberta
- List of historic places in Southern Alberta

== See also ==
- List of National Historic Sites of Canada in Alberta
