= List of historic places in the Calgary Region =

This article is a list of historic places in the Calgary Region, in Alberta, which have been entered into the national Register of Historic Places, which includes federal, provincial, and municipal properties. A few are in the national park system.

== List ==
Name	Address	Coordinates	Government recognition (CRHP №)	Wikidata ID	Image
Beaulieu National Historic Site (Lougheed House)	707 13th Avenue SW; Calgary AB	51°02′25″N 114°04′37″W	Federal (1162), Alberta (5147)		More images
E.P. Ranch	RR 2, High River; Foothills Municipal District No. 31 AB	50°24′29″N 114°16′59″W	Alberta (1171)		
Lougheed Block	604 - 1 Street SW; Calgary AB	51°03′01″N 114°03′54″W	Alberta (8984), Calgary municipality (1528)		More images
Victoria Sandstone School	411 - 11 Avenue SE; Calgary AB	51°02′32″N 114°03′14″W	Calgary municipality (2100)		
Hay Shed	Bar U Ranch; Foothills Municipal District No. 31 AB	50°25′15″N 114°14′45″W	Federal (2934)		More images
Implement Shed	Bar U Ranch; Foothills Municipal District No. 31 AB	50°25′09″N 114°15′05″W	Federal (2935)		
Livestock Shed	Bar U Ranch; Foothills Municipal District No. 31 AB	50°25′25″N 114°14′40″W	Federal (2942)		Upload Photo
Percheron Box Stalls	Bar U Ranch; Foothills Municipal District No. 31 AB	50°25′19″N 114°14′58″W	Federal (2944)		More images
Piggery	Bar U Ranch; Foothills Municipal District No. 31 AB	50°25′25″N 114°14′39″W	Federal (2945)		Upload Photo
Post Office, Building 5	Bar U Ranch; Foothills Municipal District No. 31 AB	50°25′10″N 114°14′50″W	Federal (2946)		More images
Poultry Shed, Building 21A	Bar U Ranch; Foothills Municipal District No. 31 AB		Federal (2947)		Upload Photo
Poultry Building 21	Bar U Ranch; Foothills Municipal District No. 31 AB	50°25′16″N 114°15′14″W	Federal (2948)		Upload Photo
Privy, Building 28	Bar U Ranch; Foothills Municipal District No. 31 AB	50°25′16″N 114°14′52″W	Federal (2949)		
Root Cellar, Building 13	Bar U Ranch; Foothills Municipal District No. 31 AB	50°25′08″N 114°14′58″W	Federal (2950)		More images
Saddle Horse Barn, Building 16	Bar U Ranch; Foothills Municipal District No. 31 AB	50°25′10″N 114°15′03″W	Federal (2952)		More images
Self Feeder, former Bunkhouse, Building 30	Bar U Ranch; Foothills Municipal District No. 31 AB	50°25′22″N 114°14′40″W	Federal (2955)		Upload Photo
Abattoir	Bar U Ranch; Foothills Municipal District No. 31 AB	50°25′17″N 114°14′51″W	Federal (2956)		Upload Photo
Storage Building 10	Bar U Ranch; Foothills Municipal District No. 31 AB	50°25′11″N 114°14′57″W	Federal (2957)		More images
Storage Building 8	Bar U Ranch; Foothills Municipal District No. 31 AB	50°25′11″N 114°14′57″W	Federal (2958)		More images
Coal Shed	Bar U Ranch; Foothills Municipal District No. 31 AB	50°25′09″N 114°14′58″W	Federal (3097)		
Dairy Barn	Bar U Ranch; Foothills Municipal District No. 31 AB	50°25′13″N 114°15′01″W	Federal (3107)		More images
Feed Mill	Bar U Ranch; Foothills Municipal District No. 31 AB	50°25′12″N 114°14′45″W	Federal (3116)		More images
Pearson's House	Bar U Ranch; Foothills Municipal District No. 31 AB	50°25′12″N 114°15′17″W	Federal (3117)		Upload Photo
Foreman's House	Bar U Ranch; Foothills Municipal District No. 31 AB		Federal (3118)		More images
Harness Shop	Bar U Ranch; Foothills Municipal District No. 31 AB	50°25′10″N 114°14′51″W	Federal (3119)		More images
Blacksmith Shop	Bar U Ranch; Foothills Municipal District No. 31 AB	50°25′09″N 114°15′00″W	Federal (3120)		More images
Bunkhouse and Cookhouse	Bar U Ranch; Foothills Municipal District No. 31 AB	50°25′10″N 114°14′58″W	Federal (3121)		More images
Storage Building 9	Bar U Ranch; Foothills Municipal District No. 31 AB	50°25′11″N 114°14′57″W	Federal (3123)		More images
Stud Horse Barn, Building 1	Bar U Ranch; Foothills Municipal District No. 31 AB	50°25′14″N 114°14′45″W	Federal (3125)		More images
Tractor Garage, Building 7	Bar U Ranch; Foothills Municipal District No. 31 AB	50°25′09″N 114°14′52″W	Federal (3127)		More images
Vehicle Garage, Building 35	Bar U Ranch; Foothills Municipal District No. 31 AB		Federal (3128)		Upload Photo
Vehicle Garage, Building 24	Bar U Ranch; Foothills Municipal District No. 31 AB		Federal (3129)		Upload Photo
Work Horse Barn, Building 17	Bar U Ranch; Foothills Municipal District No. 31 AB	50°25′10″N 114°15′05″W	Federal (3130)		More images
Calgary Milling Company Building	119 - 8 Avenue SW; Calgary AB	51°02′44″N 114°03′50″W	Alberta (3193), Calgary municipality (9279)		
Dr. Crawford Residence	636 Elbow Drive SW; Calgary AB	51°01′44″N 114°04′34″W	Alberta (3441)		Upload Photo
National Hotel	1043 - 10 Avenue SE; Calgary AB	51°02′29″N 114°02′13″W	Alberta (3637)		
Alequiers	west of Longview; Foothills Municipal District No. 31 AB	50°30′49″N 114°23′38″W	Alberta (4995)		Upload Photo
Anderson Apartments	804 - 18 Avenue SW; Calgary AB	51°02′14″N 114°04′37″W	Alberta (5098)		More images
Burns Building	237 - 8 Avenue SE; Calgary AB	51°02′44″N 114°03′29″W	Alberta (5101)		More images
Haultain School	225 - 13 Avenue SW; Calgary AB	51°02′25″N 114°04′05″W	Alberta (5104)		More images
North-West Travellers Building	515 - 1 Street SE; Calgary AB	51°02′52″N 114°03′36″W	Alberta (5108)		
St. Patrick's Roman Catholic Church	14608 Macleod Trail; Calgary AB	50°55′20″N 114°04′16″W	Alberta (5149)		
Hillhurst Cottage School	455 - 12 Avenue NW; Calgary AB	51°03′22″N 114°05′31″W	Alberta (5181)		
John Snow Residence and Studio	915 - 18 Avenue SW; Calgary AB	51°02′12″N 114°04′59″W	Alberta (5182)		More images
Knox United Church	506 - 4 Street SW; Calgary AB	51°02′51″N 114°04′16″W	Alberta (5183)		More images
William Roper Hull Ranche House	15979 Bow Bottom Trail SE; Calgary AB	50°54′36″N 114°01′16″W	Alberta (5111)		More images
A.E. Cross House	1240 - 8 Avenue SE; Calgary AB	51°02′32″N 114°02′02″W	Alberta (5133)		More images
Bank of Nova Scotia	125 - 8 Avenue SW; Calgary AB	51°02′42″N 114°03′54″W	Alberta (5134)		More images
Colonel James Walker House	Inglewood Bird Sanctuary; Calgary AB	51°01′35″N 114°00′36″W	Alberta (5137)		
Hunt House (H.B.C. Log Cabin)	806 - 9 Avenue SE, Calgary AB	51°02′43″N 114°02′35″W	Alberta (5140)		More images
Major John Stewart House	26 New Street SE; Calgary AB	51°02′30″N 114°01′44″W	Alberta (5141)		Upload Photo
Nellie McClung House	803 - 15 Avenue SW; Calgary AB	51°02′19″N 114°04′44″W	Alberta (5144)		More images
Old Y.W.C.A. Building	223 - 12 Avenue SW; Calgary AB	51°02′29″N 114°04′05″W	Alberta (5145)		More images
Royal Canadian Legion Calgary (Alberta No. 1) Branch	116 - 7 Avenue SE; Calgary AB	51°02′47″N 114°03′43″W	Alberta (5146)		More images
Thomson Brothers Block	112 - 8 Avenue SE; Calgary AB	51°02′48″N 114°03′47″W	Alberta (5150)		More images
Devenish Apartments	904 to 908 - 17 Avenue SW; Calgary AB	51°02′19″N 114°04′44″W	Alberta (5179)		
Lacombe House	14502 Macleod Trail South; Calgary AB	50°55′23″N 114°04′01″W	Alberta (5256)		Upload Photo
Battalion Numbers	2972 Signal Hill Dr SW; Calgary AB	51°01′17″N 114°04′16″W	Alberta (5724)		
Rutledge Hangar	731 - 13 Avenue NE; Calgary AB	51°03′49″N 114°02′53″W	Alberta (5725)		
Canada Life Assurance Building	301 - 8 Avenue SW; Calgary AB	51°02′44″N 114°04′05″W	Alberta (5741)		More images
Clark Residence, The	725 Macleod Trail; High River AB	50°34′36″N 113°52′59″W	Alberta (6563)		
Museum of the Highwood	401 - 1 Street West; High River AB	50°34′45″N 113°52′19″W	High River municipality (6564)		
Calgary City Hall	700 Macleod Trail SE; Calgary AB	51°02′46″N 114°03′29″W	Federal (7562), Alberta (8981), Calgary municipality (9289)		More images
Turner Valley Gas Plant National Historic Site	Sunset Boulevard SE; Turner Valley AB	50°40′22″N 114°16′52″W	Federal (7749), Alberta (15532)		
Stephen Avenue National Historic Site	8th Avenue; Calgary AB	51°02′44″N 114°03′50″W	Federal (7774)		More images
Reader Rock Garden National Historic Site	Macleod Trail South and 25 Avenue SE; Calgary AB	51°01′48″N 114°03′18″W	Alberta (7915)		More images
Cathedral Church of the Redeemer	210 - 7 Avenue SE; Calgary AB	51°02′48″N 114°03′40″W	Alberta (8039)		
Palace Theatre	219 - 8 Avenue SW; Calgary AB	51°02′45″N 114°03′58″W	Federal (14221), Alberta (8040)		
Imperial Bank of Canada	102 - 8 Avenue SE; Calgary AB	51°02′45″N 114°03′47″W	Alberta (8081)		
Calgary Cattle Company Building	117 - 8 Avenue SW; Calgary AB	51°02′45″N 114°03′50″W	Alberta (8082), Calgary municipality (9282)		
Bank of Montreal Building	140 - 8 Avenue SW; Calgary AB	51°02′44″N 114°03′50″W	Alberta (8354)		More images
Customs Examining Warehouse	134 - 11 Avenue SE; Calgary AB	51°02′32″N 114°03′40″W	Alberta (8403)		More images
Lorraine Block	620 - 12 Avenue SW; Calgary AB	51°02′30″N 114°04′26″W	Alberta (8408)		More images
Reverend George McDougall Memorial	Calgary AB	51°10′15″N 114°05′35″W	Alberta (8444)		Upload Photo
Fort Calgary National Historic Site	750 - 9 Ave SE; Calgary AB	51°02′42″N 114°02′38″W	Federal (12522), Alberta (8807)		More images
Molson's (Toronto Dominion) Bank	114 - 8 Avenue SW; Calgary AB	51°02′45″N 114°03′50″W	Alberta (8814)		More images
Odd Fellows Temple / Calgary Chamber of Commerce	106 - 6 Avenue SW; Calgary AB	51°02′51″N 114°03′48″W	Alberta (8815)		Upload Photo
Dominion (Toronto Dominion) Bank	200 - 8 Avenue SE; Calgary AB	51°02′44″N 114°03′40″W	Alberta (8975)		More images
Dafoe Terrace	1204 - 3 Street SE; Calgary AB	51°02′29″N 114°03′22″W	Alberta (8992)		
Fairey Terrace	1111 - 3 Street SE; Calgary AB	51°02′29″N 114°03′22″W	Alberta (8993)		
Perrenoud Homestead	near Cochrane; Rocky View County AB	51°16′24″N 114°30′36″W	Alberta (8997)		Upload Photo
Glenwood Manor	904 and 908 Memorial Drive NW; Calgary AB	51°03′17″N 114°04′48″W	Alberta (9000)		
St. Mary's Parish Hall	141 - 18 Avenue SW; Calgary AB	51°02′13″N 114°03′58″W	Alberta (9012)		
Treend Residence	1933 - 5 Street SW; Calgary AB	51°02′06″N 114°04′30″W	Alberta (9019)		More images
Heritage Hall of the Southern Alberta Institute of Technology	1301 - 16 Avenue NW; Calgary AB	51°03′51″N 114°05′20″W	Federal (12666), Alberta (9080)		More images
Calgary Courthouse No. 2	530 - 7 Avenue SW; Calgary AB	51°02′48″N 114°04′23″W	Alberta (9082)		More images
Memorial Park Library	1221 - 2 Street SW; Calgary AB	51°02′28″N 114°04′12″W	Alberta (9157)		More images
McDougall School	412 - 7 Street SW; Calgary AB	51°02′57″N 114°04′38″W	Alberta (9203)		
Centre Street Bridge	Calgary AB	51°03′10″N 114°03′43″W	Calgary municipality (9275)		More images
Merchants Bank Building	121 - 8 Avenue SW; Calgary AB	51°04′34″N 114°06′25″W	Calgary municipality (9276)		
Glenmore Water Treatment Plant	1668 - 56 Avenue SW; Calgary AB	51°02′45″N 114°03′50″W	Calgary municipality (9277)		
Tribune Block	118 - 8 Avenue SW; Calgary AB	51°02′45″N 114°03′50″W	Calgary municipality (9283)		
Fire Hall No. 4	104 - 6A Street NE; Calgary AB	51°03′09″N 114°02′49″W	Calgary municipality (9284)		Upload Photo
Calgary Public Building	201 - 8 Avenue SE; Calgary AB	51°03′01″N 114°03′54″W	Calgary municipality (9286)		More images
Bow River Pumphouse No. 2 (Pumphouse Theatre)	2140 Pumphouse Avenue SW; Calgary AB	51°02′25″N 114°06′36″W	Calgary municipality (9287)		More images
Balzac Archaeological Site	Calgary AB	51°11′00″N 114°00′39″W	Alberta (10860)		Upload Photo
Currie Barracks	(Former) Canadian Forces Base Calgary; Calgary AB	51°01′07″N 114°07′12″W	Alberta (11075)		
Mewata Armoury	Calgary AB	51°02′46″N 114°05′20″W	Federal (11239)		More images
Women's Buffalo Jump	northwest of Cayley; Foothills Municipal District No. 31 AB		Alberta (11515)		More images
Cochrane Ranche	Cochrane AB	51°11′48″N 114°28′12″W	Alberta (11541)		
Wood's Douglas Fir Tree Sanctuary	Calgary AB	51°05′39″N 114°13′30″W	Alberta (11610)		More images
Bar U Ranch National Historic Site	Bar U Ranch; Foothills Municipal District No. 31 AB	50°25′10″N 114°14′37″W	Federal (11640)	Q4857972	More images
Calgary Fire Hall No. 1	140 - 6 Avenue SE; Calgary AB	51°02′51″N 114°03′40″W	Alberta (11820)		More images
Zephyr Creek Pictographs	near Longview; Foothills Municipal District No. 31 AB		Alberta (11910)		Upload Photo
Canadian Pacific Railway Station	406 1st Street SW; High River AB	50°34′45″N 113°52′20″W	Alberta (8189)		
Inglewood Telephone Building	1311 - 9 Avenue SE; Calgary AB	51°02′27″N 114°02′02″W	Alberta (12409)		More images
Mewata Drill Hall / Calgary Drill Hall National Historic Site	801 11th St. SW; Calgary AB	51°02′44″N 114°05′20″W	Federal (12607)		
Leighton House and Art Centre	near Okotoks; Foothills Municipal District No. 31 AB	50°47′44″N 114°12′43″W	Alberta (15486)		Upload Photo
Turner Valley Gas Works	Turner Valley AB	50°40′15″N 114°16′08″W	Alberta (15532)		More images
St. Paul's Anglican Church	146 Avenue and Macleod Trail (Midnapore); Calgary AB	50°55′18″N 114°04′16″W	Alberta (17906)		More images
Irricana United Church	Junction of Township Road 272 (Highway 567) and Range Road 274, approximately 10 km west of Irricana; Irricana AB	51°17′58″N 113°45′22″W	Alberta (19036)		Upload Photo

== See also ==
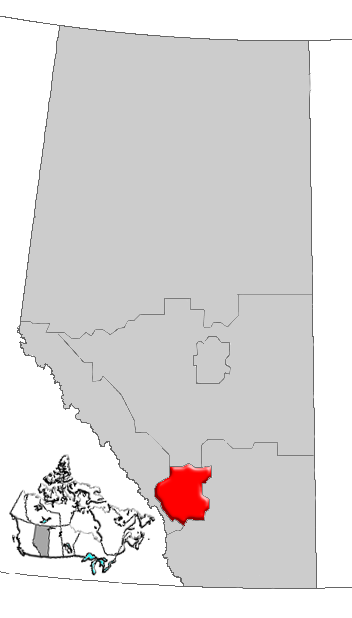
- List of historic places in Alberta
- List of historic places in the Edmonton Capital Region
- National Historic Sites in Alberta
