= Medalta Potteries =

Canadian ceramics manufacturing company

Coordinates: 50°01′54″N 110°38′59″W

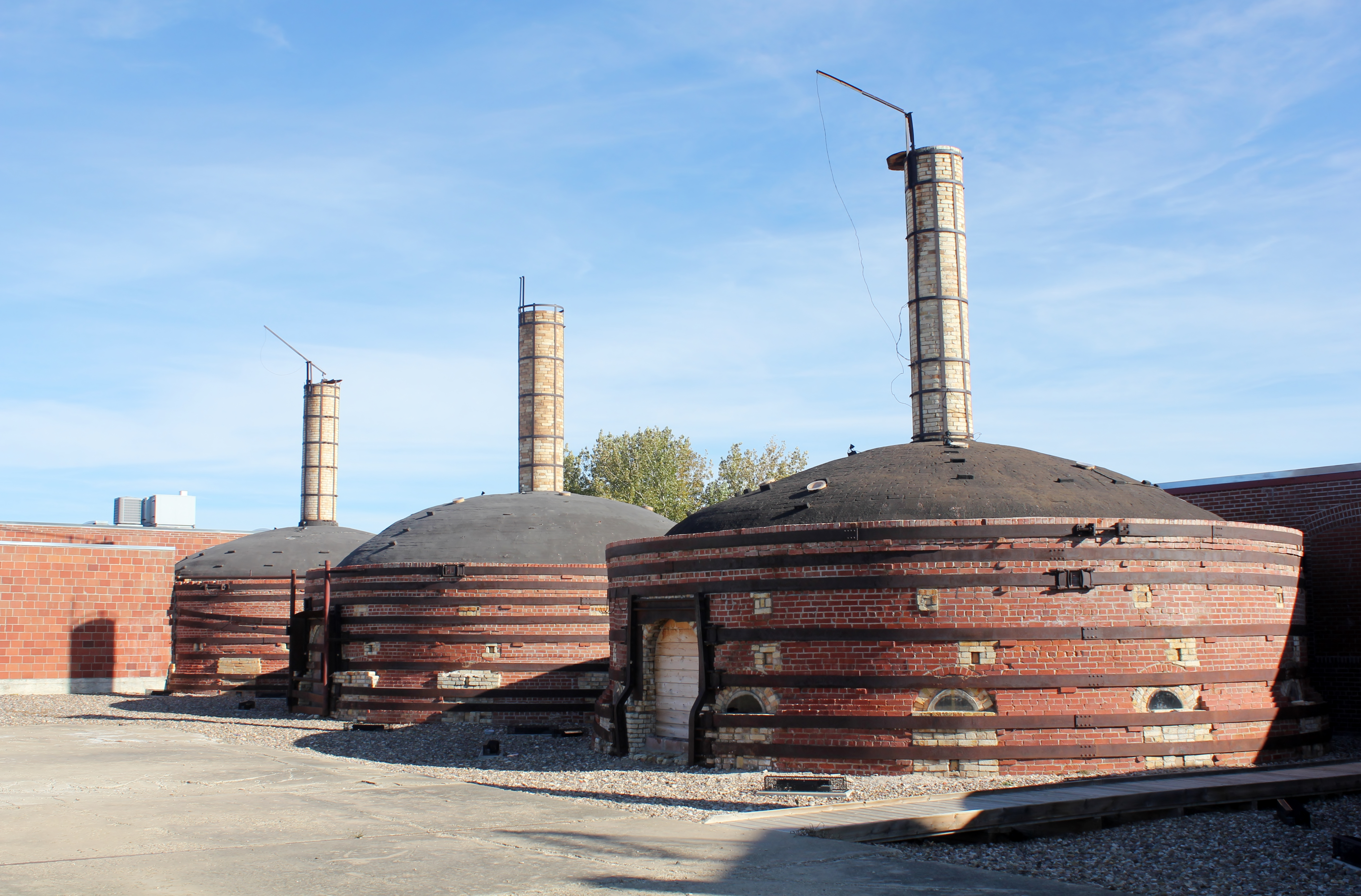
- Brick kilns
- Company type: Private
- Industry: Ceramics, china
- Founded: 1916; 110 years ago
- Defunct: 1954; 72 years ago
- Fate: Bankruptcy
- Headquarters: Medicine Hat, Alberta, Canada

The Medalta Potteries was a Canadian ceramics manufacturing company in Medicine Hat, Alberta, that operated from 1916 to 1954. It was the first manufacturer in Western Canada to ship its products east of Ontario.

== Background ==
The rich natural resources in the area surrounding Medicine Hat provided impetus for the development of industry. Among them was natural gas, used for heating, lighting, and to generate electricity for powering industrial operations.

Most Canadians at the time bought ceramic products from large, established manufacturers based in the United States, particularly Red Wing Stoneware of Red Wing, Minnesota, in western Canada, and Ohio potteries in eastern Canada. Three partners established Medalta Stoneware in 1916, starting with 12 employees, to prove that Canadian-made ceramics could compete with those from the United States, and that it was "equal in quality to any made in America".

== History ==
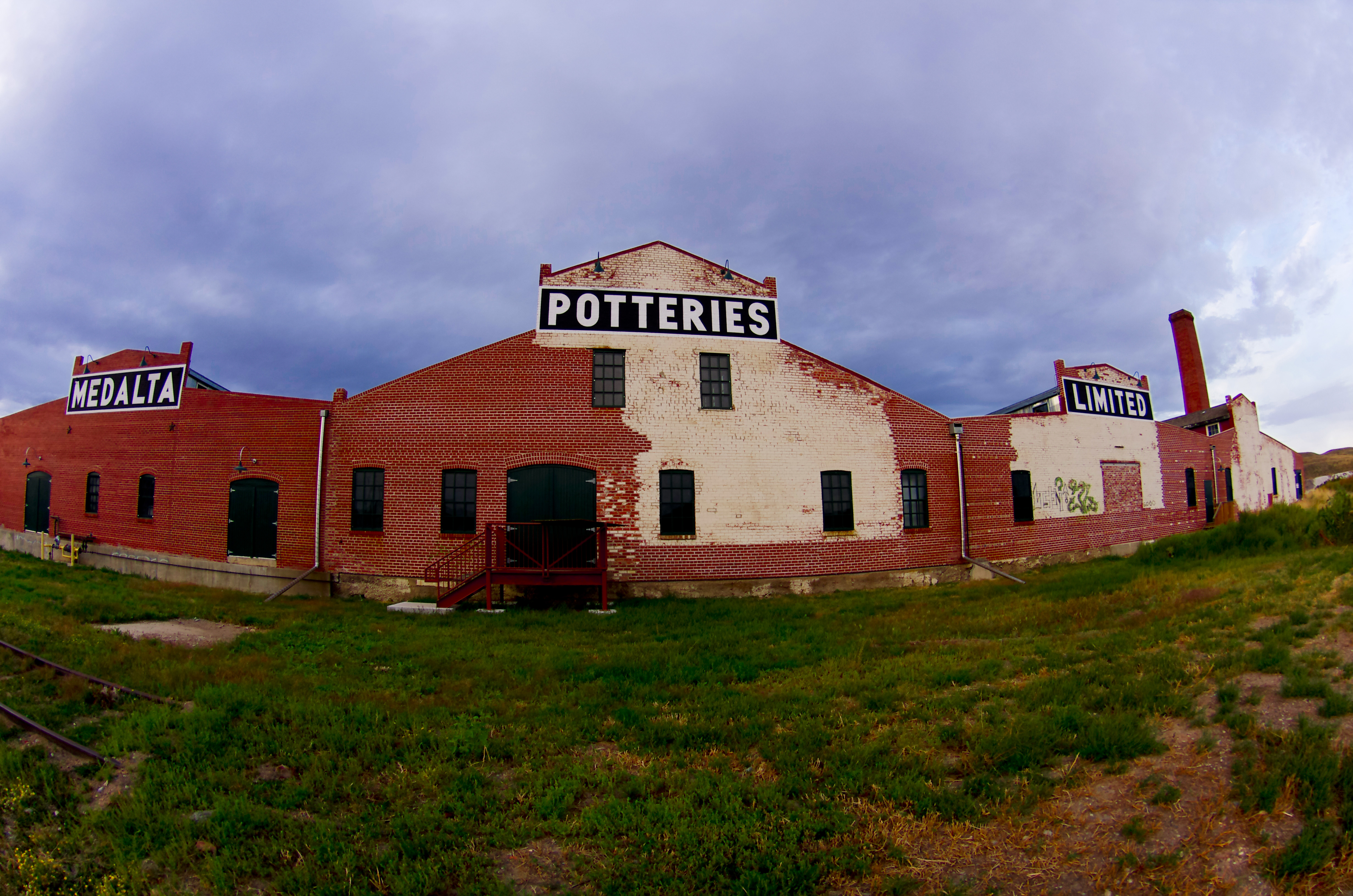
Medalta Potteries

The company's products gradually displaced American-made ceramics at western Canadian retailers. The plant became famous, and was an attraction for dignitaries, being visited by Lord Byng, the Duke of Devonshire, and the Prince of Wales by 1920. In 1921, it became the first western Canadian company to ship goods other than cereal grains east of Manitoba. Its incursion into the eastern Canadian market posed the first serious competition for Robinson Clay Products of Ohio in that market, which it met by decreasing its prices by 25%. Robinson Clay had a financial advantage over Medalta, as its customs dues were 15% lower.

In 1924, the company was reorganized and renamed to "Medalta Potteries", at the time producing 75% of Canada's stoneware, including that for the entire western Canada market. The company discontinued its manufacture of red clay flower pots at this time, instead focusing on more decorative flower pots with a cream-coloured glazing that had become popular amongst its customers. A buyer for Eaton's wrote to the company, requesting that it "make a real flower pot". In 1928, after purchasing a used press from Montana and quarrying red clay from the surrounding land, it began manufacturing red clay pots again.

Despite its success, the company made little profit and was constantly searching for used equipment it could obtain inexpensively to expand its business. With a workforce of 82 employees earning an average of $3.25 per hour, Medalta's labour costs were significantly higher than those of manufacturers of imported ceramics from Austria, Czechoslovakia, England, France, Germany, and Japan.

It also relied on the railways to ship its source material, which it obtained from numerous sources. From Ohio it obtained stilts, wire cloth, and cones. Chicago was the source of pickle jar wire and "red seal zinc white", and New York was the source for various chemicals, including barium, iron oxide, manganese, nickel, oxides of chromium, and "black under glaze". From England it obtained sponges, from New Brunswick came plaster of Paris, from Toronto came ground feldspar, from Winnipeg came gilders whiting (finely crushed chalk), and from Deloro, Ontario came black cobalt oxide.

== Operation ==
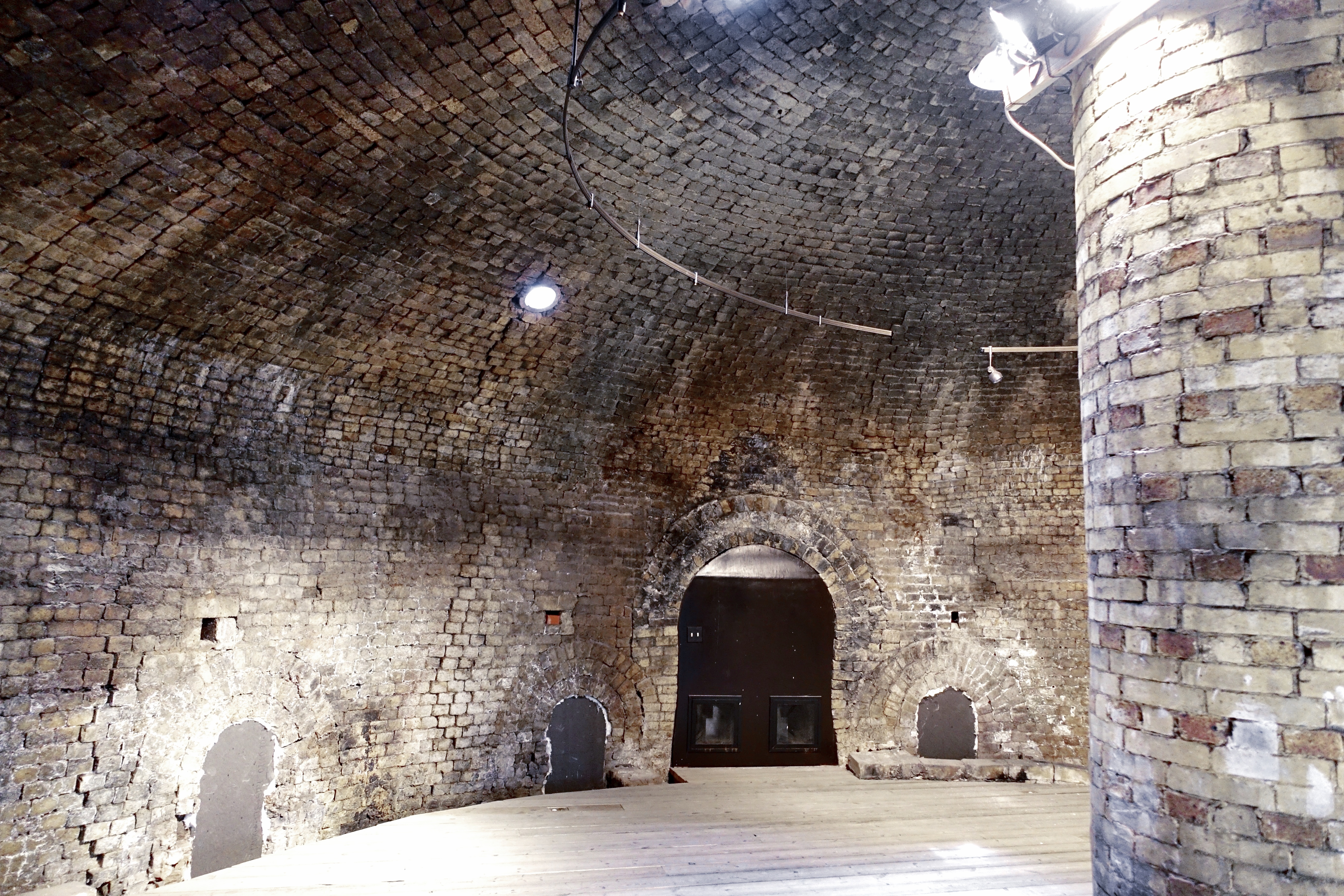
The interior of one of the kilns

The clay used for manufacturing the ceramics at Medalta Potteries was imported from Saskatchewan, as the local clay was unsuitable for such use. The clay provisioned by Medalta included three varieties. From Chocolate Drop Hill near Eastend the company received shipments of a "chocolate clay", a dark clay that "burned a lighter colour than stoneware clay". A clay known as "Saskatchewan Ball Clay" that burned white was obtained from a site near Willows, and the stoneware clays were obtained from Eastend and Ravenscrag. The company constantly had a clay surplus, which it sold to brick manufacturers and Vancouver schools.

The clay was processed in the factory (now known as the Old Factory), and the ceramics produced in the Turning Room. Among the products manufactured were beanpots, butter churns, crocks, mixing bowls, and water coolers.

During the Great Depression of the 1930s, the company's officers permitted travellers to use the cooling kilns as a temporary accommodation as they crossed the country in search of work. The kilns could house up to 40 people overnight; they were required to vacate the premises before the start of the next workday.

== National Historic Site ==
The manufacturing complex was restored, and is now a working museum. In a building adjacent to the site replicas of Medalta pottery are manufactured, to be sold in the museum gift shop.

Several galleries are located in the complex. These include: the Collector's Gallery, located near the kilns and exhibiting the Tony Schlachter Collection; the Yuill Family Gallery of contemporary works, for travelling exhibits and works by resident artists; and the Les Manning Gallery, named for the ceramic artist who conceived the Shaw International Centre for Contemporary Ceramics in which the gallery is housed.
