= Brooks Aqueduct =

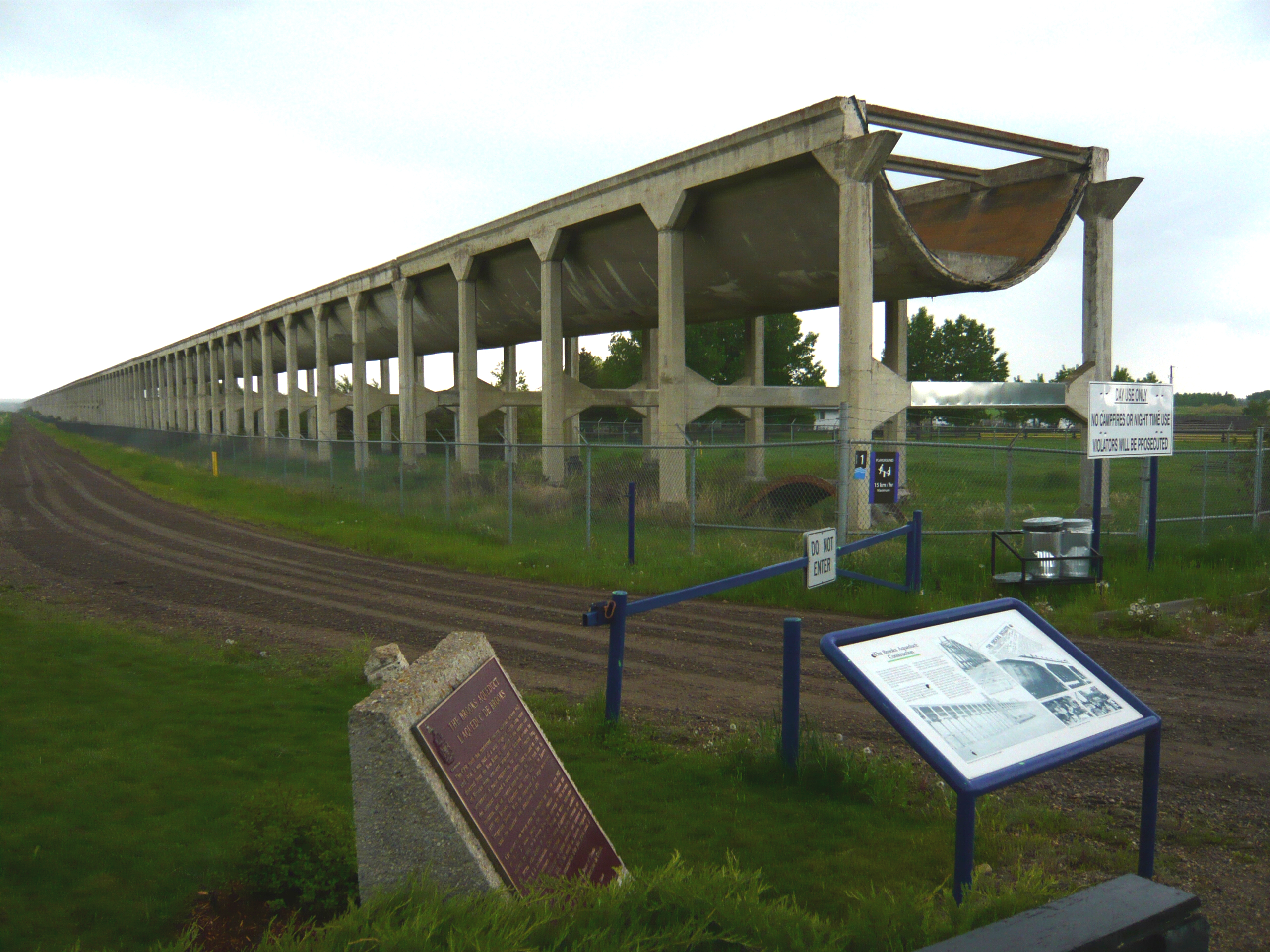

- Location within Alberta
- 50.5289°N 111.8550°W
- Type: aqueduct
- Location: Brooks, Alberta, Canada
- Nearest city: County of Newell

History
- Built: 1912–1914
- Original use: Aqueduct

Site notes
- Governing body: Parks Canada
- Website: Brooks Aqueduct

National Historic Site of Canada
- Official name: Brooks Aqueduct National Historic Site of Canada
- Designated: 18 November 1983

Alberta Historic Resources Act
- Official name: Brooks Aqueduct
- Designated: 20 July 2000

The Brooks Aqueduct is a defunct aqueduct, historic site and museum originally built by the irrigation division of the Canadian Pacific Railway Company during the early 1910s in Southern Alberta, Canada. The aqueduct was intended to irrigate a section of southeastern Alberta by diverting water east from Lake Newell from 1914 to 1979, and is located approximately 8 kilometres south of the City of Brooks. The main section of the aqueduct spans a 3.2 km valley at an average elevation of 20 metres. The structure has been designated a National Historic Site with an interpretive centre constructed nearby for tourists.

== History ==
The Brooks Aqueduct was conceived by the Canadian Pacific Railway (CPR) as a mechanism to irrigate a portion of the Palliser's Triangle in southern Alberta. CPR received a 12,000-square-kilometre (3-million-acre) block of land between Calgary and Medicine Hat as a payment for the completion of the transcontinental railway, which was divided into the Western, Central and Eastern sections. The Eastern section of the land grant provided access to the Bow River and the reservoir at the Bassano Dam, which was fed to agricultural operations through a series of canals and irrigation projects built by CPR. Hugh B. Muckleston, the Assistant Chief Engineer for the Department of Natural Resources for CPR was the first to envision the Brooks Aqueduct, noting an earthen filled canal would be inconceivable given the terrain conditions. The decision was made to use reinforced Portland cement with an open flume designed as a hydrostatic catenary curve. The design also incorporated expansion joints to allow for movement along the long aqueduct due to expansion and contraction with varying temperatures, the joints were made primarily of copper. The expansion joints were placed every 24 metres (80 ft) or fourth bent. To cross the CPR main line, a siphon was built which operated on the Venturi principle 12 metres (40 ft) under the railway tracks.

The firm of Grant, Smith & Co. & McDonnell of Vancouver was contracted to construct the Brooks Aqueduct between 1912 and 1914. At its completion in 1914, and beginning of operations in 1915 the CA$700,000, at a length of 3.1 kilometres Brooks Aqueduct claimed to be the largest concrete structure in existence. The copper expansion joints had significant leaks following construction which caused damage to the concrete supports, this was mitigated by drainage ditches and efforts to reduce the leakage, furthermore the alkalinity of the water conveyed, combined with frost accumulation caused unavoidable deterioration to the concrete structure. CPR continued to refurbish the aqueduct through the 1920s and early 1930s, spraying gunnite over the rotting pedestals and flaking concrete shells. Following the completion of these upgrades in 1934 the Brooks Aqueduct was transferred to the Eastern Irrigation District, a farmer-owned entity formed under the Irrigation Districts Act in 1935, this was part of a larger divestment in the region by CPR. The aqueduct was used for irrigation for about 30 years. Its original capacity was 25 m^{3}/s (900 cu ft/s). and the 113,000 hectares of land which were provided with water led to a new wave of settlement.

In 1969, the Alberta and Canadian governments assumed the responsibility of maintaining the structure under the Prairie Farm Rehabilitation Administration. The Brooks Aqueduct and Bassano Dam were evaluated, and it was found that the dam would require minor rehabilitation, while the aqueduct was no longer suitable for operations. A series of earthen canals were constructed as a replacement for the aqueduct, and after evaluating the cost of demolishing the structure, the governments decided it would be more financially prudent to fence the aqueduct off from the public.

== Legacy ==
The Brooks Aqueduct continues to stand to this day, although the structure itself is no longer structurally sound and has been fenced off since the 1970s. The Brooks Aqueduct and the immediate surrounding area was designated a National Historic Site of Canada on 18 November 1983 by the Government of Canada. The Brooks Aqueduct would later be designated a Provincial Historical Resource by the Government of Alberta on 20 July 2000.

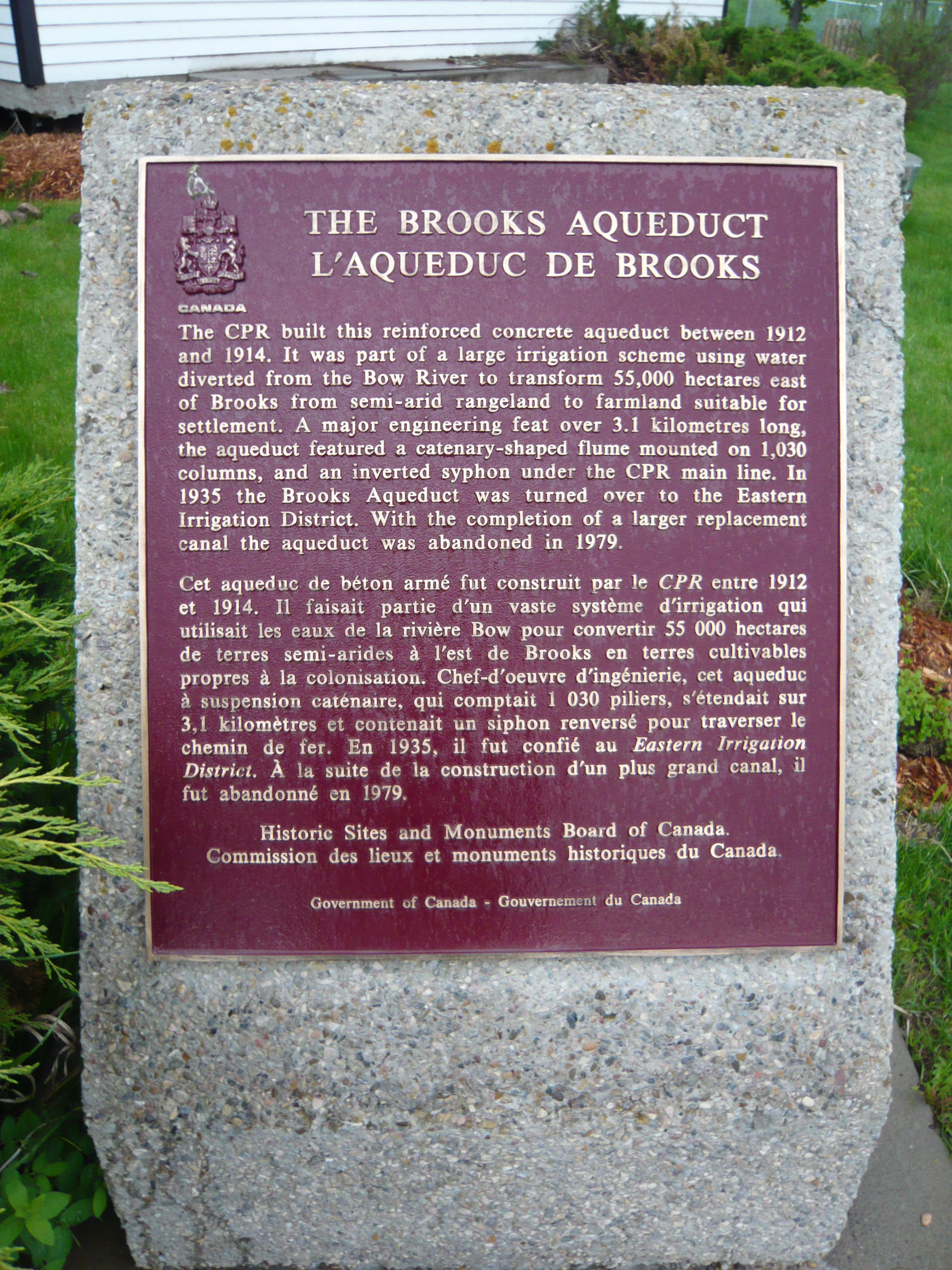
Brooks Aqueduct Historic Site Plaque
