= Jasper Park Information Centre =

Coordinates: 52.87731°N 118.080835°W

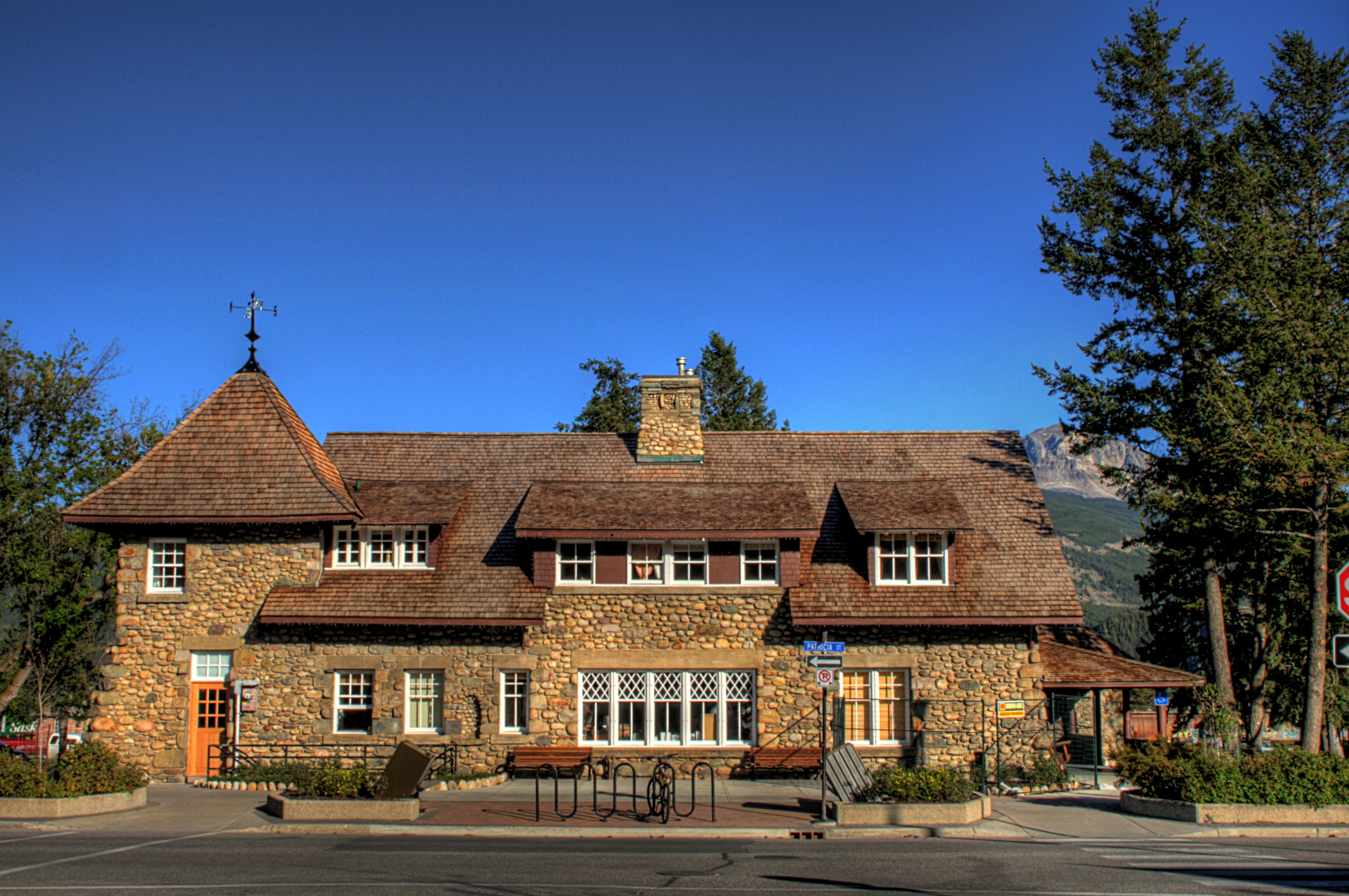
- Interactive map of Jasper Park Information Centre
- Location: Jasper, Alberta, Alberta, Canada

History
- Built: 1914

Site notes
- Architect: A.M. Calderon
- Architectural style: Rustic
- Governing body: Parks Canada
- Website: Parks Canada page

National Historic Site of Canada
- Designated: 1992

The Jasper Park Information Centre National Historic Site, located in Jasper National Park, Alberta, Canada, is the primary visitor contact centre for visitors to the park. Sited in the Jasper townsite, it was built as the park administration building in 1913-1914, and became the visitor contact centre in 1972. It is located in Athabasca Park, which is not included in the National Historic Site designation.

The Information Centre was one of the first rustic style buildings to be built in a Canadian national park. Conceived by park superintendent Lt. Colonel Maynard Rogers and designed by Edmonton architect A.M. Calderon, it incorporates local materials and construction techniques. The design is unique. No two windows or doors are the same, and the different peaks of the roof were meant to remind a visitor of the surrounding mountains.

As built, it was a multi-purpose building. The ground floor was the park superintendent's residence and the park's administrative office. Upstairs, there was a library, a small museum and a drafting room. The basement included a fish hatchery. The building served as a landmark for arriving train passengers on the Canadian National railway line that runs through the park. The administration building was the prototype for future construction in the Jasper townsite, and influenced building designs throughout the Canadian park system.

In 1936 a separate residence was built for the superintendent. The fish hatchery moved out in 1941 to a site near the confluence Athabasca and Maligne rivers. The first park information centre was built in 1949 near the Canadian National line in front of the main building. In 1972 the information centre moved into the old headquarters. In 1988, the Jasper Park Information Centre was designated a Classified Federal Heritage Building and in 1992 it was designated a National Historic Site of Canada. The upper floor is used as office space.
