= Sulphur Mountain Cosmic Ray Station =

National Historic Site in Banff NP, Alberta, Canada

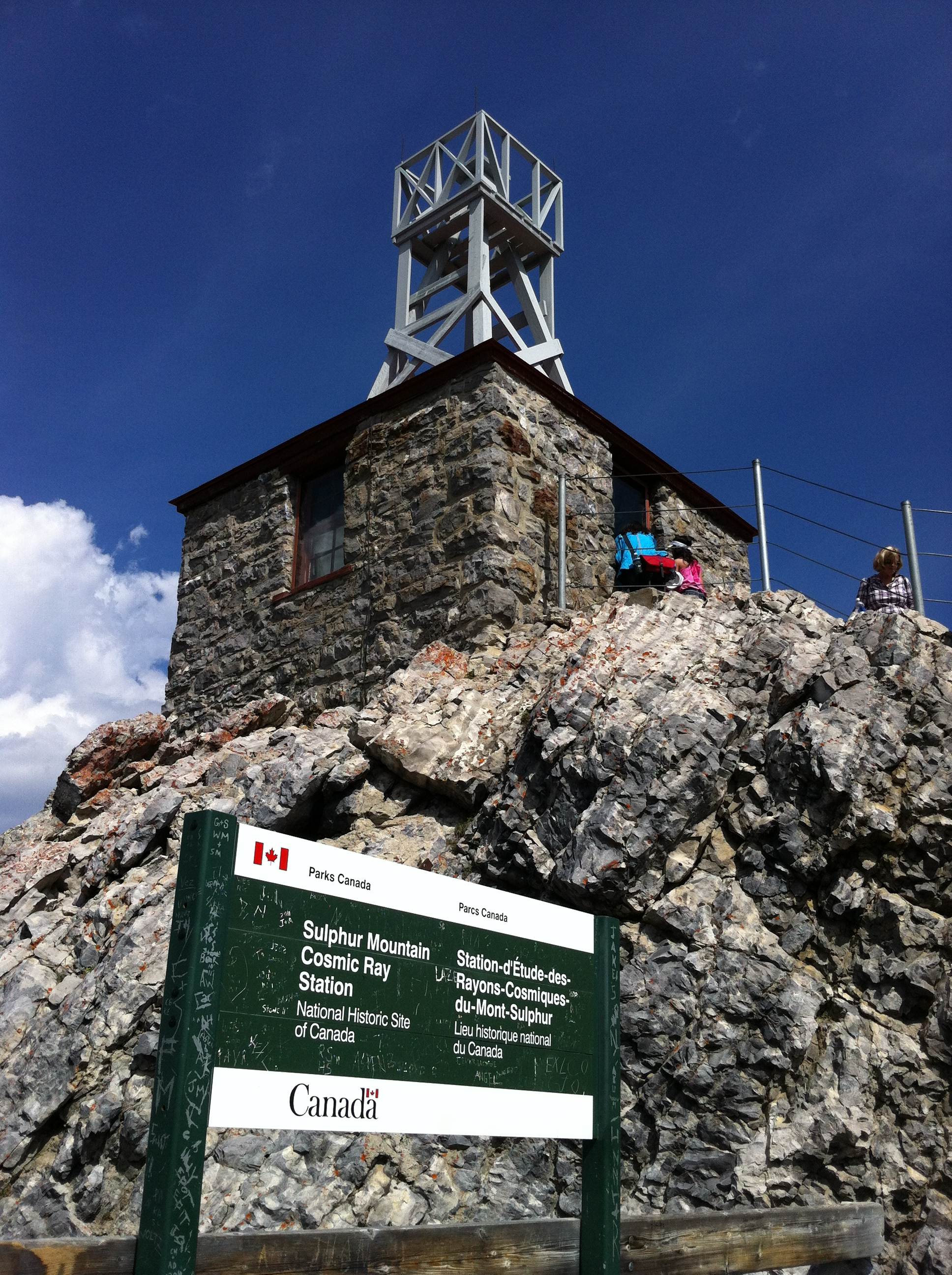
- View of the weather station perched on the summit of Sulphur Mountain just above where the dismantled Cosmic Ray Station once stood

- Location within Alberta
- 51°08′48″N 115°34′40″W
- Location: Banff, Banff National Park, Alberta, Canada

History
- Founder: National Research Council
- Built: 1956

Site notes
- Elevation: 2,283 m (7,490 ft)
- Governing body: Parks Canada
- Website: Parks Canada page

National Historic Site of Canada
- Designated: 1982

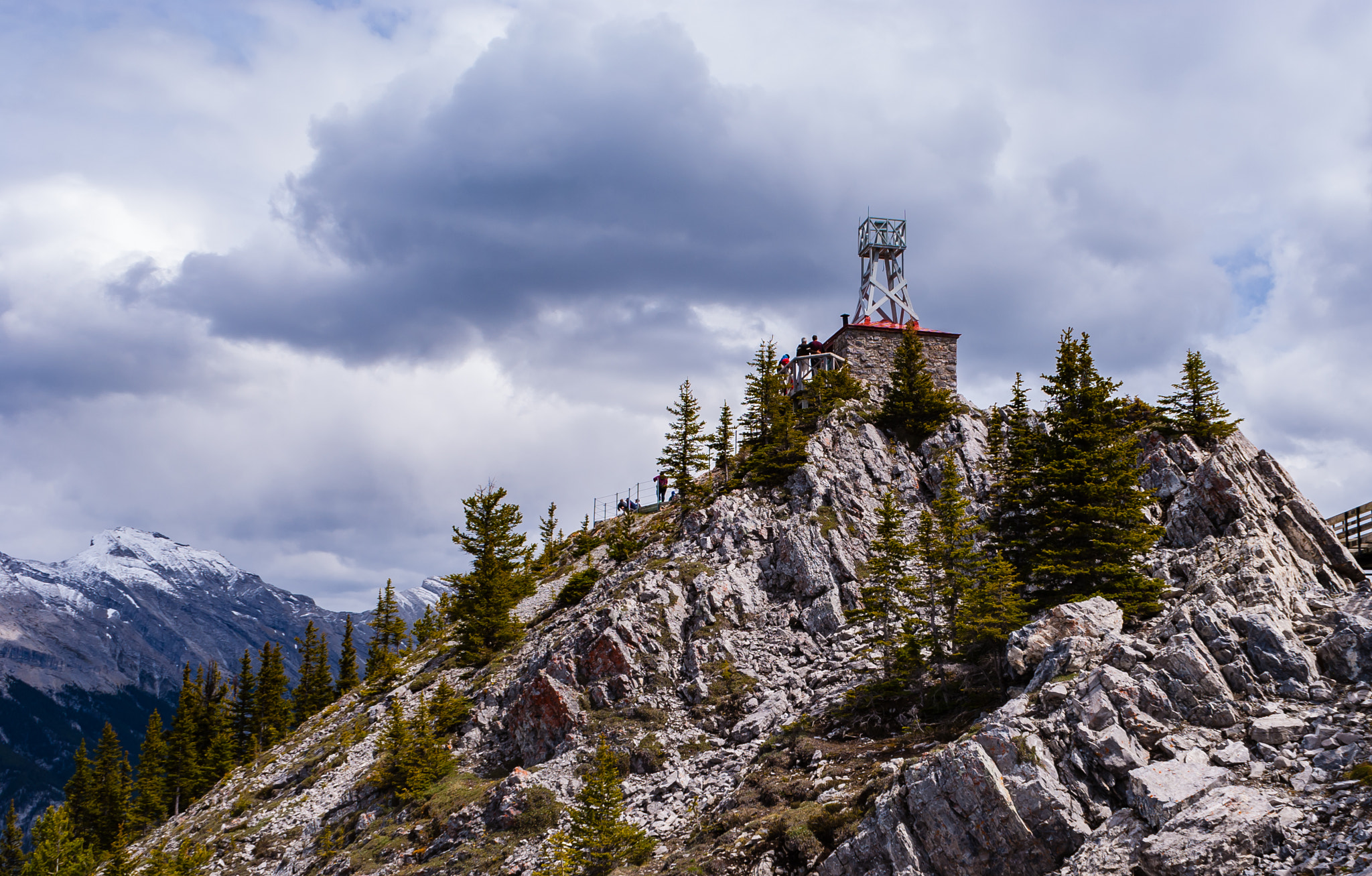
A view from gondola station of the Sulphur Mountain Cosmic Ray station, a National Historic Site of Canada.

Sulphur Mountain Cosmic Ray Station, a National Historic Site of Canada found atop Sulphur Mountain in Banff National Park, commemorates Canada's participation in the International Geophysical Year, during 1957 to 1958. Canada constructed nine sites to study cosmic rays, but this site in particular was the most important due to its higher elevation. The National Research Council constructed a laboratory at the site in the winter of 1956–57. The building was not visible from the Banff townsite as a condition of its construction.

The station was run by Dr. B. G. Wilson with the help of two assistants and was equipped with a standard IGY neutron monitor. The national research council maintained its operation until 1960 when the University of Calgary took over its operations and Dr. Wilson found a permanent position there. An improved NM64 neutron monitor was installed in 1963 but the IGY monitor continued to operate until 1972. The station ceased operations in 1978 and the building was dismantled in 1981. In 1982 it was designated as a National Historic Site. A plaque now marks the spot of the station's location.

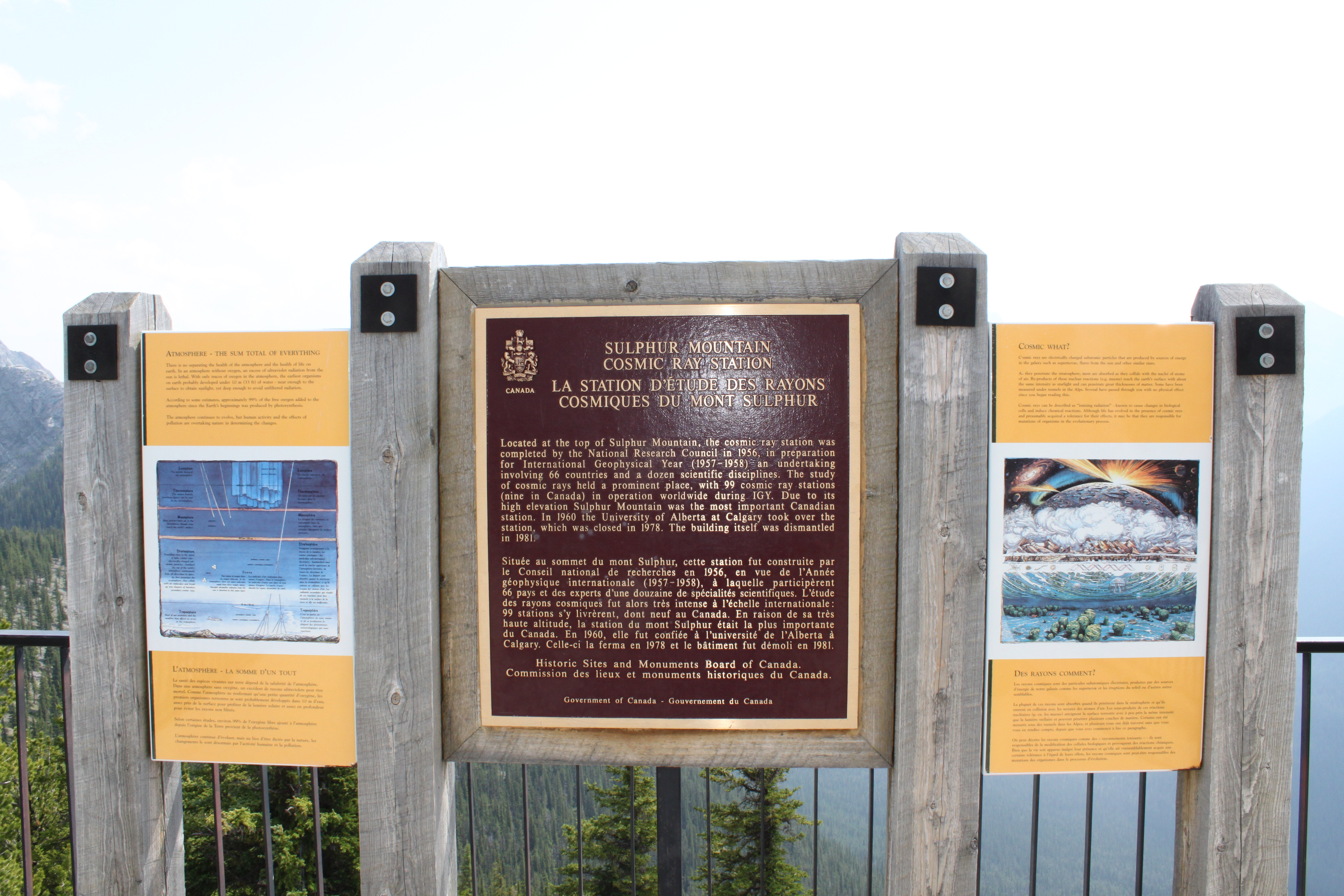
Plaque in 2009

== See also ==
- List of astronomical observatories
