= Calgary Alberta Temple =

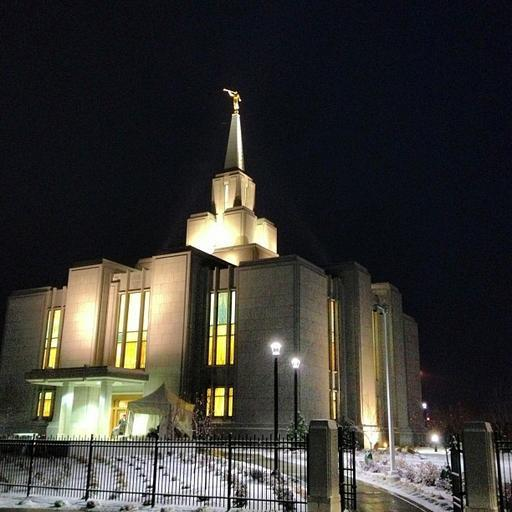
- Calgary Alberta Temple at night
- Interactive map of Calgary Alberta Temple
- Number: 140
- Dedication: 28 October 2012, by Thomas S. Monson
- Site: 10.17 acres (4.12 ha)
- Floor area: 33,000 ft^{2} (3,100 m^{2})
- Height: 115 ft (35 m)
- Official website • News & images

Church chronology
← Brigham City Utah Temple	Calgary Alberta Temple	→ Tegucigalpa Honduras Temple

Additional information
- Announced: 4 October 2008, by Thomas S. Monson
- Groundbreaking: 15 May 2010, by Donald L. Hallstrom
- Open house: 29 September-20 October 2012
- Current president: Cameron Olson
- Location: Calgary, Canada
- Coordinates: 51°8′25.3356″N 114°13′54.5016″W
- Exterior finish: Gray granite from China
- Baptistries: 1
- Ordinance rooms: 2 (two-stage progressive)
- Sealing rooms: 3
- Notes: Announced at the 178th Semiannual General Conference.

The Calgary Alberta Temple is the 140th temple of the Church of Jesus Christ of Latter-day Saints (LDS Church). The intent to build the temple was announced on October 4, 2008, by church president Thomas S. Monson, during general conference. It was the third temple built in Alberta. The first, previously known as the Alberta Temple, was built in Cardston in 1923. The Edmonton Alberta Temple opened in 1999.

The temple has a single attached central spire with a statue of the angel Moroni. This temple was designed by Abbarch Architecture, an architectural firm located in Vancouver, British Columbia. A groundbreaking ceremony, to signify the beginning of construction, was held on May 15, 2010, conducted by Donald L. Hallstrom of the Presidency of the Seventy.

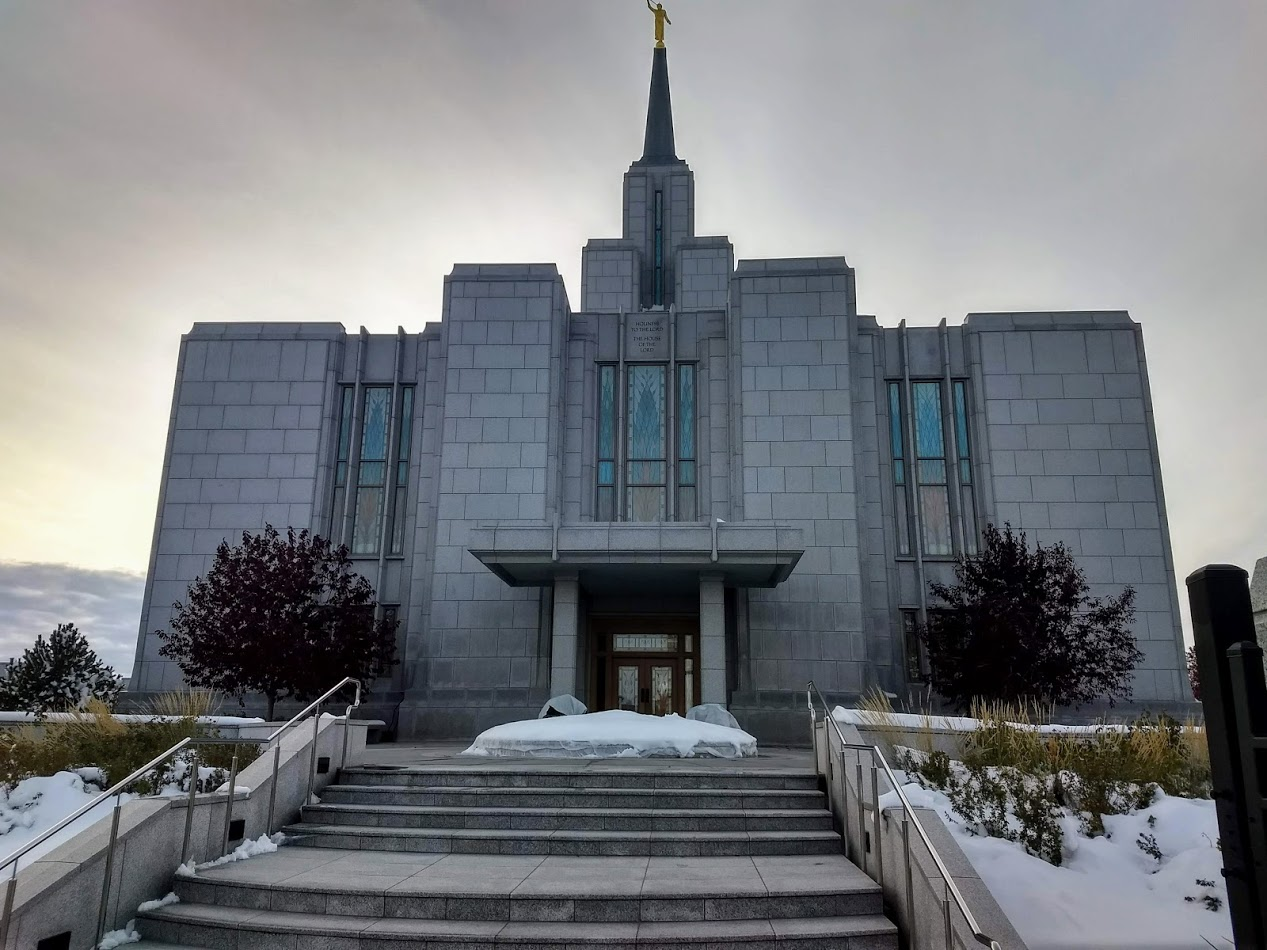
A view of the Calgary Alberta Temple.

== History ==
Church president Thomas S. Monson announced the intent to build the Calgary Alberta Temple on 4 October 2008, during general conference. At the time, the temple was intended to serve over 18,000 church members in Calgary and the surrounding areas. The temple is located adjacent to the church's Royal Oak chapel in northwest Calgary.

The groundbreaking on May 15, 2010 was presided over by Donald L. Hallstrom, with other church general authorities and area leaders in attendance, including William R. Walker and Richard K. Melchin. After construction was completed, a public open house was held from September 29 to October 20, 2012, where over 100,000 people toured the temple. A cultural celebration was held October 27, 2012, and the temple was dedicated by Monson the following day.

The first president of the temple was Blair S. Bennett, a former stake president and area seventy from Sherwood Park, Alberta.

In 2020, like all the church's others, the Calgary Alberta Temple was closed for a time in response to the COVID-19 pandemic.

== Design and architecture ==
Designed by Abbarch Architecture, the temple's traditional Latter-day Saint design and architecture reflects both the cultural heritage of Alberta and its spiritual significance to the church.

The temple is on a 10.17-acre plot, with landscaping of bushes, flower beds, and trees. These elements are designed to provide a tranquil setting to enhance the sacred atmosphere of the site.

The structure stands three stories tall and is constructed with gray granite from China. The exterior has a single attached central spire topped with a statue of the angel Moroni, chosen for their symbolic significance and alignment with temple traditions.

The interior has stained-glass windows and other decorative elements like railings and doorknobs centered around a wheat stalk motif to represent Alberta’s agriculture. The interior has a green and gold color scheme. There is “a hand-painted mural of a scenic Alberta landscape,” in one room of the temple, with other paintings throughout. The temple includes two instruction rooms, three sealing rooms, and a baptistry, each designed for ceremonial use.

The design uses elements representing the history and heritage of Alberta, to provide deeper spiritual meaning to the temple's appearance and function. Symbolism is important to church members and includes the wheat stalk motif found throughout the temple, which represents the region’s long agricultural history.

== Temple presidents ==
The church's temples are directed by a temple president and matron, each serving for a term of three years. The president and matron oversee the administration of temple operations and provide guidance and training for both temple patrons and staff.

Serving from 2012 to 2015, the first president of the Calgary Alberta Temple was Blair S. Bennett, with Mary Jane E. Bennett serving as matron. As of 2024, G. Lawrence Spackman is the president, with Flora E. Spackman as matron.

== Admittance ==
On June 6, 2012, the church announced the public open house that was held from September 29 to October 20, 2012 (excluding Sundays). The temple was dedicated by Thomas S. Monson on October 28, 2012.

Like all the church's temples, it is not used for Sunday worship services. To members of the church, temples are regarded as sacred houses of the Lord. Once dedicated, only church members with a current temple recommend can enter for worship.

== See also ==
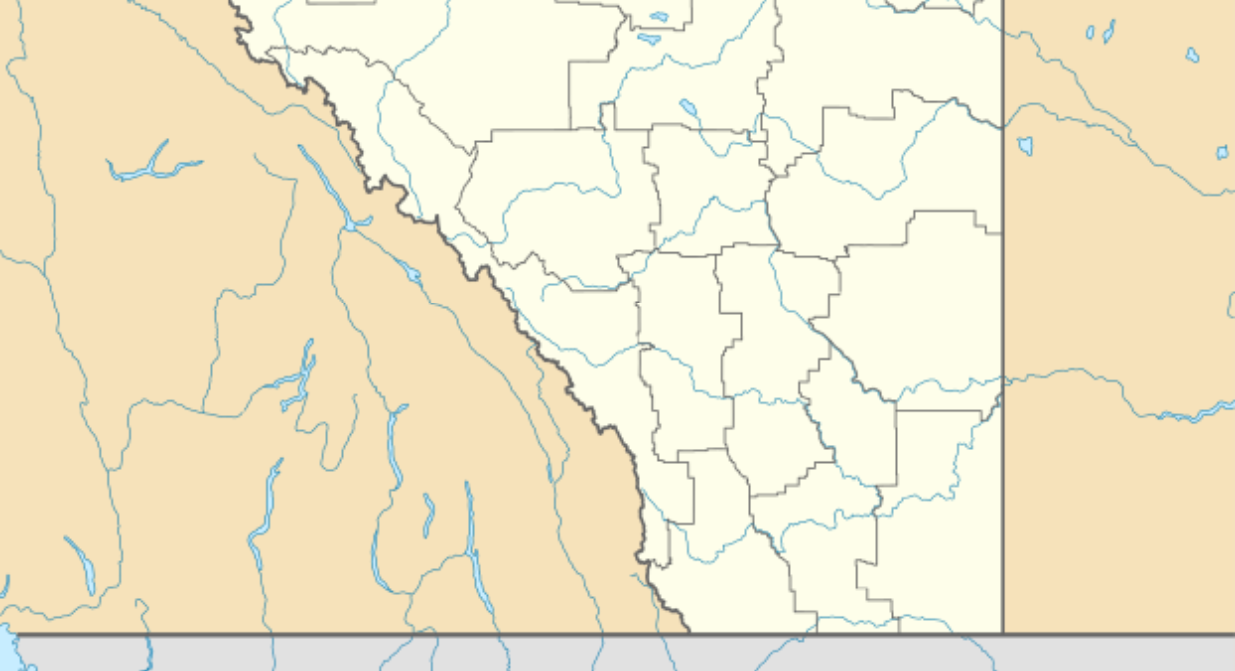

Temples in Alberta

Canada Temples
Temples in Canada

= Operating
= Under construction
= Announced
= Temporarily Closed

- Comparison of temples of The Church of Jesus Christ of Latter-day Saints
- List of places of worship in Calgary
- List of temples of The Church of Jesus Christ of Latter-day Saints
- List of temples of The Church of Jesus Christ of Latter-day Saints by geographic region
- Temple architecture (Latter-day Saints)
- The Church of Jesus Christ of Latter-day Saints in Canada
