= Halifax Nova Scotia Temple =

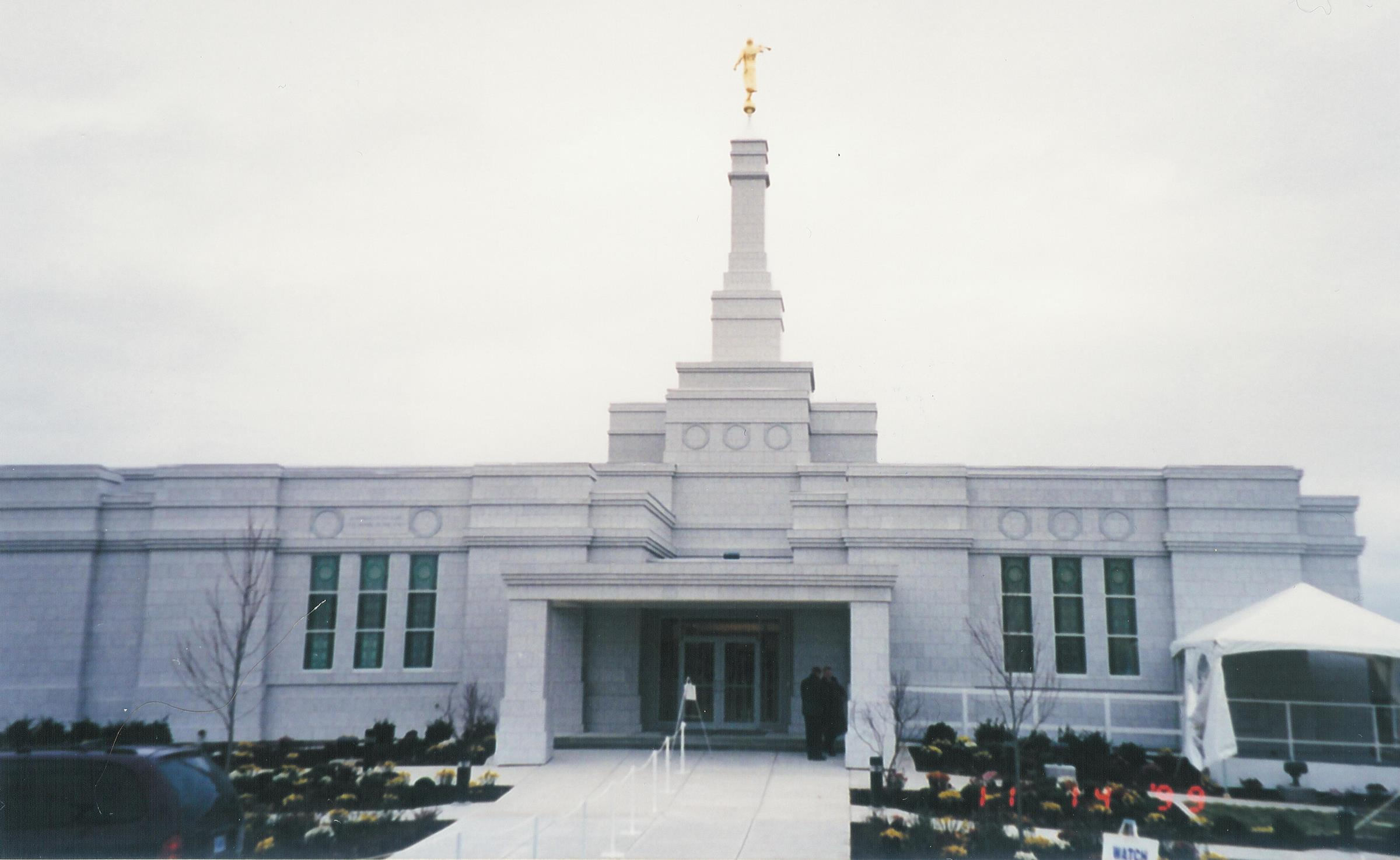
- Interactive map of Halifax Nova Scotia Temple
- Number: 64
- Dedication: 14 November 1999, by Gordon B. Hinckley
- Site: 2 acres (0.81 ha)
- Floor area: 10,700 ft^{2} (990 m^{2})
- Height: 71 ft (22 m)
- Official website • News & images

Church chronology
← Detroit Michigan Temple	Halifax Nova Scotia Temple	→ Regina Saskatchewan Temple

Additional information
- Announced: 7 May 1998, by Gordon B. Hinckley
- Groundbreaking: 12 October 1998, by Jay E. Jensen
- Open house: 4–7 November 1999
- Current president: George Colin Pattison
- Designed by: L.A. Beaubien and Associates, and Church A&E Services
- Location: Dartmouth, Nova Scotia, Canada
- Coordinates: 44°40′12.00000″N 63°29′20.56919″W
- Exterior finish: White Bethel granite
- Design: Classic modern, single spire design
- Baptistries: 1
- Ordinance rooms: 2 (two-stage progressive)
- Sealing rooms: 2

The Halifax Nova Scotia Temple is a temple of the Church of Jesus Christ of Latter-day Saints, located in Dartmouth, Nova Scotia, Canada. The intent to build the temple was announced by the First Presidency on May 7, 1998. It is the first temple in Nova Scotia, the third in Canada, and the 64th worldwide.

The temple serves members across Atlantic Canada—including Nova Scotia, New Brunswick, Prince Edward Island, and Newfoundland—as well as church members from Maine, USA.

== History ==
Plans to build the temple were announced on May 7, 1998, by the First Presidency. A groundbreaking ceremony was held on October 12, 1998, Canadian Thanksgiving Day, with Jay E. Jensen, of the Seventy, presiding. Despite heavy rain, about 700 church members attended, traveling from across the Maritime provinces.

Local leaders emphasized the blessing of having a temple in Atlantic Canada, as previously members often had to drive up to 24 hours to attend the temples in Washington, D.C. or Toronto.

After construction was completed, a public open house was held from November 4–7, 1999, and had approximately 8,000 visitors. Guests included Nova Scotia lieutenant governor J. James Kinley, his wife, Grace. The largest provincial newspaper featured a front-page photograph of the angel Moroni statue on top of the temple, which sparked curiosity and resulted in numerous phone inquiries about visiting.

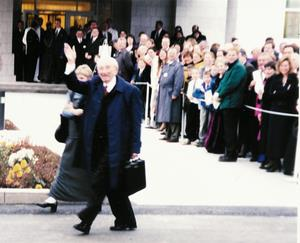
Hinckley waving to the crowd after the dedication

The Halifax Nova Scotia Temple was dedicated on November 14, 1999, in three sessions by church president Gordon B. Hinckley. Originally scheduled for November 13, the dedication was delayed after mechanical problems with Hinckley’s airplane postponed his arrival. As a result, Boyd K. Packer, acting president of the Quorum of the Twelve Apostles, dedicated the Regina Saskatchewan Temple the same day, while Hinckley was in Halifax. This was the first time in church history that two temples were dedicated on the same day.

In 2020, like all the church's others, the Halifax Nova Scotia Temple was closed for a time in response to the COVID-19 pandemic.

== Architecture and design ==
The temple is a single-spire building and has a statue of the angel Moroni. The exterior uses white Bethel granite, and the temple is on a two-acre (0.8 ha) site in Dartmouth.

The building is 10,700 square feet (994 m²), with dimensions of 149 by 77 feet. It has two ordinance rooms, two sealing rooms, and a baptistry. L.A. Beaubien and Associates, in partnership with the church’s architecture and engineering services team, did the design, with Dineen Construction being the contractor, with William Treu as project manager.

== Community impact ==
Richard Moses, second counselor presidency of the Dartmouth Nova Scotia Stake and chair of the temple committee, described the temple as a “beacon” visible from his daughters’ bedroom window. He also noted that local members hosted visitors when the dedication was postponed, requiring some to stay an extra night.

News coverage at the time reported that some attendees traveled long distances, including members from Newfoundland who drove several hours to reach the ferry before continuing to Halifax. Church leaders described th travel as an expression of faith, although participants described it as part of their religious commitment rather than a sacrifice.

Accounts in church publications recorded community interest, including some local reporters and open-house visitors who described feeling a strong emotional response inside the temple.

== Temple leadership and admittance ==
The church's temples are directed by a temple president and matron, each typically serving for a term of three years. The president and matron oversee the administration of temple operations and provide guidance and training for both temple patrons and staff. As of 2025, George C. Pattison is the president, with Lisa D. Pattison serving as matron.

Like all the church's temples, it is not used for Sunday worship services. To members of the church, temples are regarded as sacred houses of the Lord. Once dedicated, only church members with a current temple recommend can enter for worship.

== See also ==

Temples in Canada

Alberta Temples
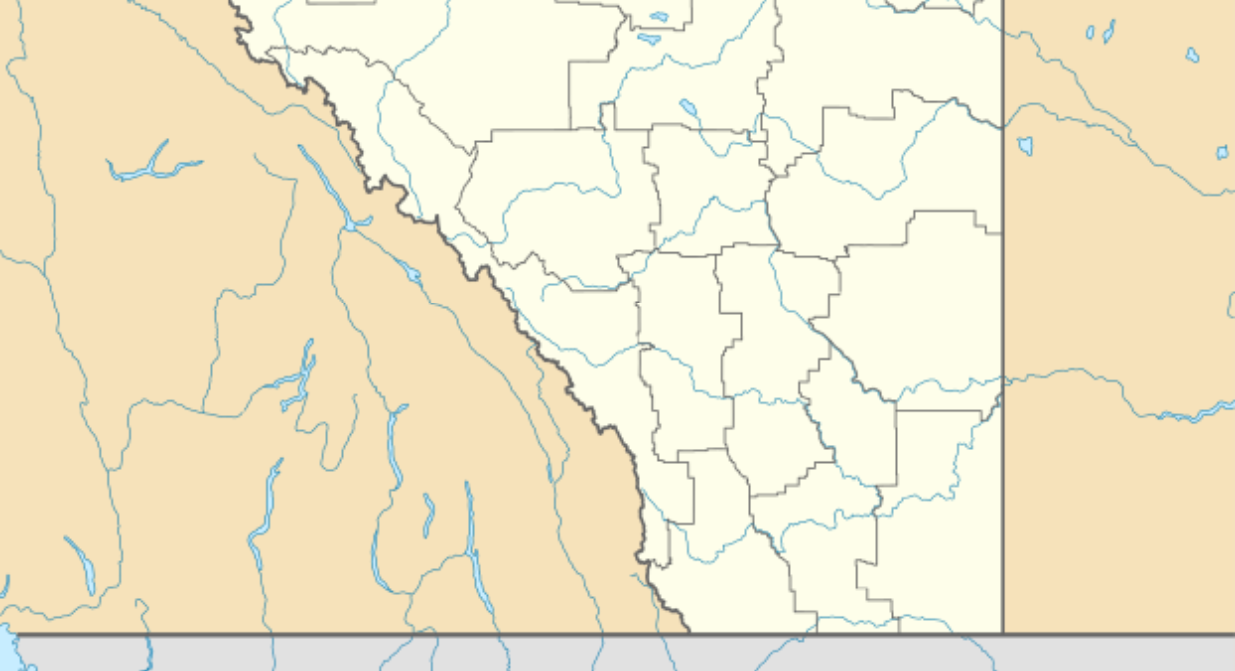
Temples in Alberta

= Operating
= Under construction
= Announced
= Temporarily Closed

- Temple (LDS Church)
- List of temples (LDS Church)
- List of temples by geographic region (LDS Church)
- Comparison of temples (LDS Church)
- Temple architecture (LDS Church)
- The Church of Jesus Christ of Latter-day Saints in Canada

== Additional reading ==
- Stahle, Shaun (January 29, 2000), "Distinguished as doers and dreamers", Church News
- Stahle, Shaun (November 20, 1999), "Historic Sabbath in Canada", Church News
- Stahle, Shaun (November 13, 1999), "Thousands attend temple open houses in Canada", Church News
- "'What a happy day' as 700 attend Halifax temple ceremony", Church News, October 17, 1998
