= The Church of Jesus Christ of Latter-day Saints in Canada =

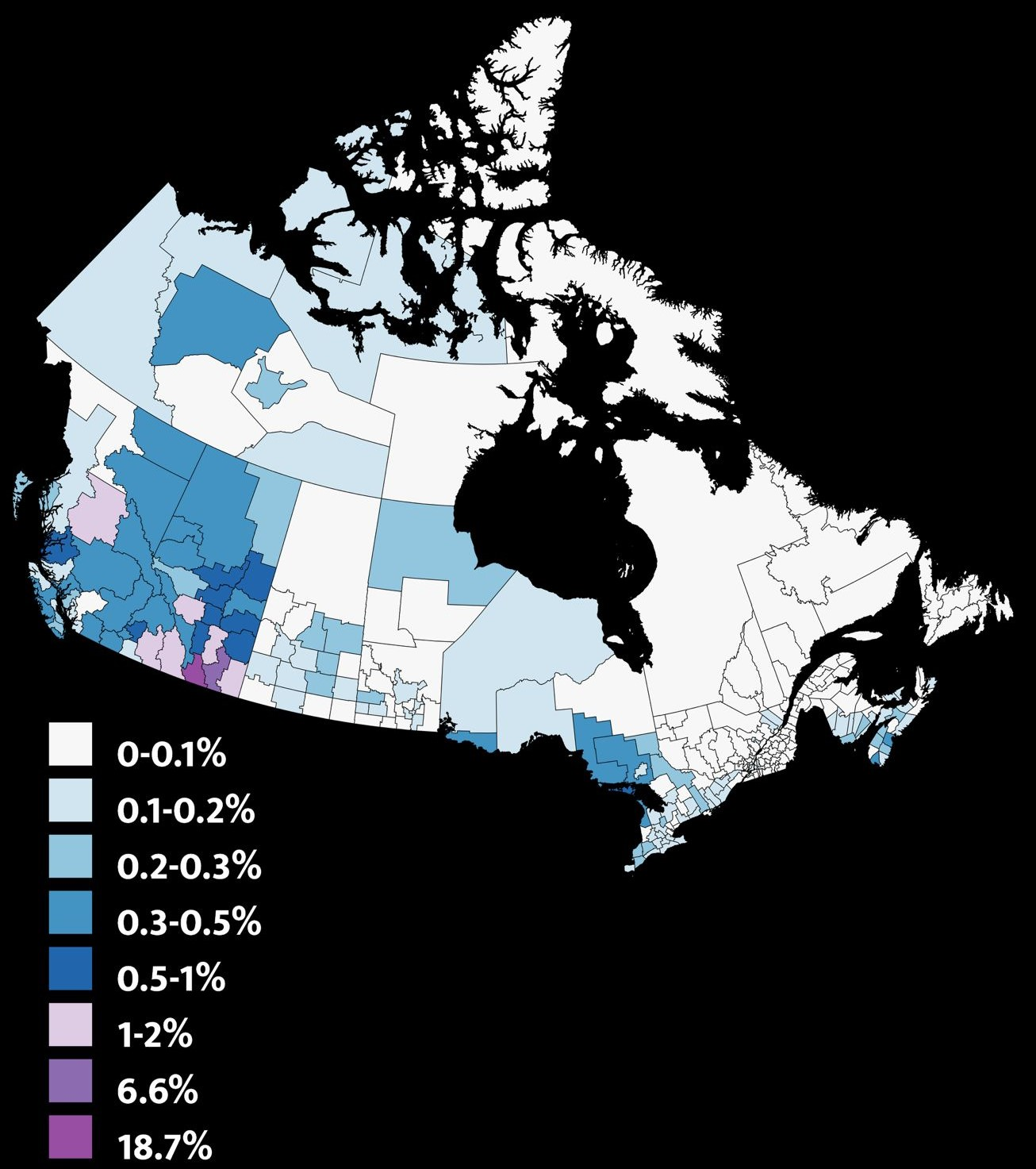
- Population distribution of Mormon Canadians by census division, 2021 census
- Area: Canada; US West (Yukon Territory only)
- Members: 211,581 (2025)
- Stakes: 56
- Districts: 3
- Wards: 359
- Branches: 142
- Total Congregations: 501
- Missions: 6
- Temples: 9 operating; 1 under construction; 1 announced; 11 total
- FamilySearch Centers: 115

Since its organization in New York in 1830, the Church of Jesus Christ of Latter-day Saints (LDS Church) has had a presence in Canada. Several church-related items that were the first of their kind outside the United States include: missionaries preaching (Upper Canada), establishment of a stake (Alberta Stake), and construction of a temple (Cardston Alberta Temple).

With the church reporting more than 200,000 members at year-end 2024, Canada ranks as having the 4th largest body of LDS Church members in North America and the 12th worldwide. The 2021 Canadian Census survey reported approximately 0.2% of the population (about 87,725 people) identified themselves as church members.

== Early missionary contacts ==
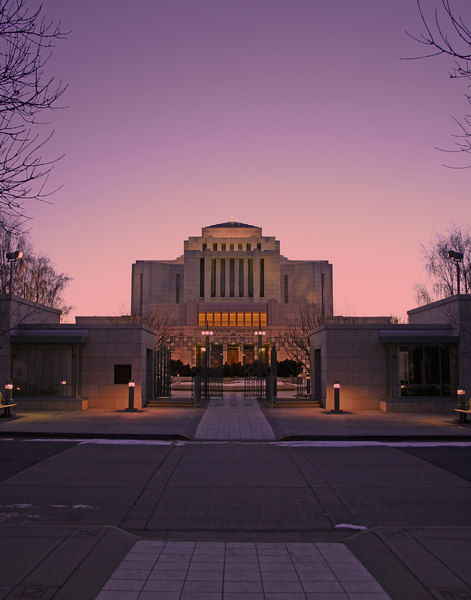
The Cardston Alberta Temple is the oldest and second largest LDS temple outside the United States.

In the winter of 1829–30, Oliver Cowdery and Hiram Page visited Upper Canada while seeking money to finance the publication of the Book of Mormon. After its publication in March 1830, the unbaptized convert, Phineas Young, preached in Ernestown Township, Ontario.

Joseph Smith and Don Carlos Smith—the first official Latter Day Saint missionaries to preach outside of the United States—visited Upper Canada in September 1830 and preached in villages north of the St. Lawrence River. In January 1832, converts Brigham and Phineas Young went to Upper Canada to convince their brother, Joseph to join the church. After Joseph's baptism, the Young brothers taught their family and friends in Canada and baptized over 150 individuals and established four branches of the church, including ones in Kingston and Sydenham.

Joseph Smith preached in Upper Canada in September 1833 with Sidney Rigdon and Freeman Nickerson. Also in 1833, future apostle, Lyman E. Johnson, preached in New Brunswick and Nova Scotia. Later, John E. Page and apostle Parley P. Pratt served successful missions to Upper Canada; Page baptized over 1,000 individuals between 1834 and 1836 and Pratt converted a number of individuals who would play a prominent role in the church, including John Taylor, Joseph and Mary Fielding, and William Law.

By 1850, approximately 2,500 residents of Canada—most of them from Upper Canada—had joined the LDS Church. However, most of these members joined the gathering of the Latter Day Saints in Kirtland, Ohio, Nauvoo, Illinois, and eventually Salt Lake City, Utah, and by 1861, the census of Ontario listed only 73 Mormons.

== Colonization of Alberta ==
In 1887, John Taylor—who was then the church president—sent Charles Ora Card, president of the church's Cache Stake, to Canada's Northwest Territories to establish a LDS Church colony that was beyond the reach of the United States government's anti-polygamy prosecutions. Card led a group of followers and established a settlement along Lee's Creek; the settlement was eventually renamed Cardston in Card's honour. The church's Alberta Stake, the first outside of the United States, was created in 1895, with Card as its president.

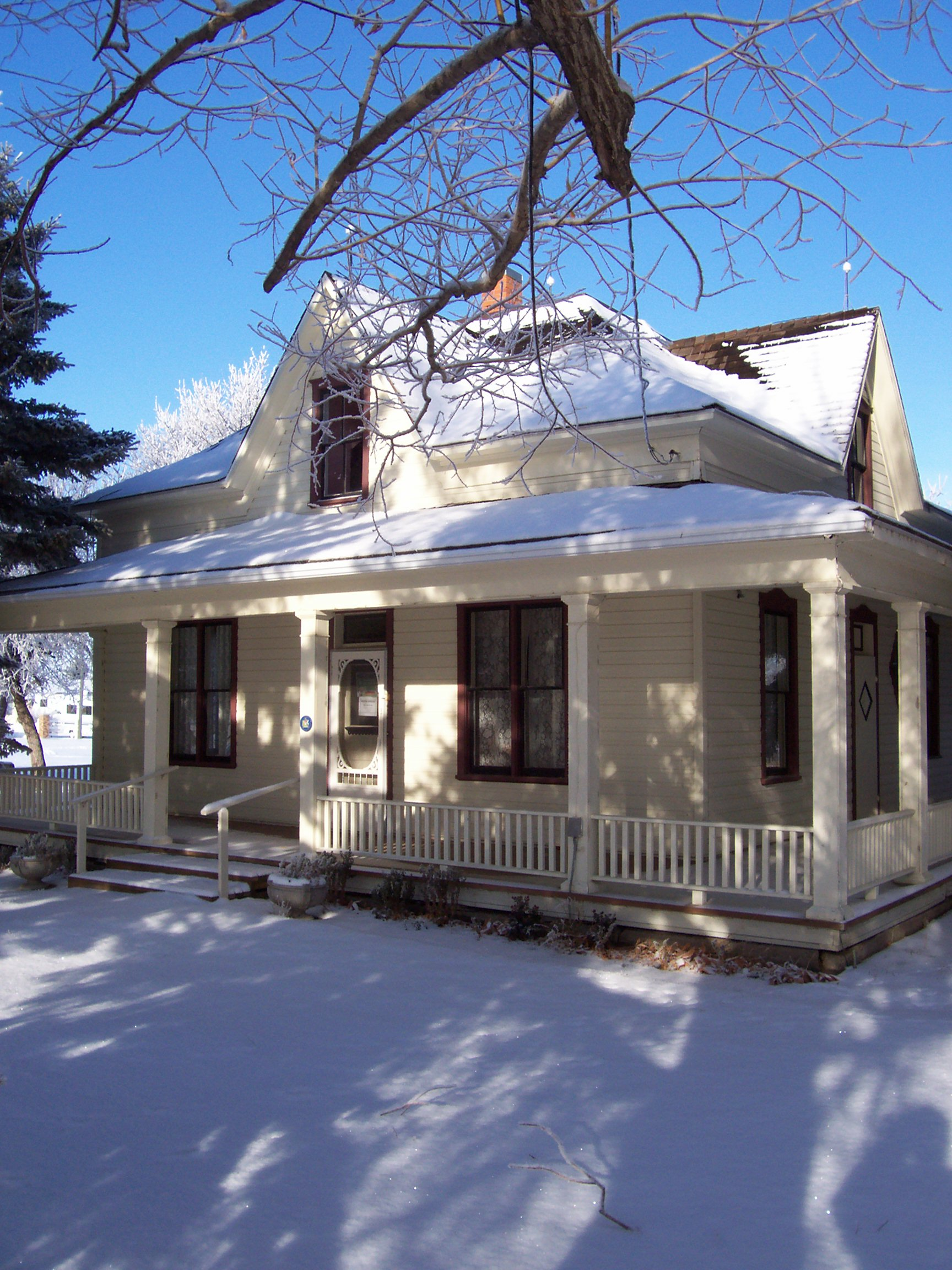
Michelsen Farmstead one of the original Mormon farmsteads in Stirling Agricultural Village

Mormon pioneers continued to colonize what would become Alberta in 1905. Before the turn of the century, Latter-day Saints had founded Mountain View, Aetna, Beazer, Leavitt, Kimball, Caldwell, Taylorville, Magrath, and Stirling. After 1900, colonies of church members were established in Woolford, Welling, Orton, Raymond, Barnwell, Taber, Frankburg, Glenwood, and Hill Spring. Church apostle John W. Taylor—the son of church president John Taylor—played a leadership role in assisting Latter-day Saint emigration from Utah to Alberta.

The Alberta Stake was divided in two in 1903. The Alberta Stake remained headquartered in Cardston and the new Taylor Stake—named in honour of John W. Taylor—was headquartered in Raymond. By 1910, there were about 10,000 Latter-day Saints in southern Alberta and in 1913 the church began construction of a temple in Cardston. In 1924, church president Heber J. Grant dedicated the Cardston Alberta Temple, the church's first outside of the United States. A stake was organized in Lethbridge in 1921.

Stirling, one of Alberta's original Latter-day Saint settlements and a National Historic Site of Canada, was founded by Theodore Brandley in 1899, and is one of few towns in Canada plotted out by the Plat of Zion. Today, Stirling still follows the Plat of Zion; for this reason, the village is recognized as the most well-preserved Canadian example of the Latter-day Saint planning model.

== Beyond Alberta and today ==
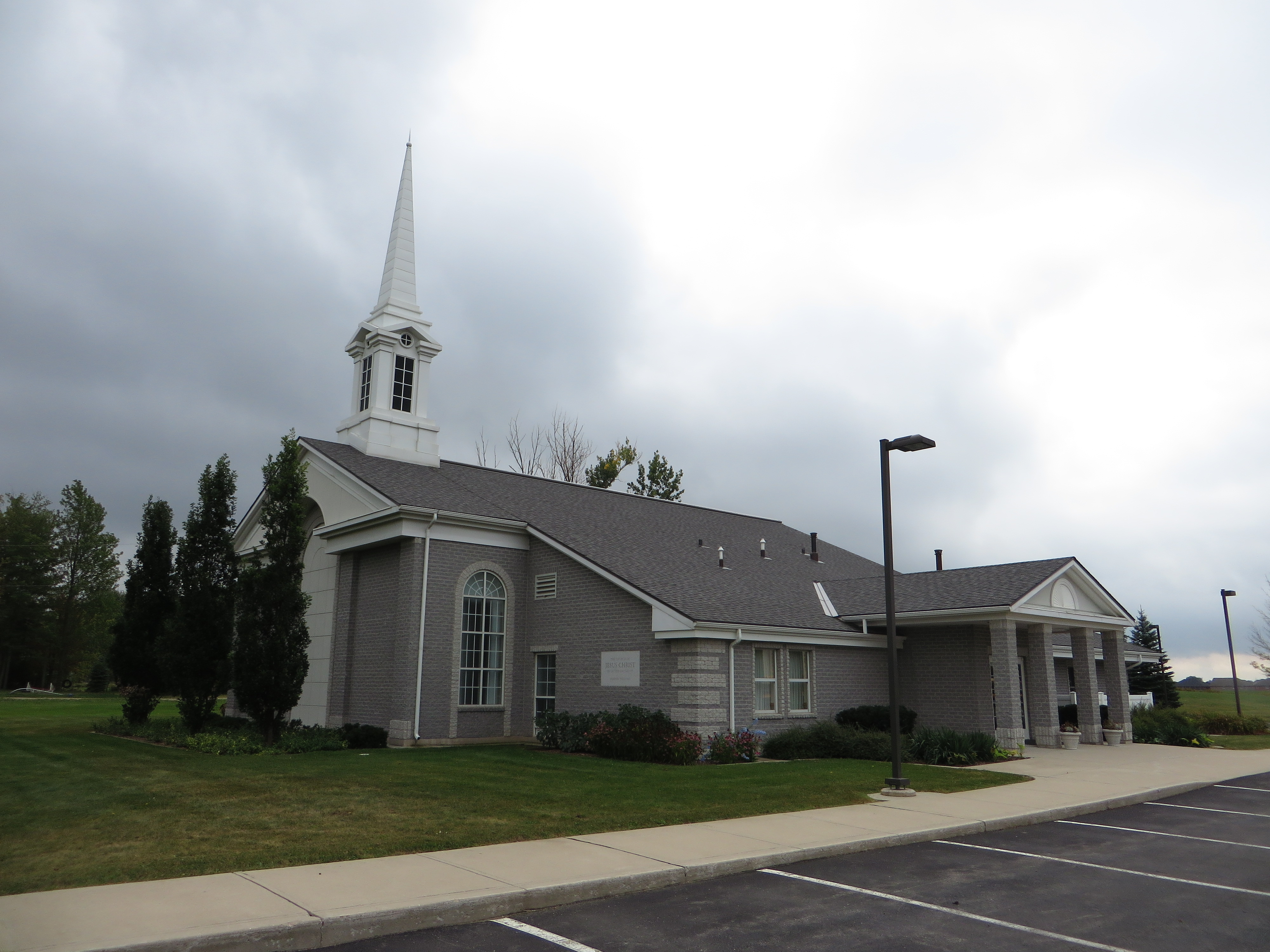
An LDS Meetinghouse in Stratford, Ontario

A branch of the church was organized in Edmonton in 1933, with the Edmonton Stake established in 1960. The Calgary Stake was established in 1953. In 1960, Alberta resident N. Eldon Tanner was called as a church general authority; he became a member of the Quorum of the Twelve Apostles in 1962 and a member of the First Presidency in 1963.

In 1998, a temple was announced for Edmonton and in December 1999 church president Gordon B. Hinckley dedicated the Edmonton Alberta Temple. In 2008, a temple was announced for Calgary by church president Thomas S. Monson. The Calgary Alberta Temple was dedicated in October 2012.

As of December 31, 2021, the LDS Church reported 199,534 members, 53 stakes, 352 wards, 4 districts, 147 branches, 6 missions, 9 temples, and 152 Family History Centers in Canada.

As of 2024, the LDS Church has 502 congregations in 322 locations in Canada.

In Canada, the church's Aid Fund donated C$185,000 to a newly rebuilt food bank in Medicine Hat, Alberta in February 2022. The money will help fund one commercial and two teaching kitchens in the Root Cellar Food and Wellness Hub.

In October 2022, the church's charitable practices attracted media coverage from the Canadian Broadcasting Corporation's The Fifth Estate, which reported that the Canadian LDS Church had funneled almost C$1 billion over the past 15 years into the LDS Church's US-based Brigham Young University, rather than supporting charitable activities in Canada. The majority of these funds came from tithing of church members who tithe ten percent of their income. Under Canadian tax law, the Canadian LDS Church qualifies for tax-free status as a charitable entity. Canadian charities are allowed to donate to foreign charities and universities on the condition that those institutions are registered as "qualified donees" with the Canada Revenue Agency.

== Geographical distribution ==
Data from this section from Statistics Canada, 2021.

=== Provinces & territories ===
Province / Territory	Percent Latter Day Saints	Total Latter Day Saints
Alberta	1.1%	47,125
British Columbia	0.3%	12,875
Manitoba	0.1%	1,640
New Brunswick	0.1%	800
Newfoundland and Labrador	0.0%	170
Northwest Territories	0.2%	85
Nova Scotia	0.2%	1,685
Nunavut	0.1%	25
Ontario	0.1%	16,420
Prince Edward Island	0.1%	175
Quebec	0.1%	4,600
Saskatchewan	0.2%	2,060
Yukon	0.2%	70
Canada — Total	0.2%	87,725

== Stakes and districts ==
As of July 2026, Canada had the following stakes and districts:

Stake/District	Organized	Mission	Temple
Juneau Alaska (Note: Stake located outside Canada with congregation(s) meeting in Canada)	8 Oct 1995	Alaska Anchorage	Anchorage Alaska
Airdrie Alberta Stake	17 Apr 1966	Canada Calgary	Calgary Alberta
Beaumont Alberta Stake	21 Sep 2025	Canada Edmonton	Edmonton Alberta
Calgary Alberta Stake	15 Nov 1953	Canada Calgary	Calgary Alberta
Calgary Alberta Bow River Stake	6 Dec 2015	Canada Calgary	Calgary Alberta
Calgary Alberta Fish Creek Stake	3 Feb 1980	Canada Calgary	Calgary Alberta
Calgary Alberta Nose Hill Stake	9 Nov 2025	Canada Calgary	Calgary Alberta
Calgary Alberta Prairie Winds Stake	14 Feb 1993	Canada Calgary	Calgary Alberta
Calgary Alberta West Stake	27 May 1979	Canada Calgary	Calgary Alberta
Calgary Alberta YSA Stake	5 May 2019	Canada Calgary	Calgary Alberta
Cardston Alberta Stake	9 Jun 1895	Canada Calgary	Cardston Alberta
Cardston Alberta West Stake	13 Nov 1983	Canada Calgary	Cardston Alberta
Edmonton Alberta Bonnie Doon Stake	3 Nov 1974	Canada Edmonton	Edmonton Alberta
Edmonton Alberta Gateway Stake	6 Nov 1983	Canada Edmonton	Edmonton Alberta
Edmonton Alberta North Stake	9 Sep 2001	Canada Edmonton	Edmonton Alberta
Edmonton Alberta Riverbend Stake	15 Nov 1960	Canada Edmonton	Edmonton Alberta
Edmonton Alberta YSA Stake	11 Oct 2020	Canada Edmonton	Edmonton Alberta
Fort Macleod Alberta Stake	29 Sep 1985	Canada Calgary	Cardston Alberta
Grande Prairie Alberta Stake	12 Apr 1998	Canada Edmonton	Edmonton Alberta
Lethbridge Alberta Henderson Lake Stake	4 May 2025	Canada Calgary	Cardston Alberta
Lethbridge Alberta North Stake	26 Oct 1997	Canada Calgary	Cardston Alberta
Lethbridge Alberta South Stake	24 Nov 1974	Canada Calgary	Cardston Alberta
Lethbridge Alberta West Stake	10 Nov 1921	Canada Calgary	Cardston Alberta
Lethbridge Alberta YSA Stake	27 Aug 2017	Canada Calgary	Cardston Alberta
Magrath Alberta Stake	26 Oct 1980	Canada Calgary	Cardston Alberta
Medicine Hat Alberta Stake	20 Nov 1994	Canada Calgary	Cardston Alberta
Okotoks Alberta Stake	5 Dec 1999	Canada Calgary	Calgary Alberta
Raymond Alberta Stake	30 Aug 1903	Canada Calgary	Cardston Alberta
Red Deer Alberta Stake	13 Jun 1982	Canada Edmonton	Edmonton Alberta
Sherwood Park Alberta Stake	9 Apr 2017	Canada Edmonton	Edmonton Alberta
Spruce Grove Alberta Stake	24 May 2026	Canada Edmonton	Edmonton Alberta
Taber Alberta Stake	11 Sep 1960	Canada Calgary	Cardston Alberta
Abbotsford British Columbia Stake	12 Jun 1994	Canada Vancouver	Vancouver British Columbia
Cranbrook British Columbia Stake	14 Jan 1979	Canada Calgary	Cardston Alberta
Nanaimo British Columbia Stake	26 Oct 1997	Canada Vancouver	Vancouver British Columbia
Prince George British Columbia Stake	8 Apr 1979	Canada Vancouver	Vancouver British Columbia
Surrey British Columbia Stake	8 Apr 1979	Canada Vancouver	Vancouver British Columbia
Vancouver British Columbia Stake	21 Nov 1960	Canada Vancouver	Vancouver British Columbia
Vernon British Columbia Stake	12 Oct 1975	Canada Vancouver	Vancouver British Columbia
Victoria British Columbia Stake	9 Feb 1975	Canada Vancouver	Vancouver British Columbia
Winnipeg Manitoba East Stake	12 Nov 1978	Canada Winnipeg	Winnipeg Manitoba
Winnipeg Manitoba West Stake	14 Nov 2021	Canada Winnipeg	Winnipeg Manitoba
Saint John New Brunswick Stake	26 Jun 1988	Canada Halifax	Halifax Nova Scotia
Newfoundland and Labrador District	30 Jul 1978	Canada Halifax	Halifax Nova Scotia
Dartmouth Nova Scotia Stake	12 May 1985	Canada Halifax	Halifax Nova Scotia
Barrie Ontario Stake	19 Feb 2012	Canada Toronto East	Toronto Ontario
Brampton Ontario Stake	11 Jan 1981	Canada Toronto West	Toronto Ontario
Hamilton Ontario Stake	6 Sep 1970	Canada Toronto West	Toronto Ontario
Kingston Ontario District	10 Jun 1996	Canada Toronto East	Toronto Ontario
Kitchener Ontario Stake	22 Jun 1986	Canada Toronto West	Toronto Ontario
London Ontario Stake	11 Apr 1976	Canada Toronto West	Toronto Ontario
Oshawa Ontario Stake	13 Jun 1976	Canada Toronto East	Toronto Ontario
Ottawa Ontario Stake	12 Dec 1976	Canada Toronto East	Montreal Quebec
Sudbury Ontario Stake	5 May 1996	Canada Toronto East	Toronto Ontario
Toronto Ontario Stake	14 Aug 1960	Canada Toronto West	Toronto Ontario
Longueuil Québec Stake	7 May 2006	Canada Montreal	Montreal Quebec
Montréal Québec Stake	18 Jun 1978	Canada Montreal	Montreal Quebec
Montréal Québec Mount Royal Stake	6 Jul 1980	Canada Montreal	Montreal Quebec
Québec City District	27 Mar 1977	Canada Montreal	Montreal Quebec
Regina Saskatchewan Stake	27 Oct 2001	Canada Winnipeg	Regina Saskatchewan
Saskatoon Saskatchewan Stake	5 Nov 1978	Canada Winnipeg	Regina Saskatchewan

== Missions ==
Mission	Organized
Canada Calgary Mission	15 Sep 1941
Canada Edmonton Mission	1 Jul 1998
Canada Halifax Mission	1 Jul 2026
Canada Montreal Mission	1 Jul 1972
Canada Toronto East Mission	1 Jul 2026
Canada Toronto West Mission	1 Jul 1919
Canada Vancouver Mission	21 Nov 1960
Canada Winnipeg Mission	15 Feb 1976

== Temples ==
There are 9 temples operating in Canada and two announced to be constructed.

Temples in Canada

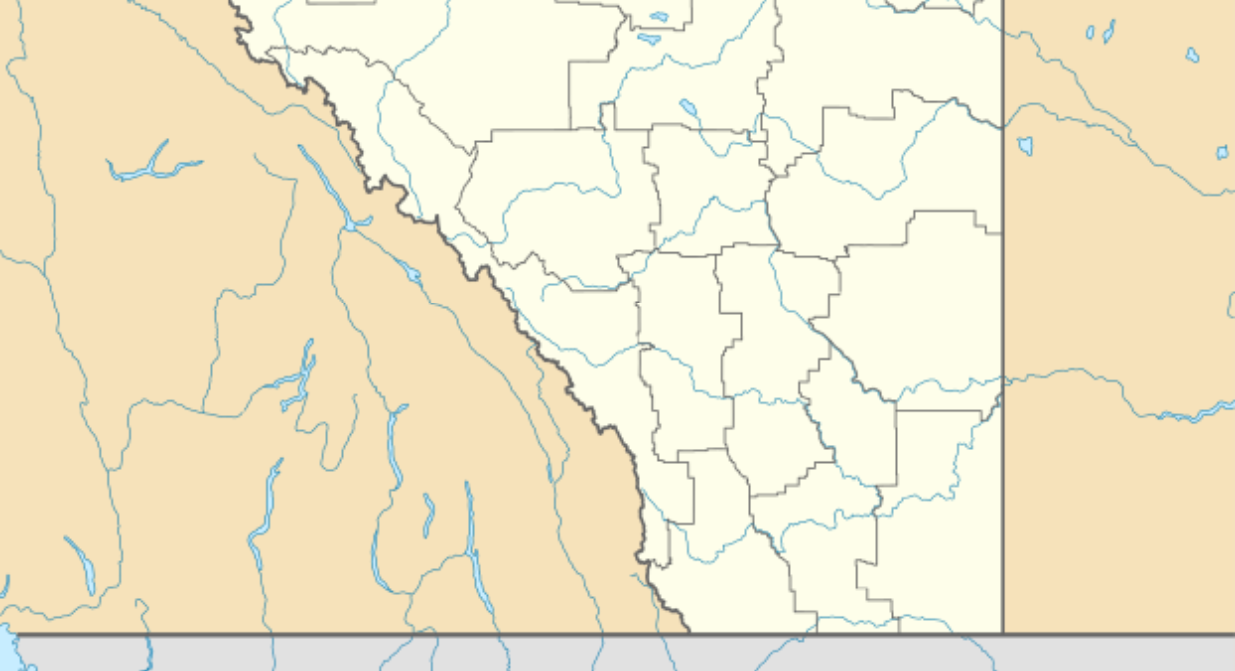

Temples in Alberta
= Operating
= Under construction
= Announced
= Temporarily Closed

6. Cardston Alberta Temple; Official website; News & images	
Location: Announced: Groundbreaking: Dedicated: Rededicated: Size: Notes:	Cardston, Alberta, Canada; 27 June 1913 by Joseph F. Smith; 13 November 1913 by Daniel Kent Greene; 26 August 1923 by Heber J. Grant; 2 July 1962 by Hugh B. Brown; 88,562 sq ft (8,227.7 m^{2}) on a 10-acre (4.0 ha) site - designed by Hyrum Pope and Harold W. Burton; An addition was completed in 1962 and was dedicated on July 2, 1962 by Hugh B. Brown.
44. Toronto Ontario Temple; Official website; News & images	
Location: Announced: Groundbreaking: Dedicated: Rededicated: Size: Style:	Brampton, Ontario, Canada; 7 April 1984 by Spencer W. Kimball; 10 October 1987 by Thomas S. Monson; 25 August 1990 by Gordon B. Hinckley; 23 March 2025 by Jeffrey R. Holland; 55,558 sq ft (5,161.5 m^{2}) on a 13.4-acre (5.4 ha) site Modern, single-spire design - designed by Allward-Gouinlock Inc.
64. Halifax Nova Scotia Temple; Official website; News & images	
Location: Announced: Groundbreaking: Dedicated: Size: Style:	Dartmouth, Nova Scotia, Canada; 7 May 1998 by Gordon B. Hinckley; 12 October 1998 by Jay E. Jensen; 14 November 1999 by Gordon B. Hinckley; 10,700 sq ft (990 m^{2}) on a 2-acre (0.81 ha) site Classic modern, single spire design - designed by L.A. Beaubien and Associates, and Church A&E Services
65. Regina Saskatchewan Temple; Official website; News & images	
Location: Announced: Groundbreaking: Dedicated: Size: Style:	Regina, Saskatchewan, Canada; 3 August 1998 by Gordon B. Hinckley; 14 November 1998 by Hugh W. Pinnock; 14 November 1999 by Boyd K. Packer; 10,700 sq ft (990 m^{2}) on a 1-acre (0.40 ha) site Classic modern, single-spire design - designed by Roger B. Mitchell and Church A&E Services
67. Edmonton Alberta Temple; Official website; News & images	
Location: Announced: Groundbreaking: Dedicated: Size: Style:	Edmonton, Alberta, Canada; 11 August 1998 by Gordon B. Hinckley; 27 February 1999 by Yoshihiko Kikuchi; 11 December 1999 by Gordon B. Hinckley; 10,700 sq ft (990 m^{2}) on a 1-acre (0.40 ha) site Classic modern, single-spire design - designed by Robert Bennett and Church A&E Services
86. Montreal Quebec Temple; Official website; News & images	
Location: Announced: Groundbreaking: Dedicated: Rededicated: Size: Style:	Longueuil, Quebec, Canada; 6 August 1998 by Gordon B. Hinckley; 9 April 1999 by Gary J. Coleman; 4 June 2000 by Gordon B. Hinckley; 22 November 2015 by Henry B. Eyring; 11,550 sq ft (1,073 m^{2}) on a 2.4-acre (0.97 ha) site Classic modern, single-spire design - designed by Andrij Serbyn, Fichten Soiferman and Church A&E Services
131. Vancouver British Columbia Temple; Official website; News & images	
Location: Announced: Groundbreaking: Dedicated: Size: Notes:	Langley, British Columbia, Canada; 25 May 2006 by Gordon B. Hinckley; 4 August 2007 by Ronald A. Rasband; 2 May 2010 by Thomas S. Monson; 28,165 sq ft (2,616.6 m^{2}) on a 11.6-acre (4.7 ha) site - designed by Abbarch Architecture and GSBS; Open house was held in April and the dedication 2 May 2010. First temple in British Columbia and 6th in Canada.
140. Calgary Alberta Temple; Official website; News & images	
Location: Announced: Groundbreaking: Dedicated: Size: Notes:	Calgary, Canada; 4 October 2008 by Thomas S. Monson; 15 May 2010 by Donald L. Hallstrom; 28 October 2012 by Thomas S. Monson; 33,000 sq ft (3,100 m^{2}) on a 10.17-acre (4.12 ha) site Announced at the 178th Semiannual General Conference.
169. Winnipeg Manitoba Temple; Official website; News & images	
Location: Announced: Groundbreaking: Dedicated: Size: Notes:	Winnipeg, Manitoba, Canada; April 2, 2011 by Thomas S. Monson; December 3, 2016 by Larry Y. Wilson; 31 October 2021 by Gerrit W. Gong; 16,100 sq ft (1,500 m^{2}) on a 7.7-acre (3.1 ha) site Dedication originally scheduled for November 2020, but was postponed due to the COVID-19 pandemic. Revised arrangements were announced on August 30, 2021.
258. Lethbridge Alberta Temple (Under construction); Official website; News & images	
Location: Announced: Groundbreaking: Size:	Lethbridge, Alberta, Canada; 2 April 2023 by Russell M. Nelson; 26 April 2025 by Randall K. Bennett; 45,000 sq ft (4,200 m^{2}) on a 9-acre (3.6 ha) site
285. Victoria British Columbia Temple (Groundbreaking scheduled); Official website; News & images	
Location: Announced: Groundbreaking: Size:	Langford, British Columbia, Canada; 7 April 2024 by Russell M. Nelson scheduled for 22 August 2026 by James E. Evanson; 11,400 sq ft (1,060 m^{2}) on a 4.7-acre (1.9 ha) site

== Communities ==
Latter-day Saints have had a significant role in establishing and settling communities within the "Mormon Corridor" and other locations, including the following in Alberta, Canada:

- Altorado
- Barnwell
- Bow Island
- Cardston
- Del Bonita
- Ensign
- Glenwood
- Hill Spring
- Jefferson
- Kimball
- Lundbreck
- Magrath
- Pincher Creek
- Raley
- Raymond
- Seven Persons
- Stirling
- Taber
- Welling
- Woolford

== See also ==
- Canada membership statistics (LDS Church)
- Edward J. Wood
- Latter-day Saint settlements in Canada
- Mormon corridor
- Mormon Trail (Canada)
- Fundamentalist Church of Jesus Christ of Latter-Day Saints
- Mormon fundamentalism

== Additional reading ==
- Richard E. Bennett, “Canada: From Struggling Seed, the Church Has Risen to Branching Maple,” Ensign, September 1988, p. 30.
- B. Y. Card (ed.) (1990). The Mormon Presence in Canada (Edmonton, Alta: University of Alberta Press) ISBN 0-88864-212-1
- Lethbridge Stake (1968). A History of the Mormon Church in Canada (Lethbridge, Alta.: Lethbridge Stake)
- Melvin S. Tagg (1963). A History of the Church of Jesus Christ of Latter-day Saints in Canada, 1830–1963 (Ph.D. dissertation, Brigham Young University)
- Bennett, Richard E. (1992), "Canada, The Church in", in Ludlow, Daniel H (ed.), Encyclopedia of Mormonism, New York: Macmillan Publishing, pp. 251–252, ISBN 0-02-879602-0, OCLC 24502140.
- Palmer, Howard (1992), "Canada, LDS Pioneer Settlements in", in Ludlow, Daniel H (ed.), Encyclopedia of Mormonism, New York: Macmillan Publishing, pp. 252–254, ISBN 0-02-879602-0, OCLC 24502140.
- Wright, Dennis A.; Robert C. Freeman; Andrew H. Hedges; Matthew O. Richardson (2000). Regional Studies in Latter-day Saint Church History: Western Canada. Provo, Utah: Department of Church History and Doctrine, Brigham Young University. ISBN 0-8425-2395-2.
