= Regina Saskatchewan Temple =

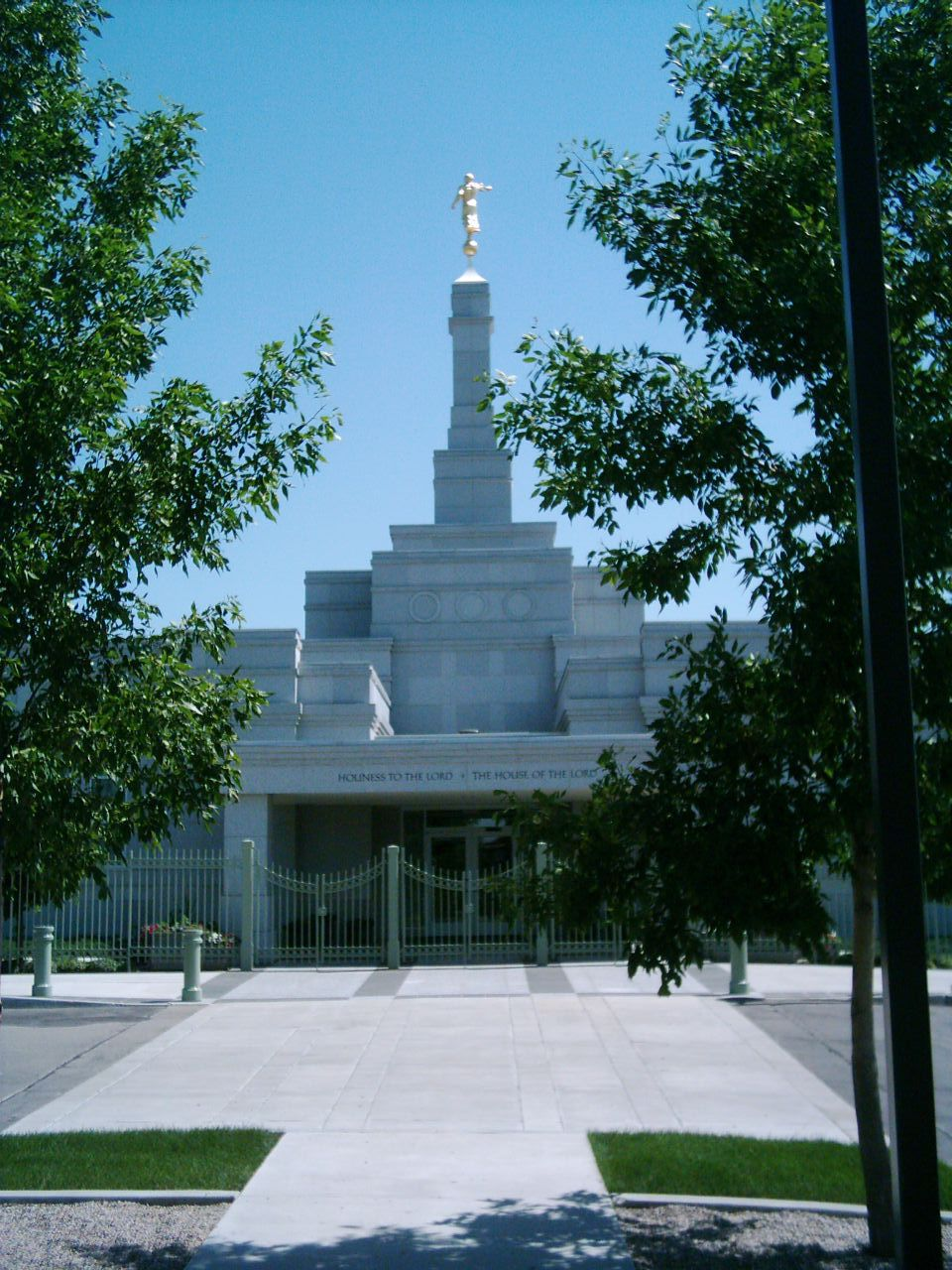
- Interactive map of Regina Saskatchewan Temple
- Number: 65
- Dedication: 14 November 1999, by Boyd K. Packer
- Site: 1 acre (0.40 ha)
- Floor area: 10,700 ft^{2} (990 m^{2})
- Height: 71 ft (22 m)
- Official website • News & images

Church chronology
← Halifax Nova Scotia Temple	Regina Saskatchewan Temple	→ Billings Montana Temple

Additional information
- Announced: 3 August 1998, by Gordon B. Hinckley
- Groundbreaking: 14 November 1998, by Hugh W. Pinnock
- Open house: 5–6 November 1999
- Current president: Doug Robertson
- Designed by: Roger B. Mitchell and Church A&E Services
- Location: Regina, Saskatchewan, Canada
- Coordinates: 50°25′15.53159″N 104°32′30.04799″W
- Exterior finish: Light gray granite
- Design: Classic modern, single-spire design
- Baptistries: 1
- Ordinance rooms: 2 (two-stage progressive)
- Sealing rooms: 2

The Regina Saskatchewan Temple is a temple of the Church of Jesus Christ of Latter-day Saints in Regina, Saskatchewan, Canada. The intent to build the temple was announced on August 3, 1998, by church president Gordon B. Hinckley while traveling in Canada. The temple is the first in Saskatchewan and the fourth in Canada. The temple was dedicated on November 14, 1999, by Boyd K. Packer, acting president of the Quorum of the Twelve Apostles. It was the first time in church history that two temples were dedicated on the same day.

The 10,700-square-foot structure is constructed of light gray granite and is on 3.2 acres of land. A seven-foot angel Moroni statue sits on top of the temple spire. The temple was designed by Roger B. Mitchell of Banadyga Mitchell Partnership and church architectural and engineering employees, using a classic modern style.

A groundbreaking ceremony was held on November 14, 1998, conducted by Hugh W. Pinnock, a general authority and president of the church's North America Central Area. The temple faced significant construction challenges, including a truckers' strike that delayed materials until days before the dedication, requiring crews to work around the clock to complete the exterior.

== History ==
The Regina Saskatchewan Temple was announced by church president Gordon B. Hinckley on August 3, 1998, during a nine-day trip through Canada. During the trip, Hinckley and Boyd K. Packer met with local members, and Packer later commented that they were "greatly impressed with the reverence and dedication of the people."

The groundbreaking ceremony took place on November 14, 1998, exactly one year before the dedication. Hugh W. Pinnock of the Seventy, who was serving as president of the North America Central Area, presided over the ceremony. Despite cold November weather, 480 people attended the groundbreaking.

The temple is located in the Wascana View neighborhood in the southeast corner of Regina on Wascana Creek, near the University of Regina.

Construction of the temple faced significant challenges during its final stages. Due to a truckers' strike, necessary materials did not arrive until a few days before the dedication. Granite facing was being set 24 hours a day right up to the night before the dedication. The week between the open house and dedication, crews worked around the clock to finish the temple's exterior and landscaping.

On Saturday, November 13, 1999, a group of more than 100 missionaries, youth, and adult church members laid 18,000 square feet of sod, planted trees, and raised the granite sign in front of the temple. A tri-zone conference of the Canada Winnipeg Mission was canceled that morning so that 60 missionaries could assist with the landscaping.

A public open house was held on November 5 and November 6, 1999. Two days prior, special VIP tours were conducted by general authority Donald L. Staheli and local church leaders. During the tours, Staheli noted the interest in the sealing rooms. Regina Mayor Doug Archer visited the temple on November 4, stating he felt "rather honored" to be included in the celebration. During the open house, 8,460 people toured the temple.

Originally, Hinckley was scheduled to dedicate the temple on Saturday, November 13, 1999, followed by the dedication of the Halifax Nova Scotia Temple on Sunday, November 14. However, plans were altered on November 12 when technicians were unable to repair mechanical difficulties with the airplane that was to carry Hinckley to Nova Scotia. The resulting one-day postponement of the Halifax dedication led to the decision to hold both dedications on the same day out of consideration for the travel demands placed upon members attending the dedications.

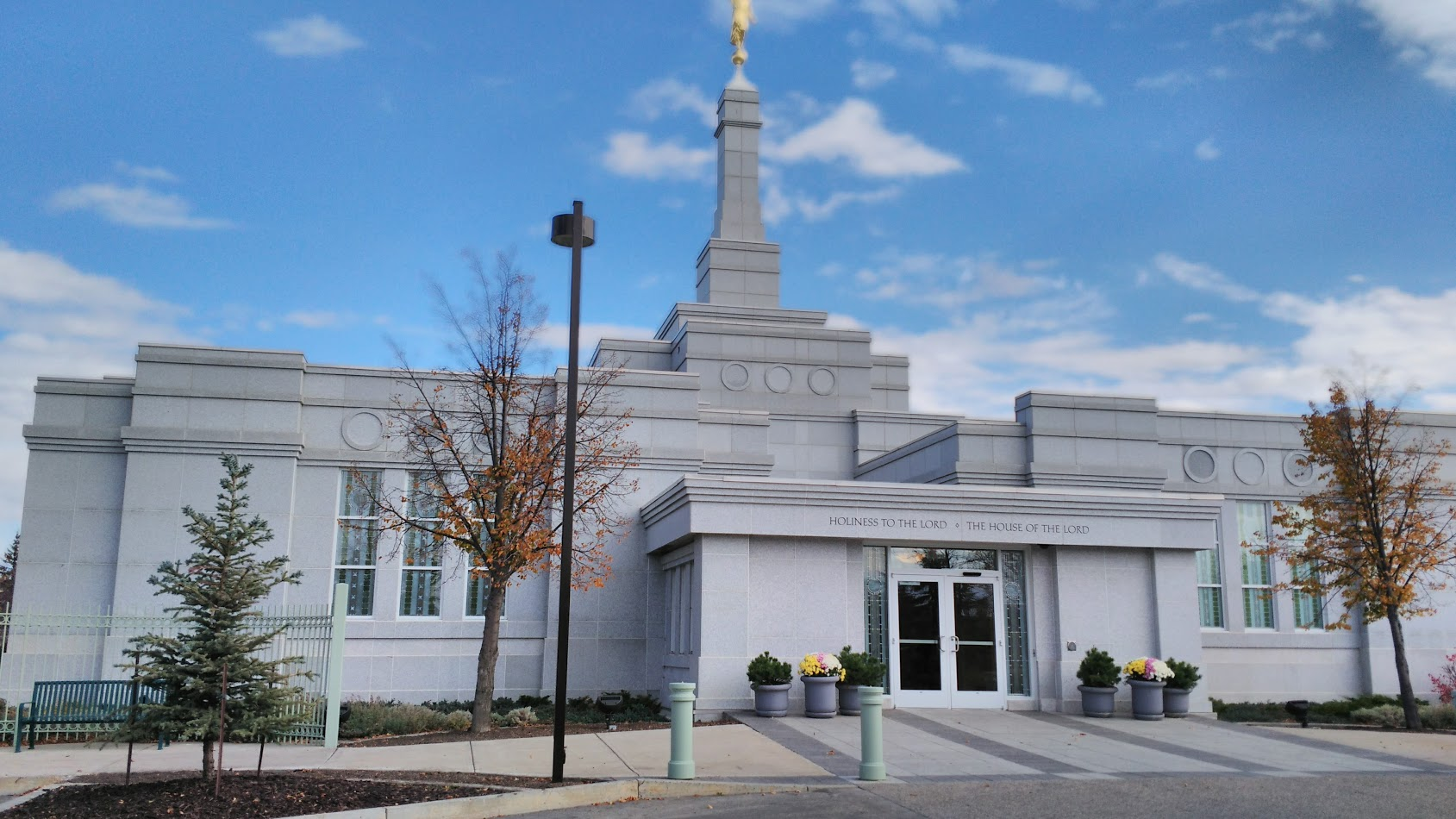
The Regina Saskatchewan Temple around October 2017.

The Regina Saskatchewan Temple was dedicated on November 14, 1999, by Boyd K. Packer, acting president of the Quorum of the Twelve Apostles, in three sessions. Hinckley dedicated the Halifax Nova Scotia Temple on the same day. This was the first time in church history that two temples were dedicated on the same day. It was also the first time since the Manti Utah Temple in 1888 by Lorenzo Snow that a temple was not dedicated by a member of the church's First Presidency.

The three dedicatory sessions were attended by 2,020 members. Many attendees traveled hundreds of miles to attend, with some driving up to seven hours to reach Regina. Attending the dedicatory sessions with Packer were general authority Donald L. Staheli, area seventy Blair S. Bennett, R. Dean Layton, president of the Canada Winnipeg Mission, and temple president Lorin J. Mendenhall.

Packer placed mortar on the temple's cornerstone along with other church leaders to signify the completion of the temple. A 30-voice choir, sang "Let the Mountains Shout for Joy" and "How Great Thou Art" during the cornerstone ceremony. Packer gave the dedicatory prayer, and after the dedication said that "The Spirit of the Lord was present in great abundance."

At the time of dedication, the temple district included the Province of Saskatchewan, a 252,000-square-mile area in central Canada with a population of 1 million, of whom about 4,500 were church members. The temple district served two stakes and one district in Saskatchewan and Manitoba.

In 2020, like all the church's others, the Regina Saskatchewan Temple was closed for a time in response to the COVID-19 pandemic.

== Design and architecture ==
The Regina Saskatchewan Temple has a classic modern architecture designed by Roger B. Mitchell of Banadyga Mitchell Partnership and church employees. Cory Karl was the project manager, Graham Construction and Engineering, Ltd. being the contractor

The temple is on 3.2 acres of land. The temple is located at 111 Wascana Gate North in Regina, in the Wascana View neighborhood in the southeast corner of the city. Alongside the temple is a meetinghouse that accommodates multiple wards.

The structure is 149 feet by 77 feet and is a 10,700-square-foot building. The exterior has light gray granite, which was installed in the final days before dedication. A seven-foot angel Moroni statue sits on top of the temple spire.

The temple has a baptistry, two ordinance rooms, and two sealing rooms.

== Temple leadership and admittance ==
The church's temples are directed by a temple president and matron, each typically serving for a term of three years. The president and matron oversee the administration of temple operations and provide guidance and training for both temple patrons and staff.

Serving from 1999 to 2003, Lorin J. Mendenhall was the first president, with Mildred A. Mendenhall serving as matron. As of 2024, Douglas W. Robertson is the president, with Donna E. Robertson serving as matron.

=== Admittance ===
A public open house was held on November 5 and 6, 1999. The temple was dedicated by Boyd K. Packer, acting president of the Quorum of the Twelve Apostles, on November 14, 1999, in three sessions.

Like all the church's temples, it is not used for Sunday worship services. To members of the church, temples are regarded as sacred houses of the Lord. Once dedicated, only church members with a current temple recommend can enter for worship. Members of the Church regard temples as sacred houses of the Lord.

== See also ==

Temples in Canada

Alberta Temples
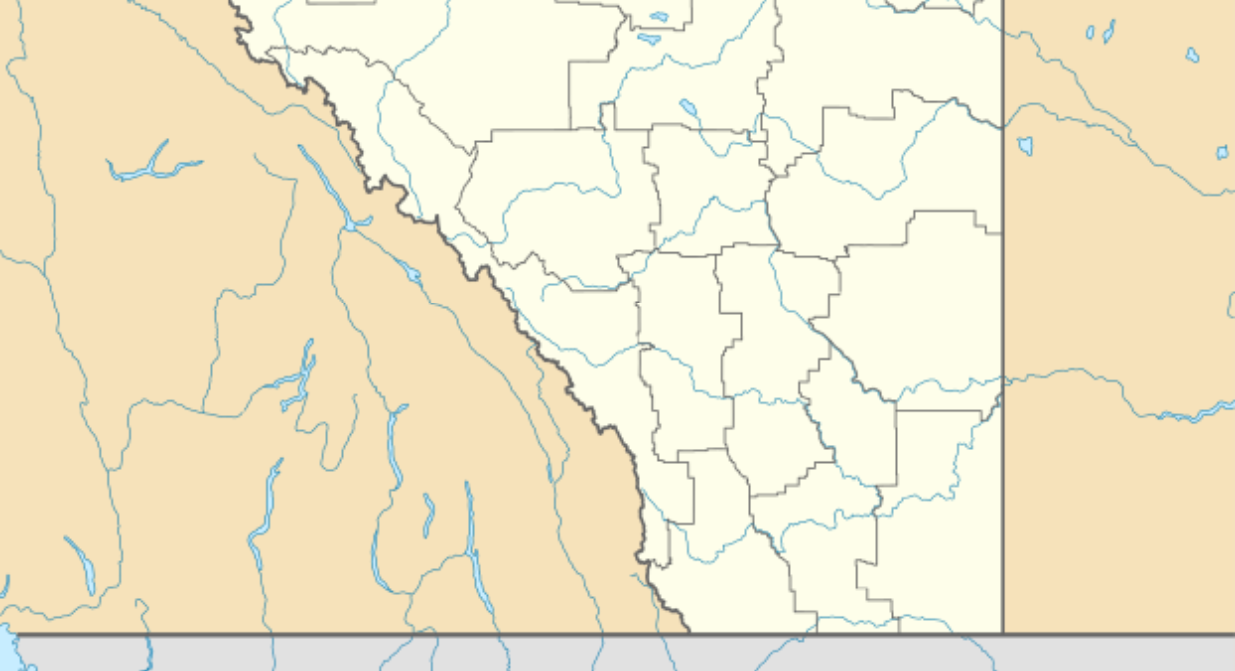
Temples in Alberta

= Operating
= Under construction
= Announced
= Temporarily Closed

- List of temples of The Church of Jesus Christ of Latter-day Saints
- List of temples of The Church of Jesus Christ of Latter-day Saints by geographic region
- Comparison of temples of The Church of Jesus Christ of Latter-day Saints
- Temple architecture (Latter-day Saints)
- The Church of Jesus Christ of Latter-day Saints in Canada

== Additional reading ==
- Kruckenberg, Janet (November 20, 1999), "Regina prairie, now a place of fulfilled dreams", Church News
- Kruckenberg, Janet (November 13, 1999), "Halifax, Regina prepare for dedications of two temples on two consecutive days", Church News
- Lloyd, R. Scott (November 21, 1998), "Ground broken for temple on Canada's plains", Church News
