= Merlin R. Lybbert =

Canadian leader in the Church of Jesus Christ of Latter-day Saints

Second Quorum of the Seventy
- 1 April 1989 – 1 October 1994
- Called by: Ezra Taft Benson
- End reason: Honorably released

Personal details
- Born: Merlin Rex Lybbert; 31 January 1926; Cardston, Alberta, Canada
- Died: July 6, 2001 (aged 75); Salt Lake City, Utah, United States

Merlin Rex Lybbert (31 January 1926 – 6 July 2001) was a Canadian church leader and lawyer who served as a general authority of the Church of Jesus Christ of Latter-day Saints (LDS Church) from 1989 to 1994. From 1992 to 1994, Lybbert was the thirteenth general president of the LDS Church's Sunday School.

Lybbert was born in Cardston, Alberta, Canada to Charles Lester and Delvia Reed Lybbert. His parents homesteaded in Cherry Grove, Alberta where their nearest neighbor was three miles away.

In 1943, Lybbert met his future wife, Nola, at a party. During this time, he was serving in the Royal Canadian Air Force. After completing his military service, Lybbert served as a missionary in the LDS Church's Eastern States Mission. Following his mission, he married Nola in the Cardston Alberta Temple in 1949.

After marrying, the couple moved to Salt Lake City, where Lybbert attended the University of Utah. He received a bachelor's degree in law in 1953, and a Juris Doctor in 1955.

== Legal career ==
Lybbert was an attorney for nearly 35 years before retiring to focus on church service. During his legal career, he served as counsel for the University of Utah Hospital for many years. He was an active member of the Utah State Bar Association and was elected to the American College of Trial Lawyers. In 1981–82, he was honoured as Utah Trial Lawyer of the Year. He also chaired the Advisory Committee to the Utah Supreme Court on the Rules of Professional Practice.

== LDS Church service ==
While in the Eastern States Mission as a young man, Lybbert served as a mission secretary for 16 months before being called as a counsellor in the mission presidency. He later held various leadership roles in the LDS Church, including high councilor, bishop, stake president and regional representative.

Lybbert served as a member of the First Quorum of the Seventy from 1 April 1989 to 1 October 1994. During his tenure as a general authority, Lybbert spoke in the April 1990 and April 1994 general conferences and held several assignments, including president and second counsellor in the Asia Area presidency.

In May 1992, Lybbert and Monte Brough travelled to Mongolia to evaluate the possibility of the LDS Church providing humanitarian assistance. During their visit, they made diplomatic visits to government and educational officials.

Lybbert served as president of the Cardston Alberta Temple from 1994 to 1997.

== Personal life ==
Lybbert and his wife, Nola, had six children, including a daughter, Ruth, who married Dale G. Renlund, who later became a member of the LDS Church's Quorum of the Twelve Apostles.

== Death ==
Lybbert died in Salt Lake City, Utah on 6 July 2001, following a brief illness.
