= Edmonton Alberta Temple =

Latter-day Saint temple in Alberta, Canada

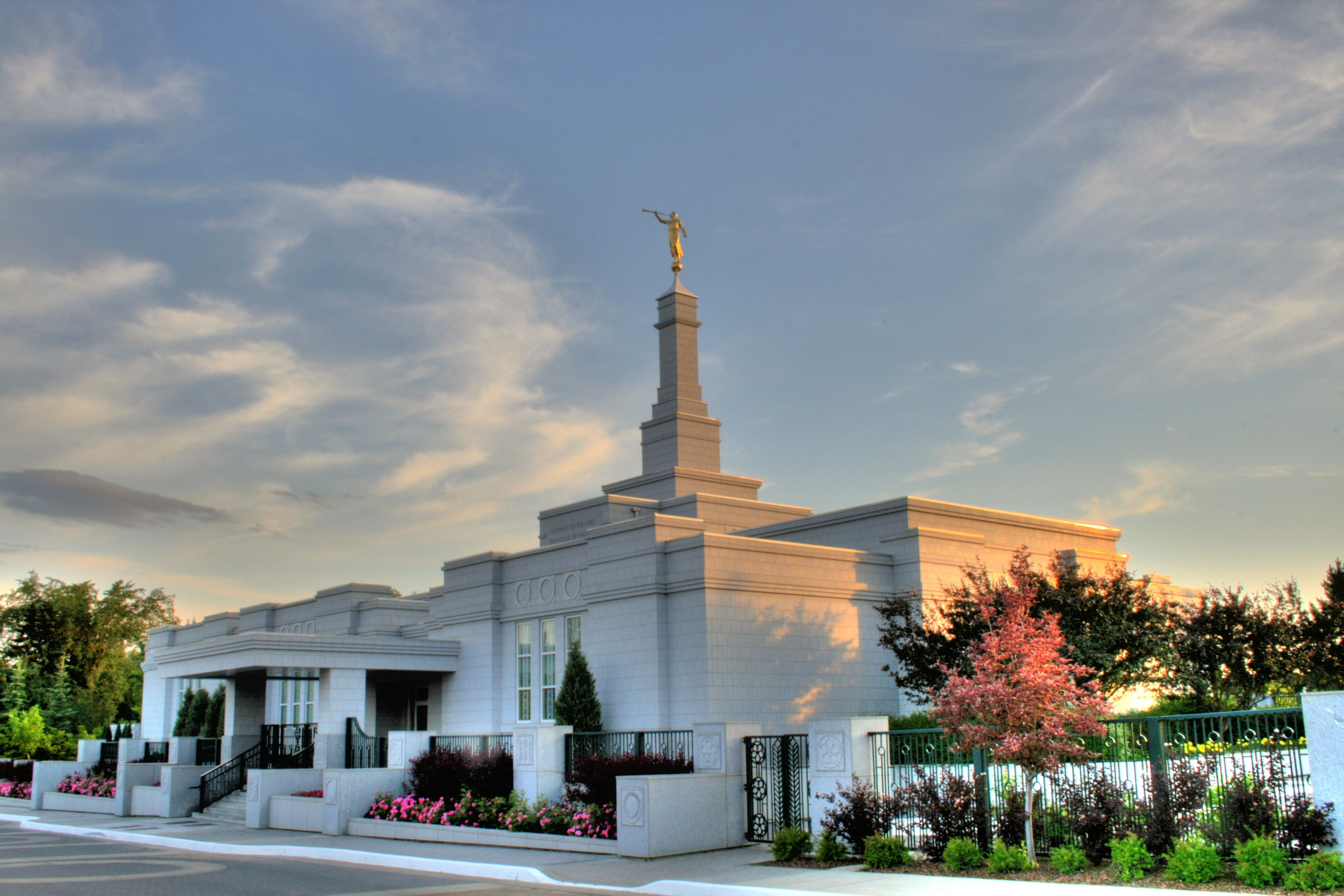
- The Edmonton Alberta Temple
- Interactive map of Edmonton Alberta Temple
- Number: 67
- Dedication: 11 December 1999, by Gordon B. Hinckley
- Site: 1 acre (0.40 ha)
- Floor area: 10,700 ft^{2} (990 m^{2})
- Height: 71 ft (22 m)
- Official website • News & images

Church chronology
← Billings Montana Temple	Edmonton Alberta Temple	→ Raleigh North Carolina Temple

Additional information
- Announced: 11 August 1998, by Gordon B. Hinckley
- Groundbreaking: 27 February 1999, by Yoshihiko Kikuchi
- Open house: 3–7 December 1999
- Current president: David Clarence McCue
- Designed by: Robert Bennett and Church A&E Services
- Location: Edmonton, Alberta, Canada
- Coordinates: 53°29′22.53479″N 113°34′13.93679″W
- Exterior finish: Light gray granite veneer quarried in Quebec
- Design: Classic modern, single-spire design
- Baptistries: 1
- Ordinance rooms: 2 (two-stage progressive)
- Sealing rooms: 2

The Edmonton Alberta Temple is the 67th operating temple of the Church of Jesus Christ of Latter-day Saints and the second in the province of Alberta, following the one in Cardston. Located in Edmonton, the temple serves about 15,700 members in the area. The intent to construct the temple was announced on August 11, 1998, by church president Gordon B. Hinckley. It was dedicated on December 11 and 12, 1999 and was the first in Alberta in a major metropolitan area. The temple serves seven stakes across central and northern Alberta.

Designed by Robert Bennett, the building uses a classic modern architectural style, with a single spire that has a statue of the angel Moroni on top, and light gray granite quarried in Quebec on the exterior. The interior include symbolic elements such as wheat and the wild rose—honoring Alberta’s agricultural roots and provincial flower.

== History ==
The Edmonton Alberta Temple was announced on August 11, 1998, following church president Gordon B. Hinckley’s nine-day trip across Canada, during which he visited Alberta. At the time of announcement, members had to drive 6 hours to the nearest temple. Groundbreaking ceremonies were held on February 27, 1999, presided over by Yoshihiko Kikuchi of the Seventy and second counselor in presidency of the church's North America Central Area (LDS Church).

After construction was completed, a public open house was held from December 3 to 7, 1999 (closed on Sunday), with approximately 27,210 visitors touring the temple. The temple was dedicated in seven sessions on December 11 and 12, 1999, by Hinckley. About 6,900 church members attended the dedicatory sessions.

Since its dedication, church members have considered the temple as a symbol of permanence and stability in Edmonton and northern Alberta, and its presence has influenced some members—particularly retirees—to remain in the area to continue participating in temple worship.

At the time of its dedication, the temple covered six stakes. Once construction was completed, the temple became the church's 67th temple, and the first Canadian Province to have two temples. A third temple in Alberta was announced on February 18, 2025 and will be located in Lethbridge.

In 2020, like all the church's others, the Edmonton Alberta Temple was closed for a time in response to the COVID-19 pandemic.

== Design and architecture ==
The Edmonton Alberta Temple uses a classic modern architectural style, designed by Robert Bennett of Bennett Architect, Inc., in collaboration with the church’s architecture and engineering services group. The temple is located on a 1-acre plot at 14335 53rd Avenue NW in Edmonton, Alberta.

The structure's exterior has light gray granite that was quarried in Quebec, along with a single spire with an 80 foot statue of the angel Moroni, a central figure in the Book of Mormon, on its top. which is meant to be visible from the nearby freeway.

The temple includes two ordinance rooms, two sealing rooms, and one baptistry.

The design has symbolic elements including motifs of wheat, representing Alberta’s agricultural heritage, and the wild rose. These motifs are found in various decorative features throughout the temple, including art glass, doorknobs, and furniture.

== Temple presidents ==
The church's temples are directed by a temple president and matron, each typically serving for a term of three years. The president and matron oversee the administration of temple operations and provide guidance and training for both temple patrons and staff.

Serving from 1999 to 2004, Donald D. Salmon was the first president, with Gertrude J. Salmon serving as matron. As of 2023, Ronald J. Peterson is the president, with Sherry L. Peterson serving as matron.

== Admittance ==
After construction was completed, a public open house was held from December 3 to 7, 1999 (excluding Sunday), with approximately 27,210 visitors touring the temple. The temple was dedicated by Gordon B. Hinckley on December 11 and 12, 1999, in seven sessions. Like all the church's temples, it is not used for Sunday worship services. To members of the church, temples are regarded as sacred houses of the Lord. Once dedicated, only church members with a current temple recommend can enter for worship.

== See also ==
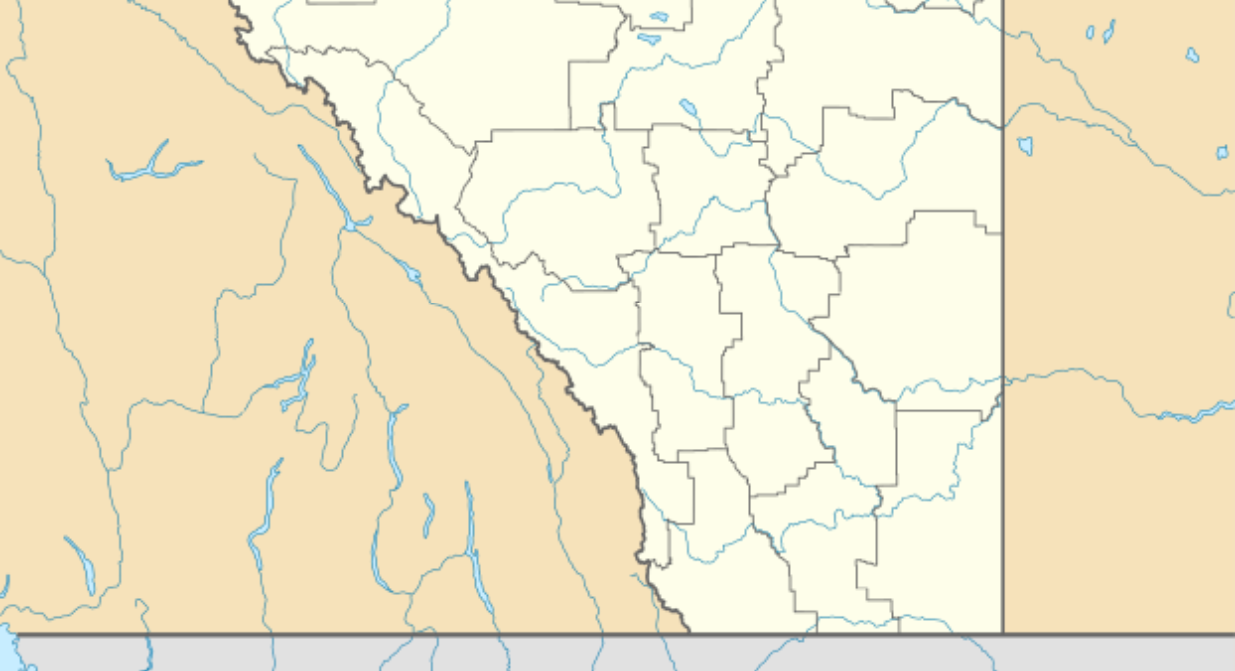

Temples in Alberta

Canada Temples
Temples in Canada

= Operating
= Under construction
= Announced
= Temporarily Closed

- Comparison of temples of The Church of Jesus Christ of Latter-day Saints
- List of temples of The Church of Jesus Christ of Latter-day Saints
- List of temples of The Church of Jesus Christ of Latter-day Saints by geographic region
- Temple architecture (Latter-day Saints)
- The Church of Jesus Christ of Latter-day Saints in Canada

== Additional reading ==
- Kruckenberg, Janet (February 20, 1999), "The announcements of new holy edifices bring joy and tears", Church News
- Lloyd, R. Scott (March 6, 1999), "Ground is broken for temple in Canada, 'a monument of faith'", Church News
- "Golden statues of angel set atop temples in Edmonton, Raleigh", Church News, September 11, 1999, archived from the original on June 19, 2019
- Weaver, Sarah Jane (December 18, 1999), "Open house visitor: 'What does this mean to me?'", Church News
- Weaver, Sarah Jane (December 18, 1999), "Temple dedicated in 'hub of the north'", Church News
- Weaver, Sarah Jane (February 19, 2000), "Edmonton: LDS contribute to growth in Canada's northern hub", Church News
- Hill, Greg (February 28, 2009), "Another temple for Alberta", Church News
