= Vancouver British Columbia Temple =

Latter-day Saint temple in British Columbia, Canada

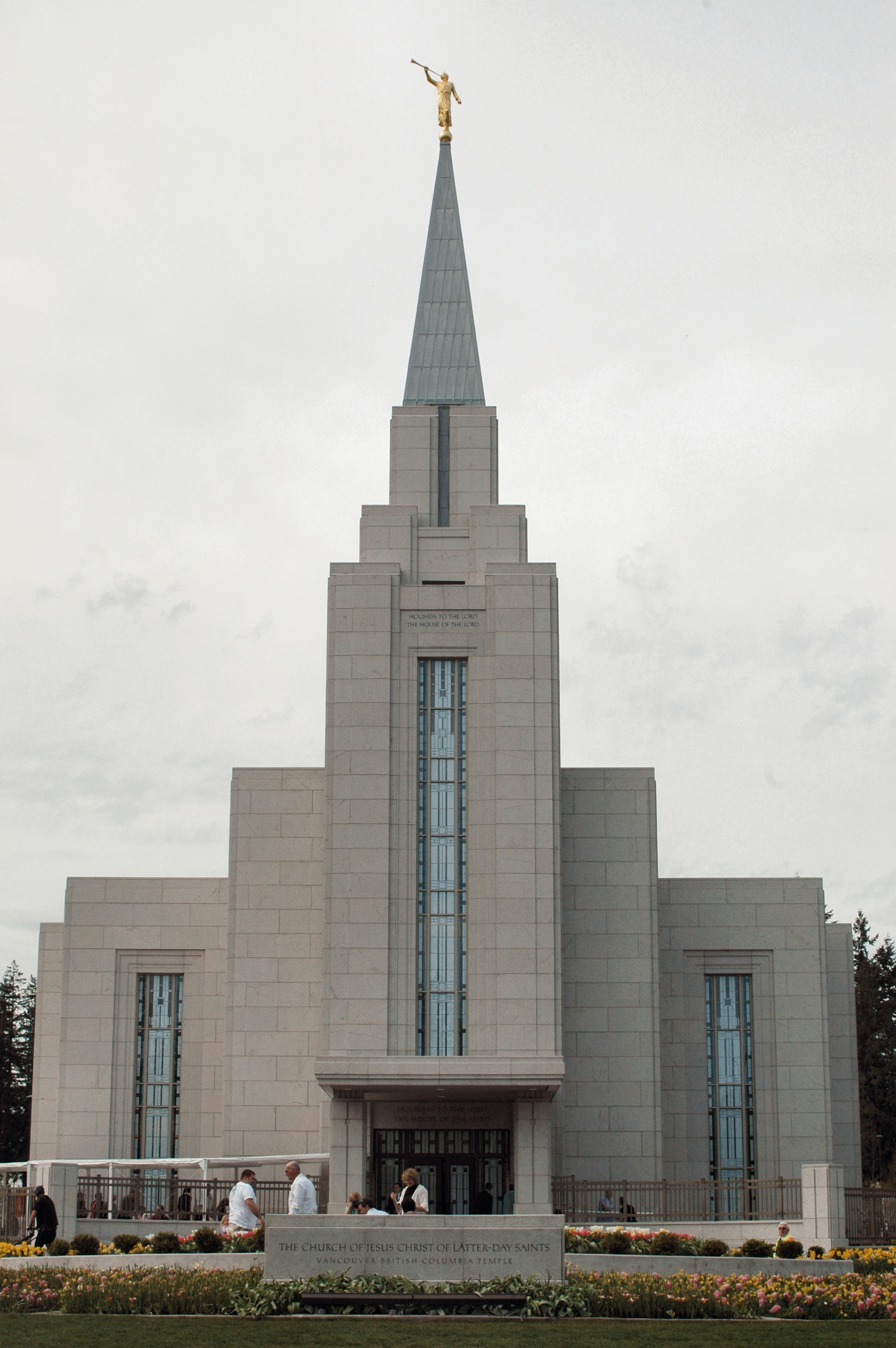
- Interactive map of Vancouver British Columbia Temple
- Number: 131
- Dedication: 2 May 2010, by Thomas S. Monson
- Site: 11.6 acres (4.7 ha)
- Floor area: 28,165 ft^{2} (2,616.6 m^{2})
- Height: 140 ft (43 m)
- Official website • News & images

Church chronology
← Oquirrh Mountain Utah Temple	Vancouver British Columbia Temple	→ Gila Valley Arizona Temple

Additional information
- Announced: 25 May 2006, by Gordon B. Hinckley
- Groundbreaking: 4 August 2007, by Ronald A. Rasband
- Open house: 2–4 April 2010
- Current president: Brian D. Leavitt
- Designed by: Abbarch Architecture and GSBS
- Location: Langley, British Columbia, Canada
- Coordinates: 49°9′2.433599″N 122°39′33.21000″W
- Exterior finish: Branco Siena granite from Brazil
- Baptistries: 1
- Ordinance rooms: 2 (two-stage progressive)
- Sealing rooms: 2
- Notes: Open house was held in April and the dedication 2 May 2010. First temple in British Columbia and 6th in Canada.

The Vancouver British Columbia Temple is a temple of the Church of Jesus Christ of Latter-day Saints. The intent to build the temple was announced on May 25, 2006, by the First Presidency in letters to local church leadership. It is the seventh in Canada and the first in British Columbia.

The temple has a single attached end spire with a statue of the angel Moroni. This temple was designed by the architectural firms Abbarch Architecture and GSBS in Salt Lake City, Utah. A groundbreaking ceremony, to signify the beginning of construction, was held on August 4, 2007, conducted by Ronald A. Rasband, of the Presidency of the Seventy.

== History ==
Announced on May 25, 2006, the temple is located on a 10-acre (40,000 m^{2}) site at 200 Street and 82 Avenue in the suburb of Langley. To signify the beginning of construction, Ronald A. Rasband presided at a groundbreaking ceremony on August 4, 2007. After construction was completed, a public open house was held April 9 to 24, 2010, prior to its dedication on May 2, 2010, by church president Thomas S. Monson. Following dedication, only church members with a temple recommend are permitted to enter the temple.

In 2020, like all the church's other temples, the Vancouver British Columbia Temple was closed for a time due to the COVID-19 pandemic.

== Design and architecture ==
Designed by Abbarch Architecture and GSBS, its architecture reflects both the cultural heritage of British Columbia and its spiritual significance to the church.

The temple is on an 11.6-acre plot, with surrounding landscaping or trees and flowers. These elements are designed to provide a tranquil setting that enhances the sacred atmosphere of the site.

The structure stands 140 feet tall, and is constructed with Branco Siena granite from Brazil. The exterior has a gilded statue of the angel Moroni.

The interior has a flower motif which uses British Columbia's provincial flower, the Pacific dogwood, in a color scheme of green, light blue, and gold. The temple includes two instruction rooms, two sealing rooms, and a baptistry, each designed for ceremonial use.

The design uses symbolic elements representing British Columbia, to provide deeper spiritual meaning to the temple's appearance and function. Symbolism is important to church members and include the use of British Columbia's provincial flower, the Pacific dogwood, in decorative elements throughout the temple. Another example of symbolism is the color palette; the green, light blue, and gold represent “the natural colors in the sea, sky, and evergreens of the Pacific Northwest.”

== Temple presidents ==
The church's temples are directed by a temple president and matron, each serving for a term of three years. The president and matron oversee the administration of temple operations and provide guidance and training for both temple patrons and staff.

Serving from 2010 to 2012, the first president of the Vancouver British Columbia Temple was Cordell Rolfson, with Marilyn J. Rolfson serving as matron. As of 2024, the president is Brian D. Leavitt, with Brenda E. Leavitt as matron.

== Admittance ==
On December 5, 2009, the church announced the public open that was held from April 9 to April 24, 2010 (excluding Sundays). The temple was dedicated by Thomas S. Monson on May 2, 2010, in three sessions.

Like all the church's temples, it is not used for Sunday worship services. To members of the church, temples are regarded as sacred houses of the Lord. Once dedicated, only church members with a current temple recommend can enter for worship.

== See also ==

Temples in Canada

Alberta Temples
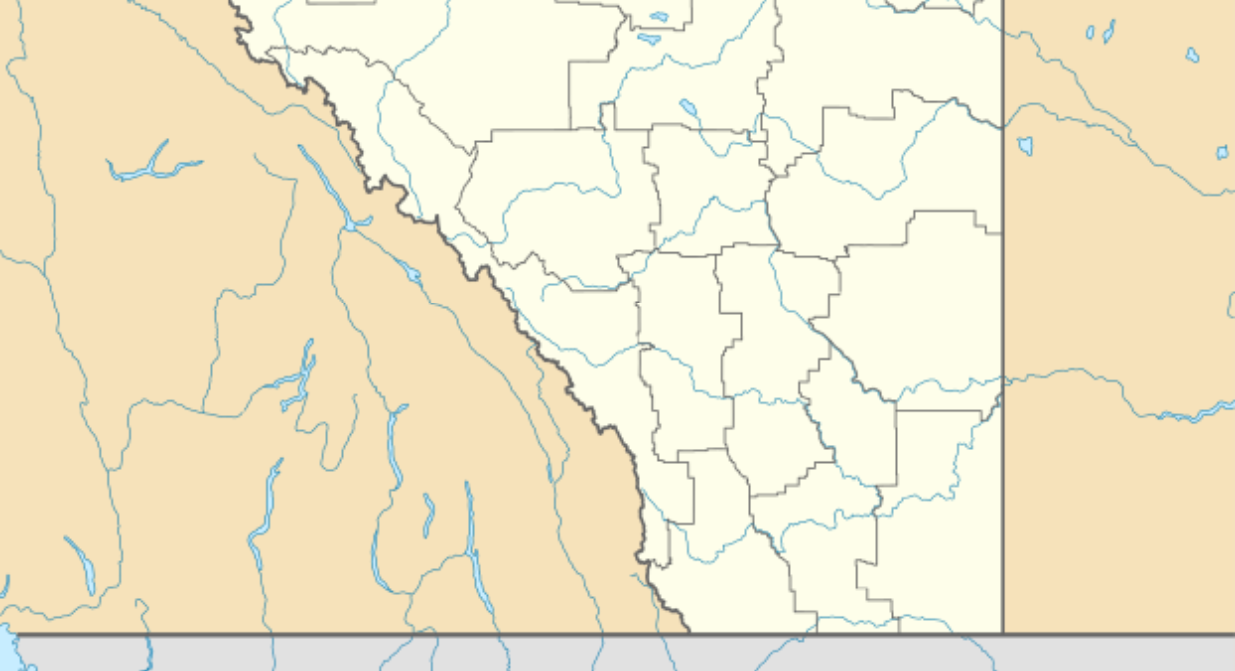
Temples in Alberta

= Operating
= Under construction
= Announced
= Temporarily Closed

- Comparison of temples of The Church of Jesus Christ of Latter-day Saints
- List of temples of The Church of Jesus Christ of Latter-day Saints
- List of temples of The Church of Jesus Christ of Latter-day Saints by geographic region
- Temple architecture (Latter-day Saints)
- The Church of Jesus Christ of Latter-day Saints in Canada

== Additional reading ==
- Irwin, Al (2006-08-09). "Place of peace". Langley Times. Archived from the original on September 28, 2007.
- Bucholtz, Frank (2006-08-11). "Welcome addition". Langley Times. Archived from the original on September 28, 2007.
- "New Temple Will Be Built in Vancouver". Newsroom (Press release). LDS Church. June 10, 2006.
- Moneo, Shannon (May 24, 2010), "Mormon temple project in British Columbia an exacting job", Journal of Commerce, Reed Construction Data, Reed Business Information, Reed Elsevier, archived from the original on May 8, 2013
