= Toronto Ontario Temple =

Latter-day Saints temple in Canada

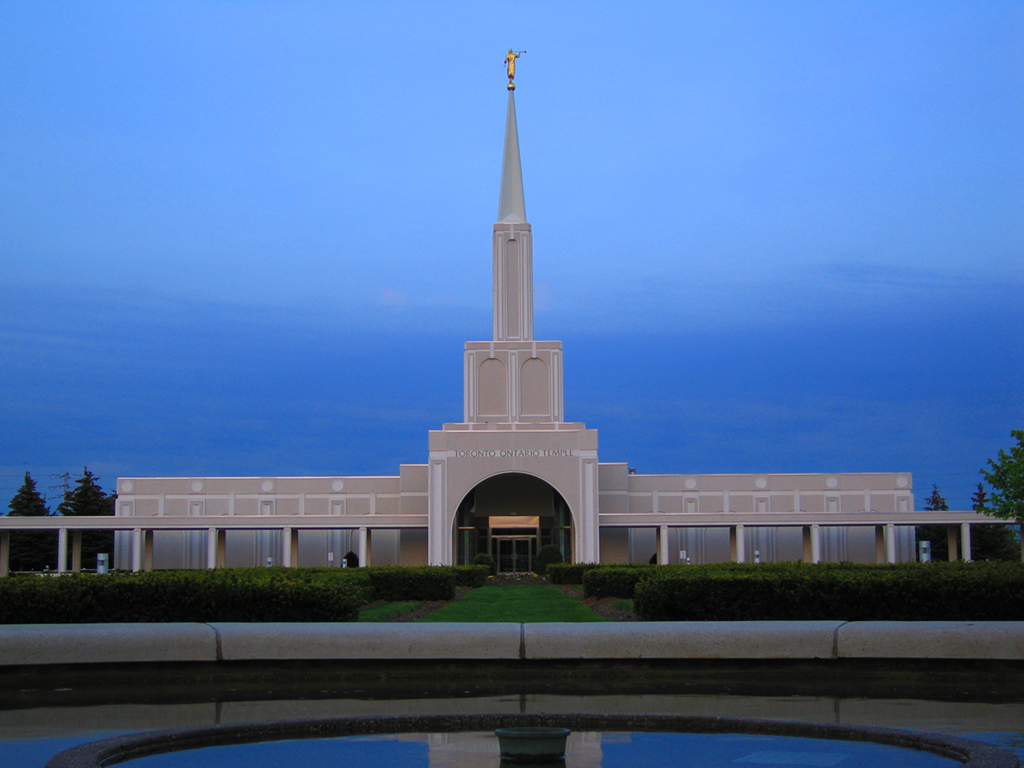
- Interactive map of Toronto Ontario Temple
- Number: 44
- Dedication: 25 August 1990, by Gordon B. Hinckley
- Site: 13.4 acres (5.4 ha)
- Floor area: 55,558 ft^{2} (5,161.5 m^{2})
- Height: 171 ft (52 m)
- Official website • News & images

Church chronology
← Las Vegas Nevada Temple	Toronto Ontario Temple	→ San Diego California Temple

Additional information
- Announced: 7 April 1984, by Spencer W. Kimball
- Groundbreaking: 10 October 1987, by Thomas S. Monson
- Open house: 2–18 August 1990; 13 February–8 March 2025
- Rededicated: 23 March 2025, by Jeffrey R. Holland
- Current president: Bradley Albert Thompson
- Designed by: Allward-Gouinlock Inc.
- Location: Brampton, Ontario, Canada
- Coordinates: 43°44′39.61679″N 79°44′45.81240″W
- Exterior finish: White cast stone
- Design: Modern, single-spire design
- Baptistries: 1
- Ordinance rooms: 4 (stationary)
- Sealing rooms: 6
- Clothing rental: Yes

The Toronto Ontario Temple is the 44th operating temple of the Church of Jesus Christ of Latter-day Saints (LDS Church). The intent to build the temple was announced to local leaders on the morning of 7 April 1984, and then referenced by Gordon B. Hinckley, second counselor in the First Presidency, during the general conference session which followed. It was the second temple built in Canada (after the Cardston Alberta Temple), becoming the first country in the world, outside the United States, to have two temples in its borders.

The temple is located on 5.26 hectares (13.0 acres) in Brampton, which is 32 kilometres (20 mi) west of Downtown Toronto. A groundbreaking ceremony, to signify beginning of construction, was held on 10 October 1987, with Thomas S. Monson presiding.

== History ==
The intent to build the temple was announced on 7 April 1984. On 22 June 1986, Thomas S. Monson, then a counselor in the First Presidency, created the LDS Church's 1,600th stake in Kitchener, Ontario, and again commented that a temple would be built in the Toronto area. Monson returned for the groundbreaking ceremony on 10 October 1987. The temple was dedicated by Gordon B. Hinckley on 25 August 1990. The temple's interior totals 57,982 square feet (5,386.7 m^{2}), four ordinance rooms and six sealing rooms.

Two LDS Church presidents hold ties to Toronto. John Taylor and his wife immigrated to Toronto in 1832, while Monson served as president of the church's Canadian Mission, headquartered in Toronto, from 1959 to 1962.

In 2020, like all others in the church, the Toronto Ontario Temple was closed for a time due to the COVID-19 pandemic.

On 1 May 2023, the First Presidency announced that the Toronto Ontario Temple would close for renovations. The temple closed on 23 October 2023, and was projected to reopen in December 2024.

== Design and architecture ==
The building's design was inspired by the Denver Colorado Temple. On 4 October 1990, the Toronto Ontario Temple was given an award of excellence from the Development Design Awards program. The temple's architecture reflects both the cultural heritage of the Ontario region and the spiritual significance to the church.

The temple sits on a 13.4-acre plot in Brampton, which is a suburb of Toronto. The building is located on the intersection of Bramalea Road and Bovaird Drive, facing east.

The structure stands 171 feet tall, with an area of 57,982 square feet, constructed with white cast stone. The exterior has "a three-tiered tower that sits on a square base and has a spire that leads up to a point," an element chosen for its symbolic significance and alignment with temple traditions. The design uses elements that reflect both the local culture and broader symbolism to the church.

The temple includes four ordinance rooms, six sealing rooms, a baptistry, and a celestial room, each arranged for ceremonial use.

The design has elements using Latter-day Saint and Biblical symbolism, providing deeper spiritual meaning to the temple's appearance and function. Symbolism is important to church members, and symbols include the angel Moroni statue that tops the building, representing "the restoration of the gospel of Jesus Christ." Another example is the temple's eastward orientation, which reflects the ancient Israelite tradition of building east-facing temples and symbolizes "watching for the second coming of Christ, which has been likened to the dawning of a new day."

== Renovations ==
On 1 May 2023, the First Presidency announced that the temple would undergo renovations. The temple closed on 23 October 2023, and was originally expected to reopen in December 2024. With renovations nearing completion, on 28 October 2024 the church announced that following media and invited guest tours earlier in the week, a public open house would begin on 13 February 2025 and run through 8 March 2025 (excluding Saturdays). The temple is then scheduled to be dedicated on 23 March 2025 by Jeffrey R. Holland.

== Temple presidents ==
The church's temples are directed by a temple president and matron, each serving for a term of three years. The president and matron oversee the administration of temple operations and provide guidance and training for both temple patrons and staff.

The first president of the Toronto Ontario Temple was Arnold N. Roberts, with the matron being Audrey C. Roberts. They served from 1990 to 1993. As of 2024, Tyrone Wong is the president, with Sui Y. Wong serving as matron.

== Admittance ==
Following the completion of the temple, the church announced that a public open house would be held from 2–18 August 1990 (excluding Sundays). The temple was dedicated in 11 sessions by Gordon B. Hinckley from 25–27 August 1990. Like all the church's temples, it is not used for Sunday worship services. To members of the church, temples are regarded as sacred houses of the Lord. Once dedicated, only church members with a current temple recommend can enter for worship.

== See also ==

Temples in Canada

Alberta Temples
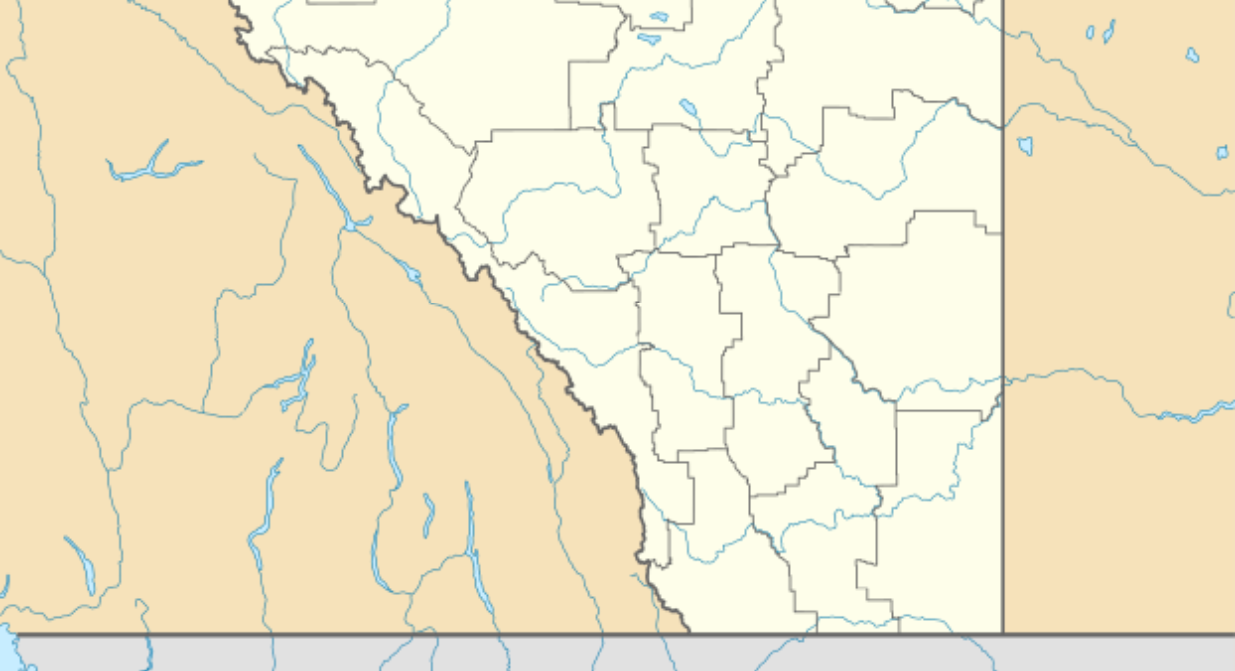
Temples in Alberta

= Operating
= Under construction
= Announced
= Temporarily Closed

- Comparison of temples of The Church of Jesus Christ of Latter-day Saints
- List of temples of The Church of Jesus Christ of Latter-day Saints
- List of temples of The Church of Jesus Christ of Latter-day Saints by geographic region
- Temple architecture (Latter-day Saints)
- The Church of Jesus Christ of Latter-day Saints in Canada
