= Canada membership statistics (LDS Church) =

Membership in Canada
Year	Membership
1920	9,411
1930	11,633
1940	13,666
1950	18,755
1960	31,645
1970	55,455
1979	82,769
1989*	125,000
1999	156,575
2009	177,600
2019	199,054
2021	199,534
2023	203,339
*Membership was published as an estimate. Source: Wendall J. Ashton; Jim M. Wall, Deseret News, various years, Church Almanac Country Information: Venezuela

In the 2021 Canadian census the number of persons who self-identified with The Church of Jesus Christ of Latter-day Saints was 85,315 down from 105,365 in 2011. The following tables and graphs use general population data taken from Statistics Canada using the first quarter 2020 population estimates. The official membership statistics as of Jan 1, 2020 provided by the Church of Jesus Christ of Latter-day Saints (LDS Church) was used for all other data.

Membership of the LDS Church 0-24,999 25,000-49,999 50,000-99,999

Percent of citizen adherence to the LDS Church 0.0-0.5% 0.5-1.0% 1.0-1.5% 1.5-3.0%

== Table ==
Province	Membership	Population	% LDS	Stakes	Districts	Wards	Branches	Total Congregations	Missions	Temples
Alberta	85,916	5,048,151	1.70%	27		201	38	239	2	3
British Columbia	31,885	5,658,528	0.56%	8		49	24	73	1	1
Manitoba	5,252	1,505,117	0.35%	2		8	8	16	1	1
New Brunswick	2,684	867,383	0.31%	1		5	2	7		
Newfoundland	830	548,557	0.15%		1		2	2		
Northwest Territories & Nunavut	163	87,749	0.19%				1	1		
Nova Scotia	5,159	1,090,074	0.48%	1		6	7	13		1
Ontario	57,969	16,136,480	0.36%	9	1	59	35	94	1	1
Prince Edward Island	568	182,001	0.31%			1	2	3		
Quebec	14,949	9,033,887	0.17%	3	1	19	17	36	1	1
Saskatchewan	5,925	1,265,936	0.47%	2		8	9	17		1
Yukon	264	48,218	0.55%				1	1		
TOTAL	211,581	41,472,081	0.51%	53	3	356	146	502	6	9

== See also ==
- The Church of Jesus Christ of Latter-day Saints in Canada
- LDS membership statistics (World)
- LDS membership statistics (United States)
