= Edward J. Wood =

Canadian LDS Church leader (1866–1956)

Edward James Wood (October 27, 1866 – April 24, 1956) was a prominent local leader of the Church of Jesus Christ of Latter-day Saints (LDS Church) in Alberta, Canada and was the founder of Glenwood, and Hill Spring, Alberta.

Wood was born to Mormon parents in Salt Lake City, Utah Territory. At age 21, he was sent to Samoa as a missionary for the LDS Church, where he served from 1888 to 1892. In 1891, he reportedly raised his missionary companion Brigham Smoot from the dead after Smoot had drowned in the ocean. Upon returning to Utah in 1892, Wood married Mary Ann Solomon. In 1896, Wood was again sent to Samoa, this time to be the president of the Samoan Mission of the church.

After Wood returned to Utah in 1898, Charles O. Card invited him to move to Canada in order to take over management of the management of Card's mercantile store in the Latter-day Saint settlement of Cardston, in the Canadian North West Territories. Wood accepted and moved to Cardston with his family in September 1901. In 1903, Wood married his wife's sister Addie who had been engaged to his brother before the brother died. She lived in Salt Lake City. Wood visited her when he went to general conference, and had two children by her, but he does not include her name in his accounts of his trips.

In 1903, Wood became the president of the Alberta Stake of the LDS Church, which was headquartered in Cardston. In 1906, Wood organized the church's purchase of the 66,500-acre (269 km^{2}) Cochran Ranch for $6 an acre. On this land, Wood founded the Latter-day Saint settlements of Glenwood (1908) and Hill Spring (1910).

In 1923, Wood became the first president of the LDS Church's Cardston Alberta Temple. He simultaneously served as temple president and stake president until 1942, when he was released from his duties as stake president. In 1948, Wood asked to be released as temple president due to ill health. Shortly thereafter, he was ordained the patriarch of the Alberta Stake, a position he held until his death at age 89. At his death, the president of the LDS Church, David O. McKay, said to apostle Hugh B. Brown, "We have never had a greater President of a Stake than Edward J. Wood."

Wood was the father of eight children. In 1958, a school named in his honour was built in Cardston; it was demolished in 2004.

== See also ==
- The Church of Jesus Christ of Latter-day Saints in Canada
