= Donald L. Hallstrom =

American LDS leader

Emeritus general authority
- October 5, 2019
- Called by: Russell M. Nelson

First Quorum of the Seventy
- April 1, 2000 – October 5, 2019
- Called by: Gordon B. Hinckley
- End reason: Honorably released; granted emeritus status

Presidency of the Seventy
- April 4, 2009 – August 1, 2017
- Called by: Thomas S. Monson
- End reason: Honorably released

Personal details
- Born: Donald Larry Hallstrom; July 27, 1949 (age 75); Honolulu, Territory of Hawaii
- Spouse(s): Diane Clifton
- Children: 4

Donald Larry Hallstrom (born July 27, 1949) has been a general authority of the Church of Jesus Christ of Latter-day Saints (LDS Church) since 2000. From 2009 to 2017, he served as a member of the Presidency of the Seventy.

Hallstrom was born to James Emerson Hallstrom and Betty Jo (née Lambert) in and grew up in Honolulu. As a young man he enjoyed several sports, including basketball and surfing. He served as a missionary of the LDS Church in the England Central Mission from 1969 to 1971. After his mission, he received a bachelor's degree in economics from Brigham Young University. Hallstrom owned and operated a Honolulu real estate appraisal company, the Hallstrom Group.

Hallstrom served on various boards, including the executive board of the Aloha Council of the Boy Scouts of America, the National Advisory Council of the Boy Scouts of America, and the President's Roundtable of Brigham Young University–Hawaii. He was also vice chairman of Hawaii Reserves, which manages the LDS Church's non-ecclesiastical real estate in Hawaii.

== LDS Church service ==
In the LDS Church, Hallstrom served as bishop of the Makiki Ward in Honolulu from 1980 to 1985 and as president of the Honolulu Hawaii Stake from 1985 to 1990. He then served as a regional representative from 1990 to 1995 and as an area seventy from 1995 to 2000. As a regional representative in Hawaii, Hallstrom alerted church leadership in Utah of the possibility that same-sex marriage could soon be legalized in the state and was a leader in the church's coalition to oppose legalization.

Hallstrom was called as a general authority and member of the First Quorum of the Seventy in 2000. Among other assignments, he has served in several area presidencies, including as a counselor in the church's North America Central Area, then as both a counselor and as president of the Asia Area. In 2004, Hallstrom was executive director of the church's Audiovisual Department. In 2008, Hallstrom participated in a major donation of wheelchairs through Latter-day Saint Charities to His Majesty the King Bhumibol Adulyadej in honor of the 80th birthday of the Thai monarch.

Hallstrom became a member of the Presidency of the Seventy in April 2009, filling a vacancy created by the call of Neil L. Andersen to the Quourm of the Twelve Apostles. In this capacity, he has had responsibility for the work of the church in the North America Northeast, North America Northwest, and North America West areas. He was released from the Presidency of the Seventy on August 1, 2017. At that time in 2017, he began service as Executive Director of the church's Priesthood and Family Department (PFD). During part of his time in the Presidency of the Seventy, Hallstrom served on the governing board of the Church Educational System (CES). Following his release from the Presidency of the Seventy, he then served as an ex officio member, due to his role in PFD.

He was designated as an emeritus general authority in October 2019.

== Personal life ==
Hallstrom married Diane Clifton on July 22, 1972, in the Cardston Alberta Temple. Clifton was a native of Taber, Alberta, Canada and they are the parents of four children.
