= Cardston Alberta Temple =

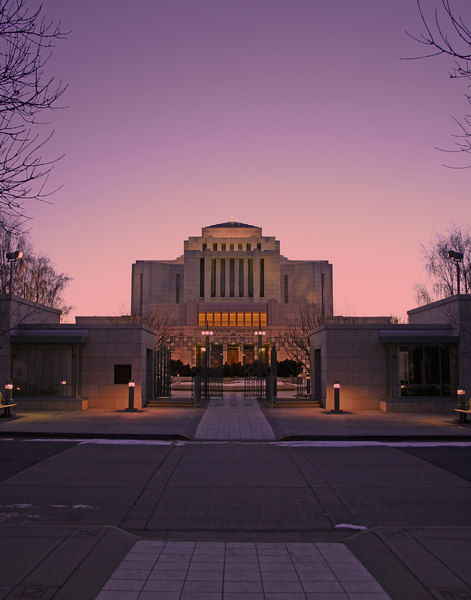
- Interactive map of Cardston Alberta Temple
- Number: 6
- Dedication: 26 August 1923, by Heber J. Grant
- Site: 10 acres (4.0 ha)
- Floor area: 88,562 ft^{2} (8,227.7 m^{2})
- Height: 85 ft (26 m)
- Official website • News & images

Church chronology
← Laie Hawaii Temple	Cardston Alberta Temple	→ Mesa Arizona Temple

Additional information
- Announced: 27 June 1913, by Joseph F. Smith
- Groundbreaking: 9 November 1913, by Daniel Kent Greene
- Open house: Tours offered, 1920–23; 6–15 June 1991 (after renovation)
- Rededicated: 2 July 1962, by Hugh B. Brown; 22 June 1991, by Gordon B. Hinckley
- Current president: John D. Bridge
- Designed by: Hyrum Pope and Harold W. Burton
- Location: Cardston, Alberta, Canada
- Coordinates: 49°11′52.23840″N 113°18′32.50800″W
- Exterior finish: White granite
- Baptistries: 1
- Ordinance rooms: 4 (four-stage progressive)
- Sealing rooms: 5
- Clothing rental: Yes
- Visitors' center: Yes
- Notes: An addition was completed in 1962 and was dedicated on July 2, 1962 by Hugh B. Brown.

Cardston Alberta Temple
- Interactive map of Cardston Alberta Temple
- Location: Cardston, Southern Alberta, Alberta, Canada

History
- Founded: June 27, 1913
- Built: 1913–1923

Site notes
- Area: 10 acres (40,000 m^{2})
- Architectural style: LDS temple
- Governing body: The Church of Jesus Christ of Latter-day Saints
- Website: Official LDS Cardston Alberta Temple page

National Historic Site of Canada
- Designated: 1992

The Cardston Alberta Temple (formerly the Alberta Temple) is a temple of the Church of Jesus Christ of Latter-day Saints in Cardston, Alberta. It was the eighth temple, the sixth still in operation, and is the church's oldest outside the United States. The intent to build the temple was announced on October 12, 1912, by church president Joseph F. Smith, during general conference. It was both the first temple built in Canada and outside the United States. As of 2026, the church has four temples in Alberta and ten in Canada. It is one of two temples that uses the shape of a cross in its design (the other being the Laie Hawaii Temple).

== History ==
The intent to construct the temple was announced by church president Joseph F. Smith on October 12, 1912. It was built on an eight-acre site named Tabernacle Block, which was given to the church by Charles Ora Card.

In 1887, Card and other church members came to the area as refugees and established a settlement at Lee Creek, Alberta, now Cardston. A tabernacle was built to support the church's membership growth. Cardston was chosen for the site to construct a temple in Canada. Since the church already owned the land where the tabernacle stood, the decision was made to dismantle it and build the temple in its place. A groundbreaking ceremony, to signify the beginning of construction, took place on November 9, 1913, with Smith presiding and attended by local church members and community leaders.

Challenges occurred during its construction, including delays due to World War I. The construction took 10 years, with the final two years focused on interior furnishings and preparation for public use.

As construction began, the Relief Society General Board started a penny subscription. They saved a penny each week, which provided more than $13,000 to the construction of the Cardston Alberta and Laie Hawaii temples.

The temple was dedicated on August 26-29, 1923, by church president Heber J. Grant, with 11 sessions held. The site expanded to more than 10 acres (4.0 ha) in the mid-1950s. An addition was dedicated on July 2, 1962, by Hugh B. Brown. The first temple president was Edward J. Wood, who served from 1923 to 1948. The temple was renovated in the 1990s, with Gordon B. Hinckley rededicating it on June 22, 1991.

In 1992, the temple was designated a National Historic Site by Parks Canada. A plaque at the temple shows this designation. The temple is also on the Church Historic Landmark list.

The temple received the “Cardston Beautiful Annual Beautification Award” in 2010, a local award for making the city more beautiful. Stan Johnson, a previous mayor of Cardston (and as of 2010, a counselor in the temple presidency), said the award was “a tremendous contribution that (was) made to the overall beautification of our community by the temple.”

In 2020, like all the church's others, the temple was closed for a time in response to the COVID-19 pandemic. It is the church's oldest Latter-temple built outside the United States, and the sixth oldest still in operation.

== Design and architecture ==
The temple's architectural style uses a combination of "Grecian massiveness" and "a Peruvian touch", resembling designs of Aztec temples, with the intent to be a similar style of permanence, solidity, and dignity of all temples that came before it. The temple was designed by Harold W. Burton and Hyrum Pope, inspired by the designs of American architect Frank Lloyd Wright. It combines Mayan-Aztec and Prairie School architectural styles. At the time, the temple was unique, due to it not needing a large assembly hall. The Deseret Evening News said that the inside design had similarities with contemporary temples, but that the outside was unique and “totally unlike any of them.” The design of the temple was a radical shift in design, in an Octagon shape of a cross, with a three meter high retaining wall.

The temple has four ordinance rooms, five sealing rooms, and a floor area of 88,562 square feet (8,227.7 m2). Set on 10 acres of land, it is constructed with white granite from a quarry near Kootenay Lake in Nelson, British Columbia, and marble from the Marblehead quarry at the south end of Duncan Lake. The exterior has a singular central tower with a pyramid roof, hand-shaped stone, and stained-glass windows, while the interior has woods and materials imported from all over the world, hand-painted murals, and a water feature.

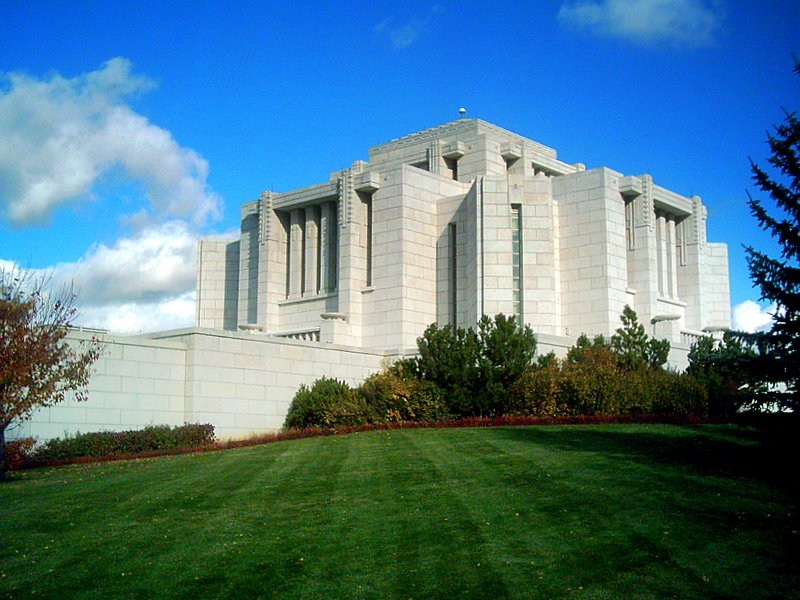
Cardston Alberta Temple during the day

The temple is on top of a small hill at the town’s central square, enclosed within a stone wall and views of Chief Mountain. Its design uses an octagon shape, under a pyramidal capped roof, and Greek cross layout with arms facing cardinal directions. The surrounding landscaping has large trees, flower gardens, and paved walkways.

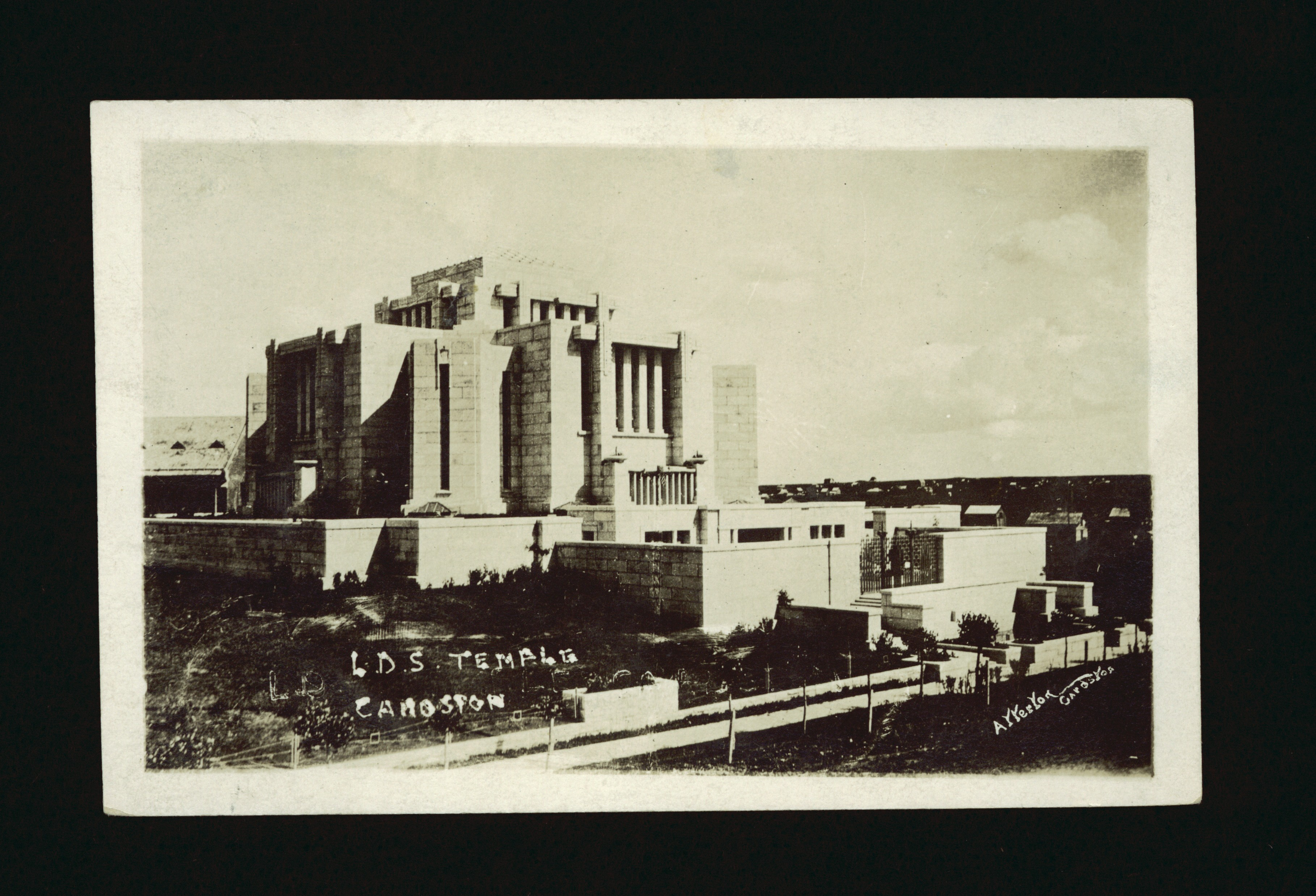
A view of the Cardston Temple, circa the 1920s.

=== Renovations ===
The temple has undergone two major renovations to preserve structural integrity and update its facilities. The most significant renovation project began in 1988. This included updates to the electrical and mechanical systems, adding an entryway to the front of the building, and renovating the interior. The interior was refurbished while preserving the original design. The renovated temple was rededicated on June 22, 1991, by Gordon B. Hinckley.

== Temple leadership ==
The church's temples are directed by a temple president and matron, each typically serving for a term of three years, except the first president, Edward J. Wood, who served from 1923 to 1948. The president and matron oversee the administration of temple operations and provide guidance and training for both temple patrons and staff. As of 2025, John D. Bridge is the president, with Bonnie H. Bridge serving as matron. Other notable temple presidents and matrons include Merlin R. Lybbert (1994–97); Elaine L. Jack (1997–2000); and Ardeth G. Kapp (2000–03).

=== Admittance and use ===
Before its dedication, the temple was open to the public during an open house. The temple was dedicated in 11 sessions by church president Heber J. Grant, August 26-29, 1923. An addition was dedicated on July 2, 1962, by Hugh B. Brown, and following renovations, it was rededicated on June 22, 1991, by Gordon B. Hinckley.

Like all the church's temples, it is not used for Sunday worship services. To members of the church, temples are regarded as sacred houses of the Lord. Once dedicated, only church members with a current temple recommend can enter for worship.

== Gallery ==
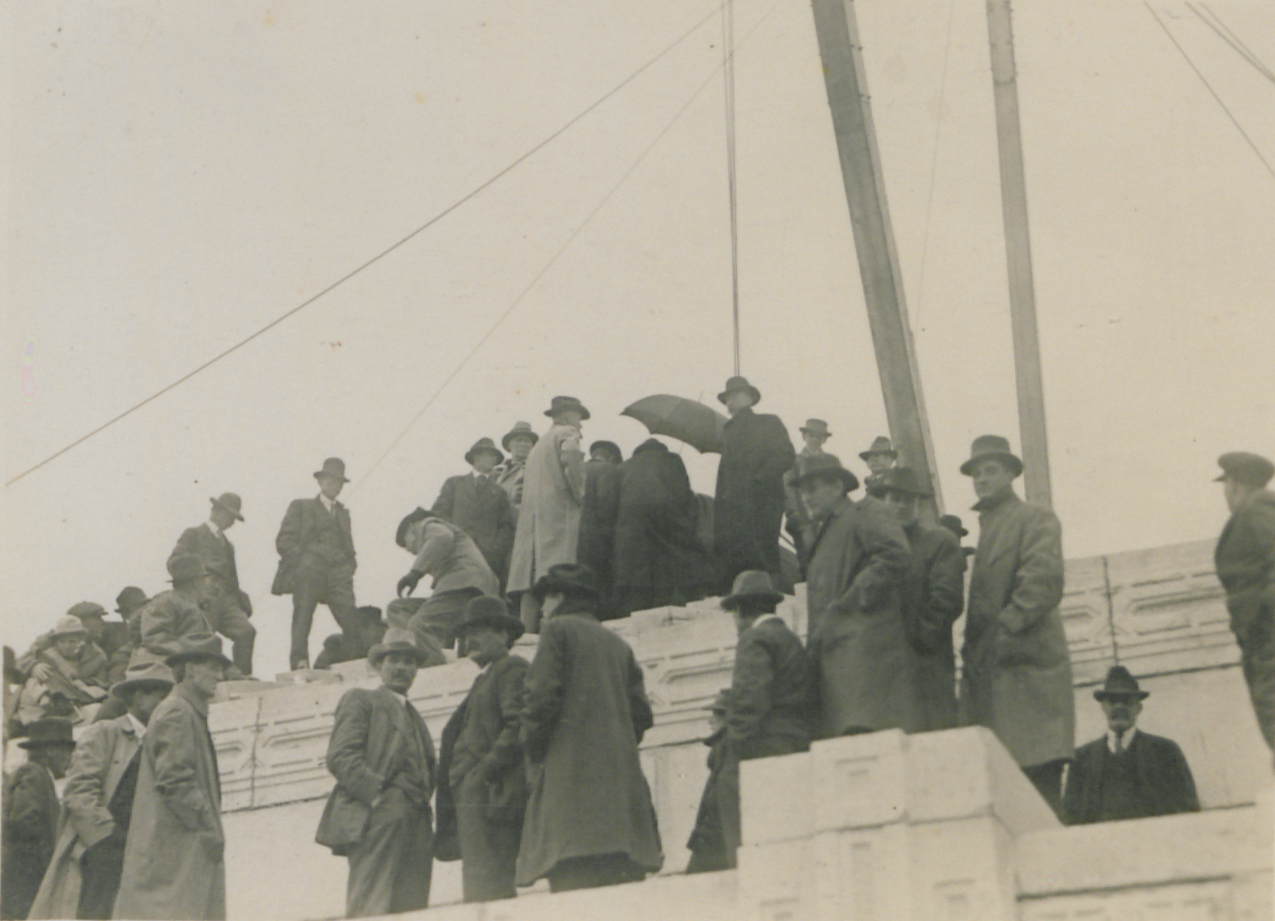
Laying of last stone on the temple

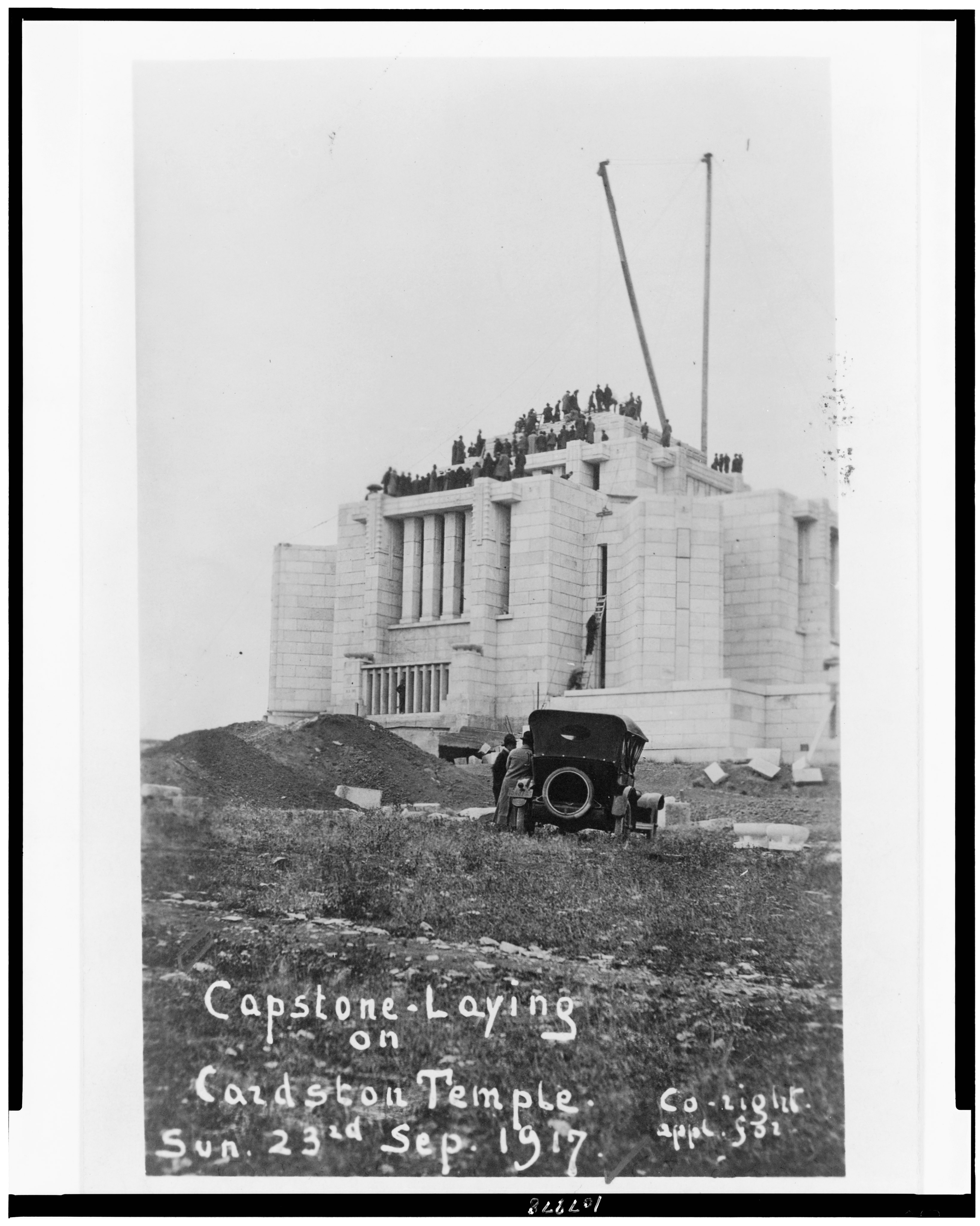
Capstone laying on Cardston Temple

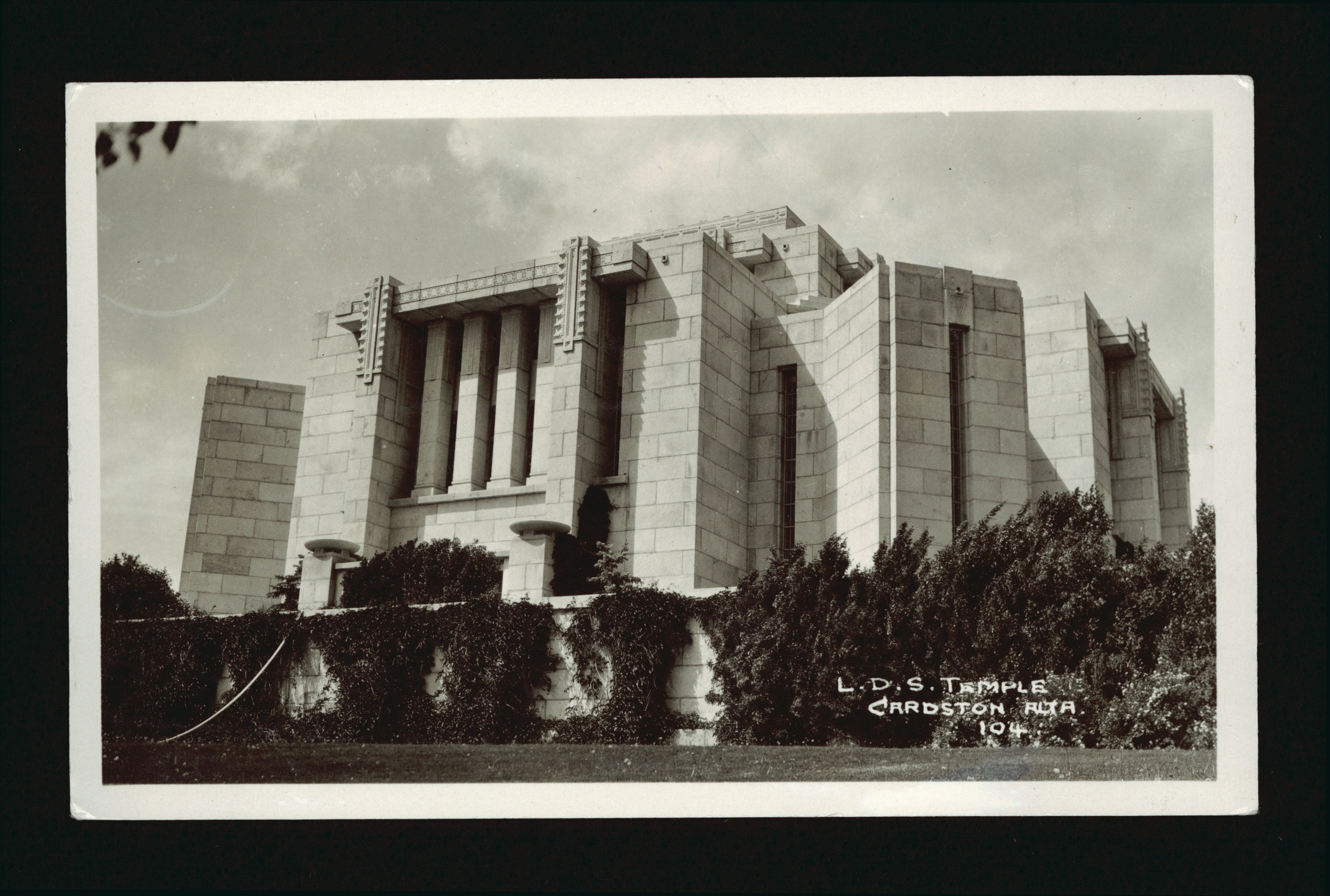
A close-up of the side of the temple

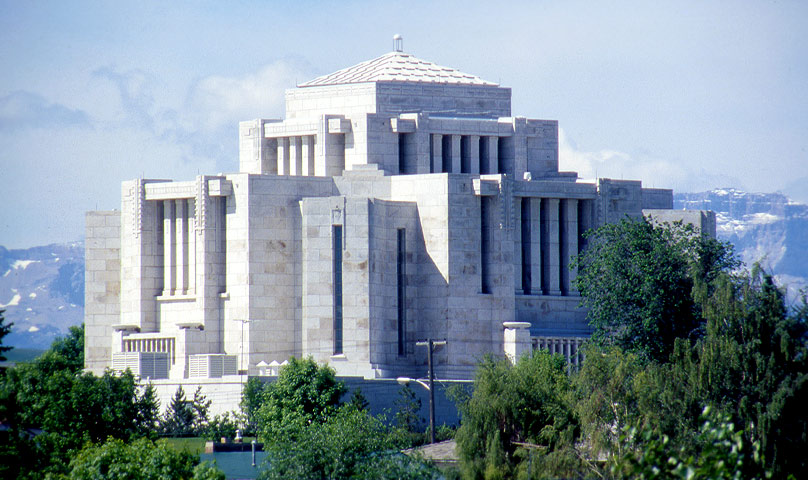
Modern photo of the temple

== See also ==
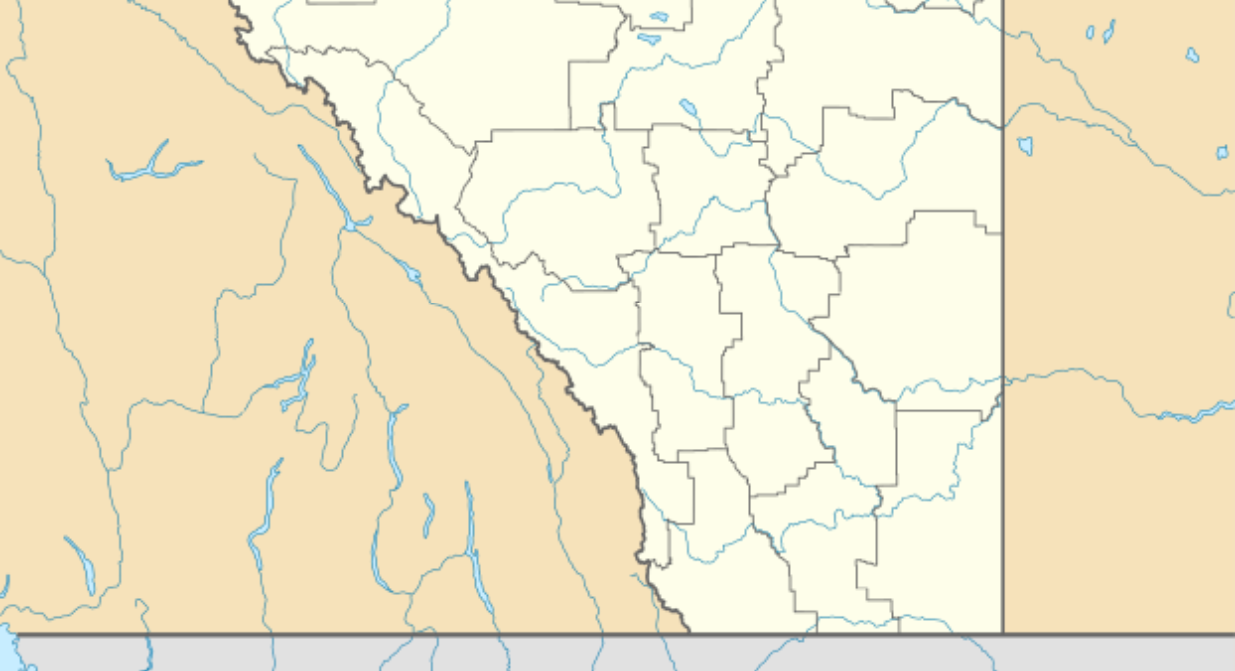

Temples in Alberta

Canada Temples
Temples in Canada

= Operating
= Under construction
= Announced
= Temporarily Closed

- Torleif S. Knaphus — sculpted the large bas relief titled Christ the Fountainhead on the exterior of the building and also the life-size oxen holding the baptism font
- LeConte Stewart — painted murals and other art work in the temple
- List of National Historic Sites of Canada in Alberta
- Comparison of temples (LDS Church)
- List of temples (LDS Church)
- List of temples by geographic region (LDS Church)
- Temple architecture (LDS Church)
- The Church of Jesus Christ of Latter-day Saints in Canada
