= South Saskatchewan Region =

- Land-use framework region
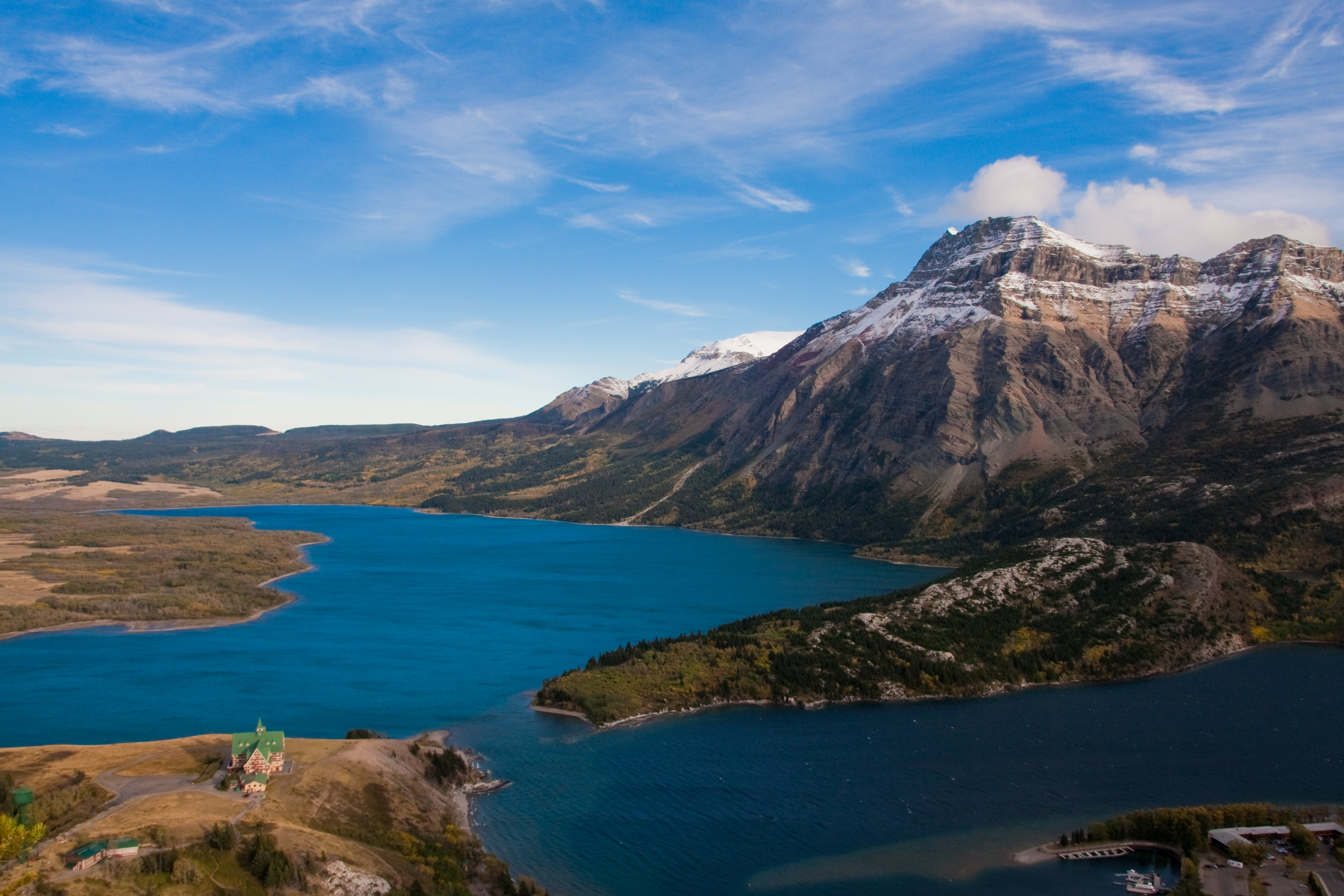
- Waterton Lakes National Park

- Location in Alberta
- Largest population centres: Calgary; Lethbridge; Medicine Hat

Government
  - Parent authority: Alberta Environment and Parks

Area
  - Total: 83,774 km^{2} (32,345 sq mi)

Population (2016)
  - Total: 1,814,190
  - Density: 21.656/km^{2} (56.088/sq mi)

The South Saskatchewan Region is a land-use framework region in southern Alberta, Canada. One of seven in the province, each is intended to develop and implement a regional plan, complementing the planning efforts of member municipalities in order to coordinate future growth. Corresponding roughly to major watersheds while following municipal boundaries, these regions are managed by Alberta Environment and Parks.

As it includes the Calgary Metropolitan Region, the largest urban area in Alberta, the South Saskatchewan Region has the highest population of any Alberta land-use region.

== Communities ==
The following municipalities are contained in the South Saskatchewan Region.

Cities

- Airdrie
- Brooks
- Calgary
- Chestermere
- Lethbridge
- Medicine Hat

Towns

- Bassano
- Black Diamond
- Bow Island
- Canmore
- Cardston
- Claresholm
- Coaldale
- Coalhurst
- Cochrane
- Crossfield
- Fort Macleod
- Granum
- High River
- Irricana
- Magrath
- Milk River
- Nanton
- Nobleford
- Okotoks
- Picture Butte
- Pincher Creek
- Raymond
- Redcliff
- Stavely
- Strathmore
- Taber
- Turner Valley
- Vauxhall
- Vulcan

Villages

- Arrowwood
- Barnwell
- Barons
- Beiseker
- Carmangay
- Champion
- Coutts
- Cowley
- Duchess
- Foremost
- Glenwood
- Hill Spring
- Hussar
- Lomond
- Longview
- Milo
- Rockyford
- Rosemary
- Standard
- Stirling
- Warner

Summer villages

- Ghost Lake
- Waiparous

Municipal districts

- Municipal District of Bighorn
- Cardston County
- Cypress County
- Foothills County
- County of Forty Mile
- Lethbridge County
- County of Newell
- Municipal District of Pincher Creek
- Municipal District of Ranchland
- Rocky View County
- Municipal District of Taber
- Vulcan County
- County of Warner No. 5
- Wheatland County
- Municipal District of Willow Creek

Specialized municipalities

- Crowsnest Pass

Improvement districts

- Improvement District No. 4 (Waterton)
- Kananaskis Improvement District

Indian reserves

- Blood 148
- Blood 148A
- Eden Valley 216
- Piikani 147
- Peigan Timber Limit B
- Siksika 146
- Stoney 142, 143, 144
- Stoney 142B
- Tsuu T'ina 145
