= Alberta Highway 25 =

Highway in Alberta, Canada

Highway 25

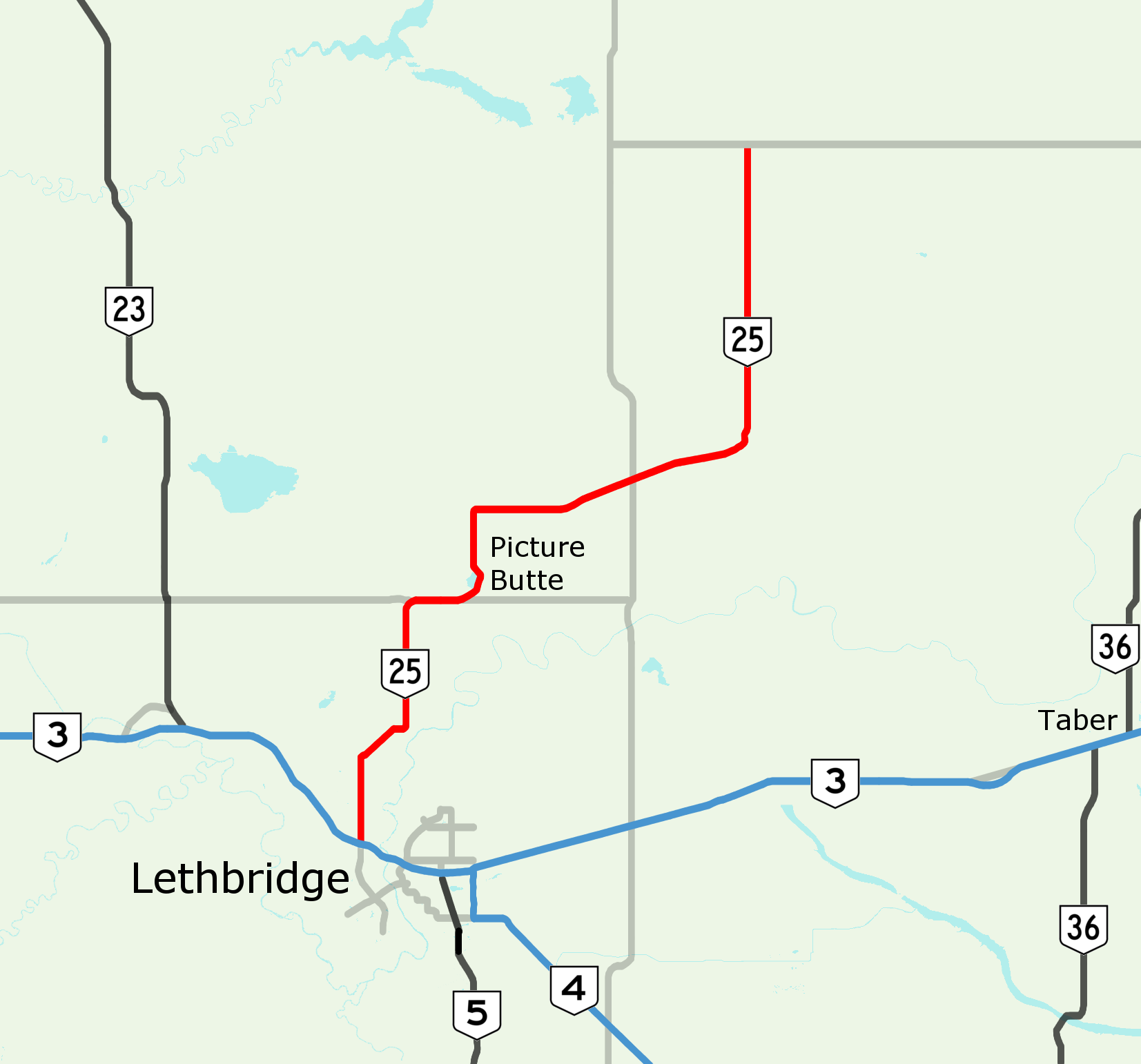
- Highway 25 highlighted in red

Route information
- Maintained by the Ministry of Transportation and Economic Corridors
- Length: 71.7 km (44.6 mi)

Major junctions
- South end: Highway 3 in Lethbridge
- Highway 519 near Picture Butte
- North end: Highway 526 near Enchant

Location
- Country: Canada
- Province: Alberta
- Specialized and rural municipalities: Lethbridge County, M.D. of Taber
- Major cities: Lethbridge
- Towns: Picture Butte

Highway system
- Alberta Provincial Highway Network; List; Former
| ← Highway 24 | → Highway 26 |

Highway 25 is a highway in southern Alberta, Canada, north of Lethbridge.

Highway 25 begins at an interchange with Highway 3 on the northwestern outskirts of Lethbridge. University Drive extends south into West Lethbridge as a major thoroughfare, but is not designated as Highway 25.

It proceeds north passing by the hamlets of Diamond City and Shaughnessy until it comes to Highway 519 where it turns east and then goes north just after the Town of Picture Butte. It continues north until it reaches Highway 843 where it turns east again. It passes by the Hamlet of Iron Springs; crosses Highway 845; and reaches the Hamlet of Turin.

Just north of Turin, Highway 521 branches off to the east as Highway 25 moves north and ends when it meets Highway 526 west of the Hamlet of Enchant.

== Major intersections ==
From south to north:

| Rural/specialized municipality | Location | km | mi | Destinations | Notes |
|---|---|---|---|---|---|
| City of Lethbridge | | −4.3 | −2.7 | University Drive – University of Lethbridge Whoop-Up Drive – City Centre | Interchange; University Drive continues south |
| City of Lethbridge | | −2.2 | −1.4 | Walsh Drive / Heritage Boulevard | To former Highway 3A west |
| City of Lethbridge | | −1.6 | −0.99 | Bridge Drive | Former Highway 3A east |
| City of Lethbridge | | 0.0 | 0.0 | Highway 3 – Fort Macleod, Calgary, Lethbridge | Interchange; University Drive north end; Highway 25 southern terminus |
| Lethbridge County | | 4.4 | 2.7 | Township Road 94 – Coalhurst | |
| Lethbridge County | | 6.2 | 3.9 | PAR 101 north – Park Lake Provincial Park | |
| Lethbridge County | Diamond City | 10.9 | 6.8 | | |
| Lethbridge County | Shaughnessy | 16.9 | 10.5 | | |
| Lethbridge County | | 19.4 | 12.1 | Highway 519 west – Nobleford, Granum | South end of Highway 519 concurrency |
| Lethbridge County | Picture Butte | 23.0 | 14.3 | Highway 519 east / Highway 843 south (Rogers Avenue) | North end of Highway 519 concurrency; south end of Highway 843 concurrency |
| Lethbridge County | | 29.7 | 18.5 | Highway 843 north | North end of Highway 843 concurrency |
| Lethbridge County | Iron Springs | 36.6 | 22.7 | | |
| Lethbridge County | | 41.9 | 26.0 | Highway 845 – Lomond, Coaldale | |
| Lethbridge County | Turin | 48.7 | 30.3 | | |
| Lethbridge County | | 52.2 | 32.4 | Highway 521 east – Taber, Vauxhall | |
| M.D. of Taber | | 71.7 | 44.6 | Highway 526 – Lomond, Enchant | |
1.000 mi = 1.609 km; 1.000 km = 0.621 mi: Closed/former; Concurrency terminus
