= Alberta Highway 519 =

Highway in Alberta, Canada

Highway 519
- Highway 519 highlighted in red

Route information
- Maintained by Alberta Transportation
- Length: 65.0 km (40.4 mi)
- History: 1979 (paved)

Major junctions
- West end: Highway 2 in Granum
- Highway 811 near Granum; Highway 23 near Nobleford; Highway 25 near Picture Butte
- East end: Highway 845 near Picture Butte

Location
- Country: Canada
- Province: Alberta
- Specialized and rural municipalities: Willow Creek, Lethbridge
- Towns: Granum, Picture Butte, Nobleford

Highway system
- Alberta Numbered Highway Network; List; Former
← Highway 515	→ Highway 520

Alberta Provincial Highway No. 519, commonly referred to as Highway 519, is an east-west highway in southern Alberta, Canada, stretching from Highway 2 near Granum through Picture Butte to Highway 845. In tandem with Highway 23, Highway 519 is often used by traffic in the CANAMEX Corridor to bypass Fort Macleod on the route between Calgary and Lethbridge.

== Route description ==
Highway 519 is a two-lane undivided highway that begins in the Municipal District of Willow Creek in Granum at an intersection with Highway 2. At a speed limit of 60 km/h (37 mph), it proceeds east through the town after which the speed limit increases to 100 km/h (62 mph) and the highway reaches Highway 811 which turns south to Fort Macleod. After crossing into Lethbridge County, It reaches a roundabout at Highway 23, after which the speed limit drops to 70 km/h (43 mph) before passing the town of Nobleford and crossing a branch of the Canadian Pacific Railway. The speed limit then increases to 100 km/h (62 mph) again. North of Shaughnessy, it merges with Highway 25 with which it is briefly concurrent until Picture Butte where Highway 25 splits north to Iron Springs while Highway 519 continues east to end at Highway 845 near the Oldman River.

== Major intersections ==
Rural/specialized municipality	Location	km	mi	Destinations	Notes
MD Willow Creek No. 26	Granum	0.0	0.0	Highway 2 – Fort Macleod, Calgary	
MD Willow Creek No. 26		8.2	5.1	Highway 811 south – Fort Macleod	
Lethbridge County		31.6	19.6	Highway 23 – Vulcan, Lethbridge	Roundabout
Lethbridge County		49.3	30.6	Highway 25 south – Shaughnessy, Lethbridge	West end of Hwy 25 concurrency
Lethbridge County	Picture Butte	52.9	32.9	Highway 25 north / Highway 843 north – Iron Springs, Enchant	East end of Hwy 25 concurrency; west end of Hwy 843 concurrency
Lethbridge County	Picture Butte	53.8	33.4	Highway 843 south	East end of Hwy 843 concurrency
Lethbridge County		65.0	40.4	Highway 845 – Lomond, Coaldale	
1.000 mi = 1.609 km; 1.000 km = 0.621 mi: Concurrency terminus
