= List of Canadian tornadoes in 2023 =

This page documents all tornadoes confirmed by Environment Canada and the University of Western Ontario's Northern Tornadoes Project (NTP) in Canada throughout 2023. Based on statistical modelling by Sills et al. (2012), an average of 230 tornadoes likely occur across the country each year; however, only 61 of these are actually documented annually based on 1980–2009 averages. This makes Canada the second-most active country in the world for tornadoes. The majority of confirmed events occur in the more densely populated areas of southern Canada, where people are around to report them. In Alberta specifically, meteorologists estimated that 30–50 percent of tornadoes that actually occur go unreported, with NTP executive director David Sills stating, "we just don't get reports from the moose." In an attempt to better document the nation's tornadoes, the NTP was founded in 2017 as a joint venture by the University of Western Ontario and ImpactWX. Their initial scope was to catalogue previously unrecognized tornadoes in densely forested areas across Ontario and Quebec; however, this later expanded to tornadoes nationwide in 2019.

The year started slowly, possibly due to thunderstorm activity being suppressed by smoke from record-breaking wildfires. The first tornado of 2023 occurred on May 11 in Alberta while the strongest was an EF4 tornado on July 1, also in Alberta. The most active day of the year was an outbreak of 10 EF0 tornadoes on June 14 in rural areas of Alberta.

== Annual summary ==
Monthly statistics of Canadian tornadoes during 2023 (Note: All dates are based on the local time zone where the tornado touched down; however, all times are in Coordinated Universal Time for consistency.)
Month	Total	Enhanced Fujita scale rating						Deaths	Injuries
Month	Total	EF0	EF1	EF2	EF3	EF4	EF5	Deaths	Injuries
January	0	0	0	0	0	0	0	0	0
February	0	0	0	0	0	0	0	0	0
March	0	0	0	0	0	0	0	0	0
April	0	0	0	0	0	0	0	0	0
May	3	2	1	0	0	0	0	0	0
June	25	22	3	0	0	0	0	0	0
July	18	10	7	0	0	1	0	0	1
August	1	1	0	0	0	0	0	0	0
Total	47	35	11	0	0	1	0	0	1

== List of confirmed tornadoes ==
List of confirmed Canadian tornadoes in 2023
EF#	Location	County / District / Municipality	Province	Start Coord.	Date	Time (UTC)	Path length	Max width
EF1	S of Cayley	Foothills	Alberta	50.42°N 113.85°W	May 11	00:07	—N/a	—N/a
EF1	A brief landspout tornado was videoed; no damage was observed. This was the first landspout classified as a tornado by the NTP following a change in operations in June 2023.							
EF1	S of Regina	Sherwood No. 159	Saskatchewan	50.3553°N 104.5535°W	May 27	01:52	0.6 km (0.37 mi)	200 m (220 yd)
EF1	A brief tornado tore the roof from a large machine shed, causing one of its walls to collapse, and scattered debris up to 2.5 km (1.6 mi) downstream. The tornado was described as being unusual for this time of year. Equally unusual is that this was the only tornado reported in Saskatchewan in 2023.							
EF0	N of Botha	Stettler No. 6	Alberta	52.3486°N 112.5536°W	May 31	22:35	2.33 km (1.45 mi)	240 m (260 yd)
EF0	A tornado was videoed and high-resolution satellite imagery revealed a damage swath through crop fields.							
EF0	NW of Carberry	North Cypress – Langford	Manitoba	49.8844°N 99.3714°W	June 4	23:53	0.46 km (0.29 mi)	70 m (77 yd)
EF0	A brief landspout tornado was videoed; no damage occurred.							
EF0	S of Lomond	Vulcan	Alberta	50.30°N 112.63°W	June 11	00:55	—N/a	—N/a
EF0	A tornado was videoed; no damage occurred.							
EF0	S of Beachville	South-West Oxford	Ontario	43.068°N 80.83°W	June 13	23:39	—N/a	—N/a
EF0	A brief tornado was videoed; no damage occurred.							
EF0	NW of Talbotville	Southwold	Ontario	42.8062°N 81.2567°W	June 13	00:30	2.44 km (1.52 mi)	40 m (44 yd)
EF0	A brief tornado tossed patio furniture at a restaurant and damaged trees. A 2x4 was lodged into the wall of the building.							
EF0	N of Iron Springs	Lethbridge	Alberta	49.949°N 112.694°W	June 14	20:20	—N/a	—N/a
EF0	A brief tornado was videoed; no damage occurred.							
EF0	N of Turin	Lethbridge	Alberta	50.013°N 112.538°W	June 14	20:42	—N/a	—N/a
EF0	A brief tornado was videoed; no damage occurred.							
EF0	NW of Turin	Lethbridge	Alberta	50.007°N 112.629°W	June 14	20:46	—N/a	—N/a
EF0	A brief tornado was videoed; no damage occurred.							
EF0	NNW of Turin	Lethbridge	Alberta	50.039°N 112.613°W	June 14	20:58	—N/a	—N/a
EF0	A brief tornado was videoed; no damage occurred.							
EF0	SW of Enchant	Taber	Alberta	50.119°N 112.443°W	June 14	21:15	—N/a	—N/a
EF0	A brief tornado was videoed; no damage occurred.							
EF0	SE of Enchant	Taber	Alberta	50.128°N 112.346°W	June 14	21:23	—N/a	—N/a
EF0	A brief tornado was videoed; an irrigation pivot was overturned.							
EF0	S of Brooks	Newell	Alberta	50.437°N 111.939°W	June 14	22:12	—N/a	—N/a
EF0	A brief waterspout was videoed over Lake Newell; the NTP classified it as an EF0 tornado. No damage occurred.							
EF0	SE of Brooks	Newell	Alberta	50.52°N 111.854°W	June 14	22:35	—N/a	—N/a
EF0	A brief tornado was videoed; no damage occurred.							
EF0	N of Vermilion	Vermilion River	Alberta	53.40°N 110.85°W	June 14	22:40	—N/a	—N/a
EF0	A brief tornado was videoed; no damage occurred.							
EF0	S of Cabin Lake	Special Area No. 3	Alberta	51.01°N 111.22°W	June 14	00:07	—N/a	—N/a
EF0	A brief tornado was videoed; no damage occurred.							
EF1	NNE of Carpenter (ND) to William Lake Provincial Park (MB)	Rolette (ND), Morton (MB)	North Dakota (USA), Manitoba	48.9983°N 99.9603°W	June 20	02:35	≥6.5 km (4.0 mi)	≥210 m (230 yd)
EF1	Aerial surveys revealed a tornado touched down just south of the Canada–United States border and moved northeast into Canada. Damage was confined to trees. Only the Canadian portion of the track was surveyed.							
EF1	NW of Killarney to SE of Ninette	Killarney-Turtle Mountain, Prairie Lakes	Manitoba	49.2331°N 99.748°W	June 20	02:55	17.5 km (10.9 mi)	1,200 m (1,300 yd)
EF1	A large tornado was confirmed through aerial surveys; details pending.							
EF1	NE of MacGregor	North Norfolk	Manitoba	49.9906°N 98.6987°W	June 20	04:30	6.8 km (4.2 mi)	800 m (870 yd)
EF1	This tornado occurred within a broader area of straight-line winds. Grain bins were tossed and trees were downed and/or damaged.							
EF0	RiverWest	Windsor	Ontario	42.2903°N 83.0542°W	June 25	22:45	2.02 km (1.26 mi)	180 m (200 yd)
EF0	A brief, dusty tornado caused minor tree damage.							
EF0	Forest Glade to Tecumseh	Windsor	Ontario	42.3057°N 82.9091°W	June 25	23:00	4.69 km (2.91 mi)	120 m (130 yd)
EF0	A tornado moved through eastern areas of Windsor, causing minor roof damage to multiple homes and snapping tree branches.							
EF0	S of Clearview	Clearview	Ontario	44.3857°N 80.1035°W	June 26	19:20	2.82 km (1.75 mi)	120 m (130 yd)
EF0	A short-lived tornado caused minor damage to homes, fences, trees, and crops.							
EF0	SSW of Tweed	Tweed	Ontario	44.4531°N 77.3223°W	June 26	20:35	6.13 km (3.81 mi)	450 m (490 yd)
EF0	A weak tornado moved along the western side of Stoco Lake.							
EF0	NE of Tweed	Tweed	Ontario	44.4911°N 77.2735°W	June 26	20:45	3.28 km (2.04 mi)	240 m (260 yd)
EF0	A weak tornado touched down near where the first Tweed tornado dissipated along the northern end of Stoco Lake.							
EF0	ENE of Neepawa	WestLake – Gladstone	Manitoba	50.26°N 99.20°W	June 26	23:05	—N/a	—N/a
EF0	A brief tornado was videoed; no damage occurred.							
EF0	SW of Venlaw	Grandview	Manitoba	51.2682°N 100.5483°W	June 28	17:53	1.29 km (0.80 mi)	10 m (11 yd)
EF0	A brief, narrow tornado caused minor crop damage.							
EF0	SSE of Brookdale	North Cypress – Langford	Manitoba	50.0051°N 99.5363°W	June 28	19:20	0.8 km (0.50 mi)	10 m (11 yd)
EF0	A brief, narrow tornado caused minor crop damage.							
EF4	SW of Didsbury to ENE of Carstairs	Mountain View	Alberta	51.6114°N 114.1989°W	July 1	19:45–20:15	15.3 km (9.5 mi)	620 m (680 yd)
EF4	This violent tornado initially touched down over rural areas southwest of Didsbury, oscillating in intensity as it moved east. The tornado produced EF4 damage along Highway 2A between Didsbury and Carstairs. There, a well-built home was completely destroyed; the sole occupant was injured. Near this home, a 22,000 lb (10,000 kg) combine harvester was thrown 160 ft (50 m) before being rolled a further 160 to 330 ft (50 to 100 m). Trees were stubbed and debarked on the property. Power lines were downed and one gas leak occurred at a destroyed home. Significant ground scouring was observed in the area. The tornado turned east-southeast from this location, eventually crossing Highway 2 before dissipating. Altogether, three homes were destroyed, four were rendered uninhabitable, and five were damaged. Twenty-five cows, twenty chickens, and one horse were also killed.							
EF0	Southern Hamilton	Hamilton (City of)	Ontario	43.1975°N 79.8423°W	July 4	20:45	0.64 km (0.40 mi)	20 m (22 yd)
EF0	A brief tornado touched down in the Templemead neighbourhood of southern Hamilton. One business had minor roof damage. This was the first tornado to strike the city in 18 years.							
EF1	Hine Lake	Thunder Bay, Unorganized	Ontario	49.3028°N 89.9400°W	July 9	23:45	12 km (7.5 mi)	400 m (440 yd)
EF1	A tornado was analyzed in a forested area through satellite imagery. The full path is uncertain pending cloud-free satellite images.							
EF1	Barrhaven (1st tornado)	Ottawa (City of)	Ontario	45.2654°N 75.7598°W	July 13	12:49	1.13 km (0.70 mi)	150 m (160 yd)
EF1	Dozens of homes sustained minor to moderate roof damage, including a couple that had portions peeled away. Some trees were snapped or uprooted.							
EF1	Barrhaven (2nd tornado)	Ottawa (City of)	Ontario	45.2451°N 75.7519°W	July 13	16:45	4.92 km (3.06 mi)	200 m (220 yd)
EF1	Dozens of homes sustained minor to moderate roof damage, including a couple that had portions peeled away. Some trees were snapped or uprooted.							
EF0	Embrun	Russell	Ontario	45.2715°N 75.2880°W	July 13	17:17	1.14 km (0.71 mi)	80 m (87 yd)
EF0	A brief, narrow tornado caused minor roof damage to homes and damaged trees.							
EF0	Fournier to Fenaghvale	The Nation	Ontario	45.4379°N 74.9346°W	July 13	17:55	9.62 km (5.98 mi)	510 m (560 yd)
EF0	Damage was limited to trees and crops.							
EF0	Mirabel	Mirabel	Quebec	45.65°N 74.01°W	July 13	19:23	—N/a	—N/a
EF0	An observer at Montréal–Mirabel International Airport reported a tornado.							
EF0	Saint-Thomas	Saint-Thomas	Quebec	45.9952°N 73.3631°W	July 13	20:25	6.61 km (4.11 mi)	200 m (220 yd)
EF0	Two barns and a home sustained minor roof damage and trees were snapped.							
EF0	W of Okotoks	Foothills County	Alberta	50.657°N 114.096°W	July 17	20:39	—N/a	—N/a
EF0	A landspout tornado was observed.							
EF0	S of Whitla	Forty Mile No. 8	Alberta	49.70°N 111.01°W	July 17	01:30	—N/a	—N/a
EF0	A non-damaging tornado was documented.							
EF1	Brompton	Sherbrooke	Quebec	45.466°N 71.9888°W	July 18	20:30	3.93 km (2.44 mi)	370 m (400 yd)
EF1	Barns, trees, and crops were damaged. At least two barns partially collapsed, one of which was properly anchor bolted to its foundation.							
EF0	Near Bathurst	None (in water)	New Brunswick	47.69°N 65.63°W	July 20	20:09	10.5 km (6.5 mi)	175 m (191 yd)
EF0	A tornado was observed over Chaleur Bay.							
EF0	E of Petrolia	Enniskillen	Ontario	42.8798°N 82.0240°W	July 20	20:25	2.91 km (1.81 mi)	300 m (330 yd)
EF0	Trees, crops, and one power pole were damaged.							
EF1	South Buxton to SE of Sandison	Chatham-Kent	Ontario	42.2915°N 82.1855°W	July 20	20:50	10.5 km (6.5 mi)	175 m (191 yd)
EF1	Multiple homes sustained varying degrees of roof damage. One had up to 20 percent of its roof torn off. Crops and trees were also damaged.							
EF0	Lake Nipissing	West Nipissing	Ontario	46.225°N 79.857°W	July 20	22:50	10.5 km (6.5 mi)	175 m (191 yd)
EF0	A tornado was observed over Lake Nipissing.							
EF1	Blenheim	Chatham-Kent	Ontario	42.3073°N 82.0649°W	July 26	20:35	9.77 km (6.07 mi)	300 m (330 yd)
EF1	Trees were snapped or uprooted, at least one home had moderate roof damage, and a garage was destroyed.							
EF1	W of Beaver Creek	Unorganized Division No. 19	Manitoba	51.3597°N 97.1247°W	July 26	23:23	2 km (1.2 mi)	170 m (190 yd)
EF1	A tornado caused tree and crop damage. Full survey details pending analysis of satellite imagery as of July 29.							
EF0	Findlay Creek (1st Tornado)	Ottawa	Ontario	45.288°N 75.6262°W	August 3	17:36	6.1 km (3.8 mi)	130 m (140 yd)
EF0	A few homes and sheds sustained minor damage, a trailer was flipped, and trees were damaged.							
EF0	Findlay Creek (2nd Tornado, then later updated)	Ottawa	Ontario	45.288°N 75.6262°W	August 3	17:36	6.1 km (3.8 mi)	130 m (140 yd)
EF0	A few homes and sheds sustained minor damage, a trailer was flipped, and trees were damaged.							
