= Alberta Highway 23 =

Highway in Alberta, Canada

Highway 23
- Highway 23 highlighted in red

Route information
- Maintained by the Ministry of Transportation and Economic Corridors
- Length: 135.2 km (84.0 mi)

Major junctions
- South end: Highway 3 near Monarch
- Highway 3A near Monarch; Highway 519 near Nobleford; Highway 24 near Vulcan
- North end: Highway 2 in High River

Location
- Country: Canada
- Province: Alberta
- Specialized and rural municipalities: Lethbridge County, Vulcan County, Foothills County
- Towns: Vulcan, High River
- Villages: Barons, Carmangay, Champion

Highway system
- Alberta Numbered Highway Network; List; Former
← Highway 22X	→ Highway 24

Highway 23 is a highway in southern Alberta, Canada, east of Highway 2 that serves as an alternate route between Calgary and Lethbridge.

It begins at Highway 3 (Crowsnest Highway) 21 km (13 mi) west of Lethbridge near the Hamlet of Monarch and shares a short concurrency with Highway 3A. It continues north and passes by the Villages of Nobleford, Barons, and Carmangay before it crosses the Little Bow River. It continues north, passing through the Hamlet of Kirkcaldy and Town of Vulcan before it meets the junction of Highway 24 and Highway 542. From there, the highway turns west and passes near just north of the Hamlet of Brant and just south of the Hamlet of Blackie before skirting Frank Lake. It intersects Highway 2 and enters the Town of High River along 12 Avenue SE before becoming Highway 2A at 10 Street SE. In tandem with Highway 519, the southernmost portion of Highway 23 is frequently used as a bypass of Fort Macleod.

== Major intersections ==
From south to north:

Rural/specialized municipality	Location	km	mi	Destinations	Notes
Lethbridge County	Monarch	0.0	0.0	Highway 3 east (Crowsnest Highway) / Highway 3A begins – Lethbridge	Interchange; westbound exit and eastbound entrance; south end of Highway 3A concurrency
Lethbridge County	Monarch	1.5	0.93	Highway 3A west to Highway 3 west – Monarch, Fort Macleod	Interchange; north end of Highway 3A concurrency
Lethbridge County	Nobleford	9.6	6.0	Highway 519 – Granum, Picture Butte	
Lethbridge County	Barons	22.6	14.0	Highway 520 east	South end Highway 520 of concurrency
Lethbridge County		27.6	17.1	Highway 520 west – Claresholm	North end of Highway 520 concurrency
Vulcan County	Carmangay	38.8	24.1	UAR 161 east	
Vulcan County	Champion	54.5	33.9	Highway 529 – Parkland, Little Bow Provincial Park	
Vulcan County	Vulcan	72.2	44.9	Highway 534 – Nanton, Lomond	
Vulcan County		91.8	57.0	Highway 542 east – Milo Highway 24 north – Mossleigh, Strathmore	Directional signage changes from north-south to east-west
Foothills County		109.4	68.0	Highway 804 south – Brant	
Foothills County		118.0	73.3	Highway 799 north – Blackie	
High River		134.0– 135.2	83.3– 84.0	Highway 2 – Calgary, Fort Macleod, Lethbridge	Interchange; Highway 2 exit 194; Highway 23 western terminus at High River town limits (just west of interchange); becomes 12 Avenue SE
High River		136.2	84.6	10 Street SE / 12 Avenue SE	Former Highway 2A; former Highway 23 western terminus
1.000 mi = 1.609 km; 1.000 km = 0.621 mi: Closed/former; Concurrency terminus; Incomplete access
