= Commerce, Alberta =

Commerce Coalgate (1912–1913)
- Former village
- Location of Commerce in Alberta
- Coordinates: 49.917°N 112.939°W
- Country: Canada
- Province: Alberta
- Region: Southern Alberta
- Census division: 2
- Municipal district: Lethbridge County
- Founded: 1912
- Incorporated (village): July 9, 1912
- Name change: December 17, 1913
- Dissolved: May 13, 1926

Government
  - Governing body: County of Lethbridge Council
- Time zone: UTC−06:00 (Alberta Time)

Commerce is a former village in southern Alberta, Canada within Lethbridge County. It was located within township 9, range 22, west of the fourth meridian, northwest of the City of Lethbridge between the Village of Nobleford and the Town of Picture Butte. It was known as the Village of Coalgate from 1912 to 1913.

== History ==
The community was founded in 1912 as a residential area for the Chinook coal mine northwest of Lethbridge. It was incorporated as the Village of Coalgate on July 9, 1912. The village was renamed to Commerce on December 17, 1913 to reflect the name of its post office. Its population in 1913 was 294.

The Chinook coal mine closed on January 25, 1924, and its population declined to an estimated 100 in 1924 and an estimated 50 in 1925. The village subsequently dissolved on May 13, 1926.

== Demographics ==
Population history of Commerce
Year	Pop.	±%
1916	212	—
1921	360	+69.8%
1926	55	−84.7%
Source: Statistics Canada

In the 1921 Census, Commerce had a population of 360.

== See also ==
- List of communities in Alberta
- List of former urban municipalities in Alberta
- List of ghost towns in Alberta
