= Eastview Acres, Alberta =

Eastview Acres
- Designated place
- Location of Eastview Acres Eastview Acres (Canada)
- Coordinates: 49.789°N 113.016°W
- Country: Canada
- Province: Alberta
- Region: Southern Alberta
- Census division: 2
- Municipal district: Lethbridge County

Government
  - Type: Unincorporated
  - Governing body: Lethbridge County Council

Area (2021)
  - Land: 1.17 km^{2} (0.45 sq mi)

Population (2021)
  - Total: 45
  - Density: 38.3/km^{2} (99/sq mi)
- Time zone: UTC−06:00 (Alberta Time)
- Area codes: 403, 587, 825

Eastview Acres is an unincorporated community in Alberta, Canada within the Lethbridge County that is recognized as a designated place by Statistics Canada. It is located on the east side of Highway 3, 3 km (1.9 mi) east of Highway 23.

== Demographics ==
In the 2021 Census of Population conducted by Statistics Canada, Eastview Acres had a population of 45 living in 15 of its 15 total private dwellings, a change of 18.4% from its 2016 population of 38. With a land area of 1.17 km^{2} (0.45 sq mi), it had a population density of 38.5/km^{2} (99.6/sq mi) in 2021.

As a designated place in the 2016 Census of Population conducted by Statistics Canada, Eastview Acres had a population of 38 living in 14 of its 14 total private dwellings, a change of 153.3% from its 2011 population of 15. With a land area of 1.17 km^{2} (0.45 sq mi), it had a population density of 32.5/km^{2} (84.1/sq mi) in 2016.

== See also ==
- List of communities in Alberta
- List of designated places in Alberta
