= Sunset Acres, Alberta =

Sunset Acres
- Designated place
- Location of Sunset Acres Sunset Acres (Canada)
- Coordinates: 49.665°N 112.939°W
- Country: Canada
- Province: Alberta
- Region: Southern Alberta
- Census division: 2
- Municipal district: Lethbridge County

Government
  - Type: Unincorporated
  - Governing body: Lethbridge County Council

Area (2021)
  - Land: 0.17 km^{2} (0.066 sq mi)

Population (2021)
  - Total: 60
  - Density: 354.8/km^{2} (919/sq mi)
- Time zone: UTC−06:00 (Alberta Time)
- Area codes: 403, 587, 825

Sunset Acres is an unincorporated community in Alberta, Canada within the Lethbridge County recognized as a designated place by Statistics Canada. It is located on the west side of Range Road 224, 1.6 km (1.0 mi) west of Lethbridge city limits and 8 km (5.0 mi) south of Highway 3.

== Demographics ==
In the 2021 Census of Population conducted by Statistics Canada, Sunset Acres had a population of 60 living in 22 of its 22 total private dwellings, a change of 5.3% from its 2016 population of 57. With a land area of 0.17 km^{2} (0.066 sq mi), it had a population density of 352.9/km^{2} (914.1/sq mi) in 2021.

As a designated place in the 2016 Census of Population conducted by Statistics Canada, Sunset Acres had a population of 57 living in 22 of its 22 total private dwellings, a change of −6.6% from its 2011 population of 61. With a land area of 0.17 km^{2} (0.066 sq mi), it had a population density of 335.3/km^{2} (868.4/sq mi) in 2016.

== See also ==
- List of communities in Alberta
- List of designated places in Alberta
