= Alberta Highway 3A =

Highway in Alberta, Canada

Highway 3A

Route information
- Auxiliary route of Highway 3
- Maintained by the Ministry of Transportation and Economic Corridors

Location
- Country: Canada
- Province: Alberta

Highway system
- Alberta Numbered Highway Network; List; Former
← Highway 3	→ Highway 4

Highway 3A is the designation of four alternate routes of Highway 3 in southern Alberta, Canada. All four segments are former alignments of Highway 3, also known as the Crowsnest Highway, distributed across a broad east-west corridor of southern Alberta from the foothills east of the Crowsnest Pass to the irrigated agricultural district east of Lethbridge.

== Lundbreck ==
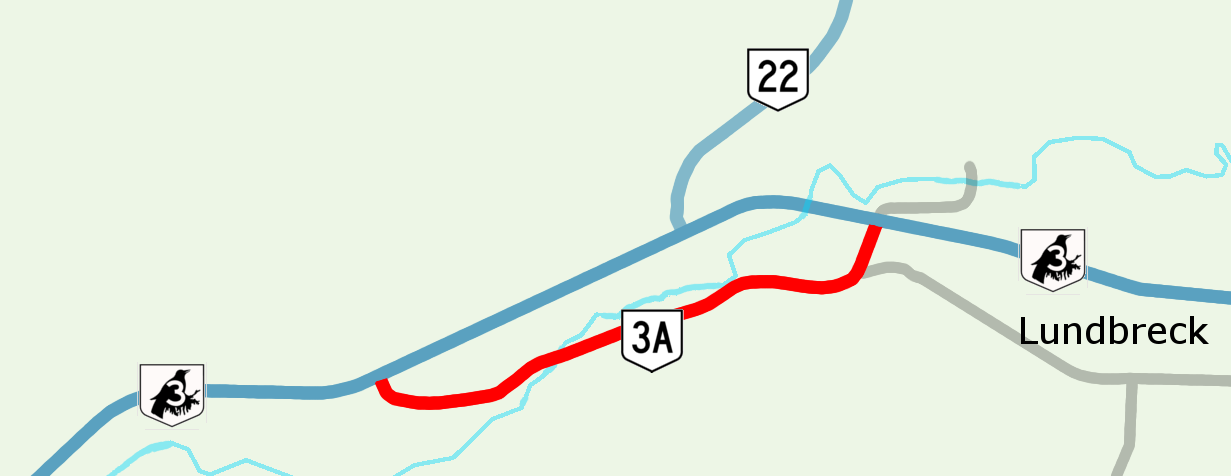
Highway 3A near Lundbreck

Highway 3A
- Location: M.D. Pincher Creek No. 9
- Length: 3.6 km (2.2 mi)
- Existed: 1967–present

From west to east, the first segment of Highway 3A begins west of the Highway 3 intersection with Highway 22, east of Burmis, and ends east of the same intersection with Highway 22, west of Lundbreck. This 3.6 km (2.2 mi) segment crosses the Crowsnest River and provides a viewing opportunity of Lundbreck Falls. The highway was formed in 1967 when Highway 3 was realigned across a new bridge over Crowsnest River.

Lundbreck Falls drops approximately 12 metres (39 ft) into a pool at the base of a limestone gorge; the Crowsnest River splits into twin channels around a small island at the crest before descending into the canyon below. The site is administered as a provincial recreation area by Alberta Parks. An observation platform at road level gives a direct view of the falls from above, and a short trail descends through the limestone gorge to the pool at the base. Interpretive signage in the canyon describes the geological history of the area and the fossil record preserved in the surrounding limestone formations. A campground adjacent to the recreation area operates through the summer and early autumn. Highway 3A crosses the Crowsnest River here on the bridge structure that served Highway 3 prior to the 1967 realignment; the old bridge was retained as part of the alternate designation when the new structure was opened.

The segment lies in the Municipal District of Pincher Creek No. 9, at the eastern edge of the Crowsnest Pass foothills where the highway descends from mountain terrain toward the open ranching country of southwestern Alberta. The nearest service centre is Pincher Creek, approximately 26 km (16 mi) to the east, a town that began as a North-West Mounted Police post in 1878 and grew into the main commercial centre for the surrounding ranching country. The Crowsnest River, which the segment crosses at the falls, drains the eastern slopes of the Crowsnest Pass region and flows eastward through the foothills. The Crowsnest Pass, 269 km (167 mi) southwest of Calgary, developed through the 1880s following the construction of a Canadian Pacific Railway branch line through the mountains, and coal extraction in the pass communities supplied both railway and commercial markets for most of the twentieth century.

== Monarch ==
Highway 3A
- Location: M.D. Willow Creek No. 26
- Length: 6.8 km (4.2 mi)
- Existed: 1996–present

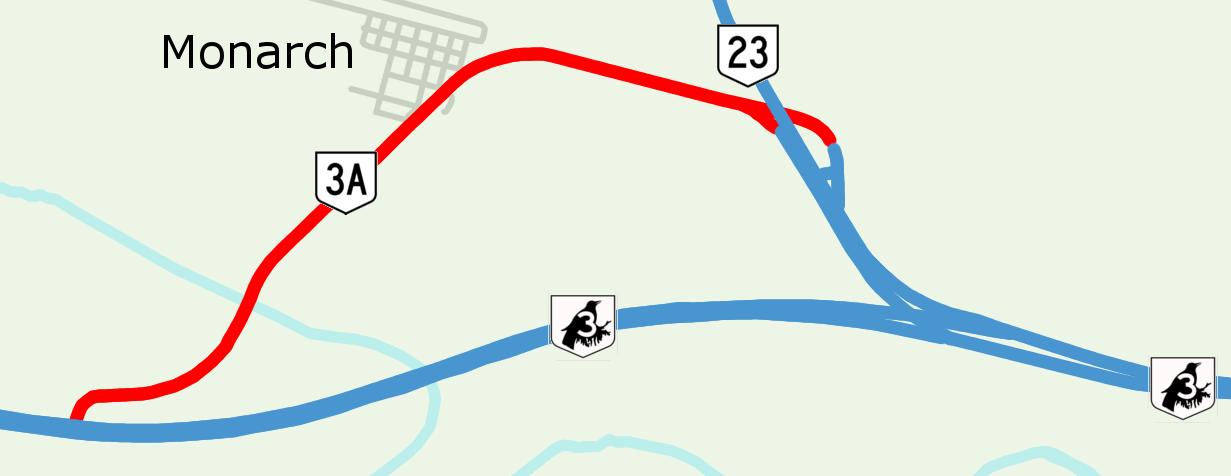
Highway 3A near Monarch

The second segment is 6.8 km (4.2 mi) in length, beginning 21 km (13 mi) east of Fort Macleod. Highway 3A splits to the north from Highway 3 and runs through the Hamlet of Monarch along the Canadian Pacific Railway tracks, before merging with Highway 23 and rejoining Highway 3 at a point 19 km (12 mi) west of Lethbridge. The highway was commissioned in 1996 when Highway 3 was twinned and realigned in the area.

Monarch is one of a number of small hamlets in the agricultural corridor between Fort Macleod and Lethbridge that developed as service points for surrounding grain and mixed farms in the early twentieth century. The Canadian Pacific Railway tracks run alongside the Highway 3A alignment through Monarch, as they do for many small communities established along CPR branch lines in this part of the province. The alternate route crosses the Oldman River near the western boundary of Lethbridge County; the river flows eastward through a broad agricultural valley before reaching Lethbridge. The 1996 twinning of Highway 3 in this area relocated the through-traffic corridor to a new alignment south of Monarch, leaving the route through Monarch as a provincially maintained alternate.

Highway 23, which joins the alternate route at an interchange in Monarch and concurrently follows Highway 3A east to the point where both rejoin Highway 3, connects northward through Lethbridge County toward Vulcan and the communities of central Alberta's Vulcan County.

=== Major intersections ===
Rural/specialized municipality	Location	km	mi	Destinations	Notes
M.D. of Willow Creek No. 26		0.0	0.0	Highway 3 – Lethbridge, Fort Macleod	
M.D. of Willow Creek No. 26–Lethbridge County boundary		1.5	0.93	Crosses Oldman River	
Lethbridge County	Monarch	5.5	3.4	Highway 23 north – Vulcan	Interchange; west end of Highway 23 concurrency
Lethbridge County	Monarch	6.8	4.2	Highway 3 east – Lethbridge	Partial interchange; westbound exit and eastbound entrance; east end of Highway 23 concurrency
1.000 mi = 1.609 km; 1.000 km = 0.621 mi: Concurrency terminus; Incomplete access

== Lethbridge ==
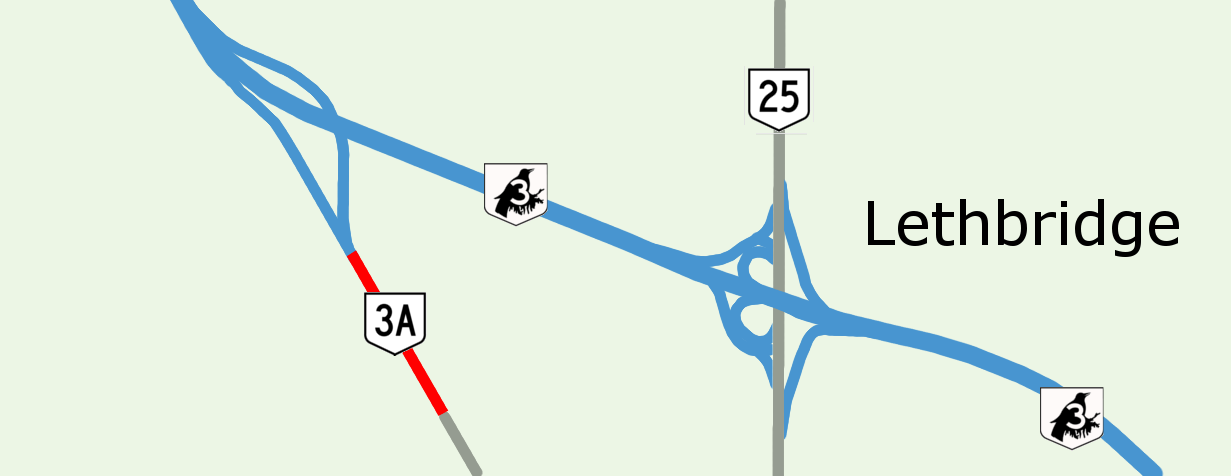
Highway 3A near Lethbridge

Highway 3A
- Location: Lethbridge County
- Length: 0.65 km (0.40 mi; 2,100 ft)
- Existed: 1966–present

The third segment of Highway 3A provides access to West Lethbridge. It diverges from Highway 3 southeast of Coalhurst, in the form of a Y interchange running for only 650 m (2,130 ft) in the Lethbridge County before ending at Lethbridge city limits and continuing as Westside Drive; essentially the area inside the provincially maintained interchange right-of-way, and is unsigned. It is a remnant of a larger 6 km (4 mi) route that followed present-day Westside Drive and Bridge Drive and was the original western approach to the Highway 3 bridge over the Oldman River; it was commissioned in 1966 when Highway 3 twinned and realigned. All but the extreme western portion of the route was decommissioned when the area was annexed by the City of Lethbridge in the mid-1980s.

West Lethbridge grew substantially as a residential district after University of Lethbridge relocated to a permanent campus on the west side of the Oldman River valley in 1971. The university's move prompted what the Canadian Encyclopedia described as "a westward shift in the orientation of the city," accompanied by a new road bridge over the Oldman River and the development of residential neighbourhoods on the plateau west of the valley. As the surrounding area was annexed by the City of Lethbridge during the mid-1980s, the former provincial alignment, which had served as the western road approach to the original Highway 3 bridge over the Oldman River, was absorbed into the municipal road network under the names Westside Drive and Bridge Drive. The 650 m (2,130 ft) stub that survives as Highway 3A represents the portion of the interchange area at the western junction with Highway 3 that lies within Lethbridge County, just outside the city boundary near Coalhurst.

The Oldman River, which the original 6-kilometre alignment bridged as its centrepiece, runs through a deeply incised valley that forms a prominent geographic boundary on Lethbridge's western edge; the valley bottom is occupied by a chain of parks extending from south to north through the city. The highway segment that preceded Highway 3A used a bridge over this valley to connect the approaching roadway from Coalhurst and the agricultural land to the west. After the 1966 twinning relocated the primary through-traffic alignment and a new bridge was constructed, the old approach road and its bridge became superfluous to highway traffic, and provincial designation was progressively withdrawn as annexation brought the land into Lethbridge city jurisdiction.

== Barnwell ==
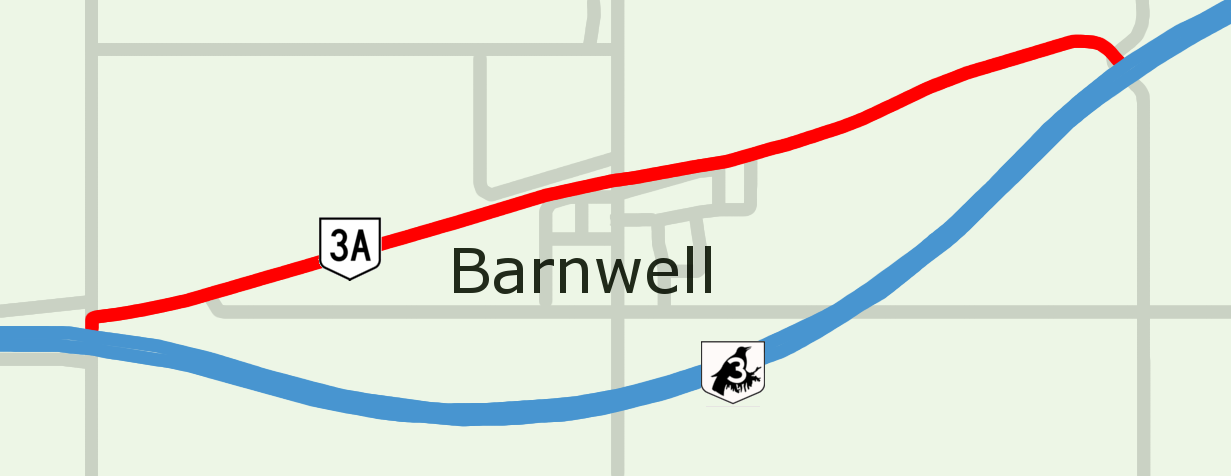
Highway 3A near Barnwell

Highway 3A
- Location: Taber M.D.
- Existed: 2000–present

The fourth and easternmost segment is also an original alignment of Highway 3, passing through the centre of Barnwell. The town was bypassed to the south in 2000 when twinning of Highway 3 was extended to Taber.

The community was first known as Woodpecker in the late nineteenth century, when a boxcar on a Canadian Pacific Railway siding served as a local telegraph office. It was renamed Bountiful in 1908 to align with the name of the surrounding school district, then renamed Barnwell when officials found another Alberta community already held the Bountiful name; the new name came from a family described as having "prairie roots and strong ties to the Canadian Pacific Railway". Barnwell is situated approximately 10 km west of Taber and 43 km east of Lethbridge, within the Municipal District of Taber.

The area around Barnwell lies within the irrigated agricultural zone of southeastern Alberta. Irrigation infrastructure in this part of the province expanded from the late nineteenth century onward through a series of canal systems built to support crop production in otherwise semi-arid terrain. Taber, the nearest town, is home to a sugar beet processing plant that has operated since 1950 and draws on production from farms in the surrounding district, including the Barnwell area. Taber also gained regional recognition for growing corn adapted to Alberta's shorter growing season, and oil and natural gas production has contributed to the local economy alongside agriculture.

The 2000 bypass moved most through traffic onto the new twinned corridor south of the village, substantially reducing volumes on the former alignment that now carries the Highway 3A designation. The village's Municipal Development Plan noted the change as one that "removed a significant amount of traffic from the Village."
