= Fairview, Alberta (hamlet) =

Fairview
- Hamlet
- Location of Fairview Fairview (Canada)
- Coordinates: 49°41′46″N 112°46′33″W
- Country: Canada
- Province: Alberta
- Region: Southern Alberta
- Census division: 2
- Municipal district: Lethbridge County

Government
  - Type: Unincorporated
  - Governing body: Lethbridge County Council

Area (2021)
  - Land: 0.16 km^{2} (0.062 sq mi)

Population (2021)
  - Total: 165
  - Density: 1,034.5/km^{2} (2,679/sq mi)
- Time zone: UTC−06:00 (Alberta Time)
- Area codes: 403, 587, 825

Fairview is a hamlet in southern Alberta, Canada within Lethbridge County. It is adjacent to the eastern boundary of Lethbridge, approximately 0.3 kilometres (0.19 mi) south of Highway 3. More specifically, it is located on southeast corner of Highway 4 (43A Street South) and Highway 512 (1 Avenue South).

The Hamlet of Fairview is one of two different communities in Alberta that go by the name of Fairview. The Town of Fairview in northern Alberta is the more widely known of the two.

== Demographics ==
In the 2021 Census of Population conducted by Statistics Canada, Fairview had a population of 165 living in 77 of its 82 total private dwellings, a change of 7.1% from its 2016 population of 154. With a land area of 0.16 km^{2} (0.062 sq mi), it had a population density of 1,031.3/km^{2} (2,670.9/sq mi) in 2021.

As a designated place in the 2016 Census of Population conducted by Statistics Canada, Fairview had a population of 154 living in 70 of its 81 total private dwellings, a change of −4.9% from its 2011 population of 162. With a land area of 0.16 km^{2} (0.062 sq mi), it had a population density of 962.5/km^{2} (2,492.9/sq mi) in 2016.

== See also ==
- List of communities in Alberta
- List of hamlets in Alberta
