= Diamond City, Alberta =

Diamond City
- Hamlet
- Location of Diamond City Diamond City (Canada)
- Coordinates: 49.798°N 112.846°W
- Country: Canada
- Province: Alberta
- Region: Southern Alberta
- Census division: 2
- Municipal district: Lethbridge County

Government
  - Type: Unincorporated
  - Governing body: Lethbridge County Council

Area (2021)
  - Land: 0.51 km^{2} (0.20 sq mi)

Population (2021)
  - Total: 204
  - Density: 398/km^{2} (1,030/sq mi)
- Time zone: UTC−06:00 (Alberta Time)
- Area codes: 403, 587, 825

Diamond City is a hamlet in southern Alberta, Canada within the Lethbridge County. It is located on Highway 25, approximately 13 kilometres (8.1 mi) north of Lethbridge. The community was so named on account of deposits of coal near the original town site, a resource also called "black diamond".

Diamond City was first settled at the turn of the 20th century by farmers, ranchers and miners. The community grew rapidly when a coal mine was opened in 1905. Previously an incorporated town, Diamond City dissolved on June 30, 1937.

== Demographics ==
Historical population
Year	Pop.	±%
1926	250	—
1936	143	−42.8%
2011	162	+13.3%
2016	184	+13.6%
2021	204	+10.9%

In the 2021 Census of Population conducted by Statistics Canada, Diamond City had a population of 204 living in 64 of its 68 total private dwellings, a change of 10.9% from its 2016 population of 184. With a land area of 0.51 km^{2} (0.20 sq mi), it had a population density of 400.0/km^{2} (1,036.0/sq mi) in 2021.

As a designated place in the 2016 Census of Population conducted by Statistics Canada, Diamond City had a population of 184 living in 62 of its 64 total private dwellings, a change of 13.6% from its 2011 population of 162. With a land area of 0.54 km^{2} (0.21 sq mi), it had a population density of 340.7/km^{2} (882.5/sq mi) in 2016.

== See also ==
- List of communities in Alberta
- List of designated places in Alberta
- List of former urban municipalities in Alberta
- List of hamlets in Alberta
