= Shaughnessy, Alberta =

Shaughnessy
- Hamlet
- Location of Shaughnessy Shaughnessy (Canada)
- Coordinates: 49°51′10″N 112°50′32″W
- Country: Canada
- Province: Alberta
- Region: Southern Alberta
- Census division: 2
- Municipal district: Lethbridge County

Government
  - Type: Unincorporated
  - Governing body: Lethbridge County Council

Area (2021)
  - Land: 0.38 km^{2} (0.15 sq mi)

Population (2021)
  - Total: 388
  - Density: 1,021.6/km^{2} (2,646/sq mi)
- Time zone: UTC−06:00 (Alberta Time)
- Area codes: 403, 587, 825

Shaughnessy is a hamlet in southern Alberta, Canada within the Lethbridge County. It is located on Highway 25, approximately 17 kilometres (11 mi) north of Lethbridge. It is named after Baron Shaughnessy, chairman of the mining company that ran the town.

== Demographics ==
Population history of Shaughnessy
Year	Pop.	±%
1941	290	—
1951	463	+59.7%
1956	353	−23.8%
1961	324	−8.2%
1966	287	−11.4%
1971	323	+12.5%
1976	299	−7.4%
1981	270	−9.7%
1986	296	+9.6%
1991	321	+8.4%
1991A	322	+0.3%
1996	360	+11.8%
2001	390	+8.3%
2006	401	+2.8%
2011	384	−4.2%
2016	415	+8.1%
2021	388	−6.5%
Source: Statistics Canada

In the 2021 Census of Population conducted by Statistics Canada, Shaughnessy had a population of 388 living in 150 of its 162 total private dwellings, a change of −6.5% from its 2016 population of 415. With a land area of 0.38 km^{2} (0.15 sq mi), it had a population density of 1,021.1/km^{2} (2,644.5/sq mi) in 2021.

As a designated place in the 2016 Census of Population conducted by Statistics Canada, Shaughnessy had a population of 415 living in 160 of its 167 total private dwellings, a change of 8.1% from its 2011 population of 384. With a land area of 0.38 km^{2} (0.15 sq mi), it had a population density of 1,092.1/km^{2} (2,828.5/sq mi) in 2016.

== See also ==
- List of communities in Alberta
- List of designated places in Alberta
- List of hamlets in Alberta
