= Charles Sherwood Noble =

Canadian inventor

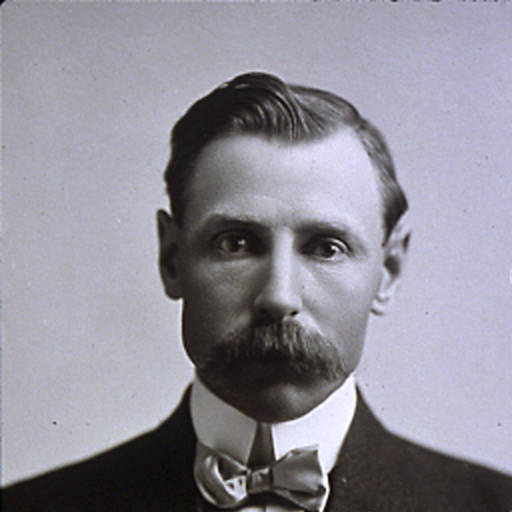
Charles Sherwood Noble in 1918

Charles Sherwood Noble (1873 – July 5, 1957) invented a minimum disturbance cultivator called the Noble blade. The Noble blade (or Noble plow) cuts weed roots beneath the soil surface without turning the soil over, thus reducing topsoil loss due to wind erosion. The village of Nobleford, Alberta is named after him.

== Early life ==
Noble was born in State Center, Iowa, the eldest of six boys. His mother died when he was very young and Noble left school when he was age 15 to assist his father in supporting the family. In 1896 Noble took out a 160-acre (0.65 km^{2}) homestead near Knox, North Dakota.

In 1902 Noble moved to the Claresholm, Alberta area in what was then part of the Northwest Territories. The next year, he married Margaret Naomi Fraser. In the following years Noble purchased large tracts of land southeast of Claresholm. He constructed many of the area's first buildings and the hamlet of Noble (later renamed Nobleford) was established in 1909.

By 1922 Noble had accumulated about 30,000 acres (120 km^{2}) of land but a series of poor crops, falling prices and too much debt meant he was unable to keep up the payments on the land. In the autumn of that year the Spokane Trust Company to whom he owed $600,000 foreclosed on the Noble estate and he lost all his holdings.

By 1930 he had regained some of his holdings and was farming approximately 8,000 acres (32 km^{2}) of land.

== Noble blade ==
The land that Charles Noble farmed in southern Alberta sits in what is known as the dry-belt. During the period of drought known as the dirty thirties, farmland within the dry-belt, cultivated with mold-board plow and/or double disc and summer fallowed every other year, was subject to massive soil erosion. In 1935, while on a visit to California, Noble observed a sugar beet farmer using a straight blade tool to cut into the subsoil beneath the beets to loosen them for harvesting. He noticed that the blade was disturbing and killing weeds without burying them. Noble realized if he could apply a similar implement to the dry land back in Alberta thus leaving the crop stubble as "trash" on top to hold the soil and protect it from blowing the problem of soil erosion may be solved. He immediately fabricated a tillage implement patterned after the sugar beet harvesting tool. He called his invention the Noble blade. The next year he carried out all his summer fallow work using his invention. The results were so successful by 1937 he had fabricated 50 of the implements which he sold to friends and neighbors. By 1941 a factory was built within the village of Nobleford. Sales of the Noble blade occurred throughout the dry land farming areas of the world. The Noble blade is touted as one of the most important agricultural inventions of the 20th century. In 1982 the company that Noble had founded was sold to Versatile Manufacturing Ltd.
