= Turin, Alberta =

Turin
- Hamlet
- Location of Turin in Alberta
- Coordinates: 49°57′55″N 112°31′35″W
- Country: Canada
- Province: Alberta
- Region: Southern Alberta
- Census division: 2
- Municipal district: Lethbridge County

Government
  - Governing body: Lethbridge County Council

Area (2021)
  - Land: 0.28 km^{2} (0.11 sq mi)

Population (2021)
  - Total: 72
  - Density: 258.9/km^{2} (671/sq mi)
- Time zone: UTC−06:00 (Alberta Time)
- Postal code span: T0K 2H0
- Area code: +1-403
- Highways: Highway 25

Turin is a hamlet in Alberta, Canada within the Lethbridge County. It is approximately 56 kilometres (35 mi) northeast of Lethbridge on Highway 25 and along a Canadian Pacific Kansas City line.

Sharing its name with Turin, Italy, an Olympic flag was erected in the hamlet to coincide with the 2006 Winter Olympics. It was founded in 1908 and named after the first settler's horse.

== Demographics ==
Population history of Turin
Year	Pop.	±%
1951	131	—
1956	113	−13.7%
1961	99	−12.4%
1966	106	+7.1%
1971	102	−3.8%
1976	99	−2.9%
1981	92	−7.1%
1986	84	−8.7%
1991	91	+8.3%
1996	101	+11.0%
2001	123	+21.8%
2006	103	−16.3%
2011	106	+2.9%
2016	119	+12.3%
2021	72	−39.5%
Source: Statistics Canada

In the 2021 Census of Population conducted by Statistics Canada, Turin had a population of 72 living in 28 of its 34 total private dwellings, a change of −39.5% from its 2016 population of 119. With a land area of 0.28 km^{2} (0.11 sq mi), it had a population density of 257.1/km^{2} (666.0/sq mi) in 2021.

As a designated place in the 2016 Census of Population conducted by Statistics Canada, Turin had a population of 119 living in 37 of its 41 total private dwellings, a change of 12.3% from its 2011 population of 106. With a land area of 0.28 km^{2} (0.11 sq mi), it had a population density of 425.0/km^{2} (1,100.7/sq mi) in 2016.

== See also ==
- List of communities in Alberta
- List of designated places in Alberta
- List of hamlets in Alberta
