= Barons, Alberta =

Barons
- Village
- Village of Barons
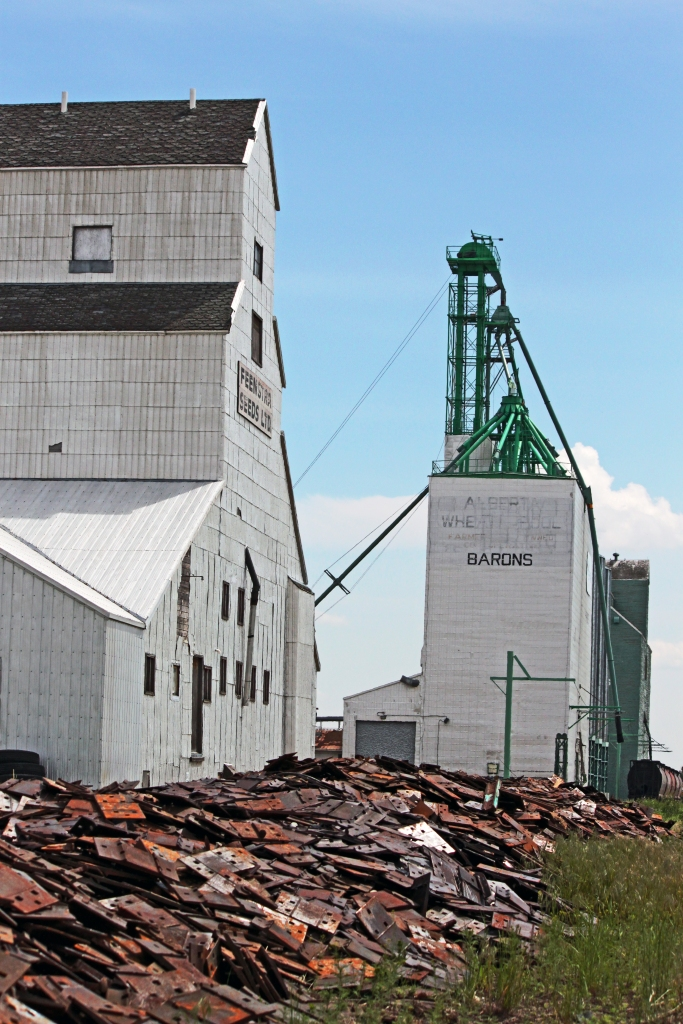
- Barons' last remaining elevators along the CPR tracks prior to demolition
- Motto: Wheat Heart of the West
- Location within Alberta
- Coordinates: 49°59′59″N 113°04′58″W
- Country: Canada
- Province: Alberta
- Region: Southern Alberta
- Census division: 2
- Municipal district: Lethbridge County
- Incorporated
  - Village: May 6, 1910

Government
  - Mayor: Clinton Bishop
  - Governing body: Barons Village Council

Area (2021)
  - Land: 0.81 km^{2} (0.31 sq mi)
- Elevation: 965 m (3,166 ft)

Population (2021)
  - Total: 313
  - Density: 387.8/km^{2} (1,004/sq mi)
- Time zone: UTC−06:00 (Alberta Time)
- Postal code span: T0L 0G0
- Highways: Highway 23; Highway 520
- Website: Official website

Barons is a village in southern Alberta, Canada in a region referred to as Palliser's Triangle. It is located 51 kilometres (32 mi) north of Lethbridge along Highway 23. Barons was a filming location for a scene in the 1978 film Superman; the village's school was used to represent the school that young Clark Kent (the future Superman) attended.

== History ==
The Canadian Pacific Railway purchased the present townsite of Barons in early 1909. Charles S. Noble, an agent for the CPR sold lots to settlers. The train station was originally named "Baron", but public usage eventually evolved to "Barons".

Barons became a village on May 6, 1910, and early buildings included a hardware store, a grocery store, lumber yards, a bank, a feedmill, a dance hall, an opera house and a hotel.

The Village of Barons was subject to a study in 2004 that investigated dissolution of the village to hamlet status under the jurisdiction of the County of Lethbridge.

The last two grain elevators were demolished in the summer of 2012.

== Demographics ==
Historical population
Year	Pop.	±%
1916 (est.)	230	—
1921 (est.)	500	+117.4%
1926 (est.)	350	−30.0%
1931 (est.)	300	−14.3%
1936	262	−12.7%
1941	231	−11.8%
1946	270	+16.9%
1951	360	+33.3%
1971	254	−29.4%
1976	283	+11.4%
1981	285	+0.7%
1991	262	−8.1%
1996	285	+8.8%
2001	284	−0.4%
2006	276	−2.8%
2011	315	+14.1%
2016	341	+8.3%
2021	313	−8.2%
Sources: [

In the 2021 Census of Population conducted by Statistics Canada, the Village of Barons had a population of 313 living in 127 of its 148 total private dwellings, a change of −8.2% from its 2016 population of 341. With a land area of 0.81 km^{2} (0.31 sq mi), it had a population density of 386.4/km^{2} (1,000.8/sq mi) in 2021.

In the 2016 Census of Population conducted by Statistics Canada, the Village of Barons recorded a population of 341 living in 132 of its 148 total private dwellings, a change of 8.3% from its 2011 population of 315. With a land area of 0.81 km^{2} (0.31 sq mi), it had a population density of 421.0/km^{2} (1,090.4/sq mi) in 2016.

== Government ==
The village is governed by a council comprising a mayor and two councillors.

== Infrastructure ==
Barons' wastewater drains to a sewage lagoon 0.5 km (0.3 mi) west of the village.

Water is supplied via a 16 km (9.9 mi) regional pipeline between Barons and the Village of Nobleford. The pipeline is a joint venture between Nobleford, Barons and the County of Lethbridge (NBC) in partnership with the province of Alberta through its "Water for Life" program.

== Services ==
High speed wireless Internet access is available from multiple providers.

== See also ==
- List of communities in Alberta
- List of villages in Alberta
