= Monarch, Alberta =

Monarch
- Hamlet
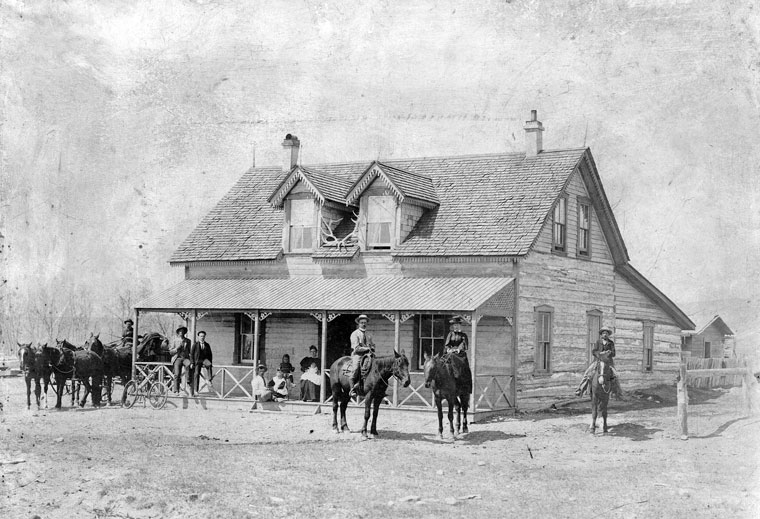
- Urch Family and friends posed in front of the Urch Ranch Home (also known as the Half-Way House) near Monarch

- Location of Monarch Monarch (Canada)
- Coordinates: 49°48′16″N 113°06′28″W
- Country: Canada
- Province: Alberta
- Region: Southern Alberta
- Census division: 2
- Municipal district: Lethbridge County

Government
  - Type: Unincorporated
  - Governing body: Lethbridge County Council

Area (2021)
  - Land: 0.39 km^{2} (0.15 sq mi)

Population (2021)
  - Total: 217
  - Density: 559.1/km^{2} (1,448/sq mi)
- Time zone: UTC−06:00 (Alberta Time)
- Area codes: 403, 587, 825

Monarch is a hamlet in southern Alberta, Canada within the Lethbridge County. It is located on Highway 3A, approximately 23 kilometres (14 mi) northwest of Lethbridge. It was formerly a village, existing as such from about 1913 to about 1939.

== Climate ==
Monarch has a semi-arid climate (Köppen climate classification BSk) with an average maximum temperature of 12.2 °C (54.0 °F) and an average minimum temperature of −1.7 °C (28.9 °F).

Climate data for Monarch (1981-2010)
Month	Jan	Feb	Mar	Apr	May	Jun	Jul	Aug	Sep	Oct	Nov	Dec	Year
Record high °C (°F)	16.0 (60.8)	22.5 (72.5)	27.0 (80.6)	30.0 (86.0)	33.0 (91.4)	33.5 (92.3)	35.5 (95.9)	35.5 (95.9)	35.5 (95.9)	30.0 (86.0)	23.0 (73.4)	15.5 (59.9)	35.5 (95.9)
Mean daily maximum °C (°F)	−0.7 (30.7)	1.9 (35.4)	6.2 (43.2)	12.9 (55.2)	18.2 (64.8)	21.6 (70.9)	25.3 (77.5)	24.8 (76.6)	19.1 (66.4)	13.1 (55.6)	4.3 (39.7)	0.0 (32.0)	12.2 (54.0)
Daily mean °C (°F)	−6.8 (19.8)	−4.5 (23.9)	−0.4 (31.3)	5.7 (42.3)	10.7 (51.3)	14.6 (58.3)	17.4 (63.3)	16.7 (62.1)	11.6 (52.9)	6.2 (43.2)	−1.6 (29.1)	−6.0 (21.2)	5.3 (41.5)
Mean daily minimum °C (°F)	−12.9 (8.8)	−10.9 (12.4)	−6.9 (19.6)	−1.6 (29.1)	3.1 (37.6)	7.5 (45.5)	9.5 (49.1)	8.5 (47.3)	4.0 (39.2)	−0.8 (30.6)	−7.5 (18.5)	−11.9 (10.6)	−1.7 (28.9)
Record low °C (°F)	−41.0 (−41.8)	−40.0 (−40.0)	−37.0 (−34.6)	−20.5 (−4.9)	−9.0 (15.8)	−2.5 (27.5)	0.0 (32.0)	−3.5 (25.7)	−9.0 (15.8)	−29.0 (−20.2)	−37.5 (−35.5)	−41.0 (−41.8)	−41.0 (−41.8)
Average precipitation mm (inches)	17.6 (0.69)	15.9 (0.63)	27.5 (1.08)	30.7 (1.21)	52.2 (2.06)	85.9 (3.38)	33.5 (1.32)	42.9 (1.69)	39.2 (1.54)	19.7 (0.78)	18.0 (0.71)	16.8 (0.66)	399.7 (15.74)
Source: Environment Canada

== Demographics ==
In the 2021 Census of Population conducted by Statistics Canada, Monarch had a population of 217 living in 88 of its 98 total private dwellings, a change of −4.4% from its 2016 population of 227. With a land area of 0.39 km^{2} (0.15 sq mi), it had a population density of 556.4/km^{2} (1,441.1/sq mi) in 2021.

As a designated place in the 2016 Census of Population conducted by Statistics Canada, Monarch had a population of 227 living in 90 of its 98 total private dwellings, a change of 3.2% from its 2011 population of 220. With a land area of 0.39 km^{2} (0.15 sq mi), it had a population density of 582.1/km^{2} (1,507.5/sq mi) in 2016.

== See also ==
- List of communities in Alberta
- List of designated places in Alberta
- List of former urban municipalities in Alberta
- List of hamlets in Alberta
