= Brant, Alberta =

Brant
- Hamlet
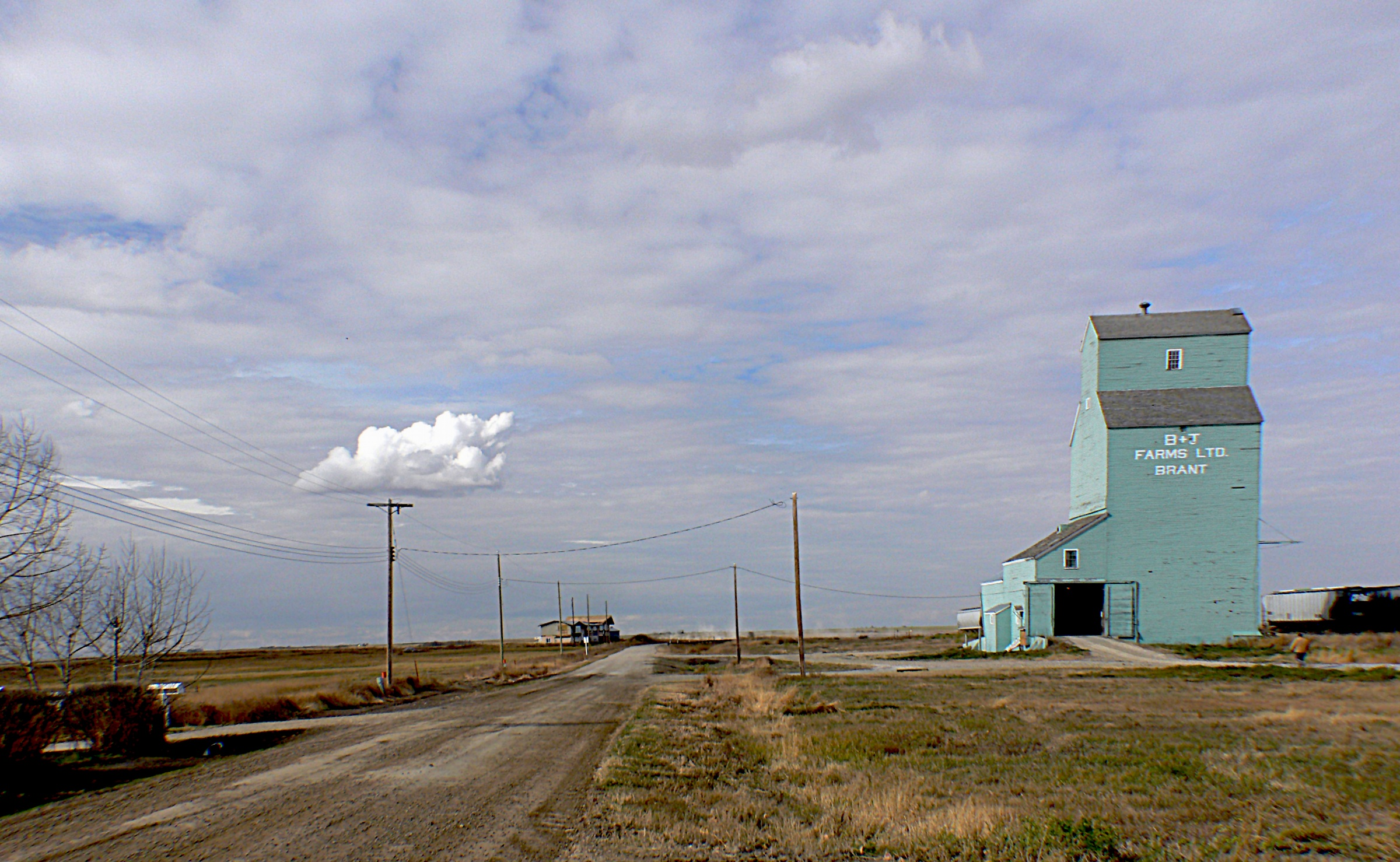

- Location of Brant
- Coordinates: 50°31′01″N 113°30′42″W
- Country: Canada
- Province: Alberta
- Region: Southern Alberta
- Census division: 5
- Municipal district: Vulcan County

Government
  - Type: Unincorporated
  - Governing body: Vulcan County Council

Population (2007)
  - Total: 78
- Time zone: UTC−06:00 (Alberta Time)
- Area codes: 403, 587, 825

Brant is a hamlet in southern Alberta, Canada within Vulcan County. It is located 6 kilometres (3.7 mi) south of Highway 23, approximately 71 kilometres (44 mi) southeast of Calgary. It is named after the number of Brant in the area. Brant is home to a grain elevator and a Christian School.

== Demographics ==
The population of Brant according to the 2007 municipal census conducted by Vulcan County is 78.

Population history of Brant

Year	Pop.	±%
1941	97	—
1951	87	−10.3%
1956	58	−33.3%
1961	76	+31.0%
1966	51	−32.9%

Year	Pop.	±%
1971	48	−5.9%
1976	37	−22.9%
1981	54	+45.9%
1986	45	−16.7%
1991	46	+2.2%

Source: Statistics Canada

== See also ==
- List of communities in Alberta
- List of hamlets in Alberta
