= Feedlot Alley =

Feedlot Alley is a nickname given to a 500 km^{2} area northwest of Lethbridge, Alberta, Canada known for its intensive livestock operations. The area is home to over 2,300,000 cattle and 180,000 hogs. Lethbridge County reported 543,566 cattle and calves and 73,161 pigs on census day 2016. Feedlot Alley, located in south central Alberta, is also known for producing 60% of all Canadian beef.

== Criticism ==
In 1998, Chinook Health, the health authority that oversees the region that includes Feedlot Alley, reported one of the highest rates of gastrointestinal illnesses in the province, with rates 1.5 times the provincial average.

Intensive livestock operations such as those in this area pose a potential threat to the water supply because of runoff. While most waste from the operations is used to fertilise crops in the area, smaller farms cannot absorb all nutrients from the manure risking excess waste being washed into the water supply.
