= Enchant, Alberta =

Enchant
- Hamlet
- Location of Enchant in Alberta
- Coordinates: 50.1700°N 112.4225°W
- Country: Canada
- Province: Alberta
- Census division: No. 2
- Municipal district: Municipal District of Taber

Government
  - Type: Unincorporated
  - Governing body: Municipal District of Taber Council
- Elevation: 810 m (2,660 ft)

Population (2021)
  - Total: 306
- Time zone: UTC−06:00 (Alberta Time)

Enchant is a hamlet in southern Alberta, Canada within the Municipal District of Taber. It is on Highway 526 and the Canadian Pacific Kansas City railway, between Vauxhall and Lomond. It has an elevation of 810 metres (2,660 ft).

The hamlet is located in census division No. 2 and in the federal riding of Medicine Hat.

== History ==
Enchant was once incorporated as a village but was dissolved from village status on February 1, 1945. The railroad arrived in 1914 and the first grain elevator was completed in 1915. Enchant was the site of the 1917 founding of the Evangelical Free Church of Canada.

== Demographics ==
In the 2021 Census of Population conducted by Statistics Canada, Enchant had a total population of 306 within its 87 total private dwellings among its 14 dissemination blocks. This is up 13.3% from a total population of 270 within its 92 total private dwellings among the same dissemination blocks in the 2016 Census of Population.

The Municipal District of Taber's 2016 municipal census counted a population of 259 in Enchant, a −10.4% change from the hamlet's 2013 municipal census population of 289.

== See also ==
- List of communities in Alberta
- List of former urban municipalities in Alberta
- List of hamlets in Alberta
