= Carmangay =

Municipality in Alberta, Canada (est. 1910)

- Village
- Village of Carmangay
- Location of Carmangay in Alberta Carmangay (Canada)
- Coordinates: 50°07′46″N 113°06′41″W
- Country: Canada
- Province: Alberta
- Region: Southern Alberta
- Census division: 5
- Municipal district: Vulcan County
- Incorporated
  - Village: January 20, 1910
  - Town: March 17, 1911
  - Village: March 4, 1936

Government
  - Mayor: Stacy Hovde
  - Governing body: Carmangay Village Council

Area (2021)
  - Land: 1.8 km^{2} (0.69 sq mi)
- Elevation: 935 m (3,068 ft)

Population (2021)
  - Total: 269
  - Density: 149.6/km^{2} (387/sq mi)
- Time zone: UTC−06:00 (Alberta Time)
- Forward sortation area: T0L 0N0
- Area codes: 403, 587, 825
- Highway: Highway 23
- Waterway: Little Bow River
- Website: Official website

Carmangay (/ˈkɑːrmənɡeɪ/ KAR-mən-gay) is a village in southern Alberta, Canada. It is located 62 kilometres (39 mi) north of Lethbridge and 150 kilometres (93 mi) south of Calgary, along the Canadian Pacific Kansas City railway, east of Highway 23. It takes its name from C.W. Carman, who bought 1,500 acres (6.1 km^{2}) at $3.50 per acre to grow wheat in 1904, and his wife, Gertrude Gay.

== History ==
Carmangay is the site of the Carmangay Tipi Rings, an archeological tipi ring site. The site does not have much archaeological material, though there has been enough to date it to 200–1700 AD.

== Demographics ==
In the 2021 Census of Population conducted by Statistics Canada, the Village of Carmangay had a population of 269 living in 127 of its 147 total private dwellings, a change of 11.2% from its 2016 population of 242. With a land area of 1.8 km^{2} (0.69 sq mi), it had a population density of 149.4/km^{2} (387.1/sq mi) in 2021.

The population of the Village Carmangay of according to its 2017 municipal census is 250, a change of −4.6% from its 2013 municipal census population of 262.

In the 2016 Census of Population conducted by Statistics Canada, the Village of Carmangay recorded a population of 242 living in 121 of its 135 total private dwellings, a −34.1% change from its 2011 population of 367. With a land area of 1.86 km^{2} (0.72 sq mi), it had a population density of 130.1/km^{2} (337.0/sq mi) in 2016.

== Wind farm ==
In 2013, Enbridge and EDF began construction on a 300 MW wind farm east of the Village of Carmangay. 166 wind turbines were constructed at the site, with over 300 workers on the project. The Blackspring Ridge Wind Project was completed in May 2014.

== See also ==
- List of communities in Alberta
- List of villages in Alberta
