= Iron Springs, Alberta =

Iron Springs
- Hamlet
- Location of Iron Springs Iron Springs (Canada)
- Coordinates: 49°55′48″N 112°41′15″W
- Country: Canada
- Province: Alberta
- Region: Southern Alberta
- Census division: 2
- Municipal district: Lethbridge County

Government
  - Type: Unincorporated
  - Governing body: Lethbridge County Council

Area (2021)
  - Land: 0.26 km^{2} (0.10 sq mi)

Population (2021)
  - Total: 84
  - Density: 325.7/km^{2} (844/sq mi)
- Time zone: UTC−06:00 (Alberta Time)
- Area codes: 403, 587, 825

Iron Springs is a hamlet in southern Alberta, Canada within the Lethbridge County. It is located on Highway 25, approximately 28 kilometres (17 mi) northeast of Lethbridge. It was founded in 1925 when the railroad arrived. The community was named after a spring of the same name near the original town site.

== Demographics ==
Population history of Iron Springs
Year	Pop.	±%
1941	35	—
1951	69	+97.1%
1956	58	−15.9%
1961	64	+10.3%
1966	48	−25.0%
1971	59	+22.9%
1976	56	−5.1%
1981	65	+16.1%
1986	67	+3.1%
1991	86	+28.4%
1991A	87	+1.2%
1996	57	−34.5%
2001	71	+24.6%
2006	72	+1.4%
2011	93	+29.2%
2016	97	+4.3%
2021	84	−13.4%
Source: Statistics Canada

In the 2021 Census of Population conducted by Statistics Canada, Iron Springs had a population of 84 living in 24 of its 26 total private dwellings, a change of −13.4% from its 2016 population of 97. With a land area of 0.26 km^{2} (0.10 sq mi), it had a population density of 323.1/km^{2} (836.8/sq mi) in 2021.

As a designated place in the 2016 Census of Population conducted by Statistics Canada, Iron Springs had a population of 97 living in 25 of its 26 total private dwellings, a change of 4.3% from its 2011 population of 93. With a land area of 0.26 km^{2} (0.10 sq mi), it had a population density of 373.1/km^{2} (966.3/sq mi) in 2016.

== See also ==
- List of communities in Alberta
- List of designated places in Alberta
- List of hamlets in Alberta
