= Coalhurst =

Municipality in Alberta, Canada (est. 1913)

- Town
- Town of Coalhurst
- Location in Lethbridge County Location in Alberta
- Coordinates: 49.7457°N 112.9319°W
- Country: Canada
- Province: Alberta
- Region: Southern Alberta
- Census division: 2
- Municipal district: Lethbridge County
- Incorporated
  - Village: December 17, 1913
  - Dissolution: December 31, 1936
  - Village: January 15, 1979
  - Town: June 1, 1995

Government
  - Mayor: Deb Florence
  - Town Council: Lori Harasem, Jesse Potrie, Brody Prete, Colin Slingsby

Area (2021)
  - Land: 3.08 km^{2} (1.19 sq mi)

Population (2021)
  - Total: 2,869
  - Density: 931.3/km^{2} (2,412/sq mi)
- Time zone: UTC−06:00 (Alberta Time)
- Postal code: T0L 0V0
- Highways: Highway 3 Highway 25
- Website: Official website

Coalhurst (originally named Bridgend) is a town in southern Alberta, Canada. It is located on Highway 3, 15 km (9.3 mi) northwest of Lethbridge. It used to be a coal-mining community.

Around 1930, a large fire broke out in Coalhurst and cost the town about $35,000. No one was injured in the fire.

== Demographics ==
Historical population
Year	Pop.	±%
1926 (est.)	1,000	—
1931 (est.)	1,200	+20.0%
1936	774	−35.5%
1981	881	+13.8%
1991	1,322	+50.1%
1996	1,439	+8.9%
2001	1,476	+2.6%
2006	1,523	+3.2%
2011	1,978	+29.9%
2016	2,668	+34.9%
2011 number revised from original tabulation. Sources:

In the 2021 Census of Population conducted by Statistics Canada, the Town of Coalhurst had a population of 2,869 living in 1,025 of its 1,055 total private dwellings, a change of 7.5% from its 2016 population of 2,668. With a land area of 3.08 km^{2} (1.19 sq mi), it had a population density of 931.5/km^{2} (2,412.6/sq mi) in 2021.

The population of the Town of Coalhurst according to its 2019 municipal census is 2,784, a change of 0.6% from its 2018 municipal census population of 2,767.

In the 2016 Census of Population conducted by Statistics Canada, the Town of Coalhurst recorded a population of 2,668 living in 938 of its 970 total private dwellings, a 34.9% change from its 2011 population of 1,978. With a land area of 3.11 km^{2} (1.20 sq mi), it had a population density of 857.9/km^{2} (2,221.9/sq mi) in 2016.

== See also ==
- List of communities in Alberta
- List of towns in Alberta
