= Vulcan, Alberta =

Vulcan
- Town
- Town of Vulcan
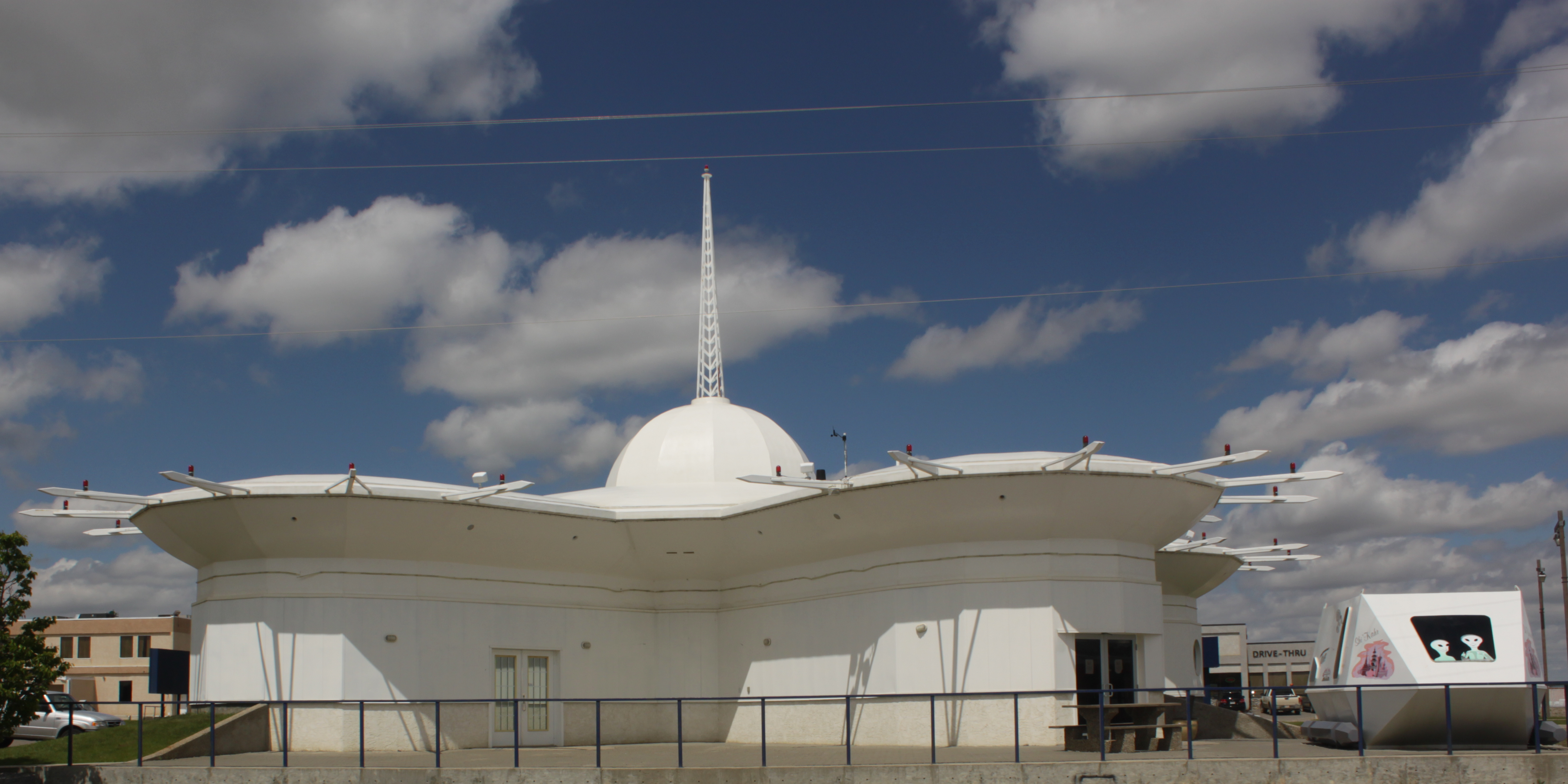

- Location of Vulcan Vulcan (Canada)
- Coordinates: 50°24′24″N 113°15′18″W
- Country: Canada
- Province: Alberta
- Region: Southern Alberta
- Census division: 5
- Municipal district: Vulcan County
- Incorporated
  - Village: December 23, 1912
  - Town: June 15, 1921

Government
  - Mayor: Tom Grant
  - Governing body: Vulcan Town Council
  - MP: John Barlow (Foothills-Cons)
  - MLA: Dave Schneider (Little Bow-UCP)

Area (2021)
  - Land: 6.28 km^{2} (2.42 sq mi)
- Elevation: 1,049 m (3,442 ft)

Population (2021)
  - Total: 1,769
  - Density: 281.8/km^{2} (730/sq mi)
- Time zone: UTC−06:00 (Alberta Time)
- Postal code span: T0L 2B0
- Area codes: +1-403, +1-587
- Highways: Highway 23; Highway 534
- Railways: Canadian Pacific Kansas City
- Website: www.townofvulcan.ca

Vulcan is a town in southern Alberta, Canada that is surrounded by Vulcan County. It is on Highway 23, midway between the cities of Calgary and Lethbridge. The population of the town was 1,769 in 2021. Now known as the "Official Star Trek Capital of Canada", Vulcan has a tourism building made to look like a landed space station, a statue of the original series' USS Enterprise, and other Star Trek themed attractions.

== History ==
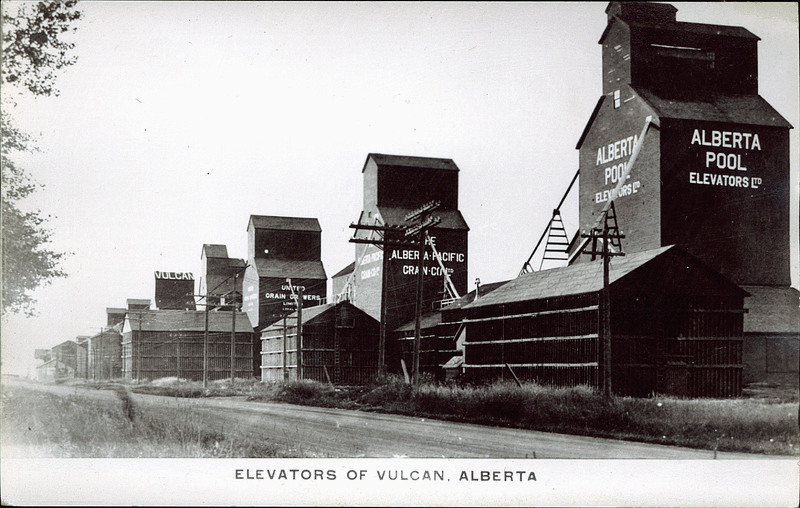
View of the row of grain elevators in Vulcan, Alberta. After 1920.

Vulcan was named by a surveyor for the Canadian Pacific Railway after the Roman God of Fire – Vulcan.

The community was incorporated as a village on December 23, 1912, and then as a town on June 15, 1921. In July 1927, a major tornado destroyed many homes and the new curling rink in the town. That tornado was made famous when a photograph of it approaching Vulcan was used for the "tornado" article in Encyclopædia Britannica.

The first newspaper to serve the area was The Vulcan Review, which began in 1912 and was published for one year. The Vulcan Review was followed by the Vulcan Advocate in 1913, which is still being published digitally today as member of Sun Media Community Newspapers part of Postmedia Network.

Vulcan elevator row in the 1960s

Due to the changing economics of the agricultural industry, the original elevators were taken down one by one. The last elevator was demolished on April 27, 2025.

A British Commonwealth Air Training Plan air force base, RCAF Station Vulcan, was located 5.7 nautical miles (10.6 km; 6.6 mi) southwest of the town during the Second World War. Many of the old hangars still exist and the runways can still be seen. It is now operated as Vulcan/Kirkcaldy Aerodrome and some of the old runways are still in use, though the base and its hangars are privately owned. There is a second airport, Vulcan Airport.

In 2015 the town council voted to form Heritage Advisory Board Committee to manage the historical sites in Vulcan County.

== Demographics ==
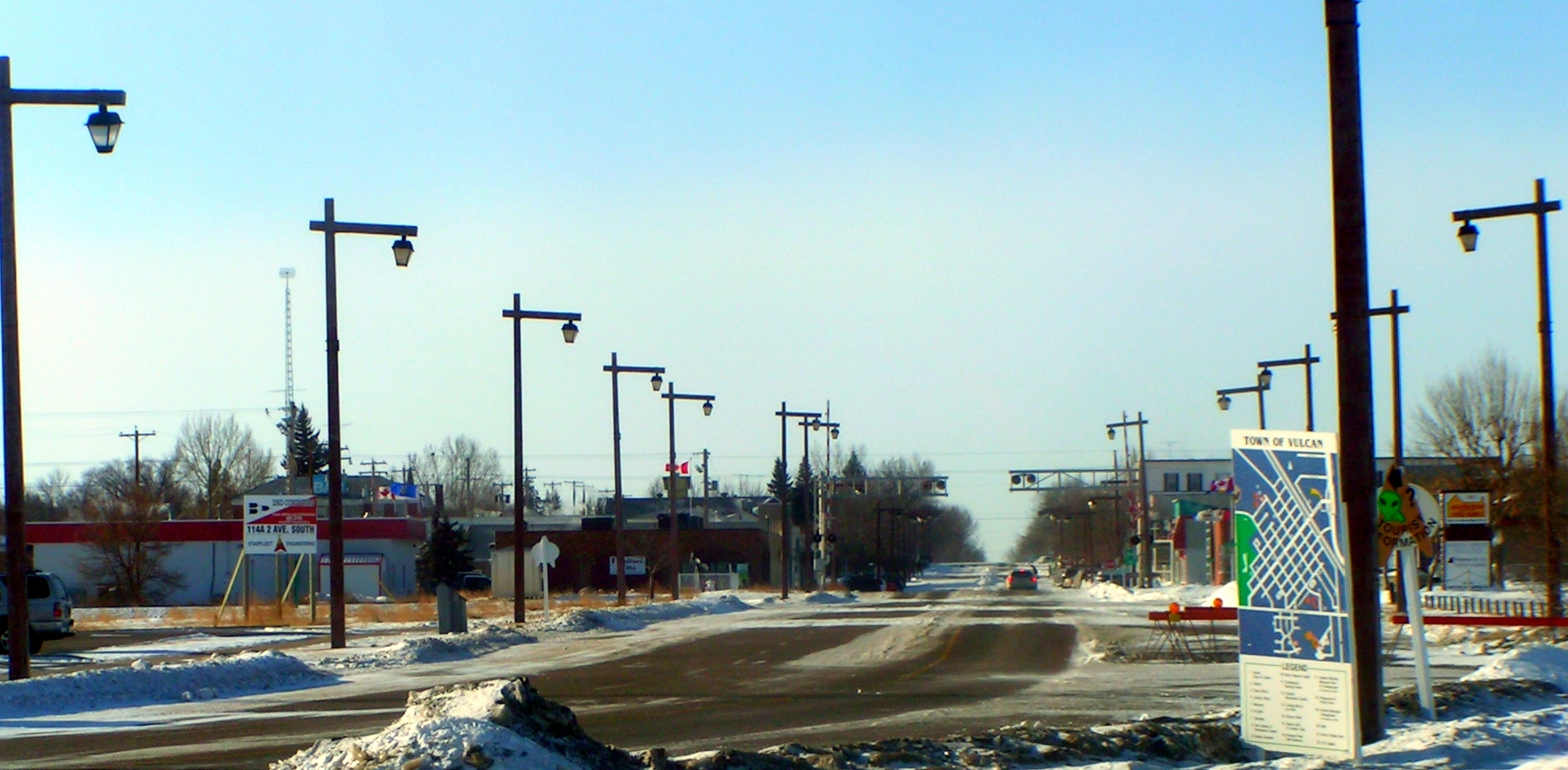
Centre Street 2008

In the 2021 Census of Population conducted by Statistics Canada, the Town of Vulcan had a population of 1,769 living in 806 of its 876 total private dwellings, a change of −7.7% from its 2016 population of 1,917. With a land area of 6.28 km^{2} (2.42 sq mi), it had a population density of 281.7/km^{2} (729.6/sq mi) in 2021.

In the 2016 Census of Population conducted by Statistics Canada, the Town of Vulcan recorded a population of 1,917 living in 829 of its 879 total private dwellings, a 4.4% change from its 2011 population of 1,836. With a land area of 6.34 km^{2} (2.45 sq mi), it had a population density of 302.4/km^{2} (783.1/sq mi) in 2016.

== Economy ==
The town's economy is mainly tourism and agriculture-based. Wheat, peas, canola and barley are the main crops grown in the Vulcan area.

Oil and gas is another industry that employs many residents of Vulcan.

=== Tourism ===
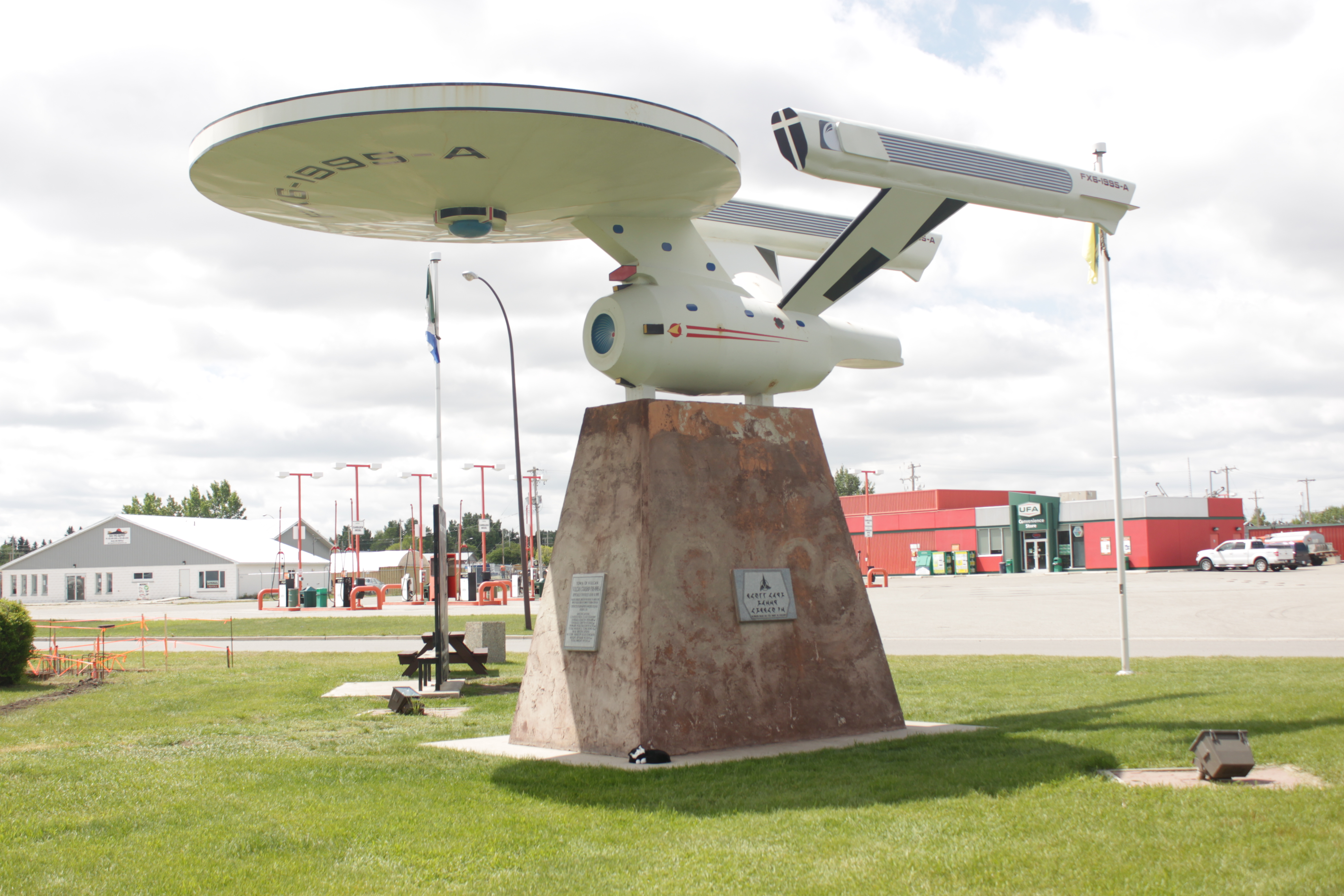
Vulcan Starship FX6-1995-A, replica of the Starship Enterprise and named after Vulcan Airport's designation CFX6

Since 1990, Vulcan has hosted the annual Vulcan Tinman Triathlon, which takes place at the beginning of June. This sprint-distance triathlon attracts nearly 1,000 participants. There are classes for adults of all ages and skill levels as well as for teams and children.

The town's name has brought some attention that has helped it become a tourist attraction. In the Star Trek television and feature film series, it is the name of the homeworld of Mr. Spock and his fellow Vulcans. Capitalizing on this coincidence, the town has built a Star Trek–themed tourist station (the Vulcan Tourism & Trek Station), which provides tourist information and displays an extensive donated collection of Star Trek memorabilia. The Trek Station also offers photo opportunities and interactions with Star Trek characters in their Cosplay Costume Collection. A replica of the starship Enterprise from Star Trek V has been mounted on a pedestal which includes writing from Star Trek alien languages, Klingon and Vulcan. In 2010, Leonard Nimoy visited the town and was honoured at the town centre with a bust and handprint. A transporter, Doctor's Mural and other Star Trek attractions can be experienced throughout the town. The Vulcan Tourism & Trek Station has hosted an annual Star Trek Convention (held the last weekend in July) "VulCON" since 1993 where celebrity guests are "beamed" in to spend the weekend with attendees. At the convention, Star Trek fans can interact with celebrity guests at a Meet & Greet, Q&A sessions, a banquet and a dance. This convention attracts hundreds of Star Trek fans from around the world.

The town also hosts another annual event called "Spock Days". This is a family-friendly weekend with a parade, children's spaces, a ball tournament, fireworks and more.

The Vulcan and District Historical Society and Archives operates a volunteer-run museum that highlights the history of Vulcan and surrounding towns in Vulcan County. It is open seasonally from mid-June to early September, but the museum building also hosts the county's archives, which is open year-round on Wednesday afternoons. The museum has nine permanent exhibits, each containing artifacts donated by community members, and each with a different theme:

- Communication technology, including functional phone booths and a telegraph machine
- Local journalism
- Medicine and healthcare on the prairie
- The family of John Ware and Mildred Lewis, whose daughters Nettie and Mildred Jr. partook in philanthropic pursuits in Vulcan and area
- Education in a one-room schoolhouse
- "Grandpa's Workshop"
- Riding and ranching
- "Nine in a Line"
- Domestic life

The room hosting information on education in prairie schoolhouses is a repurposed one-room schoolhouse from a local farm that was set to be demolished, but was instead donated and added as an expansion to the original museum building.

== Infrastructure ==
=== Healthcare ===
==== Vulcan Community Healthcare Centre ====
The Vulcan Community Healthcare Centre offers emergency and long-term care medical services. The hospital had 5,125 visits for emergency medical services in the 2013/2014 year. It has eight medical beds with 15 long-term care beds and hosts a medical clinic.

=== Emergency services ===
==== RCMP detachment ====
The Vulcan RCMP detachment offers criminal record checks, non-emergency complaints, police certificates, crime reporting, and vulnerable sector checks. It serves north up to Queenstown, east up to Lomond, south up to Peacock, and west out to Brant.

==== Fire station ====
Vulcan County fire station 27 is located beside the RCMP detachment in Vulcan. It has three fire engines.

== Geography ==
=== Climate ===
Vulcan experiences a dry continental climate (Köppen climate classification Dfb) with long, cold winters and short, warm summers.

Climate data for Vulcan Canadian Climate Normals 1981-2010 Station Data
Month	Jan	Feb	Mar	Apr	May	Jun	Jul	Aug	Sep	Oct	Nov	Dec	Year
Record high °C (°F)	15.0 (59.0)	23.0 (73.4)	20.0 (68.0)	29.0 (84.2)	33.0 (91.4)	33.0 (91.4)	36.1 (97.0)	35.5 (95.9)	35.0 (95.0)	30.5 (86.9)	22.8 (73.0)	19.0 (66.2)	36.1 (97.0)
Mean daily maximum °C (°F)	−3.1 (26.4)	0.5 (32.9)	5.3 (41.5)	12.4 (54.3)	17.5 (63.5)	21.5 (70.7)	24.5 (76.1)	25.0 (77.0)	19.1 (66.4)	12.7 (54.9)	2.8 (37.0)	−2.2 (28.0)	11.3 (52.3)
Daily mean °C (°F)	−8.8 (16.2)	−5.6 (21.9)	−0.7 (30.7)	5.3 (41.5)	10.5 (50.9)	14.6 (58.3)	17.0 (62.6)	17.1 (62.8)	11.7 (53.1)	5.9 (42.6)	−2.7 (27.1)	−7.8 (18.0)	4.7 (40.5)
Mean daily minimum °C (°F)	−14.4 (6.1)	−11.6 (11.1)	−6.7 (19.9)	−1.8 (28.8)	3.4 (38.1)	7.6 (45.7)	9.6 (49.3)	9.2 (48.6)	4.2 (39.6)	−1.0 (30.2)	−8.1 (17.4)	−13.3 (8.1)	−1.9 (28.6)
Record low °C (°F)	−37.5 (−35.5)	−37.0 (−34.6)	−31.5 (−24.7)	−20.6 (−5.1)	−6.0 (21.2)	−1.5 (29.3)	2.0 (35.6)	−2.0 (28.4)	−9.0 (15.8)	−26.0 (−14.8)	−35.0 (−31.0)	−38.3 (−36.9)	−38.3 (−36.9)
Average precipitation mm (inches)	13.1 (0.52)	12.4 (0.49)	21.2 (0.83)	22.9 (0.90)	64.4 (2.54)	74.6 (2.94)	59.7 (2.35)	49.0 (1.93)	44.6 (1.76)	17.1 (0.67)	17.7 (0.70)	18.1 (0.71)	414.8 (16.33)
Average rainfall mm (inches)	0.0 (0.0)	0.1 (0.00)	0.8 (0.03)	10.4 (0.41)	57.4 (2.26)	74.6 (2.94)	59.7 (2.35)	48.4 (1.91)	39.9 (1.57)	6.7 (0.26)	0.9 (0.04)	0.3 (0.01)	299.1 (11.78)
Average snowfall cm (inches)	13.1 (5.2)	12.3 (4.8)	20.4 (8.0)	12.5 (4.9)	7.0 (2.8)	0.0 (0.0)	0.0 (0.0)	0.6 (0.2)	4.7 (1.9)	10.4 (4.1)	16.8 (6.6)	17.9 (7.0)	115.6 (45.5)
Average precipitation days (≥ 0.2 mm)	6.5	5.7	7.6	6.5	9.9	11.5	9.8	8.1	7.4	5.4	6.5	6.3	91.1
Average rainy days (≥ 0.2 mm)	0.0	0.2	0.7	3.8	9.3	11.5	9.8	8.0	6.7	2.7	0.4	0.3	53.4
Average snowy days (≥ 0.2 cm)	6.5	5.6	6.9	3.1	1.1	0.0	0.0	0.2	0.9	3.0	6.2	6.1	39.5
Source: Environment and Climate Change Canada

== See also ==
- List of communities in Alberta
- List of towns in Alberta
