= Granum, Alberta =

Hamlet in Alberta, Canada (est. 1904)

Granum Leavings (1904–1908)
- Hamlet
- Hamlet of Granum
- Location of Granum in Alberta
- Coordinates: 49°52′25″N 113°30′27″W
- Country: Canada
- Province: Alberta
- Region: Southern Alberta
- Census division: 3
- Municipal district: Municipal District of Willow Creek No. 26
- Incorporated
  - Village: July 12, 1904
  - Name change: March 31, 1908
  - Town: November 7, 1910
- Dissolution: February 1, 2020

Area (2021)
  - Land: 1.89 km^{2} (0.73 sq mi)
- Elevation: 991 m (3,251 ft)

Population (2021)
  - Total: 557
  - Density: 295/km^{2} (760/sq mi)
- Time zone: UTC−06:00 (Alberta Time)
- Highways: Highway 2 Highway 519
- Website: Official website

Granum is a hamlet in southern Alberta, Canada that is under the jurisdiction of the Municipal District of Willow Creek No. 26. It is located at the junction of Highway 2 and Highway 519 west of Lethbridge. Incorporated as the Village of Leavings in 1904, it changed its name to Granum in 1908 and held town status between late 1910 and early 2020.

== History ==
The community originally incorporated as the Village of Leavings on July 12, 1904. It was named The Leavings as it was the site on Willow Creek west of Pultney siding where the old Bull-team Freighters stopped for water and to unload freight. Predating the railroads, it was where a trail left a river and travellers were reminded to bring water. Leavings changed its name to Granum on March 31, 1908 and then incorporated as a town on November 7, 1910. At a population of 447, Granum was Alberta's smallest town as of the 2016 census. It dissolved from town status to become a hamlet under the jurisdiction of the Municipal District of Willow Creek No. 26 on February 1, 2020.

== Geography ==
Granum is located on the edge of the prairie and the foothills of the Canadian Rockies. Viewable from the community are the mountains of Waterton-Glacier International Peace Park to the south, of the Crowsnest Pass to the west, and of Kananaskis Country to the northwest.

== Demographics ==
Historical population
| Year | Pop. | ±% |
|---|---|---|
| 1991 | 343 | — |
| 1996 | 337 | −1.7% |
| 2001 | 392 | +16.3% |
| 2006 | 415 | +5.9% |
| 2011 | 447 | +7.7% |
| 2016 | 406 | −9.2% |
| 2021 | 557 | +37.2% |

In the 2021 Census of Population conducted by Statistics Canada, Granum had a population of 557 living in 190 of its 204 total private dwellings, a change of 37.2% from its 2016 population of 406. With a land area of 1.89 km^{2} (0.73 sq mi), it had a population density of 294.7/km^{2} (763.3/sq mi) in 2021.

As a designated place in the 2016 Census of Population conducted by Statistics Canada, Granum had a population of 406 living in 199 of its 206 total private dwellings, a −9.2% change from its 2011 population of 447. With a land area of 1.91 km^{2} (0.74 sq mi), it had a population density of 212.6/km^{2} (550.5/sq mi) in 2016.

== Media ==
Historical newspapers

- Granum Times [1908 & 1928–1930]
- Granum Press [1909–1910] – Published and edited by John M. Millar
- Granum News [1911-1912 & 1917–1918]
- Granum Herald [1918–1919]
- Granum Advertiser [1920–1921] – Published and edited by John H. Salton

== See also ==
- List of communities in Alberta
- List of former urban municipalities in Alberta
- List of hamlets in Alberta
