= Picture Butte =

- Town
- Town of Picture Butte
- Nickname: Livestock Feeding Capital of Canada
- Location of Picture Butte in Alberta
- Coordinates: 49°52′23″N 112°46′48″W
- Country: Canada
- Province: Alberta
- Region: Southern Alberta
- Census division: 2
- Municipal district: Lethbridge County
- Incorporated
  - Village: February 4, 1943
  - Town: January 1, 1960

Government
  - Mayor: Cathy Moore
  - Governing body: Picture Butte Town Council

Area (2021)
  - Land: 3.02 km^{2} (1.17 sq mi)
- Elevation: 905 m (2,969 ft)

Population (2021)
  - Total: 1,930
  - Density: 639.7/km^{2} (1,657/sq mi)
- Time zone: UTC−06:00 (Alberta Time)
- Postal code span: T0K 1V0
- Highways: Highway 25; Highway 519
- Waterway: Oldman River
- Website: Official website

Picture Butte is a town in southern Alberta, Canada. It is located 27 km (17 mi) north of the city of Lethbridge. It claims the title of "Livestock Feeding Capital of Canada."

== Name ==
In 2010, Ernest and Austin Mardon stated that "the name is descriptive, being a translation of the Blackfoot 'the beautiful hill.'"

== History ==
Picture Butte received its name from a prominence southeast of town. By 1947, however, the prominence's soil had been reworked and used for street improvements, highway construction and a dyke on the shore of the Picture Butte Lake Reservoir. The prominence no longer exists.

Homesteading in the area began in the early 20th century. The building of the Lethbridge Northern Irrigation System in 1923 and the CPR rail line in 1925 stimulated an influx of settlers. The first post office opened in 1925.

In 1943, Picture Butte became a village, and it attained town status in 1961 with a population of 978.

The Canadian Sugar Factory closed in 1978 and resulted in the loss of tax revenues and employment opportunities to the town. Industrial activity consists of small service, warehousing and wholesaling industries.

Scholten farms

The town annexed approximately 165 acres (0.67 km^{2}) in 1991, significantly changing the town's boundary since the general municipal plan of 1980.

A number of farms and properties in the Picture Butte area have changed and adapted over time; for example, in 2016, the Natural Resources Conservation Board approved Scholten Farms' request to convert swine feeders to cattle feeders.

== Demographics ==
Historical population
Year	Pop.	±%
1946	689	—
1951	865	+25.5%
1971	1,062	+22.8%
1976	1,177	+10.8%
1981	1,393	+18.4%
1986	1,576	+13.1%
1991	1,559	−1.1%
1996	1,669	+7.1%
2001	1,701	+1.9%
2006	1,592	−6.4%
2011	1,650	+3.6%
2016	1,810	+9.7%

In the 2021 Census of Population conducted by Statistics Canada, the Town of Picture Butte had a population of 1,930 living in 689 of its 729 total private dwellings, a change of 6.6% from its 2016 population of 1,810. With a land area of 3.02 km^{2} (1.17 sq mi), it had a population density of 639.1/km^{2} (1,655.2/sq mi) in 2021.

In the 2016 Census of Population conducted by Statistics Canada, the Town of Picture Butte recorded a population of 1,810 living in 672 of its 706 total private dwellings, a 9.7% change from its 2011 population of 1,650. With a land area of 2.85 km^{2} (1.10 sq mi), it had a population density of 635.1/km^{2} (1,644.9/sq mi) in 2016.

== Attractions ==
As of 2023, Picture Butte has an art gallery, three schools, three churches, a sports complex, a community league, a museum and a historical village.

== Governance ==
Picture Butte's first mayor John M. Gibbons stands with Alberta Premier Ernest Manning in 1946

=== List of mayors of Picture Butte ===
- John Maurice Gibbons
- Heber Jones
- Harry Watson
- Sydney P. Johnson
- Wilfrid Hague
- Victor Edward (Ted) Crapnell
- Morgan W. Heninger
- Rick Casson
- Bert Foord
- Alex Chronik
- Elton Anderson
- Jon Stevens
- Terry Kerkhoff
- Wendy Jones
- Cathy Moore

=== Current municipal council ===
The current Picture Butte town council was elected on October 18, 2021 in the 2021 Alberta municipal elections. In 2023, the mayor was Cathy Moore and councillors included Henry deKok, Teresa Feist, Cynthia Papworth and Crystal Neels.

== Gallery ==
Photographs of Picture Butte
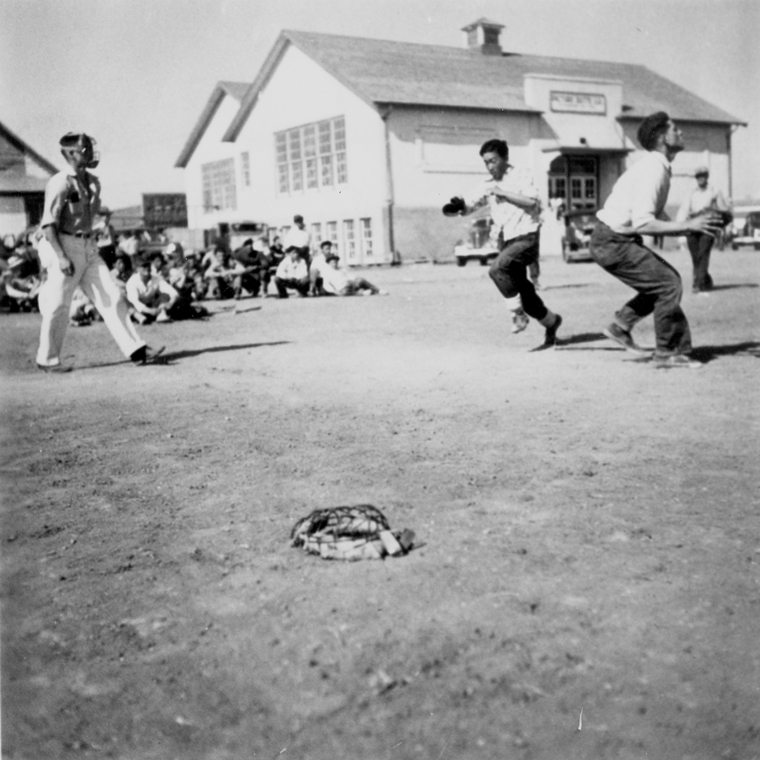
Baseball game at Picture Butte School

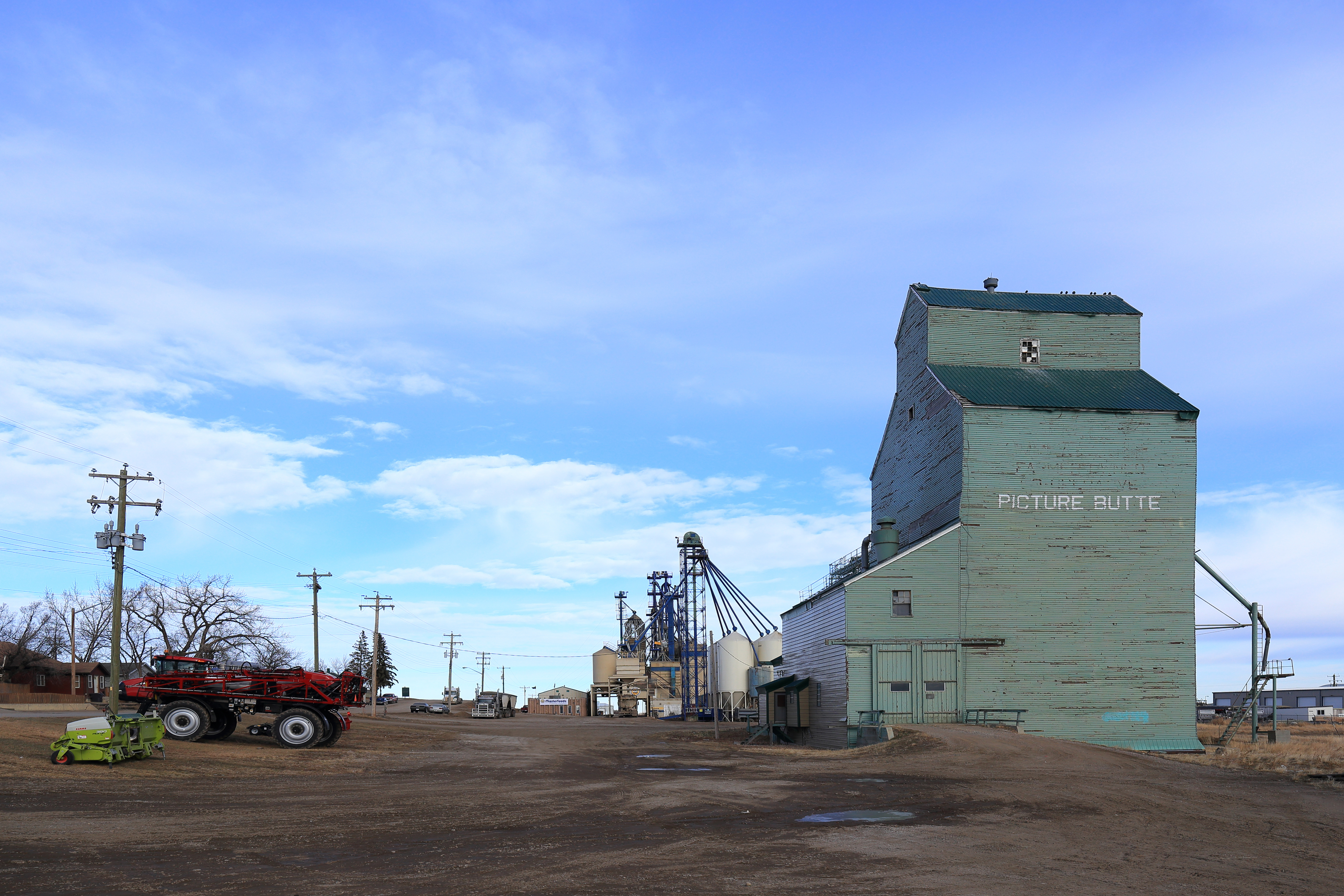
Picture Butte grain elevator

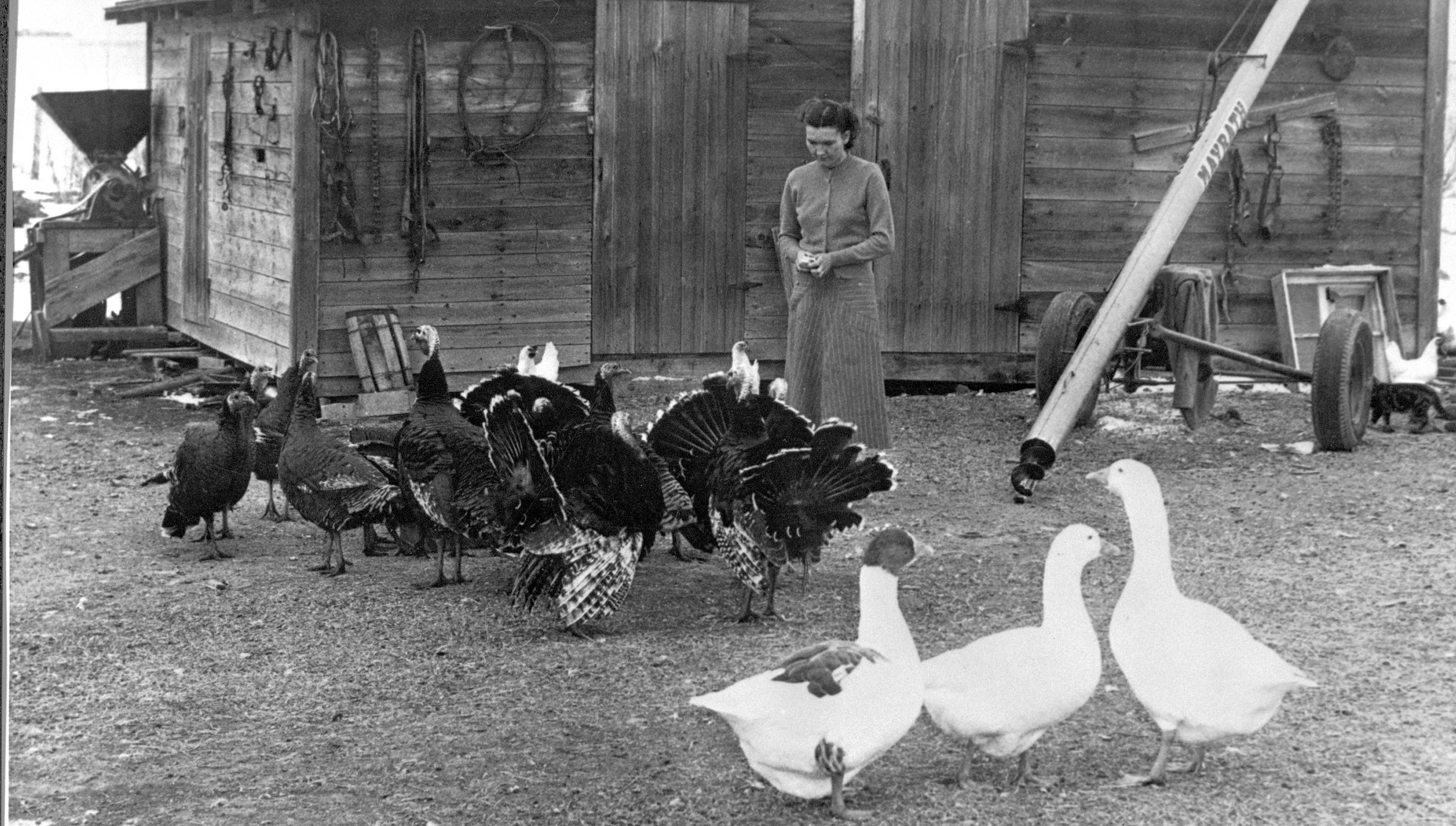
Chicken farm near Picture Butte

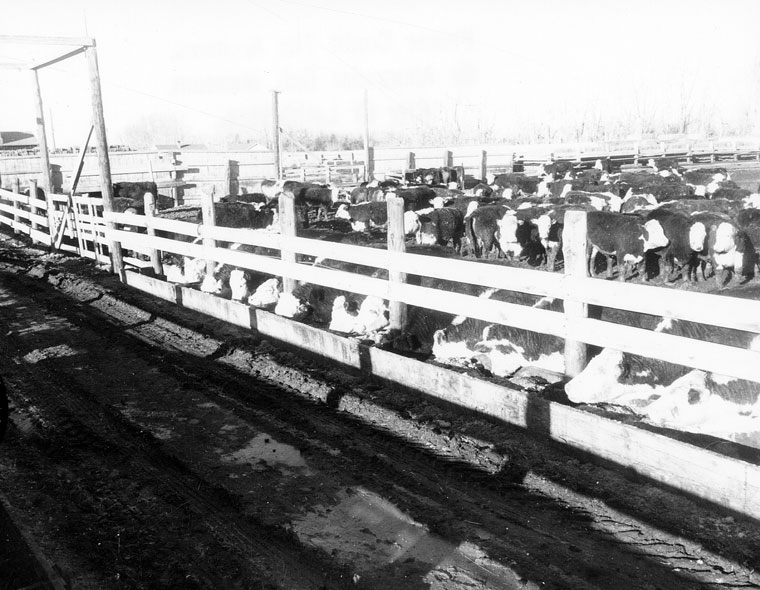
Cattle feedlot near Picture Butte

== Notable people ==
- Alex Brown Johnston, politician
- Rick Casson, politician

== See also ==
- Lethbridge County
- List of communities in Alberta
- List of towns in Alberta
- Palliser's Triangle
