= Nobleford =

Municipality in Alberta, Canada (est. 1909)

- Town
- Town of Nobleford
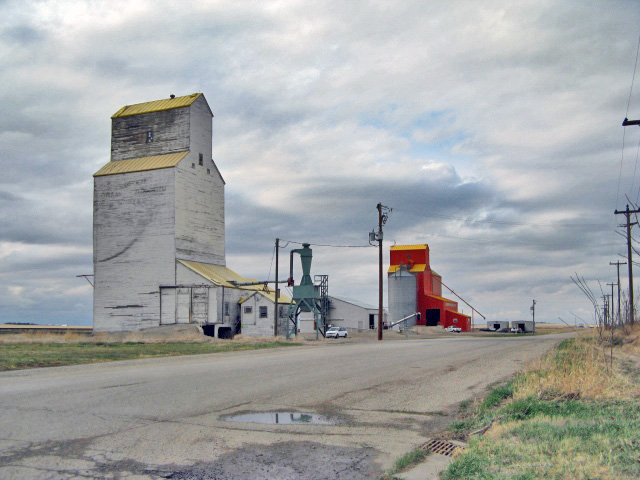
- Nobleford's now demolished grain elevators
- Motto: Home of the Noble Blade
- Location within Alberta
- Coordinates: 49°52′56″N 113°03′11″W
- Country: Canada
- Province: Alberta
- Region: Southern Alberta
- Census Division: No. 2
- Municipal district: Lethbridge County
- Founded: 1909
- Incorporated
  - Village: February 28, 1918
  - Town: February 28, 2018

Government
  - Mayor: Joan Boeder
  - Governing body: Nobleford Town Council

Area (2021)
  - Land: 1.69 km^{2} (0.65 sq mi)
- Elevation: 985 m (3,232 ft)

Population (2021)
  - Total: 1,438
  - Density: 848.6/km^{2} (2,198/sq mi)
- Time zone: UTC−06:00 (Alberta Time)
- Highways: 23; 519
- Website: Official website

Nobleford is a town in southern Alberta, Canada that is approximately 32 km (20 mi) northwest of the City of Lethbridge. It has emerged as a bedroom community of Lethbridge.

== History ==
The hamlet of Noble was established in 1909. It was named after Charles S. Noble, who owned much land in the area and built many of the local buildings. In 1910, Noble moved his family to the area from Claresholm. The hamlet was renamed Nobleford in 1913, in order to differentiate from a community in Ontario.

On February 28, 1918, Nobleford was incorporated as a village, and its first mayor was Noble. A century later to the day, Nobleford incorporated as a town on February 28, 2018.

A major employer in Nobleford from the 1930s to 1998 was a cultivator factory established by Charles Noble, manufacturing variations of the Noble blade. This reduced-tillage plow was designed to cut weed roots below the soil surface without greatly disturbing the soil, thus minimizing moisture loss in the dry, windy climate of southern Alberta.

== Government ==
The town is governed by a council comprising a mayor, a deputy mayor, and three councillors.

== Demographics ==
Historical population
Year	Pop.	±%
1921	142	—
1926 (est.)	150	+5.6%
1931	143	−4.7%
1936	117	−18.2%
1941	111	−5.1%
1946	124	+11.7%
1951	255	+105.6%
1956	263	+3.1%
1961	309	+17.5%
1966	345	+11.7%
1971	400	+15.9%
1976	417	+4.2%
1981	534	+28.1%
1986	531	−0.6%
1991	517	−2.6%
1996	558	+7.9%
2001	615	+10.2%
2006	689	+12.0%
2011	1,000	+45.1%
2016	1,278	+27.8%
2021	1,438	+12.5%
Source: Source:

In the 2021 Census of Population conducted by Statistics Canada, the Town of Nobleford had a population of 1,438 living in 446 of its 462 total private dwellings, a change of 12.5% from its 2016 population of 1,278. With a land area of 1.69 km^{2} (0.65 sq mi), it had a population density of 850.9/km^{2} (2,203.8/sq mi) in 2021.

In the 2016 Census of Population conducted by Statistics Canada, Nobleford recorded a population of 1,278 living in 404 of its 427 total private dwellings, a 27.8% change from its 2011 population of 1,000. With a land area of 1.59 km^{2} (0.61 sq mi), it had a population density of 803.8/km^{2} (2,081.8/sq mi) in 2016.

== Transportation ==
Nobleford is located on Highway 519, just east of Highway 23. It is also serviced by rail.

== Education ==
The town is served by Noble Central School, a K-12 public school that opened in 1949. It employs 15 teachers and several educational assistants, and provides education to many of the children in the town and the surrounding rural area.

== Amenities ==
The Community Complex is one of the more popular recreational facilities in Nobleford. It houses a curling rink, a large meeting room and an auditorium; it is used for such events as dances weddings and various sports.

In addition, Nobleford is home to three baseball diamonds, two soccer fields, a climbing wall, a tennis court, a skating rink, a skate park and a picnic shelter and barbecue.

Nearby Keho Lake is a popular recreational destination, most well known among windsurfers and kiteboarders, and an important agricultural water reservoir. Anglers also frequent the lake, in which northern pike, walleye, and burbot can be found. Adjacent to the lake is a nine-hole golf course.

== See also ==
- List of communities in Alberta
- List of towns in Alberta
