= Division No. 2, Alberta =

Census division in Canada

Coordinates: 49.76°N 112.26°W

Division No. 2
- Census division in Alberta
- Country: Canada
- Province: Alberta

Area
  - Total: 17,662 km^{2} (6,819 sq mi)

Population (2021)
  - Total: 178,513
  - Density: 10.107/km^{2} (26.177/sq mi)

Division No. 2 is a census division in Alberta, Canada. It is located in the south-central portion of southern Alberta and includes the City of Lethbridge.

== Census subdivisions ==
Historical population
Year	Pop.	±%
1991	119,110	—
1996	125,179	+5.1%
2001	133,913	+7.0%
2006	142,429	+6.4%
2011	156,536	+9.9%
2016	169,729	+8.4%
2021	178,513	+5.2%

The following census subdivisions (municipalities or municipal equivalents) are located within Alberta's Division No. 2.

- Cities
  - Lethbridge
  - Brooks
- Towns
  - Bassano
  - Coaldale
  - Coalhurst
  - Milk River
  - Picture Butte
  - Raymond
  - Taber
  - Vauxhall
- Villages
  - Barnwell
  - Barons
  - Coutts
  - Duchess
  - Nobleford
  - Rosemary
  - Stirling
  - Warner
- Hamlets
  - Bow City
  - Cassils
  - Chin
  - Diamond City
  - Enchant
  - Gem
  - Grassy Lake
  - Hays
  - Iron Springs
  - Monarch
  - New Dayton
  - Patricia
  - Purple Springs
  - Rainier
  - Rolling Hills
  - Scandia
  - Tilley
  - Turin
  - Wrentham
- Municipal districts
  - Lethbridge County
  - Newell, County of
  - Taber, M.D. of
  - Warner No. 5, County of

== Demographics ==
In the 2021 Census of Population conducted by Statistics Canada, Division No. 2 had a population of 178,513 living in 66,523 of its 70,936 total private dwellings, a change of 5.2% from its 2016 population of 169,729. With a land area of 17,456.33 km^{2} (6,739.93 sq mi), it had a population density of 10.2/km^{2} (26.5/sq mi) in 2021.

== See also ==
- List of census divisions of Alberta
- List of communities in Alberta
