= Lethbridge County =

Municipal district in Alberta, Canada

- Municipal district
- Logo

- Location within Alberta
- Country: Canada
- Province: Alberta
- Region: Southern Alberta
- Census division: 2
- Incorporated: January 1, 1954
- Name changes: January 1, 1964; September 6, 2000; December 4, 2013

Government
  - Reeve: Tory Campbell
  - Governing body: Lethbridge County Council: Ken Benson; Steve Campbell; Robert Horvath; Lorne Hickey; Klaas Vanderveen; Tory Campbell; Morris Zeinstra
  - CAO: Cole Beck
  - Administrative office: Lethbridge

Area (2021)
  - Land: 2,815.66 km^{2} (1,087.13 sq mi)

Population (2021)
  - Total: 10,120
  - Density: 3.6/km^{2} (9.3/sq mi)
- Time zone: UTC−06:00 (Alberta Time)
- Website: lethcounty.ca

Lethbridge County is a municipal district in southern Alberta, Canada. It is in Census Division No. 2 and part of the Lethbridge census agglomeration. It was known as the County of Lethbridge prior to December 4, 2013. Its name was changed in time for 2014 to coincide with its 50th anniversary.

== History ==
Lethbridge County encompasses an area that was originally under the jurisdiction of six municipalities. It was originally formed as the Municipal District of Lethbridge No. 25 on January 1, 1954 by amalgamating the municipal districts of Bright No. 16 and Barons No. 25 and portions of Special Area No. 4, the County of Vulcan No. 2 and the municipal districts of Warner No. 4 and Sugar City No. 5. Ten years later, on January 1, 1964, the Municipal District of Lethbridge No. 25 joined with Lethbridge School Division No. 7 to become the County of Lethbridge No. 26. It subsequently changed its name to the County of Lethbridge on September 6, 2000 and then again to Lethbridge County on December 4, 2013.

== Geography ==
=== Communities and localities ===
The following urban municipalities are surrounded by Lethbridge County.

Cities

- Lethbridge

Towns

- Coaldale
- Coalhurst
- Picture Butte

Villages

- Barons
- Nobleford

Summer villages

- none

The following hamlets are located within Lethbridge County.

Hamlets

- Chin
- Diamond City
- Fairview
- Iron Springs
- Kipp
- Monarch
- Shaughnessy
- Turin

The following localities are located within Lethbridge County.

Localities

- Agriculture Research
- Albion Ridge
- Broxburn
- Commerce
- Eastview Acres
- Ghent
- Lenzie
- McDermott or McDermott Subdivision
- Piyami

- Stewart
- Stewart Siding
- Sunset Acres
- Tempest
- Tennion
- Westview Acres
- Whitney
- Wilson or Wilson Siding

== Demographics ==
In the 2021 Census of Population conducted by Statistics Canada, Lethbridge County had a population of 10,120 living in 2,890 of its 3,136 total private dwellings, a change of −1.1% from its 2016 population of 10,237. With a land area of 2,815.66 km^{2} (1,087.13 sq mi), it had a population density of 3.6/km^{2} (9.3/sq mi) in 2021.

In the 2016 Census of Population conducted by Statistics Canada, Lethbridge County had a population of 10,353 living in 2,968 of its 3,129 total private dwellings, a 3.1% change from its 2011 population of 10,046. With a land area of 2,836.64 km^{2} (1,095.23 sq mi), it had a population density of 3.6/km^{2} (9.5/sq mi) in 2016.

== Economy ==
The economy of the county is primarily agricultural, including the well known "Feedlot Alley", a 500 km^{2} area of intensive livestock operations.

== Government ==
The county is governed by a council of seven councillors, elected every four years, from seven electoral divisions. The last election was in October 2013. The council chooses a reeve to be their head. It meets in offices located in Lethbridge.

== See also ==
- List of communities in Alberta
- List of municipal districts in Alberta
