= Lomond, Alberta =

Lomond
- Village
- Village of Lomond
- Location within Alberta
- Coordinates: 50°21′14″N 112°38′27″W
- Country: Canada
- Province: Alberta
- Region: Southern Alberta
- Census Division: No. 5
- Municipal district: Vulcan County
- Incorporated
  - Village: February 16, 1916

Government
  - Type: Mayor–council government
  - Mayor: Brad Koch
  - Governing body: Lomond Village Council

Area (2021)
  - Land: 1.19 km^{2} (0.46 sq mi)
- Elevation: 874 m (2,867 ft)

Population (2021)
  - Total: 178
  - Density: 149.3/km^{2} (387/sq mi)
- Time zone: UTC−06:00 (Alberta Time)
- Forward sortation area: T0L 1G0
- Area codes: 403, 587, 825
- Highways: Highway 845; Highway 531
- Waterways: McGregor Lake
- Website: villageoflomond.ca

Lomond is a village in southern Alberta, Canada that is surrounded by Vulcan County. It is located at the intersection of Highway 845 and Highway 531, approximately 74 kilometres (46 mi) southwest of Brooks and 49 kilometres (30 mi) east of Vulcan. The village is a farming service community. Lomond was named for Loch Lomond, Scotland.

== Demographics ==
In the 2021 Census of Population conducted by Statistics Canada, the Village of Lomond had a population of 178 living in 77 of its 98 total private dwellings, a change of 7.2% from its 2016 population of 166. With a land area of 1.19 km^{2} (0.46 sq mi), it had a population density of 149.6/km^{2} (387.4/sq mi) in 2021.

In the 2016 Census of Population conducted by Statistics Canada, the Village of Lomond recorded a population of 166 living in 73 of its 101 total private dwellings, a −4% change from its 2011 population of 173. With a land area of 1.21 km^{2} (0.47 sq mi), it had a population density of 137.2/km^{2} (355.3/sq mi) in 2016.

== Government ==
The village is governed by a village council comprising a mayor, and two councillors, and is administered by a village chief administrative officer.

== Sports ==
Lomond is home to the Lomond Lakers of the Heritage Junior B Hockey League. The team was added as an expansion team in the league for the 2018–19 season.

They originally played out of the Lomond Community Centre. In April 2018, issues were discovered with the centre's roof and in May 2019, the centre was demolished. The team currently plays its home games in Claresholm, 110 km west of Lomond.

== See also ==
- List of communities in Alberta
- List of villages in Alberta
