= Southern Alberta =

Region of Alberta, Canada (est. 1905)

Coordinates: 50°N 112°W

Southern Alberta is a region located in the Canadian province of Alberta. In 2016, the region's population was approximately 291,112. The primary cities are Lethbridge and Medicine Hat. (The adjacent Calgary Metropolitan Region is often said to be within southern Alberta, in a wider sense.)

Southern Alberta is known mostly for agricultural production, but alternative energy, film production, tourism and other types of economic activity also have strength.

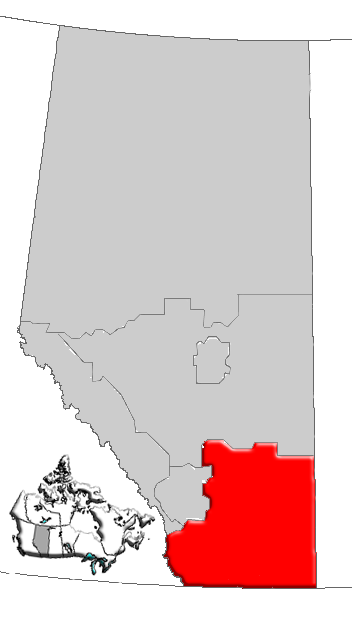

== Geography ==
Southern Alberta has a total area of approximately 75,500 km^{2} (29,151 sq mi).

Southern Alberta is in the northern Great Plains region, bordered on the west by the Canadian Rocky Mountains and their foothills. The rest of the region is dominated by semi-arid prairies of the Palliser's Triangle, where farms and ranches are productive, often with the help of irrigation. Rivers generally flow from west to east, into the Hudsons Bay. These include the Oldman River, Bow River, Red Deer River, South Saskatchewan River, and Milk River. Milk River in southern Alberta is the only river in Canada that eventually flows into the Gulf of Mexico.

The environment is protected in such areas as Waterton Lakes National Park and Cypress Hills Interprovincial Park, while sites such as Head-Smashed-In Buffalo Jump, Dinosaur Provincial Park and Writing-on-Stone Provincial Park were declared UNESCO World Heritage Sites. The Alberta Badlands lie in the northeast of the region, prominently along the Red Deer River. Cypress Hills, located in the east, at the border with Saskatchewan, are the highest points between the Rocky Mountains and Labrador.

== Infrastructure ==
=== Major highways ===
- Highway 1 (Transcanada Highway)
- Highway 2 (QE2)
- Highway 3 (Crowsnest Highway)
- Highway 4
- Highway 5
- Highway 36 (Veteran Memorial Highway)
- Highway 41 (Buffalo Trail)

=== Health care ===
Health care in the region is overseen by Alberta Health Services. It was formerly served by Calgary Health Region, Chinook Health and Palliser Health Region before they were amalgamated with the other six regional health boards in 2008 to form Alberta Health Services.

== Economy ==
In 2007, Alberta Human Resources and Employment reported the fields of finance, insurance, real estate, professions, technicians and senior managers will lead the Lethbridge–Medicine Hat region's growth with an average 2.8% real GDP growth each year until 2011. The industries of manufacturing, energy, mining, and forestry would account for 2.6% each. All ten of these fields would account for more than half of the region's domestic product.

| Sector | Labour force | % of total |
|---|---|---|
| Agriculture | 18,085 | 13% |
| Mining | 6,450 | 5% |
| Manufacturing | 11,930 | 9% |
| Construction | 10,020 | 7% |
| Transportation and utilities | 7,450 | 5% |
| Retail and wholesale | 19,865 | 15% |
| Finance | 4,700 | 3% |
| Business and community services | 52,110 | 38% |
| Public administration | 6,110 | 4% |

== Politics ==
On a provincial level, southern Alberta is represented in the Legislative Assembly of Alberta by MLAs elected in the ridings of Airdrie-Cochrane, Airdrie-East, Banff-Kananaskis, Brooks-Medicine Hat, Cardston-Siksika, Chestermere-Strathmore, Cypress-Medicine Hat, Highwood, Lethbridge East, Lethbridge West, Livingstone-Macleod, and Taber-Warner.

== Municipalities ==
Cities

- Brooks
- Lethbridge
- Medicine Hat

Towns

- Bassano
- Bow Island
- Cardston
- Claresholm
- Coaldale
- Coalhurst
- Drumheller
- Fort Macleod
- Granum
- Hanna
- Magrath
- Milk River
- Nanton
- Nobleford
- Oyen
- Picture Butte
- Pincher Creek
- Raymond
- Redcliff
- Stavely
- Strathmore
- Taber
- Three Hills
- Trochu
- Vauxhall
- Vulcan

Villages

- Acme
- Arrowwood
- Barnwell
- Barons
- Carbon
- Carmangay
- Cereal
- Champion
- Coutts
- Cowley
- Delia
- Duchess
- Empress
- Foremost
- Glenwood
- Hill Spring
- Hussar
- Linden
- Lomond
- Milo
- Morrin
- Munson
- Rockyford
- Rosemary
- Standard
- Stirling
- Tilley
- Warner
- Youngstown

Specialized municipalities

- Crowsnest Pass

Improvement districts

- Improvement District No. 4 (Waterton)

Municipal districts

- Acadia No. 34, Municipal District (M.D.) of
- Cardston County
- Cypress County
- Forty Mile No. 8, County of
- Kneehill County
- Lethbridge County
- Newell, County of
- Pincher Creek No. 9, M.D. of
- Ranchland No. 66, M.D. of
- Starland County
- Taber, M.D. of
- Vulcan County
- Warner No. 5, County of
- Wheatland County
- Willow Creek No. 26, M.D. of

Special areas

- Special Area No. 2
- Special Area No. 3
