= List of Canada Games =

The Canada Games are a strictly amateur multi-sport event held in Canada biannually, alternating between Summer and Winter editions. Athletes enter the Games representing each of their respective 13 provinces or territories. The first Games were held as part of Canada's Centennial Year Celebrations in 1967. Ontario and Quebec remain the only two provinces to win the Canada Winter Games thus far, with British Columbia and Alberta constantly secured in the third and fourth positions.

== Host Cities ==
=== Summer ===
Edition	Year	Host city	Host Province/Territory	Start Date	End Date	Competitors	Sports	Canada Games flag
1	1969	Halifax	Nova Scotia	August 16	August 24	715	15	Ontario
2	1973	New Westminster – Burnaby	British Columbia	August 3	August 12	1,676	16	British Columbia
3	1977	St. John's	Newfoundland and Labrador	August 7	August 19	1,709	18	Ontario
4	1981	Thunder Bay	Ontario	August 9	August 22	1,813	18	Ontario
5	1985	Saint John	New Brunswick	August 11	August 24	2,465	18	Ontario
6	1989	Saskatoon	Saskatchewan	August 8	August 21	2,465	18	Ontario
7	1993	Kamloops	British Columbia	August 6	August 22	3,253	17	Ontario
8	1997	Brandon	Manitoba	August 9	August 23	3,364	19	Ontario
9	2001	London	Ontario	August 10	August 25	3,487	18	Ontario
10	2005	Regina	Saskatchewan	August 6	August 20	3,511	16	Ontario
11	2009	Charlottetown-Summerside	Prince Edward Island	August 15	August 29	3,432	18	Ontario
13	2013	Sherbrooke	Quebec	August 2	August 17	3,361	19	Ontario
14	2017	Winnipeg	Manitoba	July 28	August 13	3,382	18	Ontario
15	2022*	Niagara Region	Ontario	August 6	August 21	5,000+	18	Ontario
16	2025	St. John's	Newfoundland and Labrador	August 8	August 24	4,000+	19	Quebec
17	2029	Moncton-Saint John	New Brunswick	TBD	TBD			
18	2033	TBD	Saskatchewan	TBD	TBD			
19	2037	TBD	Nova Scotia	TBD	TBD			

- The 2022 Canada Games were scheduled to be held in 2021, but were rescheduled to 2022 due to the COVID-19 pandemic.

=== Winter ===
Edition	Year	Host city	Host Province/Territory	Start Date	End Date	Competitors	Sports	Canada Games flag
1	1967	Quebec City	Quebec	February 11	February 19	557	15	Ontario
2	1971	Saskatoon	Saskatchewan	February 11	February 22	687	17	Ontario
3	1975	Lethbridge	Alberta	February 11	February 23	664	17	Quebec
4	1979	Brandon	Manitoba	February 12	February 24	1,962	17	Quebec
5	1983	Saguenay–Lac-Saint-Jean	Quebec	February 17	March 2	1,900	19	Ontario
6	1987	Cape Breton	Nova Scotia	February 14	February 28	1,995	17	Ontario
7	1991	Charlottetown	Prince Edward Island	February 17	March 2	2,304	19	Ontario
8	1995	Grande Prairie	Alberta	February 19	March 4	2,284	21	Ontario
9	1999	Corner Brook	Newfoundland and Labrador	February 20	March 6	2,808	21	Ontario
10	2003	Bathurst-Campbellton	New Brunswick	February 22	March 8	2,606	21	Quebec
11	2007	Whitehorse	Yukon	February 23	March 10	2,678	22	Ontario
12	2011	Halifax	Nova Scotia	February 11	February 27	2,238	20	Ontario
13	2015	Prince George	British Columbia	February 13	March 1	2,345	20	Ontario
14	2019	Red Deer	Alberta	February 17	March 3	2,377	20	Quebec
15	2023	Prince Edward Island	Prince Edward Island	February 18	March 5	3,600	21	Quebec
16	2027	Quebec City	Quebec	TBD	TBD	TBD	TBD	
17	2031	TBD	Quebec	TBD	TBD	TBD	TBD	
18	2035	TBD	Northwest Territories	TBD	TBD	TBD	TBD	

=== Host provinces/territories ===
List of regions ranked by the number of times they hosted the Canada Games
Rank	Province/Territory	Summer	Winter	Total
1	Quebec	1 (2013)	3 (1967, 1983, 2027, 2031)	5
2	Nova Scotia	2 (1969, 2037)	2 (1987, 2011)	4
2	Saskatchewan	3 (1989, 2005, 2033)	1 (1971)	4
4	Alberta	0	3 (1975, 1995, 2019)	3
4	British Columbia	2 (1973, 1993)	1 (2015)	3
4	Manitoba	2 (1997, 2017)	1 (1979)	3
4	New Brunswick	2 (1985, 2029)	1 (2003)	3
4	Newfoundland and Labrador	2 (1977, 2025)	1 (1999)	3
4	Prince Edward Island	1 (2009)	2 (1991, 2023)	3
4	Ontario	3 (1981, 2001, 2022)	0	3
11	Northwest Territories	0	1 (2035)	1
11	Yukon	0	1 (2007)	1
13	Nunavut	0	0	0

=== Map of host cities ===
Host cities of Canada Games

== Total medals ==
As of the 2022 Canada Games

Rank	Province/Territory	Gold	Silver	Bronze	Total
1	Ontario	1297	1092	1013	3402
2	Quebec	1117	975	932	3024
3	British Columbia	730	809	773	2312
4	Alberta	505	569	668	1742
5	Saskatchewan	196	269	348	813
6	Manitoba	172	224	308	704
7	Nova Scotia	209	211	232	652
8	New Brunswick	72	92	165	329
9	Newfoundland and Labrador	20	48	71	139
10	Prince Edward Island	12	21	26	59
11	Yukon	15	23	19	57
12	Northwest Territories	7	6	9	22
13	Nunavut	1	0	1	2

== Canada Games Editions ==
=== 1967 Canada Winter Games ===
The 1967 Canada Winter Games were held in Quebec City, Quebec. These were the first Canada Games held, and were part of the celebrations for Canada's Centennial Year.

Rank	Province/Territory	Gold	Silver	Bronze	Total
1	Ontario	21	21	11	53
2	Quebec	16	7	15	38
3	British Columbia	6	15	9	30
4	Alberta	8	8	10	26
5	Manitoba	6	6	10	22
6	Saskatchewan	3	0	4	7
7	Northwest Territories	1	2	1	4
8	Nova Scotia	1	1	2	4
9	New Brunswick	0	1	0	1
9	(United Kingdom) Newfoundland	0	1	0	1
11	Prince Edward Island	0	0	0	0
11	Yukon Territory	0	0	0	0

=== 1969 Canada Summer Games ===
The 1969 Canada Summer Games were held in Halifax and Dartmouth, Nova Scotia.

Rank	Province/Territory	Gold	Silver	Bronze	Total
1	Ontario	51	24	29	104
2	British Columbia	36	43	21	100
3	Quebec	9	14	17	40
4	Alberta	10	9	20	39
5	Nova Scotia	3	8	7	18
6	Manitoba	1	7	10	18
7	Saskatchewan	1	5	6	12
8	New Brunswick	1	1	1	3
9	Prince Edward Island	1	0	0	1
10	(United Kingdom) Newfoundland	0	0	1	1
11	Northwest Territories	0	0	0	0
11	Yukon Territory	0	0	0	0

=== 1971 Canada Winter Games ===
The 1971 Canada Winter Games were held in Saskatoon, Saskatchewan.

Rank	Province/Territory	Gold	Silver	Bronze	Total
1	Ontario	41	31	21	93
2	British Columbia	24	15	25	64
3	Quebec	10	26	24	60
4	Alberta	8	12	11	31
5	Manitoba	11	7	8	26
6	Saskatchewan	3	7	7	17
7	Nova Scotia	0	2	5	7
8	New Brunswick	2	1	3	6
9	Northwest Territories	2	1	2	5
10	(United Kingdom) Newfoundland	1	0	3	4
11	Prince Edward Island	0	1	2	3
12	Yukon Territory	0	0	1	1

=== 1973 Canada Summer Games ===
The 1973 Canada Summer Games were held in New Westminster and Burnaby, British Columbia.

Rank	Province/Territory	Gold	Silver	Bronze	Total
1	Ontario	18	26	22	66
2	British Columbia	30	16	15	61
3	Quebec	14	16	13	43
4	Alberta	9	7	11	27
5	Manitoba	1	8	7	16
6	Nova Scotia	4	2	4	10
7	Saskatchewan	0	2	2	4
8	New Brunswick	0	0	1	1
9	Prince Edward Island	0	0	0	0
9	(United Kingdom) Newfoundland	0	0	0	0
9	Yukon Territory	0	0	0	0
9	Northwest Territories	0	0	0	0

=== 1975 Canada Winter Games ===
The 1975 Canada Winter Games were held in Lethbridge, Alberta.

Rank	Province/Territory	Gold	Silver	Bronze	Total
1	Quebec	30	18	24	72
2	Ontario	21	28	19	68
3	British Columbia	15	21	13	49
4	Alberta	14	6	12	32
5	Manitoba	6	14	4	24
6	Saskatchewan	2	5	16	23
7	Nova Scotia	2	4	5	11
8	New Brunswick	3	0	5	8
9	(United Kingdom) Newfoundland	1	1	5	7
10	Northwest Territories	2	0	2	4
11	Prince Edward Island	0	1	1	2
12	Yukon Territory	0	1	0	1

=== 1977 Canada Summer Games ===
The 1977 Canada Summer Games were held in St. John's, Newfoundland and Labrador.

Rank	Province/Territory	Gold	Silver	Bronze	Total
1	Ontario	48	37	23	108
2	Quebec	33	32	27	92
3	British Columbia	16	20	27	63
4	Alberta	10	8	15	33
5	Nova Scotia	5	9	4	18
6	Manitoba	0	5	8	13
7	Saskatchewan	2	3	6	11
8	New Brunswick	1	2	3	6
9	(United Kingdom) Newfoundland	1	0	3	4
10	Prince Edward Island	0	0	0	0
10	Yukon Territory	0	0	0	0
10	Northwest Territories	0	0	0	0

=== 1979 Canada Winter Games ===
The 1979 Canada Winter Games were held in Brandon, Manitoba.

Rank	Province/Territory	Gold	Silver	Bronze	Total
1	Quebec	47	20	26	93
2	Ontario	20	39	22	73
3	British Columbia	11	18	14	43
4	Alberta	8	13	17	38
5	Manitoba	9	9	12	30
6	Nova Scotia	3	7	7	17
7	Saskatchewan	3	1	11	15
8	New Brunswick	6	1	1	8
9	Prince Edward Island	1	4	1	6
10	(United Kingdom) Newfoundland	1	1	2	4
11	Yukon Territory	0	0	2	2
12	Northwest Territories	0	0	0	0

=== 1981 Canada Summer Games ===
The 1981 Canada Summer Games were held in Thunder Bay, Ontario.

Rank	Province/Territory	Gold	Silver	Bronze	Total
1	Ontario	52	28	32	112
2	Quebec	19	39	22	80
3	British Columbia	18	26	18	62
4	Alberta	15	10	18	43
5	Nova Scotia	11	4	2	17
6	Manitoba	4	4	8	16
7	Saskatchewan	0	4	11	15
8	New Brunswick	0	2	4	6
9	Newfoundland	0	1	4	5
10	Yukon Territory	0	0	0	0
10	Prince Edward Island	0	0	0	0
10	Northwest Territories	0	0	0	0

=== 1983 Canada Winter Games ===
The 1983 Canada Winter Games were held in Saguenay/Lac Saint-Jean, Quebec

Rank	Province/Territory	Gold	Silver	Bronze	Total
1	Quebec	33	38	27	98
2	Ontario	39	24	23	86
3	British Columbia	14	16	20	50
4	Saskatchewan	9	8	15	32
5	Alberta	7	13	10	30
6	Manitoba	7	5	11	23
7	Nova Scotia	2	5	11	18
8	New Brunswick	5	3	9	17
9	Prince Edward Island	1	2	2	5
10	Newfoundland	0	1	3	4
11	Northwest Territories	0	1	0	1
12	Yukon Territory	0	0	0	0

=== 1985 Canada Summer Games ===
The 1985 Canada Summer Games were held at the University of New Brunswick in Saint John, New Brunswick.

Rank	Province/Territory	Gold	Silver	Bronze	Total
1	Ontario	56	37	24	117
2	Quebec	24	36	38	98
3	British Columbia	31	30	20	81
4	Alberta	12	11	21	44
5	Nova Scotia	5	12	11	28
6	Manitoba	2	6	7	15
7	New Brunswick	3	4	7	14
8	Saskatchewan	4	0	7	11
9	Yukon Territory	0	2	0	2
10	Newfoundland	0	0	2	2
11	Prince Edward Island	0	0	0	0
11	Northwest Territories	0	0	0	0

=== 1987 Canada Winter Games ===
The 1987 Canada Winter Games were held in Cape Breton County, Nova Scotia.

Rank	Province/Territory	Gold	Silver	Bronze	Total
1	Quebec	47	30	21	98
2	Ontario	20	26	34	80
3	British Columbia	15	14	19	48
4	Alberta	7	9	19	35
5	Manitoba	12	9	9	30
6	Saskatchewan	6	10	13	29
7	New Brunswick	3	5	9	17
8	Newfoundland	1	5	7	13
9	Nova Scotia	5	2	5	10
10	Yukon Territory	0	2	0	2
11	Prince Edward Island	0	1	0	1
12	Northwest Territories	0	0	0	0

=== 1989 Canada Summer Games ===
The 1989 Canada Summer Games were held in Saskatoon, Saskatchewan.

Rank	Province/Territory	Gold	Silver	Bronze	Total
1	Ontario	43	37	37	117
2	Quebec	33	23	27	83
3	British Columbia	23	38	20	81
4	Alberta	16	19	15	50
5	Saskatchewan	14	13	18	45
6	Manitoba	6	6	17	29
7	Nova Scotia	5	9	8	22
8	New Brunswick	8	1	6	15
9	Newfoundland	0	2	3	5
10	Prince Edward Island	0	1	0	1
10	Yukon Territory	0	1	0	1
12	Northwest Territories	0	0	0	0

=== 1991 Canada Winter Games ===
The 1991 Canada Winter Games were held in Charlottetown, Prince Edward Island.

Rank	Province/Territory	Gold	Silver	Bronze	Total
1	Quebec	63	44	33	140
2	Ontario	43	49	31	123
3	Alberta	16	16	36	68
4	British Columbia	14	17	33	64
5	Saskatchewan	12	14	14	40
6	Manitoba	9	12	19	40
7	Nova Scotia	6	5	10	21
8	Yukon Territory	4	10	3	17
9	New Brunswick	1	4	10	15
10	Prince Edward Island	1	0	3	4
11	Newfoundland	0	1	3	4
12	Northwest Territories	1	0	1	2

=== 1993 Canada Summer Games ===
The 1993 Canada Summer Games were held in Kamloops, British Columbia.

Rank	Province/Territory	Gold	Silver	Bronze	Total
1	Ontario	45	43	49	137
2	Quebec	43	32	43	118
3	British Columbia	36	41	34	111
4	Alberta	14	20	1	45
5	Saskatchewan	13	17	10	40
6	Nova Scotia	11	10	10	31
7	Manitoba	4	5	10	19
8	New Brunswick	2	2	2	6
9	Newfoundland	2	1	0	3
10	Prince Edward Island	0	0	1	1
11	Yukon Territory	0	0	0	0
11	Northwest Territories	0	0	0	0

=== 1995 Canada Winter Games ===
The 1995 Canada Winter Games were held in Grande Prairie, Alberta

Rank	Province/Territory	Gold	Silver	Bronze	Total
1	Quebec	48	45	44	137
2	Ontario	35	37	42	114
3	Alberta	30	19	32	81
4	British Columbia	10	14	27	51
5	Saskatchewan	13	11	8	32
6	New Brunswick	4	7	10	21
7	Nova Scotia	2	6	12	20
8	Manitoba	6	5	2	13
9	Newfoundland	2	4	3	9
10	Yukon Territory	2	3	1	6
11	Prince Edward Island	0	1	1	2
12	Northwest Territories	0	0	0	0

=== 1997 Canada Summer Games ===
The 1997 Canada Summer Games were held in Brandon, Manitoba.

Rank	Province/Territory	Gold	Silver	Bronze	Total
1	Ontario	64	36	55	154
2	Quebec	46	49	31	126
3	British Columbia	31	36	32	99
4	Alberta	14	23	36	73
5	Saskatchewan	8	14	12	34
6	Nova Scotia	16	11	6	33
7	Manitoba	8	9	7	24
8	New Brunswick	2	8	7	17
9	Newfoundland	0	1	3	4
10	Prince Edward Island	0	0	0	0
10	Yukon Territory	0	0	0	0
10	Northwest Territories	0	0	0	0

=== 1999 Canada Winter Games ===
The 1999 Canada Winter Games were held in Corner Brook, Newfoundland and Labrador.

Rank	Province/Territory	Gold	Silver	Bronze	Total
1	Ontario	44	37	36	117
2	Quebec	48	32	29	109
3	British Columbia	15	27	38	80
4	Alberta	18	21	26	65
5	Manitoba	7	5	14	26
6	Saskatchewan	6	6	7	19
7	Newfoundland	6	4	9	19
8	Nova Scotia	5	4	8	17
9	New Brunswick	0	2	12	14
10	Yukon Territory	0	2	0	2
10	Prince Edward Island	0	2	0	2
12	Northwest Territories	0	0	0	0

=== 2001 Canada Summer Games ===
The 2001 Canada Summer Games were held in London, Ontario.

Rank	Province/Territory	Gold	Silver	Bronze	Total
1	Ontario	59	51	45	155
2	British Columbia	35	37	37	109
3	Quebec	24	33	33	99
4	Alberta	23	21	25	69
5	Saskatchewan	12	20	20	52
6	Nova Scotia	23	13	11	47
7	Manitoba	11	9	11	31
8	New Brunswick	4	2	7	13
9	Newfoundland	1	4	2	7
10	Prince Edward Island	0	0	0	0
10	Northwest Territories	0	0	0	0
10	Nunavut	0	0	0	0
10	Yukon Territory	0	0	0	0

ordered by total medals, ranked by medal type

=== 2003 Canada Winter Games ===
The 2003 Canada Winter Games were held in Bathurst/Campbellton, New Brunswick

Rank	Province/Territory	Gold	Silver	Bronze	Total
1	Quebec	60	38	32	130
2	Ontario	31	22	45	98
3	Alberta	28	35	28	91
4	British Columbia	11	27	29	67
5	Saskatchewan	13	13	11	37
6	Manitoba	6	11	17	34
7	New Brunswick	4	4	11	19
8	Nova Scotia	2	1	5	8
9	Prince Edward Island	0	3	4	7
10	Northwest Territories	0	1	2	3
11	Newfoundland and Labrador	0	1	1	2
12	Nunavut	0	0	0	0
12	Yukon	0	0	0	0

ordered by total medals, ranked by medal type

=== 2005 Canada Summer Games ===
The 2005 Canada Summer Games were held in Regina, Saskatchewan.

==== Standings ====
Rank	Province/Territory	Gold	Silver	Bronze	Total
1	Ontario	63	45	50	158
2	Quebec	50	42	43	135
3	British Columbia	42	44	33	119
4	Alberta	29	34	37	100
5	Saskatchewan	15	26	26	67
6	Nova Scotia	15	15	16	46
7	Manitoba	4	7	6	17
8	Newfoundland and Labrador	0	4	5	9
9	New Brunswick	1	4	1	6
10	Prince Edward Island	2	0	0	2
11	Yukon	0	0	1	1
12	Northwest Territories	0	0	0	0
12	Nunavut	0	0	0	0

==== Sports ====
- Athletics
- Baseball
- Basketball
- Canoeing
- Cycling
- Diving
- Field Hockey
- Rowing
- Rugby union
- Sailing
- Soccer
  - Women's Soccer
  - Men's Soccer
- Softball
  - Women's Softball
  - Men's Softball
- Swimming
- Tennis
- Volleyball
- Wrestling

=== 2007 Canada Winter Games ===
The 2007 Canada Winter Games were held in Whitehorse, Yukon. These were the first Canada Games held North of 60 (in the polar regions). The games were held concurrent with the Inuit Games and Dene Games.

==== Standings ====
Rank	Province/Territory	Gold	Silver	Bronze	Total
1	Quebec	52	36	34	122
2	Ontario	37	35	40	112
3	Alberta	24	29	26	79
4	British Columbia	24	24	29	77
5	Saskatchewan	9	13	15	37
6	Manitoba	4	12	19	35
7	New Brunswick	2	2	8	12
8	Nova Scotia	0	3	4	7
9	Prince Edward Island	1	0	3	4
9	Yukon	1	0	3	4
11	Newfoundland and Labrador	0	1	2	3
12	Northwest Territories	1	0	0	1
13	Nunavut	0	0	1	1

==== Sports ====
- Alpine skiing
- Archery
- Artistic gymnastics
- Badminton
- Biathlon
- Boxing
- Cross country skiing
- Curling
- Fencing
- Figure skating
- Freestyle skiing
- Judo
- Ice hockey
- Ringette
- Shooting
- Speed skating
- Squash
- Synchronized swimming
- Table tennis
- Wheelchair basketball
- Snowboarding (Demonstrating sport)

=== 2009 Canada Summer Games ===
The 2009 Canada Summer Games were held in many communities in Prince Edward Island.

==== Standings ====
Rank	Province/Territory	Gold	Silver	Bronze	Total
1	Ontario	70	68	64	202
2	Quebec	42	53	50	145
3	British Columbia	57	43	44	144
4	Alberta	20	31	25	76
5	Nova Scotia	26	10	16	52
6	Saskatchewan	13	15	20	48
7	Manitoba	5	10	9	24
8	New Brunswick	1	4	2	7
9	Newfoundland and Labrador	0	4	2	6
10	Prince Edward Island	2	1	1	4
11	Yukon	2	0	2	4
12	Northwest Territories	0	0	0	0
12	Nunavut	0	0	0	0

==== Sports ====
- Athletics
- Baseball
- Basketball
- Canoe/Kayak
- Cycling
- Diving
- Golf
- Rowing
- Rugby
- Sailing
- Soccer
- Softball
- Swimming
- Tennis
- Triathlon
- Beach Volleyball
- Volleyball
- Wrestling

=== 2011 Canada Winter Games ===
The 2011 Canada Winter Games were held in Halifax, Nova Scotia.

==== Standings ====
Rank	Province/Territory	Gold	Silver	Bronze	Total
1	Quebec	51	43	43	137
2	Ontario	45	34	31	110
3	British Columbia	28	30	30	88
4	Alberta	20	25	30	75
5	Manitoba	5	7	13	25
6	Saskatchewan	7	9	7	23
7	New Brunswick	2	5	9	16
8	Nova Scotia	5	6	1	12
9	Prince Edward Island	2	0	4	6
10	Yukon	3	1	1	5
11	Newfoundland and Labrador	0	1	4	5
12	Northwest Territories	0	0	0	0
12	Nunavut	0	0	0	0

==== Sports ====
- Alpine skiing
- Archery
- Artistic gymnastics
- Badminton
- Biathlon
- Boxing
- Cross-country skiing
- Curling
- Figure skating
- Freestyle skiing
- Ice hockey
- Judo
- Ringette
- Shooting
- Short track speed skating
- Snowboarding
- Squash
- Speed skating
- Synchronized swimming
- Table tennis
- Wheelchair basketball

=== 2013 Canada Summer Games ===
The 2013 Canada Summer Games were held in Sherbrooke, Quebec.

==== Standings ====
* Host nation ( Quebec)

Rank	Nation	Gold	Silver	Bronze	Total
1	Ontario	95	69	49	213
2	Quebec*	53	58	61	172
3	British Columbia	47	36	39	122
4	Alberta	34	42	42	118
5	Nova Scotia	16	18	22	56
6	Saskatchewan	8	18	25	51
7	New Brunswick	5	5	6	16
8	Manitoba	3	11	21	35
9	Prince Edward Island	0	2	0	2
10	Newfoundland and Labrador	0	1	1	2
11	Northwest Territories	0	0	0	0
11	Nunavut	0	0	0	0
11	Yukon	0	0	0	0
Totals (13 entries)		261	260	266	787

==== Sports ====
- Aquatics
  - Diving
  - Swimming
- Athletics
- Baseball
- Basketball
- Canoeing
  - Canoe sprint
- Cycling
  - Mountain biking
  - Road
- Fencing
- Golf
- Rowing
- Sailing
- Soccer
- Softball
- Tennis
- Triathlon
- Volleyball
  - Volleyball
  - Beach volleyball
- Wrestling
  - Freestyle

=== 2015 Canada Winter Games ===
The 2015 Canada Winter Games were held in Prince George, British Columbia.

==== Standings ====
* Host nation ( British Columbia)

Rank	Team	Gold	Silver	Bronze	Total
1	Quebec	62	39	40	141
2	Ontario	46	40	24	110
3	British Columbia*	22	33	33	88
4	Alberta	14	24	37	75
5	Saskatchewan	6	8	14	28
6	Manitoba	6	3	6	15
7	New Brunswick	3	4	6	13
8	Yukon	3	1	4	8
9	Newfoundland and Labrador	2	2	0	4
10	Nova Scotia	0	2	2	4
11	Northwest Territories	0	1	0	1
12	Prince Edward Island	0	0	1	1
Totals (12 entries)		164	157	167	488

==== Sports ====
- Alpine skiing
- Archery
- Badminton
- Biathlon
- Cross-country skiing
- Curling
- Figure skating
- Freestyle skiing
- Gymnastics
  - Artistic gymnastics
  - Trampoline
- Ice hockey
- Judo
- Ringette
- Shooting
- Short track speed skating
- Speed skating
- Snowboarding
- Squash
- Synchronized swimming
- Table tennis
- Wheelchair Basketball

=== 2017 Canada Summer Games ===
The 2017 Canada Summer Games were held in Winnipeg, Manitoba.

==== Medal Standings ====
* Host nation ( Manitoba)

Rank	Nation	Gold	Silver	Bronze	Total
1	Ontario	86	65	59	210
2	British Columbia	55	49	42	146
3	Quebec	46	40	53	139
4	Alberta	26	38	34	98
5	Nova Scotia	13	21	15	49
6	Manitoba*	10	15	17	42
7	Saskatchewan	8	11	16	35
8	New Brunswick	4	9	11	24
9	Newfoundland and Labrador	0	1	0	1
9	Prince Edward Island	0	1	0	1
11	Northwest Territories	0	0	0	0
11	Nunavut	0	0	0	0
11	Yukon	0	0	0	0
Totals (13 entries)		248	250	247	745

=== 2019 Canada Winter Games ===
The 2019 Canada Winter Games were held in Red Deer, Alberta.

Rank	Team	Gold	Silver	Bronze	Total
1	Quebec	65	41	40	146
2	Alberta	36	33	31	100
3	British Columbia	30	28	29	87
4	Ontario	18	43	44	105
5	Manitoba	9	7	9	25
6	Saskatchewan	3	3	11	17
7	Nova Scotia	1	6	4	11
8	New Brunswick	1	3	5	9
9	Newfoundland and Labrador	1	0	1	2
10	Prince Edward Island	0	1	1	2
11	Northwest Territories	0	0	1	1
11	Yukon	0	0	1	1
13	Nunavut	0	0	0	0
Totals (13 entries)		164	165	177	506

=== 2022 Canada Summer Games ===
The 2022 Canada Summer Games were held in Niagara Region, Ontario.

* Host nation ( Ontario)

Rank	Team	Gold	Silver	Bronze	Total
1	Ontario*	86	60	52	198
2	Quebec	49	51	42	142
3	Alberta	35	33	43	111
4	British Columbia	34	51	43	128
5	Nova Scotia	22	15	19	56
6	Manitoba	10	10	17	37
7	New Brunswick	4	6	9	19
8	Saskatchewan	3	13	16	32
9	Newfoundland and Labrador	1	6	2	9
10	Prince Edward Island	1	0	1	2
11	Nunavut	1	0	0	1
12	Northwest Territories	0	0	0	0
12	Yukon	0	0	0	0
Totals (13 entries)		246	245	244	735

=== 2023 Canada Winter Games ===
The 2023 Canada Winter Games were held in Prince Edward Island.

* Host nation ( Prince Edward Island)

Rank	Team	Gold	Silver	Bronze	Total
1	Quebec	57	43	51	151
2	British Columbia	46	26	31	103
3	Ontario	32	43	33	108
4	Alberta	20	36	36	92
5	Nova Scotia	7	7	10	24
6	Manitoba	6	6	7	19
7	Saskatchewan	3	7	10	20
8	New Brunswick	2	4	10	16
9	Newfoundland and Labrador	2	0	2	4
10	Yukon	1	0	2	3
11	Prince Edward Island*	0	1	1	2
Totals (11 entries)		176	173	193	542

=== 2025 Canada Summer Games ===
The 2025 Canada Summer Games were held in St. John's, Newfoundland and Labrador.

* Host nation (Newfoundland and Labrador)

Rank	Team	Gold	Silver	Bronze	Total
1	Quebec	63	58	52	173
2	Ontario	63	57	55	175
3	British Columbia	43	32	41	116
4	Alberta	22	30	29	81
5	Nova Scotia	21	22	18	61
6	Saskatchewan	13	14	21	48
7	Manitoba	12	10	12	34
8	New Brunswick	5	7	5	17
9	Newfoundland and Labrador*	1	4	1	6
10	Prince Edward Island	0	1	3	4
11	Northwest Territories	0	0	0	0
11	Nunavut	0	0	0	0
11	Yukon	0	0	0	0
Totals (13 entries)		243	235	237	715
