= Chief Mountain Border Crossing =

Border crossing between Canada and the United States

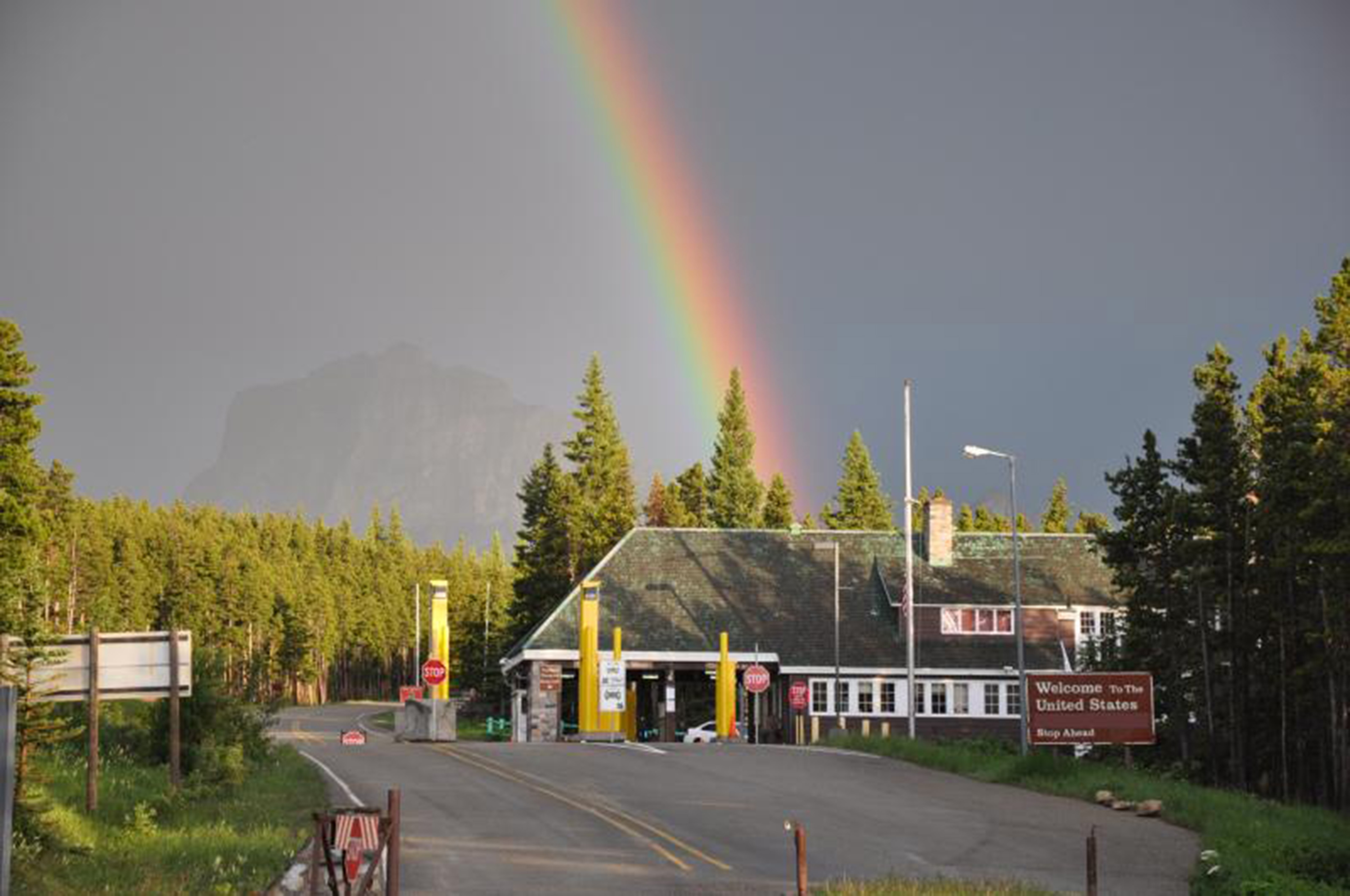
- US Border Inspection Station at Chief Mountain, MT

Location
- Country: United States; Canada
- Location: MT 17 / Highway 6 in Waterton-Glacier International Peace Park; US Port: 1400 Chief Mountain Hwy, Browning, MT 59417; Canadian Port: Highway #6, Waterton Park, AB T0K 2M0
- Coordinates: 48°59′52″N 113°39′39″W

Details
- Opened: 1936

Website
- US Canadian

The Chief Mountain Border Crossing connects the town of Babb, Montana, with Pincher Creek, Alberta, on the Canada–US border. Montana Highway 17 on the American side joins Alberta Highway 6 on the Canadian side, creating the only road border crossing within the Waterton-Glacier International Peace Park. Poker Creek–Little Gold Creek and this crossing are the only ones closed in winter. It is the westernmost border crossing in Alberta.

== Canadian side ==
The idea for this road link, which would reduce the connection between Waterton Lakes National Park (Canada) and Glacier National Park (U.S.) by about 48 kilometres (30 mi), was suggested as early as 1915. To provide employment during the Great Depression, relief work camps operated from late 1932 to 1935, by which time the highway was almost complete. Called the Kennedy Creek Cut Off or Kennedy Creek-Belly River Road during construction, the agreed name of The Chief Mountain International Highway was suggested by Herbert Legg of Canada Customs. No formal ceremony marked the opening in June 1936.

When Legg had earlier examined the proposed customs site on an uncompleted section of road, he discovered the surveyed route would create an unsatisfactory uphill grade to the boundary. In response, the engineer built the road farther down the hillside. At then the highest elevation in Canada for a customs office, snow covered the ground when it opened in a tent in May 1936. The unpaved highway became muddy during the spring thaw making travel difficult. A combined customs office/residence building was completed in 1937.

COVID-19 restrictions prevented the seasonal reopening of the crossing in 2020 and 2021.

With an elevation of 1,700 metres, it has the highest elevation of all border crossings in Canada.

== US side ==
The highway was built over 13 months between the fall of 1934 and the summer of 1936 by Montana state employees and contractors.

The Chief Mountain Border Station and Quarters, constructed in 1939, was added to the National Register of Historic Places on May 20, 2008.

== See also ==
- List of Canada–United States border crossings
