= Waterton-Glacier International Peace Park =

International park in North America

Waterton Glacier International Peace Park
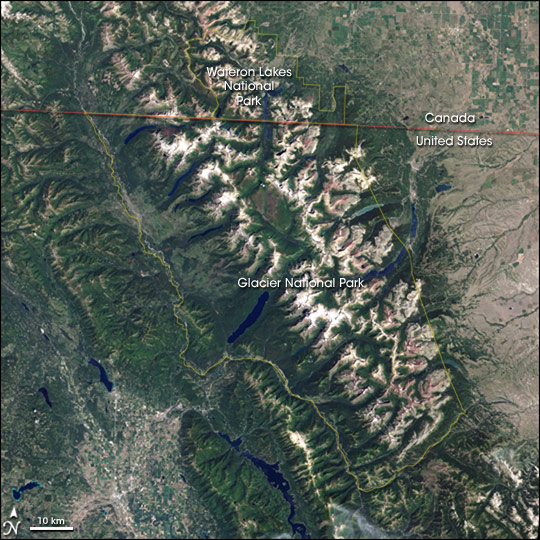
- Landsat 7 image of Waterton-Glacier International Peace Park

- Location within North America
- 49°00′00″N 113°55′00″W
- Location: Alberta, Canada and Montana, United States

History
- Formed: June 18, 1932

Site notes
- Governing body: Parks Canada, U.S. National Park Service

UNESCO World Heritage Site
- Includes: Waterton Lakes National Park; Glacier National Park
- Criteria: Natural: (vii), (ix)
- Reference: 354rev
- Inscription: 1995 (19th Session)
- Area: 457,614 ha (1,766.86 sq mi)

The Waterton-Glacier International Peace Park is the union of Waterton Lakes National Park in Canada and Glacier National Park in the United States. Both parks are declared Biosphere Reserves by UNESCO and their union as a World Heritage Site.

== History ==
=== Formation ===
The union of the Waterton Lakes National Park and the Glacier National Park is attributed to a number of individuals throughout the late 19th and early 20th centuries. Early proponents of a borderless international park include Canadian George "Kootenay" Brown, a long-time settler and first forest ranger-in-charge of Waterton, and American Albert Henry "Death-on-the-Trail" Reynolds, an early ranger of the northern portion of Glacier.

The Cardston, Alberta, and Montana Rotary Clubs played a significant role in the park's establishment, holding a joint meeting at the Prince of Wales Hotel on July 4–5, 1931, which led to a resolution drafted by Samuel H. Middleton, calling on both groups to petition the proper authorities for the establishment of the Peace Park. An agreement was subsequently negotiated by Canadian Brigadier-General John Smith Stewart, Member of Parliament for Lethbridge, and American congressman from Montana Scott Leavitt. The 72nd United States Congress passed An Act to establish Waterton Glacier International Peace Park on December 8, 1931, and be approved by the United States Senate in March 1932. The Canadian federal government decided to wait until after the United States government had passed a bill in order to act, and the Canadian bill was further delayed by protests of proponents of the International Peace Garden between Manitoba and North Dakota. Finally, John Stewart's Act respecting the Waterton-Glacier International Peace Park was passed by Parliament, and given royal assent on May 26, 1932.

The union of the parks was achieved through the efforts of Rotary International members from Alberta and Montana, on June 18, 1932, at Glacier Park Lodge. The dedication address was given by Sir Charles Arthur Mander, 2nd Baronet. The ceremony for the Canadian side was delayed by the Great Depression, and finally took place in July 1936, with Lieutenant Governor of Alberta William L. Walsh overseeing the ceremony and dedicating a cairn for conservation advocate Kootenay Brown.

=== Later history ===
The two parks are administered separately and have separate entrance fees.

In 2007, the International Dark-Sky Association named Waterton-Glacier International Peace Park the International Dark-Sky Park.

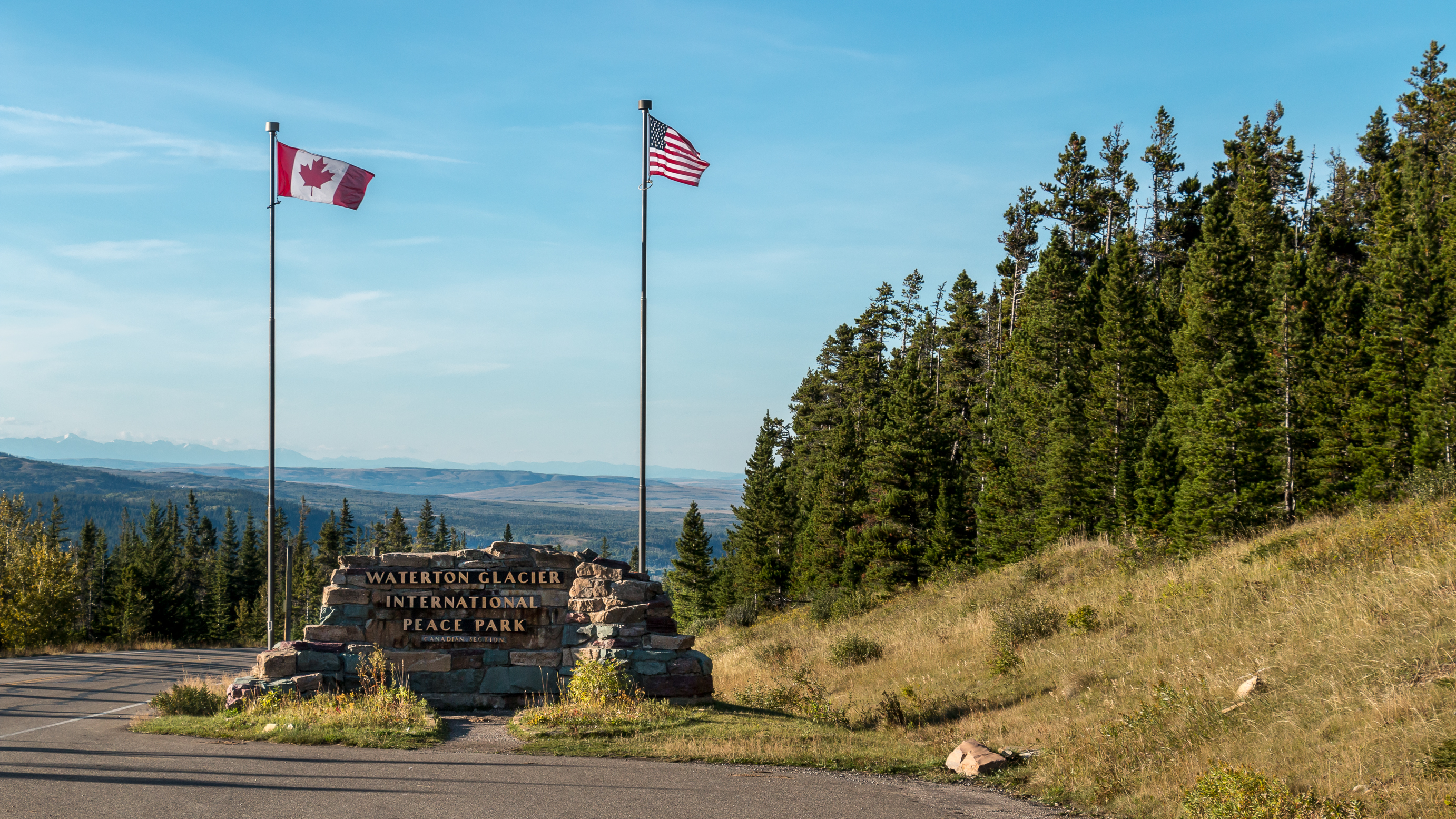
The park's sign at the Chief Mountain border crossing.

== Border crossing ==
The Chief Mountain Border Crossing, reached by Montana Highway 17 from the American side and by Alberta Highway 6 from the Canadian side, is the only road border crossing within the Waterton-Glacier International Peace Park. It is one of only two on the US–Canada border that are closed in winter (Poker Creek - Little Gold Creek Border Crossing is the other).

Visitors can temporarily cross the border at certain points without undergoing a passport check.
