= Ruth Collins-Nakai =

Canadian cardiologist

Ruth L. Collins-Nakai CM (born March 27, 1949) is a retired Canadian cardiologist, educator, researcher, physician leader, healthcare advisor, and public health advocate.

== Education ==
She was born in Pincher Creek, Alberta, the second of four children of physician parents Lorne and Rhonda (Boughton) Collins. Collins-Nakai completed her undergraduate and medical degrees at the University of Alberta (MD 1972), followed by an internship at McGill University (1972–73), a pediatrics residency and fellowship at the University of Alberta (1973–74 and 1976–77, respectively), and a pediatric cardiology fellowship at Harvard Medical School, (1974–76). She later obtained a Master's of Business Administration from the University of Alberta (MBA 1998).

== Career ==
After completing her fellowships, Collins-Nakai was offered a position as assistant professor of pediatrics at the University of Alberta Hospital. She initiated the Heritage Pediatric Cardiology Program in 1978, with outreach clinics in smaller urban centres, and this evolved to become the Western Canadian Congenital Heart Program. In addition, she was associate professor of pediatrics (1980–88) and Professor of Pediatrics (1988–2000) at the University of Alberta, the Director of the Pediatric Cardiology Training program (1990–93) and Associate Dean in the Faculty of Medicine (1993–96).

Her main research interests were congenital heart disease, epidemiology, and cardiac metabolism. Over the course of her career, she co-authored a number of preclinical and clinical research articles in cardiology, and was the sole author for opinion pieces on various aspects of healthcare, in highly ranked scientific journals.

Her public health efforts included advocating for research into early child development as well as seatbelt legislation and the banning of smoking on commercial airlines.

Following retirement from academia in 2001 and clinical practice in 2009, she has contributed to philanthropic endeavours and done consulting work in healthcare, research, and post-secondary education, and for biotechnology companies.

== Leadership roles ==
Collins-Nakai filled roles on provincial, national, and international organizations, which included President of the Alberta Cardiovascular Society, Commissioner on the Premier's Commission on Future Health Care for Albertans, President of the Alberta Medical Association (first woman), and President of the Canadian Cardiovascular Society (first woman, 1999–2002). Collins-Nakai was the fourth female president of the Canadian Medical Association (2005–2006). She was the first Canadian and first woman to become chair of the Board of Governors of the American College of Cardiology and to be the president of the Inter-American Society of Cardiology. She was a founding member of the governing council of the Canadian Institutes of Health Research and also chaired the scientific advisory panel of the Canadian Coordinating Office for Health Technology Assessment. She has served many roles in the Muttart Foundation, including two terms as president.

== Honours ==
Collins-Nakai received Teacher of the Year Pediatrics awards at the University of Alberta in 1988 and 1997. In 2001, she was honoured with the International Academy of Cardiovascular Sciences Distinguished Achievement Award for promoting cardiovascular education and research throughout the world. She was selected in 2005 as one of Canada's Most Powerful Women: Top 100 Award in the category of Professional by WXN (Women's Executive Network), Toronto. In 2006, she was bestowed with a Distinguished Honor from the American College of Cardiology: Master of the American College of Cardiology (MACC) and she received the Alberta Centennial Medal, in recognition of achievements and contributions to her community. In 2007, the YWCA conferred on her a Women of Distinction Lois E Hole Lifetime Achievement Award and the College of Physicians and Surgeons of Alberta recognized her with a Certificate for Meritorious Service.

In 2008, she was the 38th person to receive the Canadian Medical Association Medal of Service and that same year she also received Grant MacEwan College's (now MacEwan University) Distinguished Citizen of the Year award. In 2009, she was inducted into the City of Edmonton's Hall of Fame (Community Service) and in 2012 she received the Queen Elizabeth ll Diamond Jubilee Medal. She was appointed Honorary Lt Colonel for 1 Field Ambulance, Canadian Forces in 2013, was promoted to Honorary Colonel in 2019, and stepped down from that role in 2023, receiving the Canadian Health Services Command Commendation. She was given an Annual Achievement Award by the Canadian Cardiovascular Society in 2015. She received the Order of Canada on November 18, 2016. In 2021, she was conferred an honorary Doctor of Science degree from the University of Alberta. She received an honorary doctorate degree from the University of Lethbridge in 2022 and from MacEwan University in 2024.

== Personal life ==
She was married to Dr Someshwar Singh Nakai for 46 years until his death in December 2021. They have a daughter and a son.
