= St. Patrick's Park =

Baseball park in St. John's, Newfoundland

Coordinates: 47°34′25.91″N 52°42′45.63″W

- St. Pat's
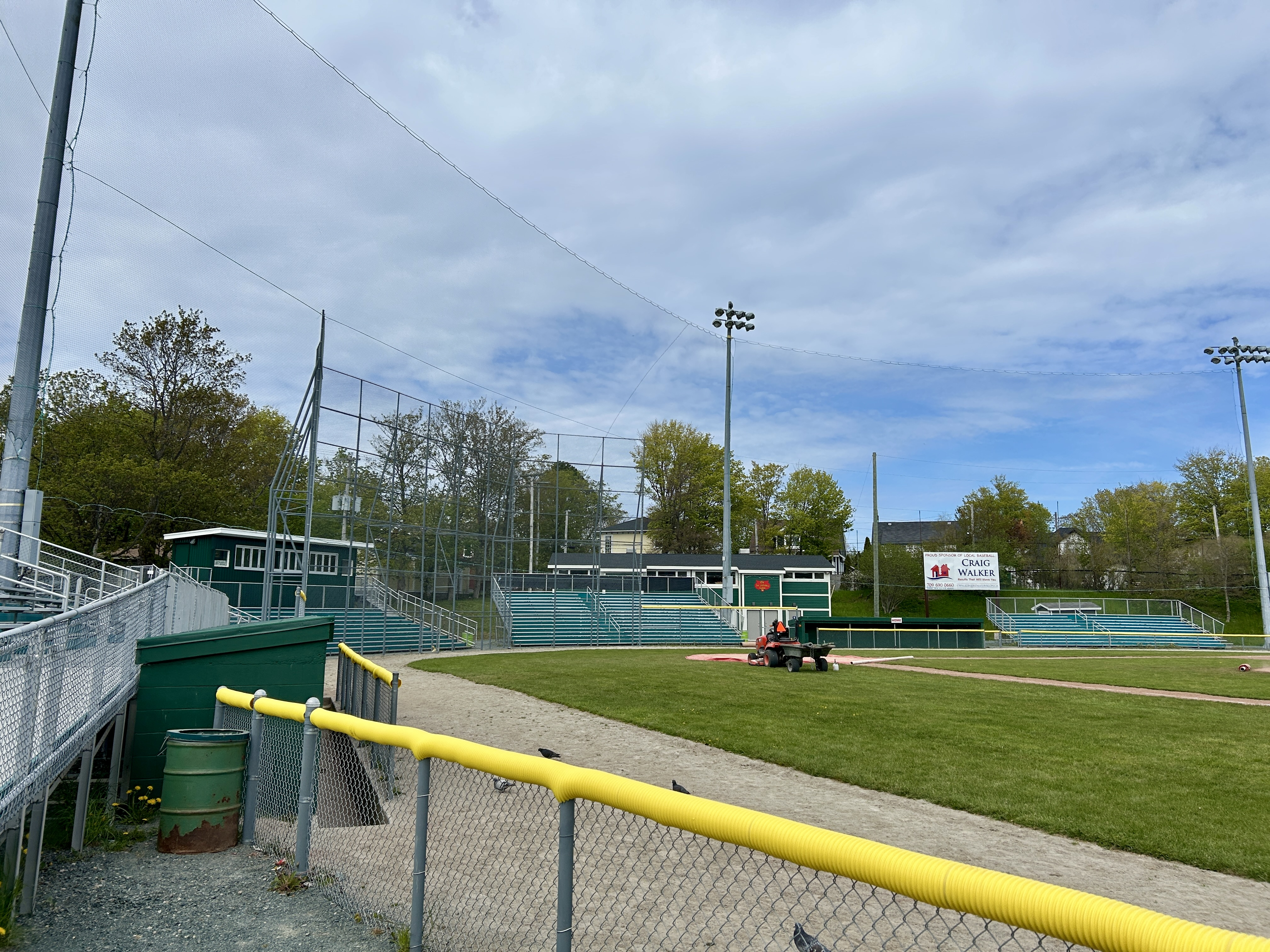
- Interactive map of St. Patrick's Park
- Location: Corner of Carpasian Road and Empire Avenue
- Owner: St. John's, Newfoundland and Labrador
- Operator: St. John's Amateur Baseball Association
- Capacity: 1,000
- Surface: Grass and Clay
- Field size: Left Field - 290 ft Center Field - 355 ft Right Field - 306 ft

Tenant
- St John’s Amateur Baseball

St. Patrick's Park (also called St. Pat's Ball Park) is the largest baseball park in the province of Newfoundland and Labrador. It is located in St. John's, Newfoundland and was built by American servicemen stationed in the province following the Second World War. It hosted baseball at the 1977 Canada Games, 2025 Canada Games and the Baseball Canada 2014 Senior Men's Canada Championships.

The park is currently run and used by St. John's Amateur Baseball Association for their senior and intermediate baseball leagues. The senior league currently has 5 teams: Holy Cross Crusaders, Feildians AA, Shamrocks, Gonzaga Vikings and The Knights. The intermediate league consists of Holy Cross Crusaders, Feildians AA, Shamrocks, Gonzaga Vikings, Knights, Generals.

St. Pat's is also home to both the senior and junior St. John's Capitals, which is the selects team for the St. John's Amateur Baseball Association.
