= Castle Mountain Resort =

Ski resort in Alberta, Canada

- Location within Alberta Location within Canada
- Location: Municipal District of Pincher Creek No. 9, Alberta, Canada
- Nearest city: Pincher Creek, Lethbridge
- Coordinates: 49°19′01″N 114°25′49″W
- Vertical: 853 m (2,799 ft)
- Top elevation: 2,377 m (7,799 ft)
- Base elevation: 1,453 m (4,767 ft)
- Skiable area: 3500+ acres
- Trails: 94+
- Longest run: 5 km (3.1 mi)
- Lift system: 7 (5 chairlifts, 1 T-bar, 1 carpet lift)
- Terrain parks: 2, 1 beginner park, 1 big hit park
- Snowfall: 8.5 m (28 ft)
- Snowmaking: Yes
- Night skiing: No
- Website: Castle Mountain Resort

Castle Mountain is a ski resort located in the Westcastle Valley of southwest Alberta, Canada in the Rocky Mountains. It is approximately 260 kilometres (160 mi) from Calgary and the Calgary International Airport; 140 kilometres (87 mi) from Lethbridge; and 50 kilometres (31 mi) west of Pincher Creek. The resort is renowned for long steep runs and an average 8.5 metres (28 ft) of snowfall yearly.

Despite the name, Castle Mountain Resort is not actually on Castle Mountain, which is about 240 kilometres (150 mi) away within Banff National Park. The name is derived from the Castle Rivers, and the nearby Windsor Mountain. Windsor Mountain was originally named by the Blakiston group of the Palliser Expedition as Castle Mountain, within days of the naming of the Banff peak by the Palliser group of the Palliser Expedition. The name was changed to Windsor Mountain due to its shape and visible 'towers', which are still named as the Castle Peaks, which resemble Windsor Castle.

The resort maintains 94 ski trails including 8 alpine bowls, with 10% beginner, 30% intermediate, 40% advanced, 20% expert terrain. Six lift systems with vertical rises from 445 to 50 m with the highest vertical being 863 m, are operated on the slopes of Mount Haig and Gravenstafel Ridge.

Castle Mountain Resort was opened in 1966. It was the site of the 1975 Canada Winter Games.
