= Brookvale Provincial Park =

Provincial park in Prince Edward Island, Canada

Coordinates: 46°16′50″N 63°24′35″W

Brookvale Provincial Ski Park, officially Mark Arendz Provincial Ski Park, is a provincial park in Prince Edward Island, Canada.

It is located in Brookvale and functions as a winter activity park with the following attractions:

- alpine ski hill (the only facility in the province)
- nordic ski and snowshoeing trails
- mountain biking trails (spring, summer, fall)

The facility hosted multiple events as part of the 2023 Canada Winter Games. Ahead of the games, 6.2 million dollars (USD4.7 million) was spent renovating and updating the facilities.

The park was renamed in 2018 to celebrate Island athlete Mark Arendz and his success in the 2018 Paralympic Winter Games in South Korea.
