= Chief Mountain, Alberta =

Unincorporated community in Alberta, Canada

Coordinates: 49°03′00″N 113°54′00″W

Location of Chief Mountain, Alberta

Chief Mountain is an unincorporated community in southern Alberta in Improvement District No. 4, on Highway 6, 105 kilometres (65 mi) southwest of Lethbridge. It serves as a port of entry into the U.S. state of Montana.

== See also ==
- Chief Mountain Border Crossing
