= Gravenstafel Ridge =

Coordinates: 49.31667°N 114.43529°W

Gravenstafel Ridge is a ridge in Alberta, Canada.

The ridge takes its name from Gravenstafel ridge, in Belgium. It is near to Mount Haig.
