= Alberta Highway 6 =

Highway in Alberta, Canada

Highway 6
- Highway 6 highlighted in red

Route information
- Maintained by the Ministry of Transportation and Economic Corridors
- Length: 73.5 km (45.7 mi)

Major junctions
- South end: MT 17 at the U.S. border near Chief Mountain
- Highway 5 in Waterton Lakes National Park
- North end: Highway 3 near Pincher Creek

Location
- Country: Canada
- Province: Alberta
- Specialized and rural municipalities: I.D. No. 4, Cardston County, Pincher Creek No. 9 M.D.
- Towns: Pincher Creek

Highway system
- Alberta Numbered Highway Network; List; Former
| ← Highway 5 | → Highway 7 |

Highway 6 is a north–south highway in southern Alberta, Canada. It spans approximately 74 kilometres (46 mi) from Alberta's border with Montana to Highway 3 (Crowsnest Highway).

Highway 6 is part of the Cowboy Trail between Highway 5 in Waterton Lakes National Park and the Crowsnest Highway, where the Cowboy Trail follows Highway 3 to Highway 22 and continues north.

== Route description ==
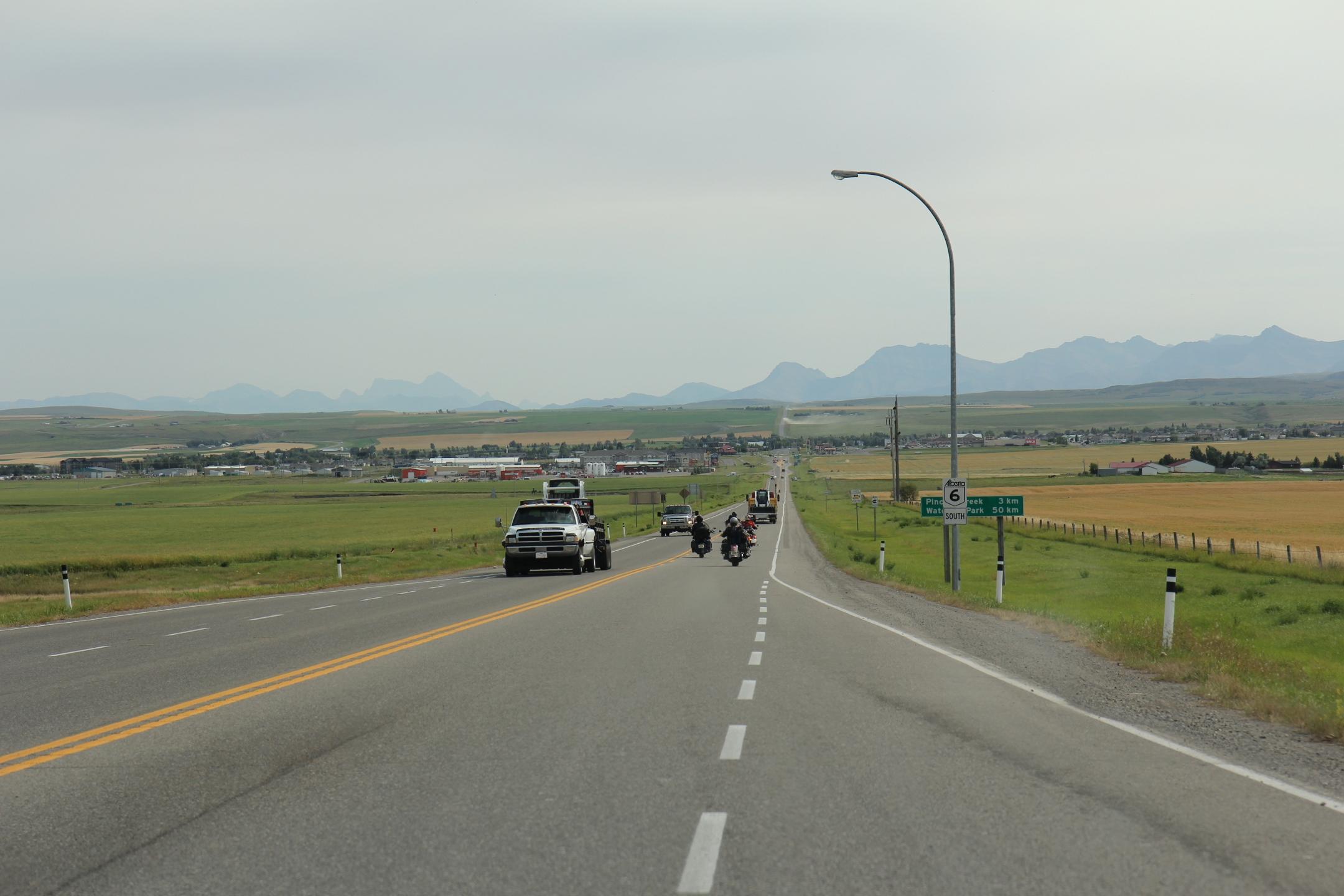
Looking south from northern terminus

Montana Highway 17 in Glacier National Park becomes Alberta Highway 6 in Waterton Lakes National Park as it crosses the Canada–United States border at Chief Mountain. Generally travelling in a north direction from Chief Mountain, the highway provides access to the Hamlet of Waterton Park via Highway 5, and passes through the Hamlet of Twin Butte and the Town of Pincher Creek. Highway 6 ends at Highway 3 north of Pincher Creek.

The Chief Mountain border crossing, at the highway's southern end, is Canada's highest border crossing at an elevation of 1,722 m (5,649 ft). It is closed each year for winter and typically reopens on May 15, closing again on September 30.

== Major intersections ==
The following is a list of major intersections along Alberta Highway 6 from south to north.

| Rural/specialized municipality | Location | km | mi | Destinations | Notes |
|---|---|---|---|---|---|
| I.D. No. 4 (Waterton Lakes; National Park) | Chief Mountain | 0.0 | 0.0 | MT 17 south – Glacier National Park | Continues into Montana |
| I.D. No. 4 (Waterton Lakes; National Park) | Chief Mountain | 0.0 | 0.0 | Canada–United States border at Chief Mountain Border Crossing | |
| I.D. No. 4 (Waterton Lakes; National Park) | | 22.0 | 13.7 | Highway 5 east – Cardston, Lethbridge | South end of Highway 5 concurrency and Cowboy Trail |
| I.D. No. 4 (Waterton Lakes; National Park) | | 22.9 | 14.2 | Highway 5 west – Waterton Park | North end of Highway 5 concurrency |
| M.D. of Pincher Creek No. 9 | | 49.2 | 30.6 | Highway 505 east – Glenwood | |
| Pincher Creek | | 69.3 | 43.1 | Main Street (Highway 507 east) | South end of Highway 507 concurrency |
| Pincher Creek | | 69.7 | 43.3 | Macleod Street (Highway 785 north) | |
| Pincher Creek | | 70.6 | 43.9 | Highway 507 west / Hewetson Avenue south – Beaver Mines, Castle Mountain | Roundabout; north end of Highway 507 concurrency |
| M.D. of Pincher Creek No. 9 | Pincher Station | 73.5 | 45.7 | Highway 3 (Crowsnest Highway) – Crowsnest Pass, Fort Macleod, Lethbridge | Interchange proposed; Cowboy Trail follows Highway 3 west to Highway 22 |
1.000 mi = 1.609 km; 1.000 km = 0.621 mi: Concurrency terminus; Route transition
