= Montana Highway 17 =

State highway in Montana, United States

Montana Highway 17
- Chief Mountain Highway
- MT 17 highlighted in red

Route information
- Length: 14.082 mi (22.663 km)
- Restrictions: Border crossing open seasonally

Major junctions
- West end: Highway 6 at the Canadian border near Chief Mountain
- East end: US 89 north of Babb

Location
- Country: United States
- State: Montana
- Counties: Glacier

Highway system
- Montana Highway System; Interstate; US; State; Secondary
← MT 16	→ MT 18

Montana Highway 17 (MT 17) is a 14-mile-long (23 km) highway near the Canada–United States border. The highway begins at the Chief Mountain Border Station and Quarters where it continues north into Alberta as Highway 6. The highway winds to the southeast and ends at U.S. Highway 89 (US 89) north of Babb. The road is known as Chief Mountain Highway due to its proximity to Chief Mountain, a prominent peak in the Rocky Mountains.

== Route description ==
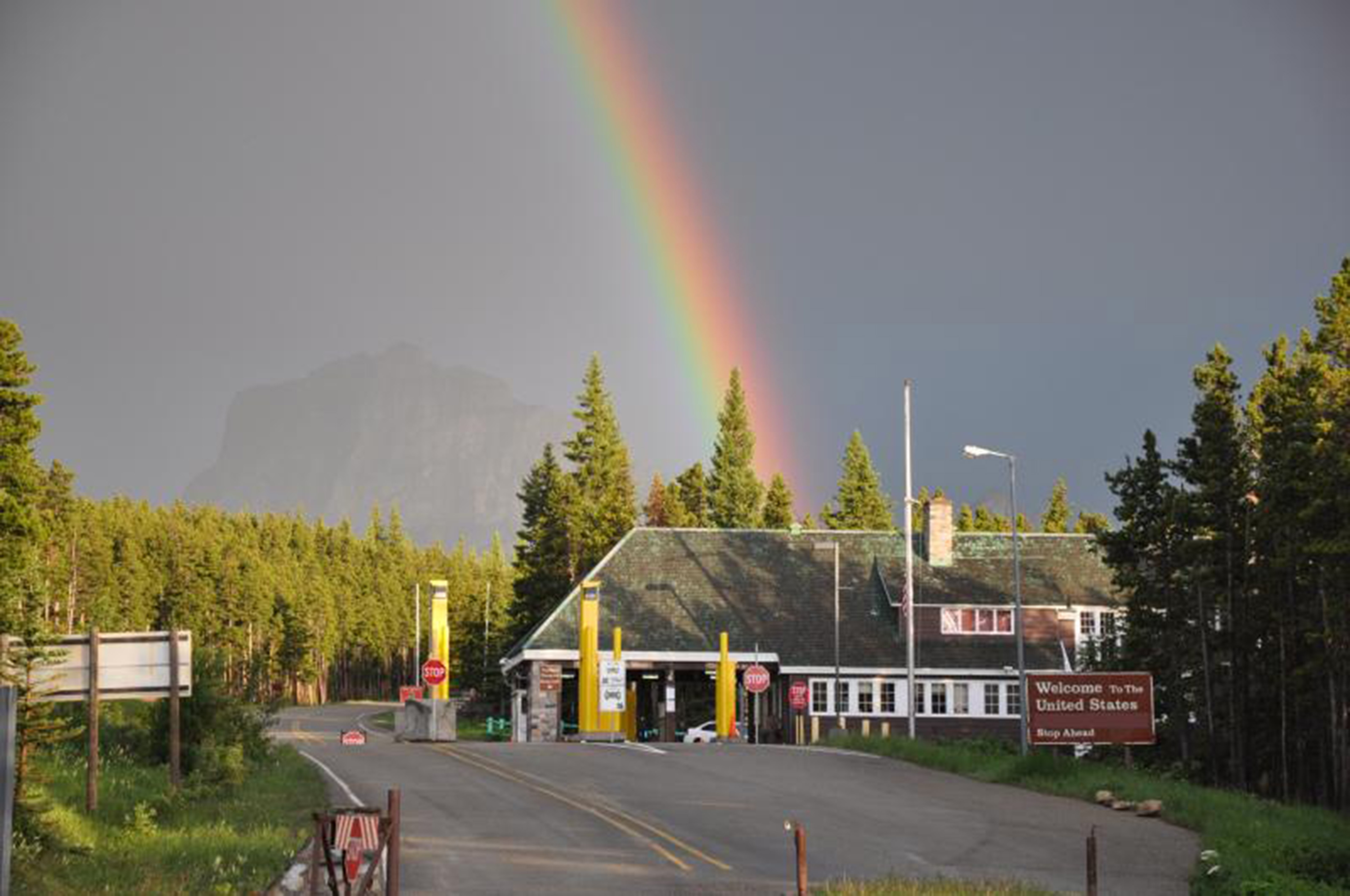
The Chief Mountain Border Station and the eponymous mountain

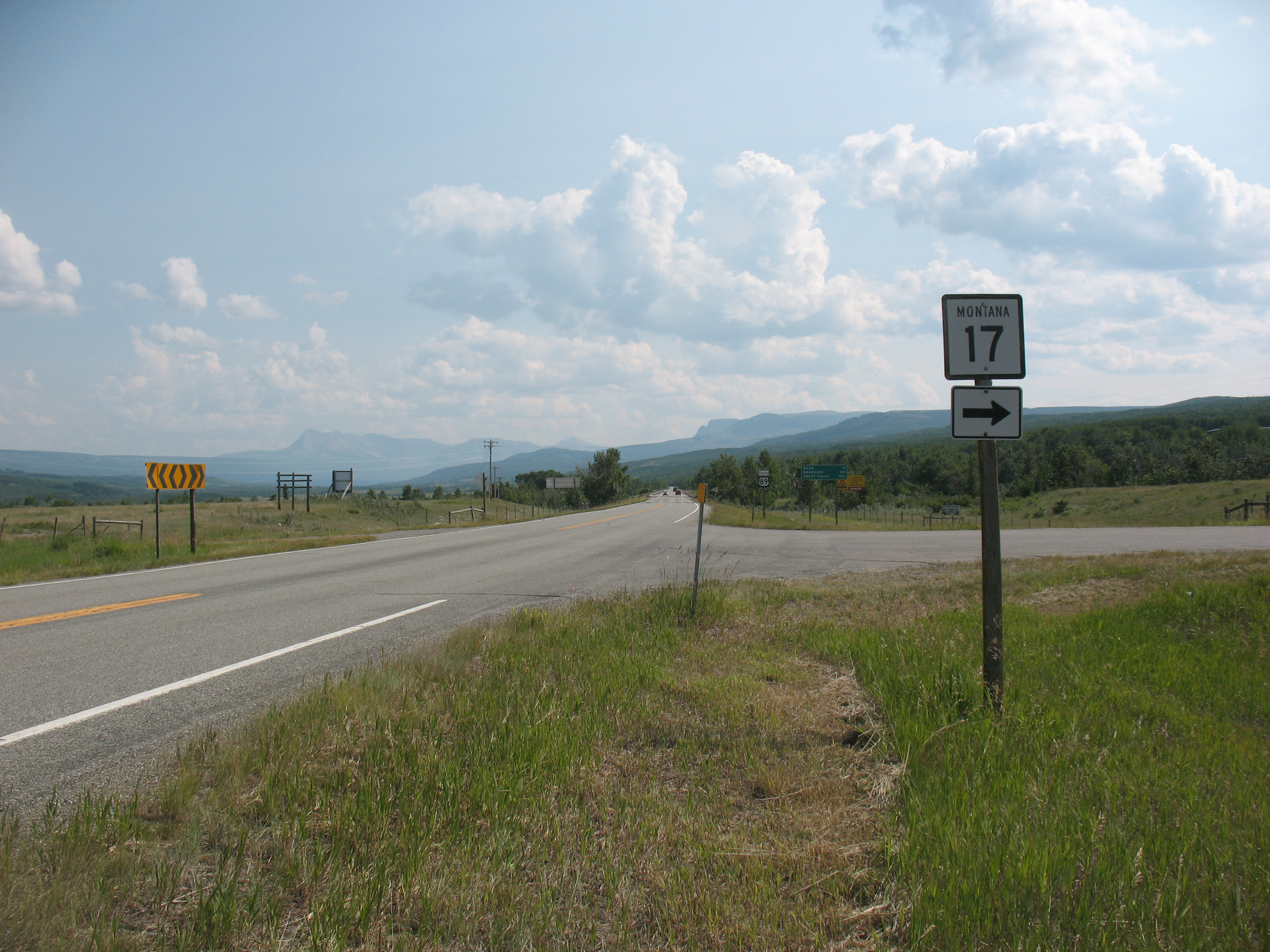
The terminus of MT 17 at US 89

MT 17 begins along the Canada–United States border at the Chief Mountain Border Station and Quarters. On the Canadian side of the border, the road continues as Alberta Highway 6. The first 3 1/3 miles (5.4 km) of the route lie within Glacier National Park. As the road winds through the coniferous forest, Chief Mountain dominates the landscape. The road continues southeast outside of the park boundary for nearly 11 miles (18 km). Scenic viewpoints provide people traveling the road an opportunity to photograph the mountains. The road ends at US 89 a few miles north of Babb.

The road is classified by the Montana Department of Transportation (MDT) as an "off-system route", meaning that while it is a numbered highway within the state highway system, it is not designated as a primary or secondary road for funding eligibility. As such, MT 17 is not maintained by MDT.

== Major intersections ==
The entire route is in Glacier County.

Location	mi	km	Destinations	Notes
Canada–United States border	0.000	0.000	Highway 6 north – Waterton Lakes	Continuation into Alberta
Canada–United States border	0.000	0.000	Chief Mountain Border Station and Quarters	
	14.082	22.663	US 89 – St. Mary, Cardston	
1.000 mi = 1.609 km; 1.000 km = 0.621 mi

== See also ==
- List of state highways in Montana
