= Mount Haig =

Mountain in the country of Canada

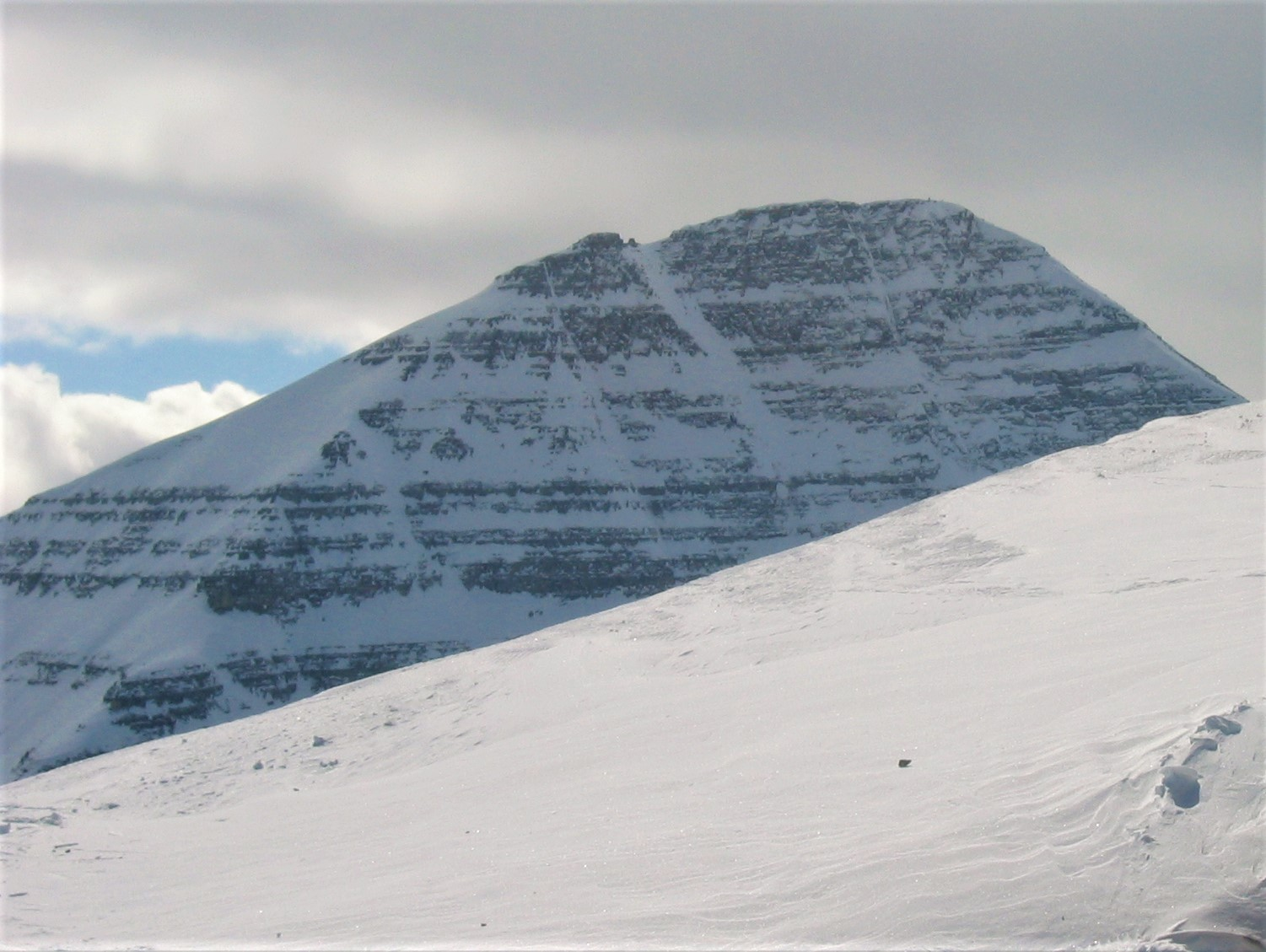
- North aspect from Castle Mountain Resort ski area

Highest point
- Elevation: 2,610 m (8,560 ft)
- Prominence: 685 m (2,247 ft)
- Listing: Mountains of Alberta; Mountains of British Columbia
- Coordinates: 49°17′20″N 114°26′50″W

Geography
- Location within Alberta Location within British Columbia Location within Canada
- Interactive map of Mount Haig
- Country: Canada
- Provinces: Alberta and British Columbia
- Parent range: Clark Range
- Topo map: NTS 82G7 Flathead Ridge

Mount Haig is located on the border of Alberta and British Columbia on the Continental Divide. It was named in 1862 after Haig, Captain R.W. Mount Haig is the highest peak of Gravenstafel Ridge; its lower north and east faces feature as back country cat skiing for Castle Mountain Resort on neighbouring Gravenstafel Mountain.

== Geology ==
Mount Haig is composed of sedimentary rock laid down during the Precambrian to Jurassic periods. Formed in shallow seas, this sedimentary rock was pushed east and over the top of younger Cretaceous period rock during the Laramide orogeny.

== Climate ==
Based on the Köppen climate classification, Mount Haig is located in a subarctic climate with cold, snowy winters, and mild summers. Winter temperatures can drop below −20 °C with wind chill factors below −30 °C.

== Gallery ==
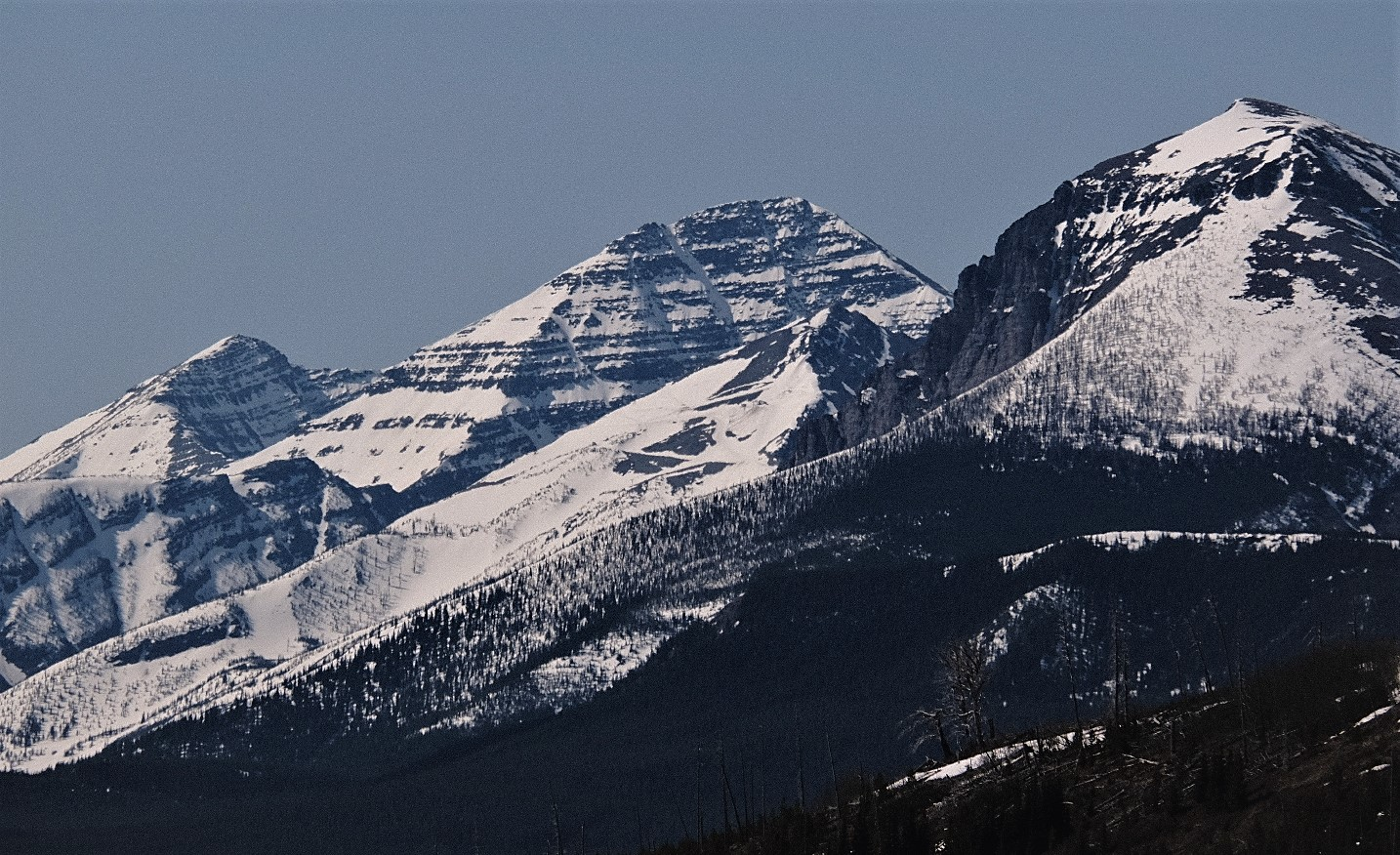
Mount Haig centered, north aspect

== See also ==
- List of peaks on the British Columbia–Alberta border
