= Interamerican Society of Cardiology =

Heart disease organization

The Interamerican Society of Cardiology (SIAC for its Spanish acronym) is a nongovernmental association formed by the National Societies of Cardiology of the American Continent. The Interamerican Society of Cardiology, together with the European Society of Cardiology, founded in 1950, the Asian Pacific Society of Cardiology, founded in 1956, and the African Society of Cardiology founded in 1981 are the four Intercontinental Professional Societies of Cardiology of the World Heart Federation (WHF for its acronym in English). It is comprised 28 national professional cardiology societies with more than 40,000 cardiologists from the Americas and Spain.

== History ==
The Interamerican Society of Cardiology (SIAC) was founded in Mexico on 18 April 1944, at the initiative of Doctor Ignacio Chávez. That year, the occasion being the inauguration of the National Institute of Cardiology in Mexico City its founder and director, Dr. Ignacio Chávez, invited distinguished cardiologists from North, Central and South America and the Caribbean to the ceremony.

After a fruitful exchange of ideas at this meeting, it was concluded that, in fact, the event had actually constituted an Interamerican Congress and the suggestion was to acknowledge it as such. Those attending did so and decided to form the Interamerican Society of Cardiology and to recognize the event as the first Interamerican Congress of Cardiology. It was also decided to delegate upon Dr. Chavez the task of drawing up the articles of incorporation and bylaws of the Society, and he was requested to convene another Interamerican Congress of Cardiology in Mexico City when World War II ended. Dr. Ignacio Chavez was unanimously elected as President of the Interamerican Society of Cardiology.

== Mission ==
The main purpose of the Society is to group together the Societies of Cardiology of all the countries of the Americas for the advancement of cardiology, to promote research, teaching and the association of physicians, surgeons, and researchers specialized in this field. It also strives to promote optimal cardiovascular health in the population of the Americas through the education and ongoing professional development of its members.

== Vision ==
To unite the Cardiovascular Societies representing all the countries of the Americas in order to facilitate the advancement of cardiovascular science, by:

1. Promoting research and exchange.
2. Supporting graduate level education and ongoing professional development.
3. Granting value to being a member of the "Society - SIAC".

== General Assembly ==
At present there are 26 national professional societies of cardiology members of SIAC forming the General Assembly to bring together more than 40,000 cardiologists.

- Argentina: Argentine Society of Cardiology / Argentine Federation of Cardiology / Argentine Council of Residents of Cardiology
- Bolivia: Bolivian Society of Cardiology
- Brazil: Brazilian Society of Cardiology
- Canada: Canadian Cardiovascular Society
- Caribbean: Caribbean Cardiac Society
- Colombia: Colombian Society of Cardiology and Cardiovascular Surgery
- Costa Rica: Costa Rican Association of Cardiology
- Cuba: Cuban Society of Cardiology
- Chile: Chilean Society of Cardiology and Cardiovascular Surgery
- Dominican Republic: Dominican Society of Cardiology
- Ecuador: Ecuadorian Society of Cardiology
- USA: American Heart Association / American College of Cardiology
- Guatemala: Guatemalan Heart Association
- Honduras: Honduran Society of Cardiology
- Mexico: Mexican Society of Cardiology / National Association of Cardiologists of Mexico
- Nicaragua: Nicaraguan Association of Cardiologists
- Panama: Panamanian Society of Cardiology
- Paraguay: Paraguayan Society of Cardiology
- Peru: Peruvian Society of Cardiology
- Puerto Rico: Puerto Rican Society of Cardiology
- El Salvador: Salvadoran Association of Cardiology
- Uruguay: Uruguayan Society of Cardiology
- Venezuela: Venezuelan Society of Cardiology

== Administrative office ==
Since the founding of the SIAC and according to the bylaws in force, the Secretary-Treasurer is permanently based at the National Institute of Cardiology in Mexico City.

== Interamerican Congress ==
The Interamerican Congress of Cardiology is held every two years in a country of the American continent. The XXIV Interamerican Congress of Cardiology held from the 18th to 20 October 2013 in Buenos Aires, Argentina, had 9946 attendees, including cardiologists, teachers and students, of which 781 were foreigners from 22 different countries.

The XXV Interamerican Congress of Cardiology will take place from the 4th to 7 December 2015 in Santiago de Chile. At the last General Assembly the city of São Paulo, Brazil was approved as host of the XXVI Interamerican Congress of Cardiology to be held in 2017.

== Councils ==
The Interamerican Society of Cardiology currently has the following associations and scientific Councils:

- Association of Echocardiography of the SIAC (EcoSIAC)
- Council of Cardiomyopathies and Chagas Disease
- Council of Electrocardiography and Electrophysiology
- Alliance Against Sudden Cardiac Death
- Council of Epidemiology
- Council of Rheumatic Fever
