= 2023 Canada Winter Games =

Multi-sports competition

- XXVIII Canada Games
- Host city: Prince Edward Island
- Country: Canada
- Teams: 13
- Athletes: 3,600
- Sport: 21
- Events: 175
- Opening: February 18, 2023
- Closing: March 5, 2023
- Torch lighter: Mark Arendz
- Main venue: Eastlink Centre
- Website: 2023 Canada Winter Games

Winter

The 2023 Canada Winter Games, officially known as the XXVIII Canada Games, (or informally as PEI 2023) was a Canadian multi-sport event hosted mainly across Prince Edward Island, from February 18, 2023, to March 5, 2023. The skiing events were hosted in New Brunswick, and the (long track) speed skating events were held in Nova Scotia.

== Bidding ==
As part of the rotation of Canada Games hosts, the Northwest Territories with (Yellowknife) were scheduled to host the games for the first time ever. However, in September 2016, The Northwest Territories and Prince Edward Island agreed to swap bidding years (with the former now eligible to bid for 2031). In November 2018, the island officially won its bid to host the games.

== Venues ==
A total of 18 venues (16 in Prince Edward Island, one each in Nova Scotia and New Brunswick) staged the competitions. The venue in New Brunswick was chosen to host the alpine and freestyle skiing events, as there is no downhill mountain available in Prince Edward Island. Meanwhile, the speed skating oval in Nova Scotia from the 2011 Canada Winter Games was used as there were no suitable facilities in Prince Edward Island.

=== New Brunswick ===
Venue	Sport(s)	City
Crabbe Mountain	Alpine skiing Freestyle skiing	Bright Parish

=== Nova Scotia ===
Venue	Sport(s)	City
Halifax Oval	Speed skating	Halifax

=== Prince Edward Island ===
Venue	Sport(s)	City
Canada Games Multi Sport Dome at Credit Union Place	Boxing; Karate	Summerside
Cavendish Farms Community Events Centre	Hockey	Tyne Valley
Cavendish Farms Wellness Centre	Ringette	Montague
Chi-Wan Young Sports Centre	Badminton; Wheelchair basketball	Charlottetown
Credit Union Place	Hockey	Summerside
Eastlink Centre	Archery; Ceremonies; Fencing; Gymnastics (trampoline); Hockey; Squash	Charlottetown
Eliyahu Wellness Centre at Canada Games Place	Figure skating Short track speed skating	North Rustico
Evangeline Recreation Centre	Hockey	Wellington
MacLauchlan Arena	Hockey; Ringette	Charlottetown
Mark Arendz Provincial Ski Park	Alpine skiing Biathlon; Cross-country skiing Freestyle skiing Snowboarding	Brookvale
Montague Curling Club	Curling	Montague
Norton Diamond Soccer Complex	Gymnastics (artistic)	Stratford
O'Leary Cavendish Farms Arena	Hockey	O'Leary
Prince Edward Island Convention Centre	Judo; Table tennis	Charlottetown
The Silver Fox Entertainment Complex	Curling	Summerside
Tignish Credit Union Arena	Hockey	Tignish

== Sports ==
A total of 175 events in 21 sports will be contested at the games. An initial group of sports was named on January 19, 2017. The sports of karate was selected by the organizing committee as the final sport. Fencing (for the first time since 2013) and table tennis were added later by the CGC, after artistic swimming was moved to the summer sports program. Women's boxing, mixed doubles curling and karate will make their Canada Games debut.

- Alpine skiing (12)
- Archery (6)
- Badminton (6)
- Biathlon (8)
- Boxing (7)
- Cross-country skiing (19)
- Curling (3)
- Fencing (7)
- Figure skating (8)
- Freestyle skiing (11)
- Gymnastics
  - Artistic gymnastics (14)
  - Trampoline (5)
- Hockey (2)
- Judo (16)
- Karate (8)
- Ringette (1)
- Short track speed skating (10)
- Snowboarding (8)
- Speed skating (12)
- Squash (4)
- Table tennis (7)
- Wheelchair basketball (1)

== Participating provinces and territories ==
All 13 of Canada's provinces and territories competed.

- Alberta
- British Columbia
- Manitoba
- New Brunswick
- Newfoundland and Labrador
- Northwest Territories
- Nova Scotia
- Nunavut
- Ontario
- Prince Edward Island
- Quebec
- Saskatchewan
- Yukon

== Marketing ==
=== Mascot ===
Wowkwis (whoa-quis; red fox) is the 2023 Canada Games mascot.

== Medal standings ==
* Host nation ( Prince Edward Island)

Rank	Team	Gold	Silver	Bronze	Total
1	Quebec	57	43	51	151
2	British Columbia	46	26	31	103
3	Ontario	32	43	33	108
4	Alberta	20	36	36	92
5	Nova Scotia	7	7	10	24
6	Manitoba	6	6	7	19
7	Saskatchewan	3	7	10	20
8	New Brunswick	2	4	10	16
9	Newfoundland and Labrador	2	0	2	4
10	Yukon	1	0	2	3
11	Prince Edward Island*	0	1	1	2
Totals (11 entries)		176	173	193	542
