= 2025 Canada Summer Games =

Multi-sport competition

- Logo of the 2025 Canada Summer Games
- Host city: St. John's, Newfoundland and Labrador
- Motto: Ready to Rock
- Provinces and Territories: 13
- Athletes: 4,000+
- Events: 240 in 17 sports (19 disciplines)
- Opening: August 9
- Closing: August 24
- Main venue: Mary Brown's Centre; Fortis Canada Games Complex
- Website: Official website

Summer

Winter

The 2025 Canada Summer Games (French: 2025 Jeux du Canada), known informally as St. John's 2025, was a national multi-sport event celebrated in the tradition of the Canada Games, as governed by Canada Games Council (CGC). The Games were held August 9 to 24, 2025 in St. John's, Newfoundland and Labrador. These games were the 15th edition of the Summer Games, and 30th overall. These were the third Canada Games hosted by Newfoundland and Labrador (1977 and 1999), and the second in the city of St. John's (1977). The Games were held at venues in St. John's and other surrounding communities, with a total of 17 sports (19 disciplines).

== Bidding process ==
Originally Newfoundland and Labrador was scheduled to host the 2021 Canada Summer Games (later postponed to 2022), but in October 2015 switched with Ontario. In February 2020, the bid process was launched, with the province appointing St. John's as the preferred community to host. The bid process included two steps and would conclude with a decision of hosting a year later. In April 2021, it was announced the city of St. John's was successful in its bid to host the Games.

== Venues ==
A total of 22 sport venues were used for the Games.

The Fortis Canada Games Complex was a newly built venue for the Games. The $34 million project featured a Class II IAAF Certified Track & Field including a 400m 8-lane track, a FIFA Quality Pro certified artificial soccer turf, and an indoor training facility for the development of amateur level sport in Newfoundland & Labrador. This included an indoor warm up track, a timing building located on the finish line, and an accessible walking path around the entire track.

Due to wildfires in the area, some events had to change venues. Beach volleyball events were postponed due to the partial evacuation of Paradise, as well as the sailing events scheduled for Conception Bay South. Lacrosse matches were moved to the DF Barnes Arena in St. John's, and soccer games to the Fortis Canada Games Complex and King George V Park, also in St. John's.

=== St. John's ===
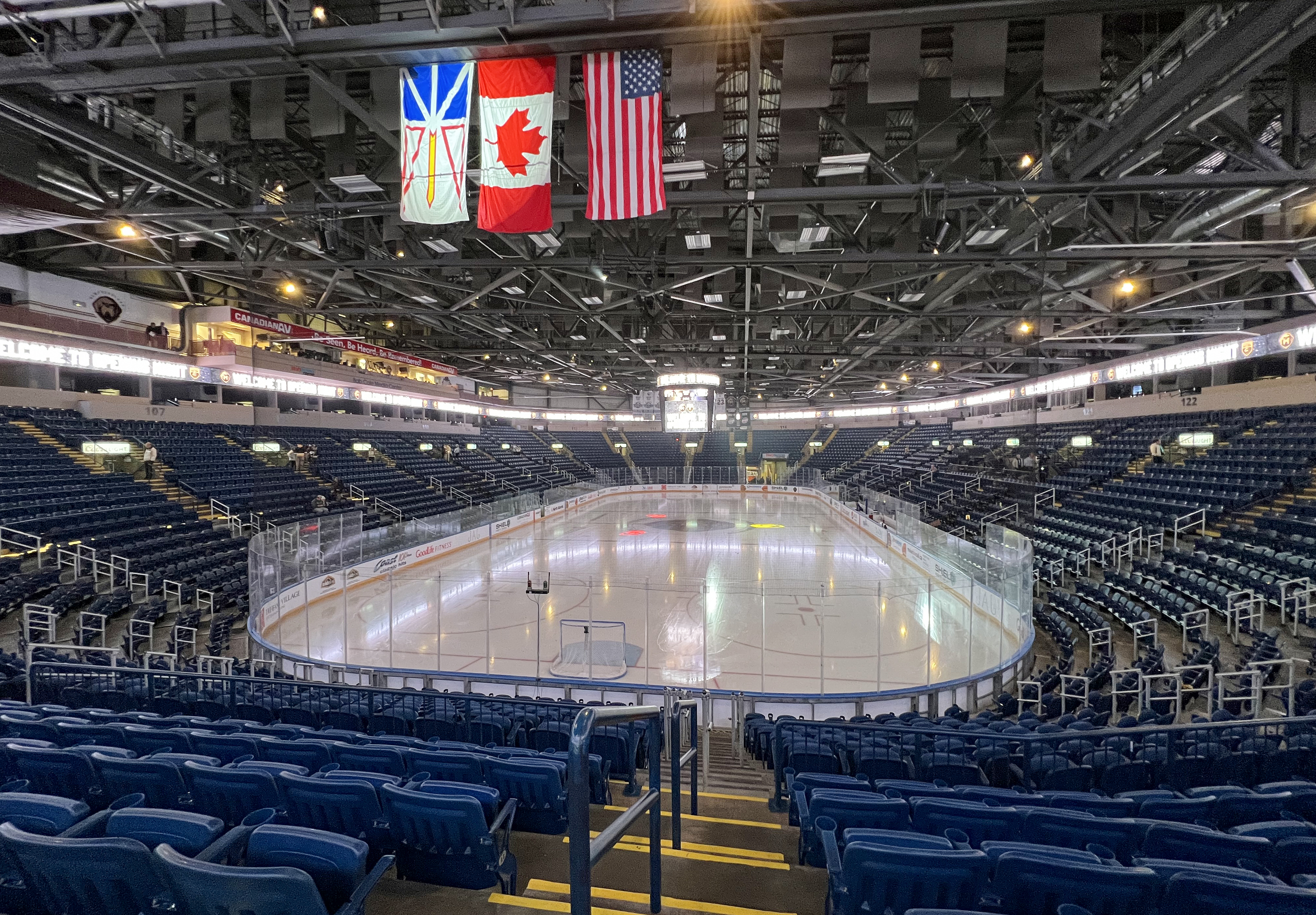
Mary Brown's Centre was a non-sport venue, hosting both the opening and closing ceremonies

Venue	Sport(s)
Mary Brown's Centre	Opening ceremony Closing ceremony
Bally Haly Country Club	Golf
Caribou Memorial Softball Complex	Softball
Downtown St. John's	Cycling (Road)
Fortis Canada Games Complex	Athletics; Soccer
Green Belt Tennis Club	Tennis
King George V Soccer Stadium	Soccer
Memorial University of Newfoundland Field House	Basketball; Volleyball
Newfoundland and Labrador Sport Centre	Basketball; Volleyball
Pippy Park	Cycling (mountain biking)
Quidi Vidi Lake	Canoeing
St. Patrick's Park	Baseball
Team Gushue Highway	Cycling (road)
Aquarena	Artistic swimming Diving; Swimming
Swilers Rugby Club	Rugby sevens

=== Outlying venues ===
Venue	Location	Sport(s)
CBS Soccer Field	Conception Bay South	Soccer
Royal Newfoundland Yacht Club	Conception Bay South	Sailing
Glacier Arena	Mount Pearl	Wrestling
Team Gushue Sports Complex – Smallwood Field	Mount Pearl	Baseball
Marine Drive	Logy Bay-Middle Cove-Outer Cove	Cycling (road)
Paradise Double Ice Complex	Paradise	Box lacrosse
Paradise Park	Paradise	Beach Volleyball
Rotary Sunshine Park	Portugal Cove–St. Philip's	Swimming (open water)

== Sports ==
A total of 240 events over 17 sports and 19 disciplines were held. The majority of sports were confirmed in April 2019, when 14 sports and 16 disciplines were announced. Rugby sevens (both genders) was the host choice sport, and women's baseball and golf were added in October 2022 as the final events to round out the program. Events in athletics, road cycling, and swimming have para-sports events contested, with athletics and swimming having Special Olympics competitions also. Artistic swimming made its Canada Summers Games program debut, after only being featured at Winter editions in the past. Women's baseball also made its Canada Games debut. Rowing and triathlon were dropped from the sport program compared to the previous edition of the Games.

- Artistic swimming (3)
- Athletics (58)
- Baseball (2)
- Basketball
- Box lacrosse (2)
- Canoe-Kayak (38)
- Cycling
  - Mountain biking (10)
  - Road cycling (6)
- Diving (9)
- Golf (3)
- Rugby sevens (2)
- Sailing (4)
- Soccer (2)
- Softball (2)
- Swimming (68)
- Tennis (1)
- Volleyball
  - Beach volleyball (2)
  - Volleyball (2)
- Wrestling (24)

== Calendar ==
OC	Opening ceremony	●	Event competitions	1	Event finals	CC	Closing ceremony

August	9th Sat	10th Sun	11th Mon	12th Tues	13th Wed	14th Thur	15th Fri	16th Sat	17th Sun	18th Mon	19th Tues	20th Wed	21st Thur	22nd Fri	23rd Sat	24th Sun	Total
Ceremonies	OC															CC	
Artistic Swimming											●	●	●	1	1	1	3
Athletics											7	5		20	25	1	58
Baseball		●	●	●	●		●	1		●	●	●	●	●	●	1	2
Basketball		●	●	●	●	●	●	2									2
Box lacrosse		●	●	●	●	●	1				●	●	●	●	●	1	2
Canoe/Kayak			8	8	12	10											38
Cycling			4		4			2				2		2		2	16
Diving											2	2	2	1	1	1	9
Golf											●	●	●	3			3
Rugby sevens			●	●	2												2
Sailing			●			●	●	4									4
Soccer		●	●	●		●	1				●	●	●		●	1	2
Softball		●	●	●	●	●	1				●	●	●	●	●	1	2
Swimming		6	15	16	14	15	2										68
Tennis		●	●	●	●	●	●	1									1
Volleyball		●	●	●	●	●	●	2			●	●	●	●	●	2	4
Wrestling													●	2	22		24
Total gold medals		6	27	24	32	25	5	12	0	0	9	9	2	29	49	11	240
August	9th Sat	10th Sun	11th Mon	12th Tues	13th Wed	14th Thur	15th Fri	16th Sat	17th Sun	18th Mon	19th Tues	20th Wed	21st Thur	22nd Fri	23rd Sat	24th Sun	Total

== Participating provinces and territories ==
All 13 of Canada's provinces and territories competed. The number of competitors each province or territory entered is in brackets.

- Alberta (385)
- British Columbia (390)
- Manitoba (376)
- New Brunswick (355)
- Newfoundland and Labrador (340)
- Northwest Territories (129)
- Nova Scotia (373)
- Nunavut (71)
- Ontario (400)
- Prince Edward Island (301)
- Quebec (399)
- Saskatchewan (377)
- Yukon (191)

== Medal table ==
* Host nation (Newfoundland and Labrador)

Rank	Team	Gold	Silver	Bronze	Total
1	Quebec	63	58	52	173
2	Ontario	63	57	55	175
3	British Columbia	43	32	41	116
4	Alberta	22	30	29	81
5	Nova Scotia	21	22	18	61
6	Saskatchewan	13	14	21	48
7	Manitoba	12	10	12	34
8	New Brunswick	5	7	5	17
9	Newfoundland and Labrador*	1	4	1	6
10	Prince Edward Island	0	1	3	4
11	Northwest Territories	0	0	0	0
11	Nunavut	0	0	0	0
11	Yukon	0	0	0	0
Totals (13 entries)		243	235	237	715
