= Canada Games =

Biennial Canadian sporting event, alternating between winter and summer sports

Canada Games Jeux du Canada

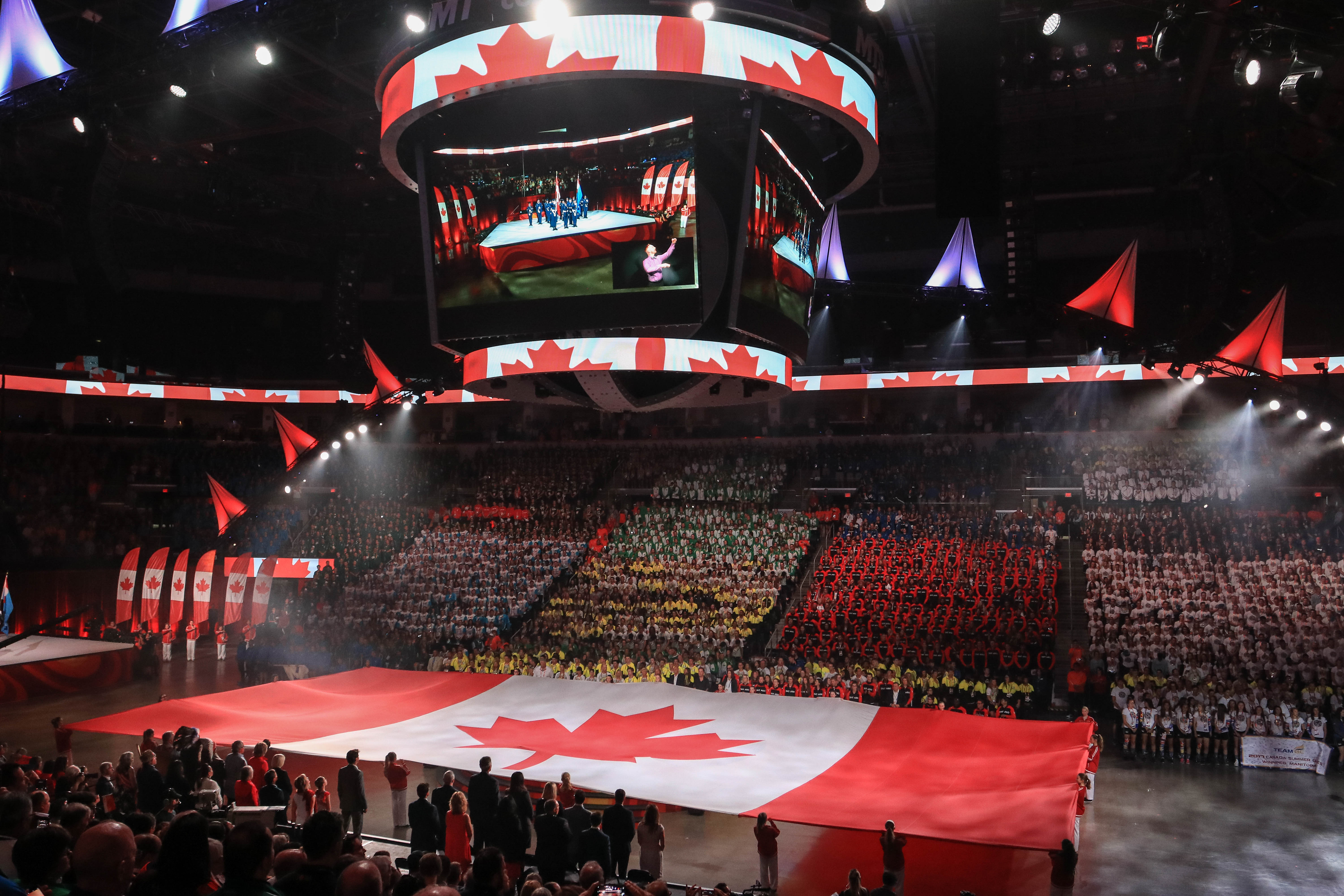
- Opening ceremonies 2017 Canada Summer Games
- Status: Active
- Genre: Multi-sport event
- Frequency: Biannual
- Location: Various
- Country: Canada
- Inaugurated: Winter Games; 1967; 59 years ago Summer Games; 1969; 57 years ago
- Organiser: Canada Games Council
- Website: canadagames.ca

The Canada Games (French: Jeux du Canada) is a multi-sport event held every two years, alternating between the winter and summer games. They represent the highest level of national competition for Canadian athletes, with athlete age eligibility rules varying by sport. Two separate programs are organized in order to cover the seasons: the Canada Summer Games (CSG) and the Canada Winter Games (CWG).

The first Canada Winter Games were the 1967 Canada Winter Games, and the most recent were the 2023 Canada Winter Games which took place from February 18 to March 5 in the province of Prince Edward Island. The next winter event, the 2027 Canada Winter Games, will be hosted in Quebec City, Quebec from February 27 to March 14.

The first Canada Summer Games were the 1969 Canada Summer Games, and the most recent were the 2025 Canada Summer Games which took place August 9–24 in St. John's, Newfoundland and Labrador. The next summer event, the 2029 Canada Summer Games, will be hosted in Moncton and Saint John, New Brunswick.

== History ==
The Games were first held in 1967 in Quebec City as part of Canada's Centennial celebrations. For the first time in Canada's history, 1,800 athletes from 10 provinces and two territories gathered to compete in 15 sports. Since 1967, over 75,000 athletes have participated in the Games. The Games have been hosted in every province at least once since their inception in Quebec City during Canada’s Centennial in 1967. Journalist Eddie MacCabe wrote a history book for the 25th anniversary of the Canada Games in 1992.

=== Facility development ===
Facilities built for the Canada Games
Facility	Games	City and Province
Canada Games Pool	1973	New Westminster, British Columbia
Aquarena	1977	St. John's, Newfoundland
Canada Games Aquatic Centre	1985	Saint John, New Brunswick
Hillside Stadium and Aquatic Centre	1993	Kamloops, British Columbia
Corner Brook Canada Games Centre and Annex	1999	Corner Brook, Newfoundland
TD Waterhouse Stadium	2001	London, Ontario
Yukon University athlete's village (student residences)	2007	Whitehorse, Yukon
Canada Games Centre	2011	Clayton Park, Halifax, Nova Scotia
Canada Games Sport For Life Centre	2017	Winnipeg, Manitoba
Canada Games Park	2022	Thorold, Ontario
Fortis Canada Games Complex	2025	St John's, Newfoundland and Labrador

== Sports ==
Over the history of the Canada Games, more than 30 sports have been featured, a variety of sports have been added and dropped at various points within the Summer Games and Winter Games programs. The winter games include some sports not associated with winter.

The 2025 Canada Summer Games featured artistic swimming, athletics, baseball, basketball, box lacrosse, canoe-kayak, cycling, mountain biking, road cycling, diving, golf, rugby sevens, sailing, soccer, softball, swimming, tennis, volleyball, beach volleyball, volleyball, and wrestling.

The 2023 Canada Winter Games featured alpine skiing, archery, badminton, biathlon, boxing, cross-country skiing, curling, fencing, figure skating, freestyle skiing, gymnastics, hockey, judo, karate, ringette, short track speed skating, snowboarding, speed skating, squash, table tennis, and wheelchair basketball.

== Organization ==
The games are governed by the Canada Games Council, a private, non-profit organization. As the Games move from one host community to the next, the Council provides the continuity, leadership and support to Host Societies in key areas such as sport technical, organizational planning, ceremonies and protocol, marketing and sponsorship. In addition, the Canada Games Council ensures effective long-term partnerships with national sport organizations, governments and the corporate sector. The Canada Games Council is a well-established, national organization that fosters on-going partnerships with organizations at the municipal, provincial and national levels.

=== Host Society ===
The individual games are run by the local Host Society, a non-profit private organization that is established 2–4 years prior to the event. The Host Society functions in accordance with an agreement between the Canada Games Council, the government of Canada, the government of the province or territory and the government of the municipality. The Canada Games Council maintains and secures long-term partnership agreements with governments, corporations and national sport organizations.

=== Funding ===
Funding for the games comes from the several levels of government together with donations and corporate sponsorships. A considerable portion of the work during the games is performed by local volunteers.

== Hosts ==
The host cities have not been chosen for the games after 2029, but the provinces through 2037 have.

=== Summer ===
Edition	Year	Host city	Host Province/Territory	Start Date	End Date	Competitors	Sports	Canada Games flag
1	1969	Halifax	Nova Scotia	August 16	August 24	715	15	Ontario
2	1973	New Westminster – Burnaby	British Columbia	August 3	August 12	1,676	16	British Columbia
3	1977	St. John's	Newfoundland and Labrador	August 7	August 19	1,709	18	Ontario
4	1981	Thunder Bay	Ontario	August 9	August 22	1,813	18	Ontario
5	1985	Saint John	New Brunswick	August 11	August 24	2,465	18	Ontario
6	1989	Saskatoon	Saskatchewan	August 8	August 21	2,465	18	Ontario
7	1993	Kamloops	British Columbia	August 6	August 22	3,253	17	Ontario
8	1997	Brandon	Manitoba	August 9	August 23	3,364	19	Ontario
9	2001	London	Ontario	August 10	August 25	3,487	18	Ontario
10	2005	Regina	Saskatchewan	August 6	August 20	3,511	16	Ontario
11	2009	Charlottetown-Summerside	Prince Edward Island	August 15	August 29	3,432	18	Ontario
12	2013	Sherbrooke	Quebec	August 2	August 17	3,361	19	Ontario
13	2017	Winnipeg	Manitoba	July 28	August 13	3,382	18	Ontario
14	2022*	Niagara Region	Ontario	August 6	August 21	5,000+	18	Ontario
15	2025	St. John's	Newfoundland and Labrador	August 8	August 24	4,000+	19	Ontario
16	2029	Moncton-Saint John	New Brunswick	TBD	TBD			
17	2033	TBD	Saskatchewan	TBD	TBD			
18	2037	TBD	Nova Scotia	TBD	TBD			

- The 2022 Canada Games were scheduled to be held in 2021, but were rescheduled to 2022 due to the COVID-19 pandemic.

=== Winter ===
Edition	Year	Host city	Host Province/Territory	Start Date	End Date	Competitors	Sports	Canada Games flag
1	1967	Quebec City	Quebec	February 11	February 19	557	15	Ontario
2	1971	Saskatoon	Saskatchewan	February 11	February 22	687	17	Ontario
3	1975	Lethbridge	Alberta	February 11	February 23	664	17	Quebec
4	1979	Brandon	Manitoba	February 12	February 24	1,962	17	Quebec
5	1983	Saguenay–Lac-Saint-Jean	Quebec	February 17	March 2	1,900	19	Ontario
6	1987	Cape Breton	Nova Scotia	February 14	February 28	1,995	17	Ontario
7	1991	Charlottetown	Prince Edward Island	February 17	March 2	2,304	19	Ontario
8	1995	Grande Prairie	Alberta	February 19	March 4	2,284	21	Ontario
9	1999	Corner Brook	Newfoundland and Labrador	February 20	March 6	2,808	21	Ontario
10	2003	Bathurst-Campbellton	New Brunswick	February 22	March 8	2,606	21	Quebec
11	2007	Whitehorse	Yukon	February 23	March 10	2,678	22	Ontario
12	2011	Halifax	Nova Scotia	February 11	February 27	2,238	20	Ontario
13	2015	Prince George	British Columbia	February 13	March 1	2,345	20	Ontario
14	2019	Red Deer	Alberta	February 17	March 3	2,377	20	Quebec
15	2023	Prince Edward Island	Prince Edward Island	February 18	March 5	3,600	21	Quebec
16	2027	Quebec City	Quebec	February 27	March 14	TBD	TBD	
17	2031	TBD	Quebec	TBD	TBD	TBD	TBD	

=== Host provinces/territories ===
List of regions ranked by times hosting Canada Games
Rank	Province/Territory	Summer	Winter	Total
1	Quebec	1 (2013)	3 (1967, 1983, 2027, 2031)	5
2	Nova Scotia	2 (1969, 2037)	2 (1987, 2011)	4
2	Saskatchewan	3 (1989, 2005, 2033)	1 (1971)	4
4	Alberta	0	3 (1975, 1995, 2019)	3
4	British Columbia	2 (1973, 1993)	1 (2015)	3
4	Manitoba	2 (1997, 2017)	1 (1979)	3
4	New Brunswick	2 (1985, 2029)	1 (2003)	3
4	Newfoundland and Labrador	2 (1977, 2025)	1 (1999)	3
4	Prince Edward Island	1 (2009)	2 (1991, 2023)	3
4	Ontario	3 (1981, 2001, 2022)	0	3
11	Yukon	0	1 (2007)	1
12	Northwest Territories	0	0	0
12	Nunavut	0	0	0

=== Map of host cities ===
Host cities of Canada Games

== All-time medal tables ==
For Games medal standings see List of Canada Games.

As of the 2025 Canada Games
Rank	Province/Territory	Gold	Silver	Bronze	Total
1	Ontario	1392	1193	1100	3685
2	Quebec	1237	1076	1035	3348
3	British Columbia	819	867	845	2531
4	Alberta	547	635	733	1815
5	Saskatchewan	212	290	379	881
6	Manitoba	190	240	327	757
7	Nova Scotia	237	240	300	737
8	New Brunswick	79	103	180	362
9	Newfoundland and Labrador	23	52	74	149
10	Prince Edward Island	12	23	31	65
11	Yukon	16	23	21	60
12	Northwest Territories	7	6	9	22
13	Nunavut	1	0	1	2

Summer Games
Rank	Province/territory	Gold	Silver	Bronze	Total
1	Ontario	826	633	602	2061
2	Quebec	499	541	520	1560
3	British Columbia	517	497	435	1449
4	Alberta	254	304	339	897
5	Nova Scotia	174	167	153	494
6	Saskatchewan	113	161	202	476
7	Manitoba	72	113	151	336
8	New Brunswick	38	52	64	154
9	Newfoundland and Labrador	5	23	27	55
10	Prince Edward Island	5	6	5	16
11	Yukon	2	1	3	6
12	Northwest Territories	0	0	0	0
13	Nunavut	1	0	0	1

Winter Games
Rank	Province/territory	Gold	Silver	Bronze	Total
1	Quebec	691	499	482	1672
2	Ontario	496	501	457	1454
3	British Columbia	284	326	370	990
4	Alberta	258	301	359	918
5	Manitoba	109	118	162	389
6	Saskatchewan	98	115	164	377
7	Nova Scotia	41	61	91	193
8	New Brunswick	38	46	108	192
9	Newfoundland and Labrador	17	23	47	87
10	Yukon	14	20	18	52
11	Prince Edward Island	6	17	25	48
12	Northwest Territories	7	6	9	22
13	Nunavut	0	0	1	1

=== Medal leaders by year ===
Canada Summer Games medal table leaders by year:

- 1969: Ontario
- 1973: British Columbia
- 1977: Ontario
- 1981: Ontario
- 1985: Ontario
- 1989: Ontario
- 1993: Ontario
- 1997: Ontario
- 2001: Ontario
- 2005: Ontario
- 2009: Ontario
- 2013: Ontario
- 2017: Ontario
- 2022: Ontario
- 2025: Ontario

Canada Winter Games medal table leaders by year:

- 1967: Ontario
- 1971: Ontario
- 1975: Quebec
- 1979: Quebec
- 1983: Ontario
- 1987: Quebec
- 1991: Quebec
- 1995: Quebec
- 1999: Quebec
- 2003: Quebec
- 2007: Quebec
- 2011: Quebec
- 2015: Quebec
- 2019: Quebec
- 2023: Quebec

Number of occurrences:

- Ontario – 17 times (14 Summer; 3 Winter)
- Quebec – 12 times (12 Winter)
- British Columbia – 1 time (1 Summer)

== See also ==
- BC Games
  - BC Summer Games
  - BC Winter Games
- Western Canada Summer Games
- Alberta Winter Games
- Saskatchewan Games
  - Saskatchewan Summer Games
  - Saskatchewan Winter Games
- Manitoba Games
- Ontario Games
- Quebec Games
