= 1975 Canada Winter Games =

- The logo of the Games
- Host city: Lethbridge, Alberta
- Country: Canada
- Opening: February 11, 1975
- Closing: February 23, 1975

Winter

Summer

The 1975 Canada Winter Games were hosted in Lethbridge, Alberta from 11–23 February 1975. Despite being hosted by Lethbridge, the games were held in 12 communities in southern Alberta spread out over 34,000 km^{2} (13,127 sq mi). More than 4,000 local volunteers helped with the event.

The Canada Games caused improvements to sporting events throughout the region, including the construction of the $4 million Canada Games Sportplex.

== Medals ==
* Host nation ( Alberta)

Rank	Team	Gold	Silver	Bronze	Total
1	Quebec	30	18	24	72
2	Ontario	21	28	19	68
3	British Columbia	15	21	13	49
4	Alberta*	14	6	12	32
5	Manitoba	6	14	4	24
6	New Brunswick	3	0	5	8
7	Saskatchewan	2	5	16	23
8	Nova Scotia	2	4	5	11
9	Northwest Territories	2	0	2	4
10	Newfoundland	1	1	5	7
11	Prince Edward Island	0	1	1	2
12	Yukon	0	1	0	1
Totals (12 entries)		96	99	106	301

Source: "Medal standings". 1975 Lethbridge Canada Winter Games. Canada Games Council. Archived from the original on 2007-09-28.

== See also ==
- Canada Games
- Canada Winter Games
- List of Canada Games

Preceded by 1973 Canada Games	Canada Games; 1975	Succeeded by 1977 Canada Games
Preceded by 1971 Canada Winter Games	Canada Winter Games; 1975	Succeeded by 1979 Canada Winter Games
