= Pincher Creek =

Municipality in Alberta, Canada (est. 1898)

- Town
- Town of Pincher Creek
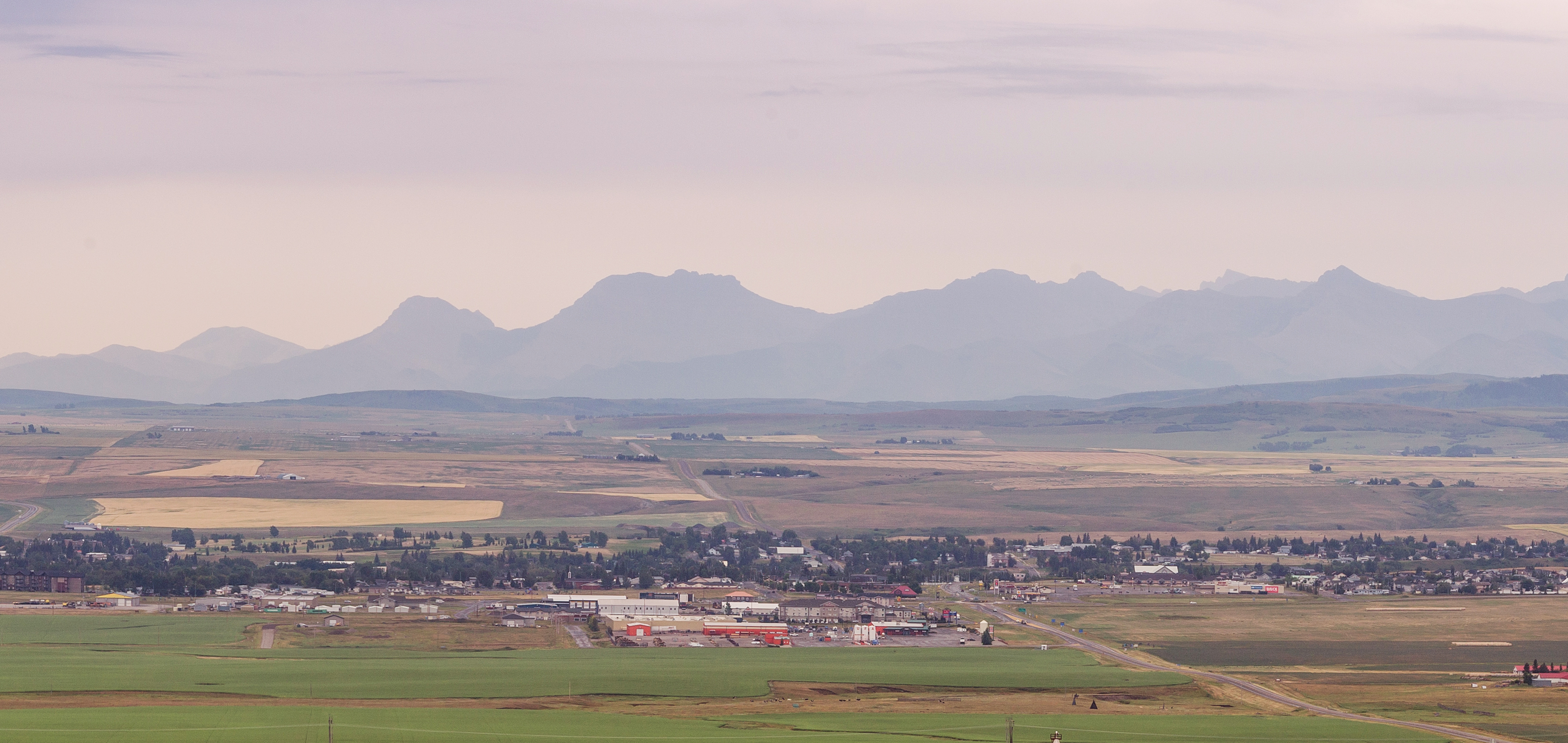
- Pincher Creek as seen from the North, with the Canadian Rockies in the background

- Location of Pincher Creek in Alberta
- Coordinates: 49°29′10″N 113°57′00″W
- Country: Canada
- Province: Alberta
- Region: Southern Alberta
- Census division: 3
- Municipal district: Municipal District of Pincher Creek No. 9
- Incorporated
  - Village: August 18, 1898
  - Town: May 12, 1906

Government
  - Mayor: Wayne Oliver
  - Governing body: Pincher Creek Town Council

Area (2021)
  - Land: 9.87 km^{2} (3.81 sq mi)
- Elevation: 1,130 m (3,710 ft)

Population (2021)
  - Total: 3,622
  - Density: 367.1/km^{2} (951/sq mi)
- Time zone: UTC−06:00 (Alberta Time)
- Postal code: T0K 1W0
- Area code: 403 / 587
- Highways: Highway 3 (Crowsnest Highway); Highway 6 Highway 507
- Waterways: Oldman River Reservoir
- Website: www.pinchercreek.ca

Pincher Creek is a town in southern Alberta, Canada. It is located immediately east of the Canadian Rockies, 101 km (63 mi) west of Lethbridge and 210 km (130 mi) south of Calgary.

== History ==
For centuries before European settlers reached this area and inhabited it, Indigenous clans of the Blackfoot, Peigan and Kootenai passed through, lived in or frequented the region.

The town received its name in 1868 when a group of prospectors lost a pincer in the small creek at this location. These pincers would have been used as a device for trimming the feet of the horses and thus had some value to the group. In 1874, the North-West Mounted Police came to southern Alberta. One of them discovered the rusting tools in the creek, and they named the area Pincher Creek.

Pincher Creek was officially listed as a place name in the Geological Survey Report, 1880.

In 1876, the NWMP established a horse farm in the area. It closed in 1881, but many of the troops stayed to help the town. James Schofield opened Pincher Creek's first store in 1884. By 1885 Pincher Creek had a store known as Schofield & Hyde General Store. Harry Hyde succeeded Schofield as Pincher Creek's first postmaster.

In 1898, Pincher Creek was incorporated a village. In 1906, the community was officially incorporated as a town and named Pincher Creek. Many residents are descendants of the pioneer families who settled there over 100 years ago.

== Geography ==
=== Climate ===
Strong Chinook winds often blow off the mountains and Pincher Creek can be extremely windy. The Oldman River and Castle River valleys seem to act as a kind of funnel for air masses, arguably making the area around Pincher Creek the windiest in Alberta. Any typical day may see wind speeds of 50–90 km/h, the most violent recorded wind being 177 km/h. The strong winds have given rise to a significant amount of wind farm development in the area, with the towers and blades of wind turbines being a characteristic of the scenery. Another consequence of the breezy conditions is that the weather is mostly sunny and very dry as the wind tends to dissipate cloud cover.

The town was severely affected by a flood that hit the area in 1995 as the peak stream flow discharge of the creek that gave the town its name was 271 cubic meters per second.

On January 10, 1962, a dramatic weather change happened in the area. The temperature in the area rose by 41 °C (74 °F) from -19 °C to 22 °C (-2 °F to 72 °F) in only a few hours.

== Attractions ==
The Kootenai Brown Pioneer Village is a popular tourist stop open year-round. It was named after Kootenai Brown, who was responsible for the preservation of the land Waterton Park now inhabits. The six-acre site is home to over thirty one historical buildings, all on open exhibit. Each July, the Village has a large Canada Day celebration, as well as hosting other community based events through the year. Among over 18,000 artifacts, historical archives are also located on site and accessible to the public.

Pincher Creek is located 57 km (35 mi) north of Waterton Lakes National Park, while Beauvais Lake Provincial Park is a 20 km (12 mi) drive to the southwest. Castle Mountain Ski Resort is located 49 km (30 mi) to the southwest. Head-Smashed-In Buffalo Jump World Heritage Site is 47 km (29 mi) to the northeast.

== Airport ==
The town is served by the Pincher Creek Airport which is a general aviation airfield that does not currently have any scheduled passenger airline flights.

== Media ==
Pincher Creek is served by two newspapers, the Sun Media owned Pincher Creek Echo, which publishes on Wednesdays and has been in operation since 1900 and the locally owned Shootin' the Breeze which has been serving the community since 2011. It is also served by an online news website, the Pincher Creek Voice, established in 2011.

Pincher Creek is served by Mountain Radio, a country music station based in nearby Blairmore. Mountain Radio's Pincher Creek transmitter can be heard on 92.7 FM.

== Demographics ==
Historical population
Year	Pop.	±%
1916 (est.)	1,050	—
1921 (est.)	1,200	+14.3%
1926 (est.)	1,100	−8.3%
1931 (est.)	1,000	−9.1%
1936	999	−0.1%
1941	985	−1.4%
1946	1,139	+15.6%
1951	1,456	+27.8%
1956	1,729	+18.8%
1961	2,830	+63.7%
1966	3,051	+7.8%
1971	3,337	+9.4%
1976	3,634	+8.9%
1981	3,825	+5.3%
1986	3,800	−0.7%
1991	3,660	−3.7%
1996	3,659	−0.0%
2001	3,666	+0.2%
2006	3,625	−1.1%
2011	3,685	+1.7%
2016	3,642	−1.2%

In the 2021 Census of Population conducted by Statistics Canada, the Town of Pincher Creek had a population of 3,622 living in 1,521 of its 1,661 total private dwellings, a change of −0.5% from its 2016 population of 3,642. With a land area of 9.87 km^{2} (3.81 sq mi), it had a population density of 367.0/km^{2} (950.4/sq mi) in 2021.

In the 2016 Census of Population conducted by Statistics Canada, the Town of Pincher Creek recorded a population of 3,642 living in 1,490 of its 1,589 total private dwellings, a −1.2% change from its 2011 population of 3,685. With a land area of 10.09 km^{2} (3.90 sq mi), it had a population density of 361.0/km^{2} (934.9/sq mi) in 2016.

The population of the Town of Pincher Creek according to its 2013 municipal census is 3,619, a 2.5% decrease from its 2008 municipal census population of 3,712.

== Notable people ==
- White Bird, Nez Perce leader
- Dustin Flundra, rodeo cowboy
- Matthew Halton, World War II news correspondent
- Beverley McLachlin, Hong Kong Court of Appeal judge and former Chief Justice of Canada
- Andy Russell, author and conservationist
- Gordon Walter Semenoff, theoretical physicist
- Darcy Wakaluk, former professional hockey player
- Warren Winkler, former Chief Justice of the Ontario Court of Appeal
- Darren Varley, murder victim
- Charlie Russell, naturalist, artist
- Ernest Sands, American politician
- Ruth Collins-Nakai, educator, researcher, physician leader, healthcare advisor, and public health advocate
- Fred Stenson, writer
- Ray Cote, former professional hockey player

== See also ==
- List of communities in Alberta
- List of towns in Alberta

== Images ==
Giant panorama, looking south towards Pincher Creek and Pincher Station on a rainy morning.
Panorama of Pincher Creek, looking northeast on a rainy morning.
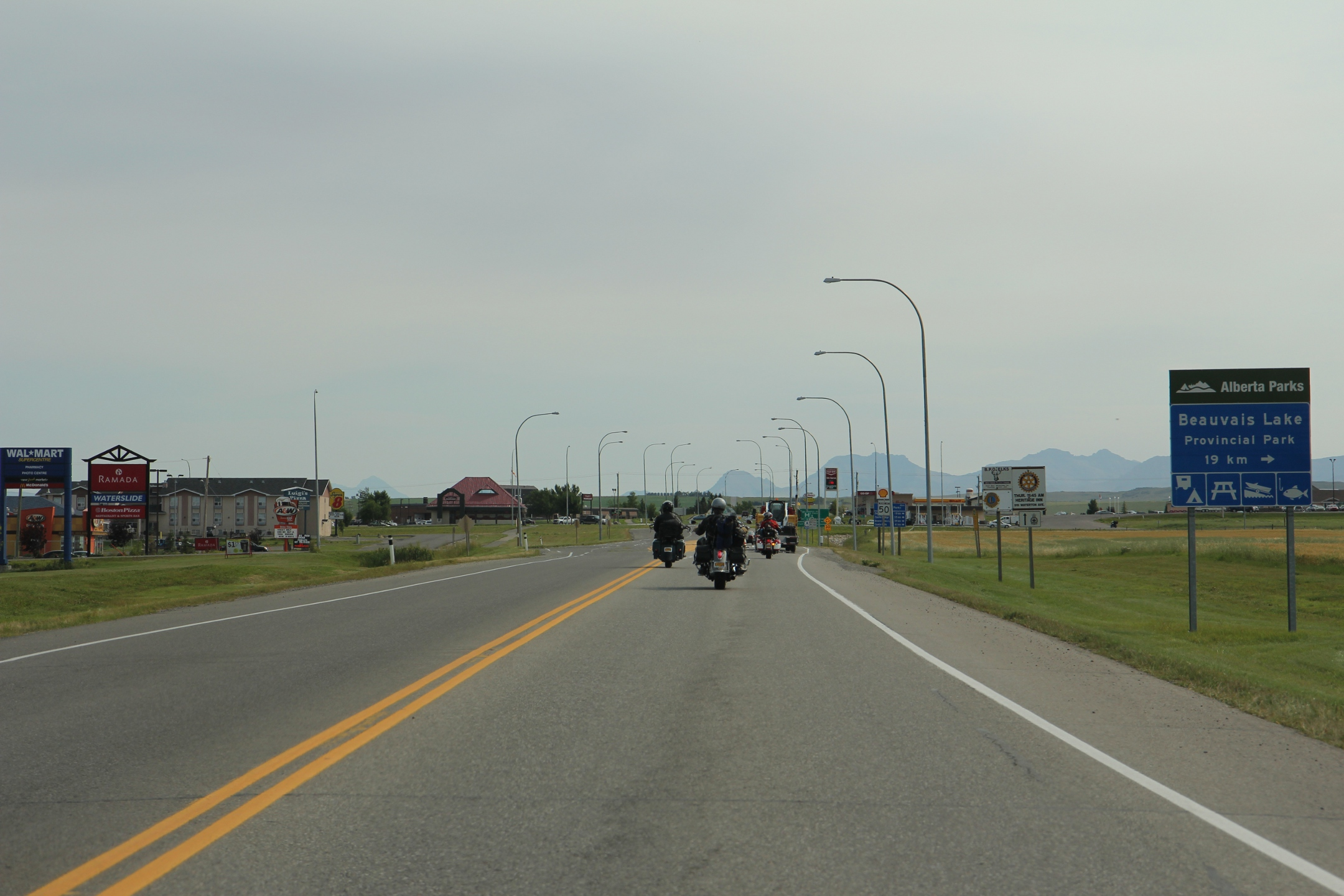
Looking south at Pincher Creek on Alberta Highway 6

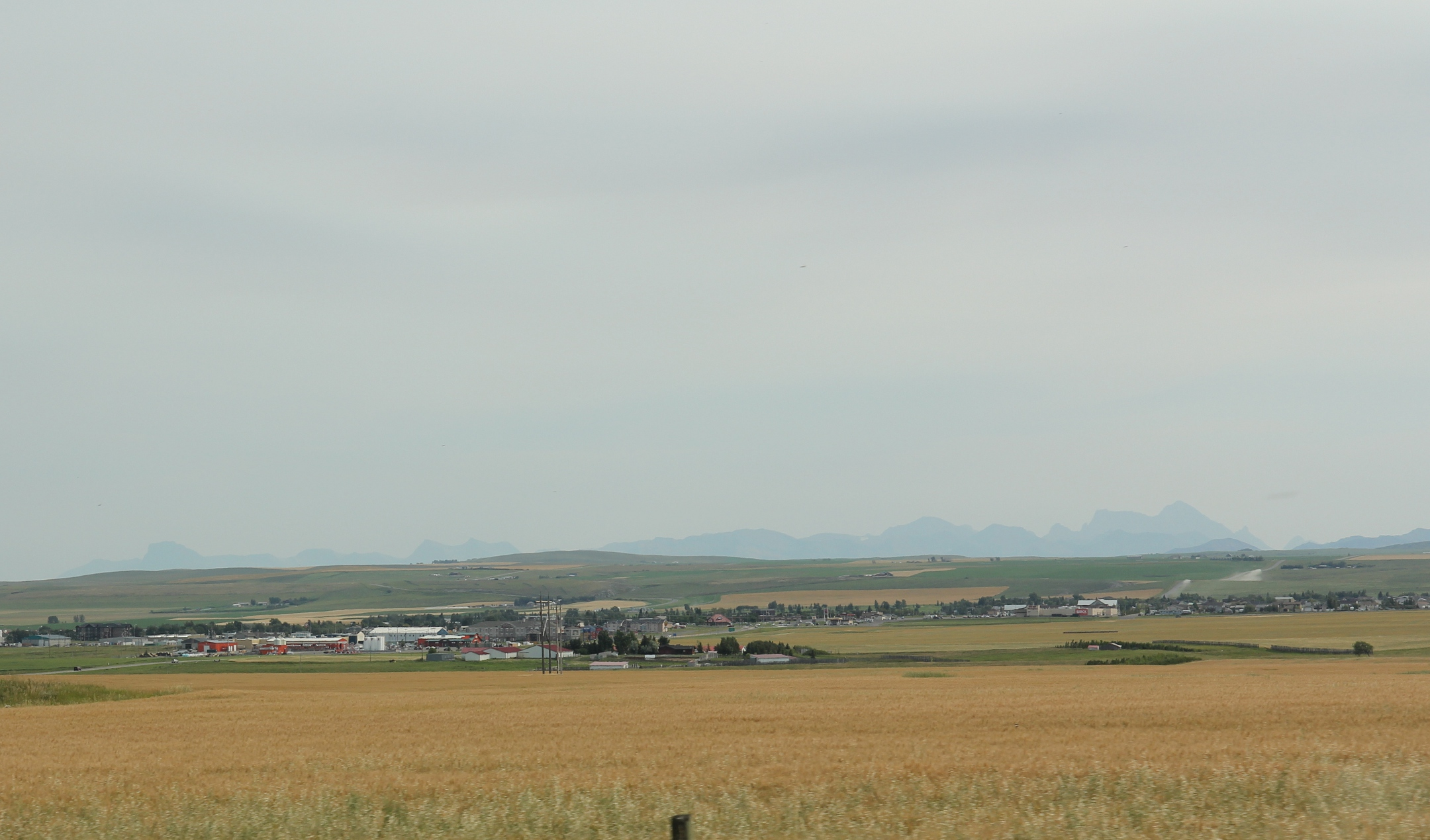
Panorama of Pincher Creek from Alberta Highway 3

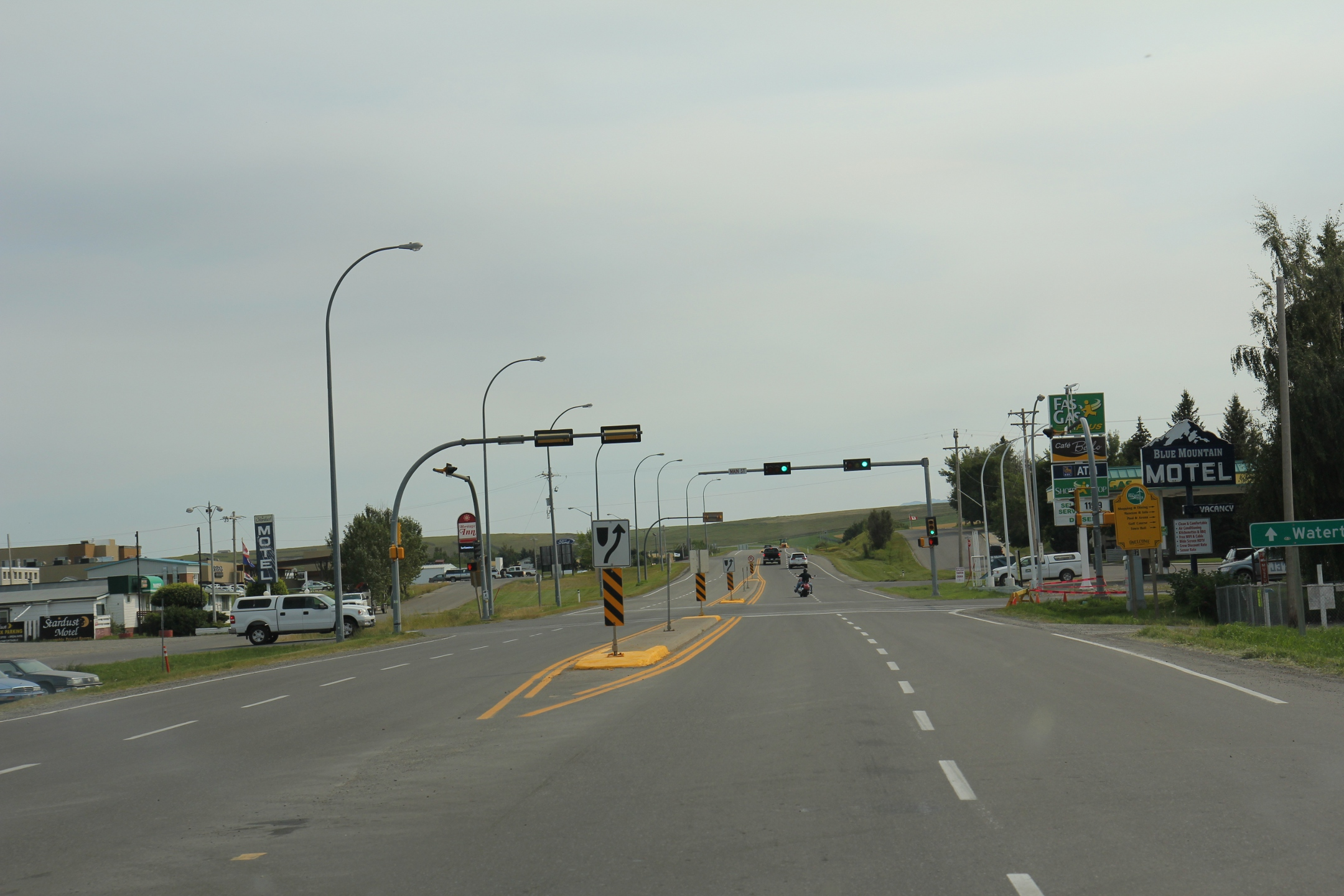
Looking south at the business district in Pincher Creek on Alberta Highway 6
