= 2029 Canada Summer Games =

- Host city: Moncton and Saint John, New Brunswick
- Opening: July 27
- Closing: August 12

Summer

Winter

The 2029 Canada Summer Games (French: 2029 Jeux du Canada) is a national multi-sport event celebrated in the tradition of the Canada Games, as governed by Canada Games Council (CGC). The Games are scheduled to be jointly held between the cities of Moncton and Saint John, New Brunswick, tentatively between July 27 and August 12, 2029. These games will be the 17th edition of the Summer Games, and 33rd overall. These will be the third Canada Games hosted by New Brunswick (1985 and 2003), and the second in the city of Saint John (1985).

== Bidding process ==
In March 2022, the Government of New Brunswick and the Canada Games Council announced that the province would be holding the 2029 Canada Summer Games. The bid process was launched on January 17, 2024. In May 2024, it was announced the cities of Moncton and Saint John would combined their bids together. and the cities were officially confirmed to be the hosts in April 2025.
