= Chief Mountain Border Station and Quarters =

- U.S. National Register of Historic Places
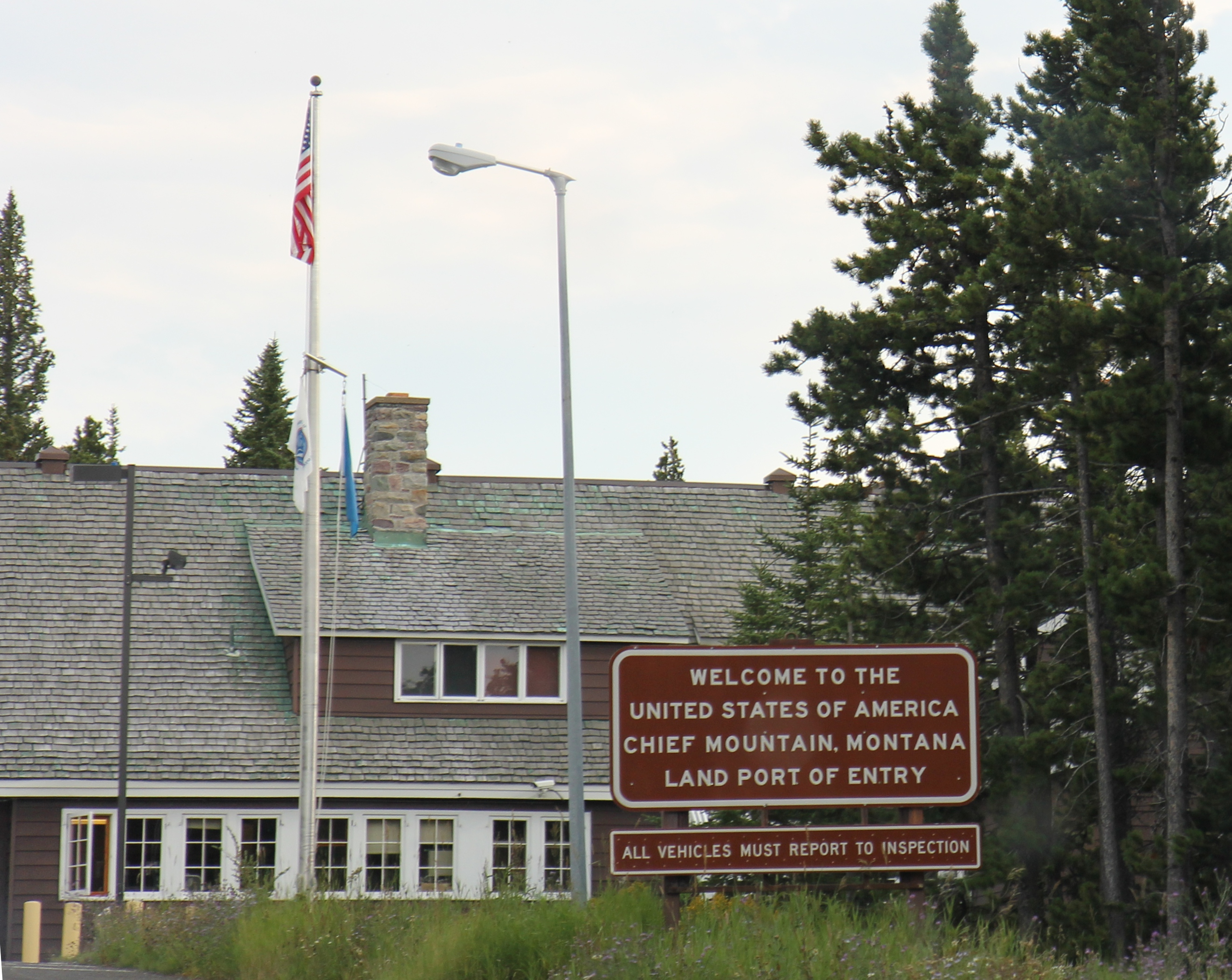
- North facade

- Location within Montana Location within the United States
- Nearest city: Babb, Montana
- Coordinates: 48°59′48″N 113°39′33″W
- Area: 1.4 acres (0.57 ha)
- Architect: Paul A. Brown (Customs station)
- Architectural style: National Park Service Rustic
- NRHP reference No.: 06000744
- Added to NRHP: May 20, 2008

The Chief Mountain Border Station and Quarters is a customs station on the Canada–United States border in Glacier County, Montana. Located on Montana Highway 17, the station is operated seasonally, primarily for tourist traffic between Glacier National Park in Montana and Waterton Lakes National Park in Alberta. The station is named after Chief Mountain, a prominent peak in the vicinity. The station is owned by the General Services Administration and operated by U.S. Customs and Border Protection, and is located within the boundaries of Glacier National Park. The station is a notable example of the National Park Service Rustic style and is listed on the National Register of Historic Places.

== Description ==
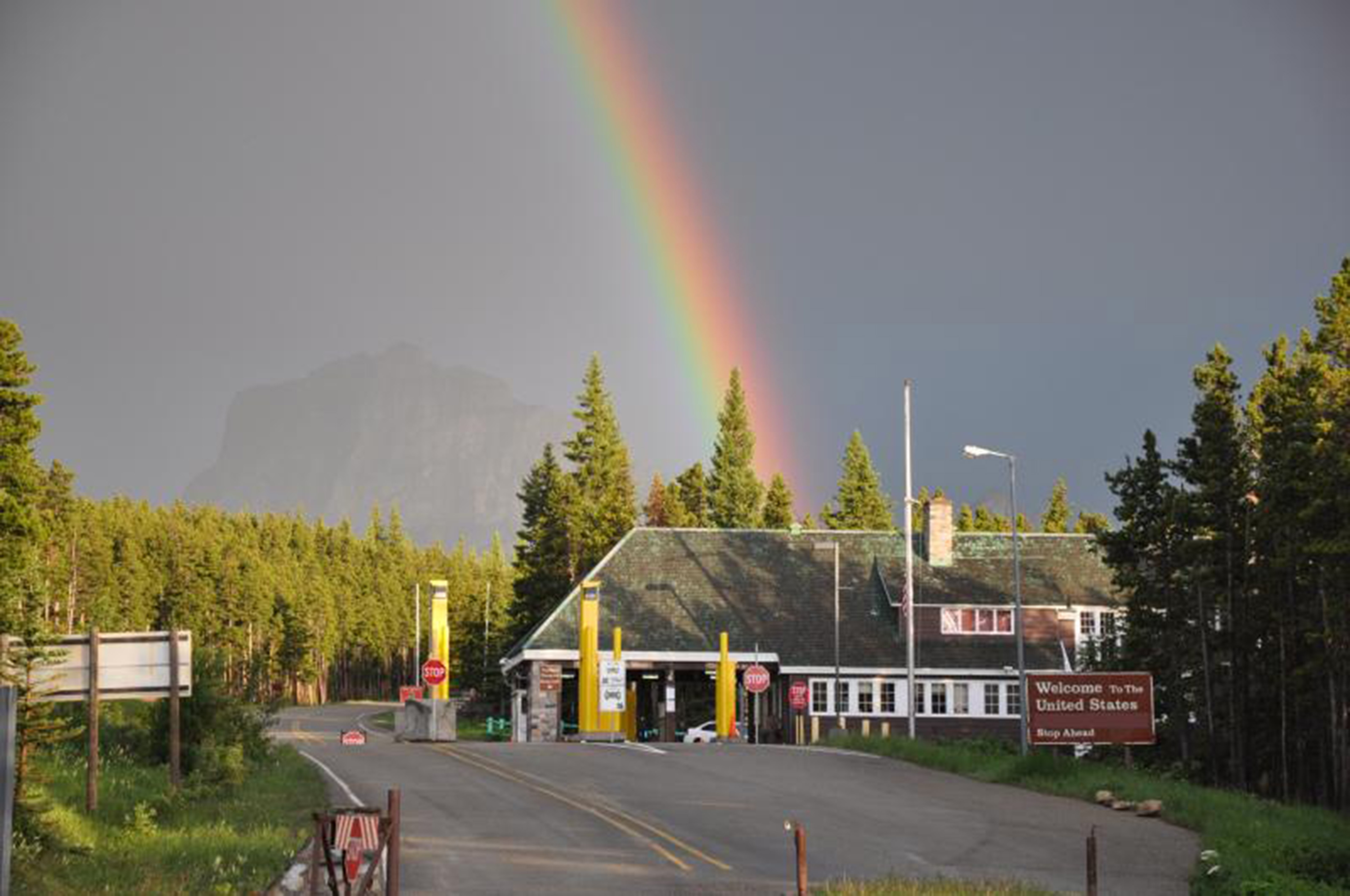
Chief Mountain Border Station

The Chief Mountain International Highway was completed in 1936. The customs station was built in 1939, designed by A. Paul Brown of the National Park Service. The 1 1/2-story structure is built of wood frame on a rubble stone foundation. The lower level is framed with posts and beams, while the upper portion is of light frame construction. The station is now sheathed in aluminum siding that mimics wood lap siding. The wood shingle roof was stained green, but has weathered to a natural gray. There are four stone chimneys. The interior retains much of its historic fabric, although almost all light fixtures have been replaced.

The main building is built into a hillside sloping away from the road. Built roughly in the form of a T, the building's roof extends over the road to form a large porte-cochère. The main level features a lobby with immigration and customs desks on the side facing the road, with two one-bedroom apartments on the rear extension. The second floor contains two studio apartments and a one-bedroom unit. The basement houses utility spaces and prisoner holding cells. A garage housing inspection bays with pits for the inspection of the undersides of vehicles is nearby.

== Historic designation ==
The Chief Mountain Customs Station was listed on the National Register of Historic Places on May 20, 2008.

== Status ==
The Chief Mountain crossing is typically open only from mid to late May to late September or October, during daylight and evening hours, based on weather conditions.
