= Alberta Highway 901 =

Highway in Alberta, Canada

Highway 901

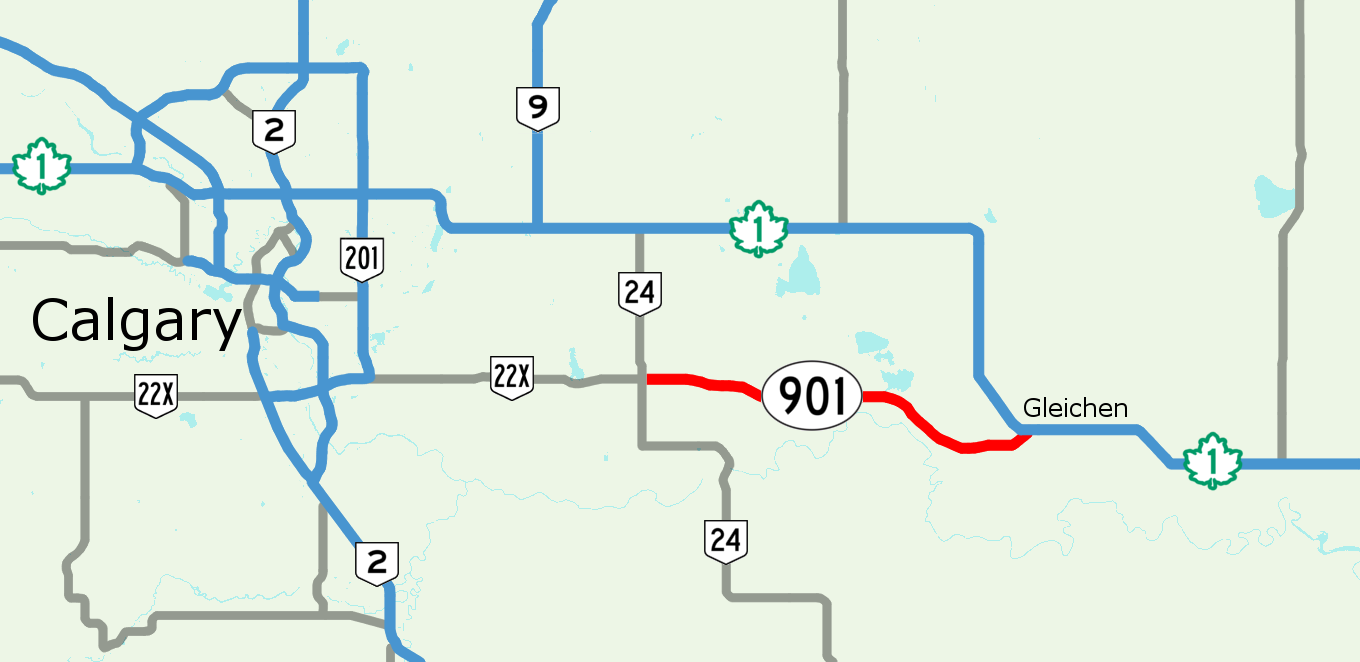
- Highway 901 highlighted in red

Route information
- Maintained by the Ministry of Transportation and Economic Corridors
- Length: 40.10 km (24.92 mi)

Major junctions
- West end: Highway 24 / Highway 22X near Carseland
- East end: Highway 1 (TCH) near Gleichen

Location
- Country: Canada
- Province: Alberta
- Specialized and rural municipalities: Wheatland County

Highway system
- Alberta Numbered Highway Network; List; Former
← Highway 899	→ Highway 921

Highway 901 is a 40-kilometre (25 mi) in southern Alberta, Canada that extends Highway 22X from Highway 24 to Highway 1 (Trans-Canada Highway) near Gleichen.

The highway has been receiving an increasing level of traffic, diverting vehicles from Highway 1 east of Gleichen. Since at least the late 1980s, the current alignment of Highway 901 has been earmarked as a possible new route for the Trans-Canada itself in order to bypass the bulk of Calgary.

== Route description ==
Preceded by Highway 22X in the west, Highway 901 begins at Highway 24, approximately 11 km (6.8 mi) northwest of the Hamlet of Carseland and 12 km (7.5 mi) south of the Hamlet of Cheadle. After intersecting Highway 817, the highway enters the Siksika I.R. No. 146, an Indian reserve of the Siksika Nation, intersecting Highway 547 south of the Hamlet of Gleichen. A short distance later, the highway leaves the Indian reserve and ends at the Trans-Canada Highway, 3 km (1.9 mi) east of Gleichen.

== Major intersections ==
The following is a list of major intersections along Highway 901 from west to east.

Rural/specialized municipality	Location	km	mi	Destinations	Notes
Wheatland County		0.0	0.0	Highway 22X west – Calgary Highway 24 – Cheadle, Vulcan, Lethbridge	Continues as Highway 22X
Wheatland County		9.8	6.1	Highway 817 – Strathmore, Carseland	
Siksika 146		36.0	22.4	Highway 547 – Gleichen, Arrowwood	
Wheatland County	Gleichen	40.0	24.9	Highway 1 (TCH) – Calgary, Medicine Hat	
1.000 mi = 1.609 km; 1.000 km = 0.621 mi
