= Farrow, Alberta =

Farrow
- Unincorporated community
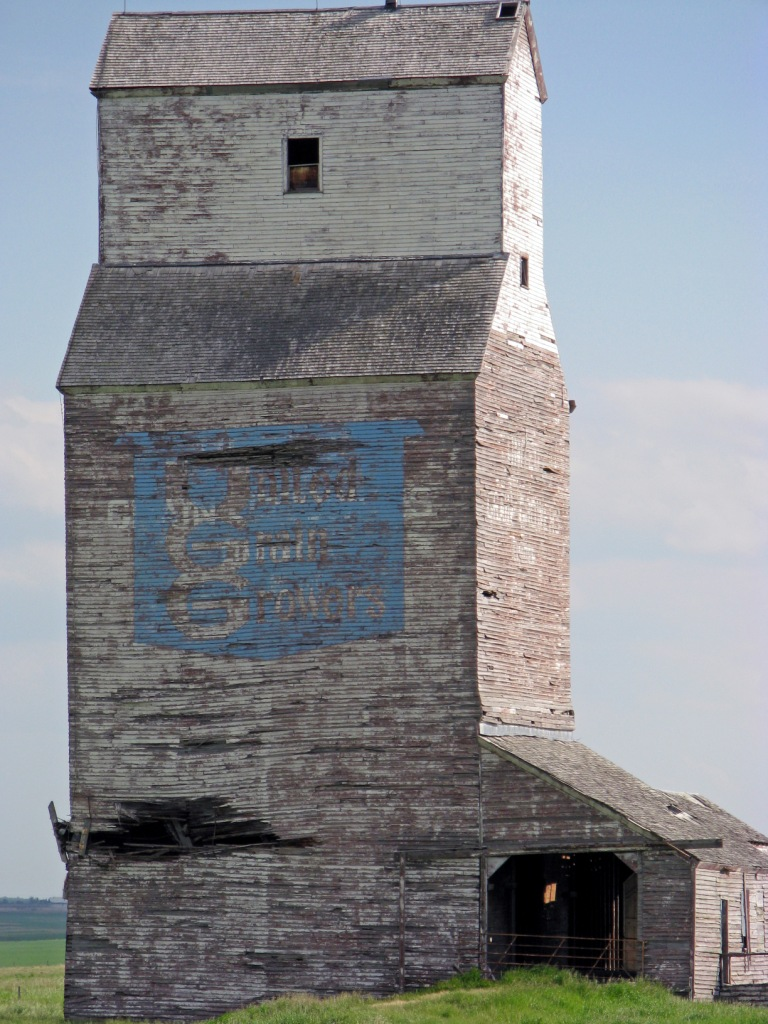
- The former United Grain Growers elevator along the CP rail line

- Location within Alberta
- Coordinates: 50°41′11″N 113°24′16″W
- Country: Canada
- Province: Alberta
- Region: Southern Alberta
- Census division: 5
- Municipal district: Vulcan County

Government
  - Governing body: Vulcan County Council
- Time zone: UTC−06:00 (Alberta Time)
- Postal code span: List of T Postal Codes of Canada
- Area code: +1-403
- Highways: Highway 24 (2km north)
- Railways: Canadian Pacific

Farrow is an unincorporated community in Vulcan County, Alberta, Canada. The community is located 5 km off of Highway 24 on Township road 202, about 25 km north of Vulcan and 82 km southeast of the City of Calgary. The community has been completely abandoned and is now owned by a local farmer (no trespassing). Most of the remaining buildings of the former community including a Church/school, a house, a fallen store, and out buildings have all been demolished completely. The remains can now be seen from aboard the Aspen crossing railway.

Farrow was originally known as Glenview or Randle for a short time. The name was changed to "Farrow" the maiden name of the wife of the Superintendent of the C.P.R. at that time.

== History ==
History taken from; Furrows of time: a history of Arrowwood, Shouldice, Mossleigh and Farrow, 1883-1982

In 1930 the Canadian Pacific Railway built a branch line to serve the areas south and east of the Bow River. The new branch was separated from the main line of the Aldersyde - Kipp - Lethbridge route at Eltham (Eltham Junction), which boasted a station and a station agent, at that time.

Before the coming of the Railway, Farrow was originally known as Glenview or Randle. The name was changed to "Farrow" the maiden name of the wife of A Halkett, the Superintendent of the C.P.R. at that time.

With the proposal of laying a gravel road through Farrow to link Highway 1 with Highway 23, businesses and people began to build. Farrow was expected to become a thriving commercial center. with many new businesses opening. Two grain elevators the Independent and United Grain Growers both built in 1930, About the same time Bill Thompson's General Store, Jone's Confectionery, were built. Followed by a blacksmith shop, lumber yard, Irvine Daub's service Station, Vanderberg's garage, and Hesketh's butcher shop. The Farrow United Church was built on the hill above town and there were a number of residences. These were the homes of Art Weber, Alex Adamson, Bill Schultz, who had bought the Bill Thompson's Store, and Mr. Vanderberg. Most of the building was done by Les Bowden and his son Arnold who were friends of Irvine Daub and came from Champion.

That all changed in 1932 when the gravel road now Highway 24 by-passed Farrow by two miles to the north to the Hamlet of Mossleigh. Unfortunately traffic followed the new road and Mossleigh became the business center of the district leaving Farrow to die off.

In a very short time the blacksmith shop ant the confectionery closed. Mr. Hesketh moved his butcher shop to Mossleigh; the lumber yard was sold to Harry Huntley and moved to his farm; Irvin Daub Bought Adamson's house and moved it and his service station to Mossleigh; the Vanderbergs moved north and their house burned down. Bill Schultz stayed until 1934 when he sold his store and house to Mrs. Armanda Despas, who, with her son operated a trucking business until 1950.

From 1930-1935 Mr. Thompson, Mrs. Weber and Mrs. Shultz were in charge of the post office. Mrs. Despas was postmistress from 1935 until she retired in 1958. On her retirement the Farrow Post Office was closed for good. Those who received mail there were transferred to Blackie R.R. No. 1.

The elevators remained in operation through the years, serving the farming community.

Alex Adamson Was the first buyer for the UGG in 1930. He was followed by V. Coglan in 1933 and S. Chilton in 1935. The U.G.G. elevator was closed in 1936-37 but reopened in 1938 with J.E. Stier as agent, followed by Nels Ekeland in 1943 and lastly Fritz Mason from 1944 to 1977.

The Independent Grain Company opened with Art Weber as agent followed by Tom Moore, Frank Thurber and Jack Hunter. In 1946 the United Grain Growers bought out the Independent and operated it as U.G.G. No. 2 Fitz Mason was agent for both until they were closed in 1977. The Independent elevator was demolished in the 1980s.

== See also ==
- List of communities in Alberta
- List of ghost towns in Alberta
