= Alberta Highway 24 =

Highway in Alberta, Canada

Highway 24

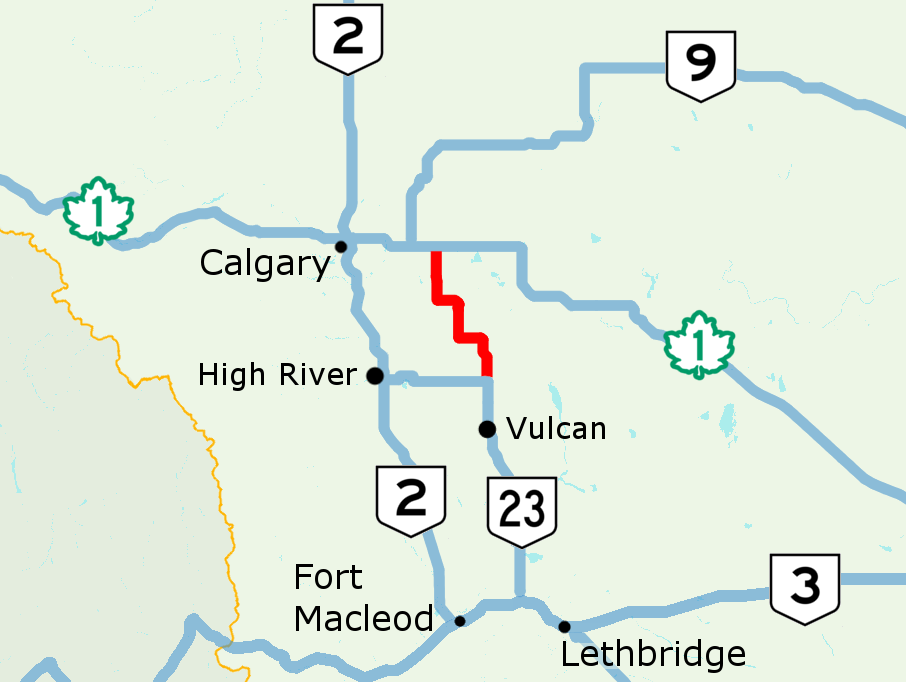
- Highway 24 highlighted in red

Route information
- Maintained by the Ministry of Transportation and Economic Corridors
- Length: 69 km (43 mi)

Major junctions
- South end: Highway 23 / Highway 542 near Vulcan
- Highway 22X near Dalemead
- North end: Highway 1 (TCH) near Cheadle

Location
- Country: Canada
- Province: Alberta
- Specialized and rural municipalities: Vulcan County, Wheatland County

Highway system
- Alberta Numbered Highway Network; List; Former
← Highway 23	→ Highway 25

Highway 24 is a highway in southern Alberta, Canada, east of Calgary.

== Route description ==
Highway 24 begins along the Trans-Canada Highway 10 km (6.2 mi) west of the Town of Strathmore and proceeds south past the Hamlet of Cheadle. At 6 km (3.7 mi) south of Highway 1, it crosses Glenmore Trail and intersects Highway 22X to the west and Highway 901 to the east at a four-way stop 9 km (6 mi) later.

Highway 24 continues south for another 6 km (3.7 mi) before it turns to the east. 5 km (3.1 mi) later, it passes Carseland, after which Highway 817 branches north toward Strathmore while Highway 24 crosses the Bow River on its way south. Wyndham-Carseland Provincial Park is on the east side of this stretch of road.

When Highway 24 meets Highway 547 westbound, it turns east and passes the Hamlet of Mossleigh. At Highway 547 eastbound it turns south for 20 km (12 mi) to its end at the junction of Highway 23 and Highway 542 north of Vulcan.

== Future ==
Plans are being made for a new diamond interchange at the North end of Highway 24 near Cheadle and Highway 1, as part of the Highway 1 Realignment Project. The purpose of this project is to upgrade the adjacent section of Trans-Canada Highway to freeway status (with 4 lanes in either direction) and bypass the town of Strathmore. As part of this project, there is also the possibility of changes to the Highway name designation for Northern 16 km stretch of Highway 24. As part of the project Highway 817 could be re-designated as new section of Highway 24, therefore leaving the old section of Highway 24 renamed to Cheadle Road or simply Range Road 262. An official decision on the naming designation has yet to be made.

== Major intersections ==
From south to north:

Rural/specialized municipality	Location	km	mi	Destinations	Notes
Vulcan County		0.0	0.0	Highway 23 – High River, Vulcan, Lethbridge; Highway 542 east – Milo	Highway 24 southern terminus; continues as Highway 23 south
Vulcan County		17.1	10.6	Highway 547 east – Arrowwood, Gliechen	South end of Highway 547 concurrency
Vulcan County	Mossleigh	19.8	12.3		
Vulcan County		25.8	16.0	Highway 547 west – Aldersyde	North end of Highway 547 concurrency
↑ / ↓		38.7	24.0	Crosses the Bow River	
Wheatland County		39.9	24.8	Highway 817 north – Strathmore	Proposed Highway 24 realignment
Wheatland County	Carseland	43.3	26.9		
Wheatland County		54.9	34.1	Highway 22X west – Calgary; Highway 901 east – Gliechen	
Wheatland County		63.0	39.1	Township Road 234 (Glenmore Trail) – Langdon, Calgary	
Wheatland County	Cheadle	66.9	41.6		
Wheatland County		69.4	43.1	Highway 1 (TCH) – Calgary, Strathmore, Medicine Hat	Highway 24 northern terminus
1.000 mi = 1.609 km; 1.000 km = 0.621 mi: Concurrency terminus
