= Alberta Highway 22X =

Highway in Alberta

Highway 22X
- Calgary area with Highway 22X highlighted in red

Route information
- Maintained by the Ministry of Transportation and Economic Corridors
- Length: 54 km (34 mi)

Major junctions
- East end: Highway 24 / Highway 901 near Carseland
- Highway 2A in Calgary; Highway 201 in Calgary; Highway 2 in Calgary
- West end: Highway 22 near Priddis

Location
- Country: Canada
- Province: Alberta
- Specialized and rural municipalities: Wheatland County, Rocky View County, Foothills No. 31 M.D.
- Major cities: Calgary

Highway system
- Alberta Numbered Highway Network; List; Former
← Highway 22	→ Highway 23

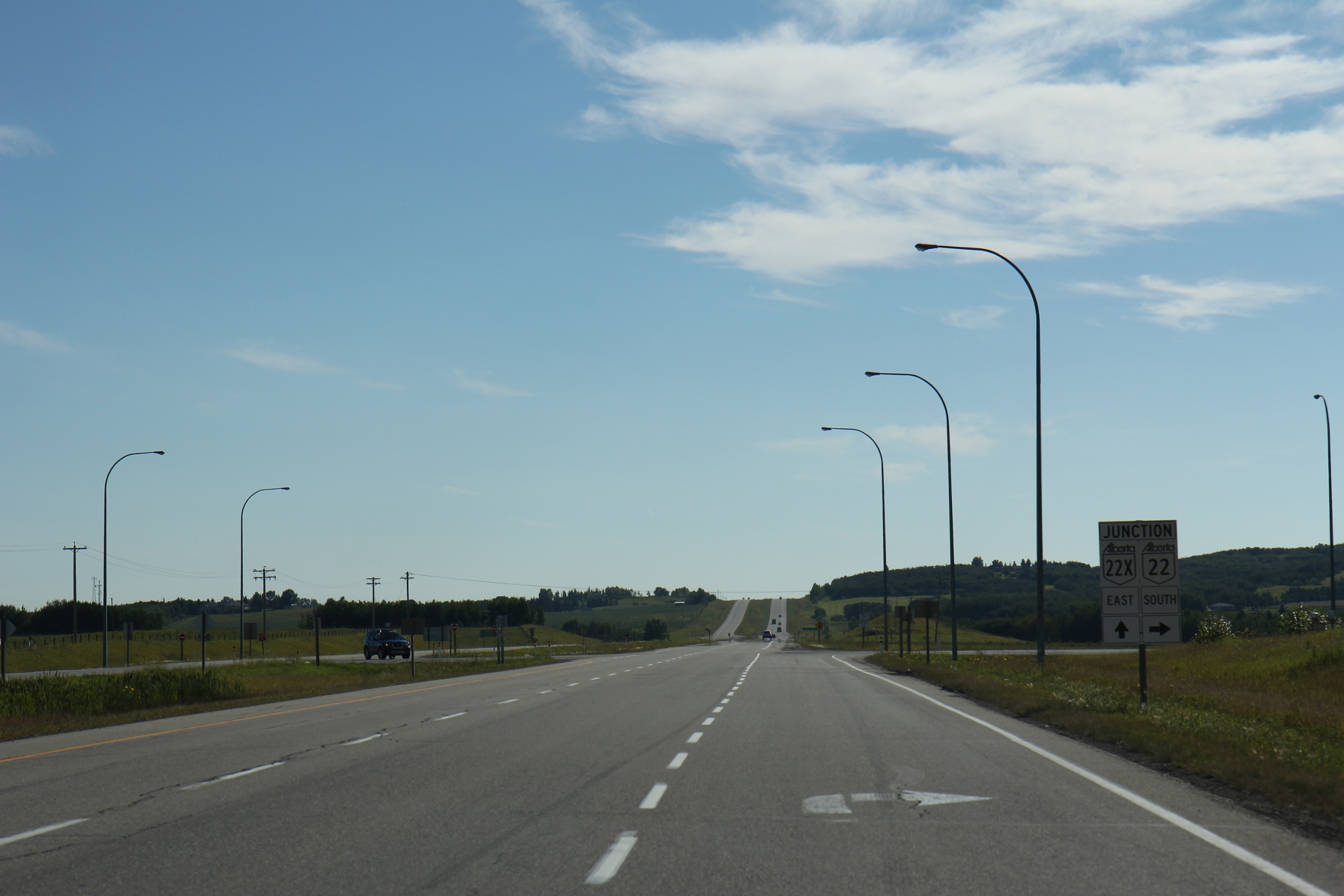
Looking east at the west terminus of Alberta Highway 22X from Alberta Highway 22

Highway 22X is a highway in and around Calgary in the Canadian province of Alberta, extending 54 kilometres (34 mi) to the east from Highway 22. It is concurrent with Stoney Trail (Highway 201) between 53 Street SW and 88 Street SE in Calgary, becoming a freeway and forming the southernmost portion of a ring road around Calgary.

== Route description ==
Highway 22X begins at Highway 22 near Priddis, running east toward Calgary and at 53 Street SW it becomes concurrent with Stoney Trail (Highway 201). It crosses over Macleod Trail towards the Bow River, then over Deerfoot Trail, and the concurrency ends when Stoney Trail branches north and Highway 22X continues east to its end at Highway 24 east of Calgary, continuing to Gleichen as Highway 901.

== History ==
Until it was upgraded in the 2010s as part of the Stoney Trail ring road project, the Marquis of Lorne Trail portion of Highway 22X had earned a reputation of being an accident-prone road. Southward growth of Calgary had turned the small rural highway (it remained a 2-lane rural arterial road for many years) into an urban street that was not suited for high traffic volumes.

Until the late 1990s, all of Highway 22X within the City of Calgary went by the name "Marquis of Lorne Trail" (with the French variant "Marquis de Lorne" used frequently by the city, although signage retained the English version), until the owners of Spruce Meadows successfully lobbied the city to rename the portion west of Macleod Trail after the internationally known show-jumping facility. That portion of 22X is now known as "Spruce Meadows Trail". In 2009, the province announced plans to complete the southeastern portion of Stoney Trail south from Highway 1A. This project included major upgrades to the Marquis of Lorne segment of 22X west from approximately 88th Street to Macleod Trail. Completed in late 2013, the upgrade resulted in the City renaming Marquis of Lorne Trail west of 88 Street as Stoney Trail and the province also re-designated the highway as Highway 201 (the designation of the rest of Stoney Trail).

== Future ==
Alberta Transportation has plans for the Highway 22X corridor to eventually be developed into a freeway.

== Major intersections ==
Rural/specialized municipality	Location	km	mi	Destinations	Notes
Foothills County	Priddis	0.0	0.0	Highway 22 (Cowboy Trail) – Bragg Creek, Millarville, Diamond Valley	Continues as Highway 22 north
City of Calgary		6.5	4.0	85 Street SW / 144 Street W	Calgary city limits; becomes Spruce Meadows Trail
City of Calgary		11.3	7.0	37 Street SW / 96 Street W	Intersection closed; former Highway 773 south
City of Calgary		12.3– 13.7	7.6– 8.5	Stoney Trail (Highway 201)	Interchange; Highway 201 exit 10
City of Calgary		Gap in route			
City of Calgary		27.8	17.3	Stoney Trail (Highway 201) / 88 Street SE	Interchange; Highway 201 exit 96; no access to 88 Street SE to/from Highway 22X
Rocky View County	Indus	37.4	23.2	Highway 791 north – Chestermere	
Rocky View County		44.2	27.5	Range Road 273 – Langdon	Former Highway 797
Wheatland County		54.1	33.6	Highway 24 – Cheadle, Carseland, Vulcan Highway 901 east – Siksika Nation, Gleichen	Continues as Highway 901 east
1.000 mi = 1.609 km; 1.000 km = 0.621 mi: Closed/former; Incomplete access

== See also ==
- Transportation in Calgary
- Royal eponyms in Canada
