= Anastasia, Alberta =

Locality in Vulcan County

Anastasia
- Unincorporated Community
- Nickname: The Colony
- Location of Anastasia in Alberta
- Coordinates: 50°43′24″N 113°01′55″W
- Country: Canada
- Province: Alberta
- Region: Southern Alberta
- Census division: 5
- Municipal district: Vulcan County
- Founder: Anastasia Holoboff
- Founded: 1926
- Incorporated: September 3, 1901

Government
  - Governing body: Vulcan County Council
- Time zone: UTC-7 (MST)
- Postal code span: TOK 2EO
- Area code: +1-403
- Highways: Highway 547

Anastasia is an unincorporated community in Vulcan County, Alberta, Canada that was once a small Doukhobor settlement. The settlement was located approximately 8 kilometres (5.0 mi) east of Arrowwood on Township Road 205. It may have been named after Princess Anastasia Romanov.

== History ==
In 1924 following the death of Peter Verigin, many Doukhobors of the Brilliant, British Columbia settlement claimed Anastasia F. Holuboff be the successor to Peter. A majority of the Doukhobors community disagreed and declared that the Verigin's son should become the new leader for the settlement. In 1926, Anastasia along with 160 of her followers broke away from the settlement to land that was bought two miles (3 km) west of the community of Shouldice, Alberta, where the new break-away communal settlement was formed.

== Notable people ==
- Anastasia F. Holoboff, leader of the Doukhobor commune and founder of Anastasia.

== See also ==
- List of communities in Alberta
- Block settlement
- Doukhobor

http://www.larrysdesk.com/alberta-ccubshouldice-archive.html
