= Pageant, Alberta =

Locality in Alberta

Pageant
- Locality
- Interactive map of Pageant
- Coordinates: 50°29′21″N 112°50′52″W
- Country: Canada
- Province: Alberta
- Municipal district: Vulcan County
- Time zone: MST (UTC−7)
  - Summer (DST): MDT (UTC−6)
- Area codes: 403, 587, 825

Pageant is an locality in Vulcan County, Alberta, Canada. It is located 12 km (7.5 mi) south of the Village of Milo, on the eastern shore of McGregor Lake at the intersection of Township Road 180 and Range Road 214. Pageant has suffered from depopulation since the mid-1920s and very little remains of the original townsite. However, many cabins and recreation homes have recently been built along the lake at the site.

The community was named by the Canadian Pacific Railway.

== See also ==
- List of communities in Alberta
