= James Duncan McGregor =

Canadian politician

The Honourable James Duncan McGregor

11th Lieutenant Governor of Manitoba
- In office January 25, 1929 – December 1, 1934
- Monarch: George V
- Governors General: The Earl of Willingdon; The Earl of Bessborough
- Premier: John Bracken
- Preceded by: Theodore Arthur Burrows
- Succeeded by: William Johnston Tupper

Personal details
- Born: August 29, 1860 Amherstburg, Canada West
- Died: March 15, 1935 (aged 74) Winnipeg, Manitoba
- Occupation: agricultural pioneer

James Duncan McGregor (August 29, 1860 – March 15, 1935) was a Canadian agricultural pioneer and officeholder. He served as the 11th Lieutenant Governor of Manitoba between 1929 and 1934.

McGregor was born in Amherstburg, Canada West (now Ontario), and was educated at public schools in Windsor but did not attend college. He moved to Manitoba in 1877, and worked in his father's cattle business in Brandon.

McGregor was one of several pioneers to the Yukon following the Klondike Gold Rush of 1896, and served as Mine Inspector of the Yukon Territory from 1897 to 1899. He subsequently bought a ranch near Medicine Hat (now in Alberta), and owned 800 km^{2} (200,000 acres) with 10,000 head of cattle and 2,000 horses. For ten years, McGregor also managed the British-owned Canada Land and Irrigation Company and helped build reservoirs and canal systems near Milo, in Vulcan County, Alberta. McGregor Lake, a 40-kilometre (25 mi)-long irrigation reservoir in the Oldman River drainage basin, was named for McGregor.

McGregor gained international fame for his pioneering efforts in stock breeding. He was the first farmer to cultivate alfalfa in the western provinces, thereby reducing the region's dependency on the wheat market. He also founded the Glencarnock stock farms of western Canada, and won a number of international livestock prizes.

McGregor never actually ran for public office, despite repeated entreaties. In 1915, he declined an appointment as Minister of Agriculture in Manitoba. Two years later, he was appointed wartime leader of the Food Control Board in the western provinces, holding the position for a year.

When Theodore Arthur Burrows died in 1929, McGregor was called to succeed him as Manitoba's Lieutenant-Governor (a largely ceremonial position, though McGregor was significant in being the first non-politician to be so appointed). He held this position for five years, and died shortly thereafter.
