= Speargrass, Alberta =

Speargrass
- Unincorporated community
- Location of Speargrass Speargrass (Canada)
- Coordinates: 50.839°N 113.429°W
- Country: Canada
- Province: Alberta
- Census division: No. 5
- Municipal district: Wheatland County

Government
  - Type: Unincorporated
  - Governing body: Wheatland County Council

Area (2021)
  - Land: 0.77 km^{2} (0.30 sq mi)

Population (2021)
  - Total: 275
  - Density: 355.7/km^{2} (921/sq mi)
- Time zone: UTC−06:00 (Alberta Time)
- Area codes: 403, 587, 825
- Highways: 24 and 817
- Waterways: Bow River

Speargrass is an unincorporated place in the Canadian province of Alberta within Wheatland County that is recognized as a designated place by Statistics Canada. It is approximately 50 km (31 mi) southeast of downtown Calgary and 20 km (12 mi) south of Strathmore.

== History ==
The community of Speargrass was approved for development by Wheatland County on December 12, 1997 through its adoption of the Speargrass Area Structure Plan (ASP). The first residential subdivision was registered in 2003.

== Geography ==
Speargrass is on the north side of the Bow River at the intersection of Highway 24 and Highway 817.

== Demographics ==
In the 2021 Census of Population conducted by Statistics Canada, Speargrass had a population of 275 living in 114 of its 117 total private dwellings, a change of 2.2% from its 2016 population of 269. With a land area of 0.77 km^{2} (0.30 sq mi), it had a population density of 357.1/km^{2} (925.0/sq mi) in 2021.

== Attractions ==
The community of Speargrass is surrounded by the Speargrass Golf Course. The 18-hole golf course opened in 2003. The Wyndham-Carseland Provincial Park is to the south of Speargrass across the Bow River.
