= Palliser Regional Division No. 26 =

School district in Alberta, Canada

Location
- 101, 3305 - 18 Avenue North; Lethbridge, Alberta, Canada
- Coordinates: 49.7229°N 112.7899°W (Lethbridge HQ)

District information
- Superintendent: Tom Hamer

Students and staff
- Students: 8,400

Other information
- Website: www.pallisersd.ab.ca

Palliser Regional Division No. 26 or Palliser Regional Schools is a public school authority within the Canadian province of Alberta operating out of Lethbridge. The Palliser School Division services approximately 8,400 students across southern Alberta with 15 community schools, 17 Hutterian colony schools, 11 faith-based alternative schools, ten of which are in Calgary on nine different campuses, five outreach programs, an online school, and four Low German Mennonite alternative programs.

== Schools ==
=== Community Schools ===
- Arrowwood Community School, Arrowwood (1-9)
- Barons School, Barons (PK-6)
- Carmangay School, Carmangay (7-12)
- Champion School, Champion (K-9)
- Coalhurst Elementary School, Coalhurst (PK-6)
- Coalhurst High School, Coalhurst (7-12)
- County Central High School, Vulcan (7-12)
- Dorothy Dalgliesh School, Picture Butte (PK-6)
- Huntsville School, Iron Springs (PK-12)
- Jennie Emery Elementary School, Coaldale (K-3)
- John Davidson School, Coaldale (PK-12)
- Milo Community School, Milo (1-9)
- Noble Central School, Nobleford (PK-12)
- Picture Butte High School, Picture Butte (7-12)
- R.I. Baker School, Coaldale (4-6)
- Sunnyside School, Lethbridge County (K-6)
- Vulcan Prairieview Elementary School, Vulcan (PK-6)

==== Alternative/Outreach Schools ====
- Brant Christian School, Brant (K-12)
- Calgary Christian School, Calgary (PK-12)
- Horizon Leadership Academy, Calgary (PK-9)
- Master's Academy & College, Calgary (K-12)
- Menno Simons Christian School, Calgary (K-9)
- National Sport School, Calgary (8-12)
- Palliser Beyond Borders Home Education

=== Hutterian Colony Schools ===
==== Dariusleut ====
- Albion Ridge Colony School
- Allenby School (Wilson Colony)
- Arrowwood Colony School
- Chin Lake School (Lakeside Colony)
- Gold Ridge School (Turin Colony)
- Hofmann School (New York Colony)
- Keho Lake Colony School
- Springridge School (Carmangay Colony)
- Shadow Ranch Colony School
- White Lake Colony School

==== Lehrerleut ====
- Brant Colony School
- Mialta Colony School
- New Dale Colony School
- River Bend Colony School
- Rock Lake Colony School
- Sky Light Colony School
- Wild Rose Colony School

== See also ==
- List of school authorities in Alberta
