= Shouldice, Alberta =

Shouldice
- Hamlet
- Location of Shouldice Shouldice (Canada)
- Coordinates: 50°43′00″N 112°58′26″W
- Country: Canada
- Province: Alberta
- Region: Southern Alberta
- Census division: 5
- Municipal district: Vulcan County

Government
  - Type: Unincorporated
  - Governing body: Vulcan County Council

Area
  - Land: 19 ha (48 acres)

Population (2007)
  - Total: 7
- Time zone: UTC−06:00 (Alberta Time)
- Area codes: 403, 587, 825

Shouldice is a hamlet in southern Alberta, Canada within Vulcan County.

== Toponymy ==
The hamlet is named after James Shouldice, rancher and philanthropist who operated a 1,700-acre ranch and farm in the area between 1906 and 1925.

In 1911, Shouldice also gave his name to Shouldice Terrace, a community near Calgary. Postal delivery errors were a frequent problem for residents of both the hamlet of Shouldice and Shouldice Terrace. After the Canadian Post Office refused to grant Shouldice Terrace a post office with the same name as the hamlet, its name was changed to Montgomery in 1943.

== Geography ==
Shouldice is located approximately 16 kilometres (9.9 mi) south of Highway 1 and 85 kilometres (53 mi) southeast of Calgary. The hamlet rests along the southwestern border of the Siksika 146 reserve of the Siksika Nation.

The Canada Land Inventory assesses the quality of Shouldice's chernozemic soil to have "moderately severe" limitations for agriculture. It is within the watershed of the Bow River.

== Demographics ==
A population of 7 was recorded for Shouldice in Vulcan County's 2007 municipal census. As of December 2025, the hamlet contains eleven residences.

== History ==
=== Founding and naming: 1880-1925 ===
From at least the 1880s, lands around the communities later known as Gleichen and Namaka were in use by farmers, who ran individual or syndicated operations. James Shouldice, an Ontario-born agriculturalist who wanted to relocate to Alberta for health reasons, took out an initial five-year lease of 13,000 acres in the Namaka area in 1900. After the lease expired in 1905, he bought 1,700 acres in the region, then purchased the land today known as the hamlet of Shouldice in 1906.

Shouldice's operation, located around 40 kilometres from Namaka, was known as Shouldice Farm by 1910. A locality developed around the farms in the area, leading to the opening of a community hall in 1924 and generating demand for postal services. Local hardware store proprietor John W. McRae and his wife, Peggy, established a post office inside their shop in March 1925 under the name Shouldice, extending the farm's name to the hamlet.

James Shouldice died shortly afterwards in May; he attended to his farm until his death. In June, a Canadian Pacific Railway station opened in Shouldice, facilitating easier crop exports by farmers in the locality. Businesses that opened in Shouldice over the rest of the decade included a hotel, restaurant, and several stores.

=== Early development: 1926-1943 ===
In the early 20th century, thousands of Doukhobors, a Russian-origin Spiritual Christian sect with strong pacifist beliefs, relocated to Western Canada. Led by their spiritual leader Peter Verigin, they established communes in Saskatchewan and Southern Alberta between 1898 and 1924. Following Verigin's assassination in British Columbia in October 1924, a power struggle emerged between his son and his companion, Anastasia Holoboff, who claimed Verigin had tutored her to succeed him.

In 1926, Holoboff and around 165 of her followers broke away from the wider community to form a new agricultural colony in Shouldice, named the "Lordly Christian Community of Universal Brotherhood". By 1930, the colony established a school, community prayer building, cemetery, and blacksmith in Shouldice. Beginning in 1929, Shouldice received telephone services through Alberta Government Telephones. Owing to the hamlet's development, almost 400 Doukhobors lived near Shouldice as of the 1931 census, representing half of all sect members in Alberta.

Nevertheless, successive crop failures and the economic pressures of the Great Depression prompted most Doukhobors to relocate by the end of the decade, even with the introduction of an irrigation system to Shouldice in the 1930s. Furthermore, in 1938, the colony's communal land was repossessed by the Government of Alberta over unpaid debts. Some Doukhobors stayed in Shouldice to maintain independent farms, and five grain elevators operated in the hamlet by the end of the 1930s, though one was short-lived.

=== Later 20th century: 1940-2000 ===
Residents of Shouldice were among the Albertans who enlisted to fight for Canada during the Second World War.

Shouldice's school, founded by the Doukhobors and attended by children from all demographics in Shouldice, closed in 1943 due to a shortage of teachers willing to work in the area. Holoboff relocated to Calgary, effectively ending the formal presence of the Lordly Christian Community. A Sunday school opened in 1949, but it relocated to Arrowwood in 1956 after experiencing frequent disruptions due to poor weather.

Two of the hamlet's four grain elevators closed in 1968, followed two years later by Shouldice's post office, which ceased operations in February 1970 due to declining demand and population. The hamlet's final pair of active grain elevators ceased operations in 1978. The next year, Shouldice's community club went dormant due to low membership.

A history of Shouldice and surrounding areas, Furrows of Time, was published by the Arrowwood-Mossleigh Historical Society in 1982.

=== 21st century: 2001-present ===
In August 2014, Shouldice was recorded as containing ten residences with civic addresses. This rose to eleven by the end of 2025.

== Governance and services ==
=== Governance ===
Shouldice is within the jurisdiction of the municipal government of Vulcan County.

=== Services ===
In 2022, the provincial and federal governments announced an investment to expand high-speed internet access to Alberta's rural communities, including Shouldice.

As of 2025, Shouldice belongs to the Palliser Regional Division No. 26 public school authority. Mail services are provided from Medicine Hat, and federal police services operate out of Gleichen. The hamlet receives access to electricity via natural gas generation through its membership of the Sunshine Gas Co-Op.

In its July 2025 development plan, Vulcan County announced plans to extend a regional waterline to Shouldice.

== See also ==
- List of communities in Alberta
- List of hamlets in Alberta
