= Queenstown, Alberta =

Hamlet in Alberta, Canada

Queenstown
- Hamlet
- Location of Queenstown Queenstown (Canada)
- Coordinates: 50°38′22″N 112°56′22″W
- Country: Canada
- Province: Alberta
- Region: Southern Alberta
- Census division: 5
- Municipal district: Vulcan County

Government
  - Type: Unincorporated
  - Governing body: Vulcan County Council

Population (2007)
  - Total: 8
- Time zone: UTC−06:00 (Alberta Time)
- Area codes: 403, 587, 825

Queenstown is a hamlet in southern Alberta, Canada within Vulcan County. It is located approximately 26 kilometres (16 mi) south of Highway 1, and 92 kilometres (57 mi) southeast of Calgary.

== Toponymy ==
Queenstown was named by Irish-born Edward Dawson, employee of the Dominion Land Survey, after his home city of Queenstown in Ireland (today Cobh).

The Blackfoot name for Queenstown is niináwaakii, meaning queen, derived from the settler name.

== History ==
=== Founding: 1888-1925 ===
In 1888, Irish-born Edward Dawson, employee of the Dominion Land Survey, came across the future Queenstown site when reviewing the area. He formed the Canadian Pacific Colonization Company shortly afterwards, to promote settlement in the Snake Valley.

Although Dawson himself left Queenstown by 1889, promotion for the settlement was successful enough that a farming community had developed by 1907. A post office opened for Queenstown in January 1908, with original settler William Brown serving as the first postmaster. Queenstown School was established later that year, in April. By 1911, Queenstown and its surrounding areas boasted more than 600 residents.

Also in 1918, a small population of Doukhobors, a religious group of Russian origin, founded a village bordering Queenstown, named Krasivaya Dolina. They founded a cemetery as well, though only two people would be interred there by 1924, when the village was abandoned.

=== Development and decline: 1926-1969 ===
The Canadian Pacific Railway established a stop a few miles north-west of Queenstown in 1926, and Queenstown effectively moved closer to the railway line in the next few years, including the school building. The post office began operating from a general store, and a community hall opened to provide recreational programming.

Frequent drought affected Queenstown's agricultural economy, and, by 1931, the community had declined in population to 125 residents. By this time, amenities established in Queenstown included a hotel, barber shop, bank, general stores, and a restaurant. Following the Second World War, Queenstown became host to a chapter of the Royal Canadian Legion and a small library.

After Queenstown School closed in 1952, many of the community's residents relocated to Milo or surrounding localities; this effectively ended Queenstown's commercial operations within a decade. By the end of the 1950s, Queenstown's post office had gone through six postmasters in about a decade, as successive holders of the office and Queenstown's general store struggled to be commercially viable. An exception to the community's declining fortunes was the 1960 opening of the Queenstown Seed Cleaning Plant, which retained employment in the area.

Krasivaya Dolina Cemetery was cleared in the 1960s, removing all markers of its two graves.

=== Later development: 1970-present ===
After Queenstown's post office closed in June 1970, parcel and special delivery services moved to Milo. In 1971, Queenstown's Women's Institute petitioned Vulcan County to demolish the many buildings that had stood dormant in Queenstown for around a decade, including its hotel.

Queenstown Community Hall held its final event, a New Year's dance, in December 1990. Train and grain elevator services to Queenstown ended by the late 1990s, and the Queenstown Seed Cleaning Plant relocated to Milo in 1993.

Calgary-based oil and natural gas company, Pulse Oil Corp, introduced an oilfield in the Queenstown area in 2017. The operation remains active as of 2026. In 2023, the federal and provincial governments announced funding to bring high-speed Internet access to rural communities including Queenstown.

== Climate ==
Climate data for Queenstown
| Month | Jan | Feb | Mar | Apr | May | Jun | Jul | Aug | Sep | Oct | Nov | Dec | Year |
|---|---|---|---|---|---|---|---|---|---|---|---|---|---|
| Record high °C (°F) | 16 (61) | 23.5 (74.3) | 22.2 (72.0) | 29.5 (85.1) | 34 (93) | 34.5 (94.1) | 37.5 (99.5) | 37.5 (99.5) | 36.5 (97.7) | 31.1 (88.0) | 22.2 (72.0) | 21.5 (70.7) | 37.5 (99.5) |
| Mean daily maximum °C (°F) | −3.7 (25.3) | −0.5 (31.1) | 4.5 (40.1) | 12.2 (54.0) | 17.7 (63.9) | 21.8 (71.2) | 24.7 (76.5) | 24.4 (75.9) | 18.7 (65.7) | 13 (55) | 2.9 (37.2) | −2 (28) | 11.2 (52.2) |
| Daily mean °C (°F) | −9.4 (15.1) | −6.3 (20.7) | −1.4 (29.5) | 5.4 (41.7) | 10.8 (51.4) | 15 (59) | 17.6 (63.7) | 17.1 (62.8) | 11.6 (52.9) | 6 (43) | −2.7 (27.1) | −7.8 (18.0) | 4.6 (40.3) |
| Mean daily minimum °C (°F) | −15.1 (4.8) | −12.2 (10.0) | −7.4 (18.7) | −1.5 (29.3) | 3.8 (38.8) | 8.2 (46.8) | 10.4 (50.7) | 9.7 (49.5) | 4.5 (40.1) | −1 (30) | −8.4 (16.9) | −13.7 (7.3) | −1.9 (28.6) |
| Record low °C (°F) | −37.2 (−35.0) | −36.7 (−34.1) | −32.5 (−26.5) | −20.6 (−5.1) | −7.8 (18.0) | −1 (30) | 1.1 (34.0) | −3 (27) | −8.3 (17.1) | −25 (−13) | −33.5 (−28.3) | −39.4 (−38.9) | −39.4 (−38.9) |
| Average precipitation mm (inches) | 21.4 (0.84) | 17.4 (0.69) | 24.6 (0.97) | 30.6 (1.20) | 58 (2.3) | 63.8 (2.51) | 54.3 (2.14) | 49 (1.9) | 40 (1.6) | 17.6 (0.69) | 18.3 (0.72) | 21.3 (0.84) | 416.2 (16.39) |
Source: Environment Canada

== Demographics ==
Population history of Queenstown
| Year | Pop. | ±% |
|---|---|---|
| 1911 | 666 | — |
| 1941 | 85 | −87.2% |
| 1951 | 73 | −14.1% |
| 1956 | 83 | +13.7% |
| 1961 | 67 | −19.3% |
| 1966 | 53 | −20.9% |
| 1971 | 30 | −43.4% |
| 1981 | 28 | −6.7% |
| 1986 | 20 | −28.6% |
| 1991 | 15 | −25.0% |
Source: Statistics Canada

The population of Queenstown according to the 2007 municipal census conducted by Vulcan County is 8.

== See also ==
- List of communities in Alberta
- List of hamlets in Alberta
