= Wyndham-Carseland Provincial Park =

Provincial park in Alberta, Canada

- Location within Alberta
- Interactive map of Wyndham-Carseland Provincial Park
- Location: Wheatland County / Vulcan County, Alberta Canada
- Nearest city: Strathmore
- Coordinates: 50°49′54″N 113°25′47″W
- Area: 2.4 km^{2} (0.93 sq mi)
- Established: May 02, 1979
- Governing body: Alberta Environment and Parks; Operated by Amherst Ent. Ltd.

Wyndham-Carseland Provincial Park is a provincial park in Alberta, Canada, located 24.5 km (15.2 mi) south of Strathmore and 4 km (2.5 mi) south of Carseland, along Highway 24.

== Location ==
This provincial park is situated on both shores of the Bow River, at an elevation of 910 m (2,990 ft) and has an area of 2.4 km^{2} (0.93 sq mi). It was established on May 2, 1979, and is maintained by Alberta Environment and Parks.

== Fauna ==
It is home to a diverse selection of wildlife including northern Rocky Mountain wolves, North American beavers, western moose, black bears, a large variety of birds, coyotes, mule deer, and grizzly bears. The Bow River from the Carseland Weir to the Highway 24 bridge holds a number of game fish species including brown and rainbow trout, northern pike and Rocky Mountain whitefish. Fishing regulations are enforced by Alberta Fish and Wildlife officers.

== Campground closure ==
Wyndham-Carseland campground was affected by the June 2013 floods in Southern Alberta and was closed until 2015.

== See also ==
- List of provincial parks in Alberta
- List of Canadian provincial parks
- List of National Parks of Canada
