= Travers, Alberta =

Travers
- Hamlet
- Location within Alberta
- Coordinates: 50.243°N 112.556°W
- Country: Canada
- Province: Alberta
- Region: Southern Alberta
- Census division: 5
- Municipal district: County of Vulcan
- Founded: 1914

Government
  - Governing body: Vulcan County Council

Population (2007)
  - Total: 0
- Time zone: UTC−06:00 (Alberta Time)
- Postal code span: T0L 1G0
- Area code: +1-403

Travers is a ghost town and hamlet in southern Alberta, Canada within Vulcan County. It is located approximately 59 kilometres (37 mi) southwest of Highway 1 and 59 kilometres (37 mi) southwest of Brooks.

== Toponymy ==
According to Alberta Culture and historian Harry Sanders, the exact origin of Travers' name is uncertain. One local history of Lomond and surrounding areas suggests Travers was the name of a Canadian Pacific Railway surveyor who worked on the Travers railway siding, which opened for business in 1914.

== History ==
=== Founding, development, and decline: 1900–1949 ===
In the early 1900s, the area later known as Travers was settled by farmers and homesteaders, primarily from Europe and the United States. A graveyard, known today as Travers Cemetery, began receiving interments from the community in 1911.

In 1914, the Canadian Pacific Railway (CPR) established a railway siding named Travers, which became the toponym of its surrounding locality. Travers was part of the Suffield Subdivision. Within months of the siding's establishment, the general store of the nearby locality of Rosemead moved to Travers. In early 1915, Travers effectively absorbed the nearby locale of Sweet Valley, when its post office relocated there and began using the Travers name.

Four grain elevators were soon built at Travers, and other businesses that opened in the locality included a barbershop, two hardware stores, and a branch of the Standard Bank of Canada. A hotel began operating in 1916, and Travers School opened in December 1920. Men living in Travers formed a baseball team that competed against residents of nearby settlements, including Retlaw and Taber. At its height, Travers boasted a population of approximately 300.

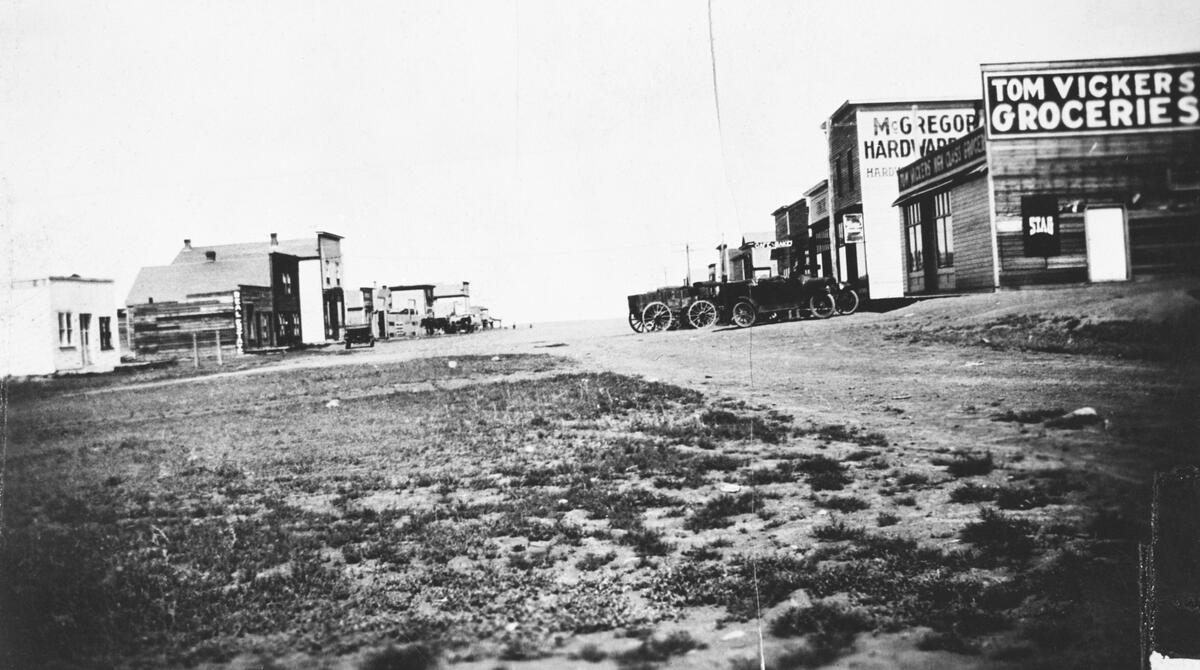
Travers, photographed in 1922.

Travers' early rapid growth proved to be short-lived, owing to dry weather that stunted its primarily agricultural economy. Its hotel ceased operations in the early 1920s, and its bank branch closed in 1926. A combination of the Great Depression and Dust Bowl in the early 1930s further depopulated Travers and the greater Lomond district. One local history described Travers' decline as follows: "[In] the dry depression years... Travers began to dwindle as did so much of our district. It is now under the ditch".

Travers School became part of the Taber School Division No. 6 in 1937.

=== Later developments: 1950–present ===
Beginning in 1954, Travers became part of the Municipal District of Taber. Travers' name was approved for federal mapping purposes in 1957; its population was recorded as 50 the following year.

In August 1959, the Taber municipal government ordered for 10 students living between Travers and Enchant to be bussed to school in Enchant, rather than Travers. At this time, Travers School had 35 students. Parents boycotted the move and refused to send their children to Enchant for a month, fearing that acquiescing would ultimately result in Travers School closing permanently. Although Taber initially agreed to maintain bus routes to Travers, an agreement could not be reached to the residents' satisfaction by early 1960. Travers subsequently requested to be governed by Vulcan County. Although this was accepted in February 1960, Travers School would close by November 1961; Vulcan County put its buildings up for sale.

By 1965, Travers' commercial operations consisted of one general store that also functioned as its post office. The post office closed permanently in October 1966. In 1976, writer Harold Fryer described Travers as a ghost town populated by a handful of residents, with several of the original buildings abandoned. By 2000, the Suffield railway line running through the area had ceased operations.

The Travers Solar Project, a photovoltaic power station, began operating near Travers in 2022.

== Places of interest ==
Travers Reservoir, located 20 km from the site, is named for Travers. Surrounding the reservoir is Travers Reservoir Provincial Recreation Area, which contains a campground maintained by Alberta Parks as of 2026.

== Demographics ==
Travers recorded a population of 0 at the time of Vulcan County's 2007 municipal census. As of 2025, the original Travers site contains several properties and farms.

== See also ==
- List of communities in Alberta
- List of hamlets in Alberta
