= Aspen Crossing Railway =

Heritage railway in Alberta, Canada

Coordinates: 50.717194°N 113.351642°W

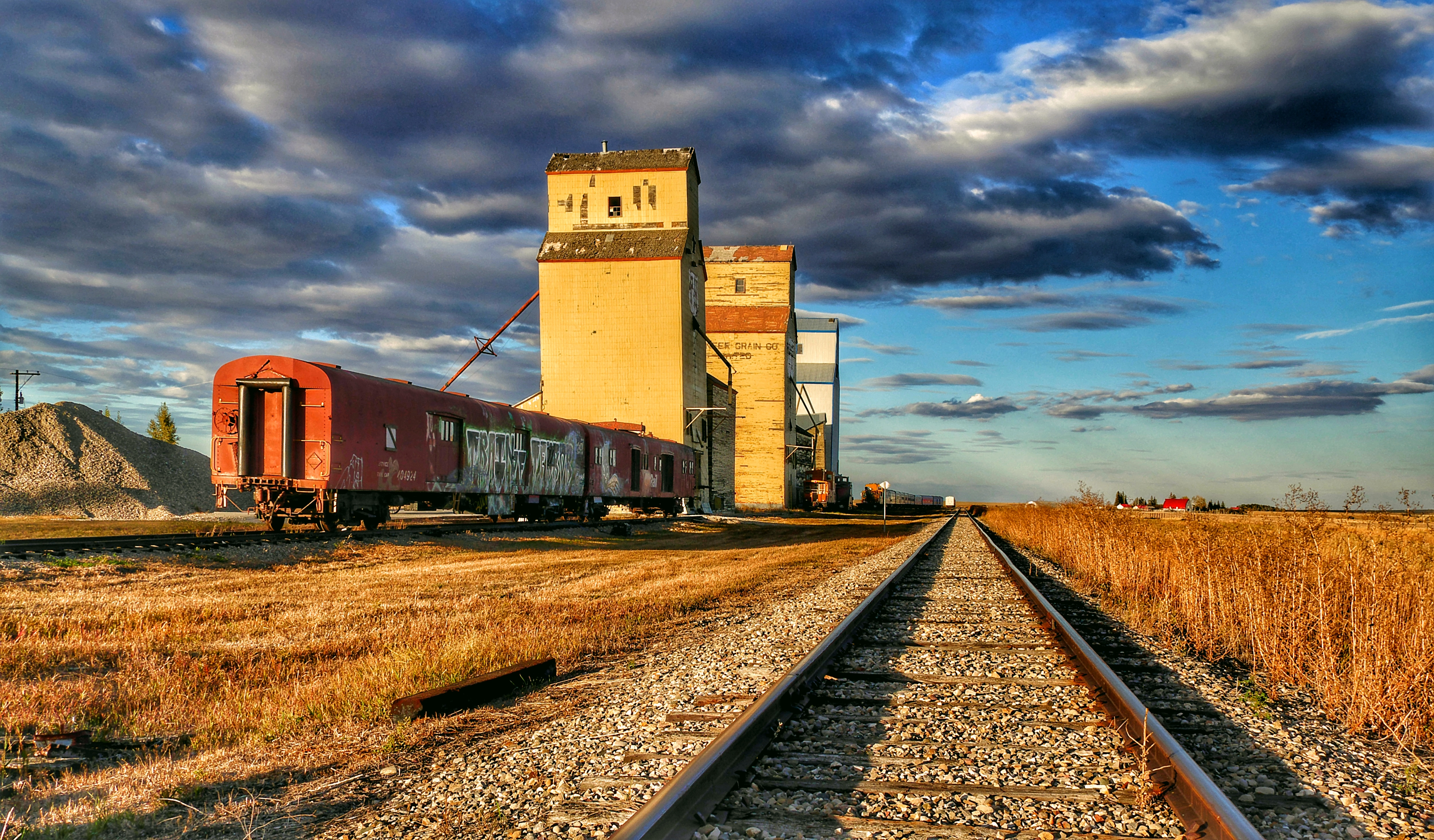
- Aspen Crossing Railway Mossleigh
- Locale: Southern Alberta, Canada
- Terminus: Arrowwood, Alberta

Commercial operations
- Name: ex-CPR Lomond Spur
- Built by: Canadian Pacific Railway
- Original gauge: 1,435 mm (4 ft 8 1/2 in)

Preserved operations
- Stations: 1
- Length: 13.9 mi (22.4 km)
- Preserved gauge: 1,435 mm (4 ft 8 1/2 in)

Preservation history
- Headquarters: Mossleigh

Website
- Aspen Crossing Railway

The Aspen Crossing Railway is a heritage railway in Southern Alberta, southeast of Calgary.

In 2002 the last CP train ran through Mossleigh in southeastern Alberta. After 6 years of negotiations, Jason Thornhill, the creator of Aspen Crossing, was successful at saving and securing the rights to 14 miles of rail line. By May 2015 the Aspen Crossing Railway made its inaugural run with over 100 guests and patrons coming out to celebrate the latest addition to Aspen Crossing.

Aspen Crossing Railway offers several differently-themed train excursions, including Wine and Cheese, Ales on Rails, Circus Train, Dinner Theatre and Champagne Brunch. The average train excursion runs between 2 and 4 hours.

Some train tours include food, while others have food and beverages available for purchase. Aspen Crossing was also the first in Alberta to be authorized to offer The Polar Express™ Train Ride based on the book and movie of the same name. The Aspen Crossing Railway is also the first Halloween Haunt on rails in Canada under the name of "The Train of Terror".

== See also ==
- List of heritage railways in Canada
