= McGregor Lake =

Reservoir in Vulcan County, Southern Alberta, Canada

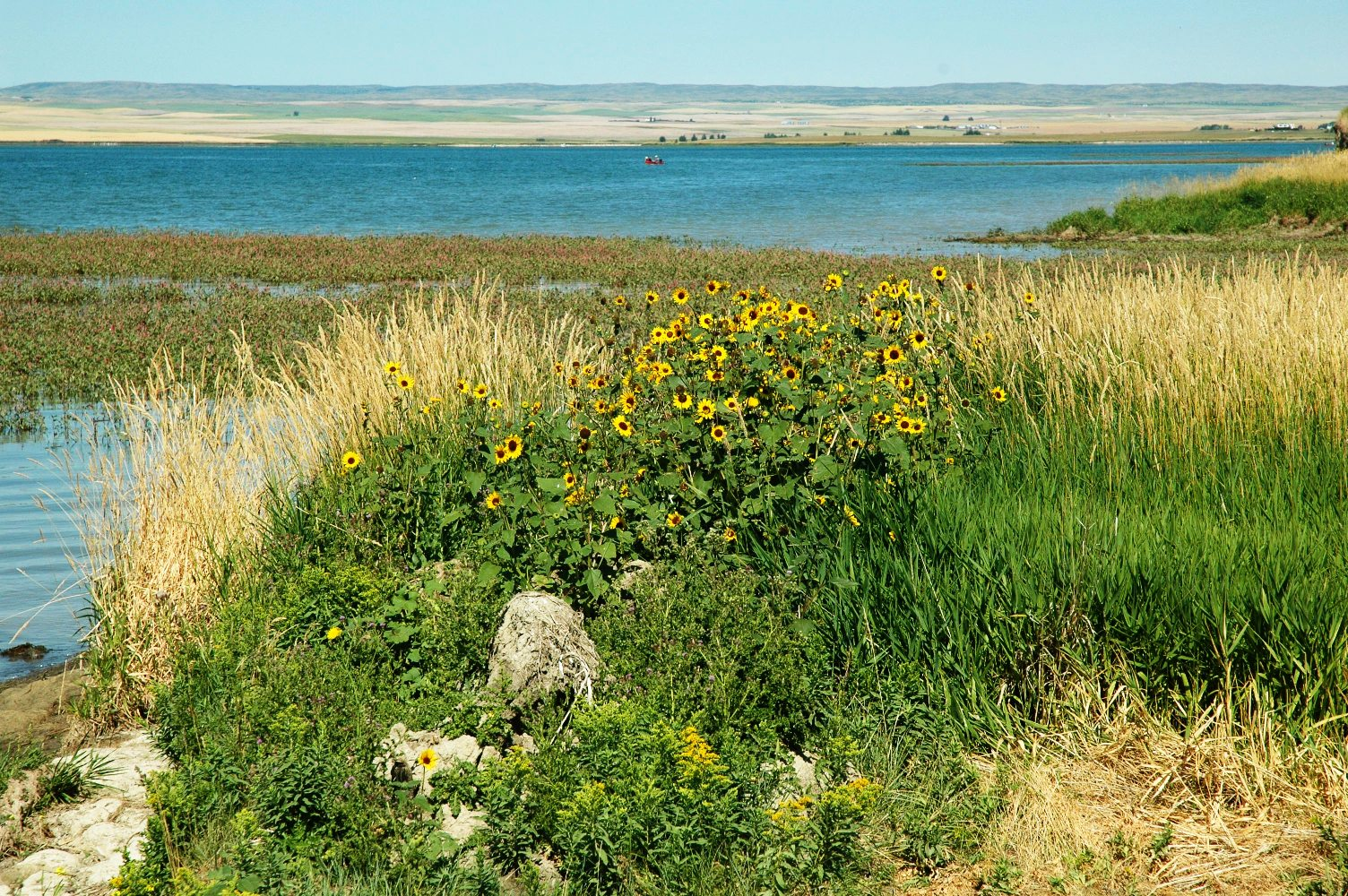
- East Bank

- Location within Alberta
- Location: Vulcan County, Southern Alberta
- Coordinates: 50°25′26″N 112°51′06″W
- Type: Reservoir
- Primary inflows: Oldman River and Bow River (via canal)
- Primary outflows: Bow River
- Catchment area: 993 km^{2} (383 sq mi)
- Basin countries: Canada
- Max. length: 40 km (25 mi)
- Max. width: 2 km (1.2 mi)
- Surface area: 51.4 km^{2} (19.8 sq mi)
- Average depth: 6.5 m (21 ft)
- Max. depth: 9.7 m (32 ft)
- Surface elevation: 868 m (2,848 ft)
- Settlements: Milo

McGregor Lake is an elongated (40 by 2 km or 24.9 by 1.2 mi) reservoir in Southern Alberta. McGregor Lake was created in 1920 by the completion of two dams bracketing water flowing through in Snake Valley. It is situated 100 km (62 mi) southeast of Calgary in the Vulcan County.

The reservoir is part of the Carseland-Bow River Headworks System owned and operated by Alberta Environment and Parks and delivers water to the Bow River Irrigation District. McGregor Lake is in the Oldman River drainage basin, but most water in it arrives via canals from the Bow River. The reservoir was built by British-owned Canada Land and Irrigation Company and named after J. D. McGregor, the company's Canadian manager who became Lieutenant Governor of Manitoba in 1929.

== History ==
The reservoir occupies part of the Snake Valley, prehistorically, a thoroughfare for members of the Blackfoot Confederacy. The first European settlers arrived mid-nineteenth century. Ranching was well established by the 1880s. Shortly after, homesteading and farming were prevalent in the valley. The rich soil and dry climate led to an interest in irrigation. Construction began in 1909 on a major reservoir.

Two dams were built - one in the north near Milo, Alberta and a second, south dam. McGregor Lake was created when the Canada Land and Irrigation Company completed the South and North McGregor dams. Some of the water in the reservoir comes from the Old Man River, but a canal was also constructed to bring water from the Bow River near Carseland. Construction was a ten-year project, the reservoir began filling in 1920. It was administered as a private company until 1950, when the federal Prairie Farm Rehabilitation Administration assumed control and modified the dam into a zoned earthfill structure from its previously homogeneous state. In 1973, McGregor Lake and its control structures were transferred to Alberta Environment.

== Sports and recreation ==
Swimming and boating access is at McGregor Lake Recreation Area (formerly Milo Campground), an Alberta Provincial Park site with camping facilities at the northwest corner of the lake. Amenities include a boat launch, playgrounds, and picnic shelters. Small boats can also be launched at Lomond Crossing, where Secondary Road 531 crosses the lake.

Sport fishing yields Walleye, Yellow Perch, Lake Whitefish, Rainbow Trout, and Northern Pike (Jackfish). Spawning lake whitefish can be seen in October at the sluice gate on the northwest corner of the lake. Local residents have reported catching up to 10 kilogram (22 lb) northern pike.

A campground, picnic area, and boat launch are provided at the north end of the lake.

McGregor Lake has attractive, clear water. Algal concentrations are usually low and do not interfere with recreational use. Activities enjoyed at the lake include picnicking, swimming, fishing, wind surfing, canoeing, water skiing and power boating. A major cottage development has formed in recent years on the east shore of the lake near the village of Milo.

American white pelicans and double-crested cormorants often forage on this large prairie reservoir from April to September.

In spring and fall, the lake is an important staging area for waterfowl, including snow geese, Canada geese and greater white-fronted geese. Blue-winged teals and northern shovelers can be seen in spring and summer. The surrounding dry prairie uplands offer opportunities to observe marbled godwits and long-billed curlews. Prairie plants include such exotic species as the cushion cactus with its burgundy blooms and the prickly pear cactus with its prominent yellow blossoms; both flower in June.

== Agriculture and industry ==
The lake was built for irrigation of farmland. In 2000, the lake had 250,000 acre-feet (310,000,000 m^{3}) of reserves and was at 85% of maximum capacity. This is enough water to provide almost 200 square miles (500 km^{2}) with a typical 24 inches (610 mm) of watering. Most of the irrigation cropland is alfalfa and clover for hay, with canola, corn, and specialty crops also supplied. The land up to the full supply level of the reservoir is Crown, or government-controlled land - plus the Crown also owns about 30% of the land above the full supply level, most of which is leased for grazing.

Since at least 1938, McGregor Lake was fished commercially for northern pike. The lake has been fished commercially for lake whitefish since about 1948. During the 1980s, the mean annual commercial catch was a total annual average of 85,964.3 kg of lake whitefish and northern pike fish. This is 200,000 pounds worth close to a million dollars. A 1982 investigation of pesticide and PCB levels in McGregor Lake fish found that concentrations were low and well below safe consumption limits. McGregor Lake's commercial fishing operations were closed in 2014.

The area around McGregor Lake has significant oil and gas discoveries with many large resource companies active, including Husky, Encana, and Total. On June 13, 2007, a day-long session for observing water-born spill mitigation was held at the south end of McGregor Lake. Alberta Energy and Utilities Board required all companies operating in the area to attend. About one hundred workers watched from behind a roped-off area as crews laid out yellow containment booms and demonstrated methods of containing potential lake spills.
