= Cheadle, Alberta =

Cheadle
- Hamlet
- Location within Alberta
- Coordinates: 51°00′51″N 113°32′35″W
- Country: Canada
- Province: Alberta
- Region: Calgary Region
- Census division: 5
- Municipal district: Wheatland County
- Subdivided: 1906

Government
  - Type: Unincorporated
  - Reeve: Glenn Koester
  - Governing body: Wheatland County Council: Ben Armstrong; Berniece Bland; Alice Booth; Rex Harwood; Brenda Knight; Glenn Koester; Donald Vander Velde
  - Administrative body: Cheadle Community Association

Area (2021)
  - Land: 0.43 km^{2} (0.17 sq mi)
- Elevation: 990 m (3,250 ft)

Population (2021)
  - Total: 83
  - Density: 192.3/km^{2} (498/sq mi)
- Time zone: UTC−06:00 (Alberta Time)
- Postal code: T1P 0X8
- Highways: Highway 24, South of Highway 1
- Website: www.cheadlealberta.ca

Cheadle is a hamlet in Alberta, Canada within Wheatland County. It is located on Highway 24, 2 kilometres (1.2 mi) south of the Highway 1 and approximately 35 kilometers (22 mi) east of the City of Calgary.

Cheadle Airport is located 7.4 kilometres (4.6 mi) northwest of Cheadle. It is a 1,200 meters (3,900 ft) turf airstrip.

== History ==
The Canadian Pacific Railway named the community Cheadle for Walter Butler Cheadle of Milton and Cheadle explorers who travelled across the prairies and Rocky Mountains in the 1860s. Cheadle and Lord Milton were co-authors of the book The North-West Passage by Land (London, 1865), which describes their expedition in considerable detail.

A record was made when laying the railway track between Strathmore and Cheadle when the railway was built. "In one hour a mile of steel was laid. And, at the end of the ten-hour working day, the rails were laid to Cheadle, nine miles and 300 feet [14.58 km] for a record." The ties had been laid the night before.

There was just one minor building in Cheadle when the early ranchers and homesteaders began to arrive in the late 1890s. It was a post office, store, and boarding home, run by Mrs. Florence Belwer for the CPR section-men. Cheadle began to grow in the years 1906–1916 to a hardware store, barbershop, blacksmith, restaurant, pool hall, dance hall, three grocery stores, water tank, CPR station and section houses, stockyards, lumberyard, two grain elevators, and several residences. The CPR had once planned to locate Ogden Shops in Cheadle.

The arrival of the automobile and another CPR line from Gleichen to Calgary, through Carseland and Dalemead, along with the building of the Canadian Northern Railway through Lyalta and Ardenode, quickly halted the growth of Cheadle. A lack of directional sign along Highway 1, indicating Cheadle's location, also contributed to the hamlet's demise. Most travellers became completely unaware of Cheadle's existence, and it was often missed from Alberta maps.

At one time grain was hauled to Cheadle from Carseland. The transport teams ate and rested in Cheadle before returning. This all brought much of the business to Cheadle and raised the total number of grain elevators to three. By 1971, Cheadle's post office and grocery store closed. It was purchased by Fritz Gosteli, a local acreage owner originally from Switzerland, who transformed the building into a two-storey single-family residence. There were two main businesses at that time; Risdon's Tomato Enterprise and Ken Hendry's Manufacturing, which was built two years prior. There were only a few residents at that time: Ken & Leona Hendry, Leon & Kay Risdon and family, Tommy Kildea, Doug & Kathy Davies and family, Fritz & Christine Gosteli and family, Mr. & Mrs. H. V. Iles, Dietrich & Regina Volkmann. Between Cheadle and Highway 1 there was Ken and Bev Jones and family, Mr. & Mrs. M. Landru and family, and Mr. & Mrs. H. McElroy and family, and Mr. & Mrs. E. A. Cobb.

== Demographics ==
Population history of Cheadle
Year	Pop.	±%
1971	14	—
1976	25	+78.6%
1981	78	+212.0%
1986	77	−1.3%
1991	78	+1.3%
1991A	80	+2.6%
1996	66	−17.5%
2001	68	+3.0%
2006	69	+1.5%
2011	84	+21.7%
2016	91	+8.3%
2016R	109	+19.8%
2021	83	−23.9%
Source: Statistics Canada

In the 2021 Census of Population conducted by Statistics Canada, Cheadle had a population of 83 living in 35 of its 36 total private dwellings, a change of −23.9% from its 2016 population of 109. With a land area of 0.43 km^{2} (0.17 sq mi), it had a population density of 193.0/km^{2} (499.9/sq mi) in 2021.

As a designated place in the 2016 Census of Population conducted by Statistics Canada, Cheadle had a population of 91 living in 31 of its 31 total private dwellings, a change of 8.3% from its 2011 population of 84. With a land area of 0.17 km^{2} (0.066 sq mi), it had a population density of 535.3/km^{2} (1,386.4/sq mi) in 2016.

== Statues ==
There is a 5.2-metre-tall (17 ft) statue of a Cheetos corn puff located at 400 Railway Avenue. Unveiled in October 2022, the statue was commissioned by the Cheetos Brand, part of PepsiCo Foods. It was not a permanent fixture, and left Cheadle after November 4, 2022, for a tour around Canada.

== See also ==
- List of communities in Alberta
- List of designated places in Alberta
- List of hamlets in Alberta
- Wheatland County
