= Little Bow Provincial Park =

Provincial park in Alberta, Canada

- Location within Alberta
- Interactive map of Little Bow Provincial Park
- Location: Vulcan County, Alberta Canada
- Nearest city: Champion
- Coordinates: 50°13′49″N 112°55′47″W
- Area: 1.1 km^{2} (0.42 sq mi)
- Established: January 20, 1954
- Governing body: Alberta Tourism, Parks and Recreation

Little Bow Provincial Park is a provincial park located near the town of Vulcan and the village of Champion in Alberta, Canada.

The park is situated at an elevation of 860 m (2,820 ft) and has a surface of 1.1 km^{2} (0.42 sq mi), on Travers Reservoir, an artificial lake formed on Little Bow River, a tributary of the Oldman River. The area is noted for recreational boating and fishing. The Little Bow Reservoir Provincial Recreation Area is an extension of the park. It was established on January 20, 1954 and is maintained by Alberta Tourism, Parks and Recreation.

== Activities ==
The following activities are available in the park:

- Beach activities
- Birdwatching (as part of the "McGregor Lake & Travers Reservoir Important Bird Area")
- Camping
- Canoeing and kayaking
- Group camping
- Horseshoes
- Fishing and ice fishing
- Power boating
- Sailing
- Swimming
- Water-skiing
- Windsurfing

== See also ==
- List of provincial parks in Alberta
- List of Canadian provincial parks
- List of Canadian national parks
