= Priddis, Alberta =

Priddis
- Hamlet
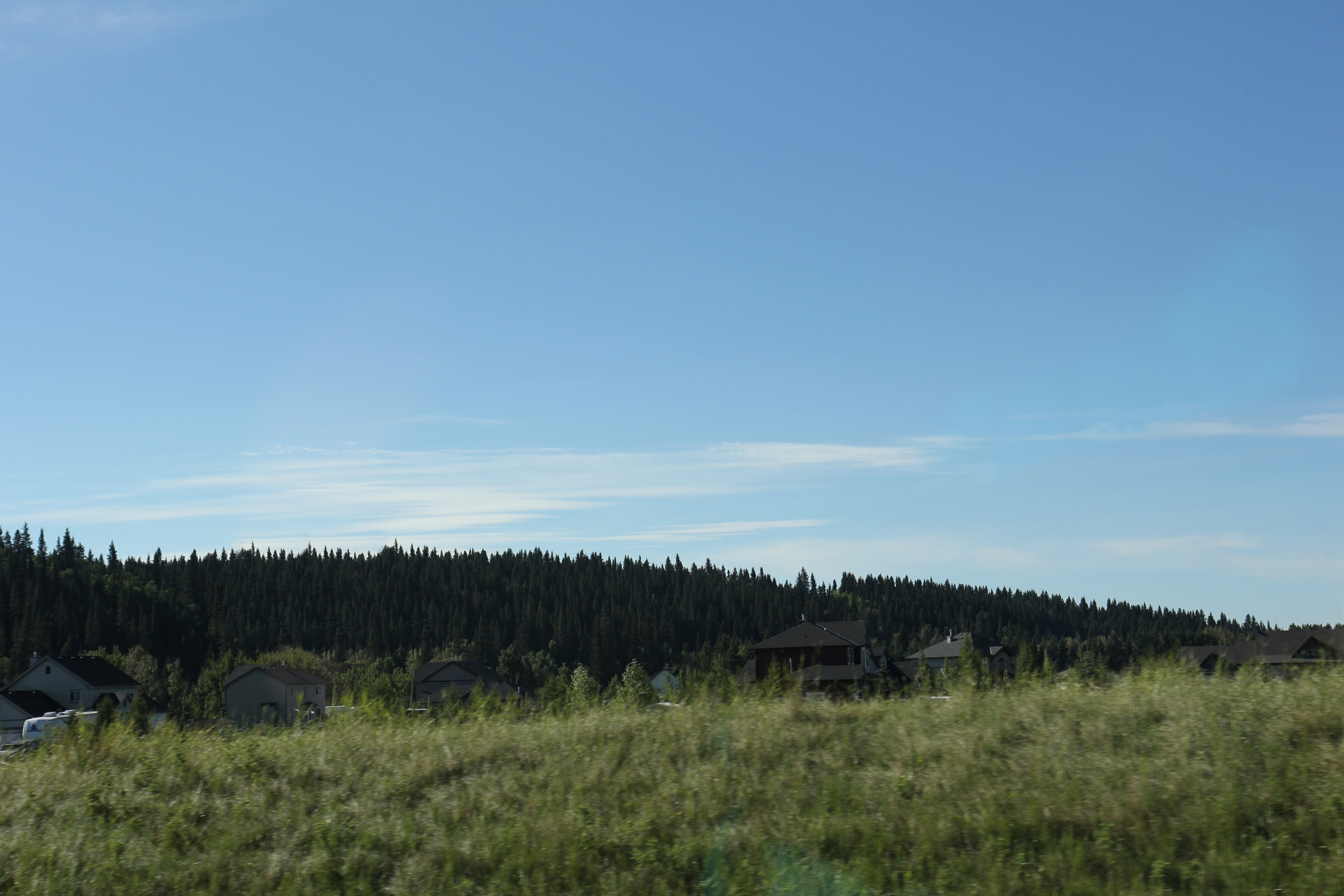
- Panorama of Priddis from the Cowboy Trail

- Location of Priddis in Alberta
- Coordinates: 50.8861°N 114.3294°W
- Country: Canada
- Province: Alberta
- Census division: No. 6
- Municipal district: Foothills County

Government
  - Type: Unincorporated
  - Governing body: Foothills County Council
- Elevation: 1,160 m (3,810 ft)

Population (2003)
  - Total: 79
- Time zone: UTC−06:00 (Alberta Time)
- Website: Priddis Community Association

Priddis is a hamlet in Alberta, Canada within Foothills County. It is located in the foothills of the Canadian Rockies at an elevation of 1,160 metres (3,810 ft). The hamlet is located southwest of the intersection of the Cowboy Trail (Highway 22) and Highway 22X, approximately 10 kilometres (6.2 mi) west of Calgary's city limits.

The hamlet is located in Census Division No. 6 and in the federal riding of Macleod. It was named for Charles Priddis, who homesteaded along the Fish Creek in 1886.

== Demographics ==
The population of Priddis according to the 2003 municipal census conducted by Foothills County is 79.

== See also ==
- List of communities in Alberta
- List of hamlets in Alberta
