= Ron Miksha =

American-Canadian beekeeper, scientist, and author (born 1954

- Born: March 30, 1954 (age 72); Mercer County, Pennsylvania, U.S
- Education: University of Saskatchewan
- Occupations: beekeeper, scientist, author

Ron Miksha (born March 30, 1954) is an American-Canadian beekeeper, scientist, and Canadian author.

== Biography ==
Miksha was born in a farm house in Mercer County, Pennsylvania, one of ten children in a poor rural family living along the edge of the Appalachian Mountains. The family survived by growing potatoes, corn, cabbage, and by keeping bees and selling honey. Miksha learned beekeeping from his parents and older brothers.

In 1975, at age twenty-one, he moved to Saskatchewan, Canada to keep bees. His popular book, Bad Beekeeping, describes the ten years Miksha lived and farmed in Val Marie, Saskatchewan, a remote prairie village surrounded by badlands and large cattle ranches. The area, part of the Palliser Triangle, is prone to extreme drought as depicted in Miksha's book. But Bad Beekeeping is more than a beekeeping narrative. It espouses a strong libertarian '"small government" philosophy and has been both condemned and praised by readers on opposite ends of that discussion. In Hivelights Magazine, Grant Hicks, Alberta representative to the Canadian Honey Council, claims "Bad Beekeeping is the most impressive piece of beekeeping information that has come my way." The book has been influential abroad - the Norwegian heavy metal band Miksha (Half the Battle) derived its name from the book and its author.

Following ten years of Saskatchewan beekeeping, Ron Miksha studied at the University of Saskatchewan, graduating with high honours in geophysics. His undergraduate research work, sponsored by the Natural Sciences and Engineering Research Council of Canada, investigated the atmosphere's effects on the Earth's inner core vibrations. His research work and studies led to a business in Calgary, where Miksha now lives.

In 1998, Ron Miksha began The Beekeeper's Home Pages, one of the first websites dedicated to beekeeping. Dr. Tom Sanford, apiculture specialist for the University of Florida wrote "this web site gets a grade A for its effort to be the definitive web site for beekeeping." Miksha is also a contributor to Bee Culture, American Bee Journal, and Hivelights.

In 2005, with his brother Don and other family members, Ron Miksha formed Summit Gardens Honey Farms Ltd., Canada's largest producer of comb honey. Summit Gardens is located near Milo, Alberta.

In addition to beekeeping, Miksha also works in Earth Science. In 2007, he made two trips to Lima, Peru, South America, for the Canadian International Development Agency to teach aspects of geophysics and wrote The Mountain Mystery, a history of plate tectonics theory, in 2014.
