= Little Bow Lake Reservoir =

Manmade lake in Alberta, Canada

- Location within Alberta
- Location: Vulcan County, Alberta
- Coordinates: 50°11′40″N 112°40′26″W
- Basin countries: Canada
- Max. length: 3.8 km (2.4 mi)
- Max. width: 3.6 km (2.2 mi)
- Surface area: 5.44 km^{2} (2.10 sq mi)
- Average depth: 4.3 m (14 ft)
- Max. depth: 11 m (36 ft)
- Surface elevation: 853 m (2,799 ft)
- References: Little Bow Lake Reservoir

Little Bow Lake Reservoir is a reservoir in Alberta. It is popular in the area as a swimming hole and fishing spot.

== History ==
The land that is now Little Bow Lake Reservoir used to be a depression in a flat, grassy prairie. The area was used by the Blackfoot tribe as a hunting ground for buffalo. The Canadian government filled the depression with water in 1920 with water from the Little Bow River.
