= Little Bow River =

River in Alberta, Canada

Coordinates: 49°53′17″N 112°28′31″W

The Little Bow River is a tributary of the Oldman River in southern Alberta, Canada. It is about 190 kilometres (120 mi) long. From its headwaters near High River, it flows south, then turns east and flows into Travers Reservoir. Afterwards, it flows southeast into the Oldman River near Picture Butte. The Little Bow is related to the Bow River as they both ultimately feed the South Saskatchewan River.

Water is diverted from the Highwood River and Bow River into the Little Bow as part of the Little Bow Project to facilitate irrigation practices in the surrounding plain.

== See also ==
- Little Bow Provincial Park
- List of rivers of Alberta
