= Herronton =

- Hamlet
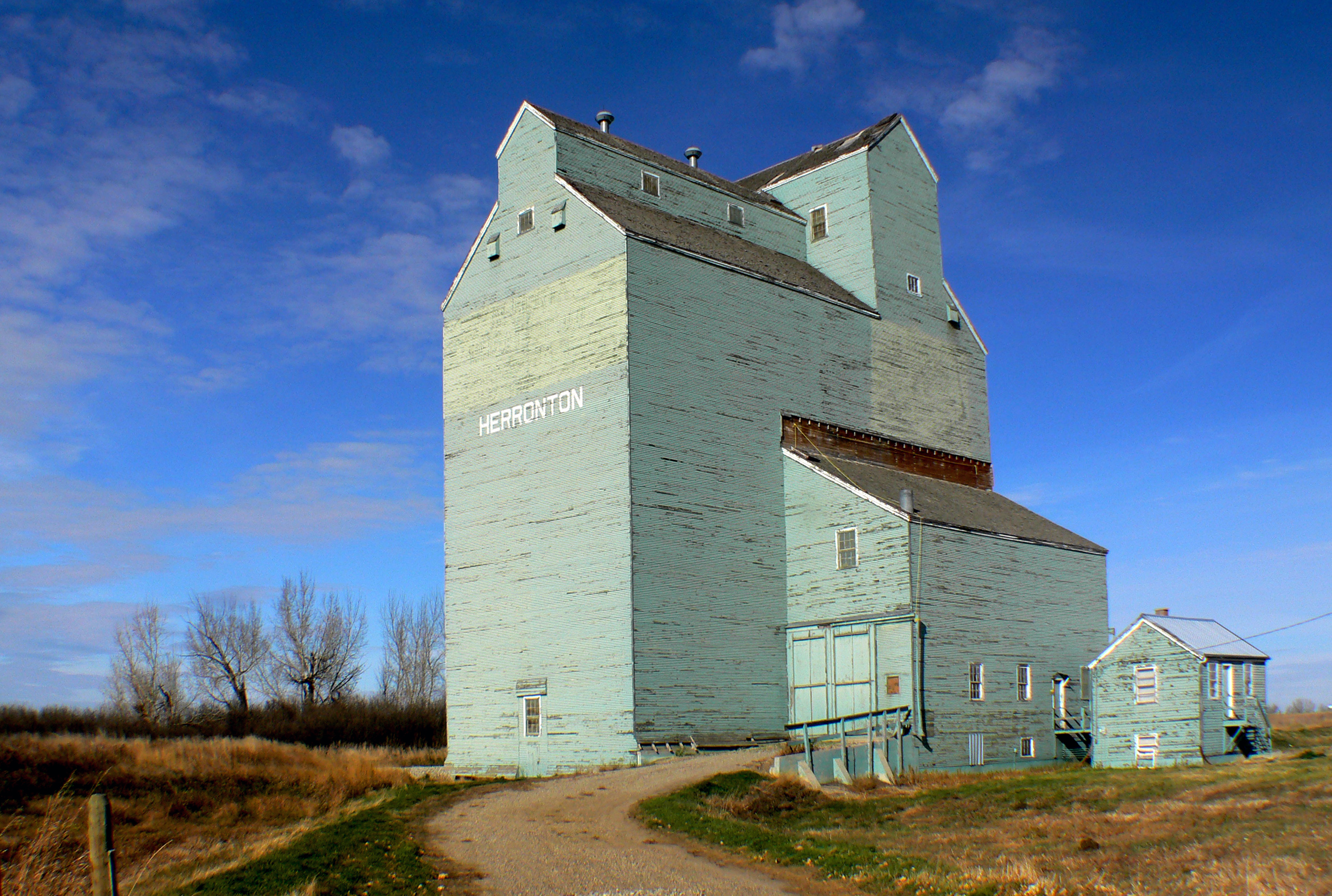
- Grain elevator in Herronton, Alberta

- Location of Herronton Herronton (Canada)
- Coordinates: 50°37′29″N 113°26′22″W
- Country: Canada
- Province: Alberta
- Region: Southern Alberta
- Census division: 5
- Municipal district: Vulcan County

Government
  - Type: Unincorporated
  - Governing body: Vulcan County Council

Population (2007)
  - Total: 10
- Time zone: UTC−06:00 (Alberta Time)
- Area codes: 403, 587, 825

Herronton is a hamlet in southern Alberta, Canada within Vulcan County. It is located 6 kilometres (3.7 mi) north of Highway 23, approximately 64 kilometres (40 mi) southeast of Calgary. The post office was opened in 1912 and named after John Herron of the North-West Mounted Police.

== Demographics ==
The population of Herronton according to the 2007 municipal census conducted by Vulcan County is 10.

== See also ==
- List of communities in Alberta
- List of hamlets in Alberta
