= Calgary Christian School =

School in Alberta, Canada

Coordinates: 51.02707°N 114.15829°W

Calgary Christian School (CCS) is an alternative program in the Palliser School division, delivering faith-based education to more than 750 students from preschool to Grade 12. CCS is located in the southwest corner of Calgary, Alberta, and is a member of the Palliser Regional Division No. 26.

CCS began teaching in 1963 and had its first graduating class from Grade 12 in 1978. The Calgary Society for Christian Education works in partnership with Palliser to deliver educational programming.

== Notable alumni ==
- Chris Reitsma, former MLB player (Cincinnati Reds, Atlanta Braves, Seattle Mariners)
