= Ensign, Alberta =

Ensign
- Hamlet
- Location of Ensign Ensign (Canada)
- Coordinates: 50°28′30″N 113°25′54″W
- Country: Canada
- Province: Alberta
- Region: Southern Alberta
- Census division: 5
- Municipal district: Vulcan County

Government
  - Type: Unincorporated
  - Governing body: Vulcan County Council

Population (2007)
  - Total: 26
- Time zone: UTC−06:00 (Alberta Time)
- Area codes: 403, 587, 825

Ensign is a hamlet in southern Alberta, Canada within Vulcan County. It is located approximately 11 kilometres (6.8 mi) south of Highway 23 and 78 kilometres (48 mi) southeast of Calgary.

The community was named for the Canadian Red Ensign.

== Demographics ==
The population of Ensign according to the 2007 municipal census conducted by Vulcan County is 26.

== See also ==
- List of communities in Alberta
- List of hamlets in Alberta
