= Master's Academy & College =

Masters Academy & College
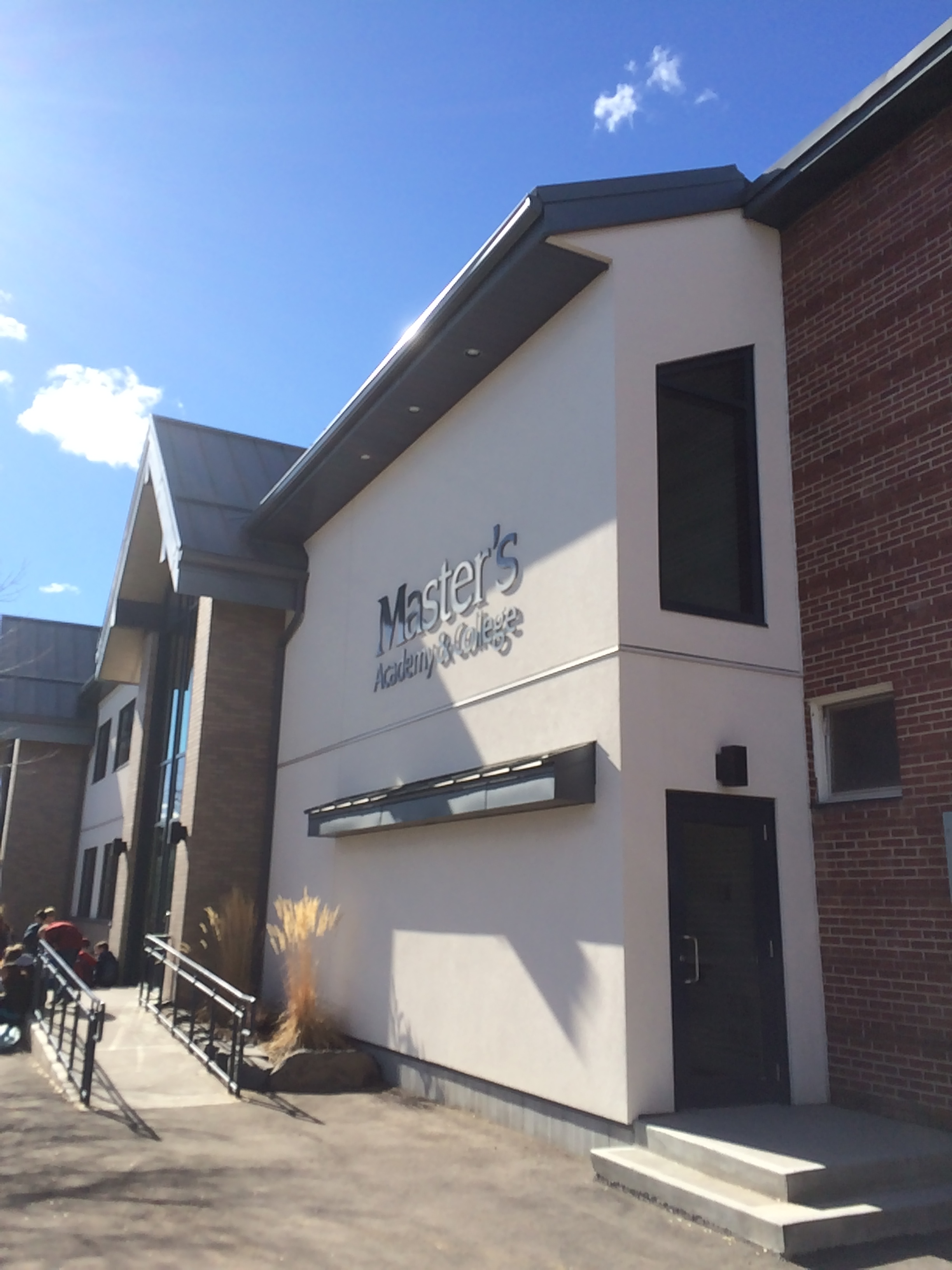
- Front view of Master's newest wing
- 4414 Crowchild Trail Southwest, Calgary, AB; Canada

Information
- Religious affiliation: Christian
- Founded: 1997
- Founder: Tom Rudmik
- School district: Palliser Regional
- Grades: K-12
- Gender: Coed
- Colour
- Athletics: Yes
- Team name: Eagles
- Affiliations: Imaginal Education; Palliser Regional Schools; Becoming Imaginal
- Website: www.masters.ab.ca

Master's Academy & College, founded in 1997, and also known as Master's, Master's Academy, and Master's College, is a K-12 Christian school in Calgary, Alberta, Canada. Master's originally developed its teaching pedagogy through its research arm, the Profound Learning Institute. The Profound Learning Institute was then rebranded as Imaginal Education. Based on this unique model of Profound Learning/Imaginal Learning, Master's joined Palliser Regional School District's Alternative Program in 2008.

== History ==
The school was founded in 1997 by Tom Rudmik. Rudmik is the author of the book Becoming Imaginal and based the school on the theory outlined in the book.

== Academy ==
The academy consists of grades K–6. As of 2019, Master's Academy is the number one ranked elementary school in the province of Alberta by the Fraser Institute.

== College ==
The college consists of grades 7–12.
