= Dalemead =

- Hamlet
- Location of Dalemead in Alberta
- Coordinates: 50°52′29″N 113°38′15″W
- Country: Canada
- Province: Alberta
- Census division: No. 6
- Municipal district: Rocky View County

Area (2021)
  - Land: 0.18 km^{2} (0.069 sq mi)

Population (2021)
  - Total: 25
  - Density: 138.8/km^{2} (359/sq mi)
- Time zone: UTC−06:00 (Alberta Time)

Dalemead is a hamlet in southern Alberta under the jurisdiction of Rocky View County. It is approximately 35 km (21 mi) southeast of Downtown Calgary and 3.2 km (2.0 mi) south of Highway 22X along a Canadian Pacific Kansas City railway line.

== History ==
Established in 1913 with the Canadian Pacific Railway line, Dalemead was originally named Strathmead but after some confusion with the nearby Town of Strathmore, the name was changed to Dalemead. The present name is derived from the nearby dale, and the last name of Dr. Ellwood Mead.

== Demographics ==
In the 2021 Census of Population conducted by Statistics Canada, Dalemead had a population of 25 living in 11 of its 11 total private dwellings, a change of −16.7% from its 2016 population of 30. With a land area of 0.18 km^{2} (0.069 sq mi), it had a population density of 138.9/km^{2} (359.7/sq mi) in 2021.

The population of Dalemead according to the 2018 municipal census conducted by Rocky View County is 29, an increase from its 2013 municipal census population count of 27.

As a designated place in the 2016 Census of Population conducted by Statistics Canada, Dalemead had a population of 30 living in 13 of its 13 total private dwellings, a change of 15.4% from its 2011 population of 26. With a land area of 0.1 km^{2} (0.039 sq mi), it had a population density of 300.0/km^{2} (777.0/sq mi) in 2016.

== See also ==
- List of communities in Alberta
- List of hamlets in Alberta
