= Gosteli =

Gosteli is a surname. Notable people with the surname include:

- Julia Kirchmayr-Gosteli (born 1967), Swiss politician
- Marthe Gosteli (1917–2017), Swiss suffrage activist and archivist
