= Travers Reservoir =

Reservoir in Alberta, Canada

- Location within Alberta
- Location: Vulcan County, Alberta
- Coordinates: 50°13′10″N 112°50′22″W
- Basin countries: Canada
- Max. length: 10.1 km (6.3 mi)
- Max. width: 17 km (11 mi)
- Surface area: 22.5 km^{2} (8.7 sq mi)
- Average depth: 18.3 m (60 ft)
- Max. depth: 66.4 m (218 ft)
- Surface elevation: 856 m (2,808 ft)
- References: Travers Reservoir

Travers Reservoir is a reservoir on the Little Bow River in Alberta, built in 1954. More commonly known as "Little Bow" the lake is diverse and Watersports and Fishing are the common activities, on the lake with many starting out from the Little Bow Provincial Campground on the west end of the lake. On the east end of the lake, the Southern Alberta Bible Camp thrives with Camps happening all summer long and other activities year round. The Little Bow Resort, home to over 150 lake homes, Sits prominently on the west end of the lake. Most property around the lake is privately owned and many Cottages and acreages exist.

During the flooding in southern Alberta in June 2013, operating structures associated with this reservoir were opened by Alberta Environment and Water. Downstream waterflow increased from a normal 3 m^{3}/s to 60 m^{3}/s.
