= Champion, Alberta =

Champion
- Village
- Village of Champion
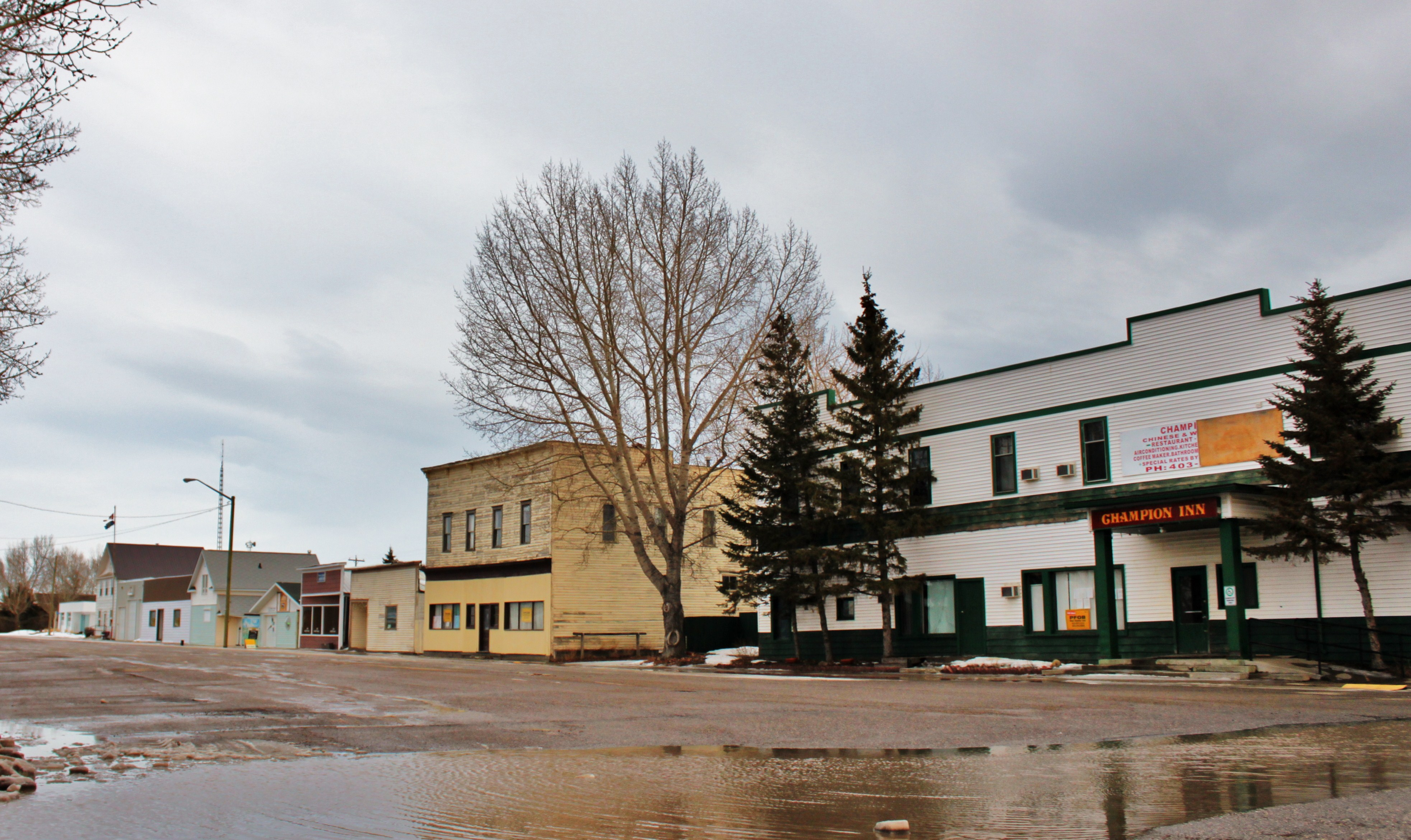
- South side of Main Street Champion 2011

- Location in Alberta Champion (Canada)
- Coordinates: 50°14′23″N 113°08′53″W
- Country: Canada
- Province: Alberta
- Region: Southern Alberta
- Census division: 11
- Municipal district: Vulcan County
- Incorporated
  - Village: May 27, 1911

Government
  - Type: Mayor–council government
  - Mayor: Richard Ellis
  - Governing body: Champion Village Council

Area (2021)
  - Land: 0.88 km^{2} (0.34 sq mi)
- Elevation: 960 m (3,150 ft)

Population (2021)
  - Total: 351
  - Density: 400.7/km^{2} (1,038/sq mi)
- Time zone: UTC−06:00 (Alberta Time)
- Forward sortation area: T0L 0R0
- Area codes: 403, 587, 825
- Highways: Highway 23
- Website: www.villageofchampion.ca

Champion is a village in southern Alberta, Canada within Vulcan County. It is located on Highway 23, approximately 74 kilometres (46 mi) north of Lethbridge and 147 kilometres (91 mi) south of Calgary.

== History ==
Homesteaders began arriving in the Champion area in 1904 and 1905, mainly from the US, Eastern Canada, and Britain. The vast prairie grasslands, cut through by the Little Bow River, provided ideal country for farming and ranching. One of these settlers was Martin G. Clever, who arrived in 1905. He homesteaded on the quarter section of land (160 acres) where the town of Champion is currently located.

The birth of the town was the product of the rapid settlement of the farming and ranching land in the area, and it was also fuelled by the discovery of coal. Homesteader Henry Therriualt opened the first coal mine in the area in 1906, and farmers travelled from neighbouring towns (including Nanton and Stavely) to purchase coal from the Therriault mine. Their journey took them through the Clever homestead to reach the mine, and soon Martin Clever realized the business opportunity that presented itself.

Soon, a country store and a mail route were established. When the storeowner (George Mark) applied to have a government post office located, the settlement required a name, and in honour of Martin Clever, the community was named Cleverville. Several other businesses soon sprung up, thanks to Martin Clever's offer of the free use of his land: Cleverville was soon home to three general stores, a millinery and linen shop, drug store, butcher shop, blacksmith shop, livery stable, restaurant, two real estate offices, lumber yard, Bank of Hamilton, and doctor's office.

In 1910 the Canadian Pacific Railway (CPR) reached the area, although it became apparent that the rails themselves would not run directly past Cleverville. As a result, the townspeople decided to move, using horses and skids and wagons, all of the buildings of the town to a new location closer to the railway. This new settlement required a new name, and so the relocated Cleverville became the new village of Champion. The town was apparently named after H.T. Champion, a banker in the Winnipeg firm Alloway and Champion, well-known bankers and loaners throughout the period of settlement of the west. The Alloway and Champion Bank in Winnipeg, Manitoba built in 1905 is on the Registry of Historical Places of Canada. When the town of Champion was relocated, so the story goes, a Winnipeg C.P.R. man named the town after the prominent banker.

Champion received its charter on May 27, 1911, and the first council meeting was held in June. The growing village required ever more services, and soon Champion was home to its first grain elevator (1912), a telephone office, a school (1913), recreational facilities, and an ever-growing number of retail shops and businesses. A local newspaper, The Champion Chronicle, was also started in 1918 or 1919, and remained in print until 1943.

Agriculture sustained the growth of the Champion area. In 1915 Champion became known as the "Million Bushel Town," as one million bushels of wheat were shipped that year. The Champion Board of Trade was eager to promote the village as a land of opportunity, and in 1913 published the promotional pamphlet meant to entice settlers and entrepreneurs to move to the area. Claiming that "of all the thriving towns and cities in Western Canada, destined to become the industrial centres of the future, none has established its position, or grown to such importance, in so brief a space of time, as Champion," the Board of Trade invited people to take up opportunities in, of course, grain farming, but also in poultry- and stock-raising, railway work, brick- and cement-making, and the development of the natural gas and coal resources in the area.

However, Champion wasn't the only western settlement claiming to be the city of the future, and its population peaked at around 650 people. Nevertheless, Champion continued to mature into a stable and close-knit village. The building of the community hall in the late 1920s was a particularly important moment in the history of the town, and the hall continues to host a variety of community social events.

Along with agriculture, coal mining was an important economic engine for the area. After the initial discovery of coal by Henry Therriault, a number of mines were established. Between 1906 and 1965, when the last coal mine was shut down, there were 58 registered coal mines in the area. In addition to these, there were numerous mines dug into the river or lake beds by families who used coal to heat their homes. Many farmers worked in the mines in the fall and winter months, when farming work was scarce and there was greater demand for coal to heat homes and businesses.

Agriculture remained, however, the most important economic activity for the town and surrounding area. By the mid-1920s there were seven grain elevators in Champion. However, as grain handling procedures, as well as world markets, changed throughout the 20th century, Champion's wooden grain elevators, like so many throughout the prairies, became increasingly obsolete. Champion's last elevator was torn down in 2004.

Champion's population throughout the years has remained small but active. Sports formed an important part of community life, particularly through the heyday of the Champion Men's baseball team throughout the 1950s and 1960s. Social and cultural clubs such as the Lions Club, the Champion branch of the Royal Canadian Legion, 4-H clubs, Scouts and Girl Guides, and the Pioneer Club, provide the social backbone of the village and surrounding area.

Since its founding, the Village of Champion has celebrated its anniversary every five years, traditionally on the July 1st long weekend. In 2011, the town celebrated its 100th anniversary.

== Demographics ==
In the 2021 Census of Population conducted by Statistics Canada, the Village of Champion had a population of 351 living in 164 of its 192 total private dwellings, a change of 10.7% from its 2016 population of 317. With a land area of 0.88 km^{2} (0.34 sq mi), it had a population density of 398.9/km^{2} (1,033.1/sq mi) in 2021.

In the 2016 Census of Population conducted by Statistics Canada, the Village of Champion recorded a population of 317 living in 164 of its 185 total private dwellings, a −16.1% change from its 2011 population of 378. With a land area of 0.89 km^{2} (0.34 sq mi), it had a population density of 356.2/km^{2} (922.5/sq mi) in 2016.

== Government ==
The village is governed by a council consisting of a mayor and four councillors, and is administered by a chief administrative officer.

== Services ==
Champion is home to Champion School, which has a population of approximately 70 students from grades 1 through 9 and hosts a privately run kindergarten in a classroom in the school.

Recreational and cultural services in the village include the Champion Public Library, the Community Pool (outdoors), the Pioneer Club Seniors' Drop-In Centre, two baseball fields, the Champion Community Park and Campground, and in the winter, a skating arena with natural ice.

Retail services and businesses in Champion include a grocery/liquor/lottery store, a bank, a post office, an ice cream shop, and various other locally owned businesses.

In terms of emergency response, the Village of Champion is served by the RCMP detachment and EMS services in neighbouring Vulcan, as well as the Champion Volunteer Fire Department.

The village has several churches, including St. Mary's Catholic Church, the Champion Congregational Church, and a local meetinghouse of the Church of Jesus Christ of Latter-day Saints. Champion serves as a gateway to Little Bow Provincial Park, which is located 15 kilometres (9.3 mi) east of the village and provides camping and many other outdoor recreational activities.

== Notable people ==
- Rosella Bjornson - first female airline pilot in Canada, the first female captain in Canadian aviation
- Jannette Oke - writer of Christian novels

== See also ==
- List of communities in Alberta
- List of villages in Alberta
