= East Arrowwood Creek =

Stream in Alberta, Canada

Coordinates: 50.76681°N 113.11861°W

East Arrowwood Creek is a stream in Alberta, Canada.

East Arrowwood Creek takes its name from the Blackfoot term, nehis-ziks-kway, which means "arrowwood place".

== See also ==
- List of rivers of Alberta
