= Mossleigh =

- Hamlet
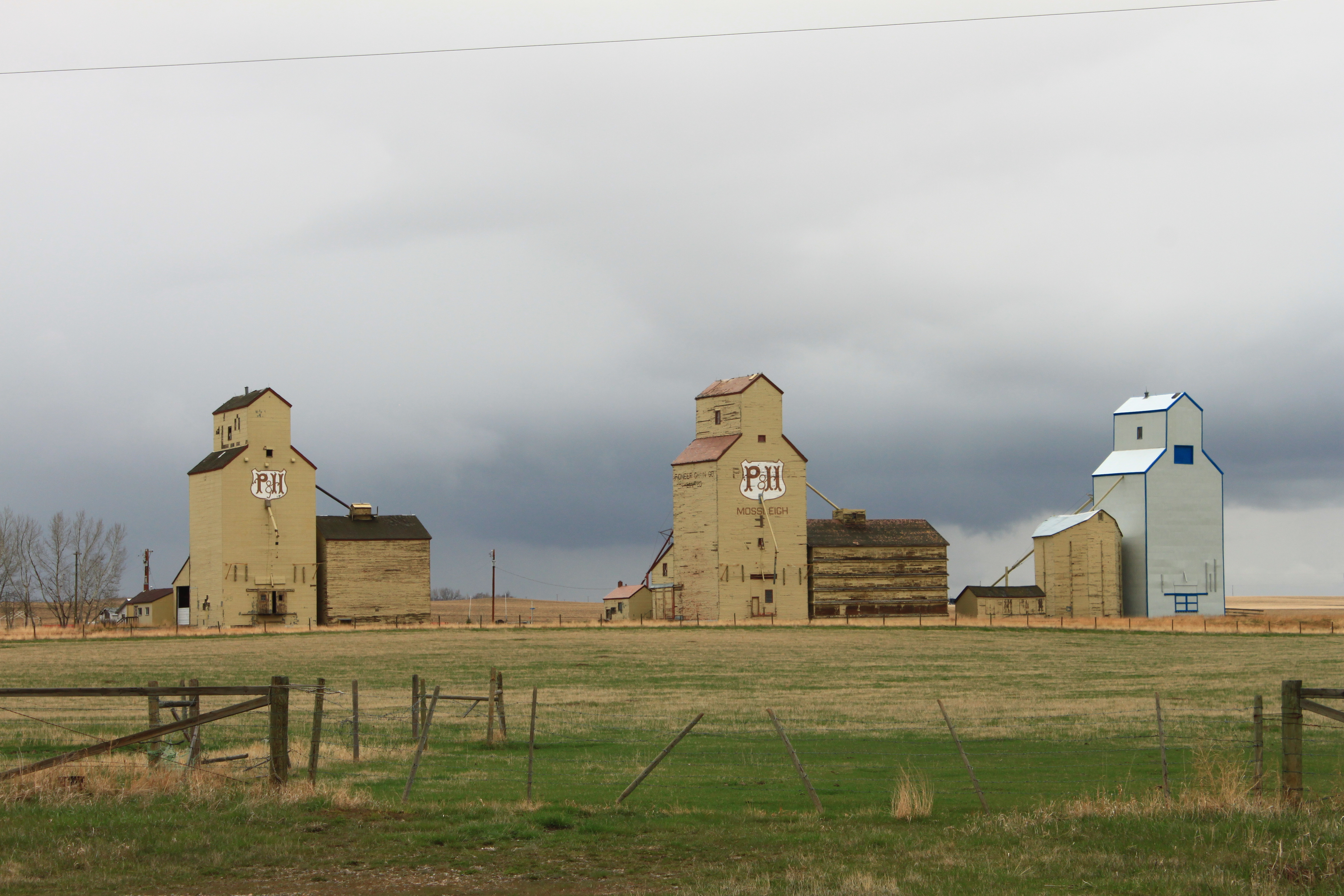
- Mossleigh elevators

- Location of Mossleigh
- Coordinates: 50°43′13″N 113°19′28″W
- Country: Canada
- Province: Alberta
- Region: Southern Alberta
- Census division: 5
- Municipal district: Vulcan County

Government
  - Type: Unincorporated
  - Governing body: Vulcan County Council

Population (2007)
  - Total: 53
- Time zone: UTC−06:00 (Alberta Time)
- Area codes: 403, 587, 825
- Highways: Highway 24
- Railways: Canadian Pacific Kansas City

Mossleigh is a hamlet in southern Alberta, Canada within Vulcan County. It is located on Highway 24, approximately 63 kilometres (39 mi) southeast of Calgary.

== Demographics ==
The population of Mossleigh according to the 2007 municipal census conducted by Vulcan County is 53.

Population history of Mossleigh

Year	Pop.	±%
1941	82	—
1951	71	−13.4%
1956	69	−2.8%
1961	47	−31.9%
1966	60	+27.7%

Year	Pop.	±%
1971	48	−20.0%
1976	55	+14.6%
1981	45	−18.2%
1986	41	−8.9%
1991	47	+14.6%

Source: Statistics Canada

== Services ==
Mossleigh has a community hall, gas station/convenience store, a motel, and a restaurant. The Mossleigh community school built in 1953 was closed in 1988 and is now privately owned. The former two room high school is also privately owned.

== Attractions ==
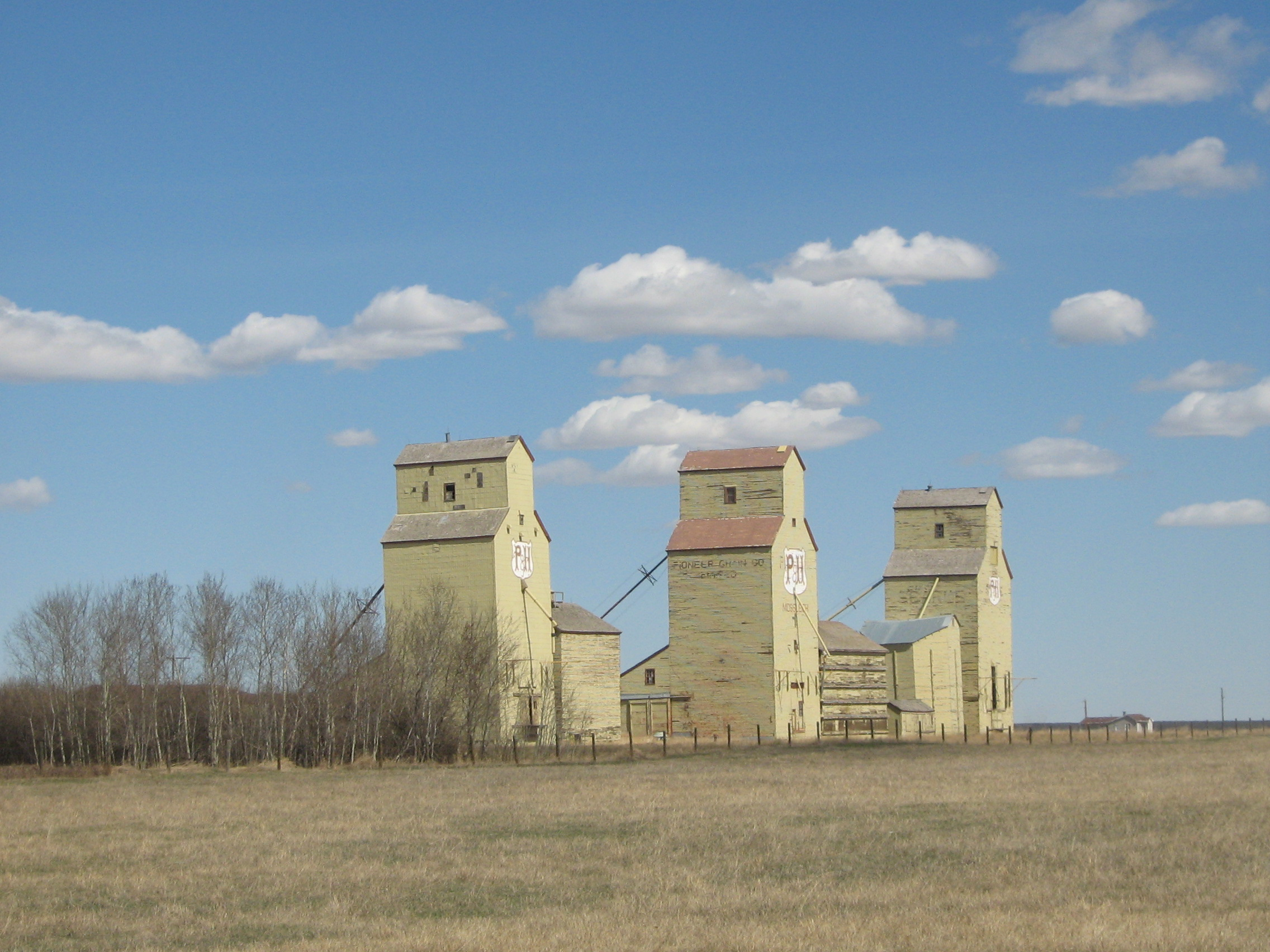
Elevators at Mossleigh

Mossleigh is home to a Lions Club campground, while Aspen Crossing, located one kilometre west of Mossleigh, features a rail dining car with dinner theatre, a rail station with a gift store and a garden centre, and a campground with caboose cabins. Mossleigh is also home to three wooden grain elevators. Two are owned by Cousins Ian and Eric Donovan and the third is currently owned by Parrish & Heimbecker. The town also has an active car club.

The former United Church of Mossleigh was active between 1948 and 2003 when dwindling congregation numbers forced its closure, and amalgamation with the United Church in nearby Arrowwood, Alberta. The church building had been a one-room schoolhouse that operated as the Sunset Valley School S.D. #3236 from 1915 to 1939. Low enrollment caused its closure. The schoolhouse sat empty from 1939 to 1946 when it was purchased by the Mossleigh Blindcreek Ladies Aide, who also purchased two lots in Mossleigh for the building to be relocated to. A cornerstone was laid in a ceremony on May 25, 1947 and was attended by 150 people. The next year was spent moving, remodeling and redecorating the school building so it was fit for church services.

In early 2017, Vulcan County recognized the former United Church building in the town as a municipal historic resource. The church is the only building in Vulcan County to be recognized as a municipal historic resource. This designation allows the owner to apply for provincial grants towards the restoration and upkeep of the building.

== See also ==
- List of communities in Alberta
- List of hamlets in Alberta
