= Gleichen, Alberta =

Gleichen
- Hamlet
- Location of Gleichen Gleichen (Canada)
- Coordinates: 50°51′58″N 113°03′17″W
- Country: Canada
- Province: Alberta
- Region: Southern Alberta
- Census division: 5
- Municipal district: Wheatland County, Alberta

Government
  - Type: Unincorporated
  - Governing body: Wheatland County, Alberta Council

Area (2021)
  - Land: 1.42 km^{2} (0.55 sq mi)

Population (2021)
  - Total: 314
  - Density: 221.3/km^{2} (573/sq mi)
- Time zone: UTC−06:00 (Alberta Time)
- Area codes: 403, 587, 825

Gleichen /ˈɡliːʃən/ is a hamlet in southeast Alberta, Canada within Wheatland County. It is located adjacent to the Siksika Nation at the intersection of Highway 1 and Highway 547, approximately 40 kilometres (25 mi) southeast of Strathmore. It has an elevation of 903 m (2,963 ft).

== History ==
It was named after Lord Edward Gleichen in 1884. Gleichen was originally incorporated as a village on January 24, 1899 and then incorporated as a town on May 6, 1910. After nearly 100 years as a municipality however, Gleichen dissolved to hamlet status under the jurisdiction of Wheatland County on March 31, 1998.

During the formation of the province, Gleichen was large enough to have its own seat in the Legislative Assembly of Alberta (see Gleichen provincial electoral district). Its population peaked at 668 according to the Canada 1921 Census.

Due to its proximity to the railroad, Gleichen was readily accessible to farmers and ranchers living in the area. Its mostly wooden structures however posed an increased risk of widespread fires. After the community burned a second time in 1912, many of its residents moved elsewhere, mostly to Calgary.

== Climate ==
Gleichen experiences a semi-arid climate (Köppen BSk). Winters are long, dry and cold, while summers are short and warm. Precipitation is usually scant, with an annual mean of 336 millimetres (13.2 in).

A temperature of 46.1 °C (115 °F) was once said to have occurred in Gleichen on July 28, 1903. However, according to official meteorological records, the temperature that day had only reached 21.3 °C (70.3 °F). Gleichen has never officially recorded a temperature higher than 37.8 °C (100 °F). Otherwise, Gleichen would have held the record for the highest temperature in Canada until 2021.

Climate data for Gleichen, Alberta
Month	Jan	Feb	Mar	Apr	May	Jun	Jul	Aug	Sep	Oct	Nov	Dec	Year
Record high °C (°F)	16.7 (62.1)	22.0 (71.6)	26.5 (79.7)	31.1 (88.0)	35.0 (95.0)	37.2 (99.0)	37.8 (100.0)	37.8 (100.0)	35.0 (95.0)	31.0 (87.8)	25.0 (77.0)	21.7 (71.1)	37.8 (100.0)
Mean daily maximum °C (°F)	−3.4 (25.9)	−0.1 (31.8)	4.3 (39.7)	12.5 (54.5)	17.8 (64.0)	21.6 (70.9)	24.6 (76.3)	24.7 (76.5)	18.8 (65.8)	12.6 (54.7)	2.4 (36.3)	−2.8 (27.0)	11.1 (52.0)
Daily mean °C (°F)	−9.4 (15.1)	−6.3 (20.7)	−1.9 (28.6)	5.2 (41.4)	10.4 (50.7)	14.5 (58.1)	17.0 (62.6)	16.6 (61.9)	11.1 (52.0)	5.2 (41.4)	−3.3 (26.1)	−8.6 (16.5)	4.2 (39.6)
Mean daily minimum °C (°F)	−15.4 (4.3)	−12.5 (9.5)	−8.1 (17.4)	−2 (28)	3.0 (37.4)	7.3 (45.1)	9.4 (48.9)	8.5 (47.3)	3.4 (38.1)	−2.2 (28.0)	−9.1 (15.6)	−14.3 (6.3)	−2.7 (27.1)
Record low °C (°F)	−46.7 (−52.1)	−47.2 (−53.0)	−38.9 (−38.0)	−26.7 (−16.1)	−11.1 (12.0)	−2.8 (27.0)	0.0 (32.0)	−3.5 (25.7)	−12.8 (9.0)	−28 (−18)	−36.5 (−33.7)	−43.3 (−45.9)	−47.2 (−53.0)
Average precipitation mm (inches)	9.2 (0.36)	7.8 (0.31)	16.4 (0.65)	20.0 (0.79)	45.3 (1.78)	64.1 (2.52)	57.1 (2.25)	44.5 (1.75)	43.2 (1.70)	11.2 (0.44)	9.9 (0.39)	8.8 (0.35)	337.6 (13.29)
Average rainfall mm (inches)	0.0 (0.0)	0.0 (0.0)	1.8 (0.07)	13.5 (0.53)	40.1 (1.58)	64.1 (2.52)	57.1 (2.25)	44.5 (1.75)	42.2 (1.66)	6.8 (0.27)	1.8 (0.07)	0.3 (0.01)	273.3 (10.76)
Average snowfall cm (inches)	9.0 (3.5)	8.0 (3.1)	15.0 (5.9)	7.0 (2.8)	5.0 (2.0)	0.0 (0.0)	0.0 (0.0)	0.0 (0.0)	1.0 (0.4)	4.0 (1.6)	8.0 (3.1)	9.0 (3.5)	65.0 (25.6)
Source: Environment Canada

== Demographics ==
In the 2021 Census of Population conducted by Statistics Canada, Gleichen had a population of 314 living in 139 of its 168 total private dwellings, a change of −3.1% from its 2016 population of 324. With a land area of 1.42 km^{2} (0.55 sq mi), it had a population density of 221.1/km^{2} (572.7/sq mi) in 2021.

As a designated place in the 2016 Census of Population conducted by Statistics Canada, Gleichen had a population of 324 living in 137 of its 172 total private dwellings, a change of −3.6% from its 2011 population of 336. With a land area of 1.45 km^{2} (0.56 sq mi), it had a population density of 223.4/km^{2} (578.7/sq mi) in 2016.

== See also ==
- List of communities in Alberta
- List of designated places in Alberta
- List of former urban municipalities in Alberta
- List of hamlets in Alberta
