= Carseland =

- Hamlet
- Location of Carseland Carseland (Canada)
- Coordinates: 50.852°N 113.470°W
- Country: Canada
- Province: Alberta
- Region: Southern Alberta
- Census division: 5
- Municipal district: Wheatland County, Alberta

Government
  - Type: Unincorporated
  - Governing body: Wheatland County, Alberta Council

Area (2021)
  - Land: 0.56 km^{2} (0.22 sq mi)

Population (2021)
  - Total: 542
  - Density: 963.2/km^{2} (2,495/sq mi)
- Time zone: UTC−06:00 (Alberta Time)
- Area codes: 403, 587, 825

Carseland is a hamlet in Alberta, Canada within Wheatland County. It is located on Highway 24, approximately 23 km (14 mi) south of Cheadle and 26 km (16 mi) south of Strathmore.

It is within Census Division No. 5.

== History ==
The advent of the cattlemen in the late 1800s to the Bow River country west of the Blackfoot Indian Reserve brought men like: Major General Thomas Bland Strange (1881), Charlie Hawks, Colonel Arthur Goldfinch, Felix McHugh (1886) and Colonel Arthur Wyndham (1887) to the Carseland area.

When the Military Colonization Company, which Strange had founded ceased to exist, the Canadian Pacific Railway (CPR) permitted free grazing on their 3,000,000 acres (12,000 km^{2}) on the north side of the Bow and it attracted many new settlers to the area.

The Addemans, Moffats and McGregors purchased the Horsetrack from the Goldfinchs and started the Horsetrack Cattle Company in 1901. Others such as Groves, Moorhouse, Brown, McHughes, McKinnon and Newbolts soon followed.

When the open range came to an end most of the areas cattlemen became the first grain farmers of the district.

In 1903, the CPR brought irrigation to its large land acquisitions in the Carseland area.

As the land prospered and more product was being shipped by rail to market, the CPR began construction of the Gleichen/Shepard cut-off in 1913. These rails carried troops to the First World War in 1914.

Due to its proximity to the river crossing and railway, Carseland grew rapidly into a prosperous community during the 1920s through 1940s. It boasted six grain elevators, a railway station, school, general store, barber shop and pool-room, post office, restaurant, garage and Ford car dealer, well house, lumber yard, hardware store, meat market, bank, stock yards, two churches, hotel and community centre. Only three original buildings still standing on Railway Avenue are the hotel, the post office was formerly the Carseland Meat Market owned by the Bonitz family (and is now in the one strip mall) and the former hardware store - all of which were built in 1916.

== Demographics ==
Population history of Carseland
Year	Pop.	±%
1941	106	—
1951	114	+7.5%
1956	133	+16.7%
1961	117	−12.0%
1966	85	−27.4%
1971	105	+23.5%
1976	117	+11.4%
1981	484	+313.7%
1986	480	−0.8%
1991	578	+20.4%
1991A	584	+1.0%
1996	652	+11.6%
2001	662	+1.5%
2006	588	−11.2%
2011	568	−3.4%
2016	525	−7.6%
2021	542	+3.2%
Source: Statistics Canada

In the 2021 Census of Population conducted by Statistics Canada, Carseland had a population of 542 living in 218 of its 224 total private dwellings, a change of 3.2% from its 2016 population of 525. With a land area of 0.56 km^{2} (0.22 sq mi), it had a population density of 967.9/km^{2} (2,506.7/sq mi) in 2021.

As a designated place in the 2016 Census of Population conducted by Statistics Canada, Carseland had a population of 525 living in 215 of its 228 total private dwellings, a change of −7.6% from its 2011 population of 568. With a land area of 0.57 km^{2} (0.22 sq mi), it had a population density of 921.1/km^{2} (2,385.5/sq mi) in 2016.

== Economy ==
Carseland's main employers include Nutrien, Orica, Cargill and Stella-Jones.

== See also ==
- List of communities in Alberta
- List of designated places in Alberta
- List of hamlets in Alberta
