= Milo, Alberta =

Milo
- Village
- Village of Milo
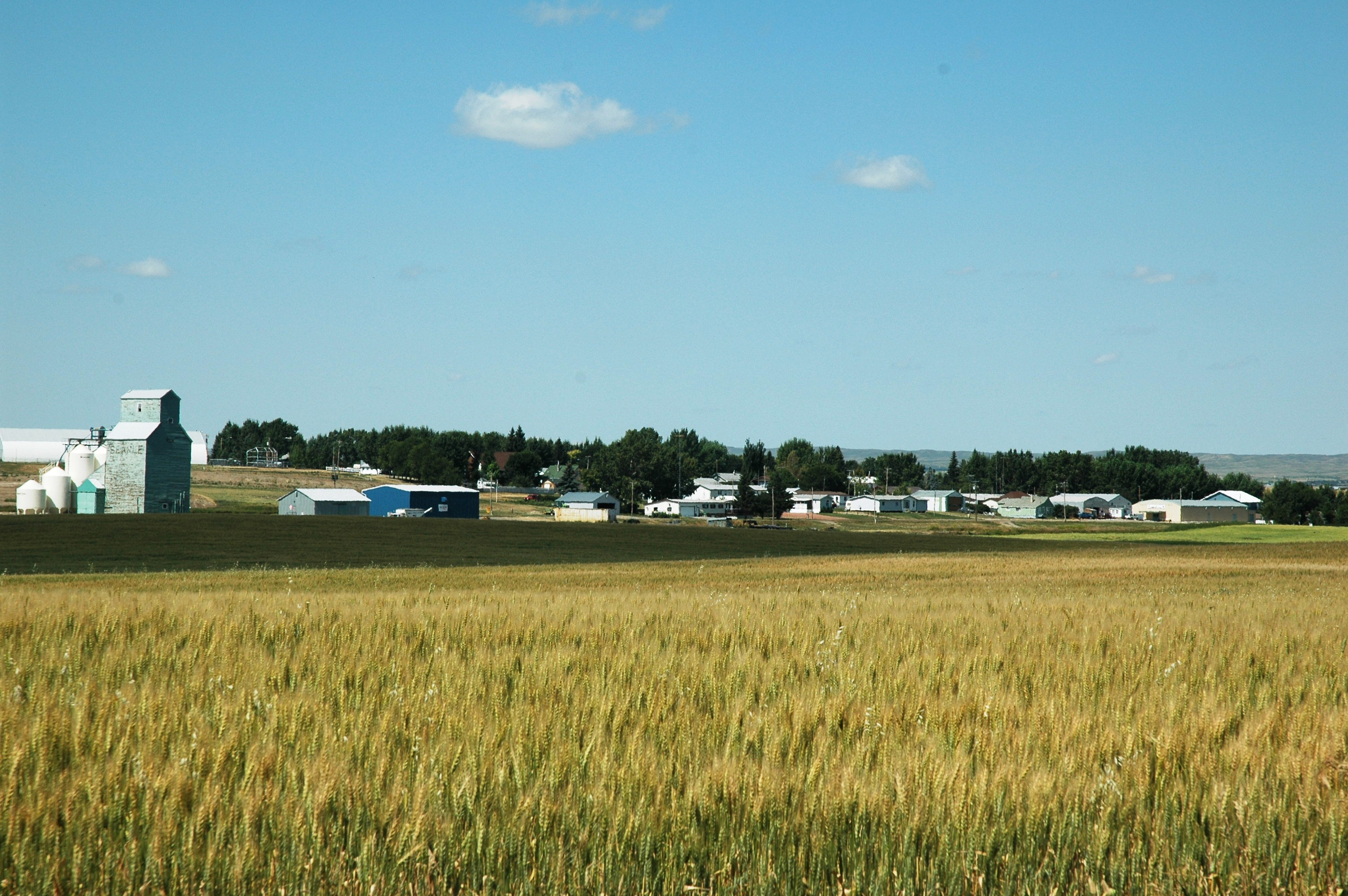
- Milo seen from the east
- Motto: Making Memories in Milo
- Location within Alberta
- Coordinates: 50°34′20″N 112°52′58″W
- Country: Canada
- Province: Alberta
- Region: Southern Alberta
- Census division: 5
- Municipal district: Vulcan County
- Founded: 1909
- Incorporated
  - Village: May 7, 1931

Government
  - Mayor: Nadine Bertschy
  - Governing body: Milo Village Council

Area (2021)
  - Land: 0.96 km^{2} (0.37 sq mi)
- Elevation: 880 m (2,890 ft)

Population (2021)
  - Total: 111
- Time zone: UTC−06:00 (Alberta Time)
- Postal code span: T0L 1L0
- Area code: 403
- Highways: Highway 542; Highway 842
- Waterway: McGregor Lake
- Website: Official website

Milo is a village in Vulcan County, Alberta, Canada. It is located on Highway 542, approximately 127 kilometres (79 mi) southeast of the City of Calgary and 72 kilometres (45 mi) east of the Town of High River. Milo primarily serves as an agricultural service community, supporting the surrounding farming and ranching regions. The village is also known for hosting the annual LieLow Music Festival, a popular event that draws visitors from across the region. This music festival features a diverse lineup of local and regional bands, celebrating a variety of musical genres and contributing to the village's cultural scene. The event has become a significant part of the local community, offering entertainment and a gathering space for both residents and visitors.

== Demographics ==
In the 2021 Census of Population conducted by Statistics Canada, the Village of Milo had a population of 111 living in 51 of its 58 total private dwellings, a change of 22% from its 2016 population of 91. With a land area of 0.96 km^{2} (0.37 sq mi), it had a population density of 115.6/km^{2} (299.5/sq mi) in 2021.

In the 2016 Census of Population conducted by Statistics Canada, the Village of Milo recorded a population of 91 living in 49 of its 64 total private dwellings, a −25.4% change from its 2011 population of 122. With a land area of 0.98 km^{2} (0.38 sq mi), it had a population density of 92.9/km^{2} (240.5/sq mi) in 2016.

== Amenities ==
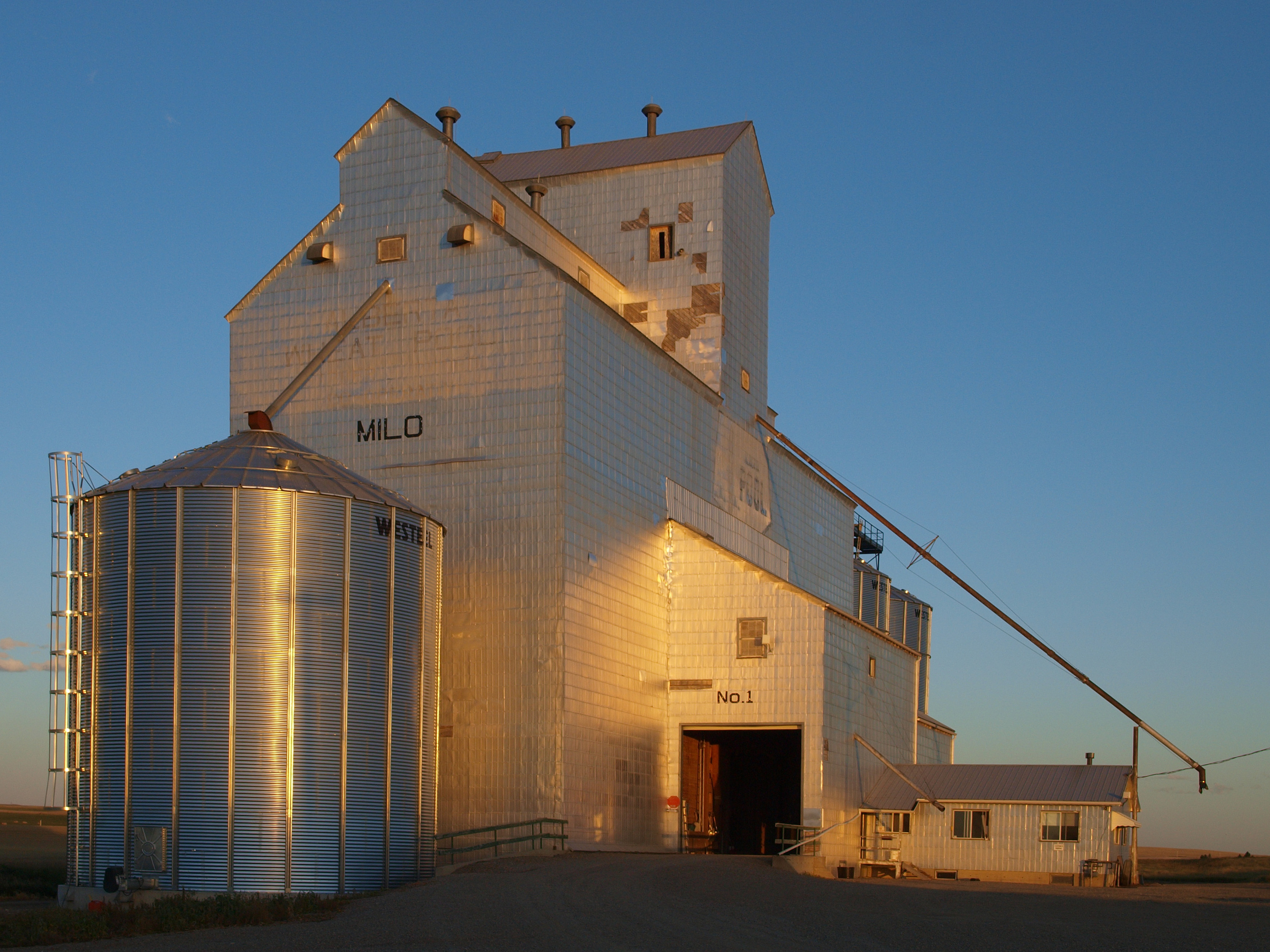
Grain elevator built by Alberta Wheat Pool in Milo.

Amenities include a community hall, curling rink, walking paths, hotel, library, skating area, and school. The village has a grocery store, pub, and café. Each June, Milo hosts LieLow Music Festival, an annual music and arts event established in 2022. The festival features a diverse lineup of local and regional artists, with live performances, workshops, and family-friendly activities. Held in the village’s scenic prairie setting, LieLow has become a notable cultural event in the region, drawing visitors from across Alberta. The community has an active Lions Club which maintains an attractive playground and picnic area. Other services are available in nearby Vulcan (50 km). A campground with 85 sites is located in a small park beside nearby McGregor Lake reservoir. The lake, which is a major part of an irrigation system, is popular for fishing, swimming, windsurfing, boating and birdwatching.

== History ==
In 1909, Milo was settled 3 kilometres northeast of its present location when Jens (Jim) and Alete Aasgard moved here from Osseo, WI and built their store and home. The town was named for Milo Munro, first postmaster - his post office was in the Aasgards' store. Nearby, a blacksmith shop and Bank of Hamilton opened. Before 1920, the Village of Milo had a telephone office, butcher, pool hall, community hall, and ice cream parlor.

A new railroad extension into the area did not reach the young community, so in 1924, Milo was moved to the side of the train tracks. Most of the buildings were pulled to the new location. The town hall was too large and was dismantled in sections and rebuilt at its new location. Village status was achieved in 1931.

A World War II Royal Canadian Air Force navigator, Harlo "Terry" Taerum, the son of a Norwegian immigrant, spent his early years on a farm a few kilometers from Milo and attended school in the community. In May 1943, in Operation Chastise, commonly known as the "Dambuster Raid," he navigated the lead Lancaster bomber at very low level, at night, to the primary target, a power dam inside Germany. He was killed on a later raid in September 1943.

A new community hall was built in 1985 and the curling rink expanded and renovated in 1998. Since 2000, developments along the shores of McGregor Lake have attracted cottagers and vacationers from Calgary. The original site of the village - the Aasgards' farmstead and store - are now part of Canada's largest comb honey beekeeping farm, owned by Don and Ron Miksha.

== See also ==
- List of communities in Alberta
- List of villages in Alberta
