= Arrowwood, Alberta =

Arrowwood
- Village
- Village of Arrowwood
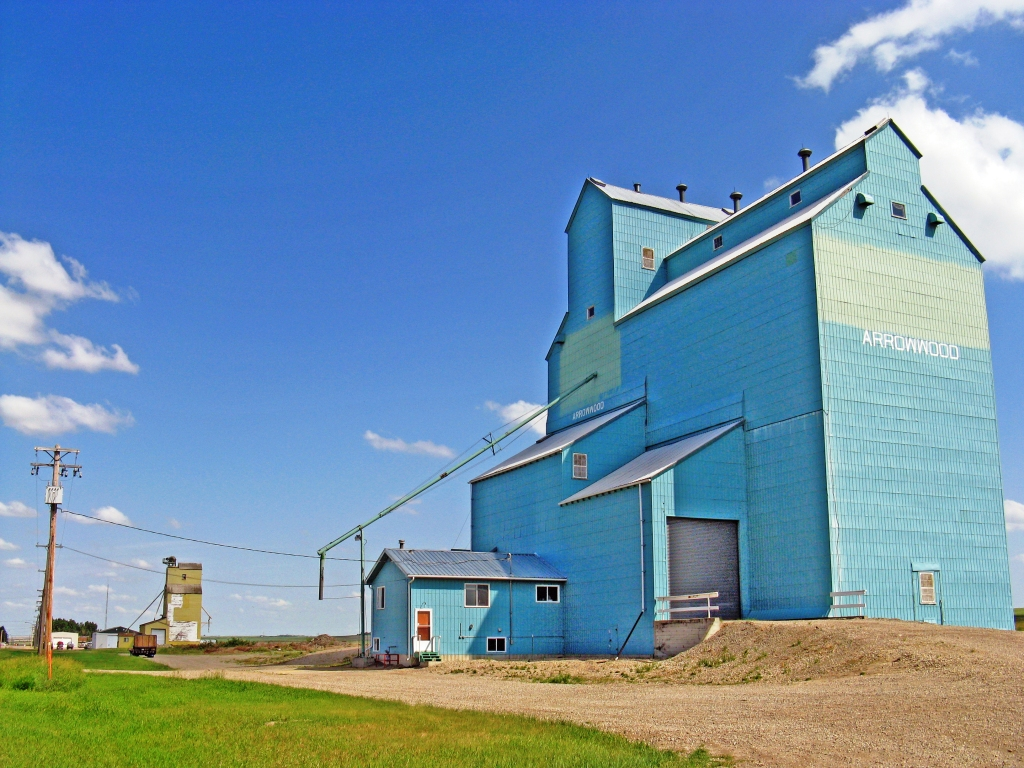
- Last of four elevators along the former CPR track bed on the west side of town.

- Location of Arrowwood in Alberta
- Coordinates: 50°44′10.5″N 113°8′38.7″W
- Country: Canada
- Province: Alberta
- Region: Southern Alberta
- Census division: 5
- Municipal district: Vulcan County
- Incorporated
  - Village: May 13, 1926

Government
  - Mayor: Colin Bexte
  - Governing body: Arrowwood Village Council

Area (2021)
  - Land: 0.75 km^{2} (0.29 sq mi)
- Elevation: 930 m (3,050 ft)

Population (2021)
  - Total: 188
  - Density: 250.8/km^{2} (650/sq mi)
- Time zone: UTC−06:00 (Alberta Time)
- Highways: Highway 547
- Website: Official website

Arrowwood is a village in Vulcan County, Alberta, Canada. It is located on Highway 547, approximately 60 kilometres (37 mi) east of Okotoks.

The community takes its name from nearby East Arrowwood Creek.

== Demographics ==
In the 2021 Canadian census, the village of Arrowwood had a population of 188 living in 74 of its 78 total private dwellings, a change of −9.2% from its 2016 population of 207. With a land area of 0.75 km^{2} (0.29 sq mi), it had a population density of 250.7/km^{2} (649.2/sq mi) in 2021.

In the 2016 census, there were 207 people living in 72 of its 79 total private dwellings, a 10.1% change from its 2011 population of 188. With a land area of 0.75 km^{2} (0.29 sq mi), it had a population density of 276.0/km^{2} (714.8/sq mi) in 2016.

== Government ==
The village is governed by a village council consisting of a mayor and two councillors, and is administrated by a village administrator. Municipal elections are held every four years.

== Notable people ==
- Joyce Meadows, the actress, was born in Arrowwood but left the village in her early childhood.

== See also ==
- List of communities in Alberta
- List of villages in Alberta

== Bibliography ==
- Arrowwood Story (Mistsa-Katpiskoo): In the Shadow of the Buffalo Hills. 1964. Archived from the original on 2017-03-03.
