= Vulcan County =

Municipal district in Alberta, Canada

- Municipal district
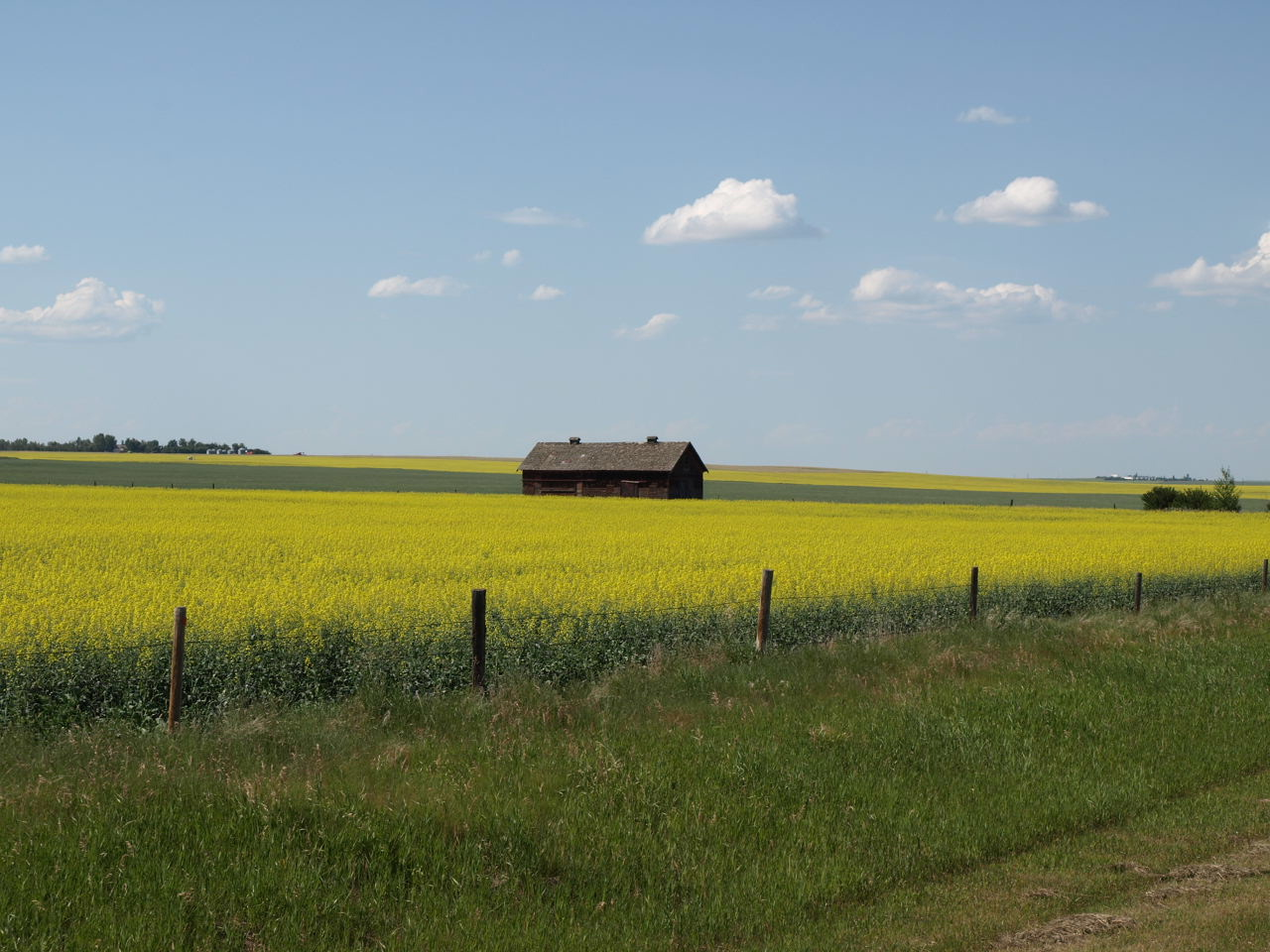

- Location within Alberta
- Country: Canada
- Province: Alberta
- Region: Southern Alberta
- Census division: 5
- Established: 1951
- Incorporated: 1951

Government
  - Reeve: Jason Schneider
  - Governing body: Vulcan County Council
  - Administrative office: Vulcan

Area (2021)
  - Land: 5,356.65 km^{2} (2,068.21 sq mi)

Population (2021)
  - Total: 4,262
- Time zone: UTC−06:00 (Alberta Time)
- Website: vulcancounty.ab.ca

Vulcan County is a municipal district in Alberta, Canada. Located in Census Division No. 5, its municipal office is located in the Town of Vulcan.

== History ==
Vulcan County was originally established in 1951.

== Geography ==
=== Communities and localities ===
The following urban municipalities are surrounded by Vulcan County.

Cities

- none

Towns

- Vulcan

Villages

- Arrowwood
- Carmangay
- Champion
- Lomond
- Milo

Summer villages

- none

The following hamlets are located within Vulcan County.

Hamlets

- Brant
- Ensign
- Herronton
- Kirkcaldy
- Mossleigh
- Queenstown
- Shouldice
- Travers

The following localities are located within Vulcan County.

Localities

- Anastasia
- Armada
- Eyremore
- Farrow

- Majorville
- Pageant
- Peacock

== Demographics ==
In the 2021 Census of Population conducted by Statistics Canada, Vulcan County had a population of 4,262 living in 1,206 of its 1,640 total private dwellings, a change of 7% from its 2016 population of 3,984. With a land area of 5,356.65 km^{2} (2,068.21 sq mi), it had a population density of 0.8/km^{2} (2.1/sq mi) in 2021.

In the 2016 Census of Population conducted by Statistics Canada, Vulcan County had a population of 3,984 living in 1,180 of its 1,616 total private dwellings, a 2.8% change from its 2011 population of 3,875. With a land area of 5,433.43 km^{2} (2,097.86 sq mi), it had a population density of 0.7/km^{2} (1.9/sq mi) in 2016.

Vulcan County's 2012 municipal census counted a population of 3,893, a 0.5% increase over its 2007 municipal census population of 3,830.

== See also ==
- List of communities in Alberta
- List of municipal districts in Alberta
- Little Bow Lake Reservoir
