= Alberta Highway 3 =

Highway in Alberta, Canada

Highway 3
- Crowsnest Highway
- Highway 3 highlighted in red

Route information
- Maintained by the Ministry of Transportation and Economic Corridors
- Length: 324.11 km (201.39 mi)
- Existed: October 8, 1917–present

Major junctions
- West end: Highway 3 at B.C. border in Crowsnest Pass
- Highway 22 near Lundbreck; Highway 6 near Pincher Creek; Highway 2 near Fort Macleod; Highway 23 near Monarch; Highway 25 in Lethbridge; Highway 5 in Lethbridge; Highway 4 in Lethbridge; Highway 36 in Taber
- East end: Highway 1 / Highway 41A in Medicine Hat

Location
- Country: Canada
- Province: Alberta
- Specialized and rural municipalities: Crowsnest Pass; Pincher Creek; Willow Creek; Lethbridge; Taber; Forty Mile; Cypress
- Major cities: Lethbridge; Medicine Hat
- Towns: Fort Macleod; Coalhurst; Coaldale; Taber; Bow Island
- Villages: Cowley; Barnwell

Highway system
- Alberta Numbered Highway Network; List; Former
← Highway 2A	→ Highway 3A

Highway 3 (officially named the Crowsnest Highway) is a 324-kilometre (201 mi) highway that traverses southern Alberta, Canada, running from the Crowsnest Pass through Lethbridge to the Trans-Canada Highway in Medicine Hat. Together with British Columbia Highway 3 which begins in Hope, British Columbia, it forms an interprovincial route that serves as an alternate to the Trans-Canada from the Lower Mainland to the Canadian Prairies.

Highway 3 begins as a two-lane continuation of BC Highway 3 in the Canadian Rockies at Crowsnest Pass, winding through the foothills to a junction with Highway 2 west of Fort Macleod. Briefly concurrent with Highway 2, it becomes a divided highway and part of Alberta's "Export Highway", a segment of the CANAMEX Corridor that stretches from Alaska to Mexico. In Lethbridge, it is an expressway named Crowsnest Trail that crosses the Oldman River and meets the northern termini of Highways 4 and 5; the former is a major route that assumes the designation of the Export Highway, connecting to Interstate 15 in Montana, while the latter branches southwest to Magrath and Cardston. East of Lethbridge, it bisects Coaldale and Taber before reverting to a two-lane highway that ends at Highway 1 in Medicine Hat.

For its entire length, Highway 3 follows the alignment of the Canadian Pacific Railway. It was first a rough dirt road known as the Red Trail plotted in the early 1900s. Later numbered as Highway No. 3, it was designated as a southern branch of the former Trans-Canada Highway by the 1920s and improved to gravel then eventually paved, widened with shoulders, and upgraded to an expressway in sections. The Trans-Canada was officially routed through Calgary in the 1960s, but Highway 3 remained an important alternate route to the west coast and was incorporated into the National Highway System in 1988. Twinning of the first segment between Lethbridge and Coaldale had been completed by the mid-1960s, and it was officially named the Crowsnest Highway in the late 1970s. A major expressway realignment along Crowsnest Trail in central Lethbridge was completed in the 1980s, and twinning of the Fort Macleod–Lethbridge segment was completed in the mid-1990s.

The Ministry of Transportation and Economic Corridors has long-term plans to upgrade the entire route to a freeway by twinning its undivided sections and removing intersections. Unfunded plans have been drafted for a northern Lethbridge bypass, realigning Highways 3 and 4 to the north and east of the city respectively, while a Fort Macleod bypass will realign Highway 3 to the south connecting to a newly extended Highway 2. A $150 million project to twin a 46-kilometre (29 mi) section from Taber to Burdett will be completed in summer 2026, with additional twinning near Medicine Hat in late planning stages.

== Route description ==
Highway 3 was designated as one of the original core routes of the National Highway System in 1988, an interprovincial route connecting large population centres. Most of the road is an undivided, two-lane highway, with a speed limit of 100 km/h (62 mph) outside of rural areas. From Fort Macleod to West Lethbridge and from Coaldale to Taber, it is a divided highway with a speed limit of 110 km/h (68 mph). Highway 3 is a divided expressway between Fort Macleod and Lethbridge that forms a portion of Alberta's Export Highway, a segment of the CANAMEX Corridor that facilitates the movement of goods between Alaska and Mexico. The Fort Macleod–Lethbridge segment also comprises the westernmost portion of the Red Coat Trail, a historic route advertised as that which was travelled by the North-West Mounted Police in the late 19th century in their quest to bring order and peace to the region.

=== Crowsnest Pass and foothills ===
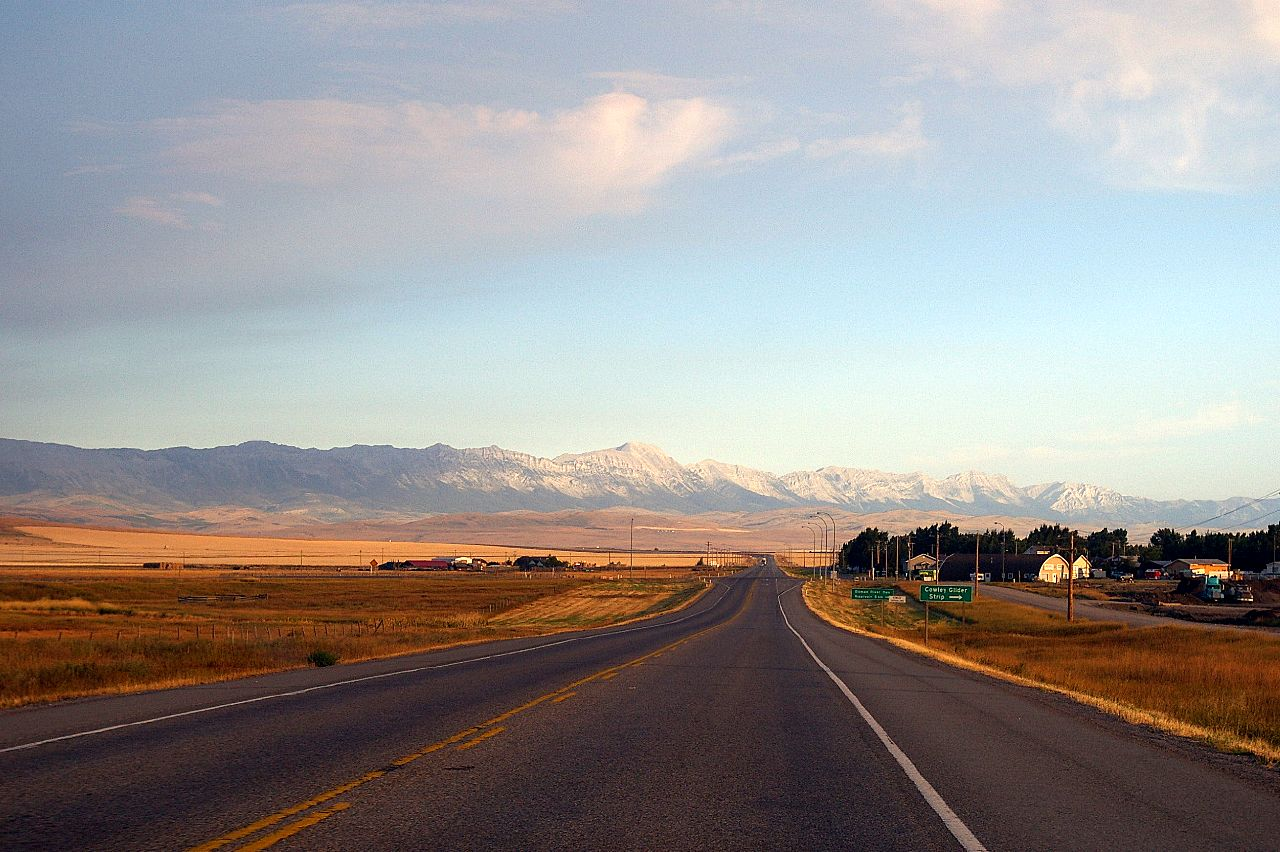
The Crowsnest Highway near Cowley

British Columbia Highway 3 is a two-lane, undivided highway that becomes Alberta Highway 3 at the border in mountainous terrain, paralleling a branch of the Canadian Pacific Railway. It first crosses over to the south side of the railway and passes through the centre of Island Lake on a causeway, part of which is natural terrain. It curves through communities of the Municipality of Crowsnest Pass on the south side of Crowsnest Lake, crossing the Crowsnest River and reaching Highway 40 at Coleman. It continues alongside the railway through Blairmore, again crossing the Crowsnest River and bisecting the community of Frank and the rubble of the Frank Slide, a landslide in which approximately 110 million tonnes of limestone broke away from Turtle Mountain and killed more than 70 people in 1903. The highway, the Crowsnest River, and the railway meander east into the Municipal District of Pincher Creek No. 9 and Burmis from which Highway 507 splits south to Beaver Mines and forms an alternate route from the west into Pincher Creek. Highway 3 curves northeast to the hamlet of Lundbreck which it bypasses, and from which Highway 22 begins and runs north. The first of four former alignments of Highway 3 (all of which are now designated as Highway 3A) passes through Lundbreck, splitting from Highway 3 prior to the hamlet and rejoining it after three kilometres (1.9 mi).

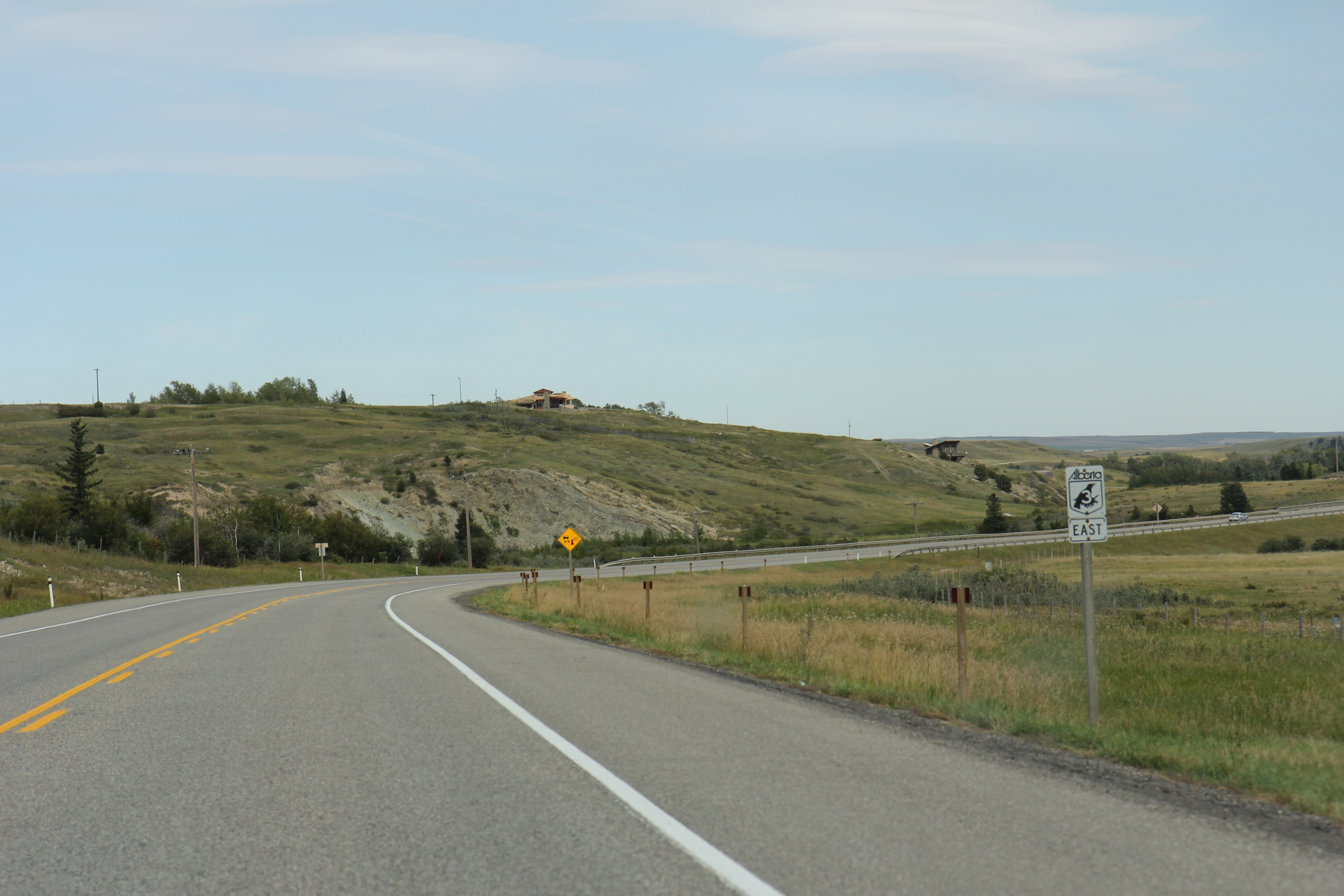
Looking east on Highway 3 near Lundbreck

East of Lundbreck and Cowley, the highway crosses Castle River to Highways 6 and 785 north of Pincher Creek. It briefly parallels the creek for which the town was named before crossing it and reaching Brocket, and Highway 786 which meets Highway 507 southeast of Pincher Creek. Highway 3 follows the Oldman River to Fort Macleod, approximately 30 km (19 mi) east of Brocket. Just prior to Fort Macleod, the highway enters the Municipal District of Willow Creek No. 26 and Highway 810 splits south to the communities of Ardenville and Glenwood after which Highway 3 widens to a divided highway. It meets Highway 2 at a trumpet interchange, and diverges into a one-way road pair through Fort Macleod at a reduced speed limit of 50 km/h (31 mph), concurrent with Highway 2. Highway 811 turns north from Highway 3 in central Fort Macleod to cross the Oldman River on a historic alignment of Highway 2. At the Fort Macleod Health Centre, Highways 2 and 3 curve southeast to leave the town as the one-way roads rejoin into a divided highway. The concurrency ends as Highway 2 splits south as a two-lane highway to Cardston and the United States border at Carway. Highway 3 bends back to the northeast, now designated as the Red Coat Trail and carrying CANAMEX traffic destined for the primary border crossing on Highway 4 at Coutts.

The divided highway continues northeast from Fort Macleod with a speed limit of 110 km/h (68 mph), paralleling the Oldman River. It curves east to bypass Monarch to the south and crosses the river, entering Lethbridge County. Highway 3 formerly passed through Monarch until the 1990s construction of the bypass; that route is now designated as Highway 3A and meets Highway 23 east of the town which then joins Highway 3 north of the confluence of the Oldman and Belly Rivers. After curving southeast, Highway 509 splits southwest to Stand Off. Highway 3 intersects 51 Avenue, the main access for the town of Coalhurst. Westview Drive splits into West Lethbridge at a partial interchange and for less than one kilometre it forms the third route designated as Highway 3A. Highway 3 continues east, entering the city of Lethbridge as a freeway and meeting Highway 25/University Drive at a partial cloverleaf interchange. Highway 25 runs north to Picture Butte, while University Drive connects to the University of Lethbridge and is the main thoroughfare of West Lethbridge.

=== Lethbridge and southeastern Alberta ===
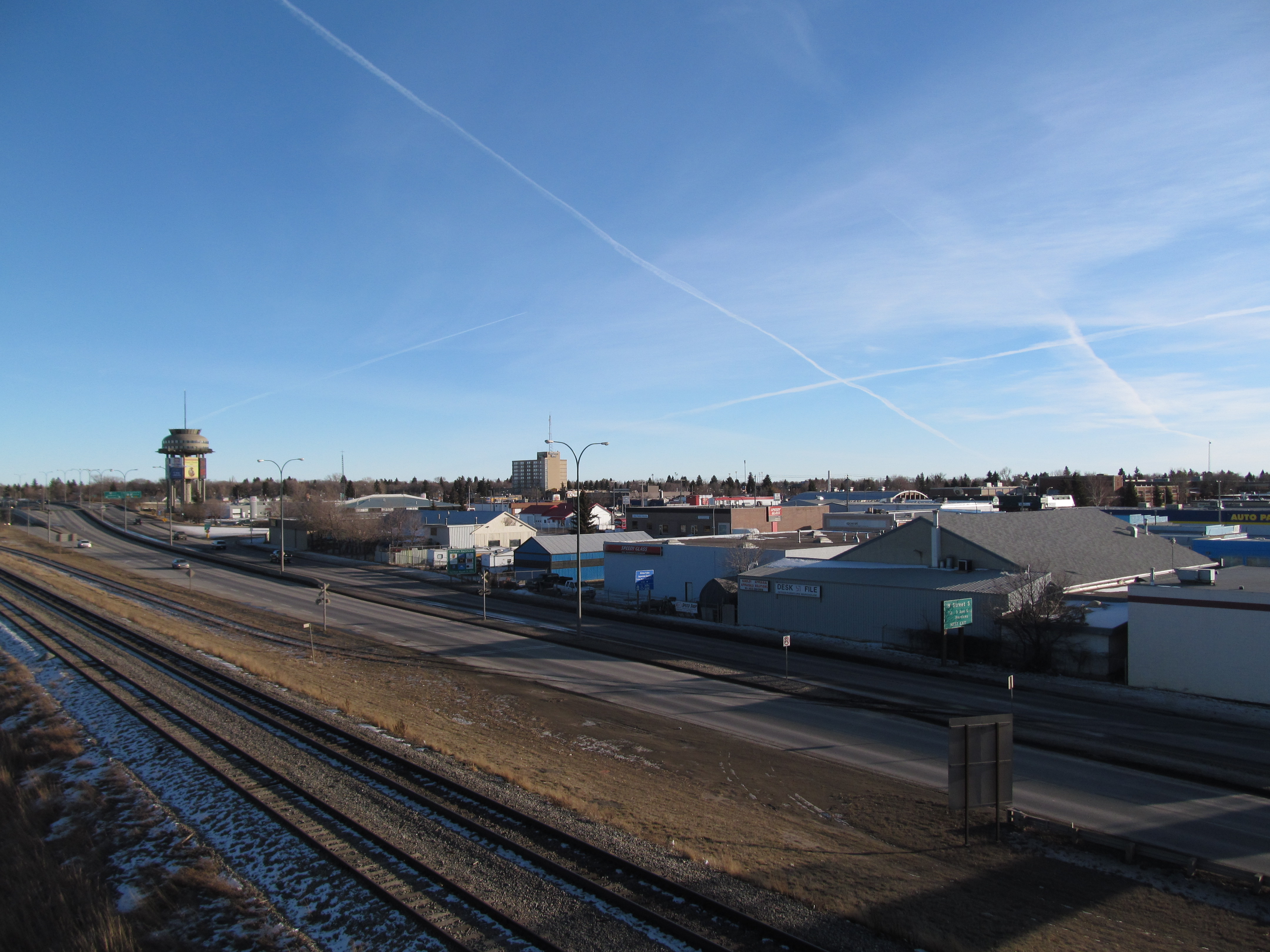
Crowsnest Trail in Lethbridge

Traffic volumes (2025) (Note: Alberta Transportation publishes yearly traffic volume data for provincial highways. The table compares the AADT at several locations along Highway 3 using data from 2025.)
Location	Volume
BC border	5,810
Ft. Macleod	8,500
Lethbridge	30,240
Taber	11,210
Medicine Hat	12,650

Highway 3 is named Crowsnest Trail in Lethbridge. Immediately east of Highway 25 it descends into the Oldman River valley, entering city limits near a trumpet interchange at Bridge Drive. It then crosses the river as the speed limit reduces to 80 km/h (50 mph). The highway interchanges with 5 Avenue N and Scenic Drive in north Lethbridge. It passes north of Park Place Mall to a diamond interchange at Stafford Drive. The freeway passes over 13 Street, to which access is provided only from the westbound direction. The freeway section ends at an interchange with Mayor Magrath Drive, the northern terminus of Highway 5. Crowsnest Trail continues east as an expressway past several at-grade intersections to 43 Street, a busy thoroughfare on the eastern city limit of Lethbridge and the northern end of Highway 4. The Red Coat Trail and CANAMEX Corridor follow Highway 4 south out of Lethbridge, while a divided Highway 3 continues east to Coaldale with a speed limit of 100 km/h (62 mph), unlike the section west of Lethbridge which has a posted limit of 110 km/h.

The Crowsnest Highway bisects Coaldale, intersecting Highway 845 in the centre of town. The speed limit returns to 110 km/h as the divided highway continues northeast, then due east into the Municipal District of Taber. It bypasses Barnwell to the south, while the final former alignment designated as Highway 3A bisects the town. At the west end of the town of Taber, Highway 864 splits north to Vauxhall. Highway 36 then splits south to its southern end at Warner, while Highway 3 continues through the centre of Taber concurrent with Highway 36 until a signalized intersection at the east end of town where the latter splits north to Brooks.

East of Taber, the divided highway ends and the two-lane road continues east across the prairies of southern Alberta past the hamlets of Purple Springs and Grassy Lake into County of Forty Mile No. 8. After Burdett it crosses Highway 879 to the town of Bow Island. Before Seven Persons, the highway enters Cypress County and intersects Highway 887 as it veers northeast to enter the city of Medicine Hat from the southwest. It becomes a divided expressway called Gershaw Drive SW that passes north of the Medicine Hat Airport. Eventually, the Crowsnest Highway ends at the Trans-Canada Highway (Highway 1); Gershaw Drive continues into downtown Medicine Hat as Highway 41A.

== History ==
=== Early years ===
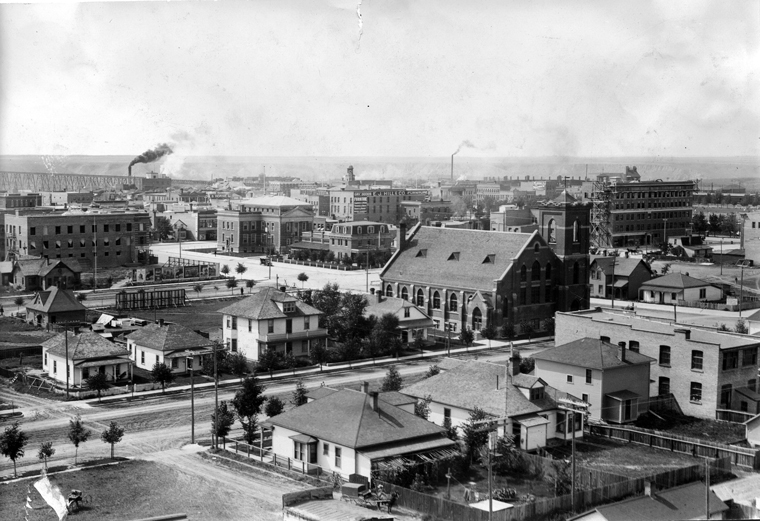
Lethbridge, seen here in 1911, was the hub of southern Alberta and the crossroads of the Red, Yellow, and Sunshine Trails that became Highways 3, 4, and 5, respectively.

Many major highways in Alberta are predated by historic railway lines for significant portions of their length, including Highways 1, 2, 4, and 12 through 16. The inception of the trail that would become Highway 3 was similar, with the 1898 completion of a main line of the Canadian Pacific Railway spurring development in the Crowsnest Pass region. The railway connected Kootenay Landing near Creston, British Columbia to Lethbridge and was the primary method of transport until a rapid increase of private automobile use in the early 20th century. In 1926, major highways in Alberta began receiving numbers; previously all routes had been identified by coloured bands tied to telephone poles. The Red Trail officially became Highway 3 in 1932.

==== Inception ====
Highway 3 has existed in Alberta on generally the same alignment since the 1910s, with only relatively minor changes made to a rough road called the Red Trail that had been carved from Medicine Hat to Crowsnest Pass. Difficult terrain on the south shore of Crowsnest Lake was a major obstacle in connecting the road to the British Columbia border. On April 29, 1903, a major rockslide buried the town of Frank and killed dozens, blocking the existing Red Trail. Work immediately began to clear the railway of debris, but a new trail north of the slide was created, connecting Frank and Bellevue. By 1906, a road had been carved through the rock to the south of the railway, replacing the temporary trail. The communities the highway ran through had grown rapidly around coal extraction following the railway's arrival. No fewer than eleven corporations began mining operations in the Crowsnest Pass between 1900 and 1909, supplying coal to the CPR and to Prairie markets. A gas explosion at the West Canadian Collieries mine in Bellevue in December 1910 killed 30 miners and one rescue worker. A larger disaster followed on June 19, 1914, when an explosion at the Hillcrest Collieries mine, also in the Pass, killed 189 workers — the deadliest coal mine disaster in Canadian history. A formal opening of the highway was held on October 8, 1917 in Blairmore. Officials had aimed for the ceremony to be held in September, but final work on the road had been delayed by the Canadian Pacific Railway who were unhappy with the location at which the highway crossed the railroad, causing the originally surveyed route to be altered. Minister of Public Works Charles Stewart had travelled from Edmonton for the event and stated that the highway was "the only natural route" for a trans-Canada highway, and would be in better condition if not for the difficult economic times. Canada was embroiled in World War I, which ended in 1918, and gravelling of the highway began in the following years.

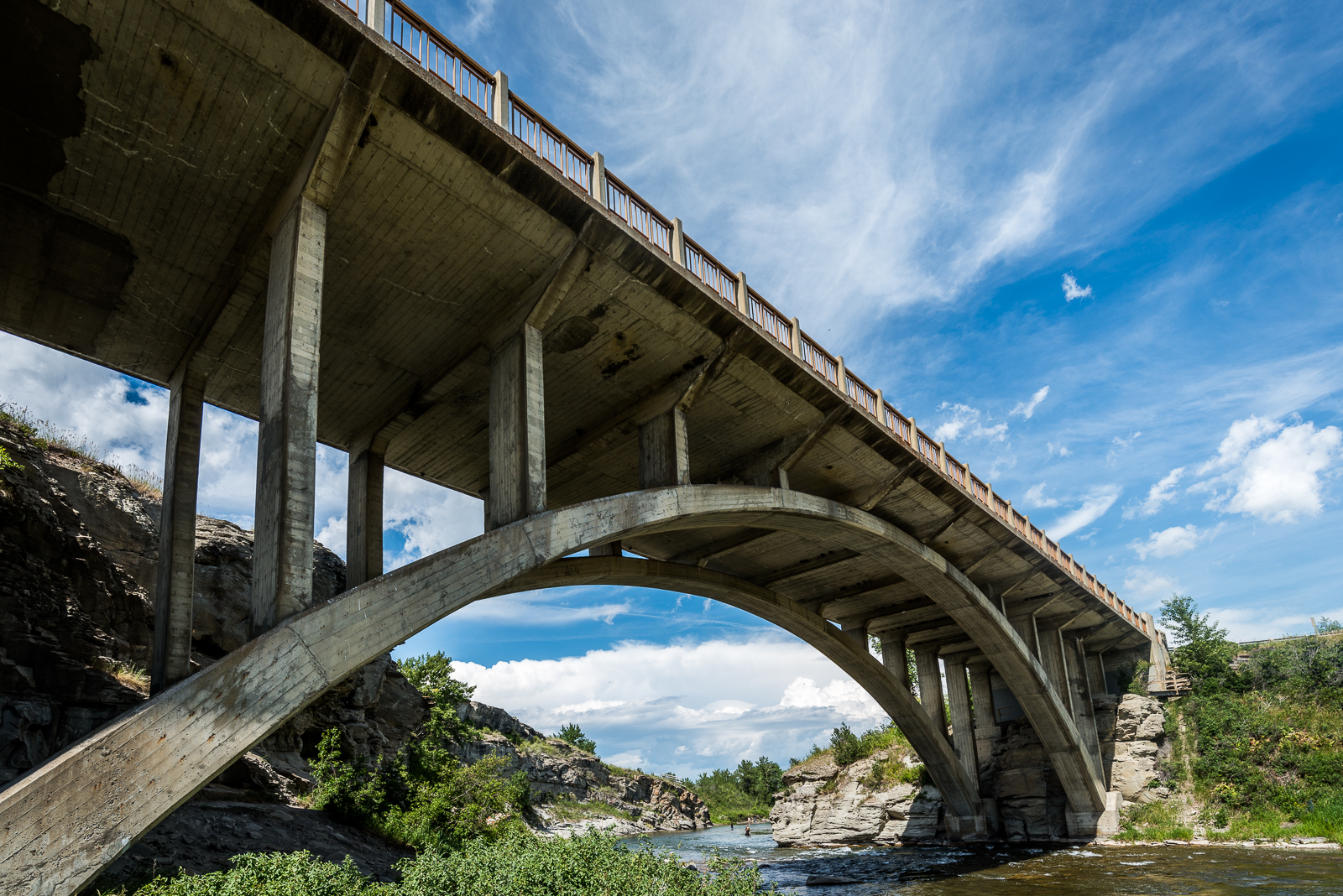
An arch bridge built in 1953 carried Highway 3 across the Crowsnest River near Lundbreck Falls until a new bridge was constructed further downstream in 1967

==== Gravelling and upgrades ====
Traffic in Alberta had always driven on the right, but British Columbia (BC) had driven on the left until 1921. The switch eliminated confusion that had been occurring on the road in the vicinity of the provincial border when traffic had to switch from one side of the road to the other. The desire for a trans-Canada route that incorporated the Red Trail continued into the 1920s with the formation of the Trans-Canada Red Trail Association. Its president, Dr. O.F. Fansett, advocated for the road to be signed as "The Trans-Canada Red Trail" in addition to the existing red markings, and for the route to be improved to an all-weather highway. By the late 1920s, the Red Trail remained a dirt road between Medicine Hat and Taber, but work began on gravelling the Lethbridge to Macleod section in late 1928 and was completed in January 1929. Crews then moved west and began gravelling between Pincher Station and Macleod. The mountain pass into BC was not open during the winter, nor was the dirt section between Taber and Medicine Hat that had not yet been gravelled. By 1928, the highway was envisioned to be part of a trans-Canada trail that stretched from Vancouver to Halifax. A 1929 map of major highways published by the Alberta Development Board listed Highway 3 as part of a southern branch of the Trans-Canada Highway that ran from Medicine Hat to Vancouver via Princeton and Spences Bridge in BC. This route included portions of present-day Highways 5A and 8, as construction of a road connecting Princeton and Hope did not begin until 1930. The northern branch connected Medicine Hat to Banff via Calgary.

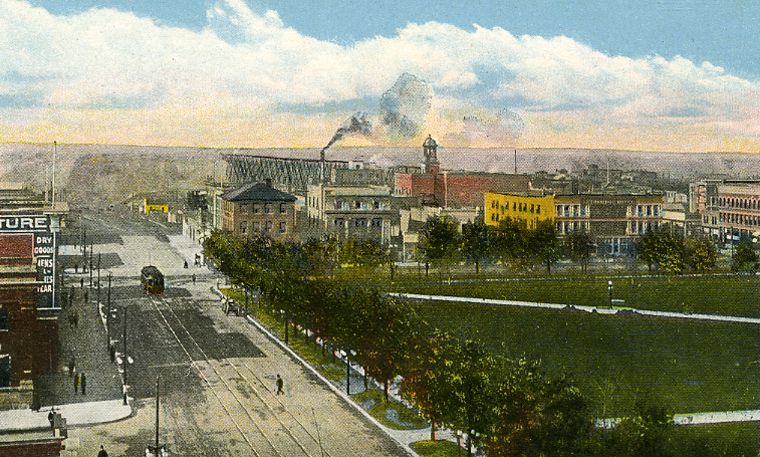
3 Avenue South in Lethbridge was part of Highway 3 until construction of the Crowsnest Trail expressway several blocks north in the 1980s

Work was also on-going to upgrade the road east of Lethbridge. In 1927, the Red Trail between Coaldale and Chin was gravelled, and the upgrading continued further east to Taber in 1928. In 1929, delegates from various communities along the route met in Taber to advocate to the provincial government for gravelling of the Red Trail from Taber to Medicine Hat. The Taber to Bow Island section was completed between 1929 and 1931, and a similar meeting was held in Lethbridge in 1931 lobbying for the remainder. The group included local officials, farmers and residents who argued that the Red Trail connected key population centres and irrigation districts in southern Alberta, and was a component of an interprovincial route from Vancouver to Winnipeg. The route was better known by tourists, they claimed, and was the only highway to the west that could economically be kept open year-round. At this time, British Columbia had done work to their portion of the highway allowing it to remain open year-round so it was desirable for Alberta to follow suit. The general sentiment among southern Alberta officials was that the Red Trail was a shorter and preferable route compared to the northern branch of the Trans-Canada through Calgary. Minister of Public Works Oran McPherson in 1934 announced that the section between Bow Island and Medicine Hat would be gravelled, permitting all-weather travel for the entire length of Highway 3. Along with similar work in southern Saskatchewan and the aforementioned British Columbia work, the project created an all-weather connection across the southern prairies. Through the rubble of the Frank Slide, a new route for the highway was carved north of the railway in 1932, and paving of Highway 3 began in August 1939. The first stretch to be completed ran west from the top of the Oldman River valley hill in West Lethbridge near University Drive to Monarch.

The local road now designated as Township Road 7-0 is the historic alignment of Highway 3 across the Castle River west of Pincher Creek and immediately north of the Pincher Creek Airport. From the east, the highway paralleled the railway until Pincher Station at the junction with Highway 6, but then continued due west to cross the river approximately 2.7 km (1.7 mi) south of the present-day crossing. Highway 3 turned northwest, then west to pass through the south side of Lundbreck on a local road now named Township Road 7-4. West of Lundbreck, the highway briefly paralleled the Crowsnest River before crossing it near Lundbreck Falls. East of Lethbridge, Highway 3 was composed of sections of road that followed a grid system for long stretches, using only roads that ran due east or due north. Exiting Lethbridge, it followed a road now designated as Highway 512 to Coaldale, then turned north into Coaldale where it turned east. South of Tempest, it turned back north, then east near the hamlet of Chin. After following the vast majority of the present-day alignment alongside the railway to Seven Persons, it diverged from the railway and curved northeast into Medicine Hat.

The Trans-Canada Highway Act, passed by Parliament in December 1949, designated a route through Calgary and Banff rather than through the Crowsnest Pass. The federal highway, construction on which began in 1950, was officially opened in 1962 following completion of its Rogers Pass section in British Columbia.

=== Later years ===
==== 1950–1970 ====
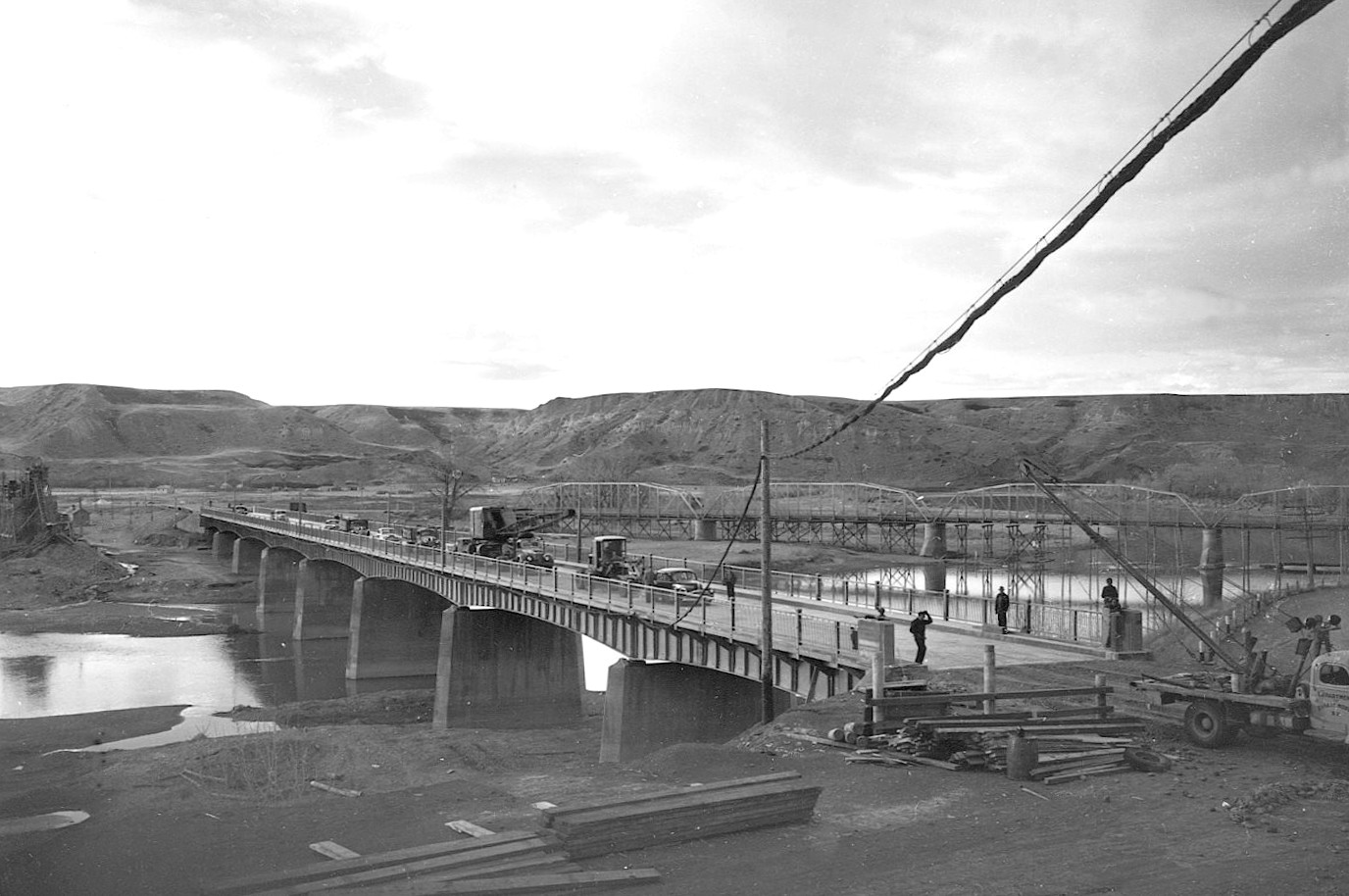
The current Highway 3 bridge over the Oldman River in Lethbridge was built in the mid-1940s, replacing a bridge to the north that had been constructed circa 1905

In 1957, Lethbridge council met to discuss the expansion of Highway 3 between Lethbridge and Coaldale to a divided highway. Highway Minister Gordon Taylor in 1958 confirmed that Alberta would complete the project in the "near future" but did not have a definite timeline. Coaldale voiced opposition to an upgraded highway bypassing the town, fearing economic losses as traffic would be diverted away from the town. Citing safety and efficiency for motorists, Taylor stated that the province would prefer for major highways to not travel through towns, but extra mileage would not be created to accomplish this. Twinning work had been completed by the mid-1960s, and the divided highway bisected Coaldale. Work began in 1963 to upgrade the highway between Coaldale and Barnwell so it could carry loads up to 72,000 pounds (33 metric tons). E.C. Lonsdale, the chairman of the Lethbridge Chamber of Commerce, stated that the region was at an economic disadvantage until the upgrade was completed. The final alignment for the upgraded highway through Barnwell had been confirmed by March 1966 with construction beginning shortly thereafter.

In 1965, the Chamber pressed Taylor for further upgrades to the highway, including safety improvements to intersections and the construction of adequate shoulders. Taylor stated that the province was doing its best to improve the road, but funds were being spread among other important highway projects in the province. "Meanwhile, you must not forget you have a completely black topped road here, one that is equal to the best roads in some of the other provinces and the United States," Taylor said. Nevertheless, the Chamber was still concerned about the condition of the road, particularly in the Crowsnest Pass region where mountainous terrain and steep grades were making upgrades difficult. There was also concern about the diversion of traffic from Highway 3 to the Trans-Canada Highway, which would have a negative effect on the economies of southern Alberta municipalities.

Highway 3 underwent major realignment in the Lethbridge area beginning in 1966. The existing route along Westside Drive and Bridge Drive was to be replaced by a new four-lane expressway to the north, requiring new bridges over the CPR tracks and an interchange at Highway 25. Most of the interchange was built in 1966, but construction of the bridge carrying Highway 25 over the new Highway 3 lagged behind and opened the following year. The twin bridges carrying the new Highway 3 over the CPR tracks west of Lethbridge also opened in 1967, as did a trumpet interchange further east at Bridge Drive on the west bank of the Oldman River. The existing two-lane bridge over the Oldman River that had been constructed in 1946 was widened to four lanes, and a partial interchange at 5 Avenue N built by 1968 completed the realignment. Highway 3 was now twinned from Monarch to Coaldale.

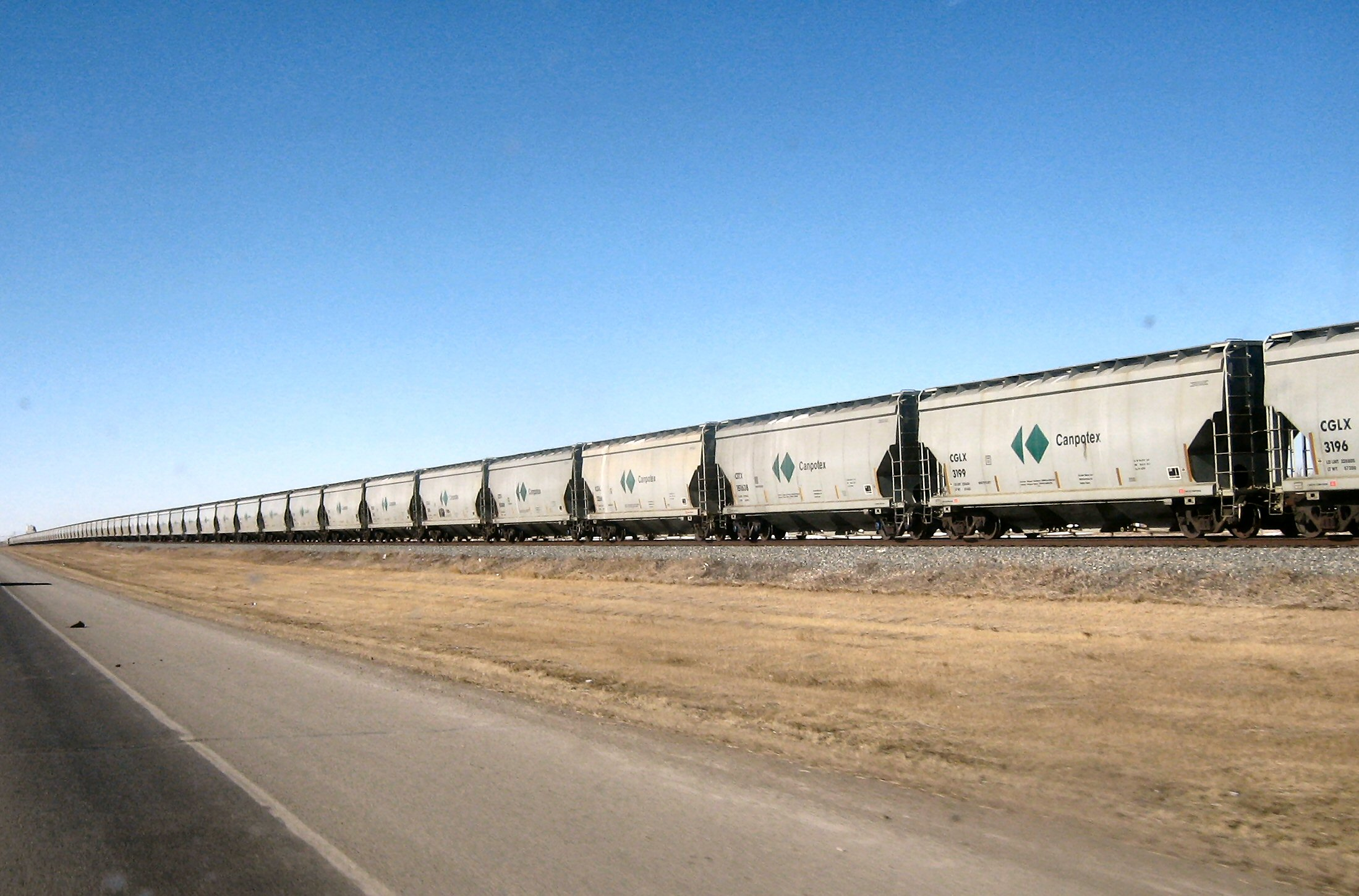
A Canadian Pacific Railway train next to Highway 3 between Lethbridge and Coaldale, the first section of Highway 3 to be twinned

In Medicine Hat, plans were presented to city council for an expressway upgrade to the Trans-Canada Highway in September 1968. The upgrade would include the construction of a diamond interchange at the existing intersection with Gershaw Drive (Highway 3) and the widening of Gershaw to a four-lane road. The interchange had been constructed by summer 1976, delayed several weeks by unstable terrain necessitating steel beams to supplement the concrete piles for the bridge.

Planning began in 1970 to establish a 4-lane corridor for Highway 3 near Crowsnest Pass. A route north of Coleman was first selected, later changed to the south in 1973 to avoid developed residential areas on the north side of Coleman. By the end of the decade, both the province and local municipality had endorsed the route. In the mid-1980s, the municipality asked the province to reconsider a route further to the north of Coleman, but it was deemed to be at an unacceptable grade. The alignment to the south of Coleman and Sentinel planned in the 1970s remains the preferred option for future upgrading.

==== Crowsnest Highway ====
Reconstruction of Highway 3 to a modern standard with shoulders continued in the 1970s. A 21.7-kilometre (13.5 mi) segment from Medicine Hat to west of Severn Persons was completed in 1973, with grading for another 21.7 km west of Seven Persons done in 1974. Several local Social Credit Party Members of the Legislative Assembly (MLA) expressed dissatisfaction with the rate at which the work was progressing and the reasoning given by Highways Minister Clarence Copithorne. He cited a labour shortage and the fact that provincial funds were being spread across multiple projects, and also the fact that drivers should not be subjected to overly lengthy construction zones. The MLAs disagreed, saying that Alberta's oil and gas revenue should be enough to expedite Highway 3 work, and that their constituents preferred for the work to be done sooner even if it meant longer stretches of the road would be under construction at a given time.

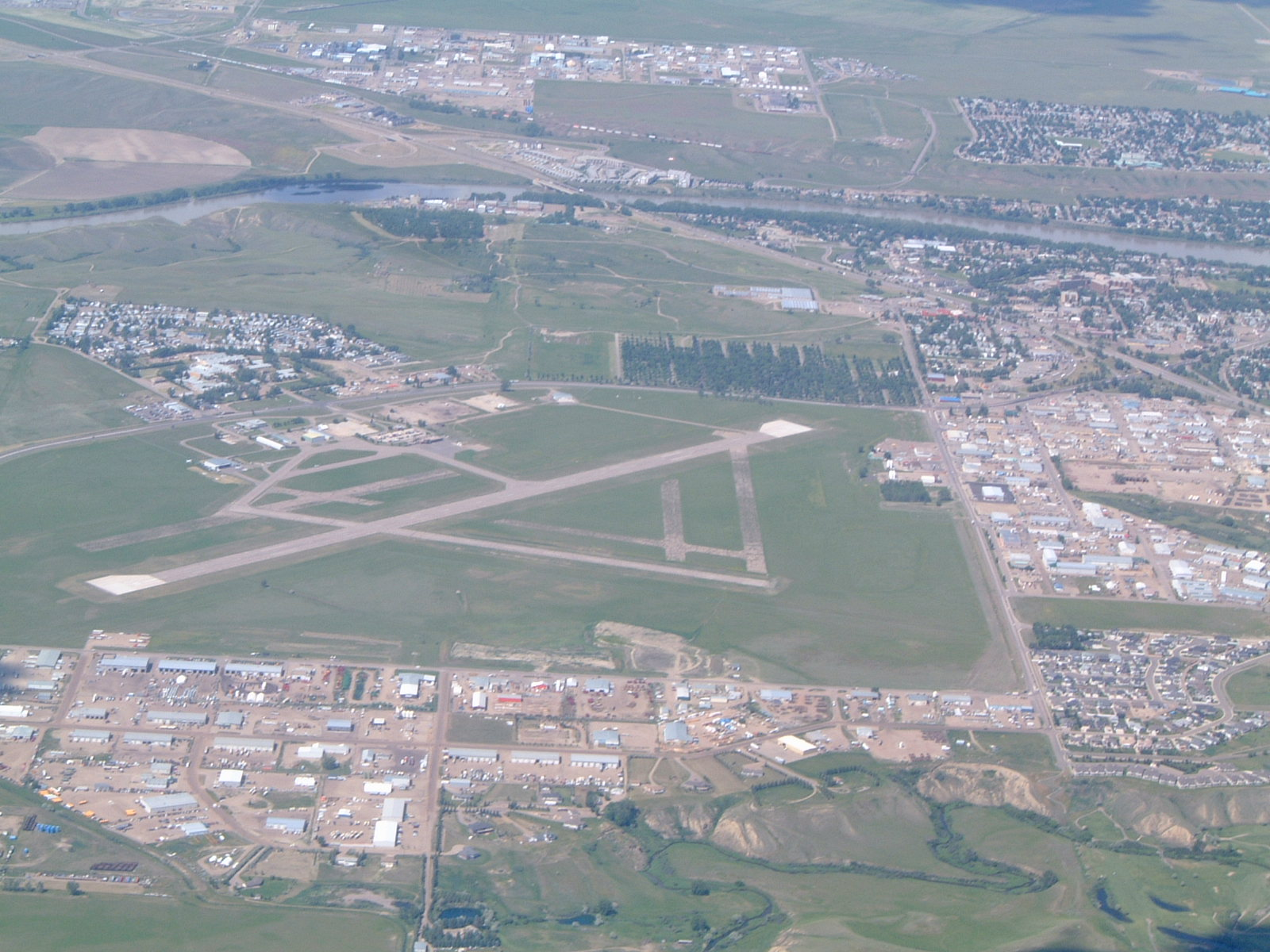
The Crowsnest Highway ends at the Trans-Canada Highway northeast of the Medicine Hat Airport.

A group of southern Albertans called the Crowsnest Highway 3 Association met annually in the 1970s with the intent of promoting the highway and advocating to the provincial government for improvements. The group included local officials and residents who advertised Highway 3 as a rival to the Trans-Canada Highway and a more scenic route between the prairies and the west coast. Their efforts proved worthwhile; to attract travellers who might better identify with a route that has only one name, Alberta officially renamed Highway 3 as "Crowsnest Highway 3" in 1977 with British Columbia following suit for their portion through to Hope. Members of the Association collaborated with the government on new highway shields, a sign that denotes the designated number of the highway. They began to appear in both provinces by the end of the decade. British Columbia had its own shield and in Alberta two versions of the shield were initially erected; a white number 3 on a crow background within the shield, and a more standard Alberta highway shield with the usual black number on a white background, but with a crow perched on top peering down at the number. The first variant prevailed and remains unchanged through the 2010s. Long-term planning for a Highway 3 expressway was on-going near the end of the decade, with minor changes to the two-lane route near the BC border in the late 1970s.

At their 1979 meeting in Lethbridge, the Association pushed for wider recognition and advertisement of the Crowsnest route in tourism offices across Canada, and also hoped for the Crowsnest moniker to be expanded to include the Trans-Canada Highway from Medicine Hat to the Saskatchewan border. They would later create a 16-page brochure that highlighted points of interest along the Crowsnest Highway en route to Expo 86, a world's fair held in Vancouver in October 1986, again presenting it as a better alternative to the Trans-Canada Highway. In 1979, a group similarly lobbied for a named highway across the southern prairies including Alberta Highway 501 and Saskatchewan Highway 13. The Crowsnest efforts were used as an example of the traffic that could be brought to a route when it has a cohesive name.

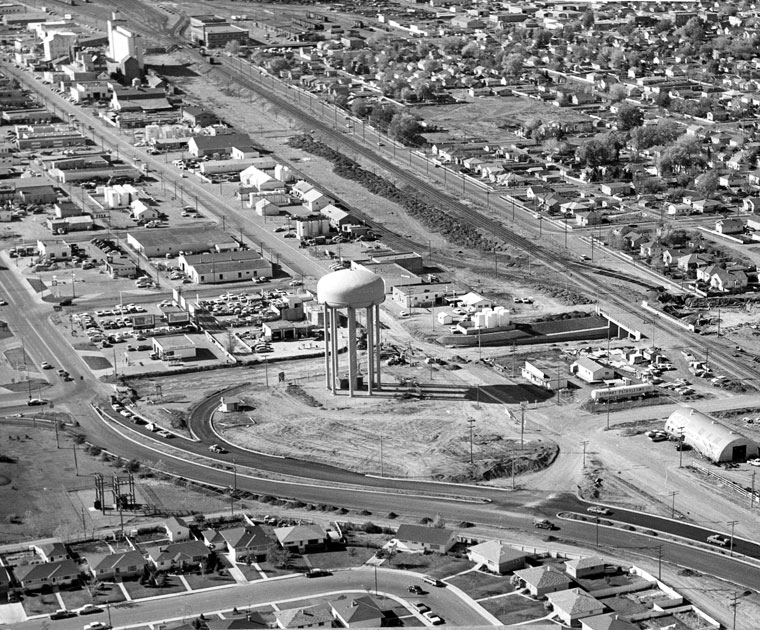
Looking west along the future Crowsnest Trail corridor in Lethbridge in 1964

==== Lethbridge realignment ====
Prior to construction of the Crowsnest Trail expressway in Lethbridge, the highway crossed the Oldman River then curved south underneath the High Level Bridge, following portions of 1 Avenue and 3 Avenue downtown. After several years of planning, a $50 million realignment of Highway 3 through the centre of the city was presented to city council by Calgary engineers in September 1981, receiving favourable comments. The new corridor was designated as one of several "Major Continuous Corridors" in the province. It involved the construction of a new four-lane expressway from 43 Street to the existing Highway 3 on the east bank of the Oldman River between North and West Lethbridge, and new interchanges at 5 Avenue N and Scenic Drive. The relocation of a Canadian Pacific Railway yard from downtown Lethbridge was required; it was moved to Kipp, west of Coalhurst. Construction was estimated to be completed by 1985, with the province paying for 90% of the project and the city covering the remaining 10%. Land acquisition was to cost between $2 and $12 million. Work began in 1983 and was completed in 1986. Interchanges were constructed on Crowsnest Trail at Stafford Drive, 13 Street and Mayor Magrath Drive at a cost of more than $50 million.

==== Monarch interchange ====
Before the four-lane bypass south of Monarch across the Oldman River was constructed, Highway 3 passed through Monarch and crossed the river southwest of the town on a bridge built in 1957. This stretch is now designated as Highway 3A. The interchange at Highway 3A (then Highway 3) and Highway 23 near Monarch was completed in 1984. Highway 23 had been shifted slightly west to eliminate two 90° bends in the route near Nobleford. The new interchange was initially criticized for being confusing, causing many drivers to make wrong turns. Counter-intuitively, traffic continuing westbound through the interchange on Highway 3 exited to the right, passing underneath Highway 23. Southbound traffic on Highway 23 turning west onto Highway 3 had to turn left across the westbound lanes to access the aforementioned single lane ramp. Macleod MLA LeRoy Fjordbotten promised improved signage and lighting for the interchange in early 1984. Fort Macleod Mayor Wes Olmstead was concerned that the interchange, along with upgrades of Highways 519 and 520, encouraged northbound traffic to use Highway 23 instead of continuing west to his community and using Highway 2. The towns of Pincher Creek and Nanton had similar concerns about the diversion of traffic caused by the new interchange. Transport Minister Henry Kroeger disagreed and thought the concerns were unwarranted; of Fort Macleod, he stated, "the town won't disappear as a result of the interchange." Alberta had long-term plans for Highway 23 to be twinned, and for the Monarch interchange to be expanded to a partial cloverleaf. The possibility of a southern Monarch bypass had already been identified by the mid-1980s.

An announcement for the construction of passing lanes on the two-lane Highway 3 between Monarch and Fort Macleod came in 1985, though Fort Macleod Mayor Olmstead stated the project was simply delaying the inevitable twinning that would be required for the route. He remained concerned about the loss of traffic to his community caused by the Monarch interchange, and was confident that twinning of Highways 2 and 3 would offset the loss. Twinning of both routes continued in the late 1980s.

==== Export Highway and east twinning ====
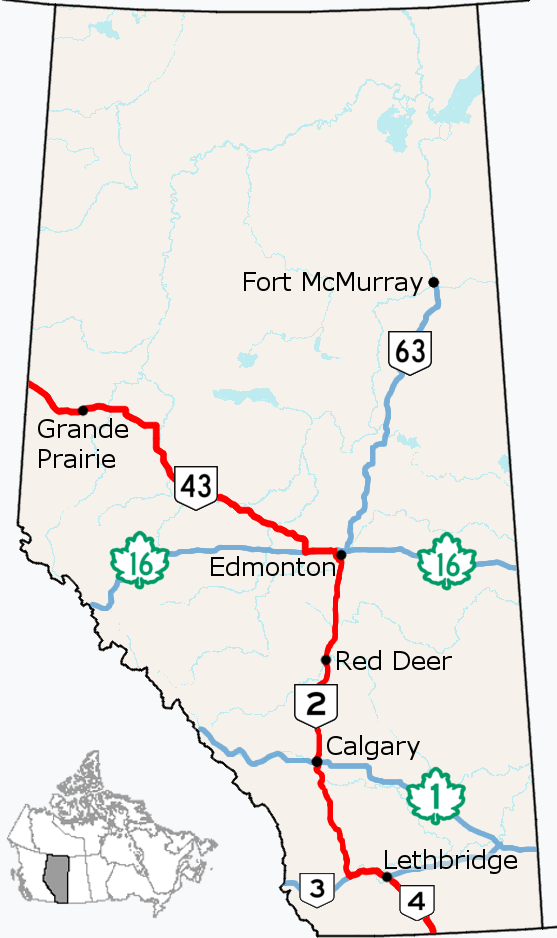
Highway 3 between Fort Macleod and Lethbridge is a part of a north–south trade corridor in Alberta that connects Alaska to Mexico. Alberta continues work to upgrade the entire corridor to a divided highway.

A bypass of Blairmore was completed in October 1983 after more than a year of construction. The highway was formerly routed down Main Street of the community (20 Avenue) at a reduced speed limit. At the east end of Blairmore, a new bridge over the Crowsnest River was constructed, and the highway curves north around the community before rejoining the existing alignment west of the town. The $3.9 million project was estimated to save almost 15 minutes of driving time through Blairmore. The Ministry of Transportation estimated that work on a Coleman bypass would likely proceed within five years, but this did not come to fruition.

In 1989, Alberta announced plans to twin the entire length of the Export Highway, a name given to the southern portion of Alberta's north–south trade corridor that includes Highway 2 from Calgary to Fort Macleod, Highway 3 between Fort Macleod and Lethbridge, and the entire length of Highway 4 from Lethbridge to the United States border. The plan was for Highway 2 to be twinned first, followed by Highway 3 then 4. Highway 3 required twinning only from Fort Macleod to Monarch, as the remainder to Lethbridge had already been completed. Work included the construction of two new steel bridges over the Oldman River in 1996 which formed a bypass to the south of Monarch. The former alignment of the highway through Monarch was re-designated as Highway 3A, relegating the previously controversial interchange at Highway 23 to service of local Monarch traffic. Travellers continuing west on Highway 3 toward Fort Macleod from Lethbridge no longer had to exit the highway and reduce their speed to navigate a single lane ramp, and were not at risk of missing the exit and accidentally proceeding north on Highway 23 toward Vulcan. Twinning on Highway 3 west of Monarch continued into 1997 and was completed at a cost of $31 million.

Though Alberta had prioritized the Export Highway, twinning work was also progressing east of Coaldale in the mid-1990s. Alberta Transportation and Utilities minister Steve West announced in 1995 that Barnwell would not be bypassed, and the twinned highway would instead continue on its existing alignment through the centre of the village at a reduced speed limit. Some members of the community opposed the decision, citing increased vehicular safety of the recommended bypass alignment south of the village, and a safer environment for pedestrians who would not have to cross highway traffic. Representatives from Barnwell acknowledged that bypassing the town might be detrimental to growth of the community. Local MLA Ron Hierath stated that residents who lived north of the old highway were in favour of the bypass being constructed to the south of the town, while residents on the south side preferred the alignment through the centre of the town. Amidst the controversy, the decision was later reversed by West, and the twinned Highway 3 was constructed south of Barnwell with the former alignment designated as Highway 3A. After a slight delay in 1995, twinning continued in 1996 and had been completed to Cranford by the end of 1997, and to Taber by the end of the decade. In 1999, Infrastructure minister Ed Stelmach stated that twinning the remainder of the highway from Taber to Medicine Hat was not a priority, despite pleas from local officials.

On July 2, 2020, Jason Kenney announced a $150 million plan to twin a 46-kilometre (29 mi) section of Highway 3 from Taber to Burdett, including a new four-lane bypass of Grassy Lake. Construction began in 2021 and will be completed in 2026.

== Future ==
The Ministry of Transportation and Economic Corridors has long-term plans to upgrade the entire length of Highway 3 to a freeway, requiring major bypasses of Fort Macleod and Lethbridge. The proposed route for the Lethbridge bypass would split from Highway 3 west of Coalhurst, running north past the town to a new interchange at Highway 25. It would continue east across the Oldman River on new bridges, bypassing Lethbridge to reach a newly extended Highway 4 (temporarily designated as Highway 4X) northeast of Lethbridge. It would rejoin the existing highway east of Chin. A freeway upgrade of Crowsnest Trail was considered, but would require extensive reconstruction and demolition within the corridor through Lethbridge, and twinning of the existing bridge across the Oldman River. The city of Lethbridge expressed their disapproval of this alignment, eliminating it early in the study process.

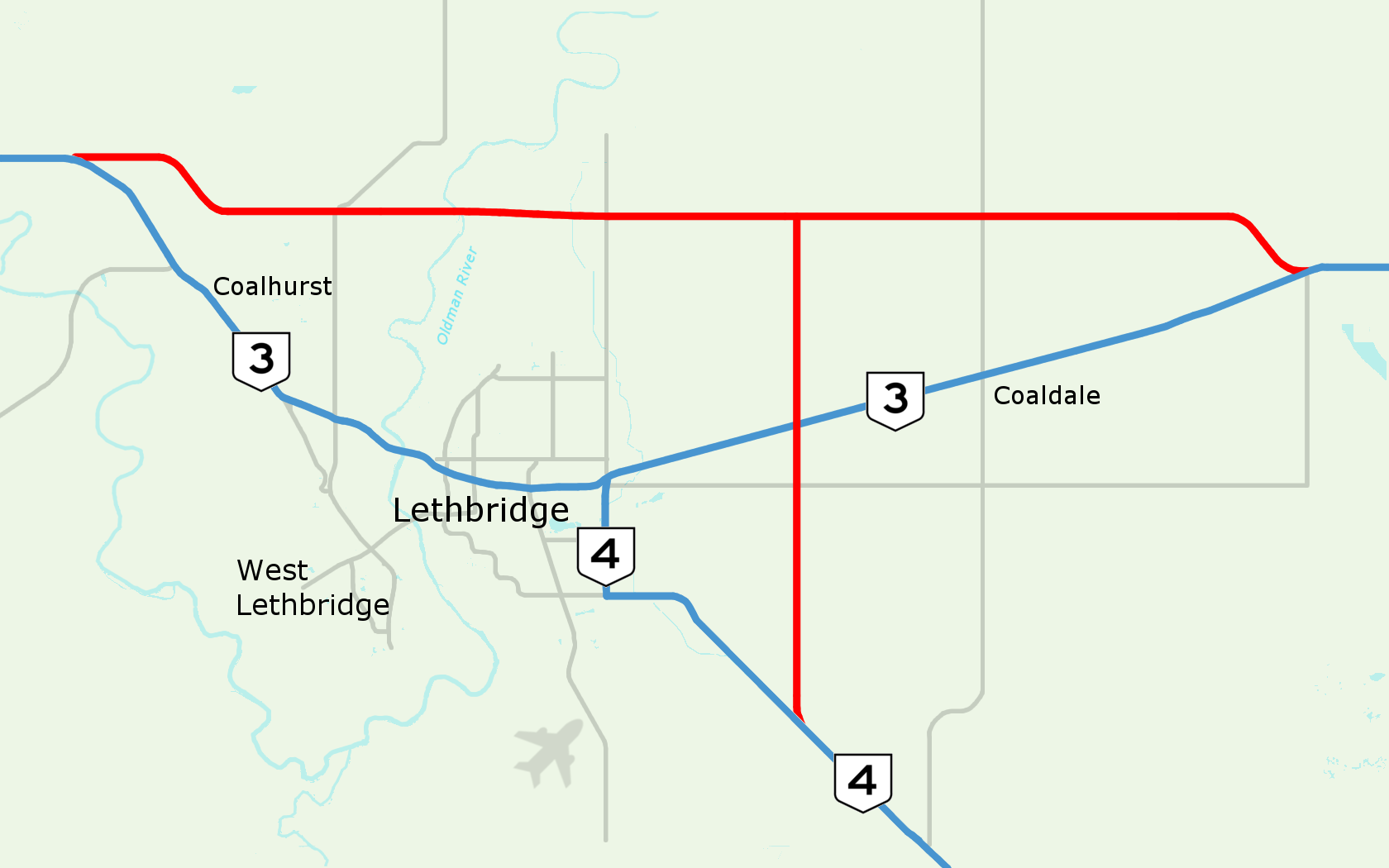
The proposed realignment of Highways 3 and 4 in Lethbridge, highlighted in red

A functional planning study was completed in 2008 to identify the optimal alignment for the Fort Macleod bypass. The preferred alignment has the new Highway 3, temporarily designated as Highway 3X, splitting southeast from the existing Highway 3, west of the intersection with Highway 810. It would meet a newly extended Highway 2 at an interchange southwest of Fort Macleod before continuing to a second interchange with the existing two-lane section of Highway 2 between Fort Macleod and Cardston. Stage 1 of the project would include only the Highway 2 bypass, with the extension to Highway 3 west of Highway 810 completed in Stage 2. A Medicine Hat bypass of the Trans-Canada Highway (Highway 1) is also proposed, which would involve the construction of a large interchange with directional flyovers at Highway 3 and the newly realigned Highway 1 southwest of Medicine Hat.

A 2004 study assessed the reduction of accesses to Highways 3 and 36 in Taber as a stopgap measure until a bypass of the town is constructed. Highway 3 currently has a speed limit of 50 km/h (31 mph) and seven at-grade intersections in Taber. In April 2008, the Ministry of Transportation published a study analyzing twinning and potential changes to the alignments of Highways 3 and 6 in the vicinity of Pincher Creek, including the construction of a diamond interchange at Highway 6. Residents who could be affected by the changed routes were consulted as part of the study.

In 2010, a study plotted the routing of a bypass to the north of Seven Persons with plans for a diamond interchange at Highway 887. A 2013 study identified the preferred alignment for a freeway bypass of Burdett and Bow Island, likely to be operated as a divided expressway until the freeway is completed long-term. Both towns would be bypassed to the south, with an interchange constructed at Highway 879.

In 2025, Alberta announced plans for the first stage of a Fort Macleod bypass that will realign a short section of the westbound lanes east of town, eliminating the existing large median. Work on this realignment began in 2026.

== Major intersections ==
Rural/specialized municipality	Location	km	mi	Destinations	Notes
Municipality of Crowsnest Pass		0.0	0.0	Highway 3 west (Crowsnest Highway) – Fernie, Cranbrook	Continental Divide; continuation into British Columbia
Municipality of Crowsnest Pass		0.0	0.0	Crowsnest Pass – el. 1,358 m (4,455 ft)	
Municipality of Crowsnest Pass	Coleman	15.6	9.7	Highway 40 north (Forestry Trunk Road)	
Municipality of Crowsnest Pass	Blairmore	18.0	11.2	20 Avenue east	
Municipality of Crowsnest Pass	Blairmore	21.2	13.2	20 Avenue west	
Municipality of Crowsnest Pass	Frank	23.4	14.5	153 Street	Passes Frank Slide
Municipality of Crowsnest Pass	Bellevue	25.8	16.0	9 Avenue / 213 Street	Access to Hillcrest
Municipality of Crowsnest Pass		30.3	18.8	East Hillcrest Drive	Access to Hillcrest
M.D. of Pincher Creek No. 9	Burmis	35.2	21.9	Highway 507 south – Beaver Mines	
M.D. of Pincher Creek No. 9		39.7	24.7	Highway 3A east – Lundbreck Falls	Highway 3A is unsigned
M.D. of Pincher Creek No. 9		41.8	26.0	Highway 22 north (Cowboy Trail) – Longview, Black Diamond, Turner Valley	
M.D. of Pincher Creek No. 9	Lundbreck	44.4	27.6		
M.D. of Pincher Creek No. 9		47.8	29.7	Highway 3A west	Highway 3A is unsigned
M.D. of Pincher Creek No. 9	Cowley	51.9	32.2	Highway 510 north	
M.D. of Pincher Creek No. 9	Pincher Station	61.9	38.5	Highway 6 south (Cowboy Trail) – Pincher Creek, Waterton Park	To U.S. Border (Chief Mountain Border Crossing)
M.D. of Pincher Creek No. 9		65.3	40.6	Highway 785	
Piikani No. 147	Brocket	77.0	47.8	Highway 786 south	
M.D. of Willow Creek No. 26		104.4	64.9	Highway 810 south – Glenwood	
M.D. of Willow Creek No. 26	Fort Macleod	105.4	65.5	Highway 2 north – Calgary	West end of Highway 2 concurrency; west end of CANAMEX Corridor (follows Highway 2 north); Highway 2 exit 89
M.D. of Willow Creek No. 26	Fort Macleod	108.4	67.4	One-way road pair begins	
M.D. of Willow Creek No. 26	Fort Macleod	109.4	68.0	Highway 811 north (6 Avenue)	
M.D. of Willow Creek No. 26	Fort Macleod	109.8	68.2	One-way road pair ends	
M.D. of Willow Creek No. 26	Fort Macleod	110.6	68.7	Highway 2 south – Cardston, Waterton Park, )	East end of Highway 2 concurrency; to U.S. Border (Piegan–Carway Border Crossing; west end of Red Coat Trail concurrency
M.D. of Willow Creek No. 26		131.8	81.9	Highway 3A east to Highway 23 north – Monarch, Vulcan	Eastbound access to Highway 23
M.D. of Willow Creek No. 26–Lethbridge County boundary		134.0	83.3	Crosses Oldman River	
Lethbridge County		137.1	85.2	Highway 3A west / Highway 23 north – Monarch, Vulcan	Partial interchange; westbound exit and eastbound entrance
Lethbridge County	Kipp	146.3	90.9	Highway 509 south / UAR 205 north – Stand Off	
Lethbridge County	Coalhurst	148.4	92.2		
Lethbridge County		151.0	93.8	Westside Drive W (Highway 3A east)	Partial interchange; eastbound exit and westbound entrance; Highway 3A is unsigned
Lethbridge County		153.1	95.1	Highway 25 north / University Drive south – West Lethbridge, Picture Butte	Partial cloverleaf interchange
City of Lethbridge		155.0	96.3	Bridge Drive W	Trumpet interchange; formerly Highway 3A west
City of Lethbridge		155.4	96.6	Crosses Oldman River	
City of Lethbridge		155.6	96.7	Access road to Oldman River valley	
City of Lethbridge		156.1	97.0	5 Avenue N (to Scenic Drive)	Eastbound exit and westbound entrance
City of Lethbridge		156.3	97.1	1 Avenue S to Highway 4 / Highway 5 – City Centre	Eastbound exit only; east end of Red Coat Trail concurrency
City of Lethbridge		156.8	97.4	Scenic Drive	Half-diamond interchange; westbound exit and eastbound entrance
City of Lethbridge		157.7	98.0	Stafford Drive	Diamond interchange
City of Lethbridge		158.5	98.5	13 Street	Westbound to northbound exit only
City of Lethbridge		159.2	98.9	19 Street (to 3 Avenue S)	Eastbound right-in/right-out
City of Lethbridge		159.4	99.0	Mayor Magrath Drive to Highway 4 / Highway 5	Interchange; to Lethbridge Airport
City of Lethbridge		161.4	100.3	1 Avenue S (Highway 512 east) to Highway 4 south / I-15 south	Eastbound exit only
City of Lethbridge		161.8	100.5	43 Street (Highway 4 south) to Highway 5 south / I-15 south / Highway 843 north – Coutts, U.S. Border, Great Falls	East end of CANAMEX Corridor (follows Highway 4 south)
Lethbridge County	Coaldale	174.3	108.3	Highway 845 (20 Street) – Lomond, Raymond	
Lethbridge County		184.5	114.6	Highway 512 south – Stirling	
Lethbridge County	Chin	187.7	116.6	Range Road 190	Chin access road
M.D. of Taber		199.1	123.7	Highway 3A east (Range Road 175) – Barnwell	Highway 3A is unsigned
M.D. of Taber	Barnwell	200.7	124.7	Heritage Road (Range Road 174)	
M.D. of Taber		202.6	125.9	Highway 3A west (Range Road 173) – Barnwell	Highway 3A is unsigned
M.D. of Taber	Taber	207.8	129.1	Highway 864 north (Park Road)	
M.D. of Taber	Taber	208.6	129.6	Highway 36 south – Warner, Coutts	West end of Highway 36 concurrency
M.D. of Taber	Taber	211.2	131.2	Highway 36 north (64 Street) – Vauxhall, Brooks	East end of Highway 36 concurrency
M.D. of Taber	Grassy Lake	242.6	150.7	Highway 877 south – Skiff	
County of Forty Mile No. 8	Burdett	255.2	158.6		
County of Forty Mile No. 8		260.8	162.1	Highway 879 – Brooks, Foremost	
County of Forty Mile No. 8	Bow Island	266.7	165.7		
County of Forty Mile No. 8		286.1	177.8	Highway 885 south – Etzikom	
Cypress County	Seven Persons	301.8	187.5	Highway 887 south – Orion	
City of Medicine Hat		321.4	199.7	Highway 523 west (Holsom Road SW)	
City of Medicine Hat		322.2	200.2	Viscount Avenue SW – Medicine Hat Airport	
City of Medicine Hat		324.0	201.3	Highway 1 (TCH) – Calgary, Swift Current Gershaw Drive SW (Highway 41A east) – Downtown Medicine Hat	Diamond interchange; through traffic follows Highway 41A (unsigned)
1.000 mi = 1.609 km; 1.000 km = 0.621 mi: Concurrency terminus; Incomplete access

== See also ==
- Crowsnest Highway
- Yellowhead Highway
- Transportation in Lethbridge
