= Lundbreck Falls =

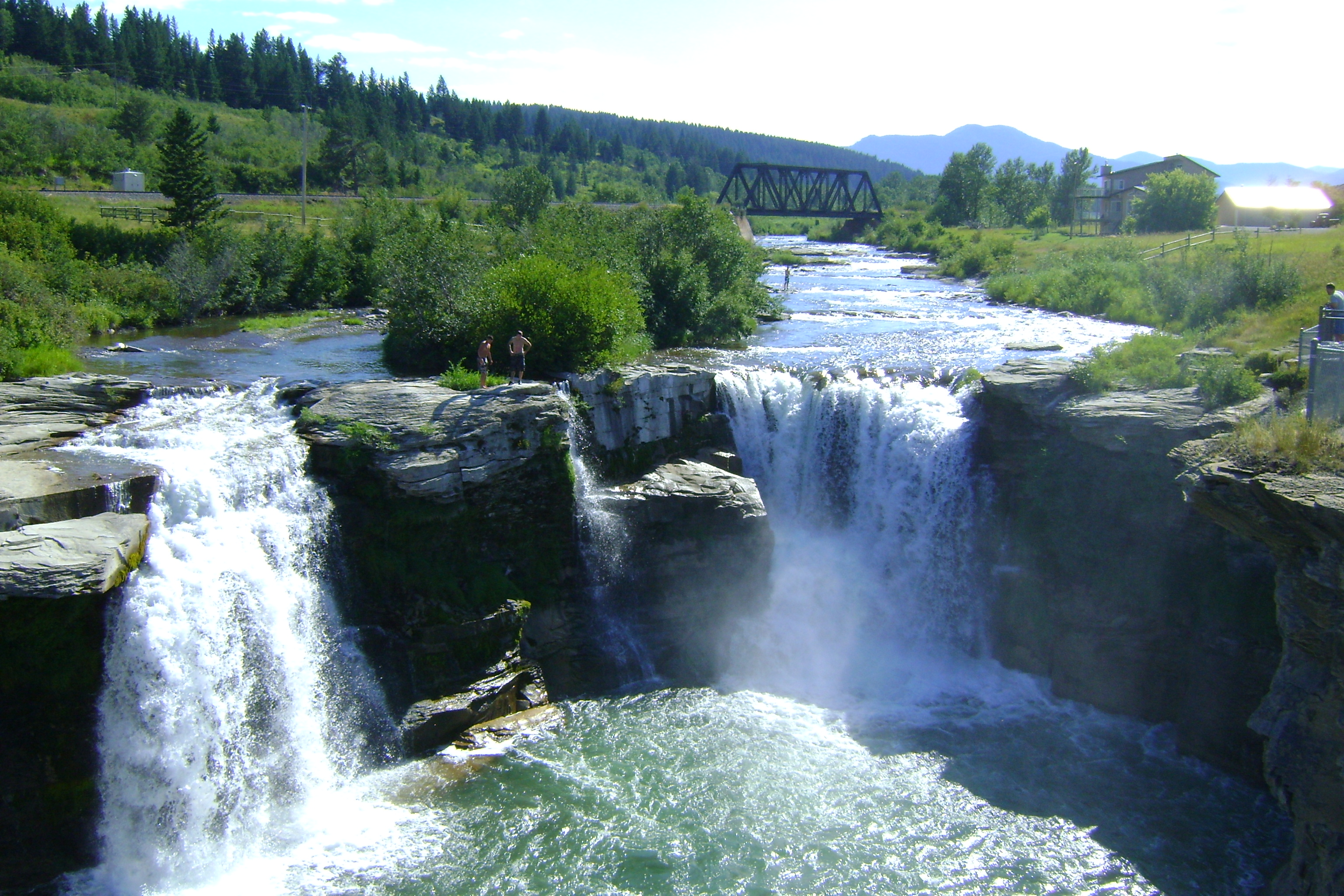

- Location within Alberta
- Location: Pincher Creek M.D. No. 9, Alberta
- Coordinates: 49°34′56″N 114°12′31″W
- Total height: 12 m (39 ft)
- Number of drops: 3
- Watercourse: Crowsnest River

Lundbreck Falls is a waterfall of the Crowsnest River located in southwestern Alberta, Canada near the hamlet of Lundbreck.

It is adjacent to the Highway 3A crossing of the Crowsnest River, approximately 1.2 km (0.75 mi) off the Crowsnest Highway (Highway 3), between Pincher Creek and Crowsnest Pass. The falls have a drop of about 12 metres (39 ft). Visitors can view Lundbreck Falls from the observation platform as well as hiking to below the falls.

A day use area and an overnight campground are maintained at the falls site.

== See also ==
- List of waterfalls
- List of waterfalls of Canada
