= Peigan =

Peigan refers to two Native tribes in the Blackfoot Confederacy:

- Northern Peigan, in Alberta, Canada
- Piegan Blackfeet in Montana, USA

== See also ==
- Pagan
