= Crowsnest River =

River in Alberta, Canada

Coordinates: 49°35′59″N 114°02′57″W

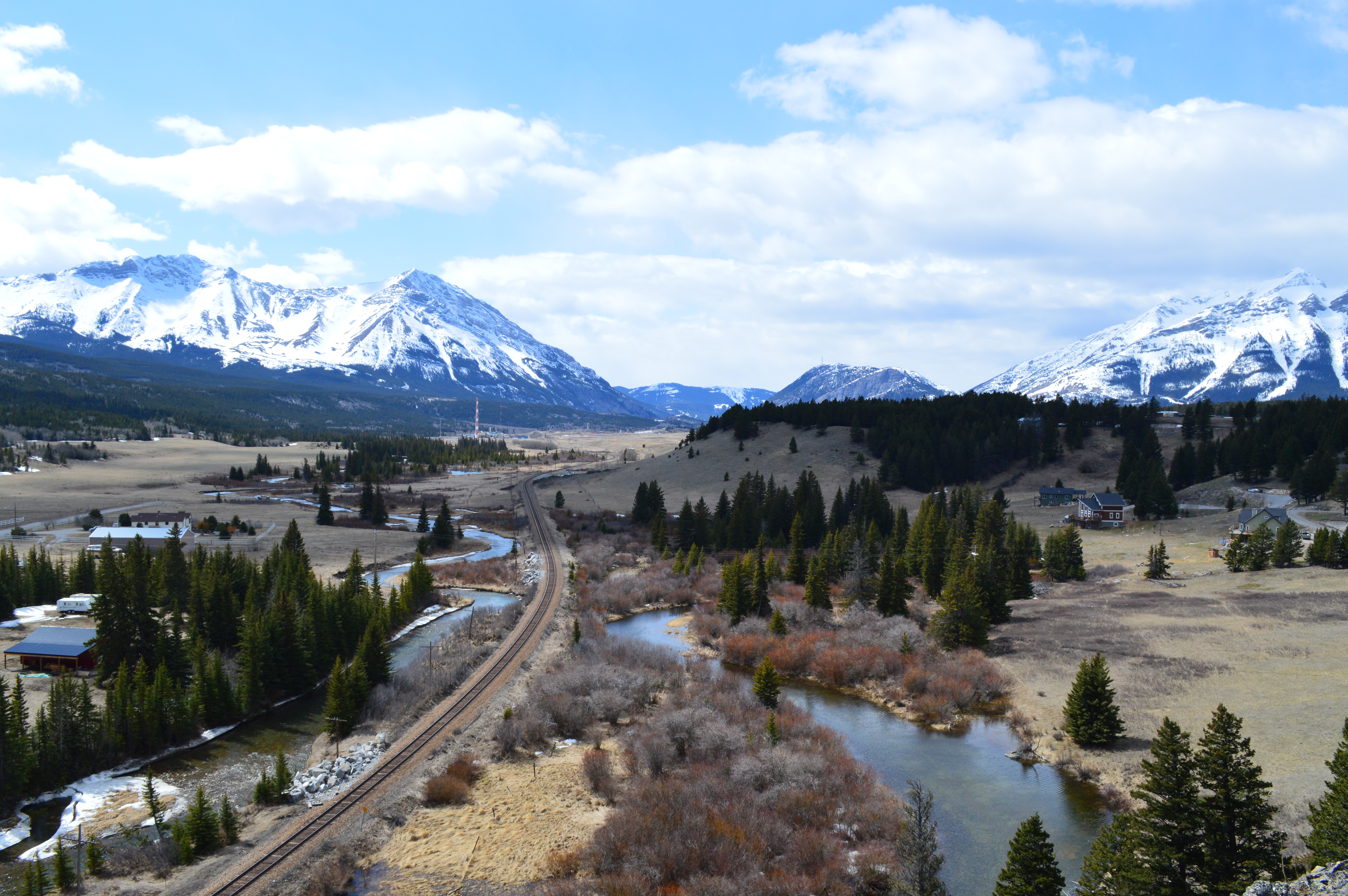
The Crowsnest River meanders through its valley west of Coleman, Alberta, in April 2014

The Crowsnest River is a tributary to the Oldman River in southwestern Alberta, Canada.

== Location ==
From its source in Crowsnest Lake at an elevation of about 1,357 metres (4,452 ft) in the Canadian Rockies, Crowsnest River meanders eastward through the Municipality of Crowsnest Pass and Frank Slide. It passes into the foothills near Burmis and reaches the western margin of the Alberta plains near Lundbreck. It then joins the Oldman River Reservoir at an elevation of about 1,110 metres (3,640 ft).

== Fish species ==
The Crowsnest River is productive with an insect population fueling a world-class sport fishery for rainbow, westslope cutthroat, bull, hybrid trout ("cutbow" cutthroat and rainbow trout crosses), brown trout (below Lundbreck Falls), mountain whitefish, and various species of suckers.

== See also ==
- List of rivers of Alberta
