= Chin, Alberta =

Chin
- Hamlet
- Location of Chin Chin (Canada)
- Coordinates: 49°45′48″N 112°26′45″W
- Country: Canada
- Province: Alberta
- Region: Southern Alberta
- Census division: 2
- Municipal district: Lethbridge County

Government
  - Type: Unincorporated
  - Governing body: Lethbridge County Council

Area (2021)
  - Land: 0.09 km^{2} (0.035 sq mi)

Population (2021)
  - Total: 83
  - Density: 916.1/km^{2} (2,373/sq mi)
- Time zone: UTC−06:00 (Alberta Time)
- Area codes: 403, 587, 825

Chin is a hamlet in southern Alberta, Canada within Lethbridge County. It is located 1 kilometre (0.62 mi) north of Highway 3, approximately 27 kilometres (17 mi) east of Lethbridge.

== Toponymy ==
Chin derives its name from a nearby hill, Chin Butte. The hill was so named because, when viewed from a distance, it resembled a chin to surveyors from the Geological Survey of Canada in 1884. In the Blackfoot language, the hill is called mísstoan ("beard").

== History ==
=== Before settlement ===
A 1975 archaeological investigation found two sites of interest near Chin, overlooking Chin Coulee. One contained 48 stone features ranging from tipi rings to hearths, suggesting the area was used frequently by Indigenous peoples for short-term camping purposes. Projectile points at this site were dated as early as 3,200 BCE, while butchered animal bones suggested winter occupation around the year 479 CE.

=== Founding and development: 1893-1969 ===
The Canadian Pacific Railway (CPR) established a stop in the area in 1893. A Chin post office opened in 1910, a grain elevator was opened by Pioneer Grain (late Richardson International) by the end of the decade.

Chin was prospected for oil in 1928, but the settlement developed primarily into an agrarian economy. By the mid-1930s, Chin contained three grain elevators, operated by the Alberta Wheat Pool, Ellison Milling Co., and the Alberta Pacific Grain Company. Pioneer Grain had ceased to operate in the area.

After struggling to find a permanent postmaster throughout the decade of the 1950s, Chin's post office closed in April 1960.

==== Lassiter Project: 1945-51 ====
One of Chin's most prominent early residents was Oscar Bruce Lassiter (1886 – 1977), who moved there from Gatesville, North Carolina in 1917. His farm grew to be one of the largest in Alberta by World War II, leveraging sustainable practices such as strip farming and becoming the first in Canada to use Caterpillar diesel tractors. Lassiter also gained provincial recognition as a campaign speaker for William Aberhart in the early 1930s.

In 1947, the Government of Alberta hired Lassiter to clear over 100,000 acres near Wanham and Eaglesham, to be used as farming plots by returning WWII veterans. The Lassiter Project's costs exceeded expectations, bankrupting Lassiter's company and resulting in less uptake by veterans than anticipated. Using dry farming techniques, Lassiter's agricultural operations in Chin recovered by 1951.

=== Recent development: 1970-present ===
Most residences in Chin were introduced during the 1940s and 1950s; as of 2020, few new homes in Chin date from a time after the 1960s. The hamlet subsequently developed into a suburb for farmers and workers serving existing agricultural operations in the area. Chin's last grain elevators, originally built by Alberta Pacific Grain and the Ellison Milling Company respectively, were demolished in 2008.

Lethbridge County conducted a growth study of the hamlets of Chin and Kipp in 2020. Later, in 2023, the county amended its bylaws to allow residents of Chin and other hamlets to keep a limited number of livestock on residential properties.

== Demographics ==
Population history of Chin
Year	Pop.	±%
1981	35	—
1986	22	−37.1%
1991	20	−9.1%
1996	23	+15.0%
2001	35	+52.2%
2006	45	+28.6%
2011	48	+6.7%
2016	62	+29.2%
2021	83	+33.9%
Source: Statistics Canada

In the 2021 Census of Population conducted by Statistics Canada, Chin had a population of 83 living in 21 of its 21 total private dwellings, a change of 33.9% from its 2016 population of 62. With a land area of 0.09 km^{2} (0.035 sq mi), it had a population density of 922.2/km^{2} (2,388.5/sq mi) in 2021.

As a designated place in the 2016 Census of Population conducted by Statistics Canada, Chin had a population of 62 living in 19 of its 19 total private dwellings, a change of 29.2% from its 2011 population of 48. With a land area of 0.08 km^{2} (0.031 sq mi), it had a population density of 775.0/km^{2} (2,007.2/sq mi) in 2016.

=== Religion ===
As of 2026, the Peace Valley Mennonite Church of Chin offers regular services. Sermons are delivered in Low German.

== Services ==
Chin receives potable water via a pipeline from Lethbridge. As of 2020, Chin does not receive municipal sewer services, and roads in the hamlet are unpaved with gravel surfaces.

== Economy ==
As of 2020, Chin's residents are primarily engaged in agriculture.

The Canadian Pacific Railway maintains freight services to Chin as of 2026. Utilizing the hamlet's rail connections, the J. R. Simplot Company opened a fertilizer distribution facility in Chin in 2015. This location's storage capacity was expanded in 2019.

McCain Foods, which operates a French fry processing plant in the area as of 2025, doubled the capacity of its Chin site in 2023. In 2024, McCain entered into an agreement with a renewable power developer to power its plant via wind and solar energy.

== See also ==
- List of communities in Alberta
- List of designated places in Alberta
- List of hamlets in Alberta
