= Twin Butte =

Hamlet in southern Alberta, Canada

- Hamlet
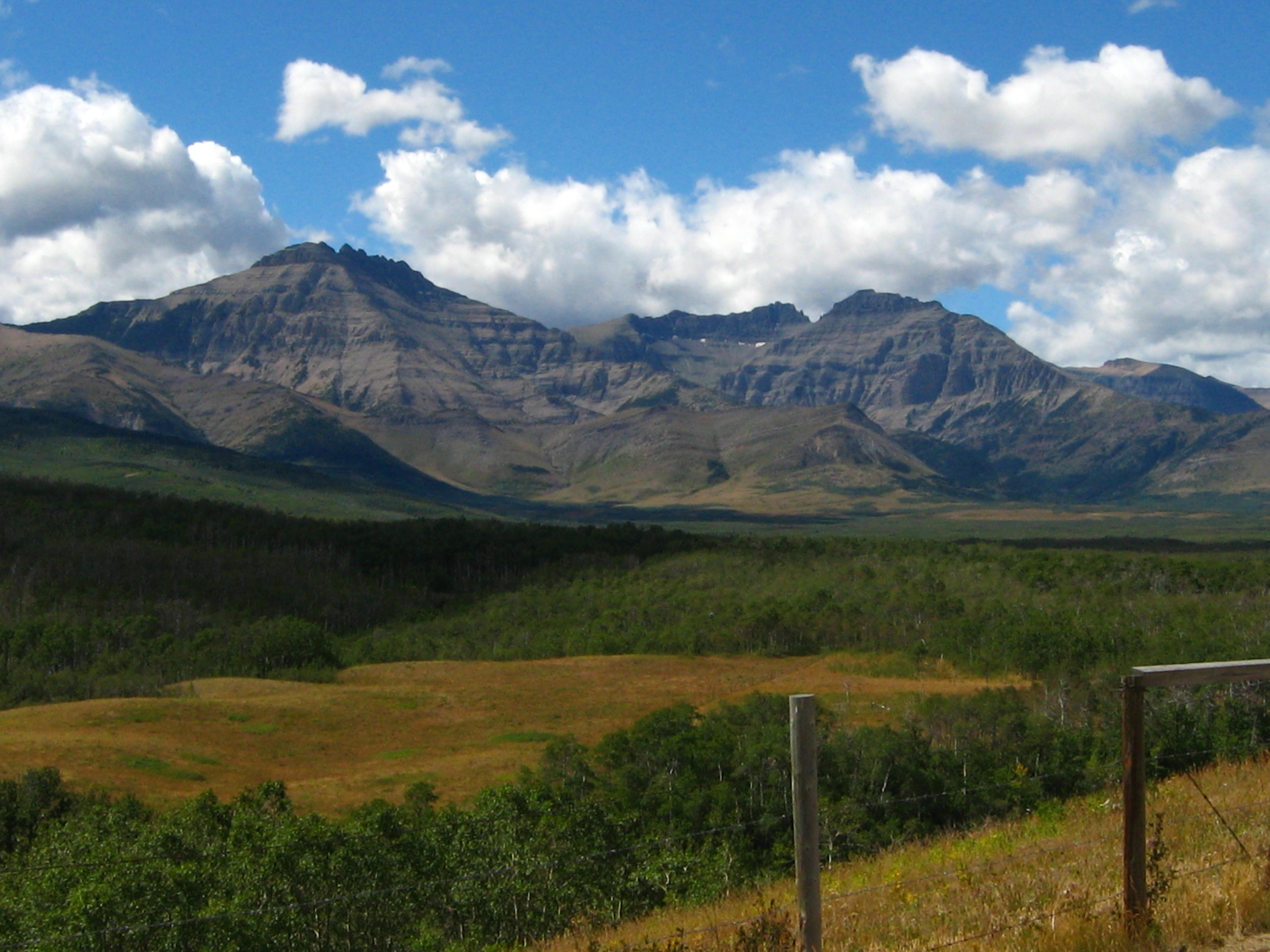
- Mount Dungarvan & Cloudy Ridge to the west of Twin Butte.

- Location of Twin Butte Twin Butte (Canada)
- Coordinates: 49°15′51″N 113°51′27″W
- Country: Canada
- Province: Alberta
- Region: Southern Alberta
- Census division: 3
- Municipal district: Municipal District of Pincher Creek No. 9

Government
  - Type: Unincorporated
  - Governing body: Municipal District of Pincher Creek No. 9 Council

Area (2021)
  - Land: 0.17 km^{2} (0.066 sq mi)

Population (2021)
  - Total: 10
  - Density: 59.9/km^{2} (155/sq mi)
- Time zone: UTC−06:00 (Alberta Time)
- Area codes: 403, 587, 825

Twin Butte is a hamlet in Southern Alberta, Canada within the Municipal District of Pincher Creek No. 9. It is located on Highway 6, approximately 88 kilometres (55 mi) southwest of Lethbridge. The hamlet of Twin Butte is historically known as a small ranching community located in the foothills of Alberta's Southwest region. The community has a general store, post office, Restaurant and a community hall along Highway 6 north of Township Road 40.

== History ==
Between 1885 and 1915, 43 ranching families settled the region. The community was given its name by Tillie Mitchell a prominent earlier pioneer to the area in the early 1900s. The name was given after two small hills, visible landmarks similar in shape and size overlooking the Yarrow Creek to the north of Mitchell's property, both noticeable to many travelers, traveling through the area.

The first post office in the area was the Yarrow Post Office, established on April 1, 1895, with Bob Christie as first Postmaster. It operated until closing in 1911. The Twin Butte Post Office was established on June 1, 1905, with Ed Mitchell Sr. as first Postmaster. The post office continues to operate over a century later, out of the Twin Butte General Store. A popular stopping point for travelers and tourists along The Cowboy Trail (Highway 6), between the town of Pincher Creek and Waterton Lakes National Park.

=== Education ===
In 1904 Ernest Hillier donated land 1 mile east of Twin Butte to build a schoolhouse. The Twin Butte School District No. 988 was then established, with classes first held September 1, 1904. The schoolhouse stood on the Southwest Quarter of Section 3, Township 4, Range 29, West of the 4th meridian. The school was used until consolidation of area schoolhouses in June 1958. Around 254 students attended school at Twin Butte. Today area children are bused to Pincher Creek for schooling.

== Demographics ==
Population history of Twin Butte
Year	Pop.	±%
1981	26	—
1986	13	−50.0%
1991	6	−53.8%
1996	16	+166.7%
2001	10	−37.5%
2006	10	+0.0%
2011	10	+0.0%
2016	10	+0.0%
2021	10	+0.0%
Source: Statistics Canada

In the 2021 Census of Population conducted by Statistics Canada, Twin Butte had a population of 10 living in 8 of its 9 total private dwellings, a change of 0% from its 2016 population of 10. With a land area of 0.17 km^{2} (0.066 sq mi), it had a population density of 58.8/km^{2} (152.4/sq mi) in 2021.

As a designated place in the 2016 Census of Population conducted by Statistics Canada, Twin Butte had a population of 10 living in 5 of its 6 total private dwellings, a change of 0% from its 2011 population of 10. With a land area of 0.17 km^{2} (0.066 sq mi), it had a population density of 58.8/km^{2} (152.4/sq mi) in 2016.

== See also ==
- List of communities in Alberta
- List of designated places in Alberta
- List of hamlets in Alberta
