= Peigan Timber Limit B =

Coordinates: 49°43′33″N 113°58′06″W

- Indian reserve
- Peigan Indian Reserve No. 147B
- Location in Alberta
- First Nation: Piikani
- Treaty: 7
- Country: Canada
- Province: Alberta
- Municipal district: Willow Creek

Area
  - Total: 2,978.6 ha (7,360 acres)
- Time zone: UTC−06:00 (Alberta Time)

Peigan Timber Limit 147B is an Indian reserve of the Piikani Nation in Alberta, located within the Municipal District of Willow Creek No. 26.
