= Pincher Station =

Pincher Station Pincher City
- Hamlet
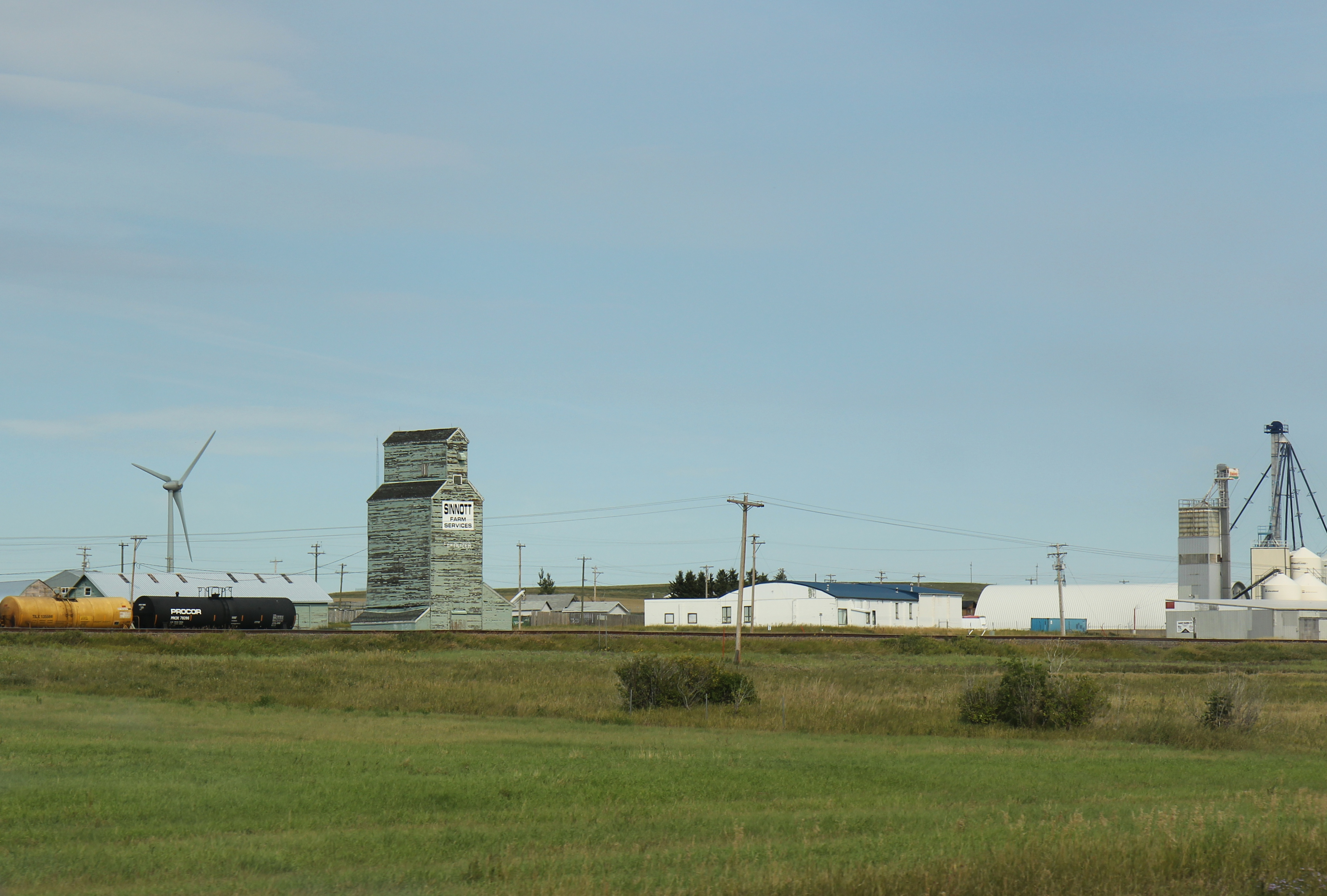
- Pincher Station from Alberta Highway 6

- Location of Pincher Station Pincher Station (Canada)
- Coordinates: 49°31′26″N 113°56′52″W
- Country: Canada
- Province: Alberta
- Region: Southern Alberta
- Census division: 3
- Municipal district: Municipal District of Pincher Creek No. 9

Government
  - Type: Unincorporated
  - Governing body: Municipal District of Pincher Creek No. 9 Council

Area (2021)
  - Land: 0.5 km^{2} (0.19 sq mi)

Population (2021)
  - Total: 26
  - Density: 64.4/km^{2} (167/sq mi)
- Time zone: UTC−06:00 (Alberta Time)
- Area codes: 403, 587, 825

Pincher Station, once known as Pincher City, is a hamlet in southern Alberta, Canada within the Municipal District of Pincher Creek No. 9. It is located on Highway 3, approximately 83 kilometres (52 mi) southwest of Lethbridge. Previously an incorporated community, Pincher City dissolved from village status on May 3, 1932.

== Demographics ==
Historical population
Year	Pop.	±%
1916	70	—
1921	60	−14.3%
1926	50	−16.7%
1931	53	+6.0%
2006	40	−24.5%
2011	25	−37.5%
2016	25	+0.0%
2021	26	+4.0%

In the 2021 Census of Population conducted by Statistics Canada, Pincher Station had a population of 26 living in 15 of its 21 total private dwellings, a change of 4% from its 2016 population of 25. With a land area of 0.5 km^{2} (0.19 sq mi), it had a population density of 52.0/km^{2} (134.7/sq mi) in 2021.

As a designated place in the 2016 Census of Population conducted by Statistics Canada, Pincher Station had a population of 25 living in 11 of its 12 total private dwellings, a change of 0% from its 2011 population of 25. With a land area of 0.4 km^{2} (0.15 sq mi), it had a population density of 62.5/km^{2} (161.9/sq mi) in 2016.

== See also ==
- List of communities in Alberta
- List of designated places in Alberta
- List of former urban municipalities in Alberta
- List of hamlets in Alberta
