= Valentine Milvain =

Canadian judge

James Valentine Hogarth Milvain
- Born: February 14, 1904; Near Lundbreck in the Livingstone District of the Northwest Territories
- Died: October 22, 1993 (aged 89)

James Valentine (Val) Hogarth Milvain, OC (February 14, 1904 – October 22, 1993) was a Canadian judge (Justice) in the province of Alberta.

Born near Lundbreck, in what was then the Northwest Territories, he received his LL.B. from the University of Alberta in 1926. In 1927, he was called to the Alberta Bar. He was created a King's Counsel in 1944.

In October 1959, Milvain, along with William George Morrow, William Stevenson, Herb Laycraft, and Ross MacKimmie represented the defendant in Ponoka-Calmar Oils v Wakefield, the last Canadian ruling rendered by the Judicial Committee of the Privy Council.

He was appointed judge of the Alberta Supreme Court in 1959 and Chief Justice in 1968. He retired at the mandatory age of 75 in 1979.

== Honours ==
- In 1979, he received an honorary doctorate of law degree from the University of Alberta.
- In 1982, an elementary school was built with his namesake in the Calgary community of Whitehorn.
- In 1987, he was made an Officer of the Order of Canada.
- In 1989, he received an honorary doctorate of law degree from the University of Lethbridge.
