= Lowland Heights =

- Hamlet
- Location of Lowland Heights Lowland Heights (Canada)
- Coordinates: 49°29′31″N 113°56′04″W
- Country: Canada
- Province: Alberta
- Region: Southern Alberta
- Census division: 3
- Municipal district: Municipal District of Pincher Creek No. 9

Government
  - Type: Unincorporated
  - Governing body: Municipal District of Pincher Creek No. 9 Council

Area (2021)
  - Land: 0.44 km^{2} (0.17 sq mi)

Population (2021)
  - Total: 43
  - Density: 97.8/km^{2} (253/sq mi)
- Time zone: UTC−06:00 (Alberta Time)
- Area codes: 403, 587, 825

Lowland Heights is a hamlet in southern Alberta, Canada within the Municipal District of Pincher Creek No. 9. It is located on Highway 6, approximately 83 kilometres (52 mi) southwest of Lethbridge.

== History ==
Lowland Heights is recognized for being a valuable point of transportation between Pincher Creek and Fort Macleod in the late 1800s.

== Demographics ==
Population history of Lowland Heights
Year	Pop.	±%
1986	45	—
1991	38	−15.6%
1991A	38	+0.0%
1996	63	+65.8%
1996A	47	−25.4%
2001	46	−2.1%
2006	45	−2.2%
2011	32	−28.9%
2016	43	+34.4%
2021	43	+0.0%
Source: Statistics Canada

In the 2021 Census of Population conducted by Statistics Canada, Lowland Heights had a population of 43 living in 20 of its 20 total private dwellings, a change of 0% from its 2016 population of 43. With a land area of 0.44 km^{2} (0.17 sq mi), it had a population density of 97.7/km^{2} (253.1/sq mi) in 2021.

As a designated place in the 2016 Census of Population conducted by Statistics Canada, Lowland Heights had a population of 43 living in 19 of its 19 total private dwellings, a change of 34.4% from its 2011 population of 32. With a land area of 0.37 km^{2} (0.14 sq mi), it had a population density of 116.2/km^{2} (301.0/sq mi) in 2016.

== See also ==
- List of communities in Alberta
- List of designated places in Alberta
- List of hamlets in Alberta
