= Piikani 147 =

Indian reserve of the Piikani in Alberta, Canada

Coordinates: 49°35′N 113°40′W

- Indian reserve
- Piikani Indian Reserve No. 147
- Boundaries of Piikani 147

- Location in Alberta
- First Nation: Piikani
- Treaty: 7
- Country: Canada
- Province: Alberta
- Community: Brocket

Area
  - Total: 42,699.2 ha (105,512 acres)

Population (2016)
  - Total: 1,544
  - Density: 3.616/km^{2} (9.365/sq mi)
- Time zone: UTC−06:00 (Alberta Time)

Piikani 147, formerly Peigan 147, is an Indian reserve of the Piikani Nation in Alberta. It is located 61 km (38 mi) west of the City of Lethbridge. It has a land area of 426.992 km^{2} (164.863 sq mi), making it the fourth-largest Indian reserve in Canada, and lies at an elevation of 1,046 m (3,432 ft). The Canada 2011 Census reported a population of 1,217 inhabitants. It is bordered by the Municipal District of Willow Creek No. 26 on its north and east, and by the Municipal District of Pincher Creek No. 9 on its west and south. The nearest outside communities are Fort Macleod and Pincher Creek.
