= Brocket, Alberta =

Settlement in Alberta, Canada

Coordinates: 49°32′49″N 113°45′2″W

Location of Brocket in Alberta

Brocket is a settlement in Peigan 147, in southern Alberta located on Highway 3 between Pincher Creek and Fort Macleod. It is the main community on the Piikani Nation reserve.

The community takes its name from Brocket Hall, in England.

In April 2010, the Buffalo Skull Lodge opened in Brocket housing Piikani Traditional Knowledge Services, which works to preserve Piikanissini, the traditional way of life of the Piikani people.

== See also ==
- Brocket 99
