= Barnwell, Alberta =

Barnwell
- Village
- Village of Barnwell
- Location within Alberta
- Coordinates: 49°45′37″N 112°15′45″W
- Country: Canada
- Province: Alberta
- Region: Southern Alberta
- Census division: 2
- Municipal district: Municipal District of Taber
- Incorporated
  - Village: January 1, 1980

Government
  - Mayor: Kent Bullock
  - Deputy Mayor: Deb Hansen
  - Governing body: Barnwell Village Council
  - MP: David Bexte
  - MLA: Grant Hunter

Area (2021)
  - Land: 1.5 km^{2} (0.58 sq mi)
- Elevation: 835 m (2,740 ft)

Population (2021)
  - Total: 978
  - Density: 651.4/km^{2} (1,687/sq mi)
- Time zone: UTC−06:00 (Alberta Time)
- Highways: Highway 3
- Website: www.barnwell.ca

Barnwell is a village in southern Alberta, Canada. It is located 10 km (6.2 mi) west of Taber and 43 km (27 mi) east of Lethbridge on Highway 3, in the Municipal District of Taber.

== History ==
In the late 19th century, a boxcar was located on a rail siding in what is now Barnwell. It was used as a telegraph office for local settlers and the railroad, and the area was named Woodpecker. In 1908, the area was renamed Bountiful to correspond to the local school district. A short while later, it was renamed to Barnwell because another community already had the name of Bountiful. The name Barnwell came from William Barnwell, a longtime employee of the Canadian Pacific Railway.

In the early 1900s migrating members of the Church of Jesus Christ of Latter-day Saints, colonized Barnwell as well as other Southern Alberta areas. "By 1911 Latter-day Saints had established eighteen new communities in southern Alberta, and 10,000 Saints, mostly farmers and their families, lived in the area of southwest Alberta alone."

== Demographics ==
Historical population
Year	Pop.	±%
1981	351	—
1986	402	+14.5%
1991	492	+22.4%
1996	552	+12.2%
2001	548	−0.7%
2006	613	+11.9%
2011	771	+25.8%
2016	947	+22.8%
2021	978	+3.3%

In the 2021 Census of Population conducted by Statistics Canada, the Village of Barnwell had a population of 978 living in 257 of its 264 total private dwellings, a change of 3.3% from its 2016 population of 947. With a land area of 1.5 km^{2} (0.58 sq mi), it had a population density of 652.0/km^{2} (1,688.7/sq mi) in 2021.

In the 2016 Census of Population conducted by Statistics Canada, the Village of Barnwell recorded a population of 947 living in 260 of its 266 total private dwellings, a 22.8% change from its 2011 population of 771. With a land area of 1.51 km^{2} (0.58 sq mi), it had a population density of 627.2/km^{2} (1,624.3/sq mi) in 2016.

The population of the Village of Barnwell according to its 2015 municipal census is 960, a 18.2% change from its 2011 municipal census population of 812.

== Notable residents ==
- Lawrence Peterson (1873-1951), was a member of the Legislative Assembly of Alberta from 1921 to 1930, representing the United Farmers Party. He served as the second Bishop of the Barnwell Ward of The Church of Jesus Christ of Latter-Day Saints from 1915 to 1925. He is one of the founders of Barnwell.

== See also ==
- List of communities in Alberta
- List of villages in Alberta
