= Burdett, Alberta =

Burdett
- Hamlet
- Location within Alberta Location within Canada
- Coordinates: 49°49′48.9″N 111°31′18.0″W
- Country: Canada
- Province: Alberta
- Region: Southern Alberta
- Census division: 1
- Municipal district: County of Forty Mile No. 8

Government
  - Governing body: County of Forty Mile No. 8
  - MP: Glen Motz
  - MLA: Grant Hunter

Area (2021)
  - Land: 0.69 km^{2} (0.27 sq mi)

Population (2021)
  - Total: 331
  - Density: 478.3/km^{2} (1,239/sq mi)
- Time zone: UTC−06:00 (Alberta Time)
- Postal code span: TOK 0J0
- Area code: +1-403
- Highways: Highway 3

Burdett is a hamlet in Alberta, Canada within the County of Forty Mile No. 8. It is located approximately 71 km (44 mi) west of Medicine Hat and 97 km (60 mi) east of Lethbridge on Highway 3. Also, Burdett is regarded as the site of Canada's first irrigation pivot.

== History ==
The community is named for Angela Burdett-Coutts, 1st Baroness Burdett-Coutts, a railroad promoter. Previously incorporated as a village on June 30, 1913, Burdett dissolved to hamlet status on January 1, 2003.

== Demographics ==
In the 2021 Census of Population conducted by Statistics Canada, Burdett had a population of 331 living in 105 of its 119 total private dwellings, a change of −17.5% from its 2016 population of 401. With a land area of 0.69 km^{2} (0.27 sq mi), it had a population density of 479.7/km^{2} (1,242.4/sq mi) in 2021.

As a designated place in the 2016 Census of Population conducted by Statistics Canada, Burdett had a population of 406 living in 117 of its 122 total private dwellings, a change of 17% from its 2011 population of 347. With a land area of 0.79 km^{2} (0.31 sq mi), it had a population density of 514/km^{2} in 2016.

== Notable people ==
- Harry Edwin Strom (July 7, 1914 – October 2, 1984) was a Canadian politician of Swedish descent, who served as Premier of Alberta between 1968 and 1971, and was born in Burdett.

== See also ==
- List of communities in Alberta
- List of former urban municipalities in Alberta
- List of hamlets in Alberta
