= Lundbreck =

- Hamlet
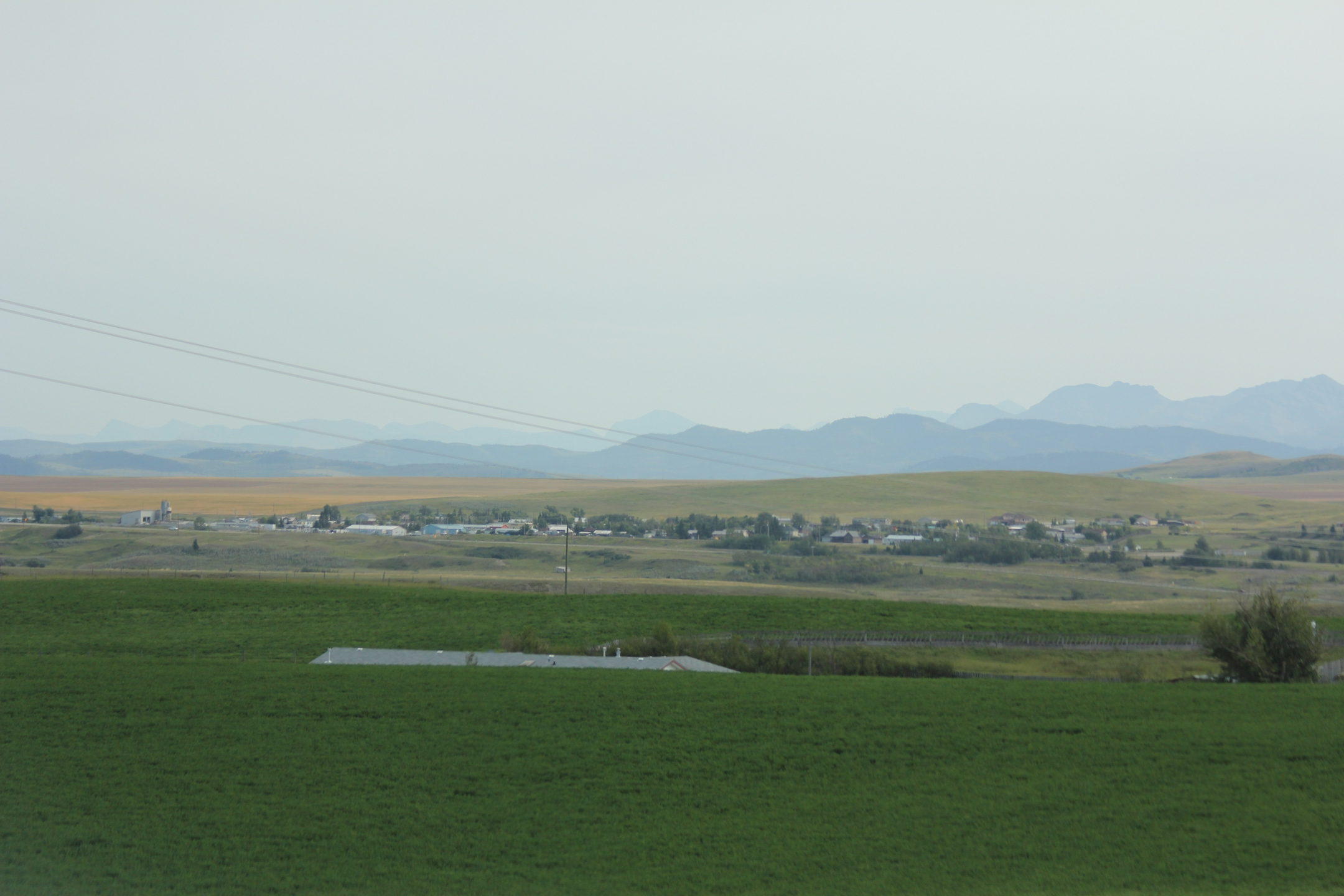
- Panorama of Lundbreck from Alberta Highway 22

- Location of Lundbreck in Alberta
- Coordinates: 49.5856°N 114.1619°W
- Country: Canada
- Province: Alberta
- Census division: No. 3
- Municipal district: Municipal District of Pincher Creek No. 9

Government
  - Type: Unincorporated
  - Governing body: Municipal District of Pincher Creek No. 9 Council

Area (2021)
  - Land: 0.42 km^{2} (0.16 sq mi)
- Elevation: 1,200 m (3,900 ft)

Population (2021)
  - Total: 289
  - Density: 690.4/km^{2} (1,788/sq mi)
- Time zone: UTC−06:00 (Alberta Time)

Lundbreck is a hamlet in southern Alberta, Canada within the Municipal District of Pincher Creek No. 9. It is located on the south side of Highway 3, approximately 3 kilometres (1.9 mi) east of the southern terminus of Highway 22, 16 km (9.9 mi) east of the Municipality of Crowsnest Pass, 4 km (2.5 mi) west of the Village of Cowley and 16 km (9.9 mi) west of the Town of Pincher Creek. It has an elevation of 1,200 m (3,900 ft).

It is part of Census Division No. 3 and the federal riding of Macleod.

== History ==
Lundbreck was incorporated in 1907, celebrated its centennial in 2007, and was named for two coal miners (Lund and Breckenridge).

Lundbreck had started out as a coal mining "town" in the 1880s, when it grew to a size of about 1,000 people. The coal mines closed by the early 1900s, at which time it quickly shrank. Other coal mines in the area were at Burmis, Alberta and Coleman.

Lundbrek is farm country, with some ranching, such as the Antelope Butte Ranch, the home of the Lynch-Staunton family. Frank C. Lynch-Staunton grew up to be a lieutenant-governor of Alberta.

== Demographics ==
In the 2021 Census of Population conducted by Statistics Canada, Lundbreck had a population of 289 living in 134 of its 145 total private dwellings, a change of 22.5% from its 2016 population of 236. With a land area of 0.42 km^{2} (0.16 sq mi), it had a population density of 688.1/km^{2} (1,782.2/sq mi) in 2021.

As a designated place in the 2016 Census of Population conducted by Statistics Canada, Lundbreck had a population of 236 living in 113 of its 141 total private dwellings, a change of −3.3% from its 2011 population of 244. With a land area of 0.42 km^{2} (0.16 sq mi), it had a population density of 561.9/km^{2} (1,455.3/sq mi) in 2016.

== Education ==
Livingstone School is a K-12, 1A school that was instituted in 1955, as a more modern alternative to the then practice of using several small, one room, multiple grade, rural schools. Kids were bussed in from the local area rural schools from Cowley and the northwest portion of the M.D. of Pincher Creek No. 9.

== See also ==
- List of communities in Alberta
- List of designated places in Alberta
- List of former urban municipalities in Alberta
- List of hamlets in Alberta

== Notable people ==
- Valentine Milvain
