= Kipp, Alberta =

Kipp
- Hamlet
- Location of Kipp in Alberta
- Coordinates: 49°45′30″N 112°57′26″W
- Country: Canada
- Province: Alberta
- Region: Southern Alberta
- Census division: 2
- Municipal district: Lethbridge County
- Time zone: UTC−06:00 (Alberta Time)
- Postal code span: T0K 2H0
- Area code: +1-403
- Highways: Highway 3

Kipp is a hamlet in Alberta, Canada that is under the jurisdiction of Lethbridge County. It is approximately 29 kilometres (18 mi) northwest of Lethbridge between Highway 3 and a Canadian Pacific Kansas City (CPKC) line.

Kipp originally began as a trading post called Fort Kipp, which was named after American whiskey trader Joe Kipp. Although not at the same location as the fort, Kipp takes its name from Fort Kipp.

== See also ==
- List of communities in Alberta
- List of hamlets in Alberta
