= Ardenville, Alberta =

Coordinates: 49.54999°N 113.45189°W

Ardenville is an unincorporated area in Alberta, Canada.

Ardenville has the name of Arden Simpson, a pioneer citizen.
