= Piikani Nation =

First Nations band in Canada

- Band No. 436
- Piikáni / ᑯᖾᖹ
- Flag of the Piigani (Peigan) First Nation
- People: Blackfoot
- Treaty: Treaty 7
- Headquarters: Brocket
- Province: Alberta

Land
- Main reserve: Piikani 147
- Reserve: Peigan Timber Limit B
- Land area: 456.778 km^{2} (176.363 sq mi)

Population (2019)
- On reserve: 2451
- Off reserve: 1466
- Total population: 3917

Government
- Chief: Troy Knowlton

Website
- https://piikanination.com/

The Piikani Nation (/piːˈkʌni/, formerly the Peigan Nation) (Blackfoot: ᑯᖾᖹ, romanized: Piikáni, Blackfoot pronunciation: [piːkʌ́ni]) is a First Nation (or an Indian band as defined by the Indian Act), representing the Indigenous people in Canada known as the Northern Piikani (Blackfoot: ᖳᑫᒪᓱᑯᖿᖹ, romanized: Aapátohsipikani, Blackfoot pronunciation: [aːpʌ́to̥xsipikʌni]) or simply the Peigan (Piikani or Pe'-e-ku-nee). The Peigan are now divided between the Blackfeet Nation (Aamsskáápipikani / ᖳᐢᔈᖿᑯᑯᖿᖹ or "Southern Piikani") based on the Blackfeet Indian Reservation in Montana, and the Piikani Nation (Aapátohsipikáni / ᖳᑫᒪᓱᑯᖿᖹ or "Northern Piikani") in Alberta. The other members of the Confederacy are the Blackfoot-speaking Káínaa / ᖿᖱᖻᖷ or Blood and the Siksiká / ᓱᖽᐧᖿ or Blackfoot, as well as the Tsuut'ina or Sarcee who only became allied later and spoke an unrelated language. At the time Treaty 7 was signed, the Northern Peigan were situated on the Oldman River, west of the future site of Lethbridge, to the west of the Kainai tribe.

== History ==
=== Early history and treaties ===
Historically speaking the Blackfoot language and members of the Blackfoot Confederacy (Niitsítapi / ᖹᒧᐧᒣᑯ), the Peigan people occupied territory before the 1870s on both sides of what is now the Canada–United States border.

The Blackfoot Confederacy signed several treaties with the US and received the Great Northern Reservation, an initially vast reservation in present-day Montana. However, 220 Peigans were massacred by the US Army in 1870 and American authorities pressured the Blackfoot to give up more and more lands to settlers (69,000 km^{2} or 17 million acres were ceded in 1887), leading some Peigans to relocate to Canada and sign Treaty 7 with the Canadian government in 1877.

=== Recent history ===
A court case in 2008 allowed for the principles of Piikanissini to be invoked to prevent a candidate from running from office, rather than to remove them once in office. The court found that the elders of the community functioned like a senate, and that they were the proper body to advise the Piikani Nation Election Removals Board and the Chief Electoral Officer. The court ruled that the Election Code did not include such powers for the elders as written, however, and so it gave the band six months to clarify the code.

The principles of Piikanissini were invoked once again when on December 13, 2013, Gayle Strikes With A Gun was removed as chief by the Piikani Nation Removal Appeals Board because she "failed to maintain a standard of conduct expected of a member of the Piikani Nation Council, as set out in the Election Bylaws and in keeping with the principles of Piikanissini."

==== Land, water rights, and finances ====
In 2002 the voters of Piikani Nation approved a $64.3 million settlement with the governments of Alberta and Canada over Piikani water rights impacted by the Lethbridge Northern Irrigation Headworks on the Oldman River. The monies were deposited in the Piikani Trust governed by the Piikani Trust Agreement. The agreement also allowed the Nation to acquire 10,300 acres (42 km^{2}) of new reserve land. The band later took out loans against the trust to invest in industrial developments, and were then sued by a band member alleging mismanagement. The band then filed suit against a Calgary-based investment broker for defrauding it of $23 million from the settlement. In 2012, the band's investment company, Piikani Investment Corporation, was restructured in the bankruptcy courts. The alleged mismanagement became part of a Royal Canadian Mounted Police investigation in 2013.

== Government ==
With its headquarters in Brocket, Alberta, the Piikani Nation controls two parcels of land, Peigan Timber Limit "B" and the Piikani 147 Indian reserve (on which Brocket is located). As of 2014 the band had a registered population of 3,638 members, of whom 2,358 lived on Piikani Nation reserves. The band is a member of the Treaty 7 Management Corporation and a signatory to the Buffalo Treaty.

The band is governed by a council comprising a chief and twelve councillors elected according to custom rather than the provisions of the Indian Act. To this end, in 2002, the Piikani Nation implemented the Piikani Nation Election By-law and Regulations (collectively referred to as the "Election Code"). This code includes a reference in its preamble to Piikanissini, the traditional teachings of the Piikani, and allows for councillors to be dismissed if they are found to violate the tenets of Piikanissini.

==== Education and cultural programs ====
The Piikani Nation has a history of firsts. It was the first band in Alberta to demand a vote in provincial elections, the first to allow liquor onto a reserve, the first to assume administration of their reserve, and the first to host Indian Day Celebrations as a means of retaining and maintaining their culture. Education has been controlled by the band since 1986 when a high school was built on the reserve. This is managed by the Peigan Board of Education, a non-profit society registered under the Societies Act of Alberta, comprising six trustees elected at large by the band's membership and one appointed by the band council. Scholarships and bursaries are provided by the Piikani Youth & Education Foundation with monies from the Piikani Trust Agreement (see below).
