= Island Lake (Alberta) =

Lake in Alberta, Canada

- Location within Alberta
- Location: Athabasca County, Alberta
- Coordinates: 54°50′47″N 113°31′55″W
- Basin countries: Canada
- Max. length: 6.2 km (3.9 mi)
- Max. width: 3.3 km (2.1 mi)
- Surface area: 7.81 km^{2} (3.02 sq mi)
- Average depth: 3.7 m (12 ft)
- Max. depth: 18 m (59 ft)
- Surface elevation: 600 m (2,000 ft)
- References: Island Lake

Island Lake is a lake located in Athabasca County, Alberta, Canada.

== Sources ==
- Lakewatch – Island Lake (PDF) (Report). The Alberta Lake Management Society. 2017.
