= Beaver Mines =

- Hamlet
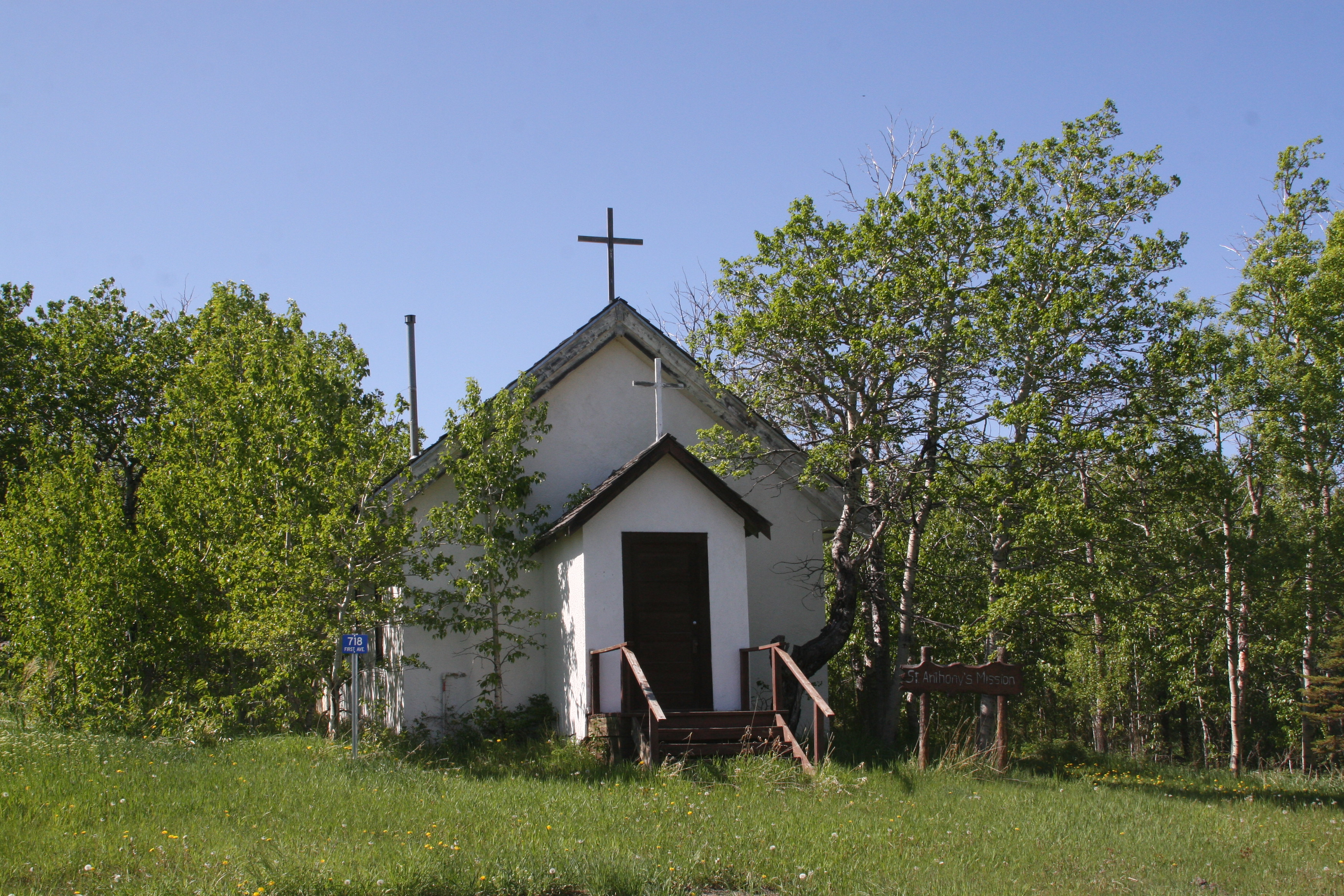

- Location of Beaver Mines in Alberta
- Coordinates: 49°27′24″N 114°11′50″W
- Country: Canada
- Province: Alberta
- Region: Southern Alberta
- Municipal district: Municipal District of Pincher Creek No. 9
- Census Division: No. 3

Government
  - Governing body: Municipal District of Pincher Creek No. 9

Area (2021)
  - Land: 0.66 km^{2} (0.25 sq mi)
- Elevation: 1,300 m (4,300 ft)

Population (2021)
  - Total: 85
  - Density: 129.3/km^{2} (335/sq mi)
- Time zone: UTC−06:00 (Alberta Time)
- Highways: 774, 507

Beaver Mines is a hamlet in southern Alberta, Canada within the Municipal District of Pincher Creek No. 9. It is located in the foothills of the Canadian Rockies on Highway 507, approximately 19 km (12 mi) west of Pincher Creek.

== History ==
The community was formed with the opening of a coal mine in the early 1900s. At one time Beaver Mines had over 1,500 residents. Because of the requirement for steel (rail tracks) during the wars and the reduction in the need for coal, the coal mines eventually closed and the community residents moved away. The last mine shut down its operations in 1971 and currently the mine site and many of the building foundations are on private land. For the past 30 years Beaver Mines has been considered a ghost town and has had numerous write-ups in ghost town books.

=== Contemporary issues ===
Currently, due largely to the expansion of Castle Mountain Resort and the growth of Calgary to the north, the hamlet has begun to grow again as a popular recreational destination.

== Climate ==
Beaver mines has a humid continental climate (Dfb) with mild to warm summers and cold, snowy winters with heavy snowfall for 8 months of the year. Late Spring and early Summer tends to be the wettest time of the year.

Climate data for Beaver Mines (1981-2010)
Month	Jan	Feb	Mar	Apr	May	Jun	Jul	Aug	Sep	Oct	Nov	Dec	Year
Record high °C (°F)	13.3 (55.9)	16.5 (61.7)	22 (72)	30.6 (87.1)	30 (86)	32.2 (90.0)	35.6 (96.1)	33.9 (93.0)	35 (95)	28.3 (82.9)	23.9 (75.0)	21.1 (70.0)	35.6 (96.1)
Mean daily maximum °C (°F)	0.2 (32.4)	1.2 (34.2)	4.8 (40.6)	10.1 (50.2)	15.1 (59.2)	18.9 (66.0)	23.3 (73.9)	23.0 (73.4)	17.5 (63.5)	11.1 (52.0)	3.1 (37.6)	−0.3 (31.5)	10.7 (51.3)
Daily mean °C (°F)	−4.7 (23.5)	−3.8 (25.2)	−0.5 (31.1)	4.4 (39.9)	8.9 (48.0)	12.7 (54.9)	16.0 (60.8)	15.4 (59.7)	10.8 (51.4)	5.7 (42.3)	−1.2 (29.8)	−4.6 (23.7)	4.9 (40.8)
Mean daily minimum °C (°F)	−9.5 (14.9)	−8.7 (16.3)	−5.7 (21.7)	−1.3 (29.7)	2.7 (36.9)	6.4 (43.5)	8.5 (47.3)	7.8 (46.0)	4.1 (39.4)	0.2 (32.4)	−5.4 (22.3)	−8.9 (16.0)	−0.8 (30.6)
Record low °C (°F)	−45.6 (−50.1)	−43.3 (−45.9)	−39.4 (−38.9)	−27.8 (−18.0)	−20.6 (−5.1)	−3.9 (25.0)	−3.5 (25.7)	−7 (19)	−11.7 (10.9)	−29.4 (−20.9)	−38.3 (−36.9)	−44.4 (−47.9)	−45.6 (−50.1)
Average precipitation mm (inches)	35.0 (1.38)	38.9 (1.53)	52.5 (2.07)	60.3 (2.37)	92.4 (3.64)	108.9 (4.29)	50.9 (2.00)	48.7 (1.92)	61.1 (2.41)	46.8 (1.84)	50.4 (1.98)	33.9 (1.33)	679.8 (26.76)
Average rainfall mm (inches)	4.4 (0.17)	3.2 (0.13)	4.5 (0.18)	17.2 (0.68)	74.2 (2.92)	107.4 (4.23)	50.9 (2.00)	47.2 (1.86)	54.7 (2.15)	19.6 (0.77)	11.9 (0.47)	4.0 (0.16)	399.2 (15.72)
Average snowfall cm (inches)	30.6 (12.0)	35.7 (14.1)	48.0 (18.9)	43.1 (17.0)	18.2 (7.2)	1.6 (0.6)	0.0 (0.0)	1.5 (0.6)	6.4 (2.5)	27.2 (10.7)	38.5 (15.2)	29.9 (11.8)	280.6 (110.5)
Average precipitation days (≥ 0.2 mm)	7.0	7.3	9.9	9.2	11.4	11.5	7.6	8.1	8.7	7.2	8.3	7.0	103.2
Average rainy days (≥ 0.2 mm)	1.6	0.9	2.4	4.7	10.3	11.5	7.6	8.0	8.3	4.7	2.9	1.1	63.9
Average snowy days (≥ 0.2 cm)	5.7	6.6	8.0	5.6	2.2	0.0	0.0	0.1	1.2	3.7	6.1	6.2	45.4

== Demographics ==
Population history of Beaver Mines
Year	Pop.	±%
1981	30	—
1986	47	+56.7%
1991	54	+14.9%
1996	60	+11.1%
2001	65	+8.3%
2006	71	+9.2%
2011	80	+12.7%
2016	82	+2.5%
2021	85	+3.7%
Source: Statistics Canada

In the 2021 Census of Population conducted by Statistics Canada, Beaver Mines had a population of 85 living in 43 of its 64 total private dwellings, a change of 3.7% from its 2016 population of 82. With a land area of 0.66 km^{2} (0.25 sq mi), it had a population density of 128.8/km^{2} (333.6/sq mi) in 2021.

As a designated place in the 2016 Census of Population conducted by Statistics Canada, Beaver Mines had a population of 82 living in 36 of its 59 total private dwellings, a change of 2.5% from its 2011 population of 80. With a land area of 0.66 km^{2} (0.25 sq mi), it had a population density of 124.2/km^{2} (321.8/sq mi) in 2016.

== See also ==
- List of communities in Alberta
- List of designated places in Alberta
- List of hamlets in Alberta
