= Cowley, Alberta =

Municipality in Alberta, Canada (est. 1906)

Cowley
- Village
- Village of Cowley
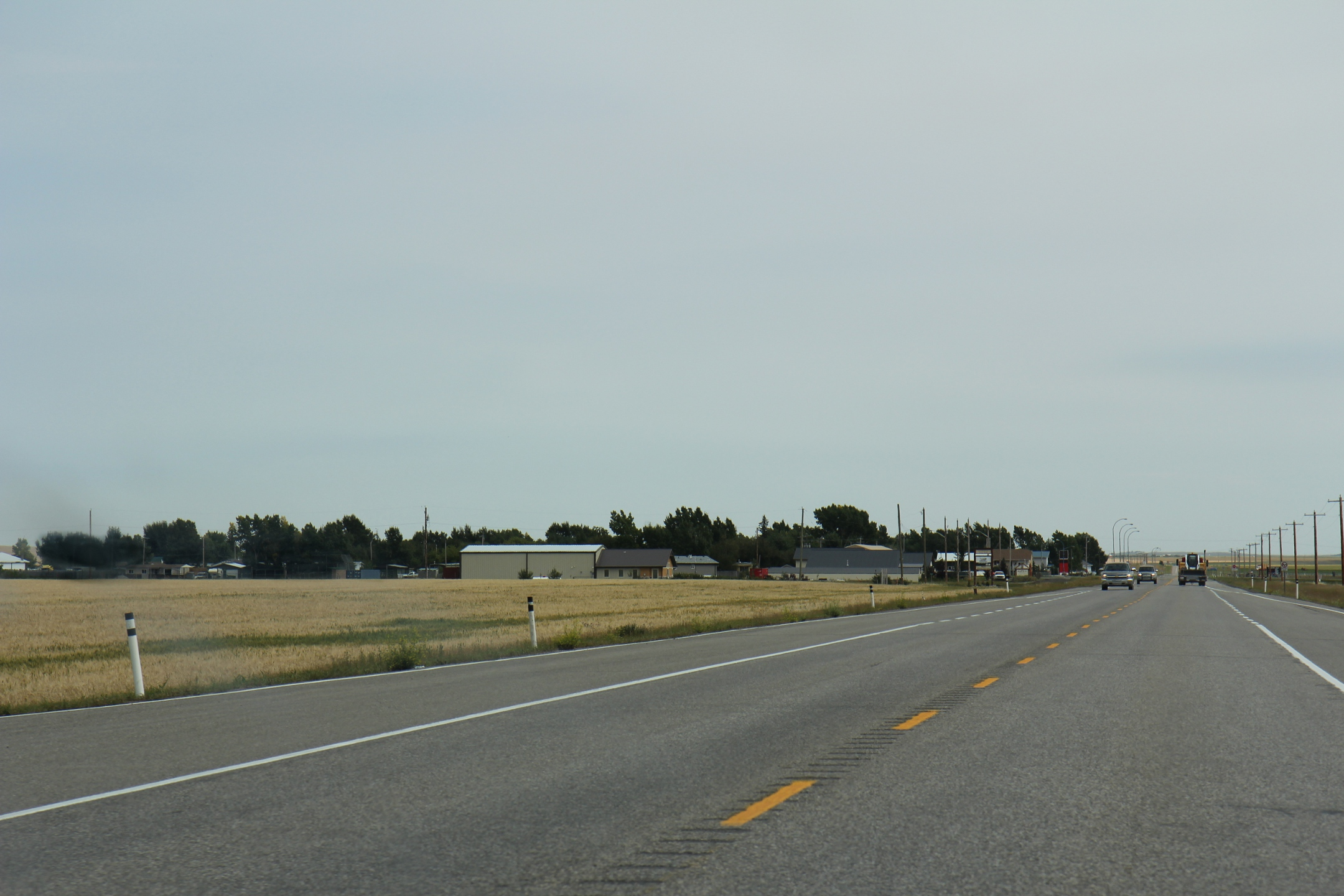
- Looking east at Cowley on AB3 (Crowsnest Highway)

- Location of Cowley in Alberta
- Coordinates: 49°34′03.7″N 114°04′08.7″W
- Country: Canada
- Province: Alberta
- Region: Southern Alberta
- Census division: 3
- Municipal district: Municipal District of Pincher Creek No. 9
- Incorporated
  - Village: August 16, 1906

Government
  - Mayor: Garry Hackler (Deputy)
  - Governing body: Cowley Village Council

Area (2021)
  - Land: 1.36 km^{2} (0.53 sq mi)
- Elevation: 1,175 m (3,855 ft)

Population (2021)
  - Total: 216
  - Density: 159.2/km^{2} (412/sq mi)
- Time zone: UTC−06:00 (Alberta Time)
- Area codes: +1-403, +1-587
- Highways: Highway 3 Highway 510
- Waterway: Oldman River Reservoir
- Website: cowley.ca

Cowley is a village in southern Alberta, Canada. It is west of Lethbridge and surrounded by the Municipal District of Pincher Creek No. 9.

It was settled in the 1880s and named by a rancher. Cowley Post Office opened in 1900, and in 1906 Cowley was incorporated as village. The community's name is a combination of "cow" and "lea".

== Demographics ==
In the 2021 Census of Population conducted by Statistics Canada, the Village of Cowley had a population of 216 living in 96 of its 110 total private dwellings, a change of 3.3% from its 2016 population of 209. With a land area of 1.36 km^{2} (0.53 sq mi), it had a population density of 158.8/km^{2} (411.4/sq mi) in 2021.

In the 2016 Census of Population conducted by Statistics Canada, the Village of Cowley recorded a population of 209 living in 100 of its 113 total private dwellings, a change of −11.4% from its 2011 population of 236. With a land area of 1.37 km^{2} (0.53 sq mi), it had a population density of 152.6/km^{2} (395.1/sq mi) in 2016.

== Arts and culture ==
Cowley was featured in the 2005 motion picture Brokeback Mountain as the fictional town of Signal, Wyoming.

Cowley is featured on a 17c postage stamp issued by Canada Post in 1980 (August 27) to mark the 75th anniversary of the creation of the Province of Alberta.

== See also ==
- List of communities in Alberta
- List of villages in Alberta
