= Burmis, Alberta =

Burmis
- Unincorporated community
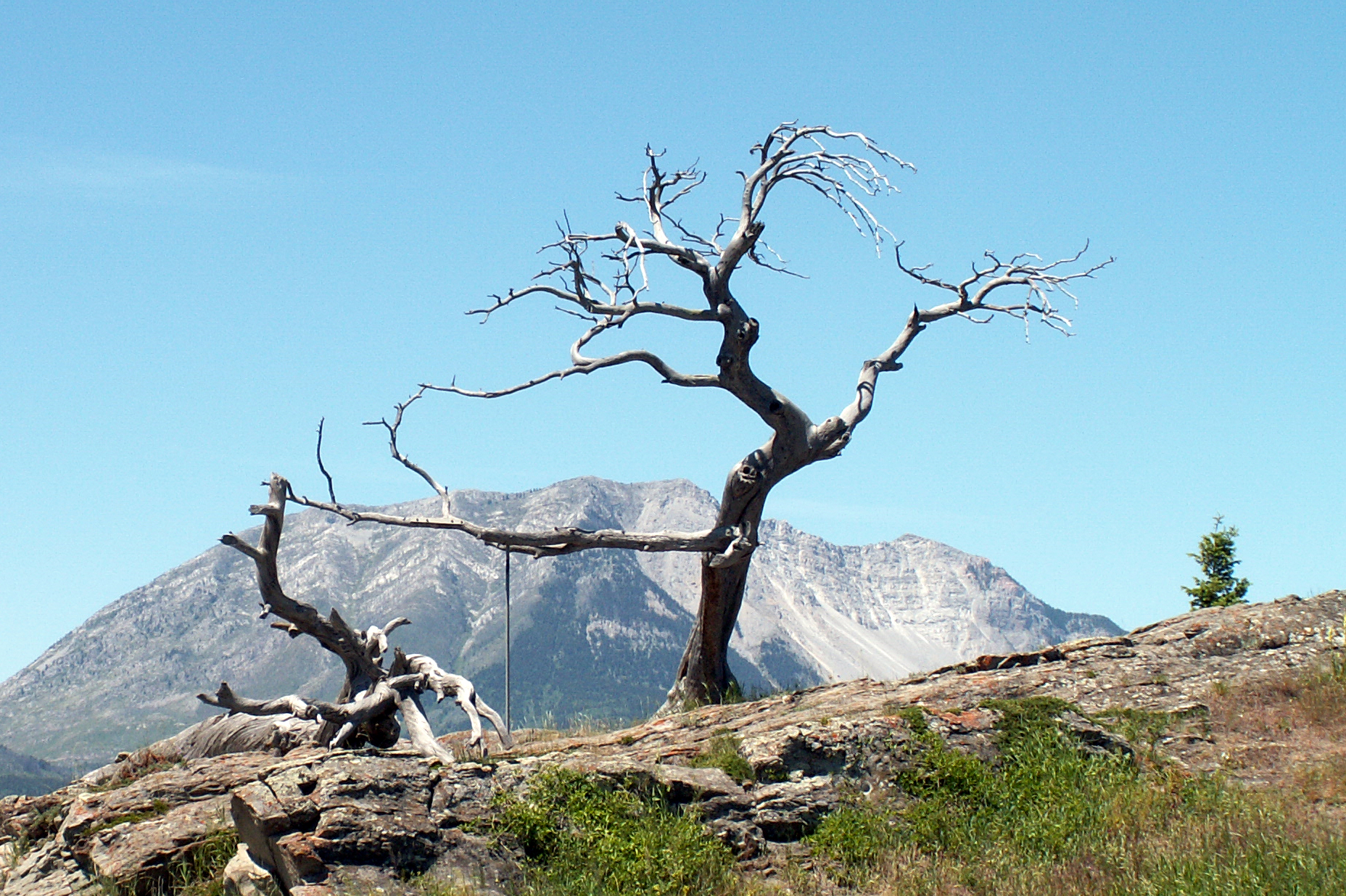
- Burmis Tree

- Location within Alberta Location within Canada Location within North America
- Coordinates: 49.5572°N 114.2878°W
- Country: Canada
- Province: Alberta
- Region: Southern Alberta
- Census division: No. 3
- Municipal district: Pincher Creek No. 9

Burmis is an unincorporated community in southern Alberta in the Municipal District of Pincher Creek No. 9, located on Highway 3, 107 kilometres (66 mi) southwest of Lethbridge. Its post office opened in 1915 and closed in 1968. The name "Burmis" is a portmanteau of Burns and Kemmis, the names of two pioneer citizens.
