= Municipal District of Pincher Creek No. 9 =

Municipal district in Alberta, Canada

- Municipal district

- Location within Alberta
- Country: Canada
- Province: Alberta
- Region: Southern Alberta
- Census division: 3
- Established: 1944
- Incorporated: 1945

Government
  - Reeve: Rick Lemire
  - Governing body: MD of Pincher Creek Council
  - Administrative office: Pincher Creek

Area (2021)
  - Land: 3,455.75 km^{2} (1,334.27 sq mi)

Population (2021)
  - Total: 3,240
  - Density: 0.9/km^{2} (2.3/sq mi)
- Time zone: UTC−06:00 (Alberta Time)
- Website: mdpinchercreek.ab.ca

The Municipal District of Pincher Creek No. 9 is a municipal district (MD) in southwestern Alberta, Canada. Located in Census Division No. 3, its municipal office is located in the Town of Pincher Creek.

== History ==
The MD of Pincher Creek No. 9 was originally renamed from the MD of Crowsnest No. 39 to the MD of Pincher Creek No. 39 in 1944. It was renumbered a year later in 1945.

== Geography ==
=== Communities and localities ===
The following urban municipalities are surrounded by the MD of Pincher Creek No. 9.

Cities

- none

Towns

- Pincher Creek

Villages

- Cowley

Summer villages

- none

The following hamlets are located within the MD of Pincher Creek No. 9.

Hamlets

- Beaver Mines
- Lowland Heights
- Lundbreck
- Pincher Station
- Twin Butte

The following localities are located within the MD of Pincher Creek No. 9.

Localities

- Burmis
- Chapel Rock
- Drywood
- Improvement District No. 40
- Maycroft
- North Fork
- Pecten
- Springridge
- Summerview
- Tod Creek

== Demographics ==
In the 2021 Census of Population conducted by Statistics Canada, the MD of Pincher Creek No. 9 had a population of 3,240 living in 1,288 of its 1,801 total private dwellings, a change of 9.3% from its 2016 population of 2,965. With a land area of 3,455.75 km^{2} (1,334.27 sq mi), it had a population density of 0.9/km^{2} (2.4/sq mi) in 2021.

In the 2016 Census of Population conducted by Statistics Canada, the MD of Pincher Creek No. 9 had a population of 2,965 living in 1,119 of its 1,640 total private dwellings, a −6.1% change from its 2011 population of 3,158. With a land area of 3,482.05 km^{2} (1,344.43 sq mi), it had a population density of 0.9/km^{2} (2.2/sq mi) in 2016.

== See also ==
- List of communities in Alberta
- List of municipal districts in Alberta
