= Campbell Mountain =

Mountain in Montana, United States

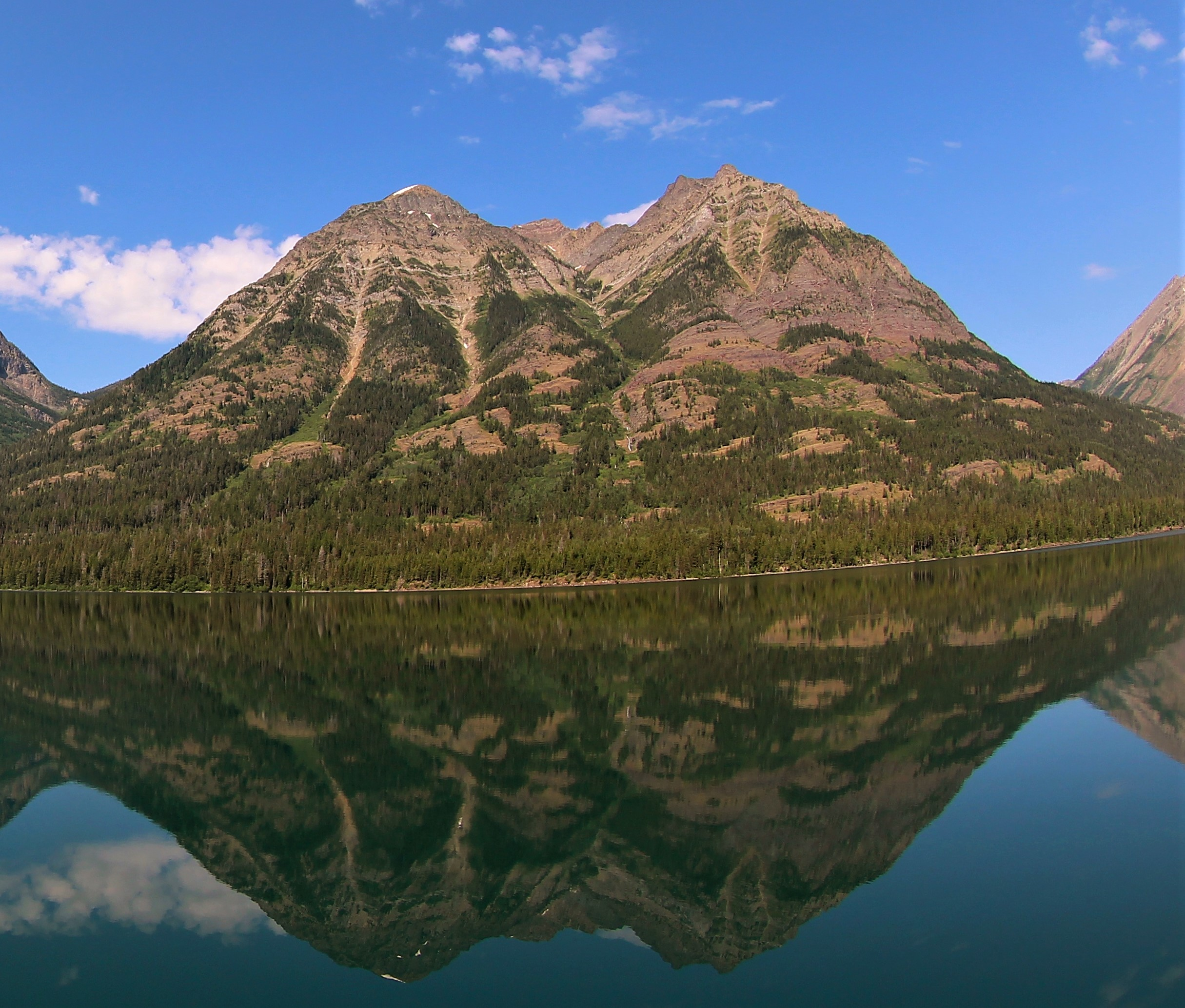
- Campbell Mountain reflected in Waterton Lake

Highest point
- Elevation: 8,249 ft (2,514 m) NAVD 88
- Prominence: 1,125 ft (343 m)
- Coordinates: 48°58′41″N 113°56′19″W

Geography
- Location within Montana Location within the United States
- Location: Glacier County, Montana, U.S.
- Parent range: Livingston Range
- Topo map(s): USGS Porcupine Ridge, MT

Campbell Mountain (8,249 feet (2,514 m)) is located in the Livingston Range, Glacier National Park in the U.S. state of Montana. Campbell Mountain rises more than 4,000 feet (1,200 m) above the west shore of Waterton Lake. The mountain is named after Archibald Campbell, who played a role in mapping the international border.

== Climate ==
Based on the Köppen climate classification, it is located in an alpine subarctic climate zone with long, cold, snowy winters, and cool to warm summers. Temperatures can drop below −10 °F with wind chill factors below −30 °F.

== Geology ==
Like other mountains in Glacier National Park, it is composed of sedimentary rock laid down during the Precambrian to Jurassic periods. Formed in shallow seas, this sedimentary rock was initially uplifted beginning 170 million years ago when the Lewis Overthrust fault pushed an enormous slab of precambrian rocks 3 mi (4.8 km) thick, 50 miles (80 km) wide and 160 miles (260 km) long over younger rock of the cretaceous period.

Surroundings: Citadel Peaks on the left. Olson Mountain in the center.

== See also ==
- List of mountains and mountain ranges of Glacier National Park (U.S.)
