= Porcupine Ridge =

Mountain ridge in Montana, US

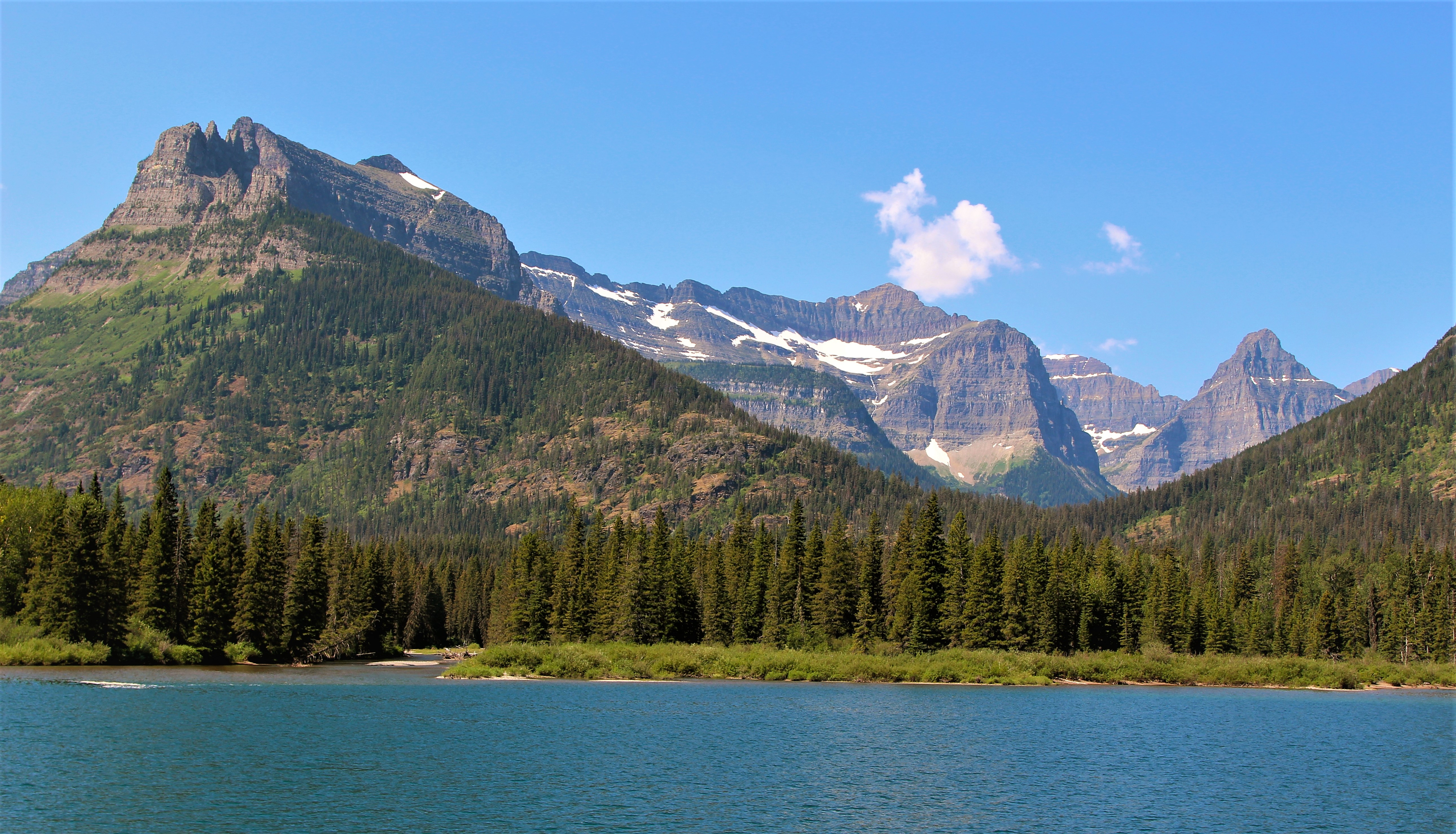
- Porcupine Ridge centered (cloud over the summit), with Citadel Peaks (left).

Highest point
- Elevation: 9,128 ft (2,782 m)
- Prominence: 1,688 ft (515 m)
- Parent peak: The Guardhouse (9,341 feet)
- Isolation: 1.57 mi (2.53 km)
- Coordinates: 48°55′12″N 113°59′00″W

Geography
- Location within Montana Location within the United States
- Country: United States
- State: Montana
- County: Glacier
- Protected area: Glacier National Park
- Parent range: Livingston Range; Rocky Mountains
- Topo map: USGS Porcupine Ridge

Geology
- Rock age: Precambrian
- Rock type: Sedimentary rock

Porcupine Ridge is a prominent mountain ridge located in the Goat Haunt area of Glacier National Park, in Glacier County of the U.S. state of Montana. This mountain is part of the Livingston Range, and is situated 1.5 mile east of the Continental Divide. Topographic relief is significant as the summit rises approximately 3,900 feet (1,200 meters) above Lake Frances in one mile, and nearly 5,000 feet (1,500 meters) above Waterton Lake in five miles. Precipitation runoff from the mountain drains to the Waterton River via Olson and Valentine Creeks. This geographical feature's name was officially adopted in 1911 by the United States Board on Geographic Names.

== Climate ==
Based on the Köppen climate classification, Porcupine Ridge is located in an alpine subarctic climate zone characterized by long, usually very cold winters, and short, cool to mild summers. Winter temperatures can drop below −10 °F with wind chill factors below −20 °F. This climate supports the remnant of an unnamed glacier on the northeast aspect below the summit.

== Geology ==
Like the mountains in Glacier National Park, Porcupine Ridge is composed of sedimentary rock laid down during the Precambrian to Jurassic periods. Formed in shallow seas, this sedimentary rock was initially uplifted beginning 170 million years ago when the Lewis Overthrust fault pushed an enormous slab of precambrian rocks 3 mi (4.8 km) thick, 50 miles (80 km) wide and 160 miles (260 km) long over younger rock of the cretaceous period.

== Gallery ==
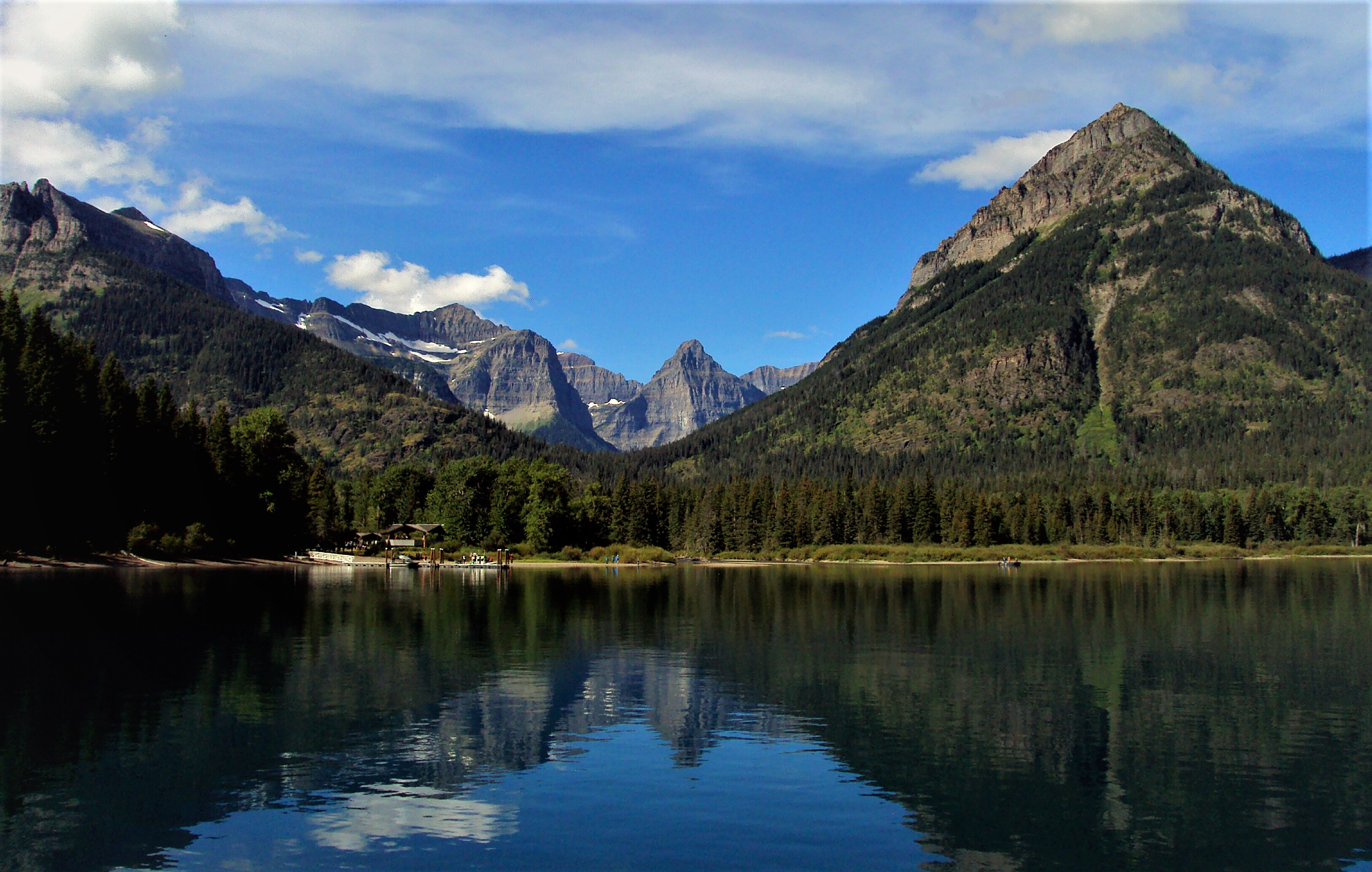
Porcupine Ridge left of center, Olson Mountain to right.

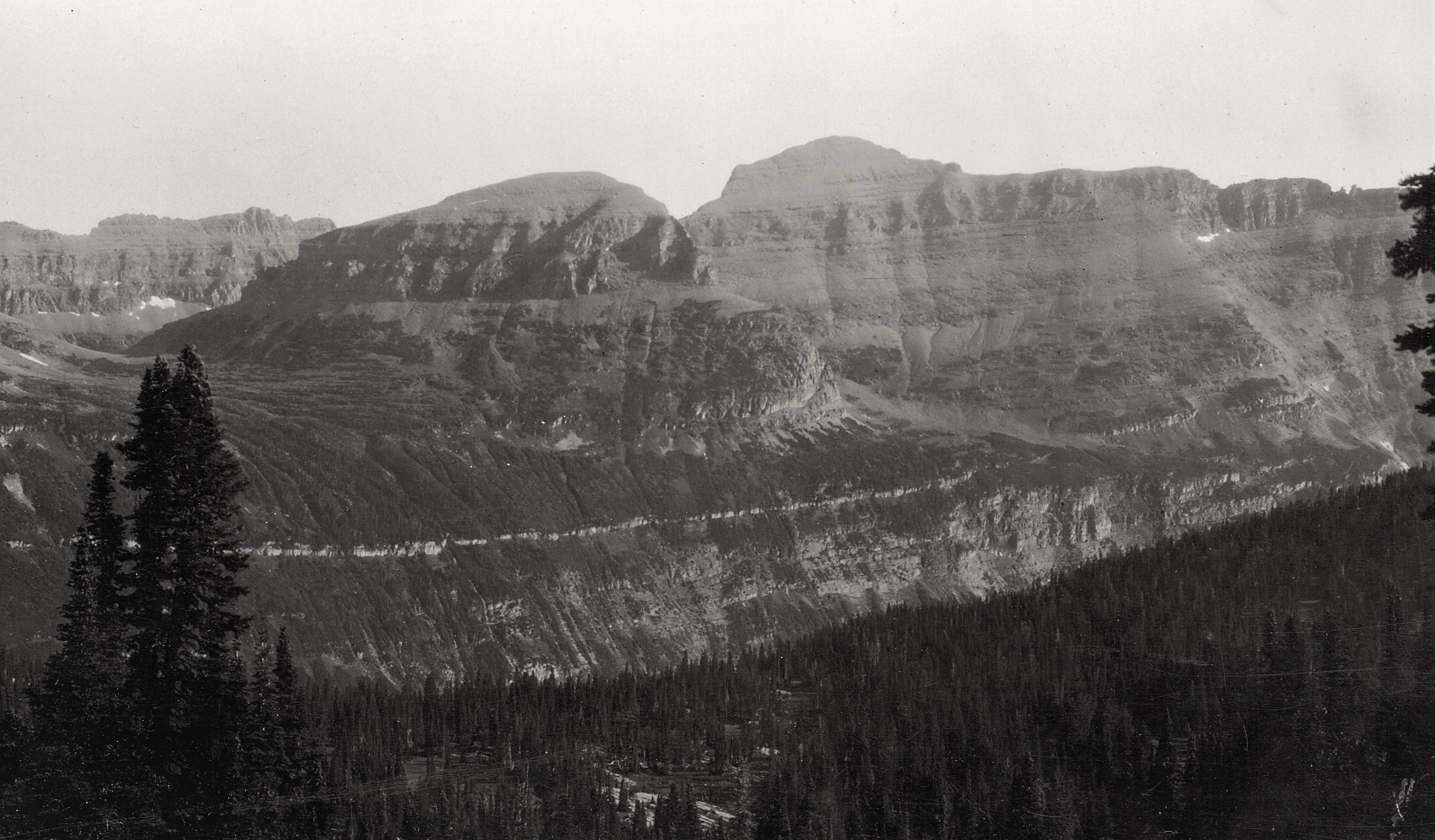
South aspect, circa 1913.

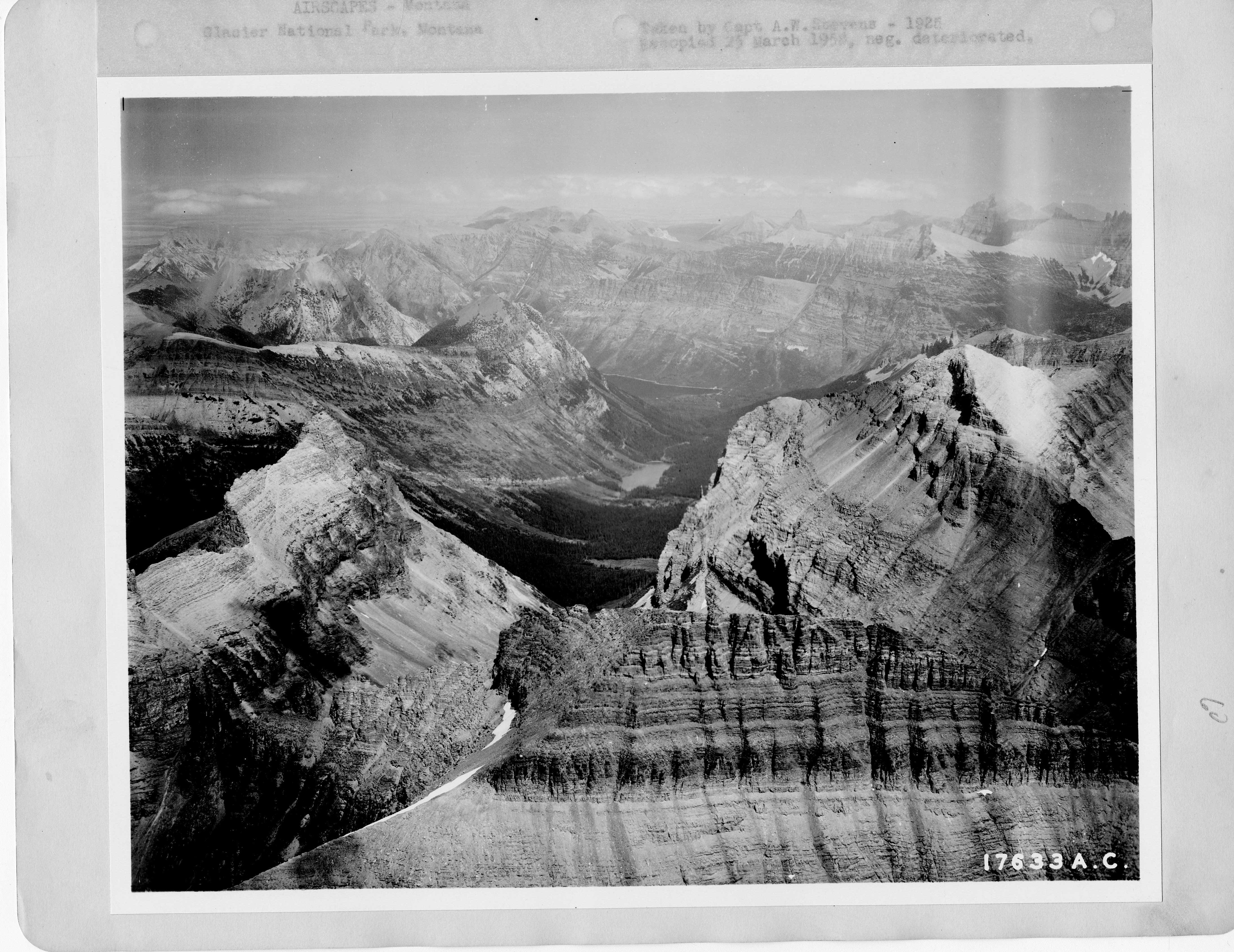
Porcupine Ridge to right, aerial view circa 1925.

== See also ==
- List of mountains and mountain ranges of Glacier National Park (U.S.)
- Geology of the Rocky Mountains
