= Citadel Peaks =

Mountain in the state of Montana

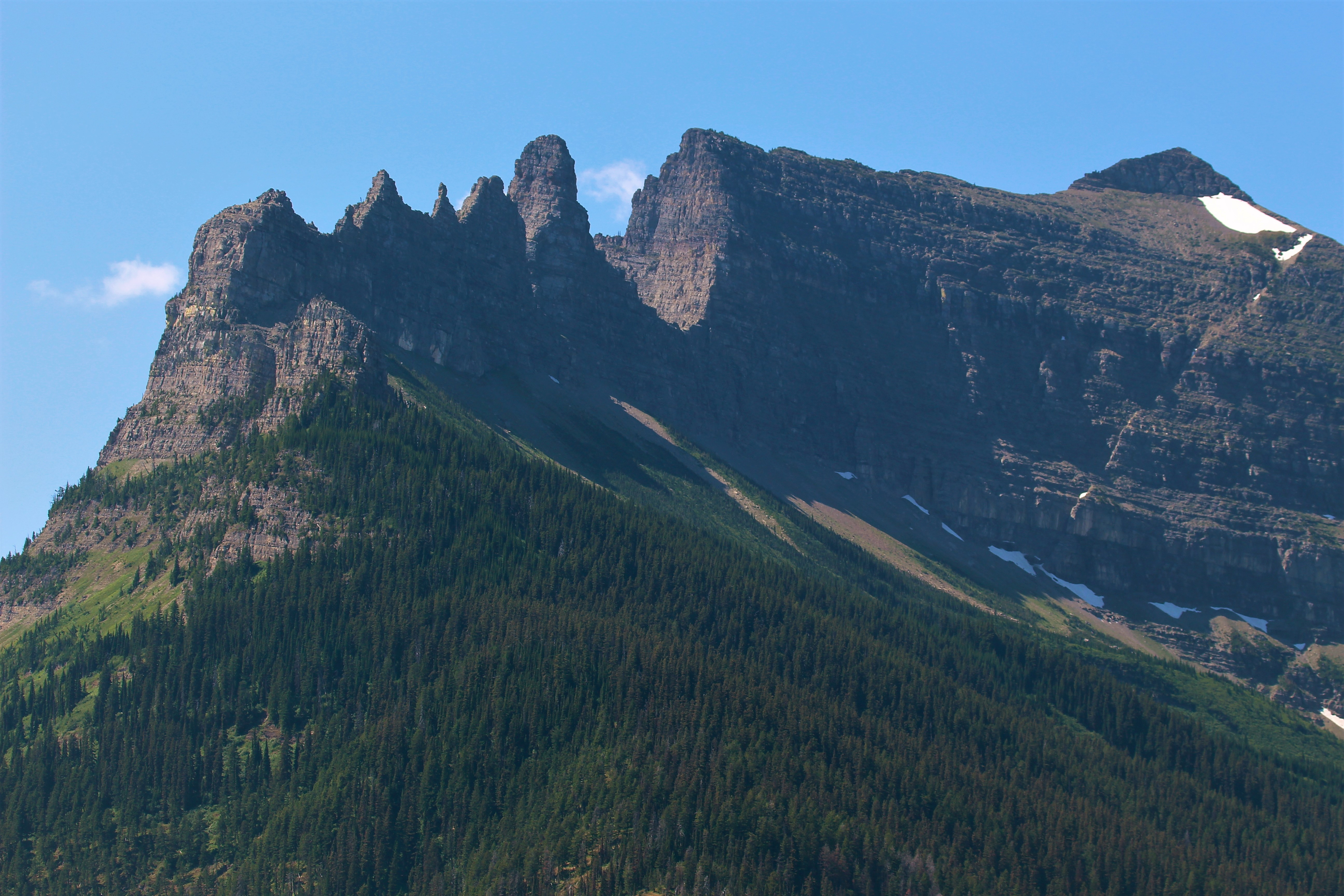
- North aspect

Highest point
- Elevation: 8,040 ft (2,450 m)
- Prominence: 240 ft (73 m)
- Parent peak: Porcupine Ridge (9,128 ft)
- Isolation: 0.46 mi (0.74 km)
- Coordinates: 48°55′44″N 113°56′05″W

Naming
- Etymology: Citadel (descriptive)

Geography
- Location within Montana Location within the United States
- Location: Glacier National Park; Glacier County, Montana, U.S.
- Parent range: Livingston Range; Rocky Mountains
- Topo map: USGS Porcupine Ridge

Geology
- Rock age: Precambrian
- Mountain type: Arête
- Rock type: Sedimentary rock

Citadel Peaks is a mountain ridge located in the Goat Haunt area of Glacier National Park, in Glacier County of the U.S. state of Montana. This arête with a row of sharp points is part of the Livingston Range, and is approximately four miles east of the Continental Divide. Neighbors include Olson Mountain, two miles (3.2 km) to the north, Mount Cleveland four miles (6.4 km) to the east, and Kootenai Peak 2.7 miles (4.3 km) to the south. Topographic relief is significant as Citadel Peaks rises over 3,800 feet (1,200 meters) above Waterton Lake in less than two miles, and 3,000 feet (910 meters) above Lake Janet in one mile. Precipitation runoff from the mountain drains to the south end of Waterton Lake. The first ascent of Citadel Spire, a major pinnacle on the ridge, was made in 1967 by Jerry Kanzler, Jim Kanzler, Ray Martin, and Clare Pogreba. This geographical feature's name was officially adopted in 1929 by the United States Board on Geographic Names. To the Pikuni people, Citadel Peaks is known as "Ataniawxis", meaning "The Needles".

== Climate ==
Based on the Köppen climate classification, Citadel Peaks is located in an alpine subarctic climate zone characterized by long, usually very cold winters, and short, cool to mild summers. Temperatures can drop below −10 °F with wind chill factors below −30 °F.

== Geology ==
Like the mountains in Glacier National Park, Citadel Peaks is composed of sedimentary rock laid down during the Precambrian to Jurassic periods. Formed in shallow seas, this sedimentary rock was initially uplifted beginning 170 million years ago when the Lewis Overthrust fault pushed an enormous slab of precambrian rocks 3 mi (4.8 km) thick, 50 miles (80 km) wide and 160 miles (260 km) long over younger rock of the cretaceous period.

== Gallery ==
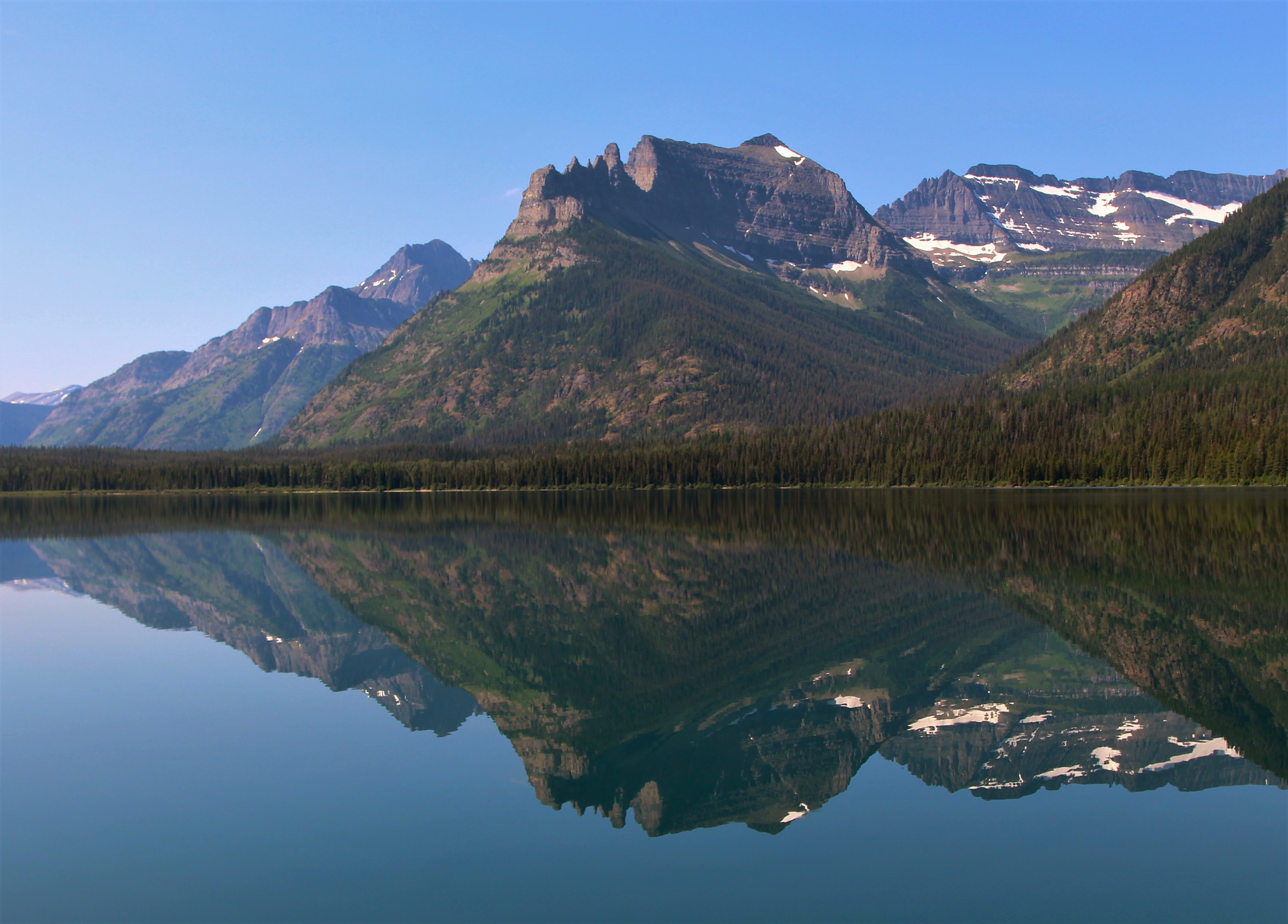
Citadel Peaks reflected in Waterton Lake.
Kootenai Peak (left), Porcupine Ridge (right).

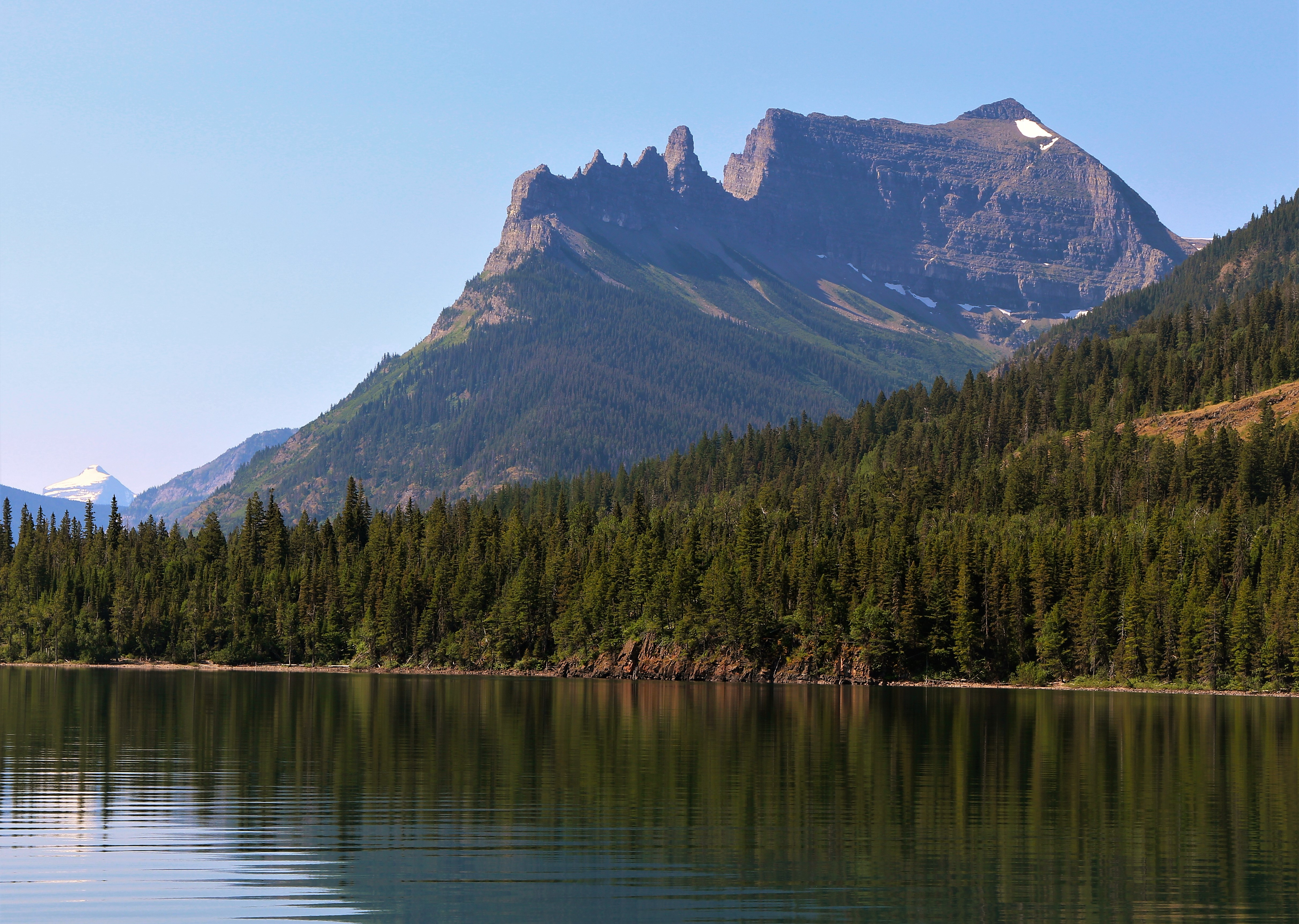
Citadel Peaks above the south end of Waterton Lake

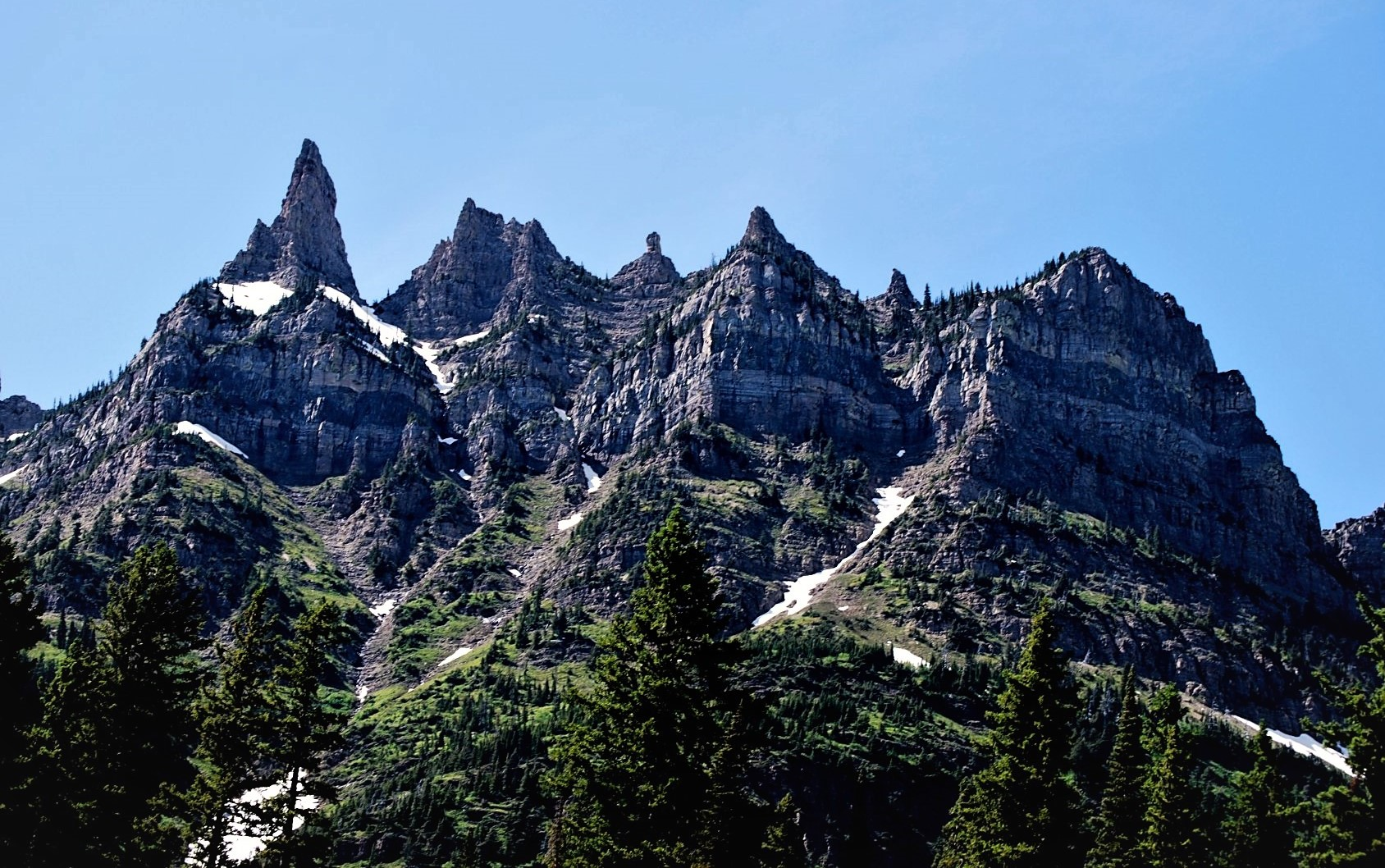
Southeast aspect

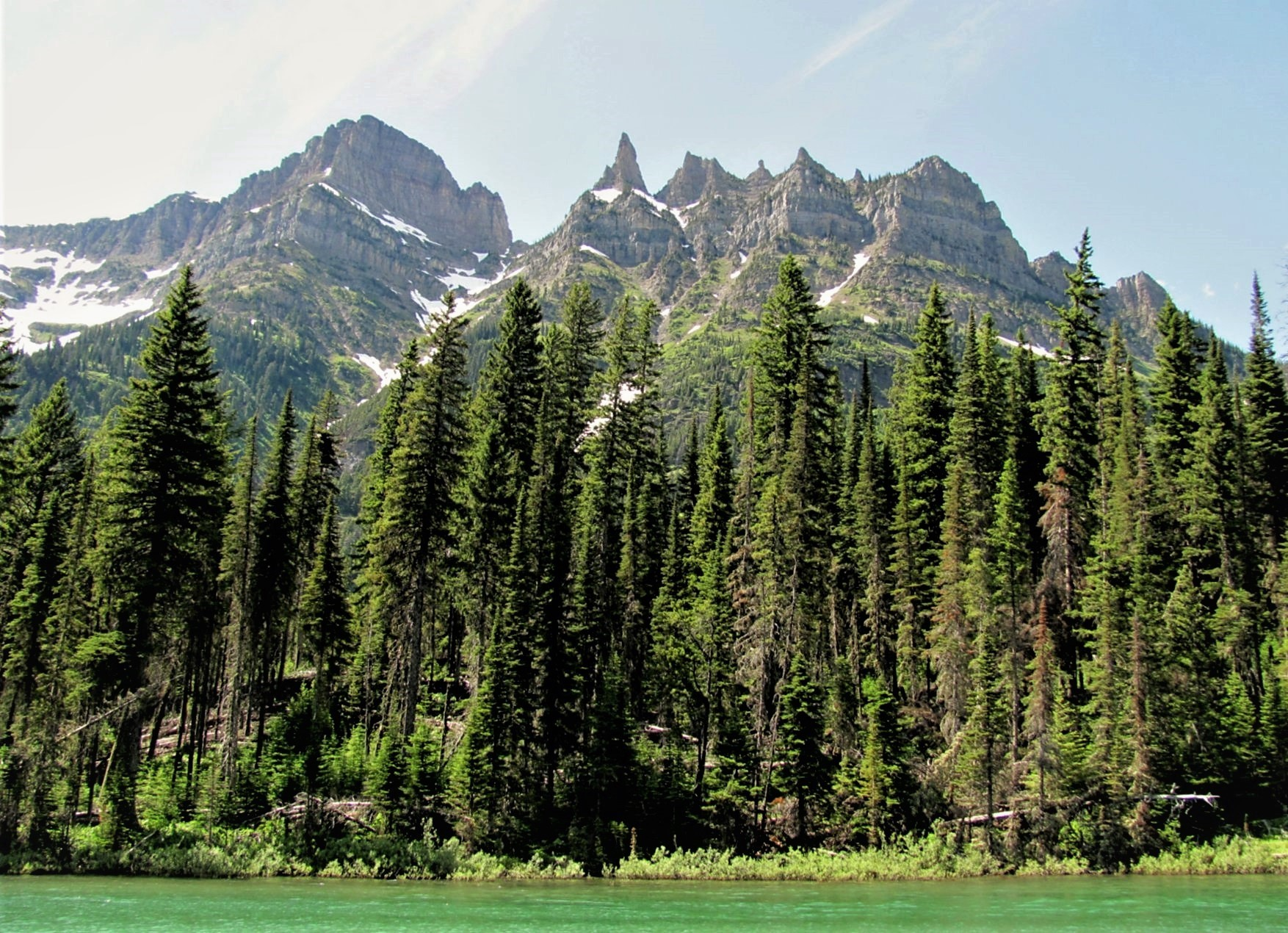
Southeast aspect from Kootenai Lakes

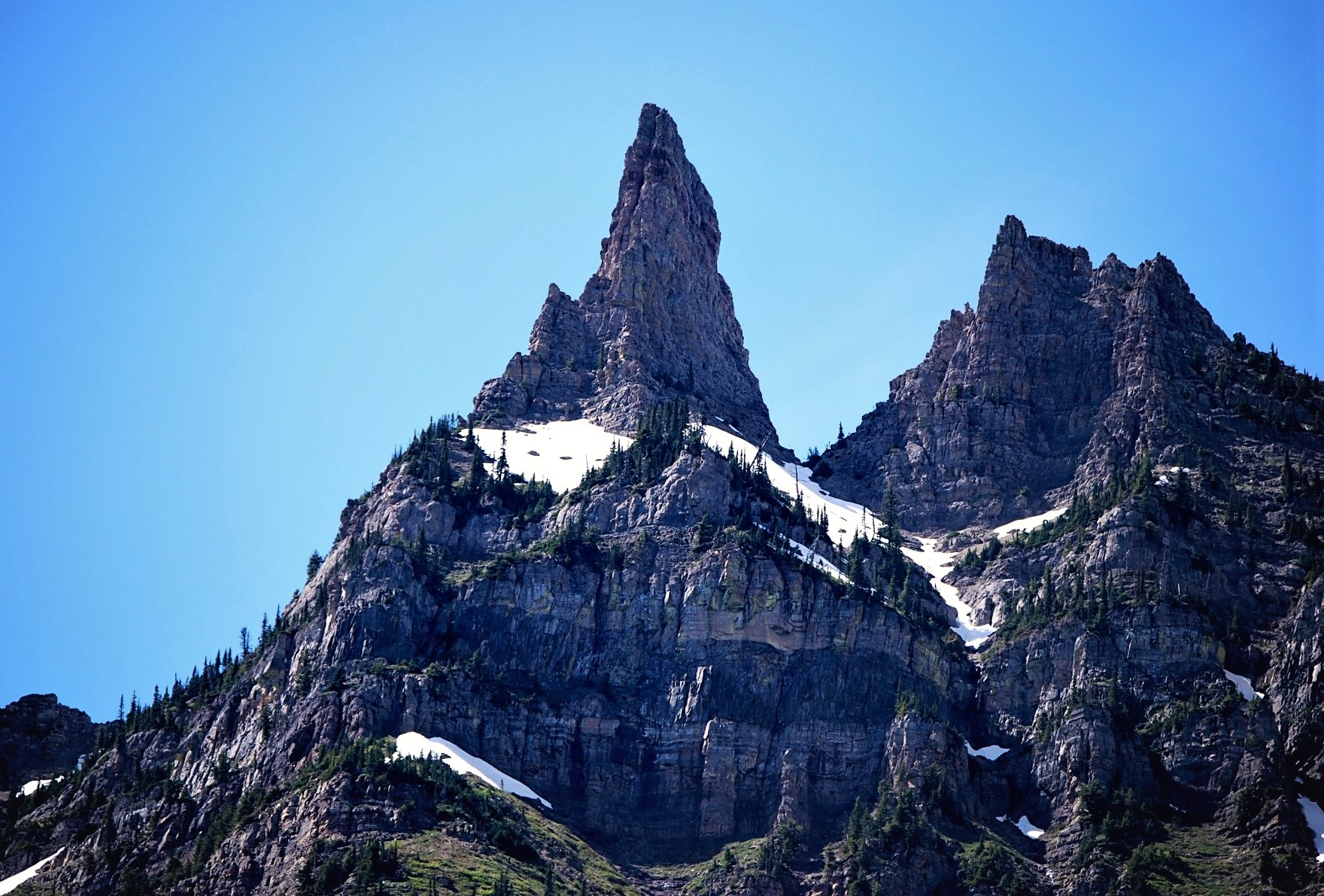
Citadel Spire

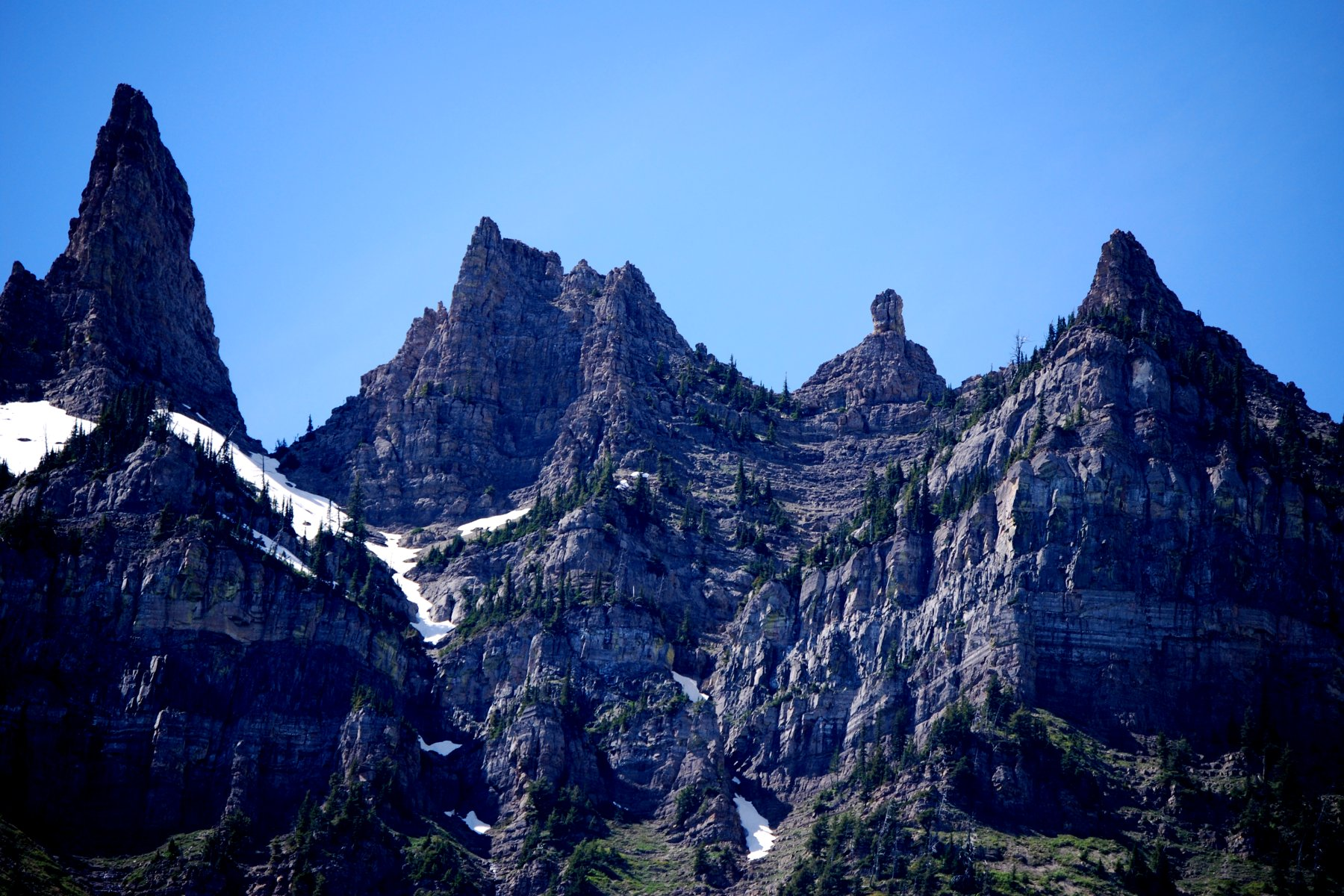

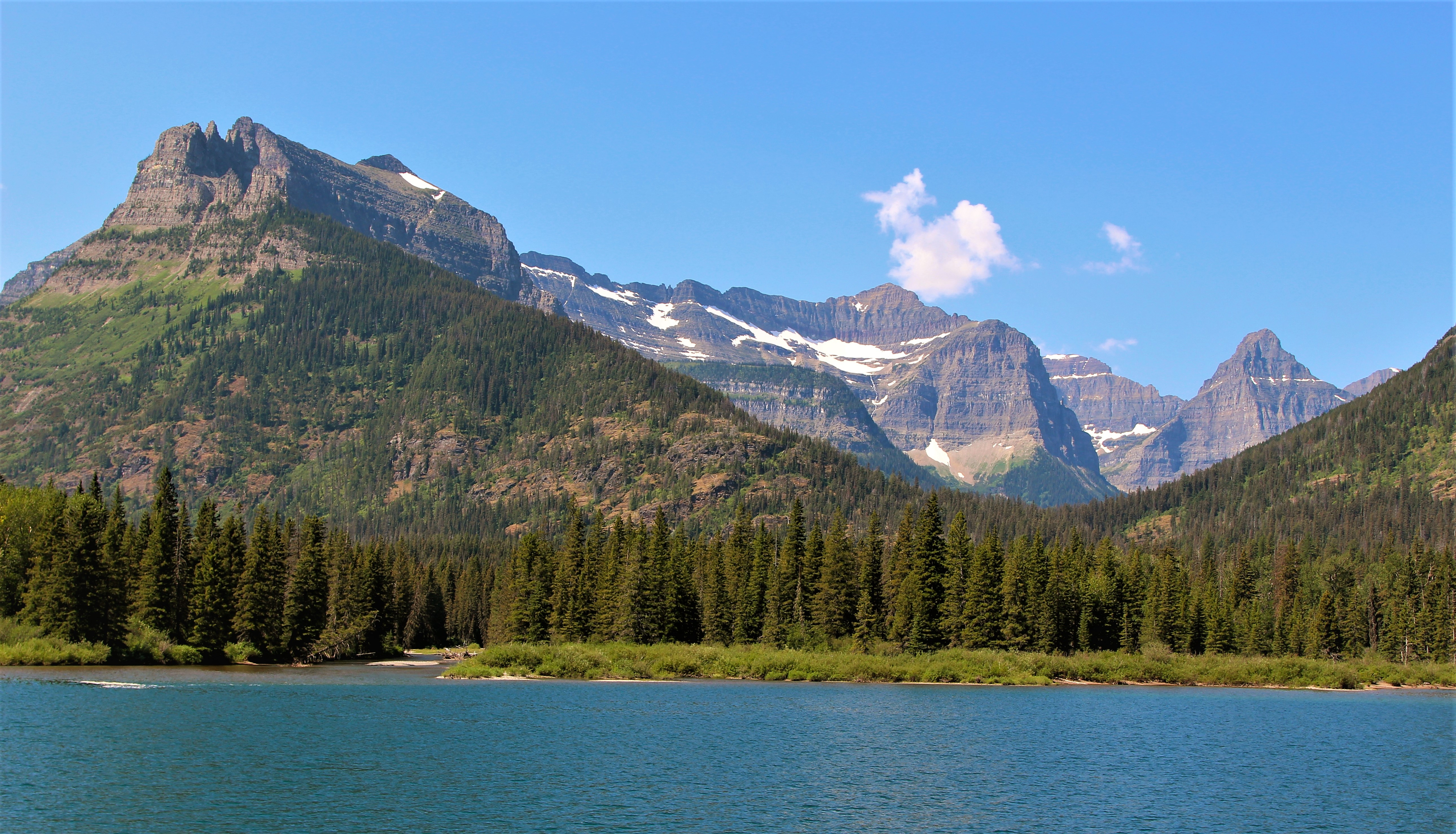
Citadel Peaks (left), and Porcupine Ridge (cloud over the summit).

== See also ==
- List of mountains and mountain ranges of Glacier National Park (U.S.)
- Geology of the Rocky Mountains
