= Olson Mountain =

Mountain in Glacier National Park, US

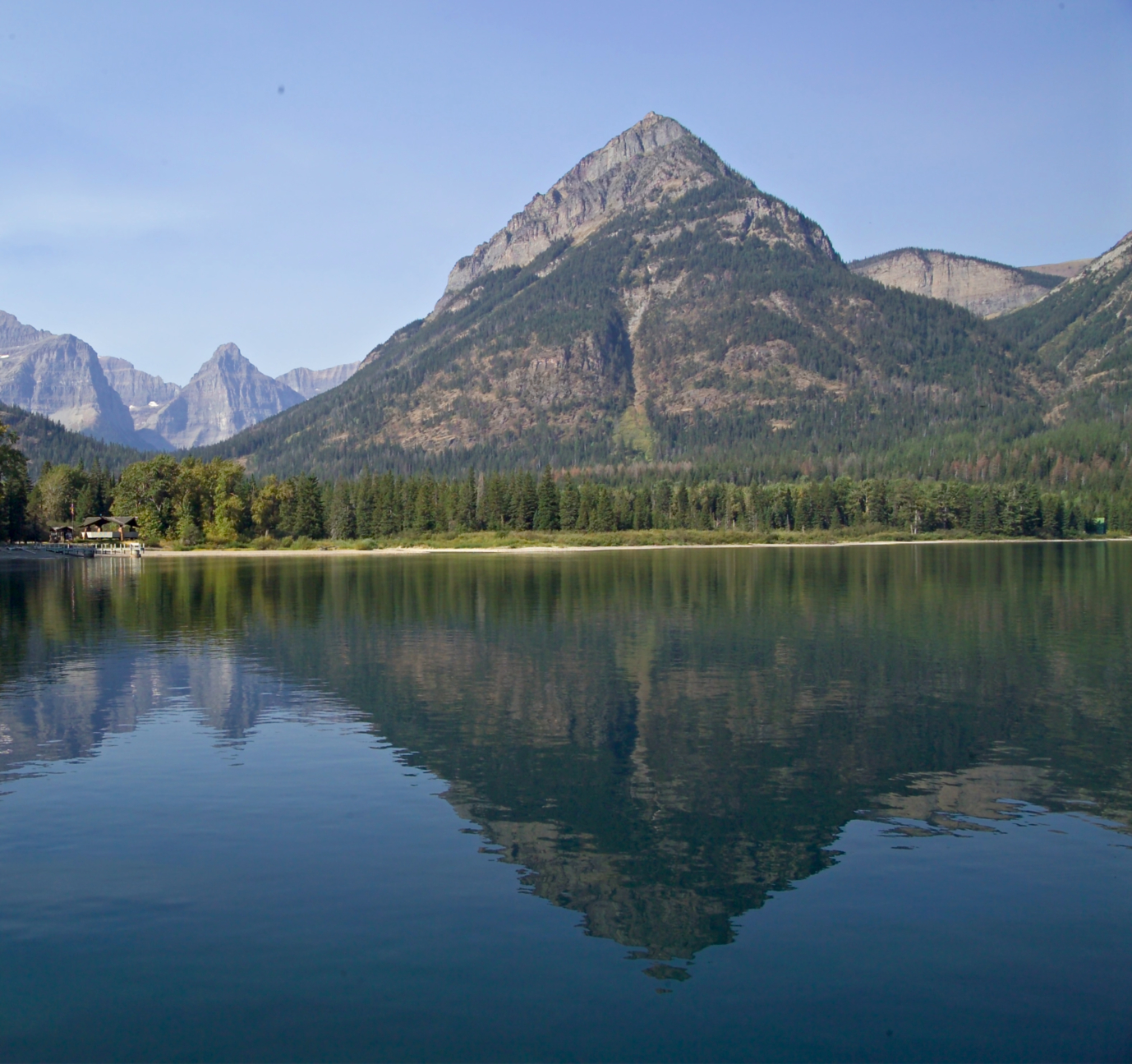
- Olson Mountain reflected in Waterton Lake

Highest point
- Elevation: 7,913 ft (2,412 m)
- Prominence: 793 ft (242 m)
- Parent peak: Campbell Mountain
- Isolation: 1.43 mi (2.30 km)
- Coordinates: 48°57′26″N 113°56′15″W

Geography
- Location within Montana Location within the United States
- Location: Glacier National Park; Glacier County, Montana, U.S.
- Parent range: Livingston Range
- Topo map: USGS Porcupine Ridge

Olson Mountain, also known as Mount Olson, is a 7,913-foot-elevation (2,412 m) mountain summit located in the Livingston Range, of Glacier National Park in the U.S. state of Montana. Olson Mountain rises more than 3,700 feet (1,100 m) above the western shore of Waterton Lake. The mountain was named for a surveyor on the International Boundary Survey, with the name officially adopted in 1929. The nearest higher peak is Campbell Mountain, 1.13 miles (1.82 km) to the north, and Citadel Peaks is two miles (3.2 km) to the south. Precipitation runoff from the mountain drains into Olson Creek before it empties to Waterton Lake.

== Climate ==
Based on the Köppen climate classification, Olson Mountain is located in a subarctic climate zone characterized by long, usually very cold winters, and short, cool to mild summers. Temperatures can drop below −10 °F with wind chill factors below −30 °F.

== Geology ==
Like other mountains in Glacier National Park, Olson Mountain is composed of sedimentary rock laid down during the Precambrian to Jurassic periods. Formed in shallow seas, this sedimentary rock was initially uplifted beginning 170 million years ago when the Lewis Overthrust fault pushed an enormous slab of precambrian rocks 3 mi (4.8 km) thick, 50 miles (80 km) wide and 160 miles (260 km) long over younger rock of the cretaceous period.

== Gallery ==
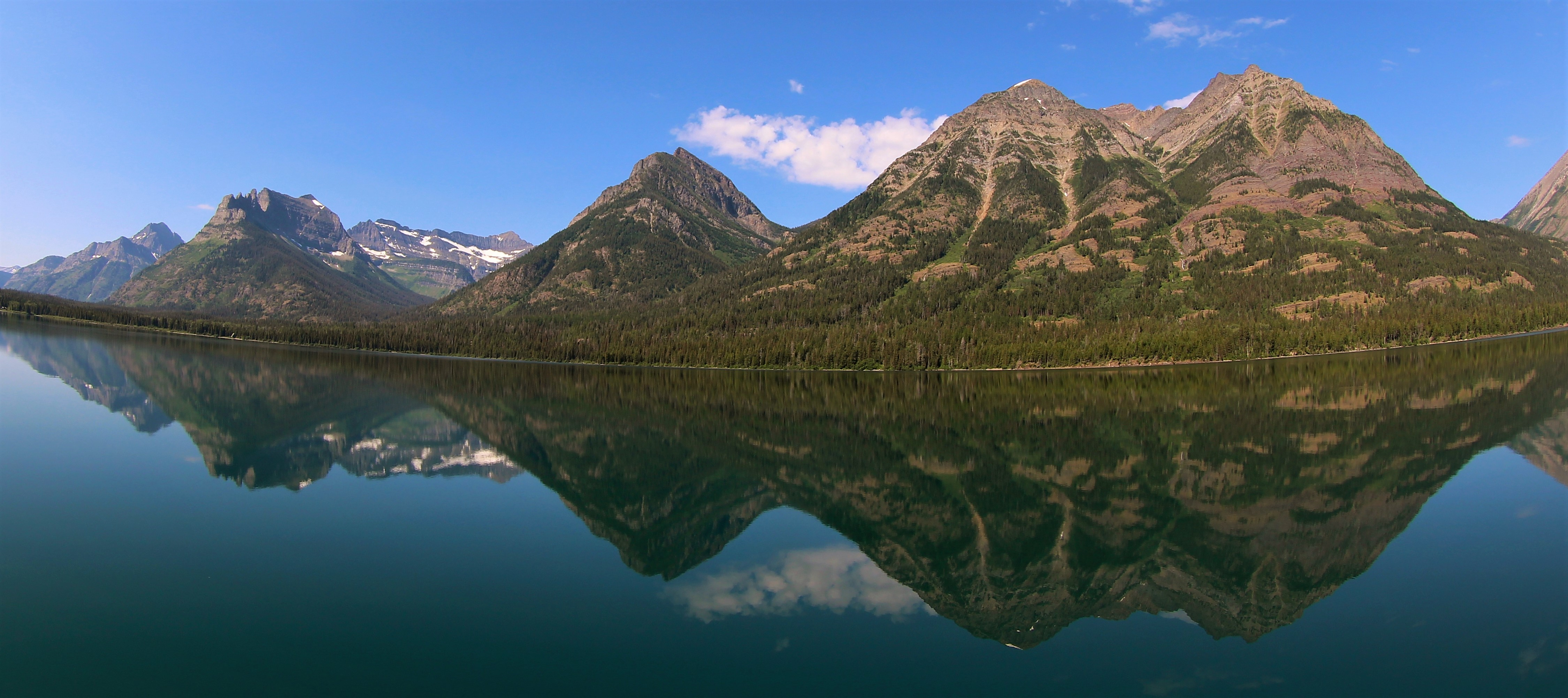
Left to right: Kootenai Peak, Citadel Peaks, Porcupine Ridge, Olson Mountain, Campbell Mountain.

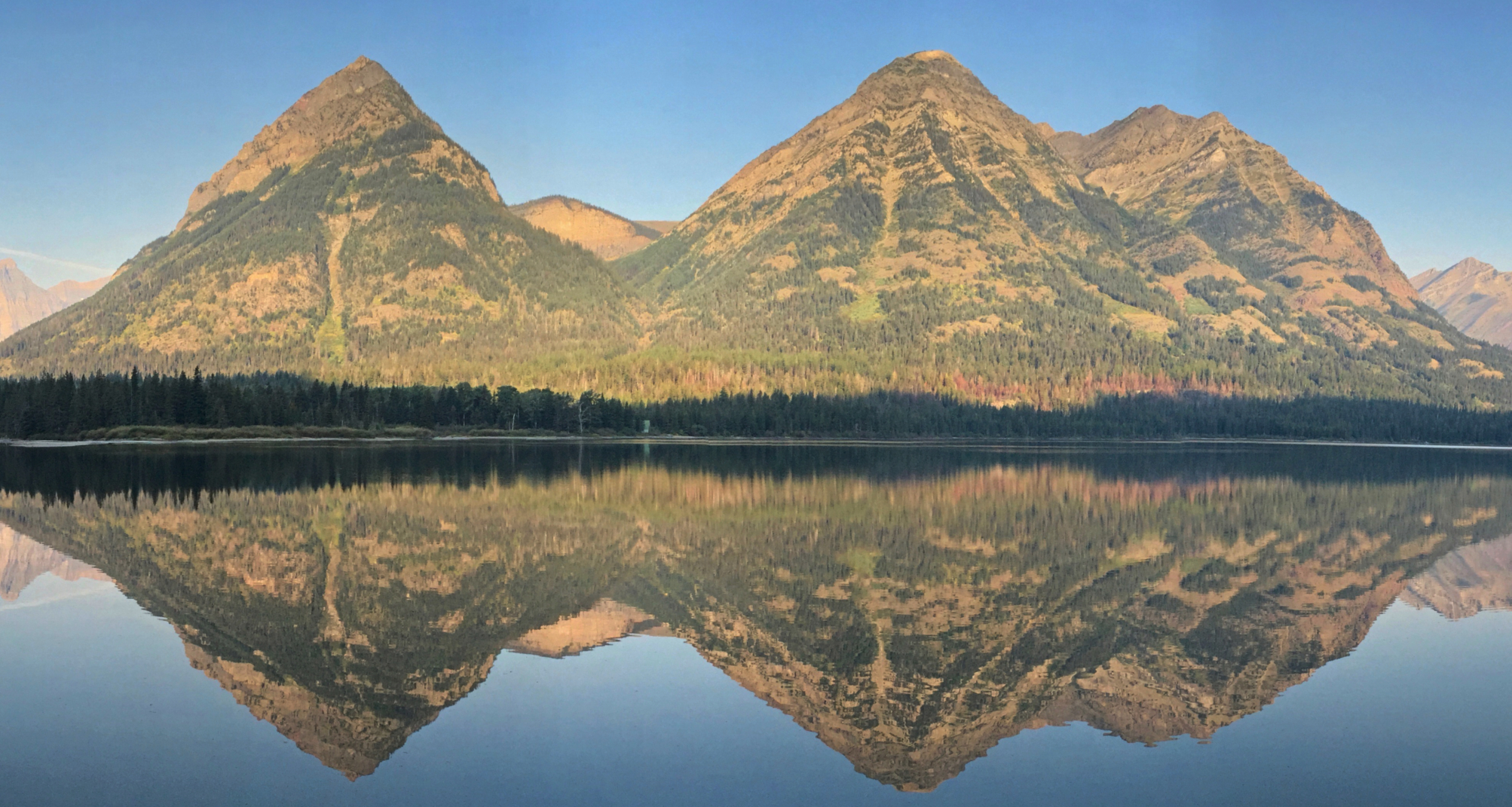
Olson Mountain (left) and Campbell Mountain (right) reflected in Waterton Lake

== See also ==
- List of mountains and mountain ranges of Glacier National Park (U.S.)
- Geology of the Rocky Mountains
