= Lake Janet =

Lake in Montana, United States

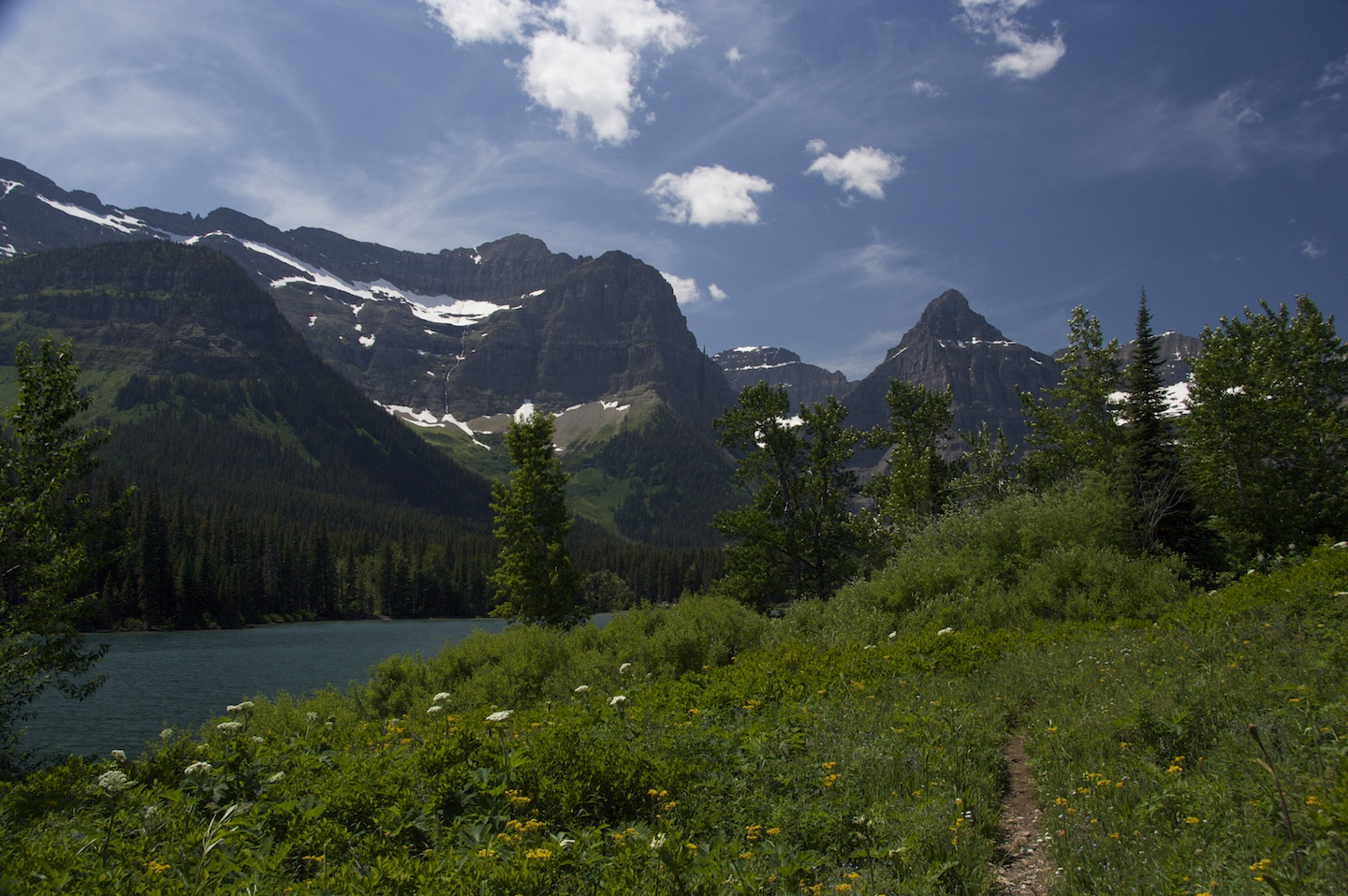
- Lake Janet looking southwest

- Location within Montana Location within the United States
- Location: Glacier National Park, Glacier County, Montana, US
- Coordinates: 48°56′39″N 113°56′39″W
- Type: Natural
- Primary inflows: Olson Creek
- Primary outflows: Olson Creek
- Basin countries: United States
- Max. length: .35 miles (0.56 km)
- Max. width: .15 miles (0.24 km)
- Surface elevation: 4,924 ft (1,501 m)

Lake Janet is located in Glacier National Park, in the U. S. state of Montana. Lake Janet is south of Olson Mountain, north of Porcupine Ridge, northwest of Citadel Peaks, and 2.5 miles (4.0 km) southwest of Waterton Lake.

== See also ==
- List of lakes in Glacier County, Montana
