= Guardhouse =

Building to house security personnel and equipment

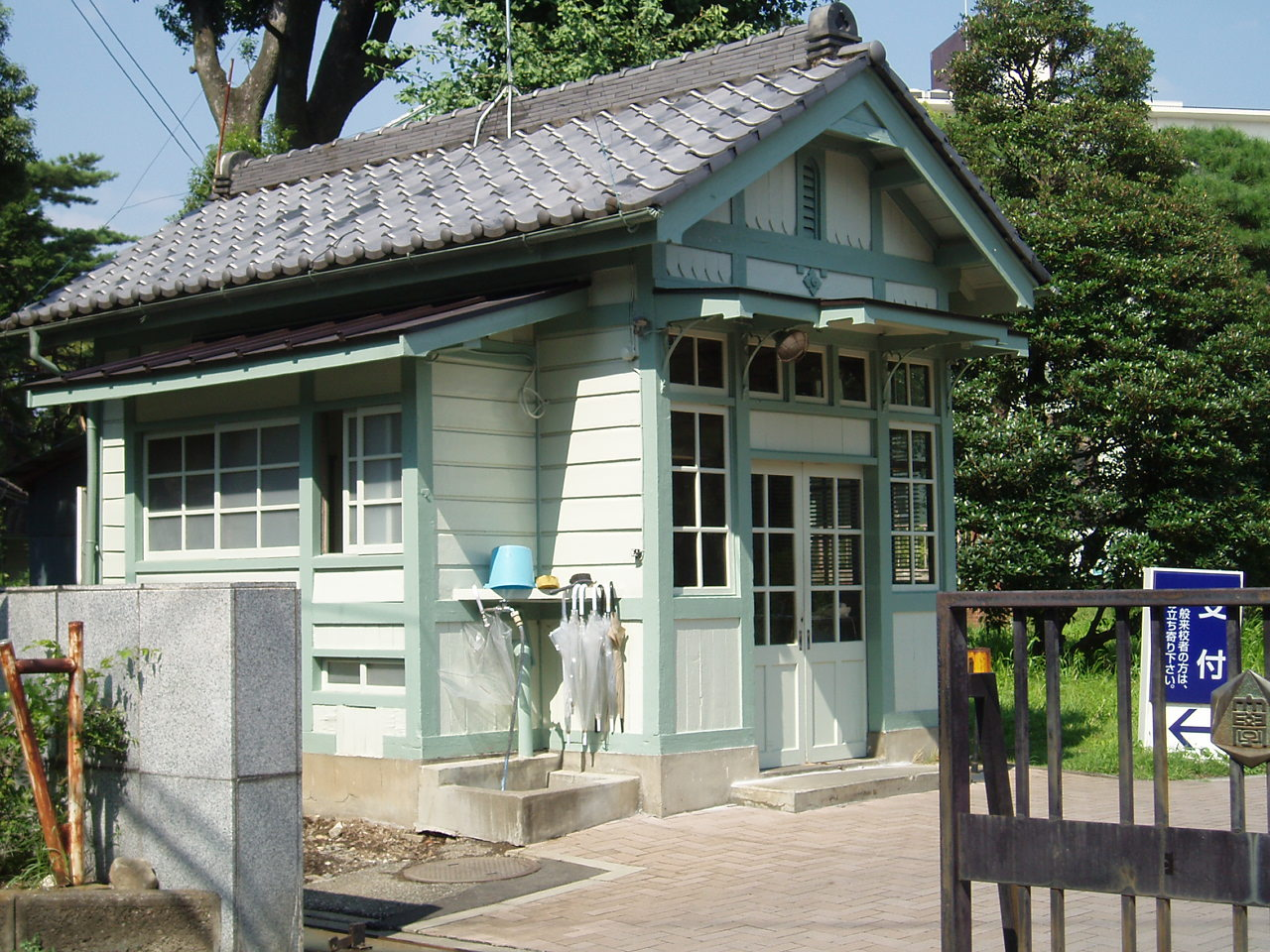
Guardhouse (built in 1915) located on the Kiryu Campus of Japan's Gunma University

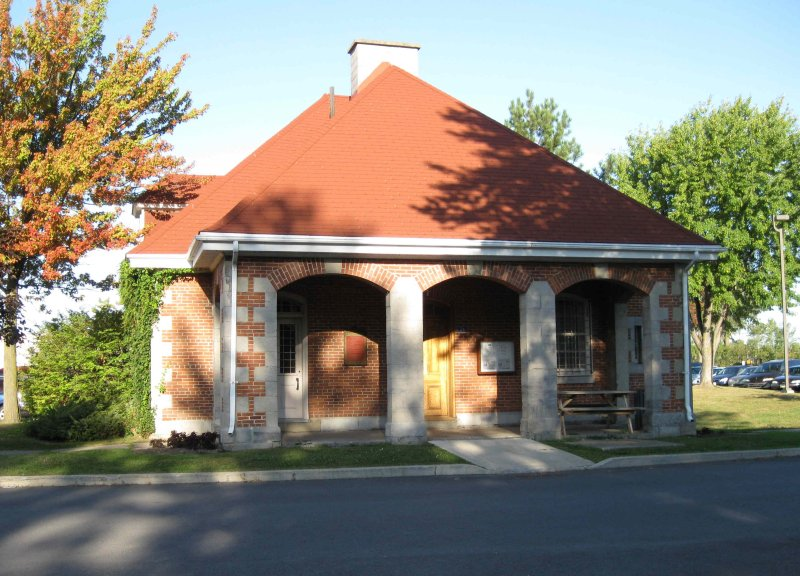
Guardhouse, Royal Military College of Canada

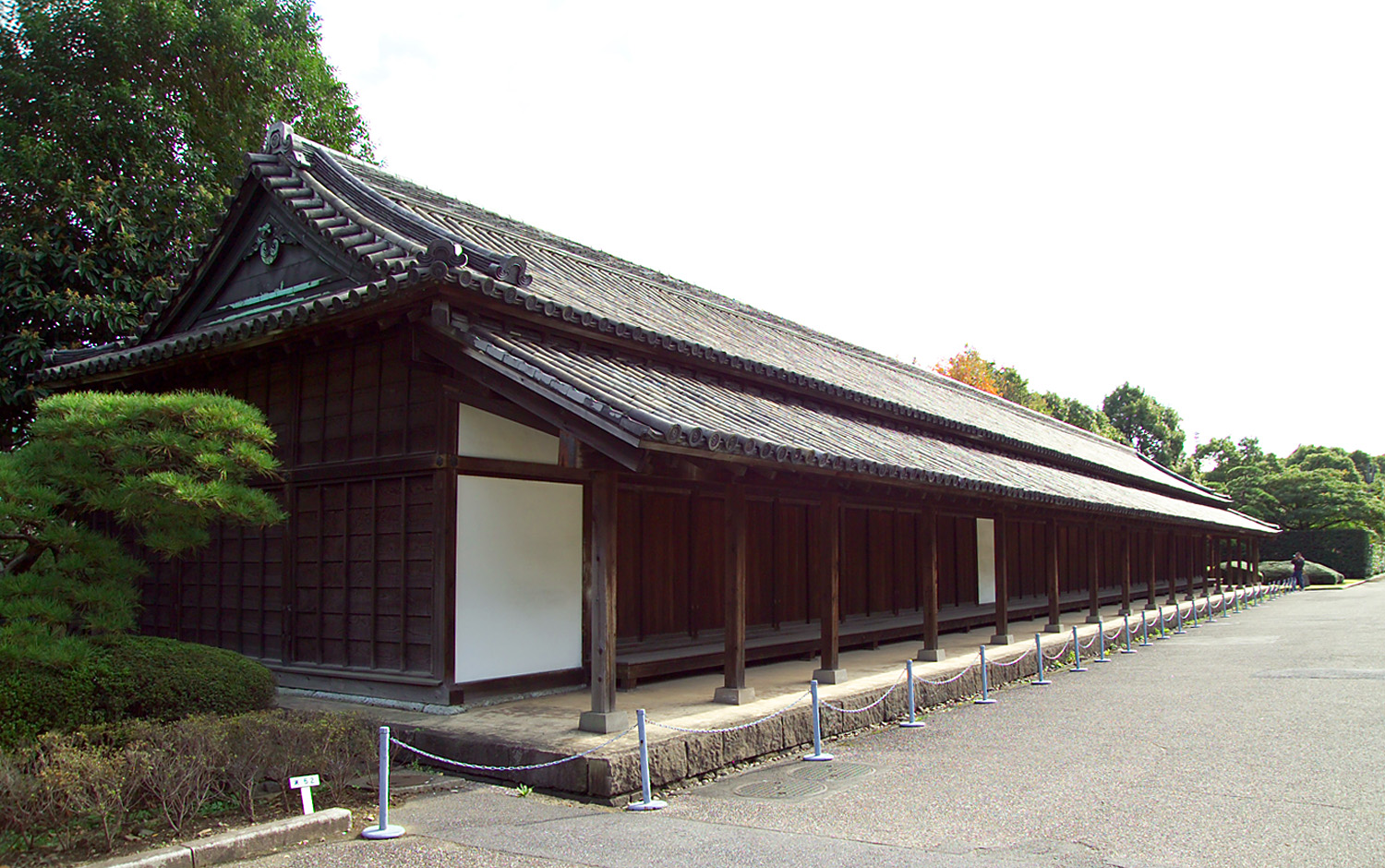
The Hyakunin Bansho (former guard house) inside the former Imperial Palace, Edo Castle) was staffed by 100 samurai.

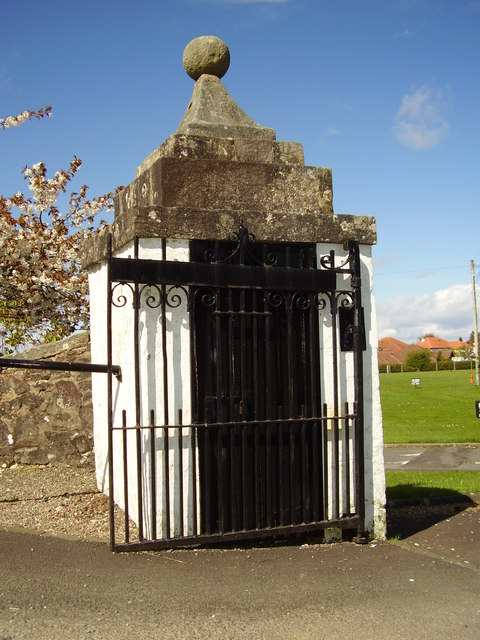
Guardhouses were constructed in graveyards in the 1800s to prevent bodysnatching.

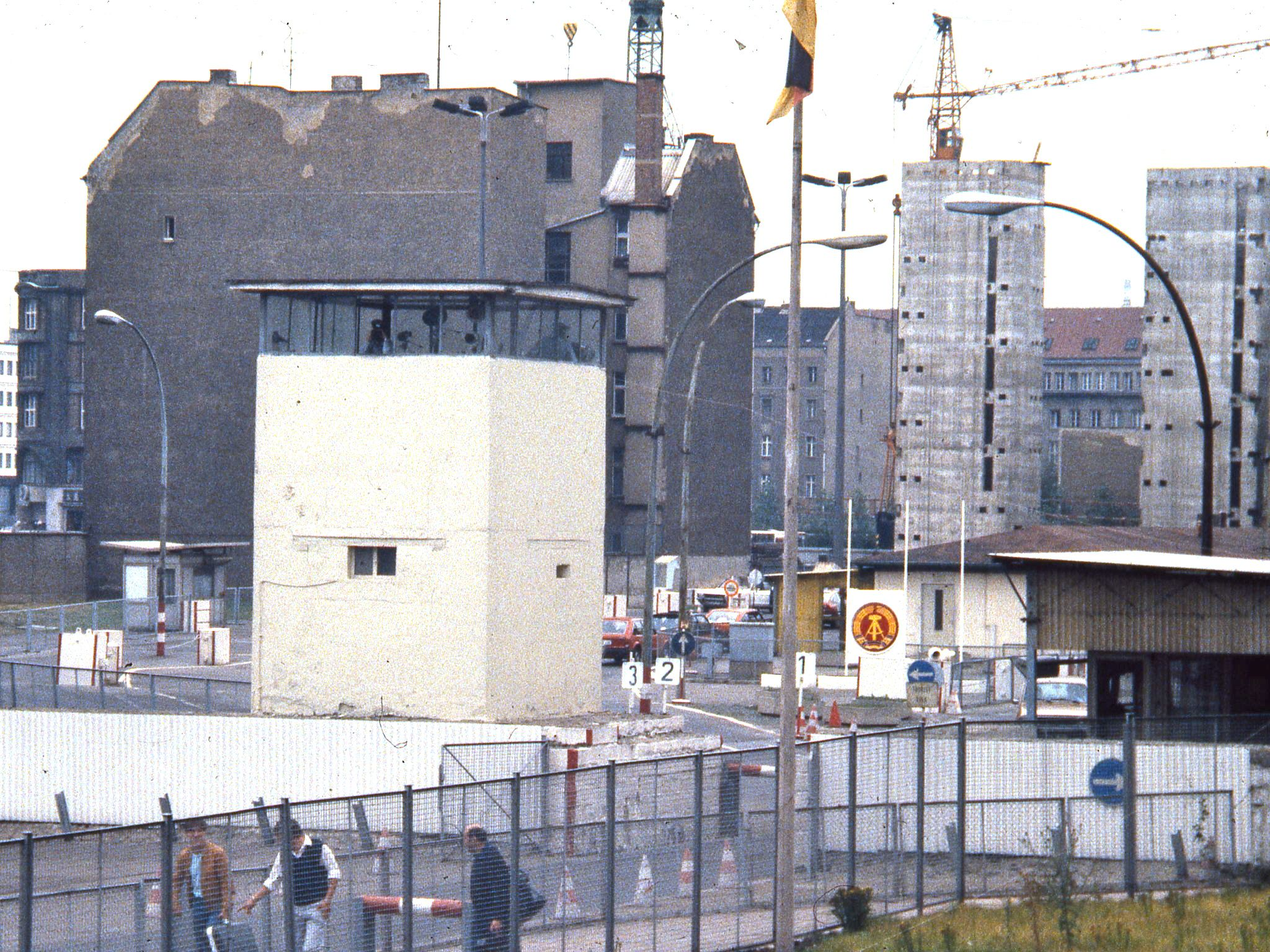
East German border guardhouse in Berlin, 1984

A guardhouse (also known as a watch house, guard building, guard booth, guard shack, security booth, security building, or sentry building) is a building used to house personnel and security equipment. Guardhouses have historically been dormitories for sentries or guards, and places where sentries not posted to sentry posts wait "on call," but are more recently staffed by a contracted security company. Some guardhouses also function as jails.

== Modern guardhouses ==
In 21st century commercial, industrial, institutional, governmental, or residential facilities, guardhouses are generally placed at the entrance as checkpoints for securing, monitoring and maintaining access control into the secured facility. In the case of small to mid-sized facilities, generally, the entire physical security envelope is controlled from the guardhouse.

One of the General Orders of a Sentry in the United States Navy and Marine Corps is to "repeat all calls from posts more distant from the guardhouse than my own." Guardhouses thus serve as central communications hubs for outlying sentry posts, being where the Corporal of the Guard is stationed. When sentries are relieved by their replacements, the sentry stationed at the first guardhouse (typically designated "No. 1") is conventionally relieved first.

Modern guardhouses are manufactured with welded, galvanized steel construction. They are usually insulated, include air conditioning units, possess lights, have 360-degree visibility, and can also be bullet resistant. These guardhouses keep security guards comfortable as well as secure. Par-Kut was one of the first companies to manufacture modern guardhouses, beginning in 1954. In the 21st century, guardhouses have provided more options such as exterior floodlights, reflective bullet resistant glass, gun ports, elevated platforms, highly mobile trailer mounting, anti-fatigue floor mats, dimmable interior light, and a built-in bathroom.

== Historical guardhouses ==
In the Fortress of Louisbourg in the 18th century, guardhouses were where sentries were stationed to eat and sleep between periods of sentry duty at the 21 sentry posts around the town. The town had five guardhouses—the Dauphine Gate, the townside entrance to the King's Bastion, the Queen's Gate, the Maurepas Gate, and the Pièce de la Grave—and whilst not sleeping, sentries would be "on call" from those guardhouses at need.

In the guardhouse at Fort Scott National Historic Site, typical furnishings for guard quarters included benches, tables, shelves, a platform bed for the men resting between assignments, arms racks, a fireplace or stove, and leather buckets (used for firefighting, which was another duty of guards). Prison cells were unfurnished, containing simply a slop bucket and iron rings on walls for the attachment of shackles.

== See also ==
- Gatehouse
- Neue Wache
- Kōban
- The Guardhouse, a mountain in Montana
- Guard tower
- Sentry box
- Blockhouse
