= The Guardhouse =

Mountain in Montana, United States

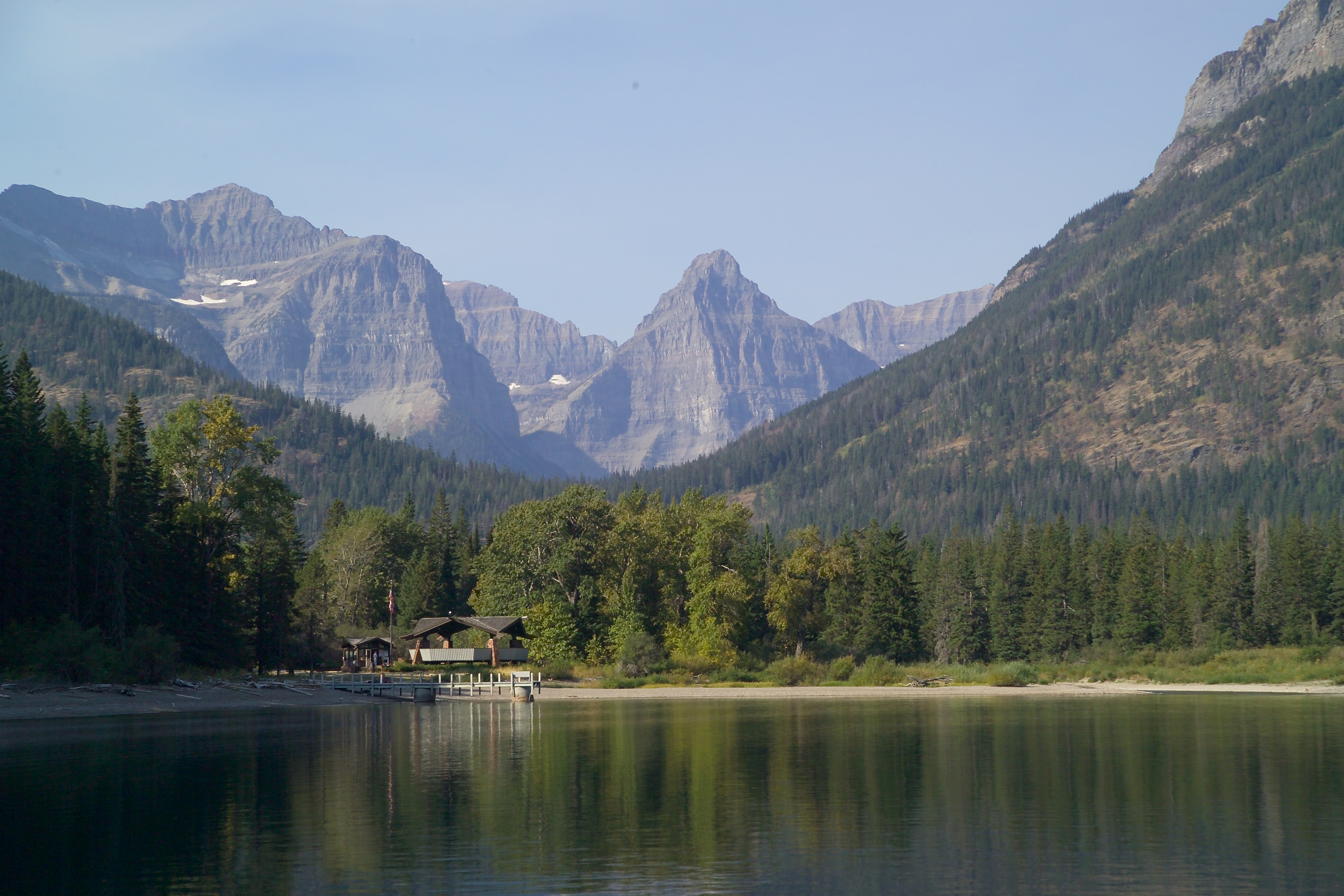
- The Guardhouse left of center behind Porcupine Ridge, from Waterton Lake

Highest point
- Elevation: 9,341 ft (2,847 m) NAVD 88
- Prominence: 2,777 ft (846 m)
- Coordinates: 48°54′57″N 114°01′00″W

Geography
- Location within Montana Location within the United States
- Location: Flathead County, Montana, Glacier County, Montana, U.S.
- Parent range: Livingston Range
- Topo map(s): USGS Mount Carter, MT

Climbing
- First ascent: Unknown
- Easiest route: class 3

The Guardhouse (9,341 feet (2,847 m)) is located in the Livingston Range, Glacier National Park in the U.S. state of Montana. The Guardhouse is situated on the Continental Divide.

== Geology ==
Like other mountains in Glacier National Park, the peak is composed of sedimentary rock laid down during the Precambrian to Jurassic periods. Formed in shallow seas, this sedimentary rock was initially uplifted beginning 170 million years ago when the Lewis Overthrust fault pushed an enormous slab of precambrian rocks 3 mi (4.8 km) thick, 50 miles (80 km) wide and 160 miles (260 km) long over younger rock of the cretaceous period.

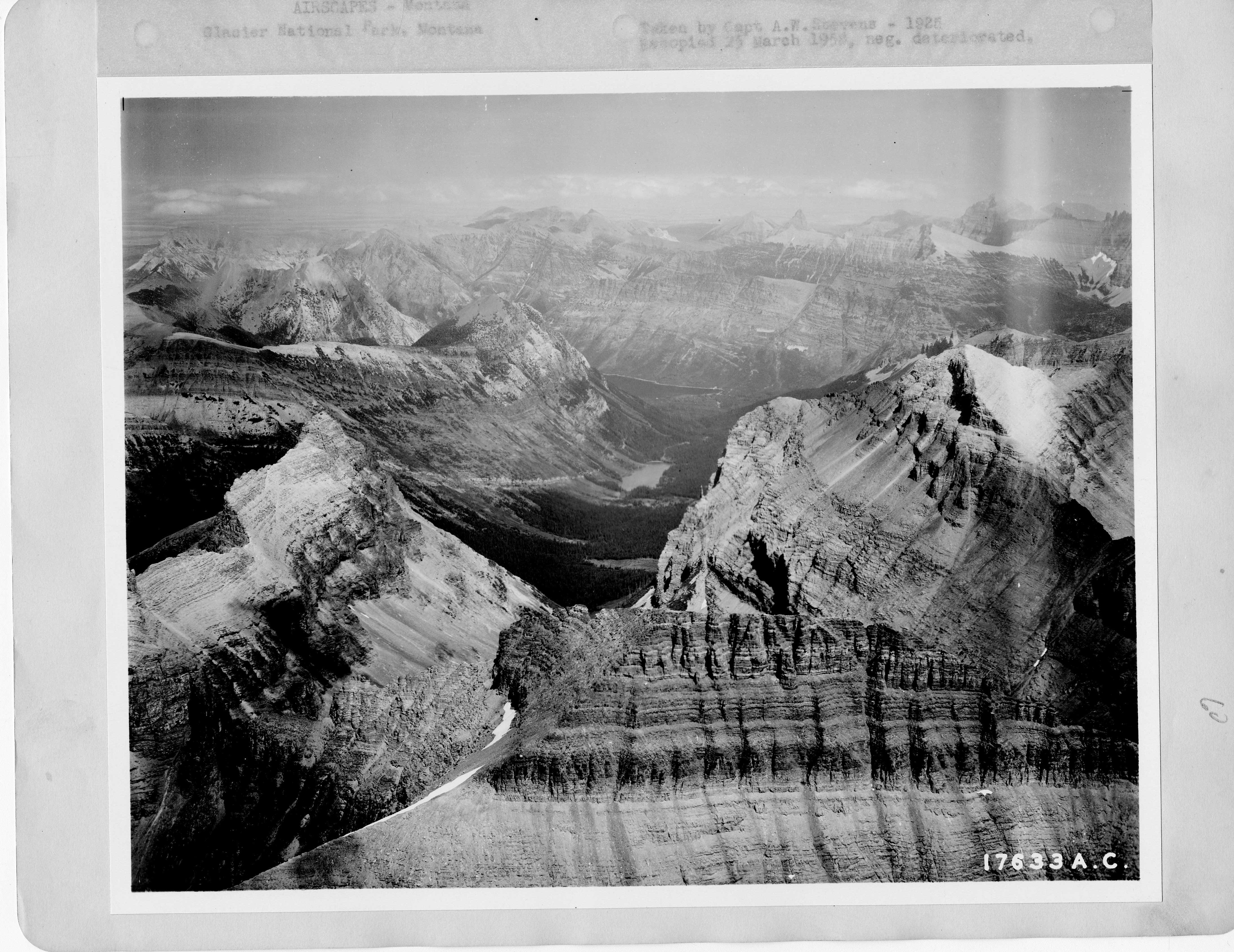
The Guardhouse at bottom of frame. Aerial view looking ENE.

== Climate ==
Based on the Köppen climate classification, the peak is located in an alpine subarctic climate zone with long, cold, snowy winters, and cool to warm summers. Temperatures can drop below −10 °F with wind chill factors below −30 °F.

== See also ==
- List of mountains and mountain ranges of Glacier National Park (U.S.)
