= Goathaunt Bunkhouse =

- U.S. National Register of Historic Places
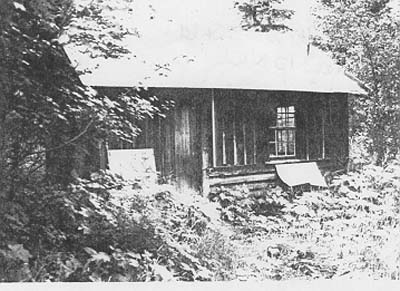

- Location within Montana Location within the United States
- Location: S end of Waterton Lake, Glacier NP, St. Mary, Montana
- Coordinates: 48°57′39″N 113°53′53″W
- Built: 1930
- Architect: Glacier Park Hotel Co., George Baker
- MPS: Glacier National Park MPS
- NRHP reference No.: 95001568
- Added to NRHP: January 19, 1996

The Goathaunt Bunkhouse was built as a service structure by the Glacier Park Hotel Company for the development of the Goathaunt site in Glacier National Park. This was part of the Great Northern Railway's broader development of the park as a tourist destination. The bunkhouse is the last surviving structure of this era at this location, near the southern end of Waterton Lake. Its design has been attributed to National Park Service landscape architect Thomas Chalmers Vint.

The site is at the southern end of Waterton Lake, near the modern Goat Haunt Ranger Station. It was built to house the crew of the M.V. International, a small passenger launch that plied the route between the American and Canadian ends of Waterton Lake.
