= Goat Haunt =

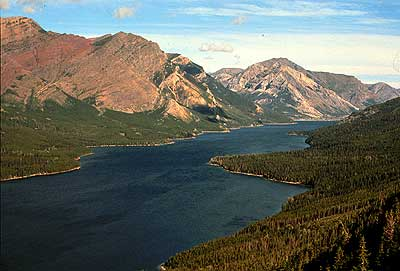
Goat Haunt Overlook, a steep hike from the ranger station, offers an expansive view of Waterton Lake stretching into Canada.

Goat Haunt is a region of Glacier National Park in Montana, United States. Goat Haunt is located at the head of Waterton lake which is fed by the Waterton River. The headwaters for the Waterton River are located South of Goat Haunt Ranger Station at unnamed lakes located slightly higher than Nashukin Lake. The Goat Haunt area shares Waterton Lake with Waterton Lakes National Park in Canada. This area is important for reinforcing the international nature of the Waterton-Glacier International Peace Park. It also provides hiking trails that connect the United States and Canada. The region provides wildlife habitats on both sides of the border. As a largely unspoiled natural area, visitors experience an area with few facilities or amenities, but with historical importance including Waterton Townsite and mountain passes used by American Indians.

Goat Haunt Ranger Station includes an International Peace Park Pavilion which showcases the Waterton-Glacier International Peace Park agreement. The Pavilion is located right off the main dock at the ranger station. This dock is where "The International" a tourist vessel that sails from Waterton Townsite to Goat Haunt Ranger station multiple times per day during the summer season. The Goathaunt Bunkhouse is a historic structure located near the boat dock. Goat Haunt Ranger station also has a smaller dock where private vessels, US Border Patrol's boat and NPS boats can dock when needed. The border crossing at Goat Haunt is no longer staffed by US Customs personnel and all travelers (boat and hiking) are required to check in before arriving in Goat Haunt by using CBP ROAM or calling the port of Piegan 406-732-5982 x 201. Visitors to this area must have carry proof of ROAM trip approval before being allowed further entry beyond the Goat Haunt area. Other international visitors to this area, should make a lawful entry at the Chief Mountain or Piegan Port of Entry prior to arriving in Goat Haunt. Goat Haunt Ranger Station also has a bunkhouse where NPS employees such as trail crews, maintenance teams or rangers live during the summer. There is another building for rangers with small apartment style living for rangers.

Goat Haunt Ranger Station is the first Ranger Station reached when hiking south on the Continental Divide Trail which goes from the Canada–United States border just north of Goat Haunt south all the way to the US/Mexican border. The Pacific Northwest National Scenic Trail also passes by Goat Haunt as it travels from Chief Mountain Customs on the east side of the park all the way to the Pacific Ocean on Washington's Olympic Peninsula.

Hikers starting in Canada and crossing the border must report this entry using CBP ROAM program or by calling the port of Piegan 406-732-5982 x201. Proof of ROAM trip registration must be carried with the traveler and presented to US Border Patrol agents upon request. Customs and Border Protection, Office of Field Operations Officers no longer staff the Goat Haunt Port of Entry; so you must use ROAM. Other familiar law enforcement agencies in the area include U.S. Border Patrol Agents and National Park Service LE Rangers, conducting patrols of the trails in the areas around Goat Haunt.

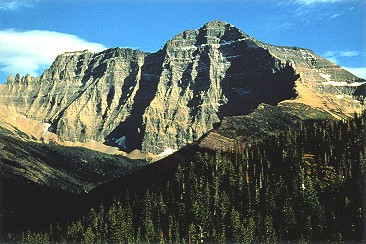
Mount Cleveland towers over the Goat Haunt area.
