= Livingston Range =

Mountain range in Canada and United States

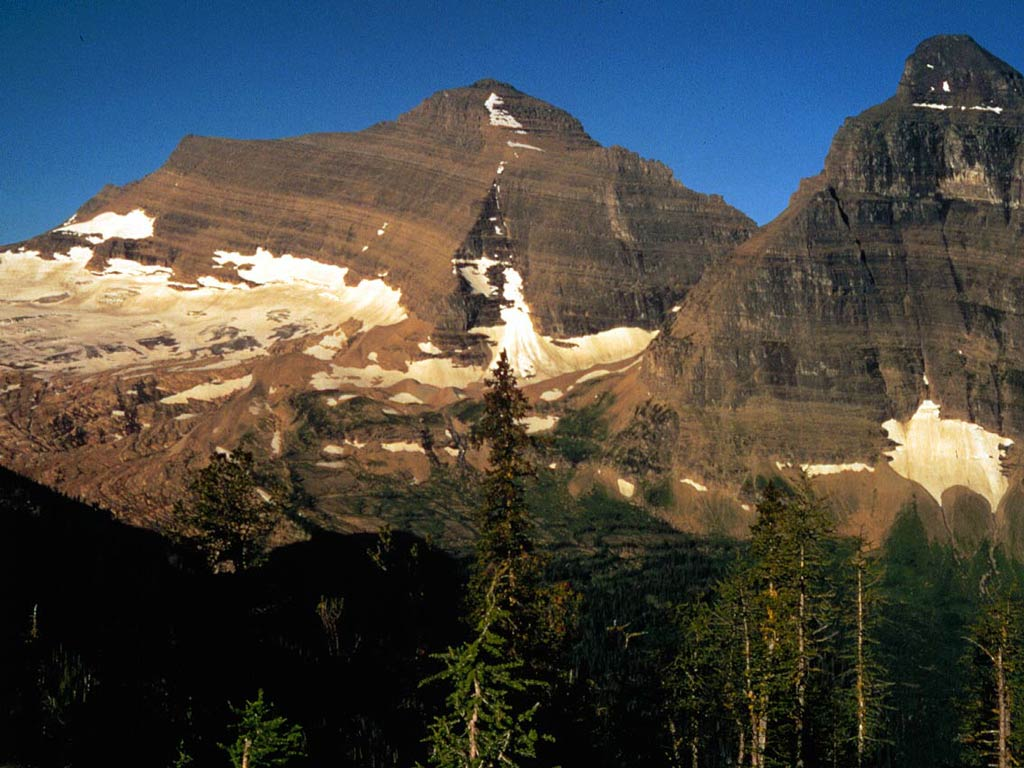
- Kintla Peak

Highest point
- Peak: Kintla Peak
- Elevation: 10,101 ft (3,079 m)
- Coordinates: 48°56′38″N 114°10′16″W

Dimensions
- Length: 36 mi (58 km)
- Width: 28 mi (45 km)

Geography
- Location within Montana Location within the United States
- Countries: United States and Canada
- States/Provinces: Montana and British Columbia
- Parent range: Rocky Mountains

Geology
- Orogeny: Lewis Overthrust

The Livingston Range is a mountain range located primarily in Glacier National Park in the U.S. state of Montana, and in the extreme southeastern section of the Canadian province of British Columbia. The range is 36 miles (58 km) long and 28 miles (45 km) wide. Over 15 summits exceed 9,000 ft (2,700 m) above sea level, and the highest point is Kintla Peak at 10,101 feet (3,079 m). (While these elevations are not particularly high for North American mountains, they are high compared to the roughly 4,000 foot (1,200 m) elevation of the nearby valleys, making for particularly dramatic peaks.)

The Livingston Range was uplifted beginning 170 million years ago when the Lewis Overthrust fault pushed an enormous slab of precambrian rocks 3 mi (4.8 km) thick, 50 miles (80 km) wide and 160 miles (260 km) long over newer rocks of the cretaceous period.

== See also ==
- List of mountain ranges in Montana
- Mountains and mountain ranges of Glacier National Park (U.S.)

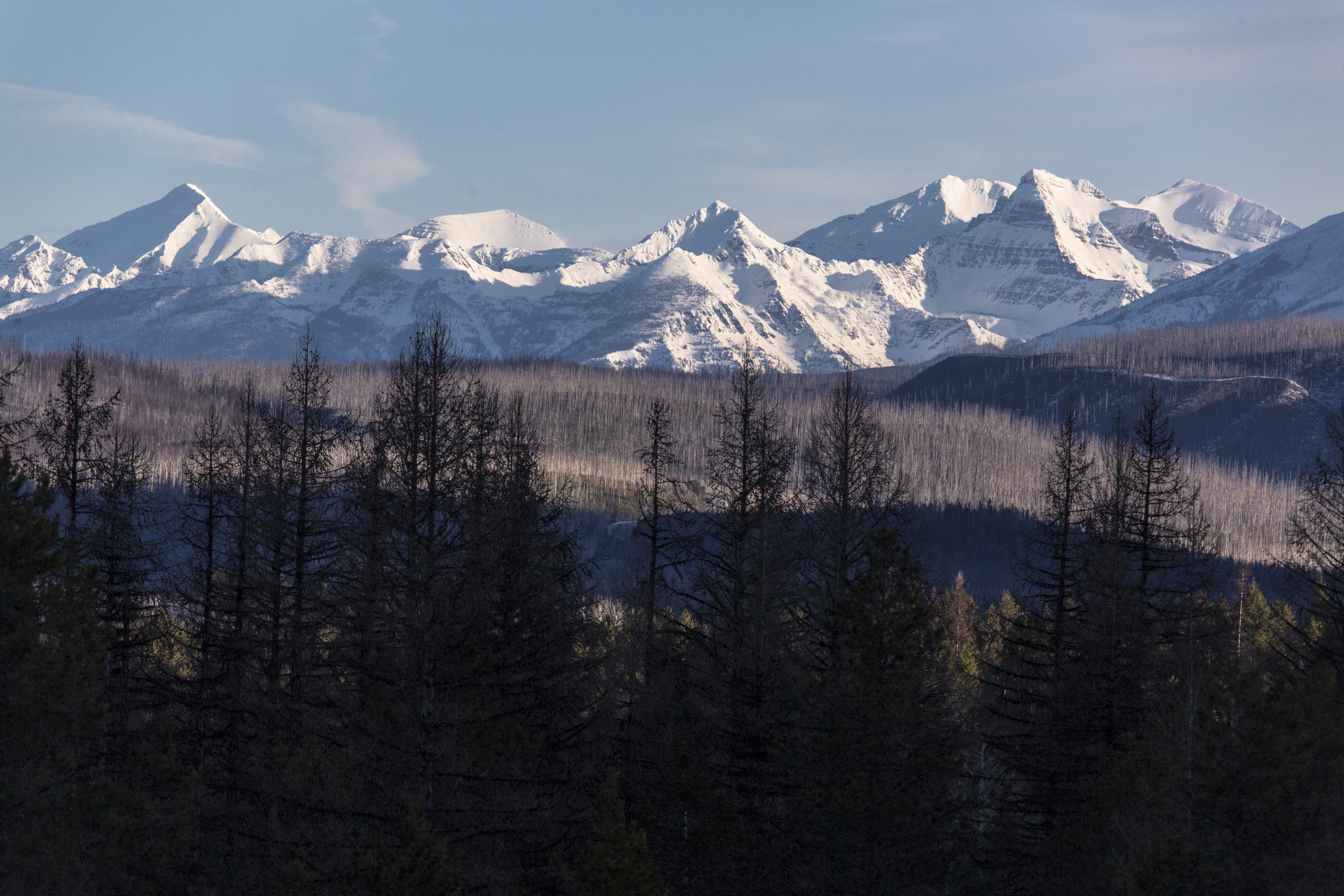
Livingston Range, left to rightː Rainbow Peak, Mount Carter, Logging Mountain, Vulture Peak.
