= Lewis Overthrust =

Geologic thrust fault of the Rocky Mountains

Lewis Overthrust as seen behind a pack mule from Summit Trailhead Connector Trail #133.1.

The Lewis Overthrust is a geologic thrust fault structure of the Rocky Mountains found within the bordering national parks of Glacier in Montana, United States and Waterton Lakes in Alberta, Canada. The structure was created due to the collision of tectonic plates about 59-75 million years ago that drove a several mile thick wedge of Precambrian rock 50 mi (80 km) eastwards, causing it to overlie softer Cretaceous age rock that is 1300 to 1400 million years younger.

The décollement can be seen from Marias Pass as a thin tan line of rock roughly halfway up Summit Mountain and Little Dog Mountain.

== Geography ==
The Canadian Rocky Mountain foreland thrust and fold belt is a northeastward tapering deformational belt consisting of Mesoproterozoic, Paleozoic, and Mesozoic strata. The Lewis thrust sheet is one of the major structures of the foreland thrust and fold belt extending over 280 mi (450 km) from Mount Kidd near Calgary, AB in the Southeast Canadian Cordillera to Steamboat Mountain, located west of Great Falls, Northwest Montana in the United States. The Lewis overthrust provides scientific insight into geologic processes happening in other parts of the world, like the Andes and the Himalaya Mountains.

== Geology and tectonics ==
=== Tectonic initiation and the Canadian Cordillera ===
The onset of Cordilleran orogenesis began in the Middle Jurassic time, as a result of the breakup of Pangea and North American plate motion toward subduction zones at the western margin. Most of the Canadian Cordillera today consists of numerous tectonostratigraphic terranes that were accreted to the stable margin of North America from the Jurassic to Early Tertiary as a result of eastward and northward drifting island arcs that collided with the continental lithosphere of North America. These terranes were accreted due to upper-crustal rocks being detached from the denser lower-crustal and proto-Pacific upper mantle lithosphere that was subducted under the North American craton. The allochthonous upper crustal terranes were juxtaposed over top of each other and over the western margin of the North American craton along a system of interconnected, northeast and southwest verging major thrust faults.

=== Rise of the Rockies and formation of the Rocky Mountain Thrust and Fold Belt ===
The onset of deformation of the Rocky Mountain fold and thrust belt was due to collisional tectonic forces that occurred on the west edge of the North American craton. This thrust and fold belt was uplifted east of the Canadian Cordillera and formed between the Middle Jurassic and Early Eocene within an easterly tapering wedge of Mesoproterozoic to early Cenozoic sedimentary rocks that were deposited in the Western Canada sedimentary basin. A profound unconformity separates the sedimentary cover from the Archean to Paleoproterozoic crystalline crust of North America. This thrust and fold belt has a thin skinned geometry as indicated by the array of thrust faults that interleave and overlap along strike and cut across strata at low to moderate angle that flatten with depth, repeat the same Cambrian to Triassic stratigraphy from thrust sheet to thrust sheet, and merge into a common basal décollement, the Rocky Mountain basal décollement. The Rocky Mountain thrust and fold belt propagated from west to east, accommodating up to 120 mi (200 km) of horizontal shortening near the Canada and US border, and about 43 mi (70 km) in northern parts of BC and Montana. The eastern boundary of the fold and thrust belt is marked by the easternmost deformed strata known in outcrop and or in the subsurface. Because strata underlying the Alberta plains is gently dipping, it is difficult to pinpoint the edge of deformation on this side of the belt. On the west side, the Rocky Mountains are bounded by the Rocky Mountain Trench, where the trench is interpreted to overlie the western, down-dropped blocks of major normal faults that separate the southern Rocky Mountains from the Purcell mountains.

Structure and features of a compressional décollement

Horizontal shortening of the thin-skinned sediments lying above the detachment fault due to tectonic convergence must accommodate this horizontal shortening and has done so by the formation of major thrust faults with large displacement, the largest of which is the Lewis Thrust. The thrust sheets involved in the Canadian Rocky Mountain foreland thrust and fold belt consist of different aged strata indicative of significant deformation over time. The dominant structure of the deformational belt is a series of thrust faults, which are mostly listric and north-easterly or easterly verging. These thrust faults follow long bedding parallel detachments separated by ramps. As a result, a series of overlying thrust sheets is produced that follow their associated fault detachments. In addition, there is a westward dipping basal detachment that extends into the Cordilleran metamorphic core at mid-crustal levels. Strata from differing depositional environments is thought to have been scraped off of the under-riding North American craton and accreted to the over-riding Intermontane terrane during the Late Jurassic to Paleocene convergence of tectonic plates. Studies and modern dating have found that eastward propagation of thrusting took place in four distinct pulses that are separated by relative tectonic quiescence. ^{40}Ar/^{39}Ar dates indicate that these pulses occurred in the Late Jurassic (163-146 Ma), middle Cretaceous (103-99 Ma), Late Cretaceous (76-68 Ma), and late Paleocene- early Eocene (57-51 Ma), separated by quiescent periods of >40 Ma, >20 Ma, and >10 Ma respectively.

The Rockies were uplifted during the Laramide Orogeny which occurred between 80 and 55 million years ago during the Late Cretaceous to the Early Paleocene as a result of subduction of the Kula and Farallon plates beneath the North American continent. Furthermore, the first radiometric ages obtained from direct dating of thrust-fault gouge from the front ranges of the southern Canadian Rockies identified two distinct deformation episodes named the "Rundle pulse" and the "McConnell pulse". These pulses were dated and are interpreted to have occurred at 72 Ma and 52 Ma respectively.

== Lewis thrust system ==
The Lewis thrust Is a low-angle thrust fault in which Precambrian sediments have been thrust over younger Cretaceous sediments. The thrust sheet is constrained by lateral ramps on either side. In the south this occurs near Marias Pass, Montana, where the ramp geometry is parallel to the direction of sheet movement. In the north, the thrust sheet is forced up and over an oblique ramp near the Kootenay Pass region in British Columbia. The overall shape of the thrust sheet as it moved north-eastward has a general convex shape towards the foreland.

The Lewis sheet is carried by the Lewis thrust fault where the compression and thrusting (in the southern Canadian Rocky Mountains Foothills and Eastern Front ranges) was associated with oblique, right-hand convergence between the Intermontane terrane and the North American craton. This transpression in the Late Cretaceous led to the tectonic inversion of the Cordilleran miogeocline and the Belt-Purcell basin as the Lewis sheet began to buckle and fold, where strata was then overturned until a break or fault was formed. This involved thick successions of Paleozoic rocks that make up the Corilleran miogeocline and the underlying Neoproterozoic rocks to become detached from the crystalline basement; displaced up the passive-margin ramp along which they had accumulated; and juxtaposed over the flat surface of the North American craton to form the structural culmination that defines the Main Ranges of the Canadian Rockies. Similarly, the thick succession of Mesoproterozoic strata consisting of the Belt-Purcell supergroup followed the same sequence of events leading to the structural culmination seen in the southern end of the Purcell anticlinorium.

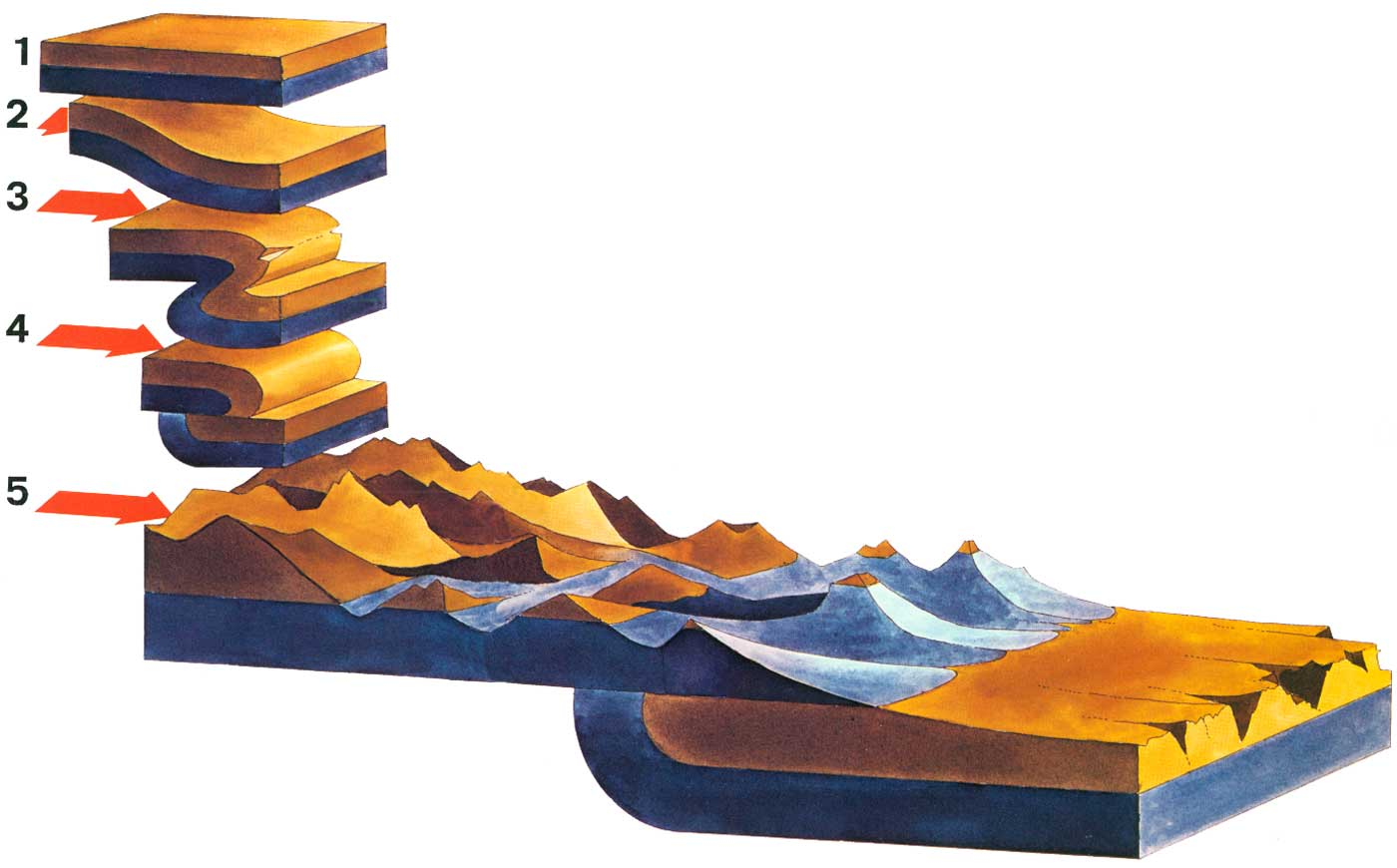
Evolution of the Lewis overthrust

The Lewis thrust is cut by two major extensional fault systems, the Flathead fault and the Rocky Mountain trench fault system. Both of which are late Eocene to Miocene in age. However, the amount of shortening that has taken place on the thrust is not connected to Eocene extension due to the Rocky Mountain trench fault system and the Flathead fault having no influence positionally on the footwall and hanging wall cutoffs of the Lewis thrust. Instead, this transpression was replaced with transtension in the early Eocene involving east–west crustal extension and tectonic exhumation, which brought up mid-crustal metamorphic rocks to the surface to be exposed. Additionally, this transition from transpression to transtension resulted in rapid cooling of the metamorphic core complexes as they were exhumed and brought to the surface. Dextral transtension on intracontinental strike-slip faults in northeastern and southwestern British Columbia culminated with the mid Eocene extensional exhumation of midcrustal metamorphic core complexes. This leads to the basal décollement being exposed and the association with north–south faulting, dyke emplacement, and voluminous magmatism, which in turn, marked cessation of crustal shortening. Paleotemperatures and geothermal gradients indicate that the Lewis thrust sheet was 7.5–8.4 mi (12–13.5 km) thick when thrusting commenced.

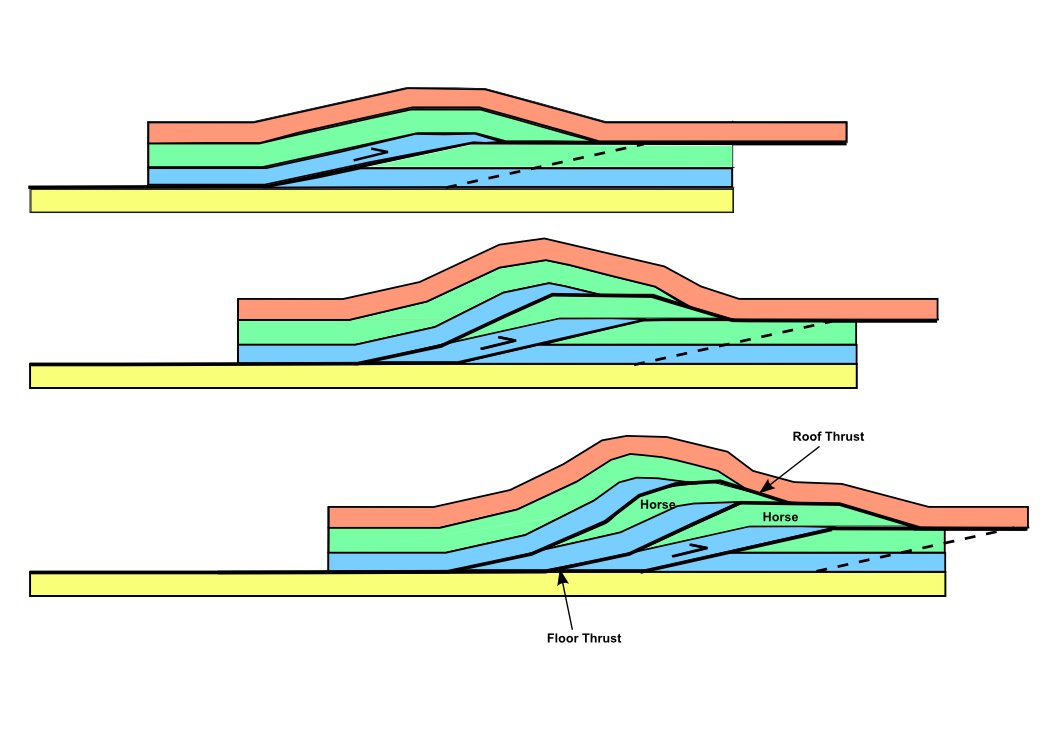
A simple duplex structure showing successive stacking of thrust faults

Present-day geological profile

=== Duplexes ===
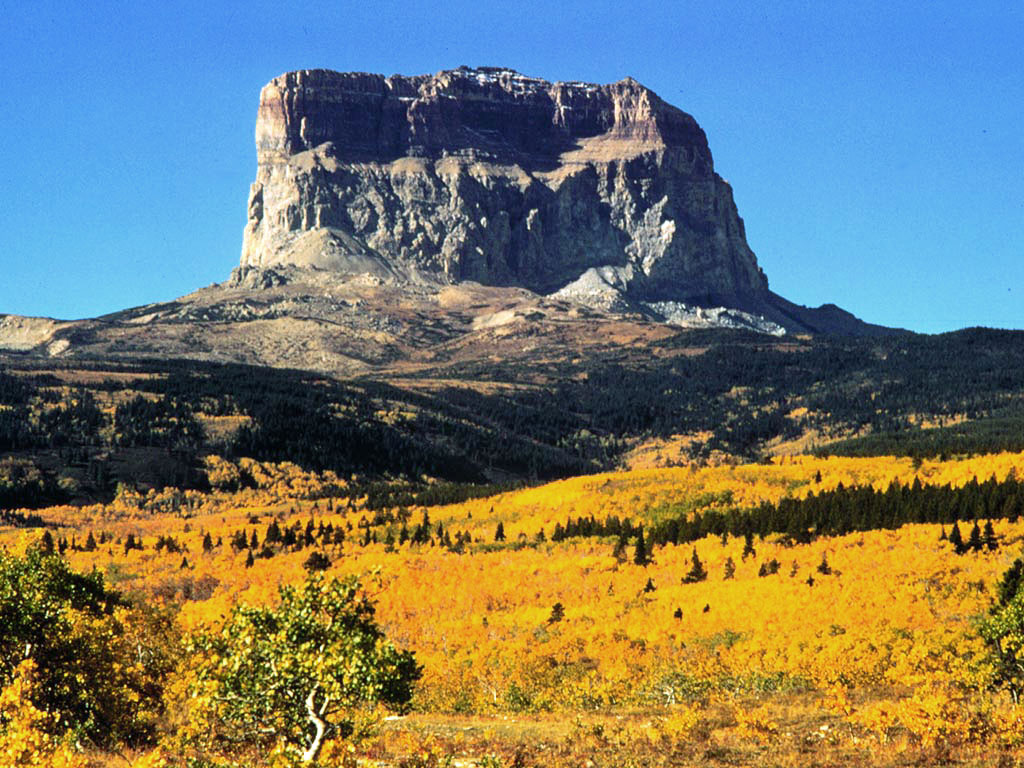
Chief Mountain in Glacier National Park was formed from the eastern edge of the upper plate of the Lewis Overthrust and shaped by erosion.

Thrust faults often associate three types of structures, imbricate fan structures, ramp-flat structures, and duplex structures, all of which are seen within the Lewis thrust and the Rocky Mountain thrust and fold belt. Duplex structures are common and have been located in numerous locations along the Lewis thrust. These structures are distinct due to their structurally overlapping, lenticular stacked thrust fault slices. A prime example is seen in an area that extends from the Kootenay Pass north of the border to Marias Pass found in Montana. This section shows the Lewis Thrust following a series of bedding-parallel detachment horizons with a fairly thin stratigraphic interval near the base of the Purcell Supergroup, which is also the base of the mid-Proterozoic belt. Two windows in this section showing exposures of Upper Cretaceous strata exposed beneath the Lewis Thrust occur adjacent to the Flathead Fault. Within these windows, the Lewis thrust is folded along with overlying and underlying strata in a series of northwest-trending anticlinal culminations that extend the length of the west side of the salient. Furthermore, two distinct structural levels can be seen in this section, an upper level comprising the majority of the mass of the Lewis thrust sheet which is characterized by broad open folds in relatively undeformed rocks, and a fairly thin lower level consisting of stacked imbricate, southwest-facing, sigmoidal thrust fault slices, bounded below by the Lewis thrust, and above by a separate bedding-parallel thrust called the Tombstone thrust. These culminations progressively stack up and accommodate significant lateral crustal shortening associated with the compression along the Lewis thrust fault. Another extremely similar section of this duplexing is seen at another outcrop in the Waterton Lakes area in Southwest Alberta. In addition to duplexes seen in windows, the Lewis thrust also shows isolated remnants of the eastern edge of the upper plate( klippes) located at Chief Mountain in Montana and Crowsnest Mountain in Alberta. Erosion over time has shaped the mountains into their characteristic shape, where they tower over the associated prairies.

=== Geochronology ===
The fault motion of the Lewis thrust is dated based on the oldest age for motion being defined by the youngest sediments on the footwall, which are said to be about 65 million years old. Fission track analysis of uranium-bearing minerals such as zircon and apatite which involves dating the radioactive uranium found in sediments along the Lewis thrust using isotopic ratios of uranium provides constraints of the late pre-deformational paleogeothermal gradient and thickness of the Lewis sheet. This data, after being calibrated into geologic ages, led to the conclusion that maximum burial and heating in the Lewis thrust occurred during the Campanian over a time interval of less than 15 million years prior to the start of movement of the thrust sheet. The apatite fission track data showed abrupt change in paleotemperatures from high to low temperatures and associated changes in uranium concentrations as burial and heating came to a halt and movement and exhumation began, which showed that displacement of Mesoproterozoic strata of the Belt–Purcell Supergroup along the Lewis thrust fault was in motion by approximately 75 Ma. This is supported by locations further south along the thrust fault in Montana where faults on the leading edge cut through a 76 Ma volcanic marker proving that the onset of fault movement must be younger than 76 Ma.

The youngest movement along the fault or in other words, the end of movement for thrust movement is based on the stratigraphic and structural characteristics of early Eocene deposits and is limited by the age of normal faults that cut the thrust and the associated sediments found within these normal faults. Additionally, The cooling of the metamorphic core complexes that arose and were exhumed is said to mark the end of deformation of the thrust belt which was done by using radiometric uranium in zircons to provide a cooling age that is consistent with tectonic transition from compression to extension. U-Pb dating of zircons from various deformed and crosscutting mid-crustal granitic rocks in south-central British Columbia provided cooling ages of 59 Ma. Furthermore, the transition from thrusting and folding to crustal stretching led to rapid cooling of the Priest River metamorphic core complexes where cooling ages found in biotite gave ages of >55 Ma through K-Ar and ^{40}Ar/^{39}Ar dating methods. In addition, the same faults in Montana that cut a volcanic marker were also found to be cut by 59 Ma porphyry dikes. This limits the youngest age for movement to have occurred at 59 Ma. Together, dates revealed for oldest and youngest movement along the fault place the overall movement of the Lewis thrust fault to have occurred over a span of about 15 Ma in the Late Cretaceous to Early Paleocene periods between 75 and 59 Ma.

Paleotemperatures have been derived from vitrinite reflectance by measure of the percentage of incident light reflected from the surface of vitrinite particles in a sedimentary rock from the Upper Jurassic-Lower Cretaceous formation along the Lewis thrust. Results yielded the pre-deformational paleogeothermal gradient to a range of <30 to 11 °C/km compared to 18–22 °C/km during peak coalification and maximum temperatures. These results are indicative that the Lewis thrust sheet succession was overlain by at least 3 km of additional Late Cretaceous strata, along with the 8 km thick succession indicating that the Lewis thrust sheet had an approximate thickness of 12–13.5 km prior to thrust movement.

=== Geologic movement ===
Geophysical methods in the form of seismic analysis has also been used to determine movement along the thrust sheet. In one study, seismic data recorded along the 49°N parallel (the border between Canada and the US) was recorded from the Rocky Mountain trench fault in the foreland belt to the east flank of the Moyie anticline of the Purcell anticlinorium, which is thought to be the location where the Lewis fault tapers off. Seismic data produced showed total displacement of 115 km of the Lewis thrust sheet. This was done by locating the position of the footwall cutoff of the Lewis sheet which is interpreted in the seismic section as truncated reflectors at 11–15 km depth underlying the Purcell anticlinorium and overlying the basement reflectors. 75 km East along the profile is the exposure of the Lewis fault in the Waterton area, which directly links to the most displaced portion of the hanging wall. Measuring the distance between the footwall cutoff and the fault exposure at the Earth's surface, total movement of the Lewis thrust sheet was determined. Results showed that there was 75 km of direct movement of the thrust sheet along the Lewis fault, and an additional 40 km of transport by the formation of footwall-domain duplexes. Although this study did not take into consideration that it could be possible that the Lewis thrust sheet moved further east along the prairies and was eroded away, the data proved to be of high quality as it allowed excellent ties to be made to previous drill holes, mapped structures, measured stratigraphy, and existing geologic and seismic data. This study acted as a reinforcement to previous work and was very consistent with previous data collected. Additionally, this seismic data presented is significant in extensional terms as a direct link between reflectors on the West and East sides of the Rocky Mountain trench correlate to the same stratigraphic unit, where extension can be restored and an extensional distance of about 10 km was calculated by the difference of the pre extension and post extension.

There is controversy over how the overthrust movement occurred and the effect this movement had on the surrounding geology. More specifically, attempting to determine if the thrust movement was continuous or if movement was subject to a more stick-slip style of movement remains inconclusive. However, the anomalously high vitrinite reflectance values obtained from the Lewis thrust at Marias Pass, the McConnell thrust at Mt. Yamnuska, the Coleman fault at Wintering Creek and several others indicate temperatures of 350–650 °C were generated during thrusting. Furthermore, these high vitrinite reflectance values were restricted to extremely narrow sections adjacent to and within the fault zones. This is indicative that the high temperatures were fairly short-lived. Thus, the high temperatures are interpreted to be the result of frictional heating during stick slip faulting. Evidence for the local high temperatures within the fault zone indicate that local areas of frictional stress must have existed, with the possibility of this occurring due to ramps in the fault plane where drainage of high pore pressures may have occurred. Moreover, samples from the hanging wall collected in close proximity to the fault plane show no evidence for heating during progressive burial of sediments. This absence of evidence for heating during faulting is indicative of low frictional stress and therefore, low rates of slip. This shows solid agreement with the evolution of the Canadian Rocky mountain foreland thrust and fold belt, including the Lewis thrust sheet which has been interpreted to have developed and commenced movement in pulses.
