= Waterton Lake =

Lake in the American state of Montana and in the Canadian province of Alberta

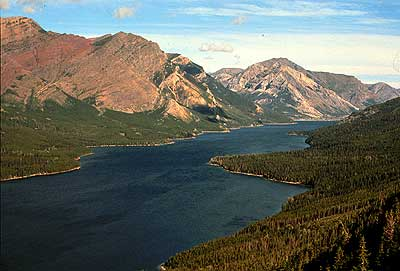
- Seen from Goat Haunt

- Location within Montana Location within the United States
- Location: Waterton Lakes National Park, Alberta, Canada / Glacier National Park, Montana, United States
- Coordinates: 49°00′00″N 113°54′00″W
- Primary outflows: Waterton River
- Basin countries: United States, Canada
- Surface area: 10.1 km^{2} (3.9 sq mi) +1.5 km^{2} (0.58 sq mi)
- Average depth: 80 m (260 ft)
- Max. depth: 150 m (490 ft)
- Surface elevation: 1,280 m (4,200 ft)

Waterton Lake (Blackfoot: Paahtómahksikimi) is a mountain lake in southern Alberta, Canada, and northern Montana, United States. The lake is composed of two bodies of water, connected by a shallow channel known locally as the Bosporus. The two parts are referred to as Middle Waterton Lake, and Upper Waterton Lake, the latter of which is divided by the Canada–United States border, with Canada containing about two thirds of the lake, while the southern third falls in the United States. The Boundary Commission Trail ends at the lake as the last border marker was placed there on 8 August 1874. The United States Geological Survey gives the geocoordinates of 49°03′00″N 113°54′03″W for Upper Waterton Lake. Lower Waterton Lake is north of Middle Waterton Lake and is separated by a channel known as the Dardanelles.

The northern, lower end of the main lake lies in Waterton Lakes National Park, while the upper, southern part of the lake is located in Glacier National Park. In 1979, UNESCO established the Waterton Biosphere Reserve to protect the diverse habitats including prairie grasslands, aspen parkland, subalpine forests, alpine tundra and freshwater fens that surround the lake.

Waterton-Glacier International Peace Park was created by the US and Canada in 1932, and in 1976 it was designated an International Biosphere Reserve. Later, in 1995, it was inscribed as a World Heritage Site by UNESCO.

The upper and middle Waterton Lake system has a surface of 10.1 km^{2} (3.9 sq mi), while the lower lake, which is in Canada only, has 1.5 km^{2} (0.58 sq mi) and lies at an altitude of 1,274 m (4,180 ft). Two soundings of the lake were 210 feet (64 m) and 317 feet (97 m), done in 1910. More recent soundings have revealed a depth of 490 ft (150 m).

Highway 5 has its westernmost point on the shores of the lake.

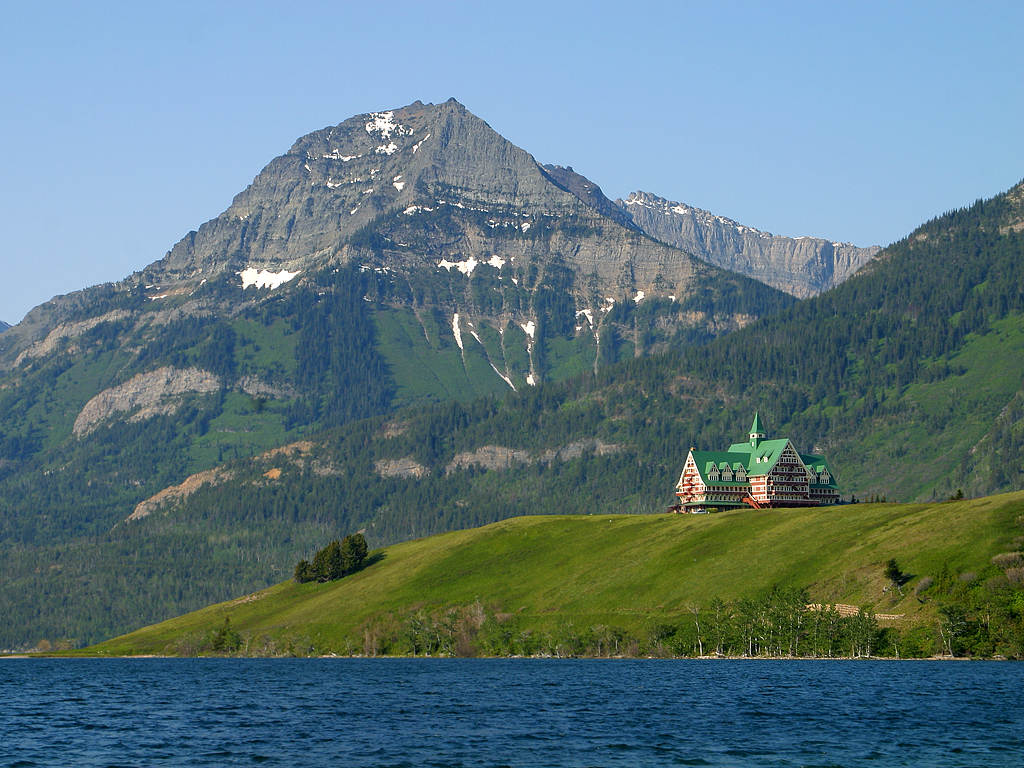
Upper Waterton Lake with Prince of Wales Hotel and Mount Richards

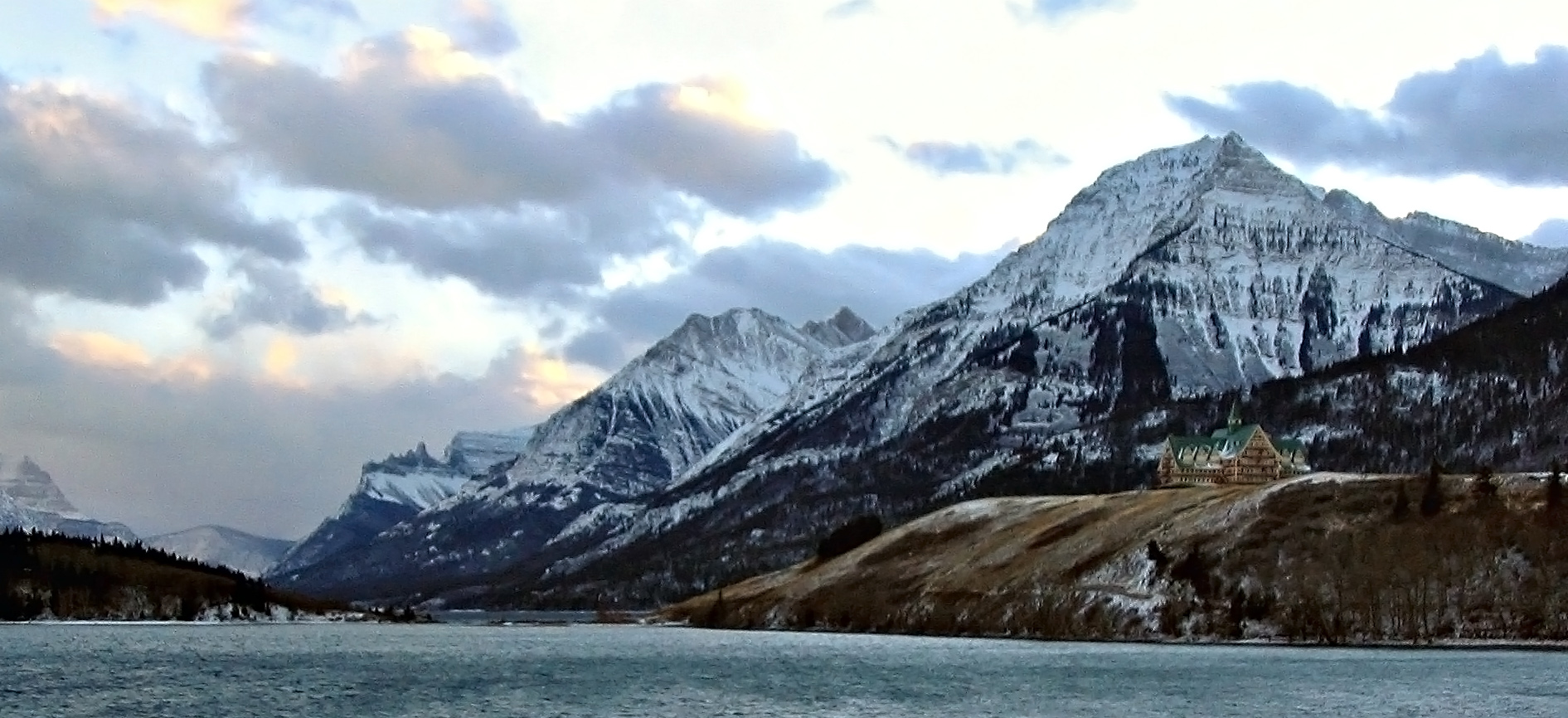
Waterton Lake in winter

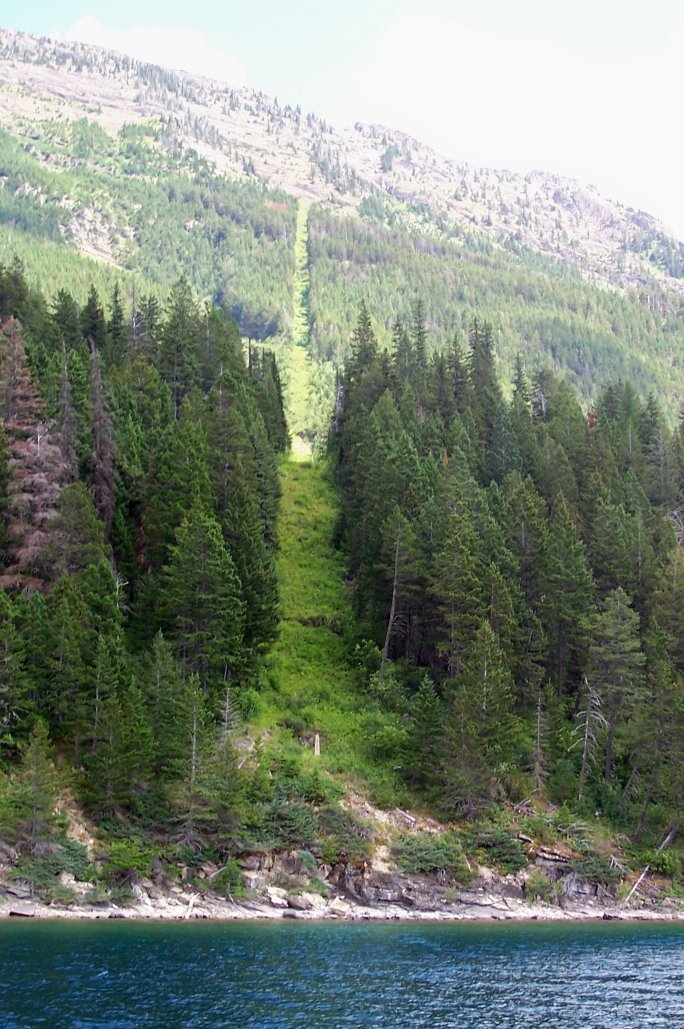
49th parallel north at Waterton Lake

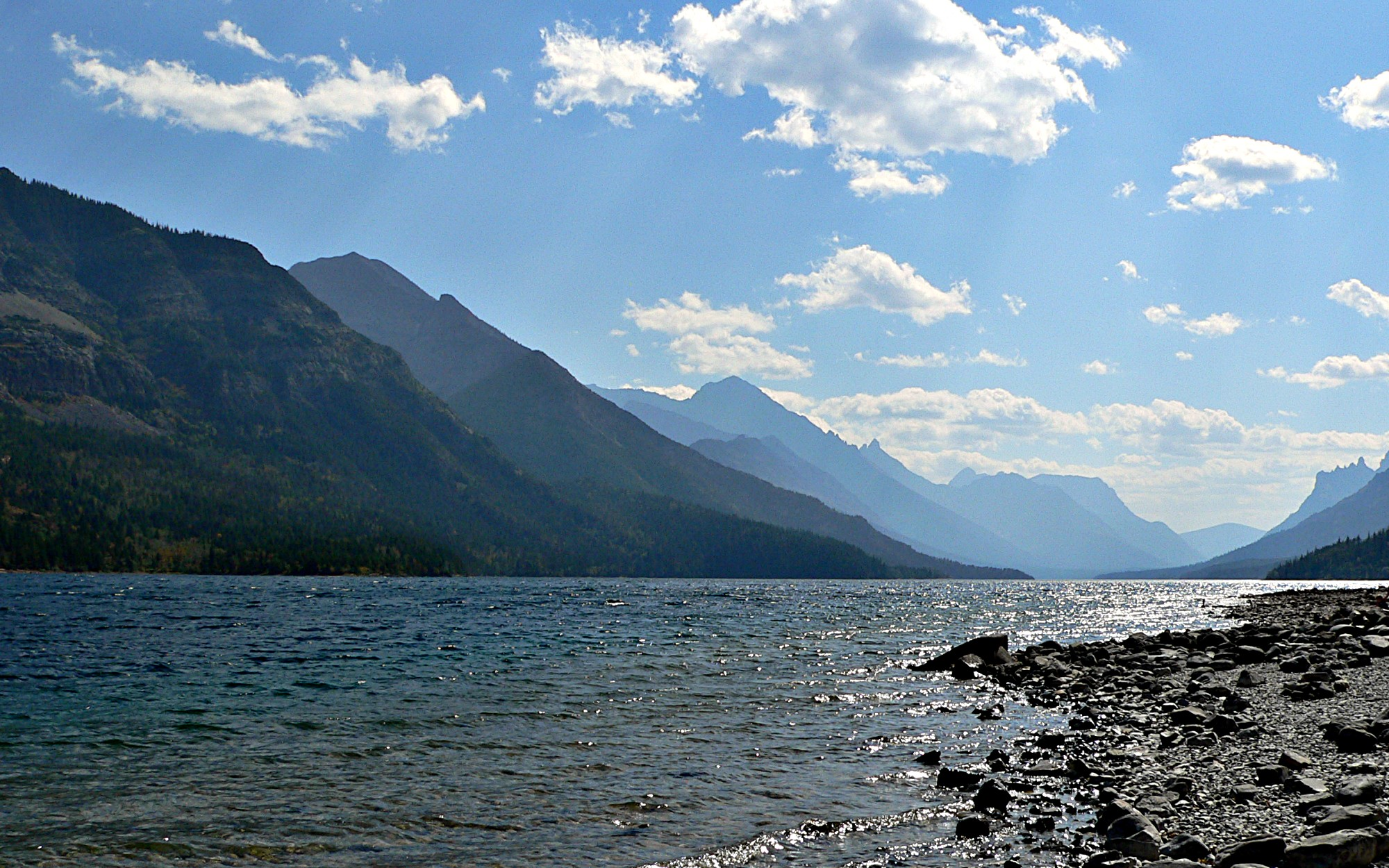
Looking south across Waterton Lake.

== Waterton River ==
The Waterton River is part of the South Saskatchewan River Basin, and the Oldman River Sub-Basin.

Waterton River flows north from the Lower Waterton Lake for approx. 32 km to reach the Waterton Reservoir (Est. 1964) by the village of Hill Spring.

The Waterton Reservoir diverts water of about 20 m^{3}/s to the Belly River just upstream from the Belly's own diversion weir which diverts water to the St. Mary River. The Waterton continues north from the reservoir for approx. 39 km until it reaches the confluence with the Belly River, which is a tributary of the Oldman River.

Waterton River has relatively reduced sediment concentrations due to the lakes and the reservoir acting as a sediment-settling trap.

The total length of the river is 80 km (50 mi).

Waterton River's mean peak discharge averages about 80 m^{3}/s.

Tributaries to the Waterton River include:

- Foothill Creek
- Drywood Creek

- Yarrow Creek

- Dungarvan Creek
- Galwey Brook

- Cottonwood Creek

- Crooked Creek

Waterton Reservoir has a Full Supply Level (FSL) of 1,185.67 metres, and an Irrigation Capacity of 114,334 dam^{3}.
