= Gardner Point =

Mountain in Montana, United States

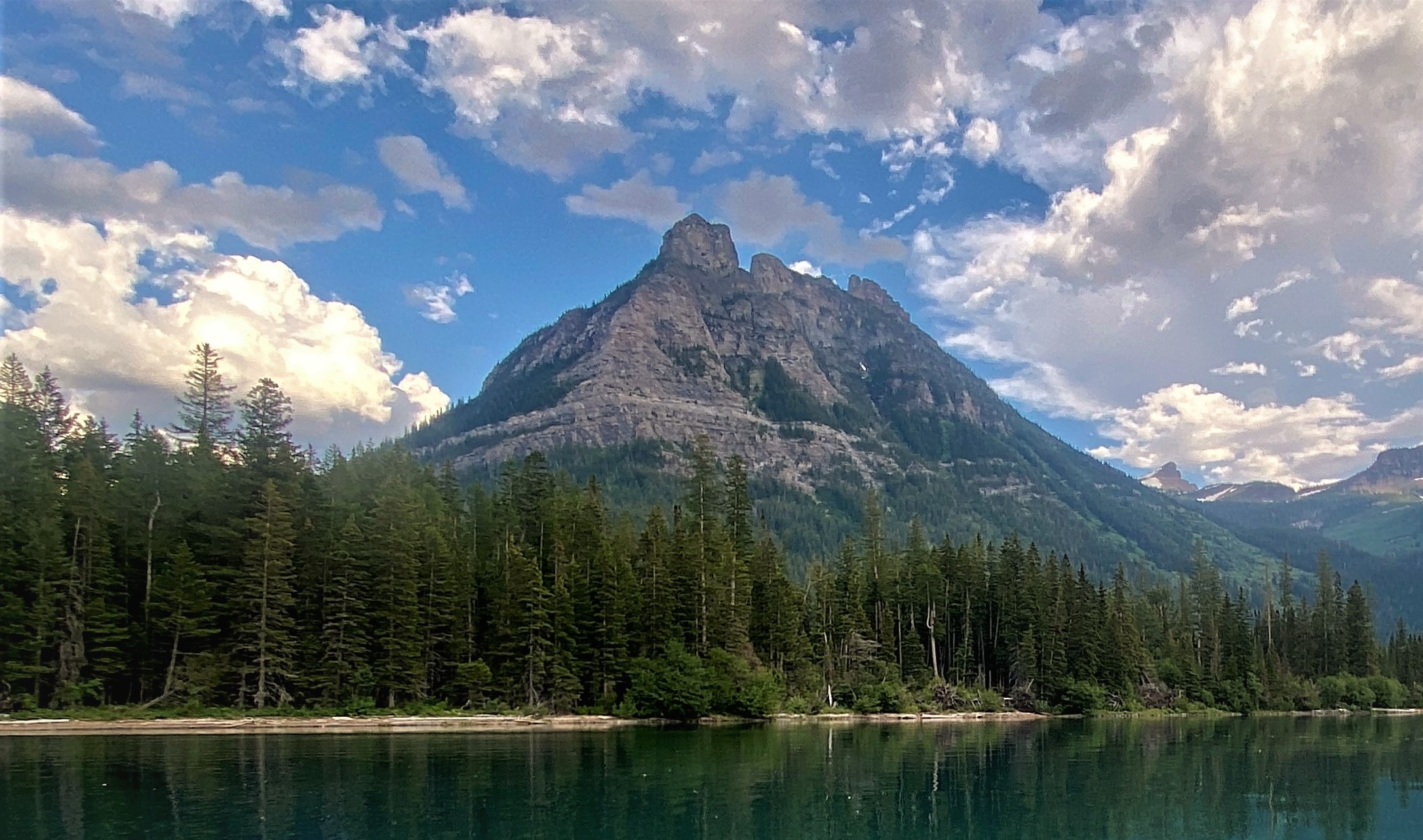
- West aspect, view from Kintla Lake

Highest point
- Elevation: 7,405 ft (2,257 m)
- Prominence: 245 ft (75 m)
- Parent peak: Peak 8201
- Isolation: 1.07 mi (1.72 km)
- Coordinates: 48°58′37″N 114°07′40″W

Geography
- Location within Montana Location within the United States
- Country: United States
- State: Montana
- County: Flathead
- Protected area: Glacier National Park
- Parent range: Livingston Range
- Topo map: USGS Kintla Peak

Gardner Point is a 7,405-foot-elevation (2,257-meter) mountain summit in Flathead County, Montana.

== Description ==
Gardner Point is located in the northwest corner of Glacier National Park. It is set in the Livingston Range, three miles (4.8 km) west of the Continental Divide and 1.5 mile (2.4 km) south of the Canada–United States border. Precipitation runoff from the mountain drains into Kintla Creek which is a tributary of the North Fork Flathead River. Topographic relief is significant as the summit rises over 3,000 feet (910 m) above the eastern end of Upper Kintla Lake in 0.6 mile (1 km). Access to the mountain is via the Boulder Pass Trail which traverses the west slope of the peak. The mountain's toponym was officially adopted on March 6, 1929, by the U.S. Board on Geographic Names.

== Climate ==
Based on the Köppen climate classification, Gardner Point is located in a subarctic climate zone characterized by long, usually very cold winters, and short, cool to mild summers. Winter temperatures can drop below −10 °F with wind chill factors below −30 °F.

== Geology ==
Like other mountains in Glacier National Park, Gardner Point is composed of sedimentary rock laid down during the Precambrian to Jurassic periods. Formed in shallow seas, this sedimentary rock was initially uplifted beginning 170 million years ago when the Lewis Overthrust fault pushed an enormous slab of precambrian rocks 3 mi (4.8 km) thick, 50 miles (80 km) wide and 160 miles (260 km) long over younger rock of the Cretaceous period.

== Etymology ==
George Clinton Gardner (1834–1904) was a surveyor with the International Boundary Survey Commission which surveyed this area. Other nearby landforms near the border in Glacier Park that are also named after members of this boundary survey crew include Mount Custer (Henry Custer), Campbell Mountain (Archibald Campbell), Kinnerly Peak (Caleb B. R. Kennerly), Parke Peak (John Parke), Mount Peabody (R. V. Peabody), Herbst Glacier (Francis Herbst), and Harris Glacier (Joseph Smith Harris).

== See also ==
- List of mountains and mountain ranges of Glacier National Park (U.S.)
- Geology of the Rocky Mountains
