= Mount Crandell =

Mountain in Alberta, Canada

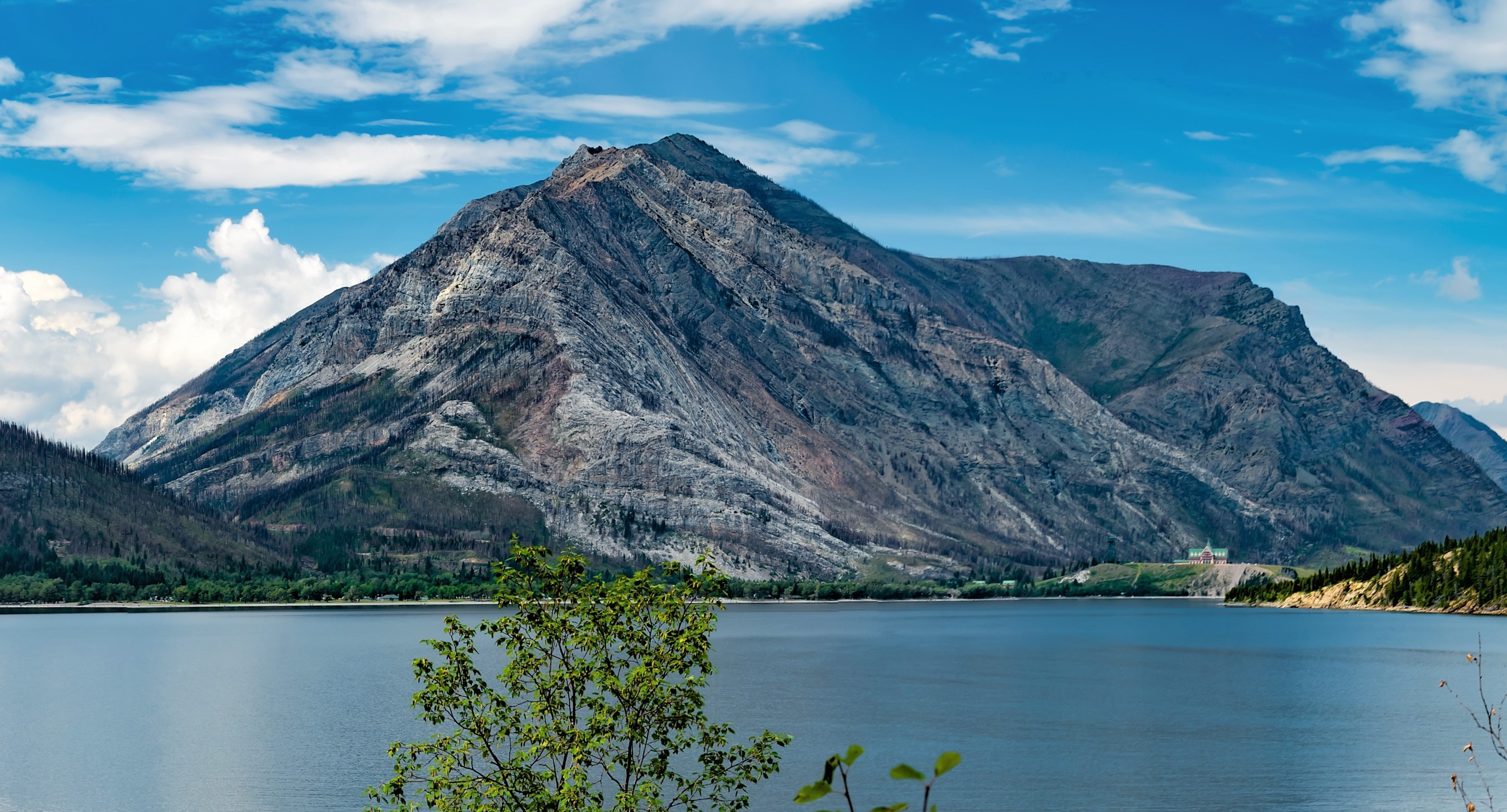
- Mt. Crandell, south aspect

Highest point
- Elevation: 2,381 m (7,812 ft)
- Prominence: 781 m (2,562 ft)
- Parent peak: Mount Blakiston (2932 m)
- Listing: Mountains of Alberta
- Coordinates: 49°04′37″N 113°55′41″W

Geography
- Location within Alberta Location within Canada
- Interactive map of Mount Crandell
- Location: Alberta, Canada
- Parent range: Clark Range; Canadian Rockies
- Topo map: NTS 82H4 Waterton Lakes

Geology
- Rock age: Cambrian
- Rock type: sedimentary rock

Climbing
- Easiest route: Scrambling

Mount Crandell is a 2,381-metre (7,812-foot) mountain summit located in Waterton Lakes National Park, in the Canadian Rockies of Alberta, Canada. It is situated immediately north of the Waterton townsite. Its nearest higher peak is Bertha Peak, 2.94 km (1.83 mi) to the south-southwest.

== History ==
Mount Crandell was named in 1914 after Edward H. Crandell who was one of Calgary's first oilmen.

The mountain's toponym was officially adopted in 1943 by the Geographical Names Board of Canada.

== Geology ==
Like other mountains in Waterton Lakes National Park, Mount Crandell is composed of sedimentary rock laid down during the Precambrian to Jurassic periods. Formed in shallow seas, this sedimentary rock was pushed east and over the top of younger Cretaceous period rock during the Laramide orogeny.

== Climate ==
Based on the Köppen climate classification, Mount Crandell is located in a subarctic climate zone with cold, snowy winters, and mild summers. Winter temperatures can drop below −20 °C with wind chill factors below −30 °C. Precipitation runoff from Mount Crandell drains into Waterton Lake, thence Waterton River.

== Gallery ==
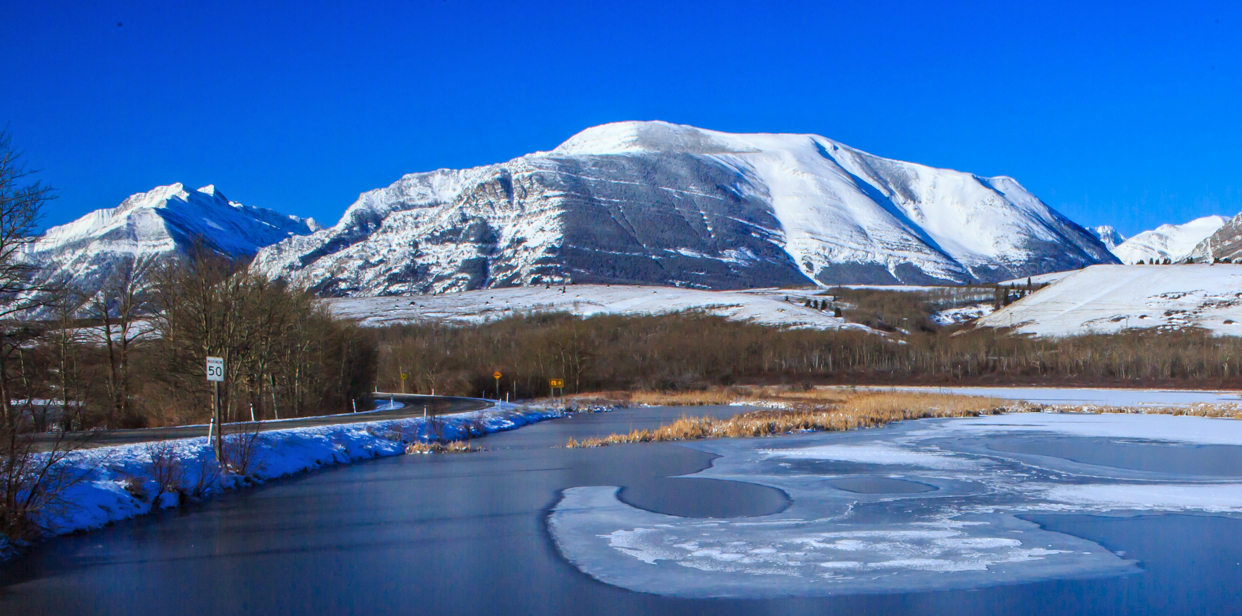
Mount Crandell centered, Bertha Peak to left

== See also ==
- Geology of Alberta
- Alberta's Rockies
