= Mount Richards =

Mountain in Waterton Lakes NP, Alberta, Canada

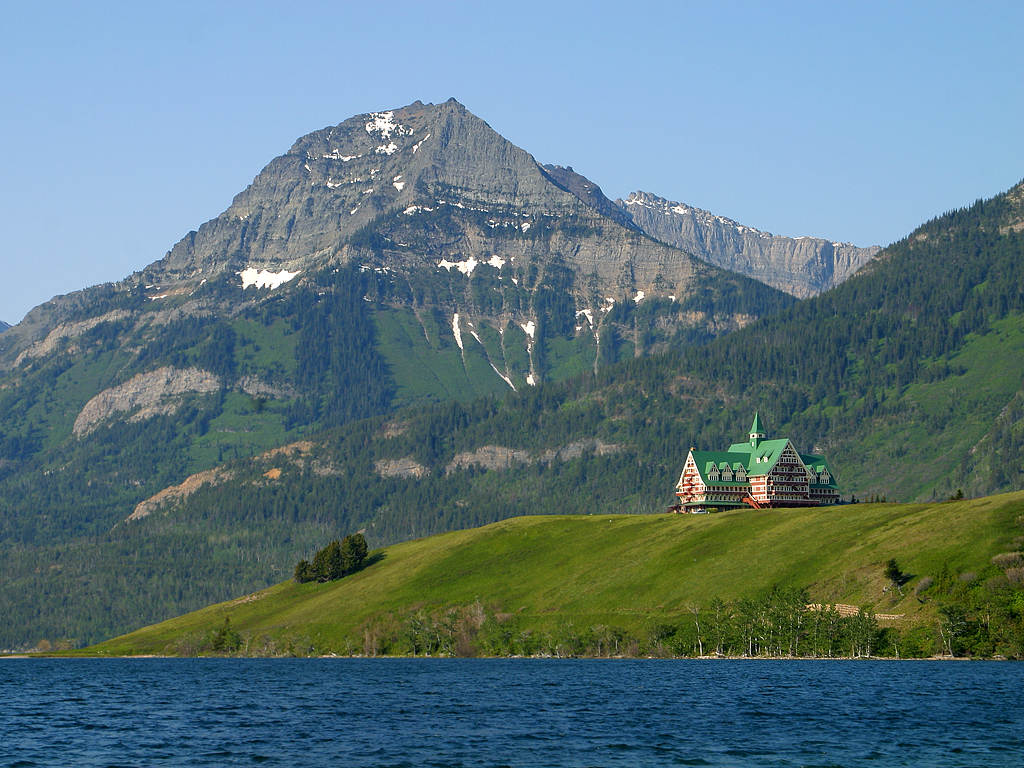
- The northern end of Mount Richards seen with Prince of Wales Hotel

Highest point
- Elevation: 2,377 m (7,799 ft)
- Prominence: 137 m (449 ft)
- Parent peak: Mount Alderson (2692 m)
- Listing: Mountains of Alberta
- Coordinates: 49°00′37″N 113°56′30″W

Geography
- Location within Alberta Location within Canada
- Interactive map of Mount Richards
- Location: Alberta, Canada
- Parent range: Clark Range; Canadian Rockies
- Topo map: NTS 82H4 Waterton Lakes

Geology
- Rock age: Cambrian

Climbing
- Easiest route: Scrambling

Mount Richards is a 2,377-metre-elevation (7,799-foot) mountain summit located in Waterton Lakes National Park, in the Canadian Rockies of Alberta, Canada. It is situated just north of the Canada–United States border, with the south footing of the mountain at Boundary Creek just within Glacier National Park of the United States. Its nearest higher peak is Mount Alderson, 2.0 km (1.2 mi) to the northwest. Bertha Lake and Bertha Peak are situated immediately to the north.

== History ==
Mount Richards was named in honour of Admiral Sir George Henry Richards (1820–1896), Hydrographer of the Navy who was the Second Commissioner of the British Boundary Commission which delineated the border from the Pacific to the Rockies. It has also been called Sleeping Indian Mountain. The mountain's toponym was officially adopted in 1943 by the Geographical Names Board of Canada.

== Geology ==
Like other mountains in Waterton Lakes National Park, Mount Richards is composed of sedimentary rock laid down during the Precambrian to Jurassic periods. Formed in shallow seas, this sedimentary rock was pushed east and over the top of younger Cretaceous period rock during the Laramide orogeny.

== Climate ==
Based on the Köppen climate classification, Mount Richards is located in a subarctic climate zone with cold, snowy winters, and mild summers. Winter temperatures can drop below −20 °C with wind chill factors below −30 °C. Precipitation runoff from Mount Richards drains into Waterton Lake, thence Waterton River.

== Gallery ==
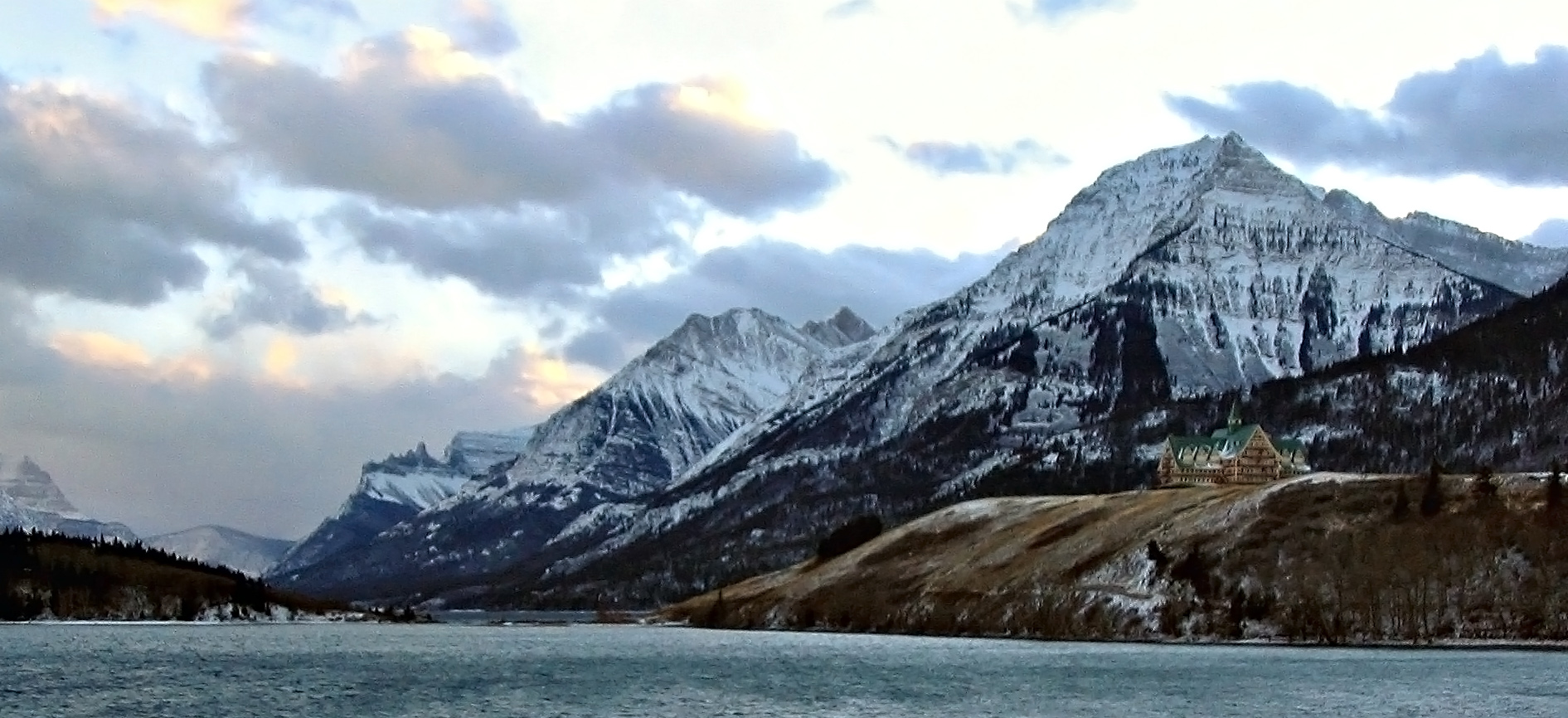
Mount Richards to right

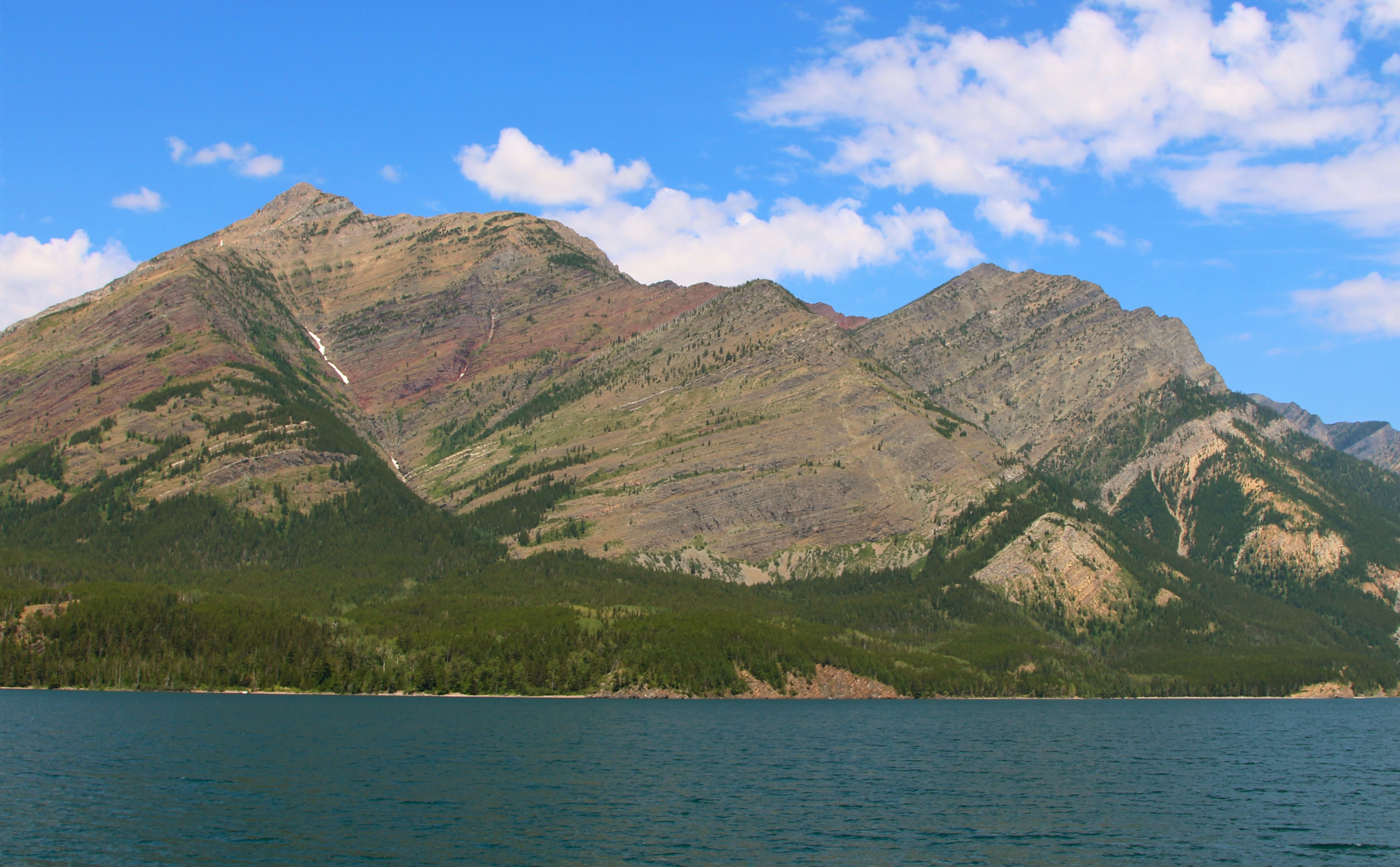
Southeast aspect of Mount Richards

== See also ==
- Geography of Alberta
