= Bertha Peak =

Mountain in the country of Canada

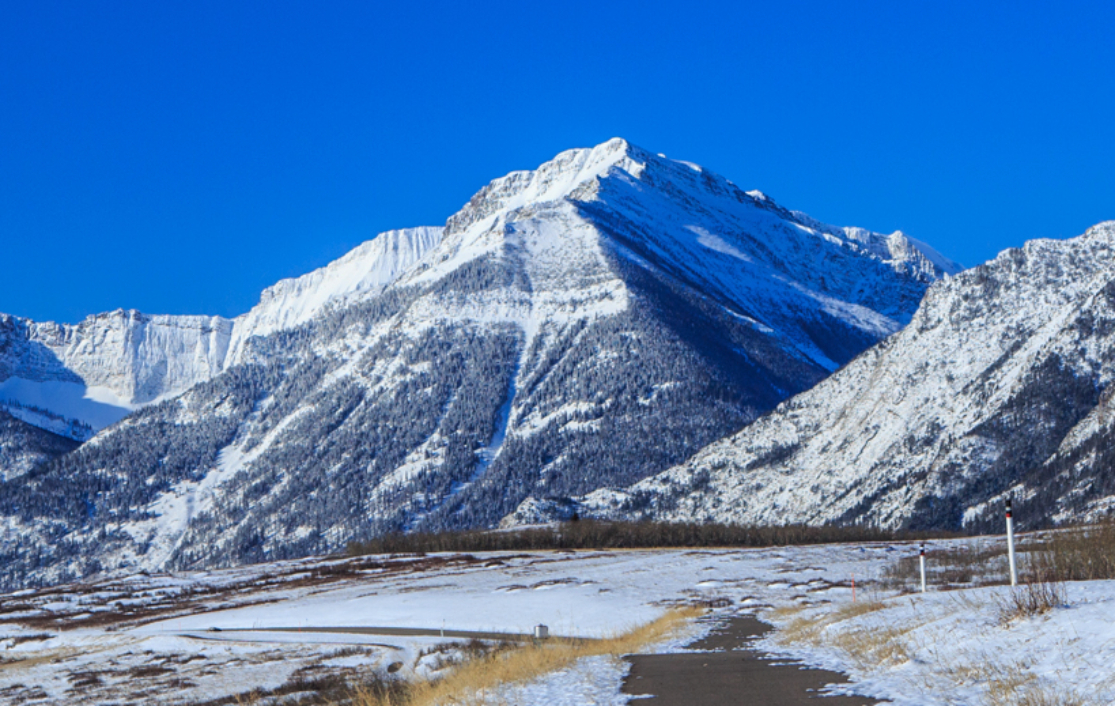
- Bertha Peak, northeast aspect

Highest point
- Elevation: 2,454 m (8,051 ft)
- Prominence: 168 m (551 ft)
- Parent peak: Mount Alderson (2692 m)
- Listing: Mountains of Alberta
- Coordinates: 49°02′30″N 113°56′24″W

Geography
- Location within Alberta Location within Canada
- Interactive map of Bertha Peak
- Location: Alberta, Canada
- Parent range: Clark Range; Canadian Rockies
- Topo map: NTS 82H4 Waterton Lakes

Geology
- Rock age: Cambrian
- Rock type: sedimentary rock

Climbing
- Easiest route: Scramble

Bertha Peak is a 2,454-metre (8,051-foot) mountain summit located in Waterton Lakes National Park, in the Canadian Rockies of Alberta, Canada. It is situated behind the Waterton townsite. Its nearest higher peak is Mount Alderson, 2.0 km (1.2 mi) to the southwest. Bertha Lake lies at the southern foot of the peak, with Mount Richards on the opposite side of the lake. Mount Crandell lies to the north.

== History ==
Bertha Peak was named by Morrison P. Bridgland in 1914 after Bertha Ekelund (1898–1962), a wayward woman and early resident of Waterton who gained notoriety for trying to pass counterfeit money. Morrison P. Bridgland (1878–1948), was a Dominion Land Surveyor who named many peaks in the Canadian Rockies.

The mountain's name was officially adopted in 1953 by the Geographical Names Board of Canada.

== Geology ==
Like other mountains in Waterton Lakes National Park, Bertha Peak is composed of sedimentary rock laid down during the Precambrian to Jurassic periods. Formed in shallow seas, this sedimentary rock was pushed east and over the top of younger Cretaceous period rock during the Laramide orogeny.

== Climate ==
Based on the Köppen climate classification, Bertha Peak is located in a subarctic climate zone with cold, snowy winters, and mild summers. Temperatures can drop below −20 °C with wind chill factors below −30 °C. Precipitation runoff from Bertha Peak drains into Waterton Lake, thence Waterton River.

== Gallery ==
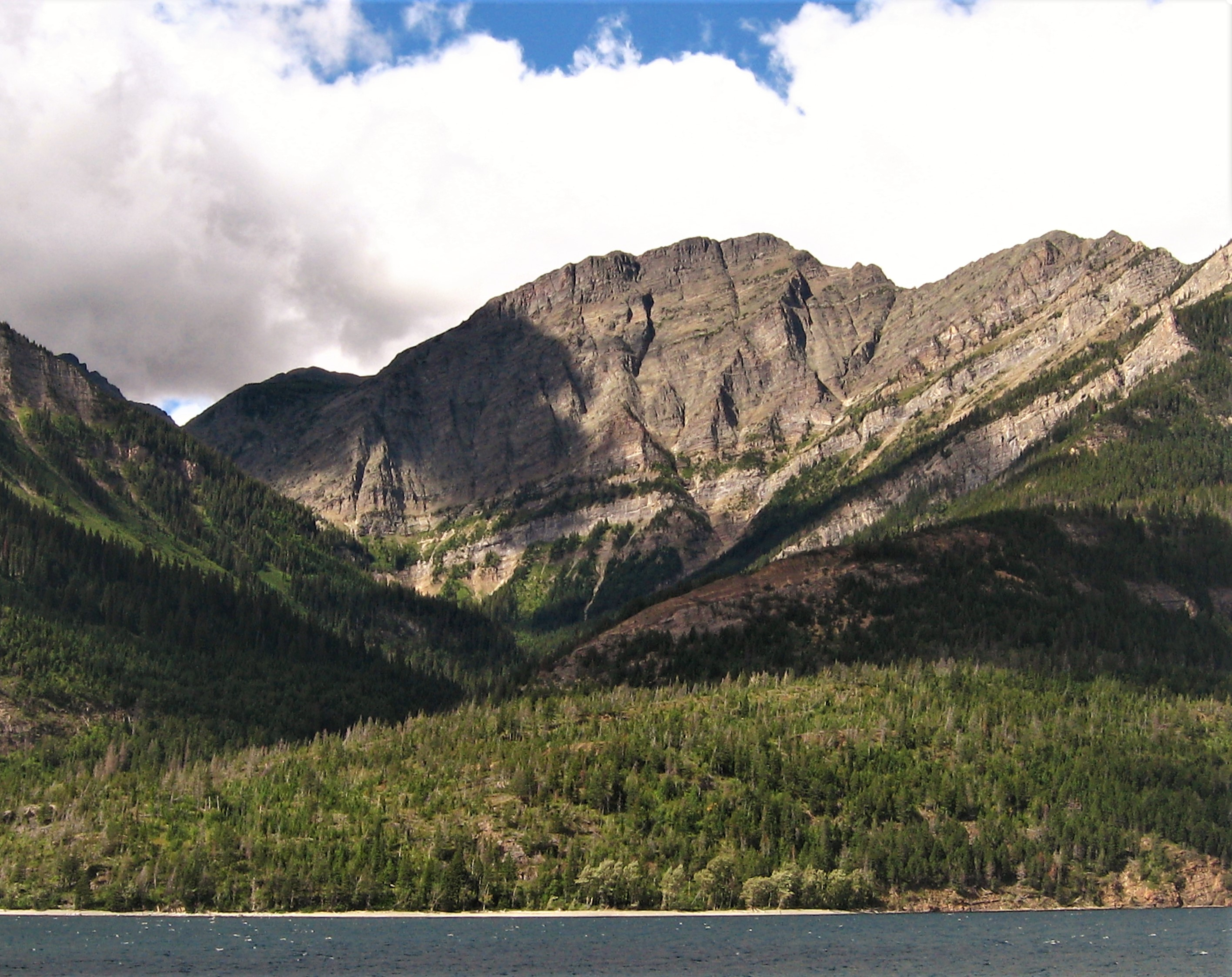
East aspect, from Waterton Lake

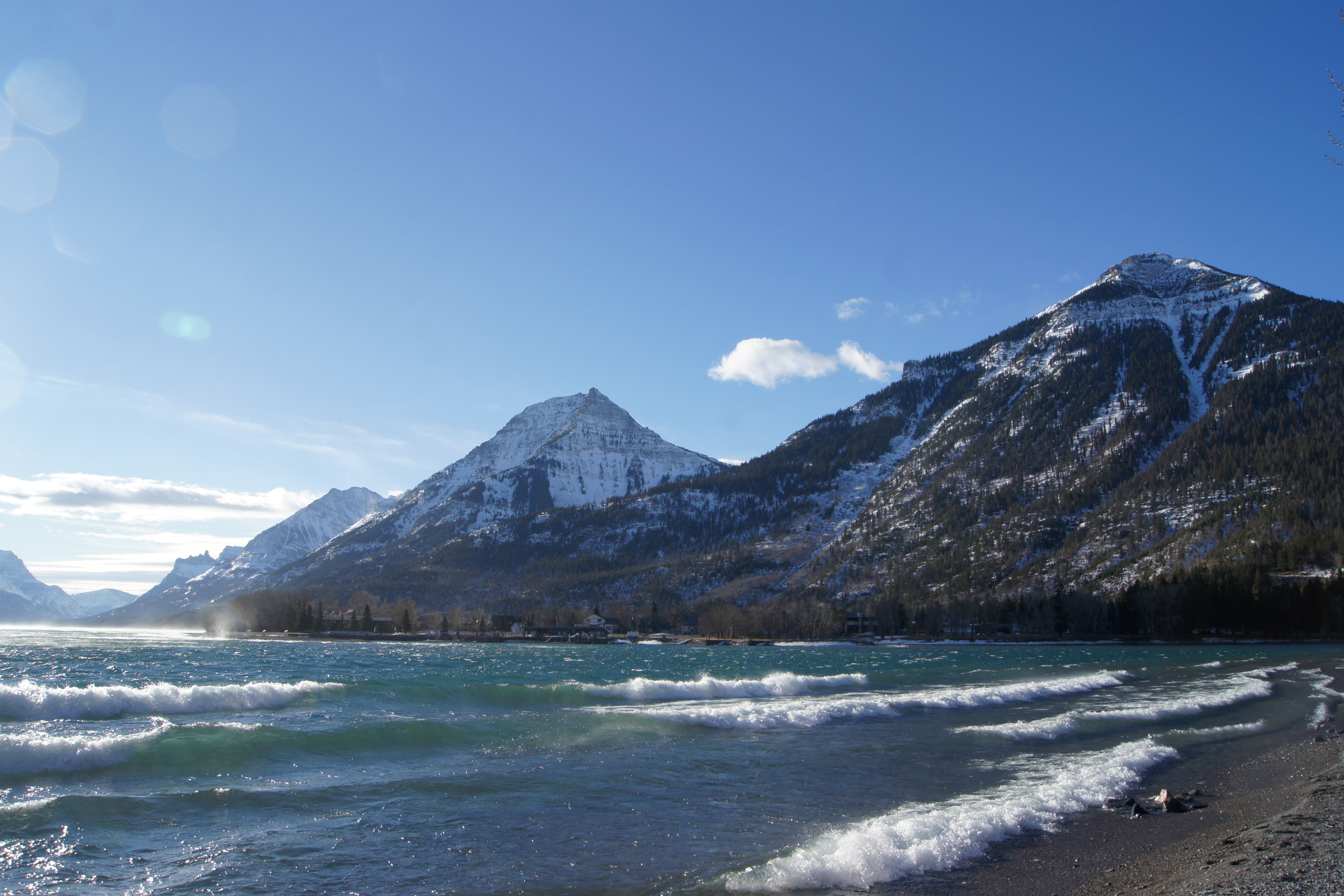
Bertha Peak (right), Mt. Richards (centered)

== See also ==
- Geology of Alberta
