= Prince of Wales Hotel =

Building in Waterton, Alberta, Canada

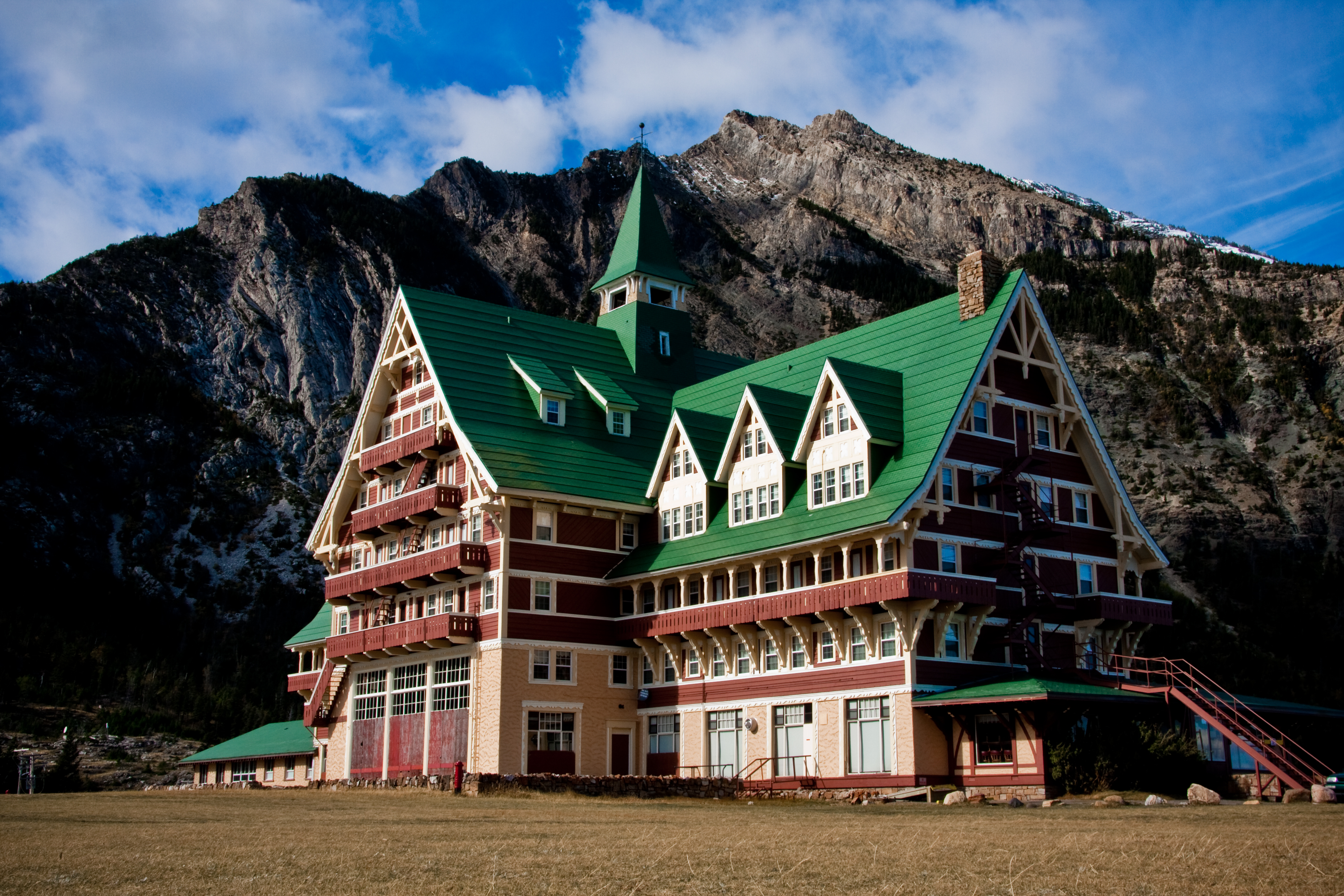
- The hotel from Township Road 13A
- Interactive map of the Prince of Wales Hotel area

General information
- Architectural style: Rustic
- Location: Alberta Highway 5, Waterton Park, Alberta
- Coordinates: 49°03′32″N 113°54′13″W
- Named for: Edward, The Prince of Wales
- Construction started: August 1926
- Opened: 25 July 1927
- Management: Pursuit Collection

Height
- Height: 37 metres (121 ft)

Technical details
- Floor count: 7

Design and construction
- Architect: Thomas D. McMahon
- Developer: Great Northern Railway
- Main contractor: Oland and Scott Construction of Cardston

Website
- www.glacierparkcollection.com/lodging/prince-of-wales-hotel/

National Historic Site of Canada
- Official name: Princes of Wales Hotel National Historic Site of Canada
- Designated: 6 November 1992

The Prince of Wales Hotel is a historic hotel located in Waterton Park, Alberta, Canada. It is within Waterton Lakes National Park, overlooking Upper Waterton Lakes. It was designed by and built for the Great Northern Railway company. It is currently managed by the Pursuit Collection.

The Rustic-styled building was opened in July 1927. It is 37 metres (121 ft) tall with seven floors. The building is considered one of Canada's grand railway hotels, and is the only grand railway hotel built by a company based in the United States. It was named a national historic site of Canada in November 1992.

== Location ==
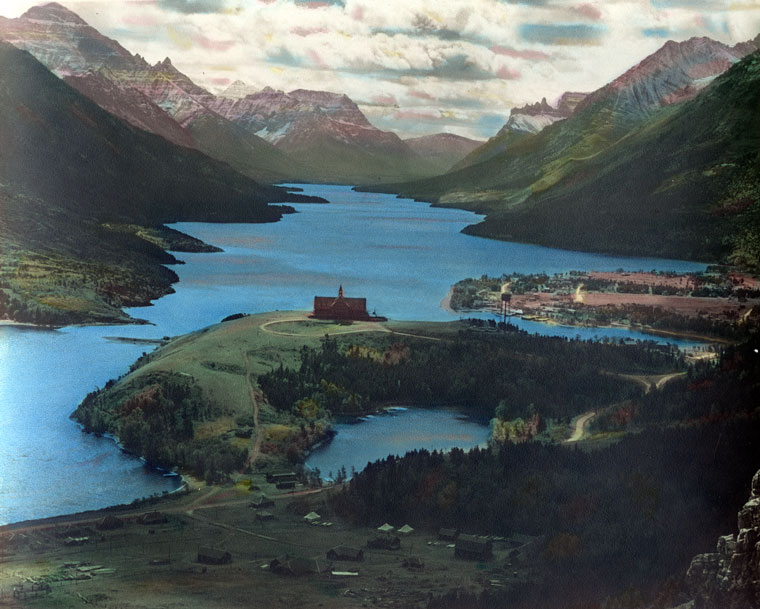
View of the hotel from the northwest. The hamlet of Waterton Park lies further south of the hotel (right).

The Prince of Wales Hotel is on Alberta Highway 5, in the northern sections of Waterton Park, a hamlet within Waterton Lakes National Park. The hotel is adjacent to Upper Waterton Lakes. The hotel property is bounded by a roadway, parkland, and large bodies of water. To the west, the hotel is bounded by Highway 5, the only major roadway to the hotel. To the north and east, varying sections of Waterton Lakes bound the hotel, most notably the Bosporus, a narrow strait that connects the Upper Waterton Lakes with the rest of the lake. South of the hotel lies the Upper Waterton Lakes, as well as the Emerald Bay. The hamlet of Waterton Park lies on the other side of the bay.

The hamlet of Waterton Park, along with the Prince of Wales Hotel, is within the Rocky Mountains, a large mountain range that serves as a continental divide for the Americas. Located within a Canadian national park, the hotel is near several major landmarks and local attractions. Major mountain peaks close to the hotel include Mount Alderson, Mount Boswell, and Mount Crandell. Given the park's ecological traits, the national park was designated a UNESCO Biosphere Reserve in 1979. Waterton Lakes National Park forms a part of a larger international park known as the Waterton-Glacier International Peace Park. The international park is a union between Waterton Lakes National Park, and Glacier National Park, in the United States. The international park is managed by Parks Canada and the U.S. National Park Service.

== Design ==
=== Architecture ===
The Prince of Wales Hotel is one of Canada's grand railway hotels, and the only one built by an American company, Great Northern Railway. The hotel was designed by Thomas D. McMahon, with construction contracted to Oland and Scott Construction of Cardston, Alberta. The design of the hotel was also influenced by Louis W. Hill, the president of Great Northern Railway. Maintaining contact with McMahon, he critiqued designs submitted by McMahon, placing a particular importance of functionality. Aside from functionality, he was a driving force in acquiring pictographs for the hotel from the Kainai Nation. An admirer of the Blackfoot culture, he prominently used native imagery as a marketing tool for his company. Hill was also the first to suggest the installation of power plugs in the guest rooms of the hotel for the purpose of clothes irons and curling irons. The hotel was designated as a national historic site of Canada on 6 November 1992.

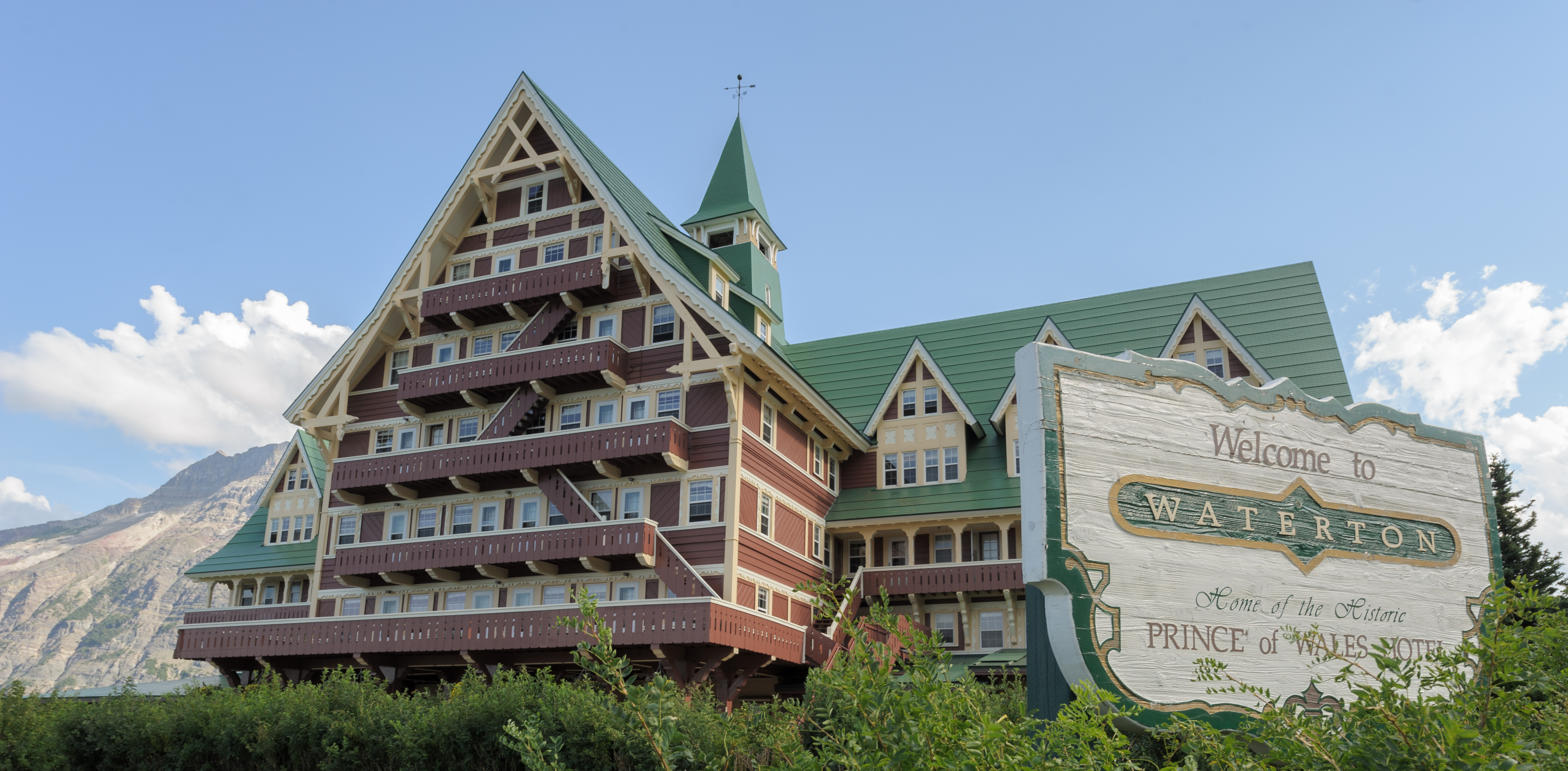
The building was designed in a Rustic architectural style, although it also adopts a number of elements from the Swiss chalet style.

The building was designed in a Rustic architectural style. As a result, the building is primarily made of wood materials for its construction, cladding and detailing. The majority of the lumber was provided by sawmill in Somers, Montana. The Glacier Park Hotel and Many Glacier Hotel were initially used by McMahon as a design template for the new hotel. However, in an effort to place the focus of the room on the nature outside, McMahon designed a lobby for the Prince of Wales completely different from its templates. The lobby for the Prince of Wales Hotel is perpendicular to the length of the building, and incorporates two-storey windows facing Upper Lake Waterton. Other rustic elements within the hotel, including natural wood detailing, and a timber-framed lobby, with open spaces ascending to the building's roof. Wood pillars at the hotel are made of Douglas fir. The building's rotunda features hand-carved posts and beams, topped by queen posts.

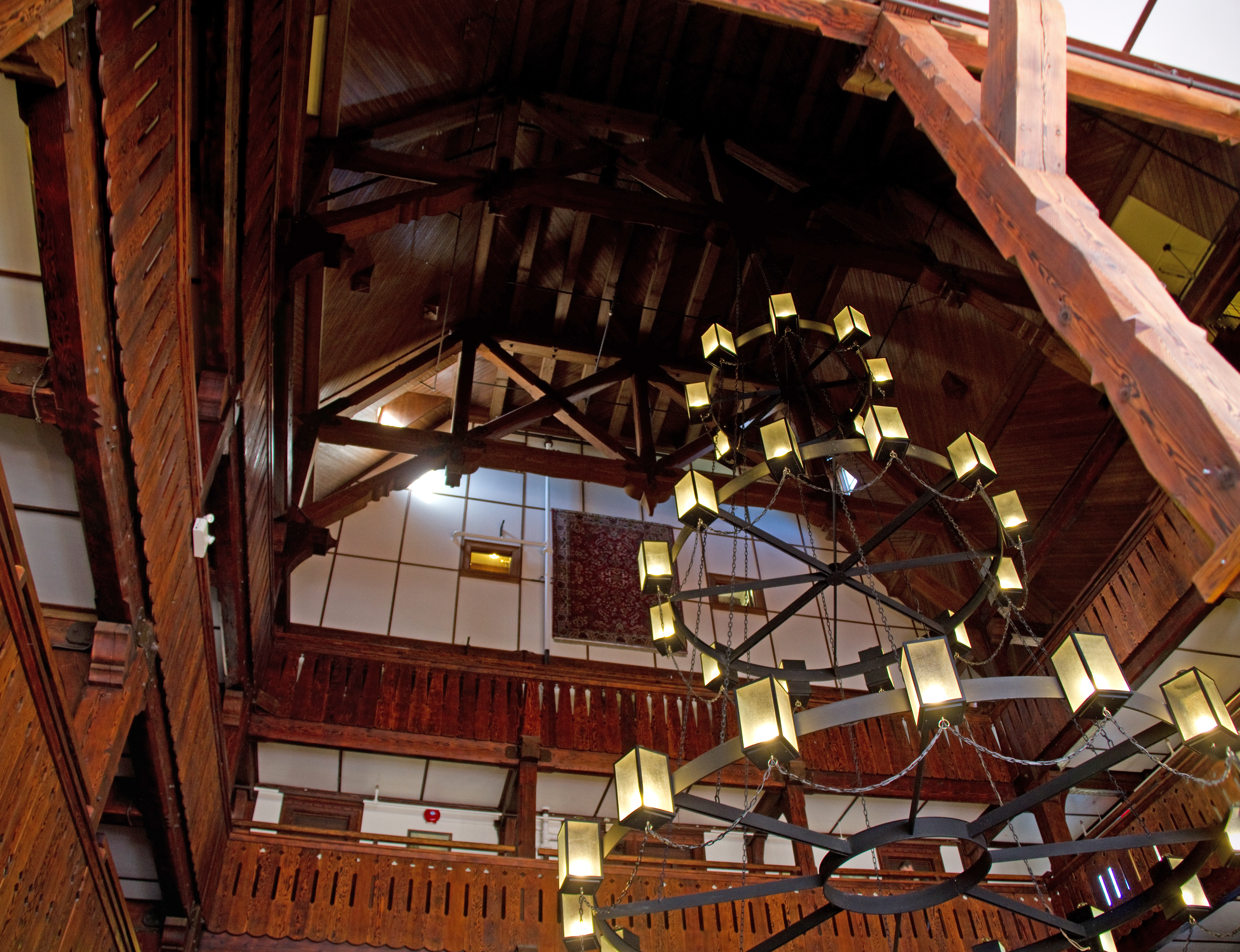
The hotel's timber-framed lobby features hand-carved posts and beams

Early into the hotel's construction, the pace which Oland and Scott's crews worked outpaced the rate at which McMahon could produce new designs. During the hotel's construction, it was reported in the Lethbridge Herald that there was evidence Oland and Scott were only receiving their blueprints when the next stage of construction was underway, and were not always delivered on time. Redesigning the hotel based on the suggestions from Hill, the final plans McMahon sent to Oland and Scott deviated significantly from the original plans they were building off of. The redesign saw the hotel significantly enlarged, with the addition of three storeys for a total of seven floors, increasing the height of the lobby roof and the number of balconies, and added 12 dormers in place the original four gables on the hotel wings. The new designs attempted to save as much of the existing construction as possible, with few design changes made to the first three floors of the building.

The most significant addition in the new design plans however was the addition of Swiss chalet architectural elements to the hotel. The idea to draw upon this style was from Hill, who suggested it to McMahon after his trip to Europe. This includes its tiers of continuous balconies with balustrades, large bracket supports for the balconies, steep pitched gable roofs, intersecting gables, two-storey dormers, a lantern cupola, and its brightly contrasting walls.

=== Facilities ===
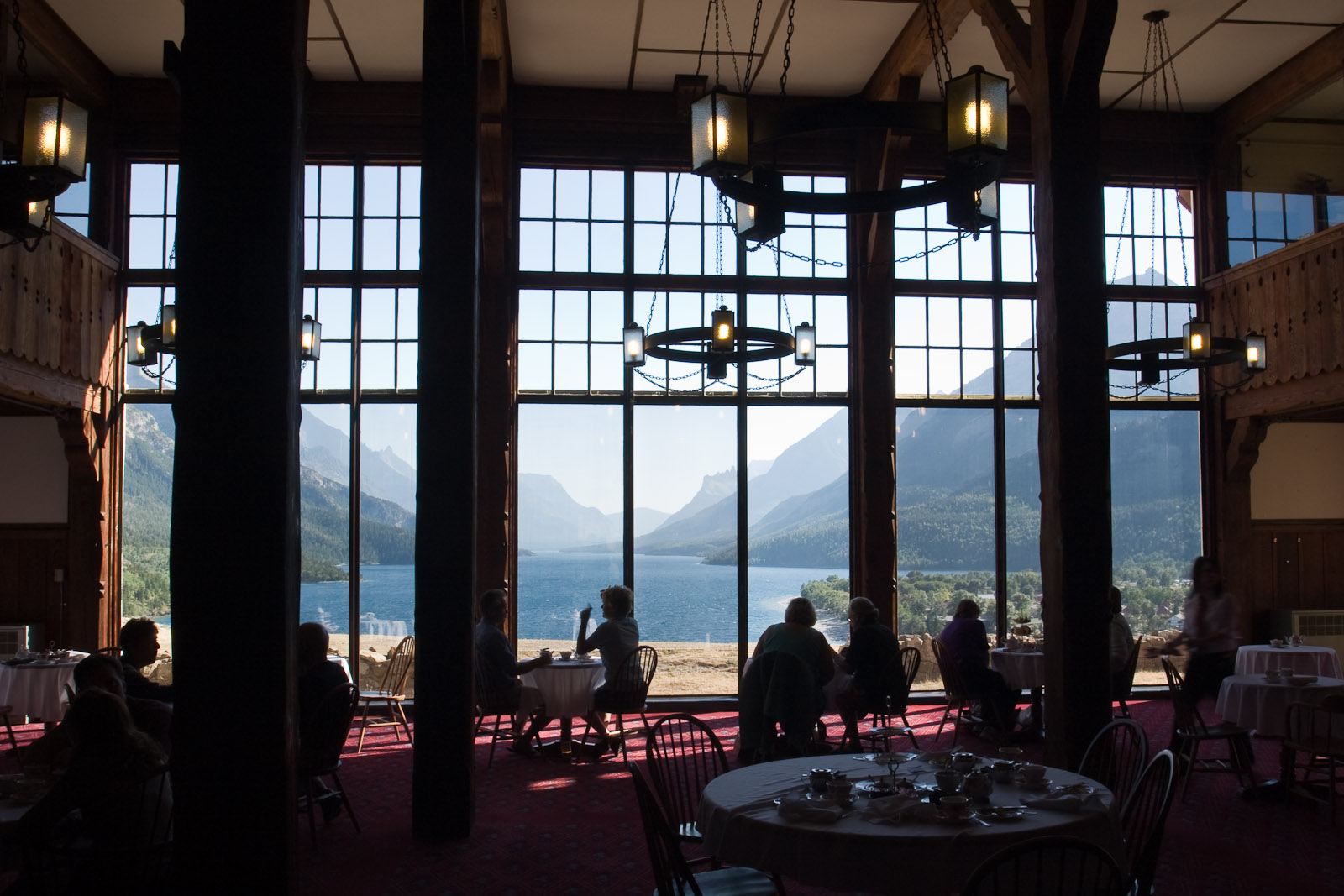
The Royal Stewart Dining Hall features large windows that look over Upper Waterton Lake .

The hotel building houses a number of guest rooms as well as two suites. The hotel also hosts food-services in the building, including the Royal Stewart Dining Hall. The formal dining hall features large windows overlooking Upper Lake Waterton, and hosts the restaurant's afternoon tea. The Windsor Lounge is a cocktail lounge that was carved out of the east wing of the hotel in 1960, replacing the Maple Leaf Lounge. The lounge was placed in the east wing in order to prevent passers-by on Highway 5 from viewing inside the lounge.

== History ==
The hotel was constructed between 1926 and 1927 and was built by the Great Northern Railway of the United States to lure American tourists during the prohibition era. It was named after the Prince of Wales (later King Edward VIII) in a transparent attempt to entice him to stay in the hotel on his 1927 Canadian tour, but the prince stayed at his own nearby ranch instead.

In September 2017, a large forest fire engulfed most of Waterton Lakes National Park, with the fire reached to within about 100 metres of the hotel. However, the hotel remained unscathed, as a team of firefighters from Calgary, Waterton Park, and Coaldale worked for 31 hours to prevent the fire from reaching the hotel by using water pumped from Waterton Lake.

== See also ==
- Royal eponyms in Canada
