= Mount Glendowan =

Mountain in the country of Canada

Coordinates: 49°10′14″N 114°3′1″W

- Location within Alberta

Highest point
- Elevation: 2,672 m (8,766 ft)

Geography
- Location: Alberta, Canada
- Parent range: Clark Range

Mount Glendowan is a summit in Alberta, Canada. Its name comes from the Glendowan Mountains, in Ireland.
