= Anderson Peak (Alberta) =

Mountain in Alberta, Canada

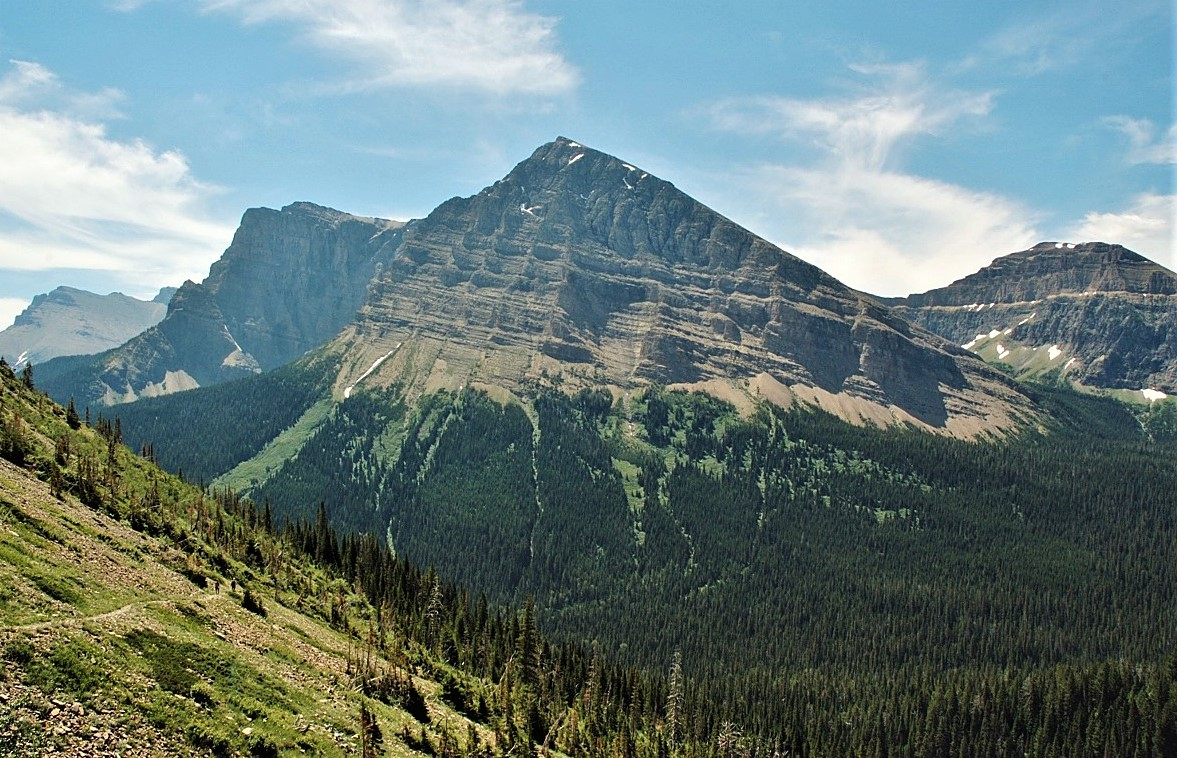
- North aspect

Highest point
- Elevation: 2,685 m (8,809 ft)
- Prominence: 613 m (2,011 ft)
- Parent peak: Mount Blakiston (2,910 m)
- Listing: Mountains of Alberta
- Coordinates: 49°08′04″N 114°04′43″W

Geography
- Location within Alberta Location within Canada
- Location: Alberta, Canada
- Country: Canada
- Province: Alberta
- Protected area: Waterton Lakes National Park
- Parent range: Clark Range; Canadian Rockies
- Topo map: NTS 82G1 Sage Creek

Geology
- Rock age: Cambrian
- Rock type: sedimentary rock

Anderson Peak is a summit in Alberta, Canada.

== Description ==
Anderson Peak is a 2,685-metre (8,809-foot) mountain located in Waterton Lakes National Park of the Canadian Rockies. Anderson Peak was named after Samuel Anderson (1839–1881), a British army surveyor who helped map the US-Canada border. The mountain's toponym was officially adopted in 1928 by the Geographical Names Board of Canada. Precipitation runoff from Anderson Peak drains to Waterton River via Bauerman and Blakiston creeks. Anderson Peak is more notable for its steep rise above local terrain than for its absolute elevation as topographic relief is significant with the summit rising 1,125 meters (3,691 ft) above Bauerman Creek in 1.5 km (0.93 mi).

== Geology ==
Like other mountains in Waterton Lakes National Park, Anderson Peak is composed of sedimentary rock laid down during the Precambrian to Jurassic periods. Formed in shallow seas, this sedimentary rock was pushed east and over the top of younger Cretaceous period rock during the Laramide orogeny.

== Climate ==
Based on the Köppen climate classification, Anderson Peak is located in a subarctic climate zone with cold, snowy winters, and mild summers. Winter temperatures can drop below −20 °C with wind chill factors below −30 °C.

== See also ==
- Geology of Alberta
