= Long Knife Peak =

Mountain in the state of Montana

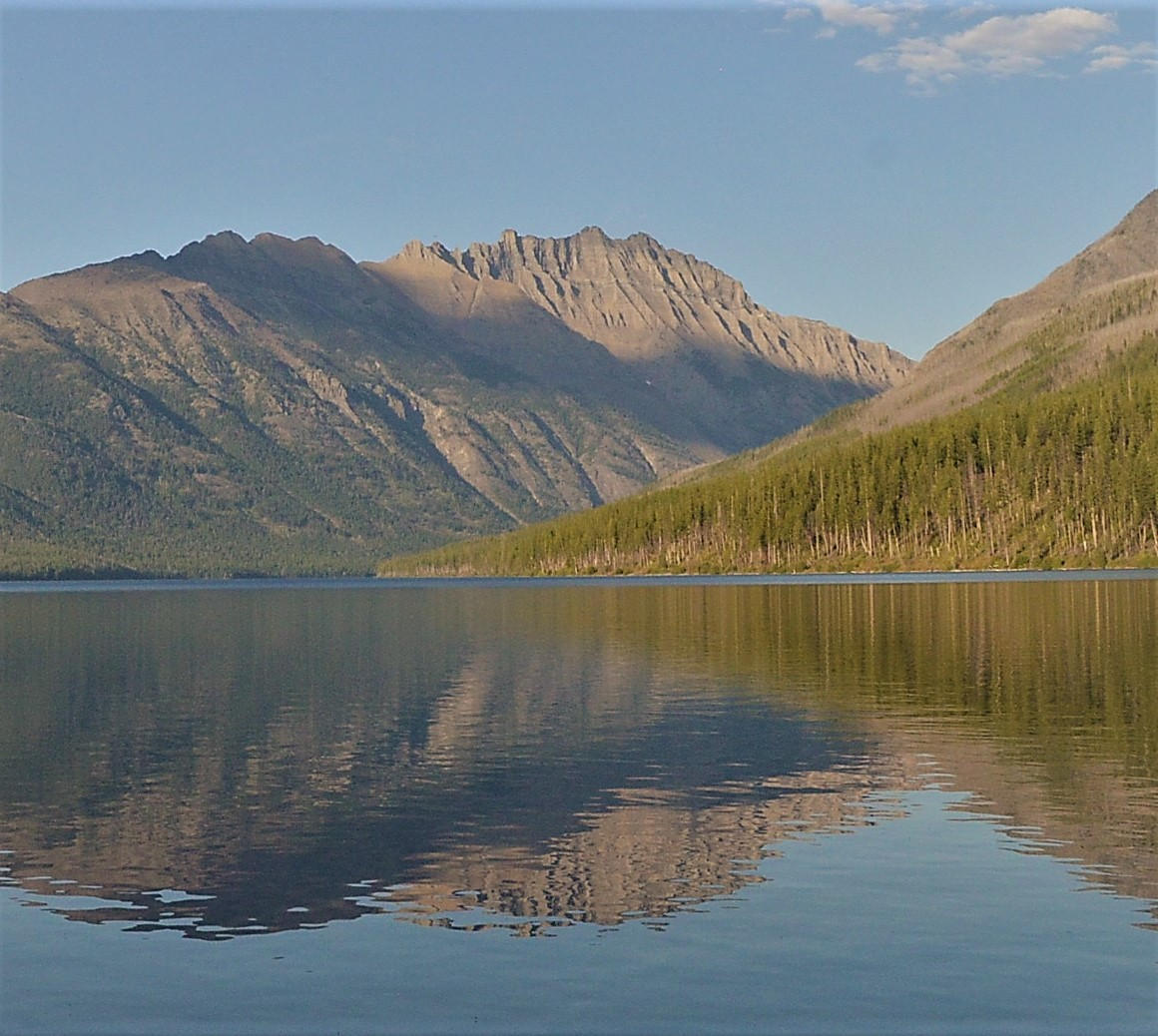
- Long Knife Peak reflected in Kintla Lake

Highest point
- Elevation: 9,789 ft (2,984 m)
- Prominence: 2,501 ft (762 m)
- Parent peak: Kintla Peak
- Coordinates: 48°59′50″N 114°12′28″W

Geography
- Location within Montana Location within the United States
- Location: Flathead County, Montana, U.S.
- Parent range: Clark Range
- Topo map(s): USGS Kintla Peak, MT

Long Knife Peak (9,789 feet (2,984 m)) is located in the Clark Range, Glacier National Park in the U.S. state of Montana. Though much of the mountain slopes extend into the Canadian Province of British Columbia, the main summit is in the U.S. Long Knife Peak rises more than a vertical 1 mile (1.6 km) above Upper Kintla Lake. It is also the most northerly peak and land area in the contiguous United States above 9,000 feet (2,743 m). Long Knife Peak is on an east west ridgeline identified as the "Boundary Mountains" on the USGS 7.5 minute topo quad and this extended ridge, with peak 8864, also contains the most northerly named (numbered) peak and land area in the contiguous United States above 8,000 feet (2,438 m).

== Climate ==
Based on the Köppen climate classification, Long Knife Peak is located in an alpine subarctic climate zone characterized by long, usually very cold winters, and short, cool to mild summers. Temperatures can drop below −10 °F with wind chill factors below −30 °F.

The summit of Long Knife Peak has a tundra climate (Köppen ET) or an Alpine climate.

Climate data for Long Knife Peak 48.9984 N, 114.2170 W, Elevation: 8,944 ft (2,726 m) (1991–2020 normals)
Month	Jan	Feb	Mar	Apr	May	Jun	Jul	Aug	Sep	Oct	Nov	Dec	Year
Mean daily maximum °F (°C)	21.4 (−5.9)	21.5 (−5.8)	25.1 (−3.8)	31.1 (−0.5)	40.3 (4.6)	47.5 (8.6)	58.1 (14.5)	58.8 (14.9)	50.6 (10.3)	37.2 (2.9)	25.3 (−3.7)	20.2 (−6.6)	36.4 (2.5)
Daily mean °F (°C)	15.4 (−9.2)	14.5 (−9.7)	17.2 (−8.2)	22.6 (−5.2)	31.1 (−0.5)	37.7 (3.2)	47.0 (8.3)	47.4 (8.6)	39.7 (4.3)	28.8 (−1.8)	19.5 (−6.9)	14.3 (−9.8)	27.9 (−2.2)
Mean daily minimum °F (°C)	9.4 (−12.6)	7.5 (−13.6)	9.3 (−12.6)	14.1 (−9.9)	21.9 (−5.6)	27.8 (−2.3)	36.0 (2.2)	35.9 (2.2)	28.9 (−1.7)	20.5 (−6.4)	13.7 (−10.2)	8.4 (−13.1)	19.5 (−7.0)
Average precipitation inches (mm)	9.85 (250)	7.51 (191)	8.52 (216)	6.50 (165)	6.41 (163)	8.19 (208)	2.70 (69)	2.65 (67)	4.57 (116)	7.00 (178)	9.96 (253)	8.97 (228)	82.83 (2,104)
Source: PRISM Climate Group

== See also ==
- List of mountains and mountain ranges of Glacier National Park (U.S.)

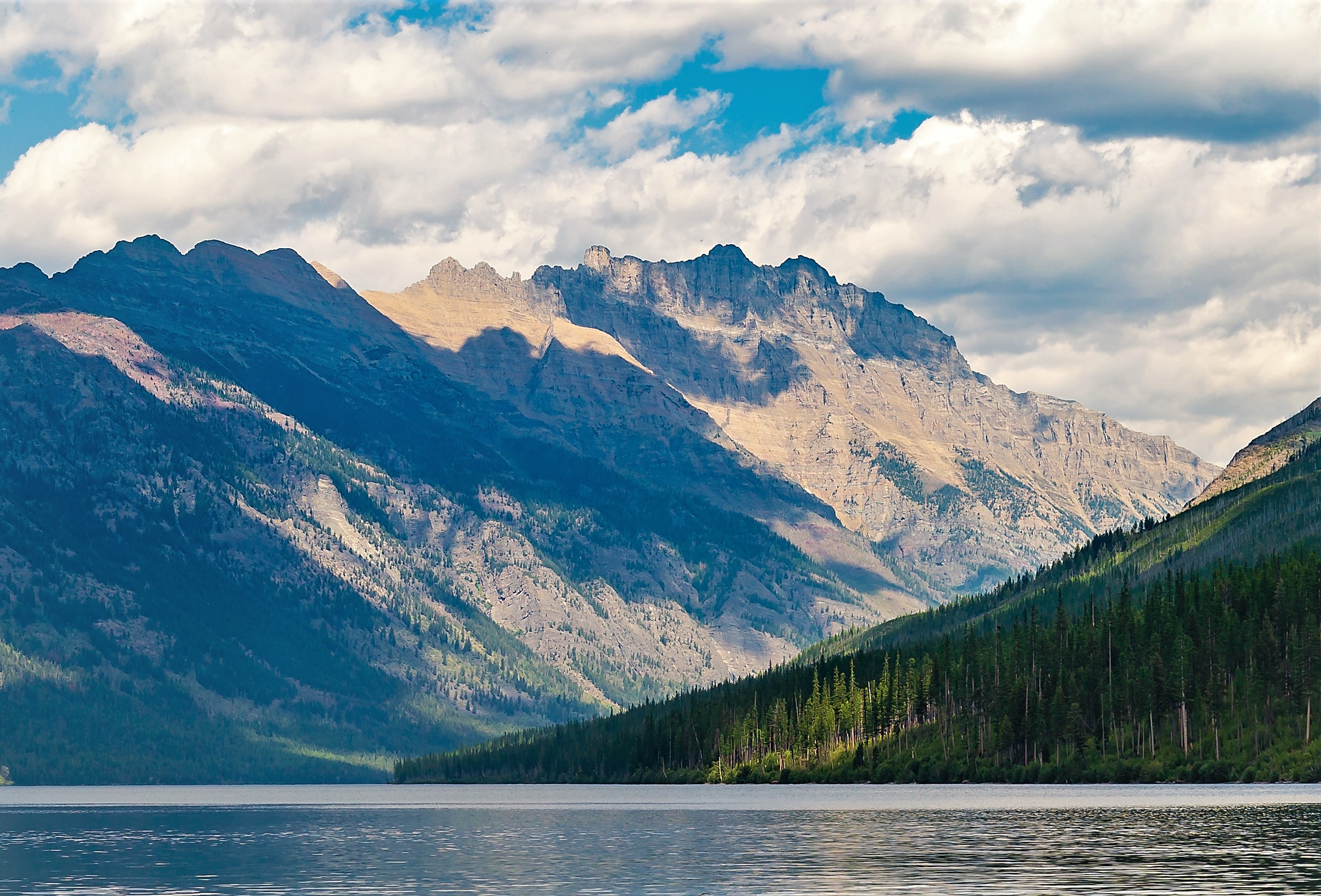
Long Knife Peak from Kintla Lake
