= Mount Matkin =

Mountain in Alberta and British Columbia, Canada

- Location within Alberta Location within British Columbia Location within Canada

Highest point
- Elevation: 2,410 m (7,910 ft)
- Prominence: 365 m (1,198 ft)
- Coordinates: 49°11′20″N 114°13′22″W

Geography
- Location: Alberta / British Columbia, Canada
- Parent range: Clark Range
- Topo map: NTS 82G1 Sage Creek

Mount Matkin is a Canadian mountain located on the border of Alberta and British Columbia on the Continental Divide. It was named after Sergeant Philip K Matkin of the Royal Canadian Air Force.

== See also ==
- List of peaks on the Alberta–British Columbia border
- Mountains of Alberta
- Mountains of British Columbia
