= Mount Hawkins =

Mountain in Alberta, Canada

- Location within Alberta Location within Canada

Highest point
- Elevation: 2,683 m (8,802 ft)
- Prominence: 173 m (568 ft)
- Isolation: 2.9 km (1.8 mi)
- Coordinates: 49°05′15″N 114°04′37″W

Geography
- Country: Canada
- Province: Alberta
- Protected area: Waterton Lakes National Park
- Parent range: Clark Range; Canadian Rockies
- Topo map: NTS 82G1 Sage Creek

Mount Hawkins is a summit in Waterton Lakes National Park of Alberta, Canada.

Mount Hawkins was named after J. S. Hawkins, a government surveyor.
