= Font Mountain =

Mountain in Canadian Rockies

- Location within Alberta Location within British Columbia Location within Canada

Highest point
- Elevation: 2,353 m (7,720 ft)
- Prominence: 213 m (699 ft)
- Listing: Mountains of Alberta
- Coordinates: 49°10′30″N 114°12′48″W

Geography
- Country: Canada
- Provinces: Alberta and British Columbia
- Parent range: Clark Range
- Topo map: NTS 82G1 Sage Creek

Font Mountain is located on the border of Alberta and British Columbia on the Continental Divide.

== See also ==
- List of peaks on the Alberta–British Columbia border
- Mountains of British Columbia
