= Mount Peabody =

Mountain in Montana, United States

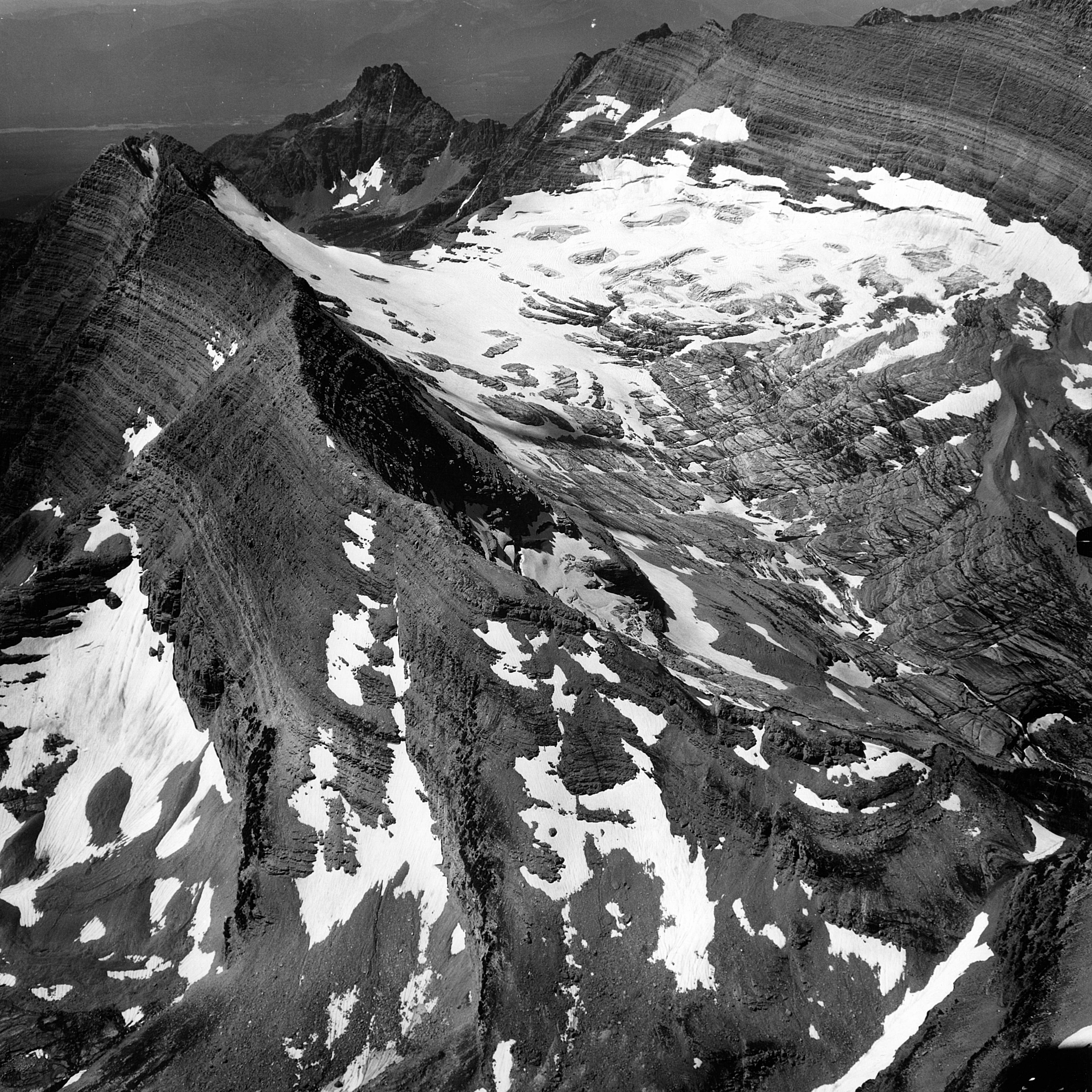
- Mt. Peabody (left) and Agassiz Glacier in 1961; Aerial view from the Northeast

Highest point
- Elevation: 9,221 ft (2,811 m)
- Prominence: 1,386 ft (422 m)
- Coordinates: 48°55′47″N 114°08′26″W

Geography
- Location within Montana Location within the United States
- Location: Flathead County, Montana, U.S.
- Parent range: Livingston Range
- Topo map(s): USGS Kintla Peak, MT

Climbing
- First ascent: 1978 (DeSanto, Ellington, Sigler)

Mount Peabody (9,221 feet (2,811 m)) is located in the Livingston Range, Glacier National Park in the U.S. state of Montana. Agassiz Glacier is located on the western slopes of Mount Peabody.

== See also ==
- List of mountains and mountain ranges of Glacier National Park (U.S.)
