= Kenow Mountain =

Mountain in British Columbia, Canada

- Location within British Columbia

Highest point
- Elevation: 2,697 m (8,848 ft)
- Prominence: 783 m (2,569 ft)
- Listing: Mountains of British Columbia
- Coordinates: 49°04′41″N 114°19′23″W

Geography
- Location: British Columbia, Canada
- District: Kootenay Land District
- Parent range: Clark Range
- Topo map: NTS 82G1 Sage Creek

Kenow Mountain is located in the Clark Range in the Flathead drainage of British Columbia.
