= Mount Blakiston =

Mountain in Alberta, Canada

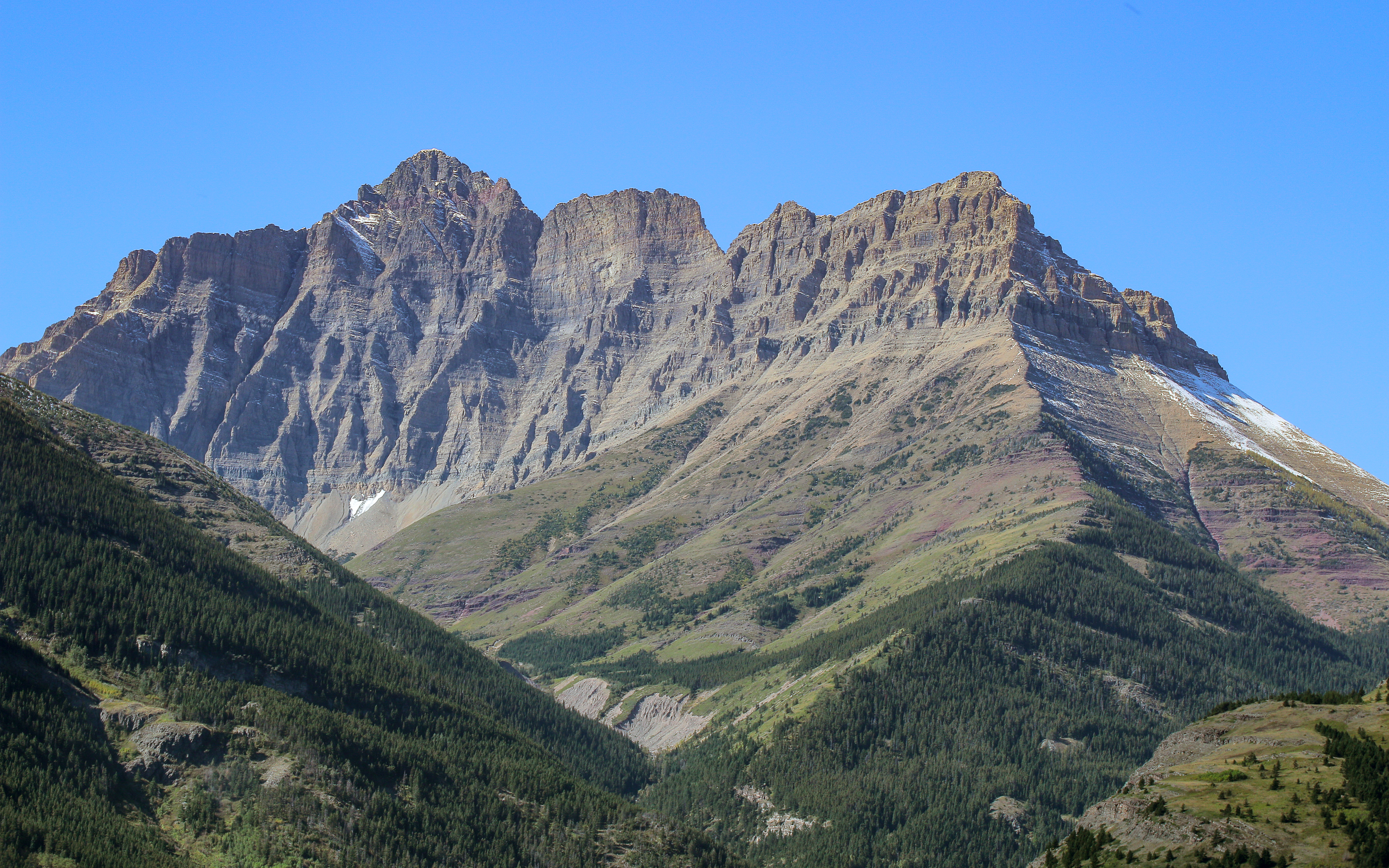
- Mount Blakiston

Highest point
- Elevation: 2,910 m (9,550 ft)
- Prominence: 1,149 m (3,770 ft)
- Parent peak: Kintla Peak 3071 m
- Listing: Mountains of Alberta
- Coordinates: 49°05′39″N 114°02′06″W

Geography
- Location within Alberta Location within Canada
- Location: Alberta, Canada
- Parent range: Clark Range
- Topo map: NTS 82G1 Sage Creek

Climbing
- First ascent: Unknown
- Easiest route: Moderate scramble

Mount Blakiston is a mountain in the southwestern corner of Alberta, Canada and the highest point within Waterton Lakes National Park. The mountain is situated in the Clark Range, north of Lineham Creek and south of Blakiston Creek. Blakiston's closest neighbours include Mount Hawkins 2,685 m (8,809 ft) directly to the west along a connecting ridge and Mount Lineham 2,728 m (8,950 ft) to the south.

The mountain was named in 1858 for Thomas Blakiston, a member of the Palliser Expedition.

The Lineham Creek hiking trail passes along the foot of the southern slopes of the mountain and for capable scramblers, Blakiston's rubbly but steep southern slopes provide a suitable line of ascent. An ascent in 1942 by J. Gibson and G. Williams found an unmarked cairn on the summit so the first ascent party is unknown.

== Geology ==
Like other mountains in Waterton Lakes National Park, Mount Blakiston is composed of sedimentary rock laid down during the Precambrian to Jurassic periods. Formed in shallow seas, this sedimentary rock was pushed east and over the top of younger Cretaceous period rock during the Laramide orogeny.

== Climate ==
Based on the Köppen climate classification, Mount Blakiston is located in a subarctic climate with cold, snowy winters, and mild summers. Temperatures can drop below −20 C with wind chill factors below −30 C.

== See also ==
- Geology of Alberta
