= Packhorse Peak =

Mountain in British Columbia, Canada

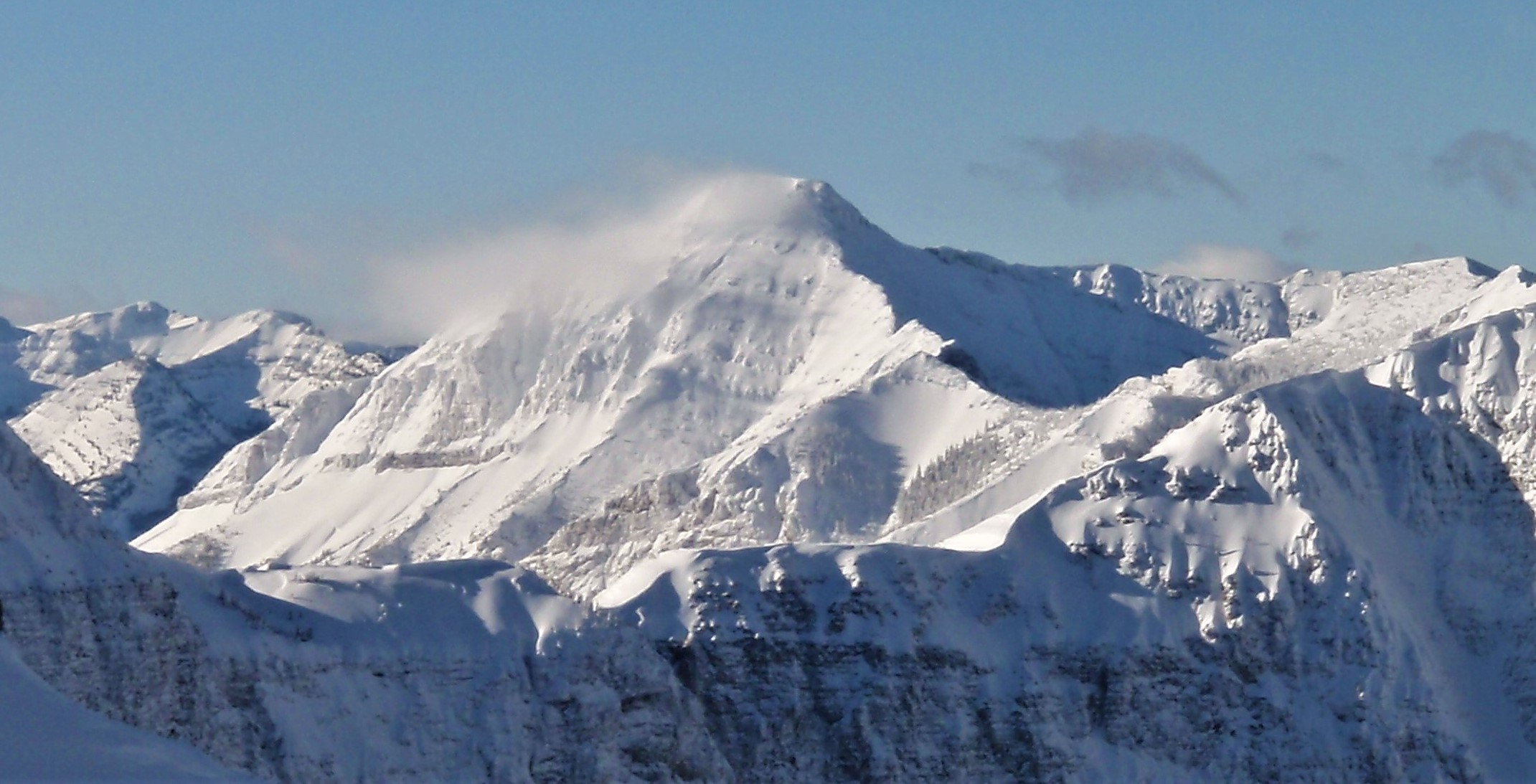
- Northeast aspect

Highest point
- Elevation: 2,412 m (7,913 ft)
- Prominence: 283 m (928 ft)
- Parent peak: St. Eloi Mountain (2,499 m)
- Listing: Mountains of British Columbia
- Coordinates: 49°17′03″N 114°31′29″W

Naming
- Etymology: Packhorse

Geography
- Location within British Columbia Location within Canada
- Interactive map of Packhorse Peak
- Country: Canada
- Province: British Columbia
- District: Kootenay Land District
- Parent range: Clark Range; Canadian Rockies
- Topo map: NTS 82G7 Flathead Ridge

Geology
- Rock age: Cambrian
- Rock type: sedimentary rock

Packhorse Peak is a summit in British Columbia, Canada.

== Description ==
Packhorse Peak is a 2,412-metre (7,913-foot) mountain located in the Clark Range of the Canadian Rockies. The remote peak is situated 5.0 km (3.1 mi) west of the Continental Divide and 45 km (28 mi) southeast of Fernie. The nearest higher neighbor is Tombstone Mountain, 3.4 km (2.1 mi) to the southeast. Packhorse Peak is more notable for its steep rise above local terrain than for its absolute elevation as topographic relief is significant with the summit rising over 885 meters (2,900 ft) above Cate Creek in 1.0 km (0.62 mi). Precipitation runoff from Packhorse Peak drains into tributaries of the Flathead River, which is three kilometers to the west. The mountain's toponym was published in 1917 from surveys performed in 1915, and was officially adopted in 1939 by the Geographical Names Board of Canada.

== Geology ==
Packhorse Peak is composed of sedimentary rock laid down during the Precambrian to Jurassic periods. Formed in shallow seas, this sedimentary rock was pushed east and over the top of younger Cretaceous period rock during the Laramide orogeny.

== Climate ==
Based on the Köppen climate classification, Packhorse Peak is located in a subarctic climate zone with cold, snowy winters, and mild summers. Winter temperatures can drop below −20 °C with wind chill factors below −30 °C.

== See also ==
- Geography of British Columbia
