= Border Ranges (Rocky Mountains) =

- Location within Alberta Location within British Columbia Location within Montana

Geography
- Countries: Canada; United States
- Provinces: British Columbia; Alberta
- State: Montana
- Range coordinates: 48°59′59″N 114°30′03″W
- Parent range: Rocky Mountains

The Border Ranges are the southernmost subdivision of the Canadian Rockies surrounding the borders of the Canadian provinces of British Columbia and Alberta, as well as the border of the U.S. state of Montana. It includes the Macdonald Range in British Columbia and Montana west of the Flathead River and east of the Wigwam River, the Clark Range straddling the British Columbia-Alberta-Montana borders east of the Flathead River, the Galton Range in British Columbia and Montana on the west side of the Wigwam River, and the Lewis Range in Alberta and Montana. In Montana, the Clark Range is called the Livingston Range whereas the Galton and Macdonald ranges are referred to as the Whitefish Range.
