= Samuel Anderson (surveyor) =

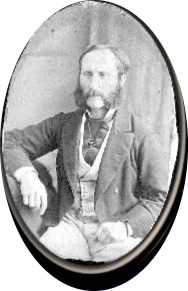
- Born: 15 November 1839; London, England
- Died: 11 September 1881; Scotland
- Occupation(s): Surveyor, astronomer, mapmaker, explorer

Samuel Anderson (15 November 1839 – 11 September 1881) was an English surveyor, astronomer and mapmaker. He was a Royal Engineer and was involved with mapping the Canada–United States border in the 1860s and 1870s.

== Career ==
Anderson was born on 15 November 1839 in London, England. He entered the Royal Military Academy in 1857 and graduated as a lieutenant in the Royal Engineers in December 1858, having won a sword for "exemplary conduct".

He was appointed to the staff of the first North American Boundary Commission, established following the 1846 Oregon Treaty to survey the 49th parallel from the Strait of Georgia eastward to the Rockies. He received intensive instruction in astronomy at the Ordnance Survey office in Southampton before sailing to Canada, arriving on Vancouver Island in December 1859. In 1862, he returned to the UK where he worked through to 1864 on completing maps and reports.

From November 1865 to June 1866, Anderson worked in Palestine producing material for a detailed map of western Palestine. He then worked in the Royal School of Military Engineering in Chatham, pioneering use of electrical telegraphs and other apparatus for military purposes.

In 1872, he returned to western Canada after being appointed chief astronomer to the second British commission, and arrived at Pembina on 18 September 1872. He led the work of the British commission, which surveyed the boundary from Lake of the Woods to the Rockies, completing the surveying and marking of 860 miles of boundary west of Pembina in August 1874. He then worked in Ottawa until the summer of 1875 before returning to London. Here, the record maps were signed on 29 May 1876. For his services, Anderson received a CMG in 1877, having also been elected a fellow of the Royal Geographical Society in 1876.

Anderson then joined the War Office as an assistant inspector of submarine defences, becoming an inspector in June 1881. He was promoted to the rank of major in September 1879. He died at his mother's house, Dalhousie Grange, in Scotland on 11 September 1881. He is remembered by a plaque at Rochester Cathedral as well as being the namesake of Anderson Peak located in Alberta, Canada.
