= Kinnerly Peak =

Mountain in Montana, United States

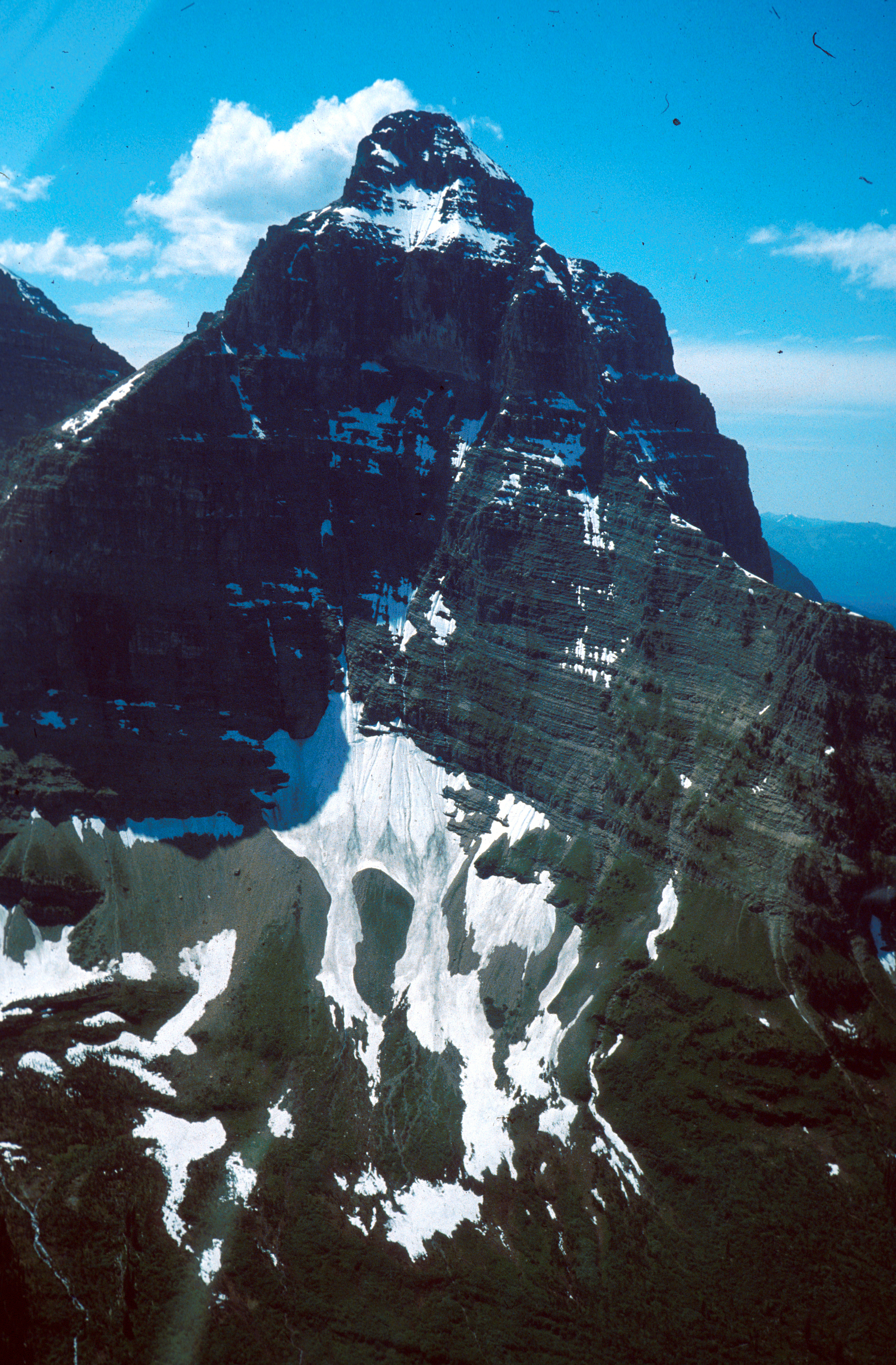

Highest point
- Elevation: 9,949 ft (3,032 m) NAVD 88
- Prominence: 1,465 ft (447 m)
- Coordinates: 48°57′22″N 114°09′55″W

Geography
- Location within Montana
- Location: Flathead County, Montana, U.S.
- Parent range: Livingston Range
- Topo map(s): USGS Kintla Peak, MT

Climbing
- First ascent: 1937 by Norman Clyde, Ed Hall, Richard K. Hill and Braeme Gigos
- Easiest route: class 4 or easy Class 5

Kinnerly Peak (9,949 ft (3,032 m)) is located in the Livingston Range, Glacier National Park in the U.S. state of Montana. It is approximately 1 mile (1.6 km) north of Kintla Peak, the highest peak in the Livingston Range, and 3 miles (4.8 km) south of the Canada–United States border. Both peaks are in the remote northwest corner of the park. Kinnerly Peak is the eighth tallest peak in Glacier National Park.

Kinnerly Peak is notable for its huge north face, which rises steeply from Upper Kintla Lake. From the lake to the summit is an elevation gain of 5,573 feet (1,699 m) in approximately a horizontal 1 mile (1.6 km).

The first recorded ascent of Kinnerly Peak was made by a Sierra Club party led by the noted mountaineer Norman Clyde, in 1937. The standard climbing route ascends the northwest face, starting from the south shore of Upper Kintla Lake. It involves a large amount of elevation gain, mostly by scrambling, but with some exposed and mildly technical sections (Class 4 or easy Class 5). Other routes exist on the southeast and southwest faces.

== Geology ==
Like other mountains in Glacier National Park, Kinnerly is composed of sedimentary rock laid down during the Precambrian to Jurassic periods. Formed in shallow seas, this sedimentary rock was initially uplifted beginning 170 million years ago when the Lewis Overthrust fault pushed an enormous slab of precambrian rocks 3 mi (4.8 km) thick, 50 miles (80 km) wide and 160 miles (260 km) long over younger rock of the cretaceous period.

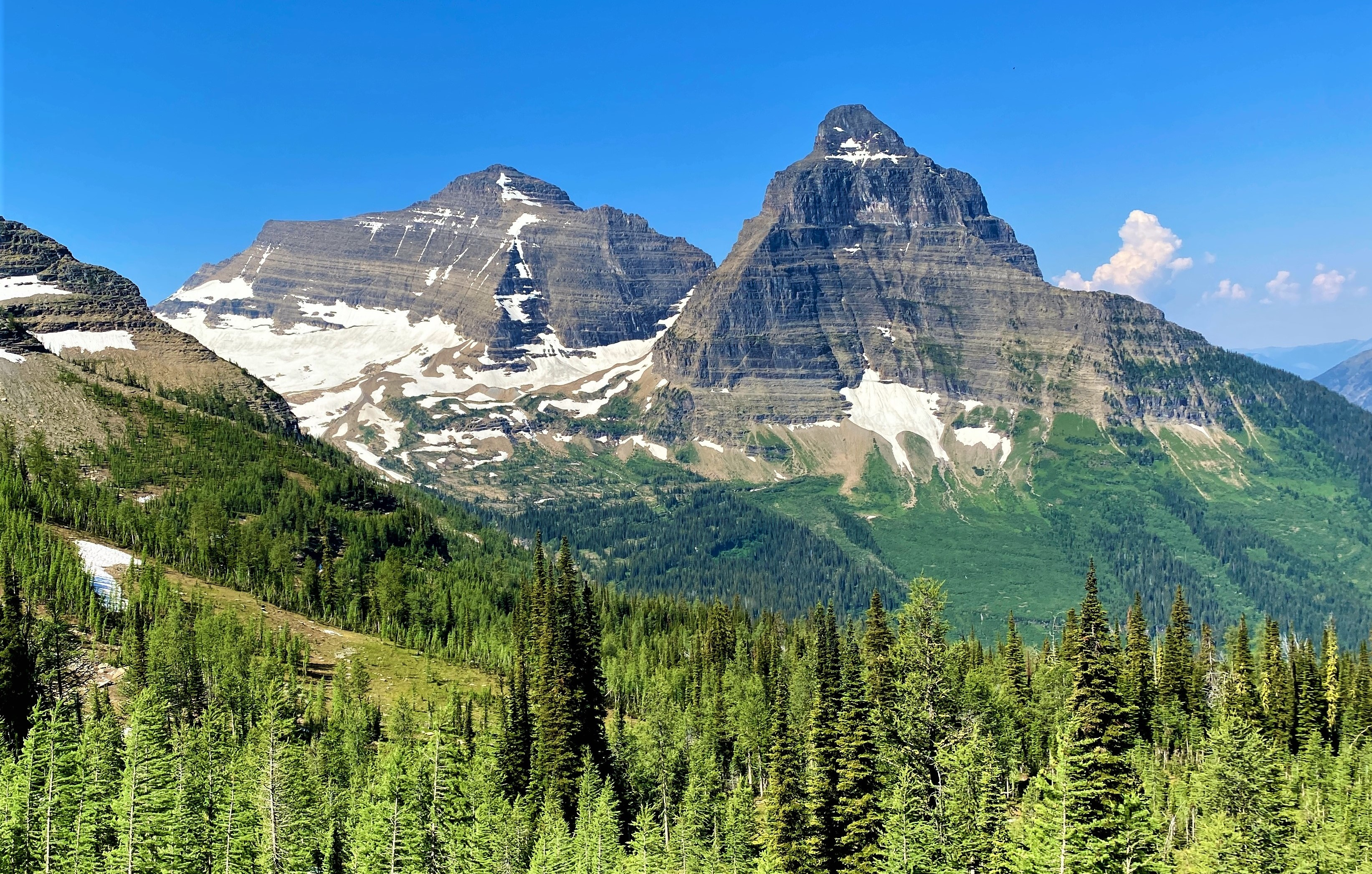
East aspect of Kintla Peak (left) and Kinnerly Peak (right)

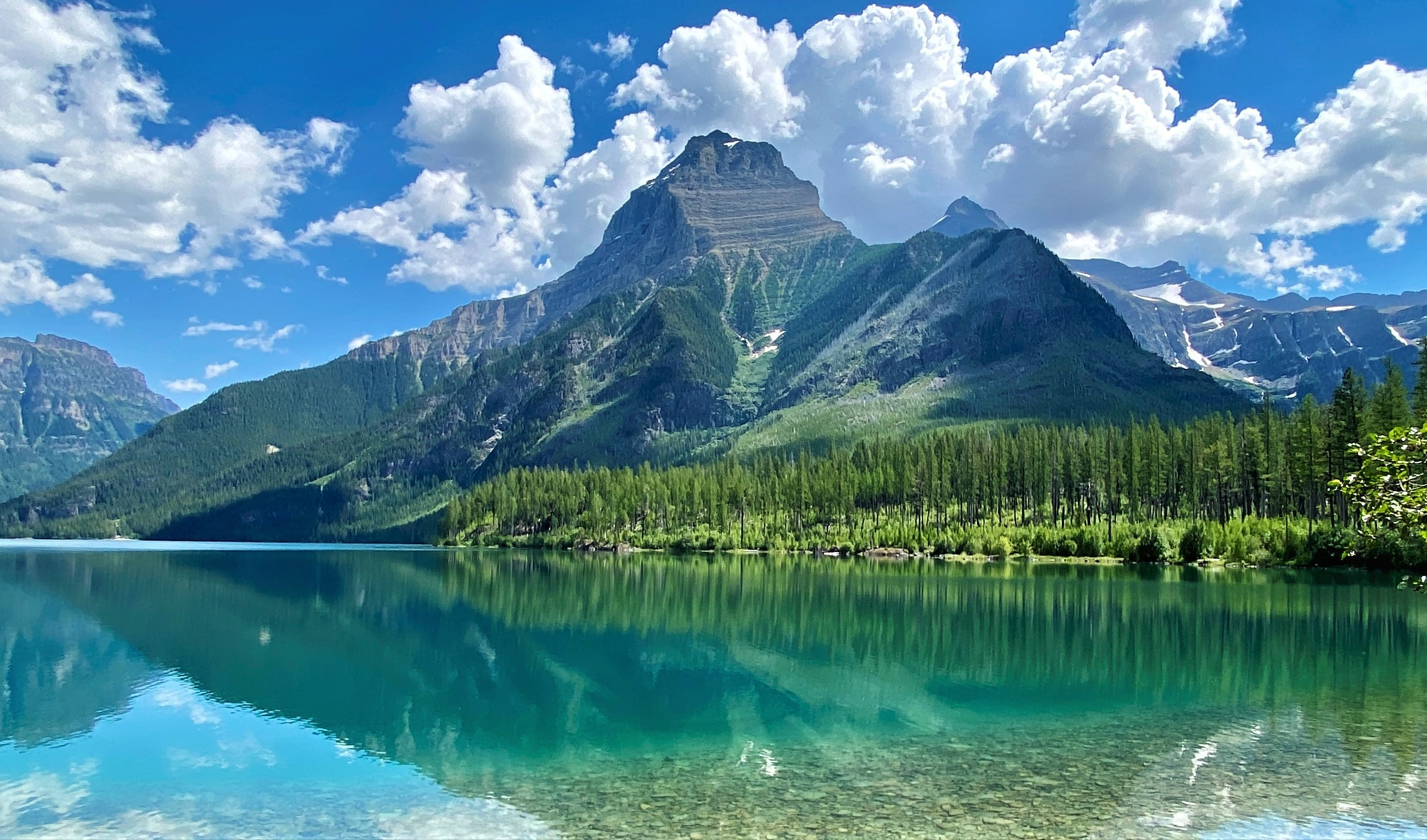
West aspect of Kinnerly Peak reflected in Kintla Lake

== See also ==
- Mountains and mountain ranges of Glacier National Park (U.S.)
