= Harris Glacier =

Glacier in Montana, United States

- Location within Montana
- Type: Mountain glacier
- Location: Glacier National Park, Flathead County, Montana, United States
- Coordinates: 48°57′00″N 114°13′44″W
- Area: Approximately 8 acres (3.2 ha) in 2005
- Terminus: Moraine and talus
- Status: Retreating

Harris Glacier is located in the US state of Montana in Glacier National Park. The glacier is situated in a cirque immediately to the northeast of Parke Peak at an elevation between 7,000 ft (2,100 m) and 6,600 ft (2,000 m) above sea level. The glacier covers an area of approximately 8 acres (0.032 km^{2}) and does not meet the threshold of 25 acres (0.10 km^{2}) often cited as being the minimum size to qualify as an active glacier. Between 1966 and 2005, the glacier lost 77 percent of its acreage.

== See also ==
- List of glaciers in the United States
- Glaciers in Glacier National Park (U.S.)
