= Parke Peak =

Mountain in Montana, United States

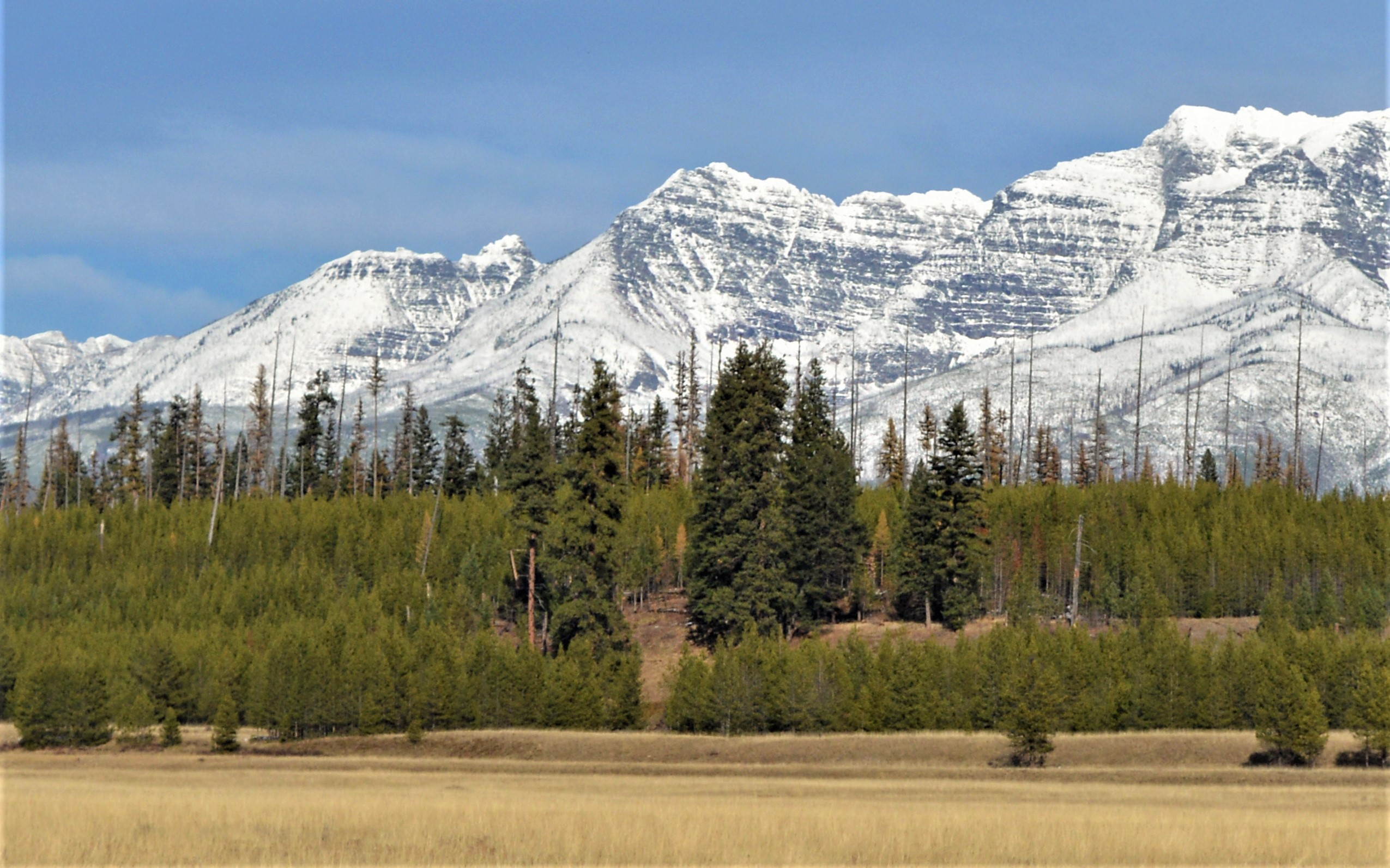
- Southwest aspect (centered)

Highest point
- Elevation: 9,043 ft (2,756 m)
- Prominence: 638 ft (194 m)
- Coordinates: 48°56′44″N 114°14′21″W

Naming
- Etymology: John Parke

Geography
- Location within Montana Location within the United States
- Location: Flathead County, Montana, U.S.
- Parent range: Livingston Range
- Topo map(s): USGS Kintla Peak, MT

Climbing
- Easiest route: class 3

Parke Peak (9,043 feet (2,756 m)) is located in the Livingston Range, Glacier National Park in the U.S. state of Montana. Harris Glacier is immediately northeast of Parke Peak. The mountain is named for John G. Parke (1827–1900), of the International Boundary Survey.

== Climate ==
Based on the Köppen climate classification, the peak is located in an alpine subarctic climate zone with long, cold, snowy winters, and cool to warm summers. Temperatures can drop below −10 °F with wind chill factors below −30 °F.

== See also ==
- List of mountains and mountain ranges of Glacier National Park (U.S.)

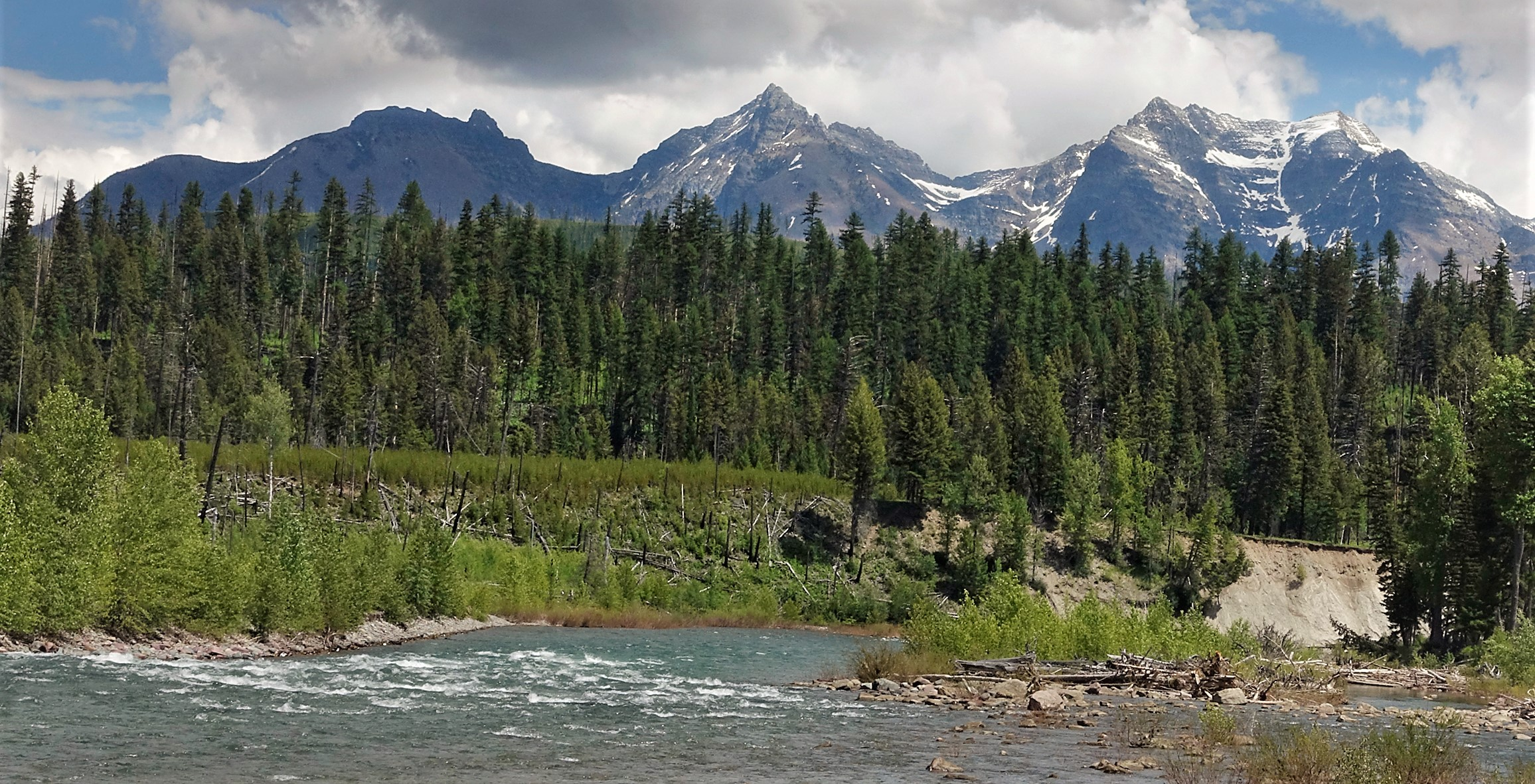
West aspect of Parke Peak, center
