= Upper Kintla Lake =

Lake in Montana, United States

- Location within Montana Location within the United States
- Location: Glacier National Park, Flathead County, Montana, US
- Coordinates: 48°58′26″N 114°10′34″W
- Type: Natural
- Primary inflows: Kintla Creek
- Primary outflows: Kintla Creek
- Basin countries: United States
- Max. length: 2.75 mi (4.43 km)
- Max. width: .45 mi (0.72 km)
- Surface elevation: 4,371 ft (1,332 m)

Upper Kintla Lake is located in Glacier National Park, in the U. S. state of Montana. Upper Kintla Lake is 2 miles (3.2 km) east of Kintla Lake and the surrounding mountains rise dramatically above the north and south shores of the lake. Kinnerly Peak rises 5,575 feet (1,699 m) above the south shoreline of Upper Kintla Lake while Long Knife Peak towers more than 5,400 feet (1,600 m) above the northwest shoreline and Gardner Point rises 3,000 feet (910 m) above the east end of the lake.

== See also ==
- List of lakes in Flathead County, Montana (M-Z)
