= Kintla Peak =

Mountain in Montana, United States

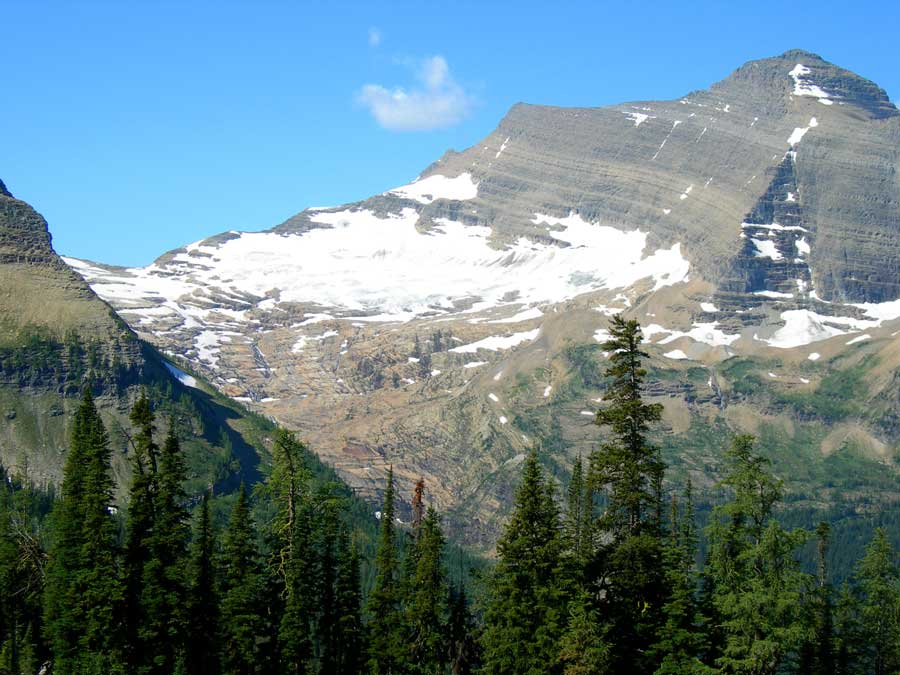
- Kintla Peak at right above Agassiz Glacier

Highest point
- Elevation: 10,106 ft (3,080 m) NAVD 88
- Prominence: 4,401 ft (1,341 m)
- Parent peak: Mount Cleveland
- Coordinates: 48°56′38″N 114°10′16″W

Geography
- Location within Montana Location within the United States
- Location: Flathead County, Montana, U.S.
- Parent range: Livingston Range
- Topo map(s): USGS Kintla Peak, MT

Geology
- Rock age: Precambrian (Mesoproterozoic)

Climbing
- Easiest route: Scramble (Class 3/4), often some snow

Kintla Peak (10,106 ft (3,080 m)) is a pyramidal peak in the Livingston Range of Glacier National Park in the U.S. state of Montana. It is the tallest mountain in the Livingston Range and the third-tallest in the park. It is also the most northerly peak and land area in the contiguous United States above 10,000 ft (3,000 m). The Agassiz Glacier lies below it to the southeast.

Kintla Peak consists of ancient Precambrian (Mesoproterozoic) rock strata that are part of the Belt Supergroup. It is named after the Kintla Lakes, and the word "Kintla" originates from the Kootenai word for "sack". Kootenai legend states that a man had apparently drowned in one of the lakes and likened the lake to a sack where "once you got in, you couldn't get out".

Kintla Peak lies the remote northwest corner of the park and a hike of almost 15 miles (24 km) from the nearest road is required just to reach the base of the mountain. The peak is notable for its large rise above local terrain; the elevation of nearby Upper Kintla Lake is only 4,370 feet (1,330 m). (Kintla Peak's northern neighbor Kinnerly Peak has an even more dramatic drop to Upper Kintla Lake.) This helps make Kintla "the most arduous climb in the northwest section of the park". The standard route is the Southeast Ridge Route, from the Agassiz Glacier basin. This route has a long approach and a large total vertical gain, and involves rock scrambling up to Class 4, in addition to some climbing on snow, depending on the season. Other routes include the East Ridge, West Face, and Upper North Face routes.

== Climate ==
Climate data for Kintla Peak 48.9414N, 114.1782 W, Elevation: 9,288 ft (2,831 m) (1991–2020 normals)
Month	Jan	Feb	Mar	Apr	May	Jun	Jul	Aug	Sep	Oct	Nov	Dec	Year
Mean daily maximum °F (°C)	21.5 (−5.8)	21.1 (−6.1)	25.0 (−3.9)	29.6 (−1.3)	38.9 (3.8)	46.5 (8.1)	57.1 (13.9)	57.8 (14.3)	50.0 (10.0)	36.8 (2.7)	25.0 (−3.9)	20.2 (−6.6)	35.8 (2.1)
Daily mean °F (°C)	15.4 (−9.2)	13.6 (−10.2)	16.1 (−8.8)	20.6 (−6.3)	29.3 (−1.5)	36.1 (2.3)	45.5 (7.5)	45.6 (7.6)	38.4 (3.6)	27.8 (−2.3)	19.1 (−7.2)	14.4 (−9.8)	26.8 (−2.9)
Mean daily minimum °F (°C)	9.2 (−12.7)	6.1 (−14.4)	7.3 (−13.7)	11.6 (−11.3)	19.7 (−6.8)	25.8 (−3.4)	33.9 (1.1)	33.3 (0.7)	26.8 (−2.9)	18.7 (−7.4)	13.2 (−10.4)	8.7 (−12.9)	17.9 (−7.8)
Average precipitation inches (mm)	12.24 (311)	8.34 (212)	9.34 (237)	6.88 (175)	6.20 (157)	7.26 (184)	2.39 (61)	2.31 (59)	4.21 (107)	6.61 (168)	10.05 (255)	11.54 (293)	87.37 (2,219)
Source: PRISM Climate Group

== See also ==
- List of mountains and mountain ranges of Glacier National Park (U.S.)

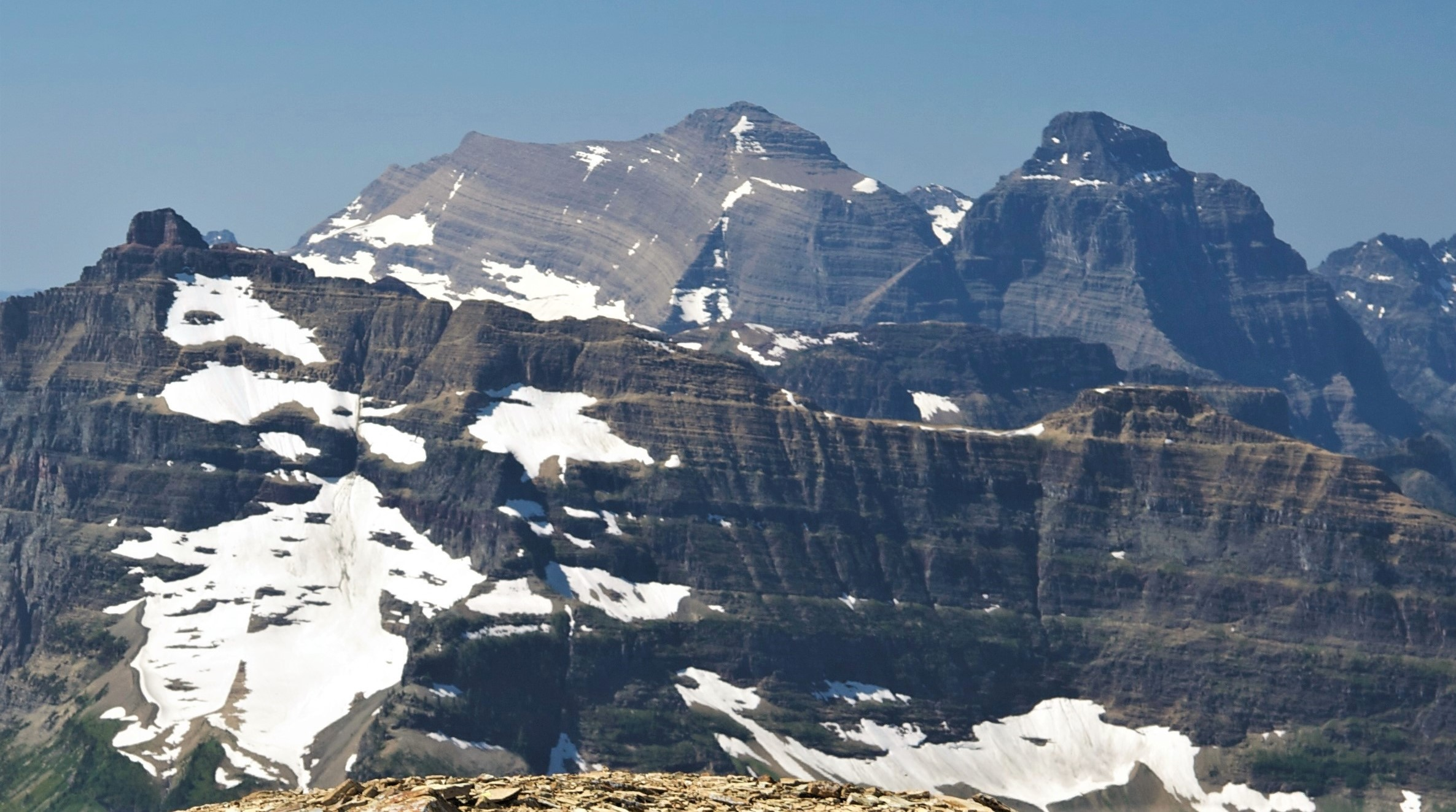
Mt. Custer (front, left), Kintla Peak (center), Kinnerly Peak (right) seen from Mount Alderson.
