= Agassiz Glacier (Montana) =

Glacier in Montana, United States

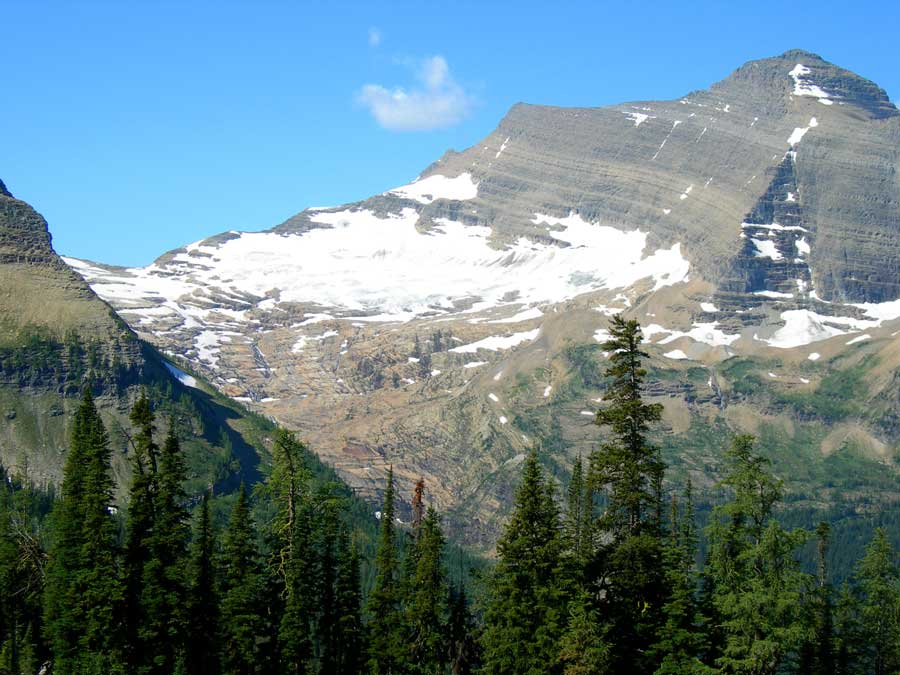
- Agassiz Glacier in 2005

- Location within Montana
- Type: cirque glacier
- Location: Glacier National Park, Flathead County, Montana, U.S.
- Coordinates: 48°56′02″N 114°09′28″W
- Area: 256 acres (1.04 km^{2}) in 2005
- Length: .40 mi (0.64 km)
- Terminus: Bare rock
- Status: Retreating

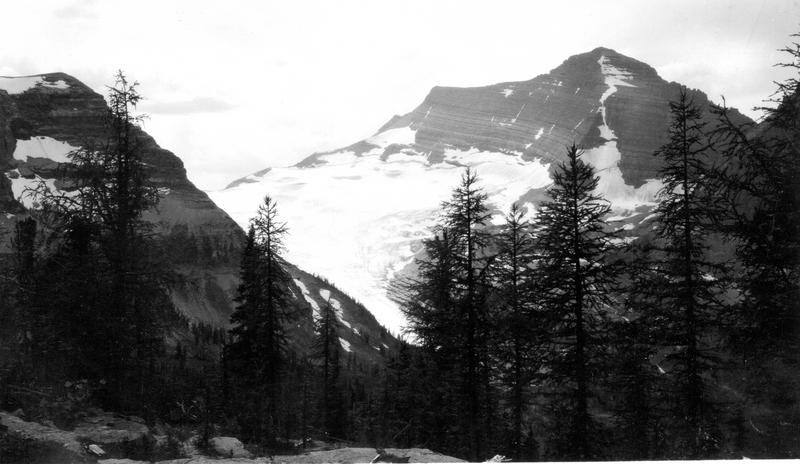
Agassiz Glacier, 1913

Agassiz Glacier is in Glacier National Park in the U.S. state of Montana. It is named after Louis Agassiz, a Swiss-American glaciologist. The glacier is situated in a cirque to the southeast of Kintla Peak west of the Continental Divide. Agassiz Glacier is one of several glaciers that have been selected for monitoring by the U.S. Geological Survey's Glacier Monitoring Research program, which is researching changes to the mass balance of glaciers in and surrounding Glacier National Park.

The glacier is being monitored using remote sensing equipment and repeat photography, where images of the glacier are taken from identical locations periodically. Tree ring samples have also been used previously to determine the extent of glacier retreat. Between 1966 and 2005, Agassiz Glacier lost a third of its surface area.

== See also ==
- List of glaciers in the United States
- Glaciers in Glacier National Park (U.S.)
