= Mount Alderson =

Mountain in Waterton Lakes NP, Alberta, Canada

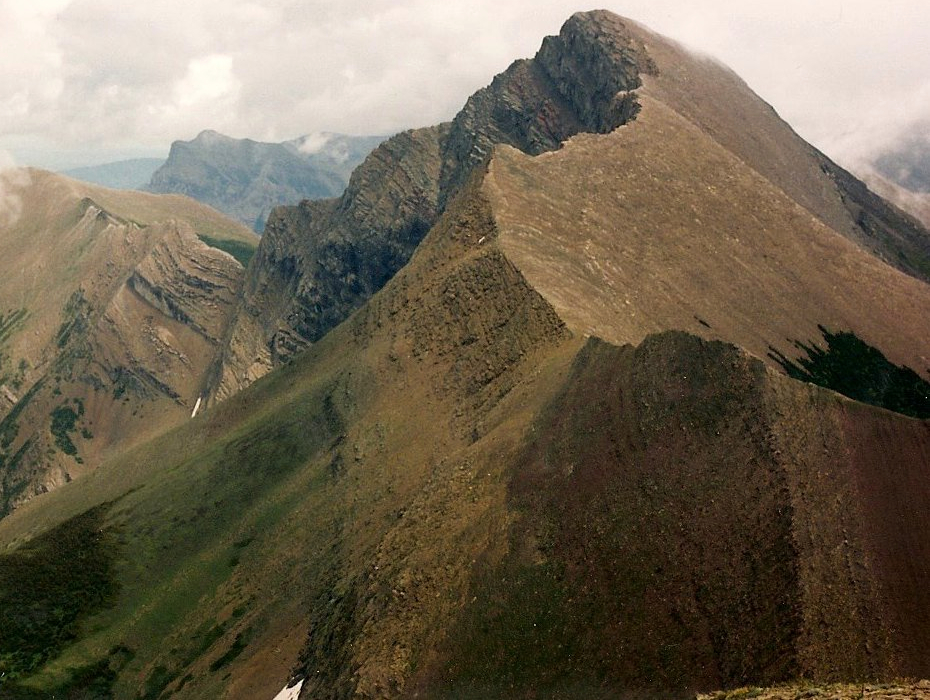

Highest point
- Elevation: 2,692 m (8,832 ft)
- Prominence: 712 m (2,336 ft)
- Parent peak: Mount Custer (2707 m)
- Coordinates: 49°01′24″N 113°58′09″W

Geography
- Location within Alberta Location within Canada
- Interactive map of Mount Alderson
- Location: Alberta, Canada
- Parent range: Clark Range; Canadian Rockies
- Topo map: NTS 82H4 Waterton Lakes

Geology
- Rock age: Cambrian

Mount Alderson is a 2,692-metre (8,832-foot) summit located in Waterton Lakes National Park, in the Canadian Rockies of Alberta, Canada. Its nearest higher peak is Mount Custer, 8.0 km (5.0 mi) to the southwest. Mount Richards is situated 2.0 km (1.2 mi) to the southeast, and Bertha Peak is to the immediate northeast.

== History ==
Mount Alderson was named for Sir Edwin Alfred Hervey Alderson, a senior British Army officer who served in several campaigns of the late nineteenth and early twentieth centuries, ultimately in command of the Canadian Corps in World War I. The mountain's name was officially adopted in 1943 by the Geographical Names Board of Canada.

== Geology ==
Like other mountains in Waterton Lakes National Park, Mount Alderson is composed of sedimentary rock laid down during the Precambrian to Jurassic periods. Formed in shallow seas, this sedimentary rock was pushed east and over the top of younger Cretaceous period rock during the Laramide orogeny.

== Climate ==
Based on the Köppen climate classification, Mount Alderson is located in a subarctic climate with cold, snowy winters, and mild summers. Temperatures can drop below −20 °C with wind chill factors below −30 °C. Precipitation runoff from Mount Alderson drains into Waterton Lake, thence Waterton River.

== Gallery ==
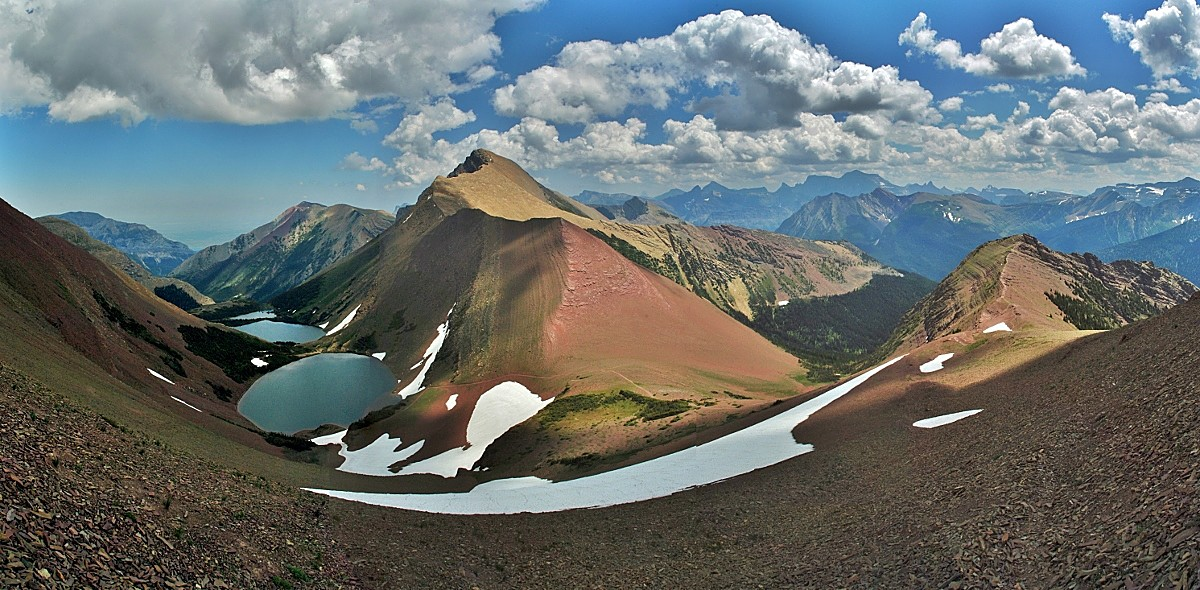
Mount Alderson from the west

== See also ==
- Geology of Alberta
- Geography of Alberta
