= Clark Range (Rocky Mountains) =

Mountain range in Canada and the United States

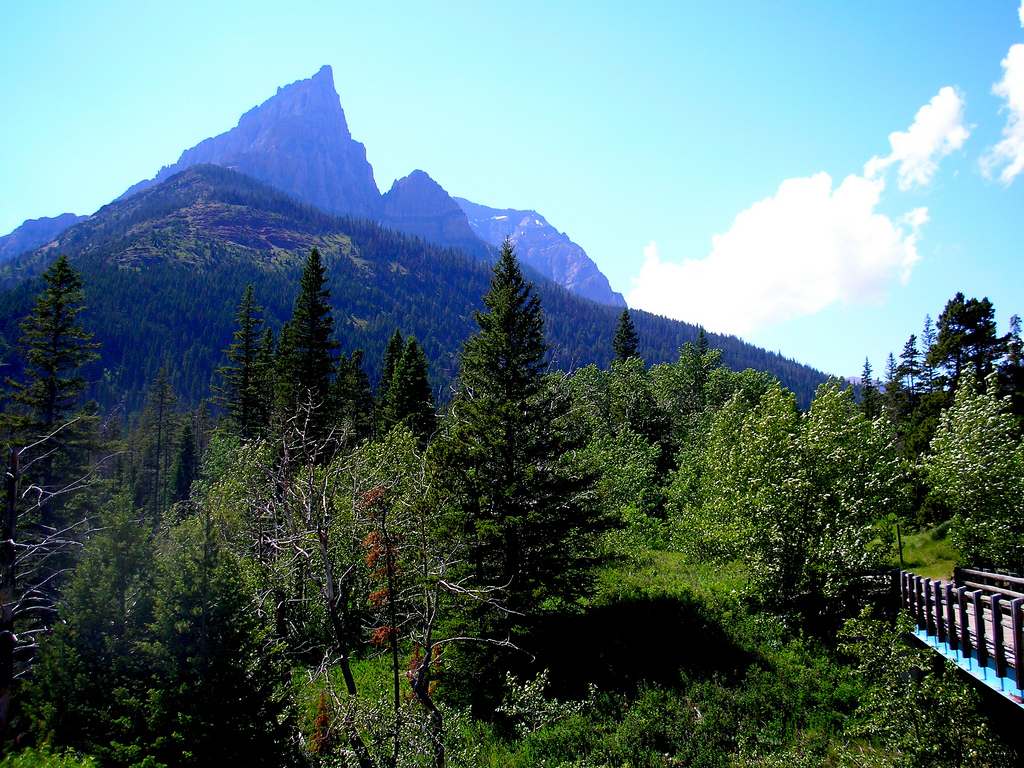
- Mount Anderson in southwest Alberta

Highest point
- Peak: Long Knife Peak
- Elevation: 2,982 m (9,783 ft)
- Coordinates: 48°59′50″N 114°12′28″W

Geography
- Location within Alberta Location within Montana
- Countries: Canada; United States
- Provinces: British Columbia; Alberta
- State: Montana
- Range coordinates: 49°10′59″N 114°23′03″W
- Parent range: Border Ranges
- Topo map: NTS 82G1 Sage Creek

The Clark Range (formerly Clarke Range) is a mountain range that forms part of the Continental Divide and also the boundary between the Canadian provinces of Alberta and British Columbia. A small portion of the range extends into the far northwestern section of Glacier National Park, Montana, United States. It is the easternmost of the Border Ranges subdivision of the Canadian Rockies. The range is named for Captain William Clark of the Lewis and Clark Expedition.

This range includes the following mountains and peaks:

Mountain/Peak	metres	feet
Long Knife Peak	2,982	9,784
Mount Blakiston	2,932	9,619
Anderson Peak	2,698	8,852
Kenow Mountain	2,697	8,850
Mount Alderson	2,692	8,831
Mount Haig	2,610	8,563
Miskwasini Peak	2,594	8,510
Scarpe Mountain	2,591	8,501
Langemarck Mountain	2,575	8,450
Commerce Peak	2,554	8,381
Tombstone Mountain	2,514	8,250
Mount Matkin	2,418	7,933
Packhorse Peak	2,411	7,910
Mount Richards	2,377	7,799
Font Mountain	2,353	7,720
