= Summit Lake (Alberta) =

Lake in Alberta, Canada

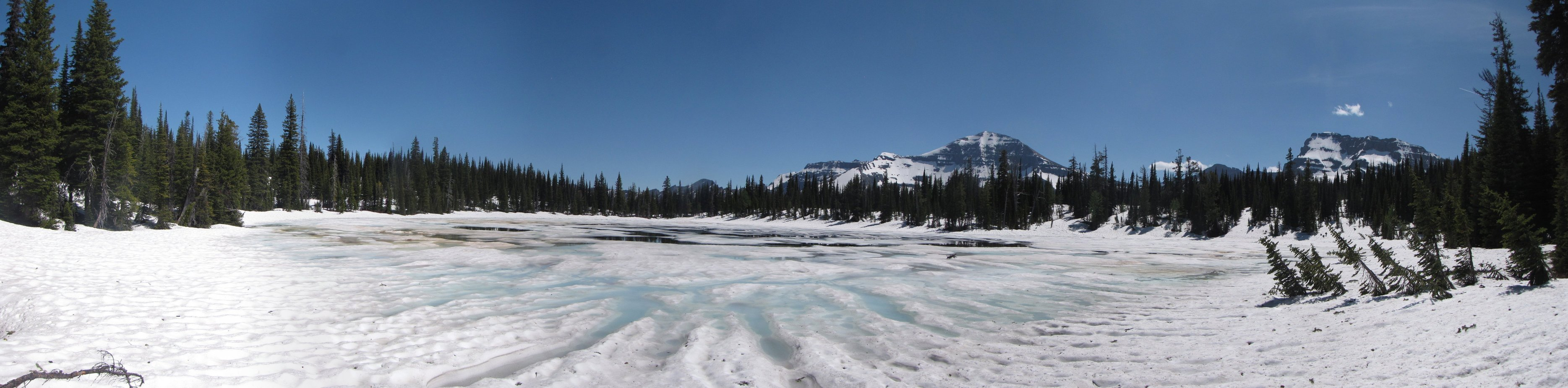
- Summit Lake looking toward Mount Custer and Chapman Peak

- Location within Alberta
- Location: Waterton Lakes National Park, Alberta
- Coordinates: 49°0′26″N 114°1′32″W
- Basin countries: Canada
- Surface elevation: 1,942 m (6,371 ft)

Summit Lake is located east of Cameron Lake in Waterton Lakes National Park Alberta, Canada along the Alderson-Carthew trail. It lies in the pass between Mount Carthew and Mount Custer.

In August
