= Mount Carthew =

Mountain in the country of Canada

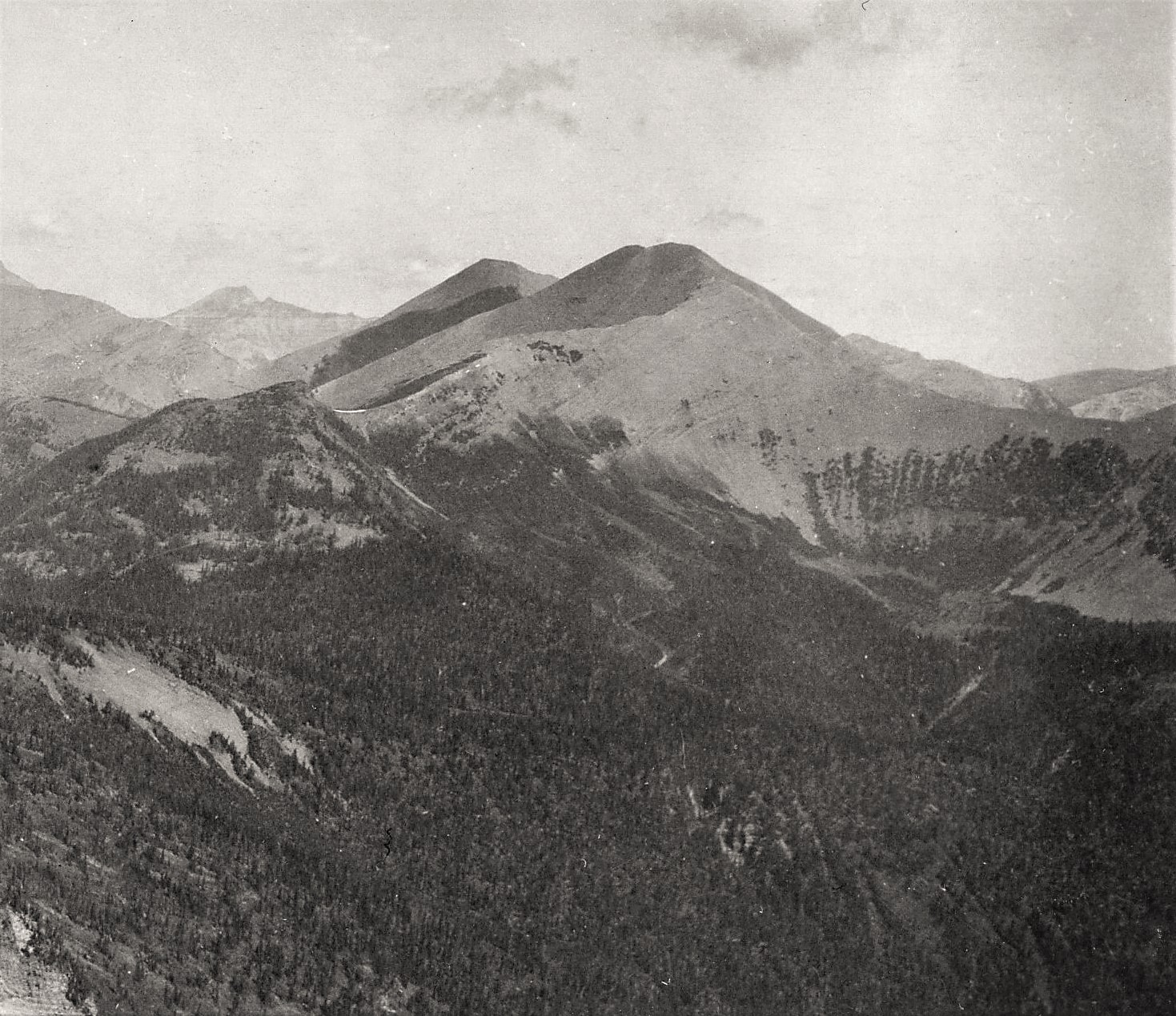
- Mt. Carthew from SSW in 1913

Highest point
- Elevation: 2,636 m (8,648 ft)
- Prominence: 313 m (1,027 ft)
- Parent peak: Mount Alderson (2692 m)
- Coordinates: 49°01′56″N 114°00′06″W

Geography
- Location within Alberta Location within Canada
- Location: Alberta, Canada
- Parent range: Clark Range; Canadian Rockies
- Topo map: NTS 82G1 Sage Creek

Mount Carthew is a 2,636-metre (8,648-foot) mountain summit located in Waterton Lakes National Park, in the Canadian Rockies of Alberta, Canada.

Mount Carthew was named after William Morden Carthew, a World War I casualty.

== See also ==
- List of mountains of Alberta
