= Mount Custer =

Mountain in Montana, United States

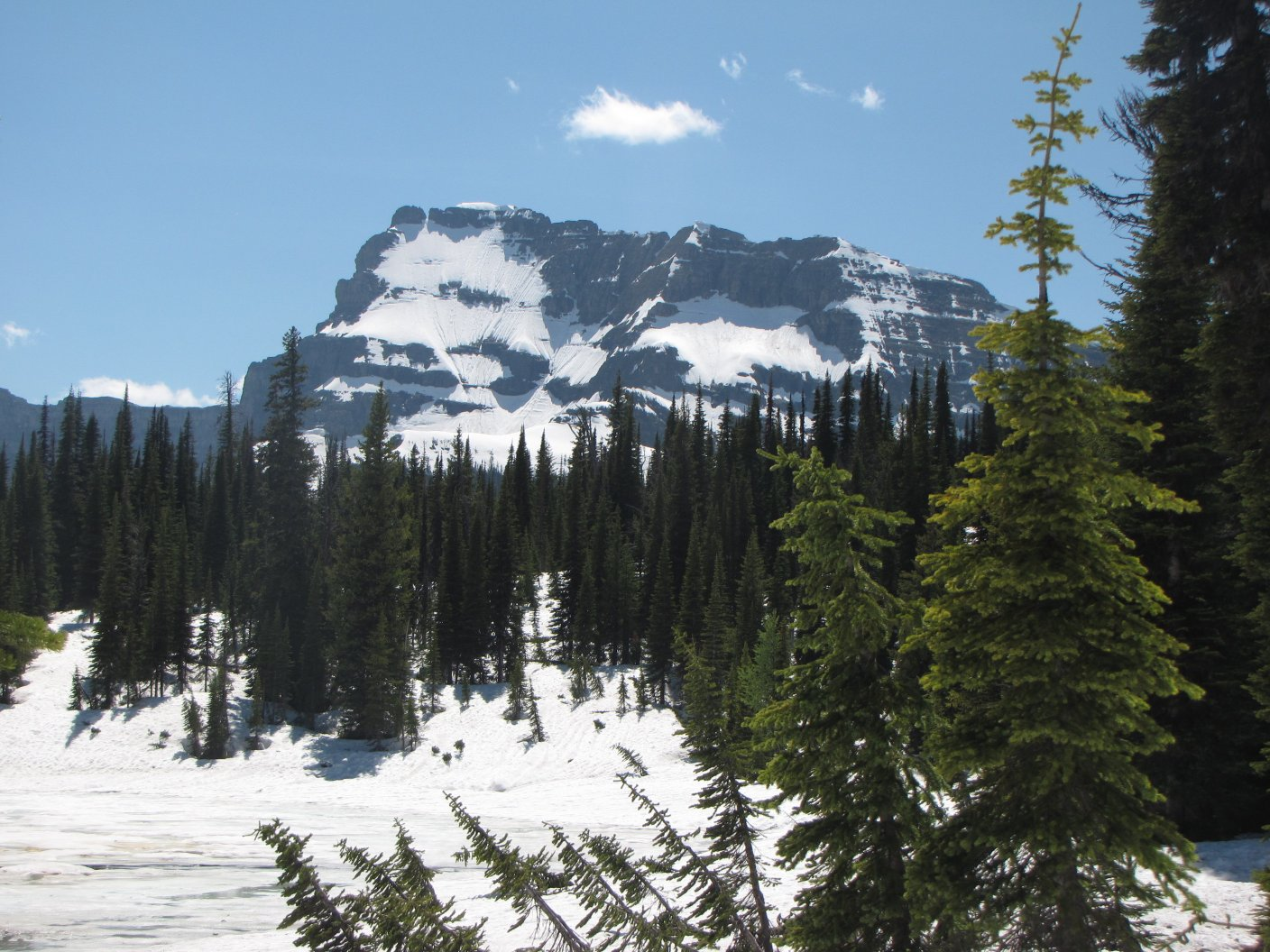
- Mount Custer as seen from the northeast. Taken from Summit Lake

Highest point
- Elevation: 8,888 ft (2,709 m) NAVD 88
- Prominence: 1,203 ft (367 m)
- Parent peak: Chapman Peak
- Coordinates: 48°58′49″N 114°03′29″W

Geography
- Location within Montana Location within the United States
- Location: Flathead County, Glacier County, Montana, U.S.
- Parent range: Livingston Range
- Topo map(s): USGS Mount Carter, MT

Mount Custer (8,888 feet (2,709 m)) is a mountain in the Livingston Range, Glacier National Park in the U.S. state of Montana. Situated along the Continental Divide, Mount Custer rises more than 3,300 feet (1,000 m) above Lake Nooney, located below the summit to the east. Herbst Glacier is immediately northeast of the peak. The mountain is probably named for George Armstrong Custer, of Custer's Last Stand.

== Climate ==
Based on the Köppen climate classification, Mount Custer has in a subarctic climate characterized by long, usually very cold winters, and short, cool to mild summers. Temperatures can drop below −10 °F with wind chill factors below −30 °F.

== Geology ==
Like other mountains in Glacier National Park, Mount Custer is composed of sedimentary rock laid down during the Precambrian to Jurassic periods. Formed in shallow seas, this sedimentary rock was initially uplifted beginning 170 million years ago when the Lewis Overthrust fault pushed an enormous slab of precambrian rocks 3 mi (4.8 km) thick, 50 miles (80 km) wide and 160 miles (260 km) long over younger rock of the cretaceous period.

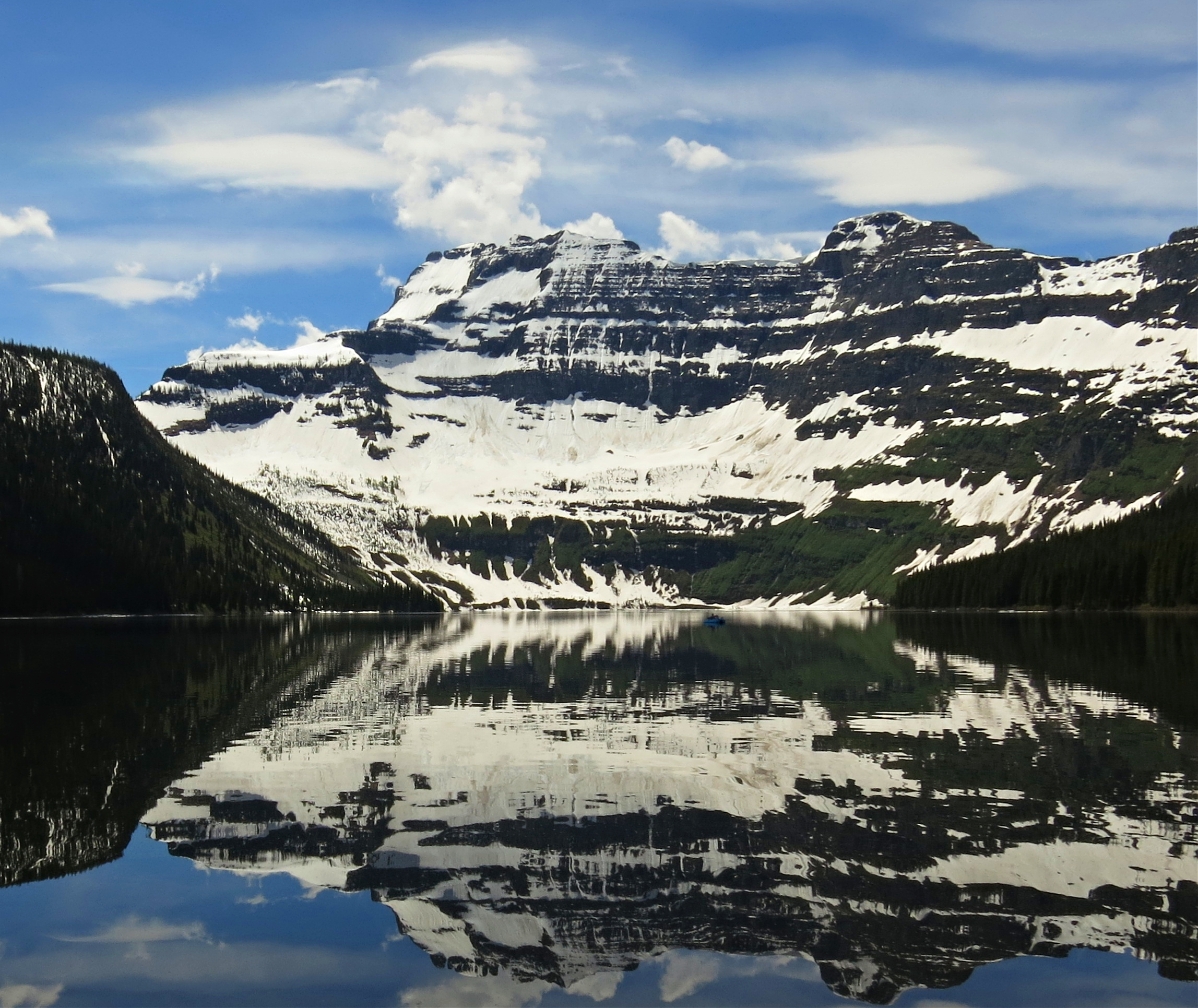
North face from Cameron Lake (Alberta, Canada)

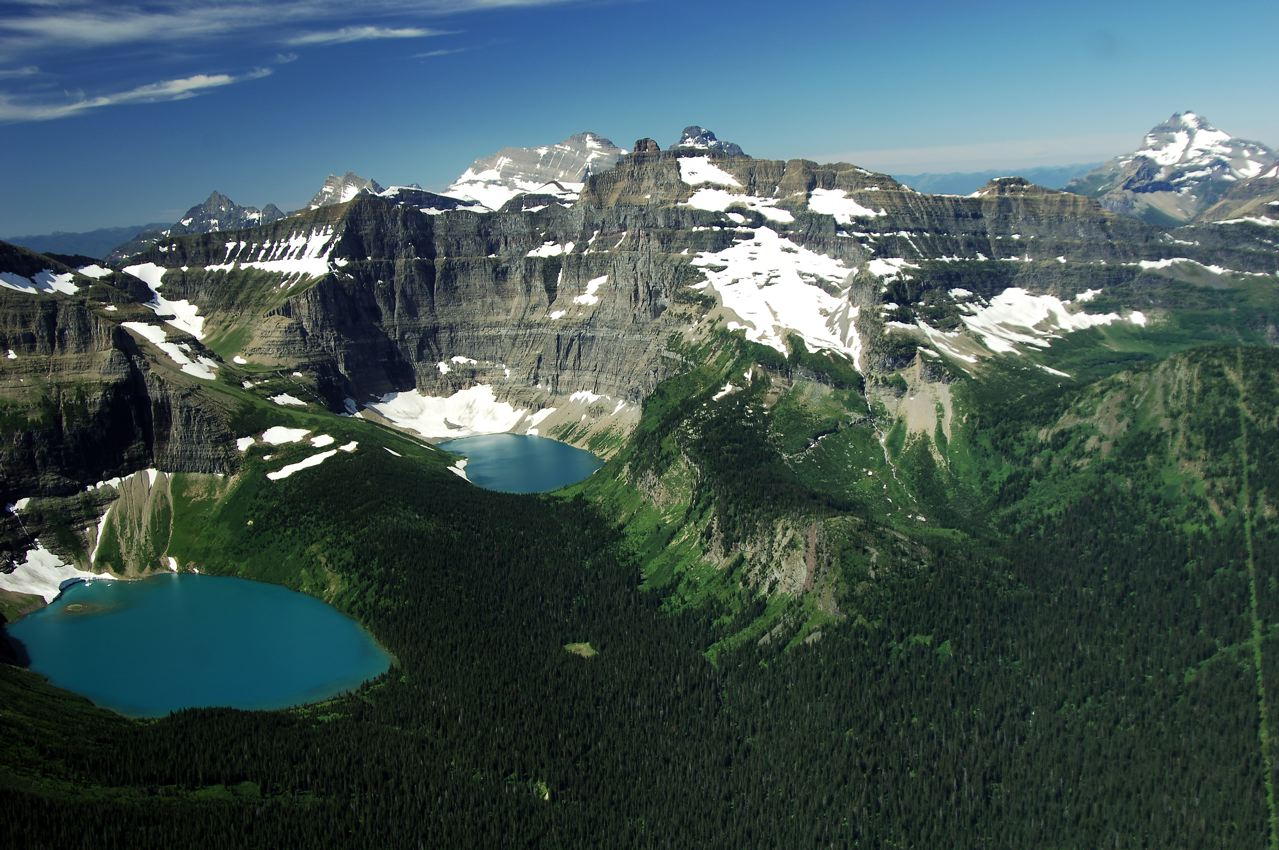
Aerial view of Mount Custer. Lookking WSW.

== See also ==
- List of mountains and mountain ranges of Glacier National Park (U.S.)
- Geology of the Rocky Mountains
