= Boundary Fire =

Boundary Fire may refer to:

- Boundary Fire (2017), in Arizona, United States
- Boundary Fire (2018), in Montana, United States
