= Boundary Fire (2018) =

2018 wildfire in Montana, United States

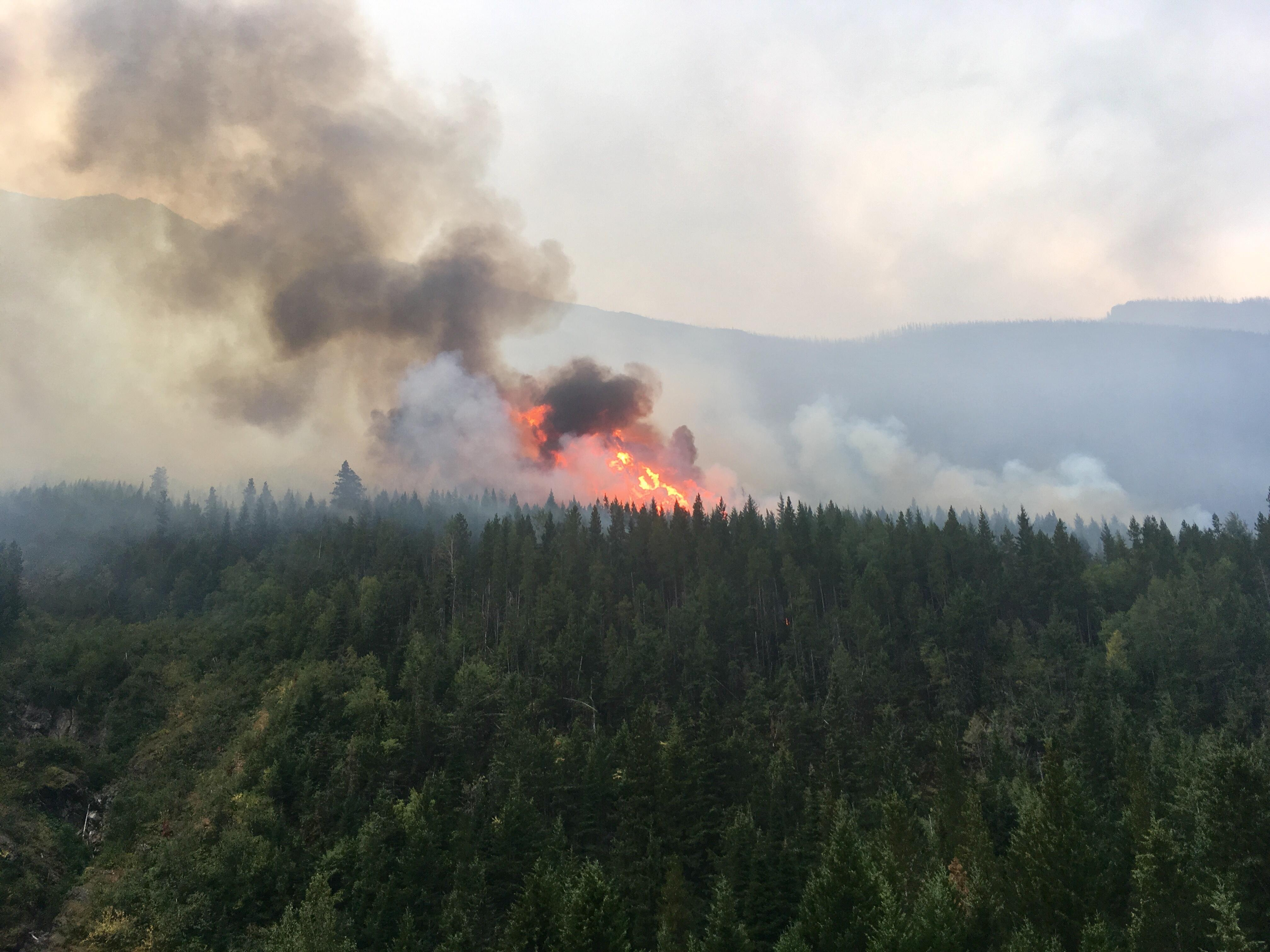
- Boundary Fire on August 26, 2018
- Date: August 23 - September 19, 2018; 6:15PM
- Location: Glacier National Park, Glacier County, Montana, United States
- Coordinates: 48.98°N 113.976°W

Statistics
- Burned area: 2,911 acres (1,178 ha)
- Land use: Forest

Impacts
- Deaths: 0
- Injuries: 0

Ignition
- Cause: Unknown

The Boundary Fire was a wildfire in Glacier National Park in the U.S. state of Montana. First reported on the evening of August 23, 2018, the fire was located slightly more than a mile west of Waterton Lake in the Boundary Creek Valley near Campbell Mountain. The fire straddles the international border but did not cross into Waterton Lakes National Park in Alberta, Canada.

== Fire ==
After it was detected on August 23, the fire quickly grew to more than 1,500 acres (610 ha) over the next two days but cooler and wetter weather conditions prevented significant growth after that. Firefighters were deployed to the Goat Haunt region to install sprinklers and be prepared for structure protection. By September 9, the fire was reported as being 2,896 acres (1,172 ha) and only 12 percent contained.

By September 13, the fire's activity decreased significantly, with most burning occurring within the interior of the fire perimeter. Fire crews continued to patrol and conduct mop-up operations, gradually removing structural protection measures as the conditions improved.

By September 19, the fire had reached a final size of approximately 2,911 acres (1,178 ha), and was reported to be 36% contained. Fire behavior at that time was minimal, with only isolated smoke visible, and management transitioned primarily to monitoring.

== Aftermath ==
No injuries were reported, and the cause of the fire remained undetermined.
