= Forum Peak =

Mountain on border of Alberta and British Columbia in Canada

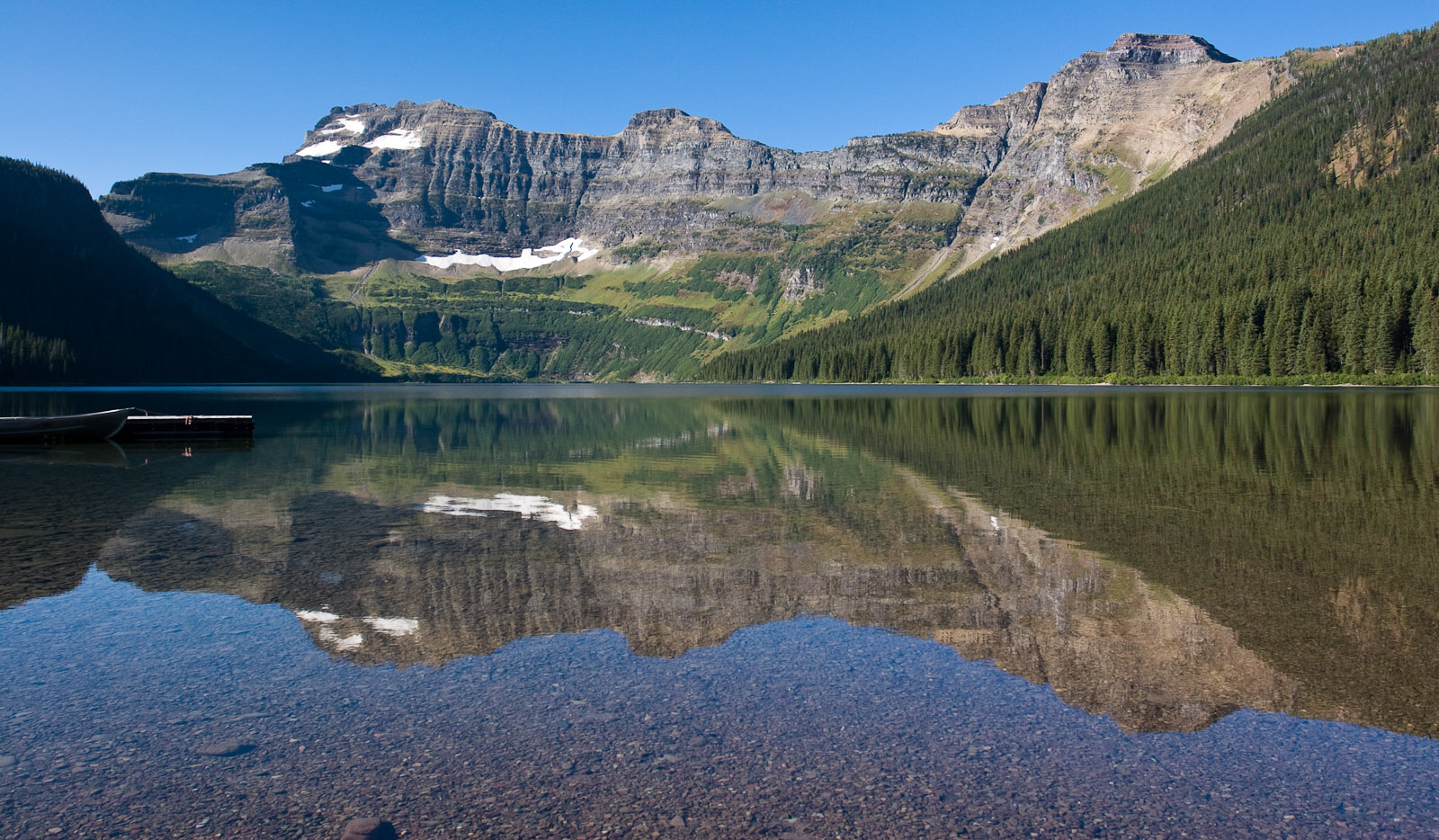
- Forum Peak in upper right, Mount Custer to left.

Highest point
- Elevation: 2,415 m (7,923 ft)
- Listing: Mountains of Alberta; Mountains of British Columbia
- Coordinates: 49°00′15″N 114°04′16″W

Geography
- Location within Alberta Location within British Columbia Location within Canada
- Country: Canada
- Provinces: Alberta and British Columbia
- District: Kootenay Land District
- Protected area: Waterton Lakes National Park
- Parent range: Canadian Rockies
- Topo map: NTS 82G1 Sage Creek

Forum Peak is a summit located on the border of Alberta and British Columbia on the Continental Divide. It is the southernmost mountain in the Canadian Rockies, situated only 500 metres north of the Canada–United States border. It was named after Forum Lake below the mountain. It is visible from the end of Highway 5 at Cameron Lake, which is within Waterton Lakes National Park, and the mountain is on the park's southwest border.

== Geology ==
Like other mountains in Waterton Lakes National Park, Forum Peak is composed of sedimentary rock laid down during the Precambrian to Jurassic periods. Formed in shallow seas, this sedimentary rock was pushed east and over the top of younger Cretaceous period rock during the Laramide orogeny.

== Climate ==
Based on the Köppen climate classification, Forum Peak is located in a subarctic climate with cold, snowy winters, and mild summers. Temperatures can drop below −20 C with wind chill factors below −30 C.

== See also ==
- List of peaks on the Alberta–British Columbia border
