= Canadian Rockies =

Mountain range in Canada

- Rocheuses canadiennes (French)
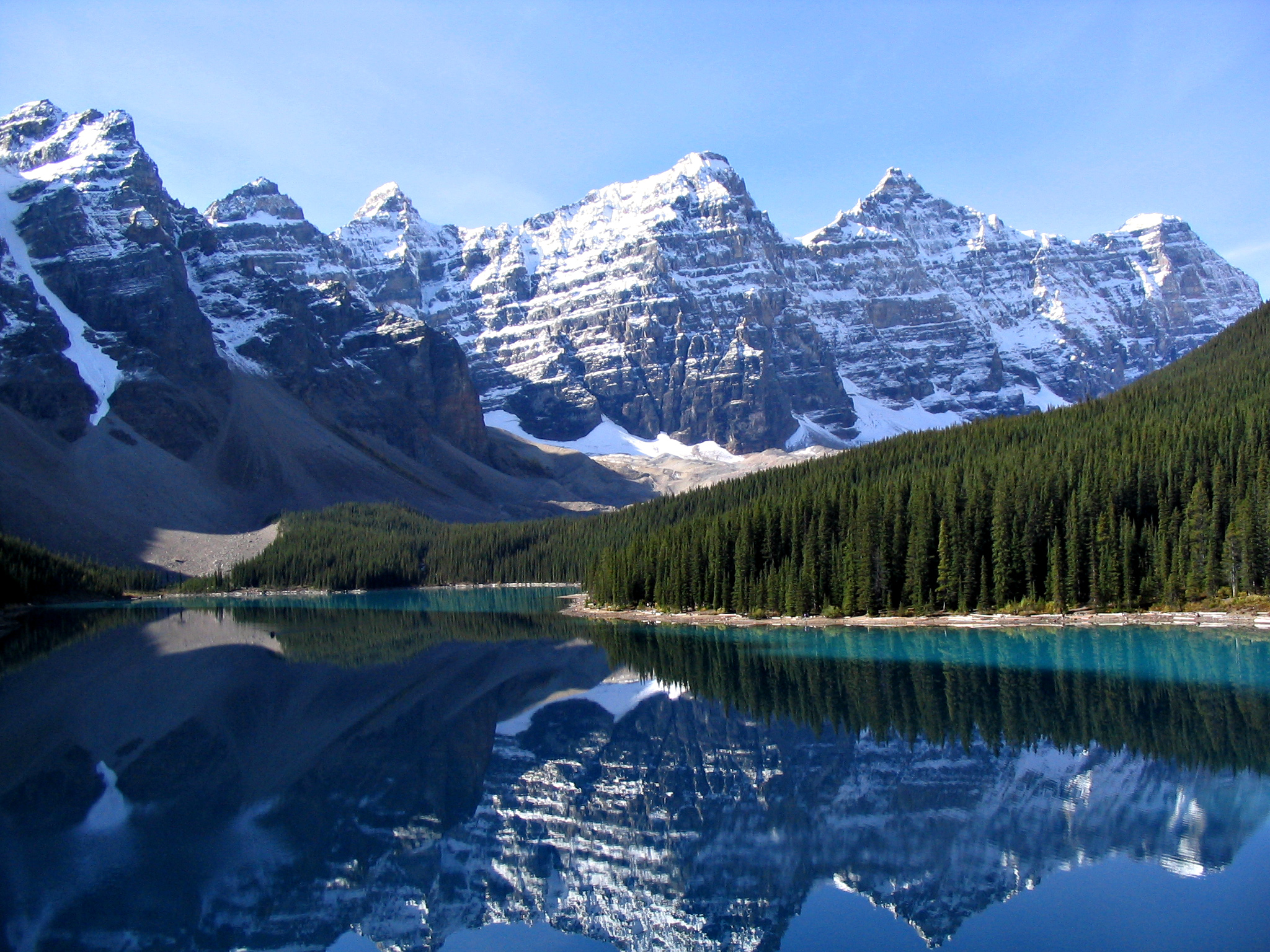
- Moraine Lake, Banff National Park

Highest point
- Peak: Mount Robson
- Elevation: 3,954 m (12,972 ft)
- Coordinates: 53°06′38″N 119°09′21″W

Dimensions
- Length: 1,460 km (910 mi)
- Width: 180 km (110 mi)
- Area: 194,000 km^{2} (75,000 mi^{2})

Geography
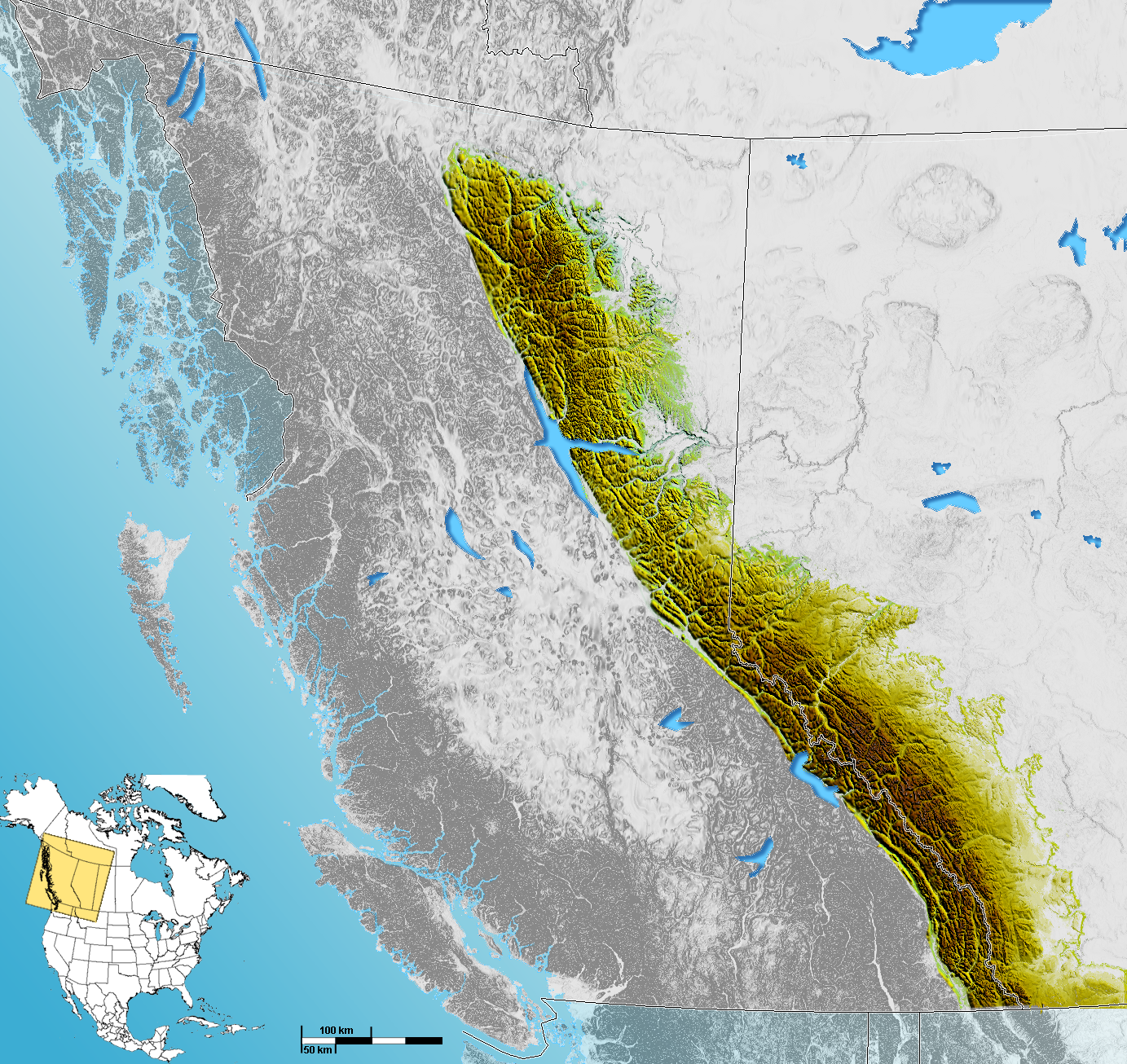
- Country: Canada
- Provinces: British Columbia; Alberta
- Parent range: Pacific Cordillera

Geology
- Orogeny: Sevier orogeny
- Rock type: Sedimentary rock

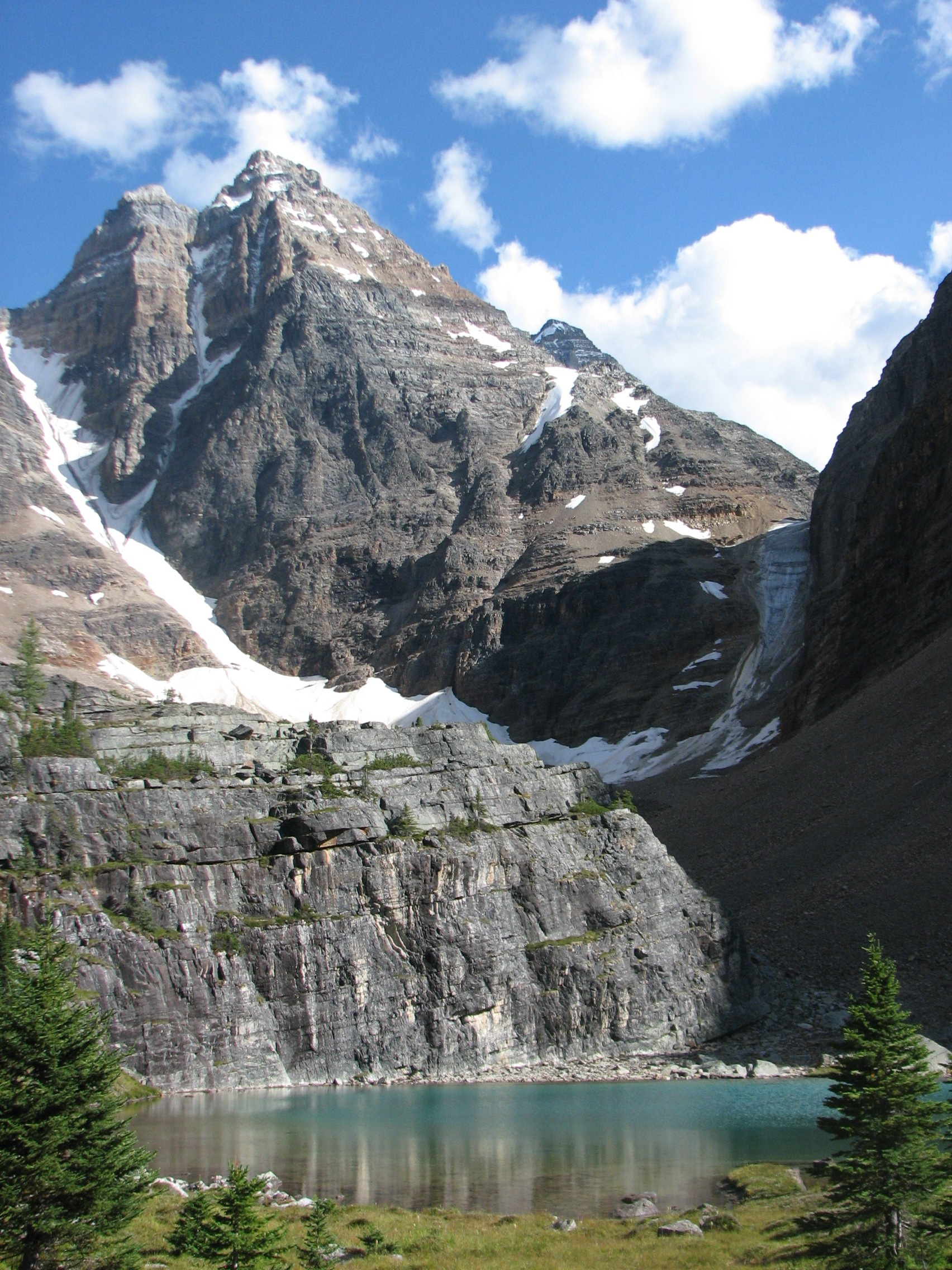
Ringrose Peak, Lake O'Hara, British Columbia

The Canadian Rockies (French: Rocheuses canadiennes) or Canadian Rocky Mountains, comprising both the Alberta Rockies and the British Columbian Rockies, is the Canadian segment of the North American Rocky Mountains. It is the easternmost part of the Canadian Cordillera, which is the northern segment of the North American Cordillera, the expansive system of interconnected mountain ranges between the Interior Plains and the Pacific Coast, that runs northwest–southeast from central Alaska to the Isthmus of Tehuantepec in Mexico.

Canada officially defines the Rocky Mountains system as the mountain chains east of the Rocky Mountain Trench extending from the Liard River valley in northern British Columbia to the Albuquerque Basin in New Mexico, not including the Mackenzie, Richardson and British Mountains/Brooks Range in Yukon and Alaska (which are all included as the "Arctic Rockies" in the United States' definition of the Rocky Mountains system). The Canadian Rockies, being the northern segment of this chain, is thus defined as comprising the central-eastern section of the North American Cordillera, between the Prairies of Alberta and the Liard Plain of northeastern British Columbia to the east and the Interior Mountains/Plateau and Columbia Mountains to the west. It is divided into the Northern Rockies (which is further subdivided into the Muskwa and Hart Ranges) and Continental Ranges, separated by the McGregor River valley, the McGregor Pass and the Kakwa River valley.

The southern end of the Canadian Rockies extends into the U.S. state of Montana including Lewis Overthrust and various sites such as the Wilson Range, Upper Waterton Lake, Boundary Creek, Cameron Lake, Forum Peak, Long Knife Peak, North Fork Flathead River and Frozen Lake. In geographic terms, the boundary is at the Canada–United States border on 49th parallel north, but in geological terms it might be considered to be at Marias Pass in northern Montana.

The Canadian Rockies have numerous high peaks and ranges, such as Mount Robson (3,954 metres; 12,972 feet) and Mount Columbia (3,747 m; 12,293 ft). The Canadian Rockies are composed of shale and limestone. Much of the range is protected by national and provincial parks, several of which collectively comprise a World Heritage Site.

== Geography ==
The Canadian Rockies are the easternmost part of the Canadian Cordillera, the collective name for the mountains of Western Canada. They form part of the American Cordillera, an essentially continuous sequence of mountain ranges that runs all the way from Alaska to the very tip of South America. The Cordillera, in turn, is the eastern part of the Pacific Ring of Fire that runs all the way around the Pacific Ocean.

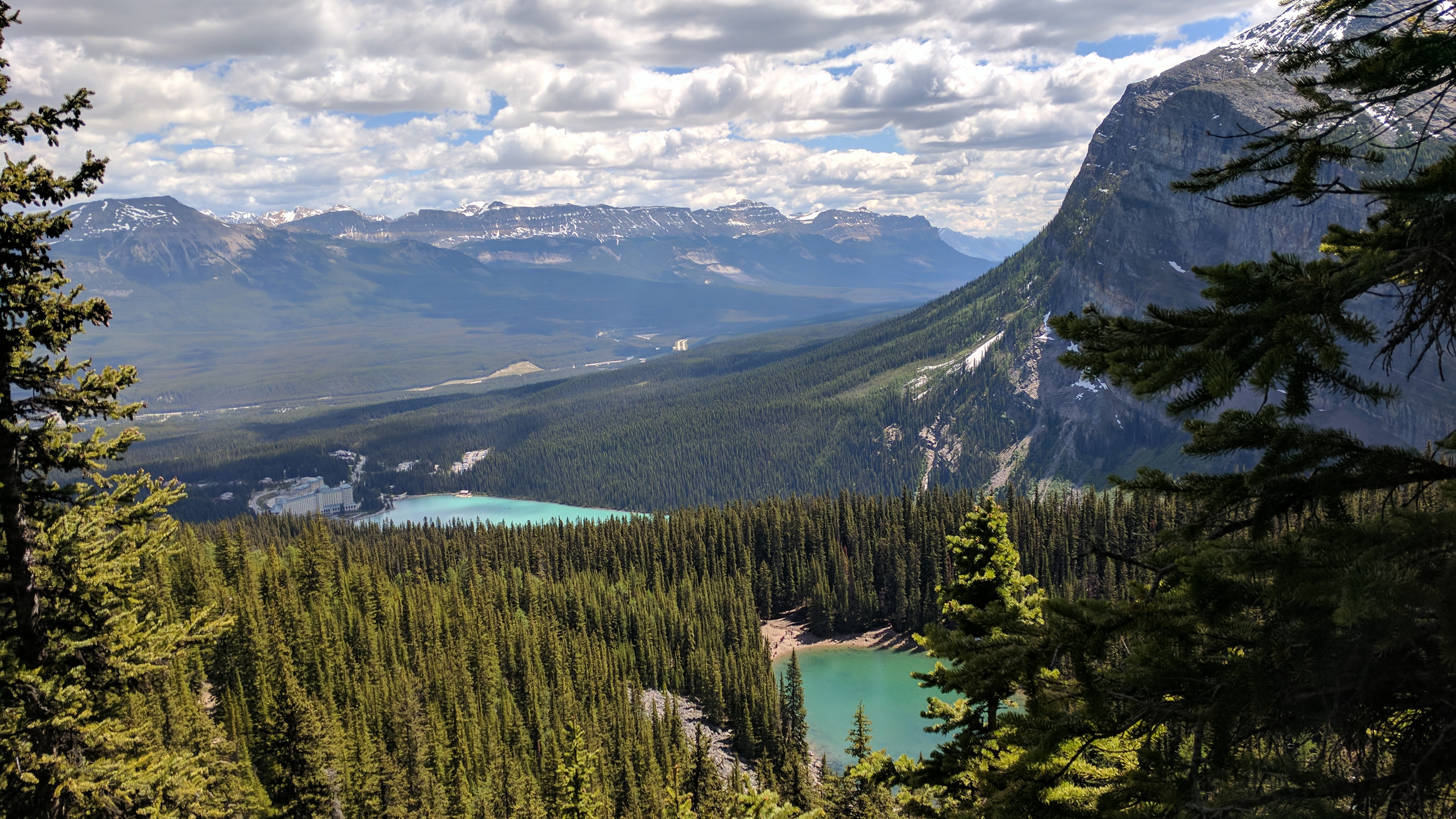
View of Lake Louise in Alberta

The Canadian Rockies are bounded on the east by the Canadian Prairies, on the west by the Rocky Mountain Trench, and on the north by the Liard River. Contrary to popular misconception, the Rockies do not extend north into Yukon or Alaska, or west into central British Columbia. North of the Liard River, the Mackenzie Mountains, which are a distinct mountain range, form a portion of the border between the Yukon and the Northwest Territories. The mountain ranges to the west of the Rocky Mountain Trench in southern British Columbia are called the Columbia Mountains, and are not considered to be part of the Rockies by Canadian geologists.

=== Highest peaks ===
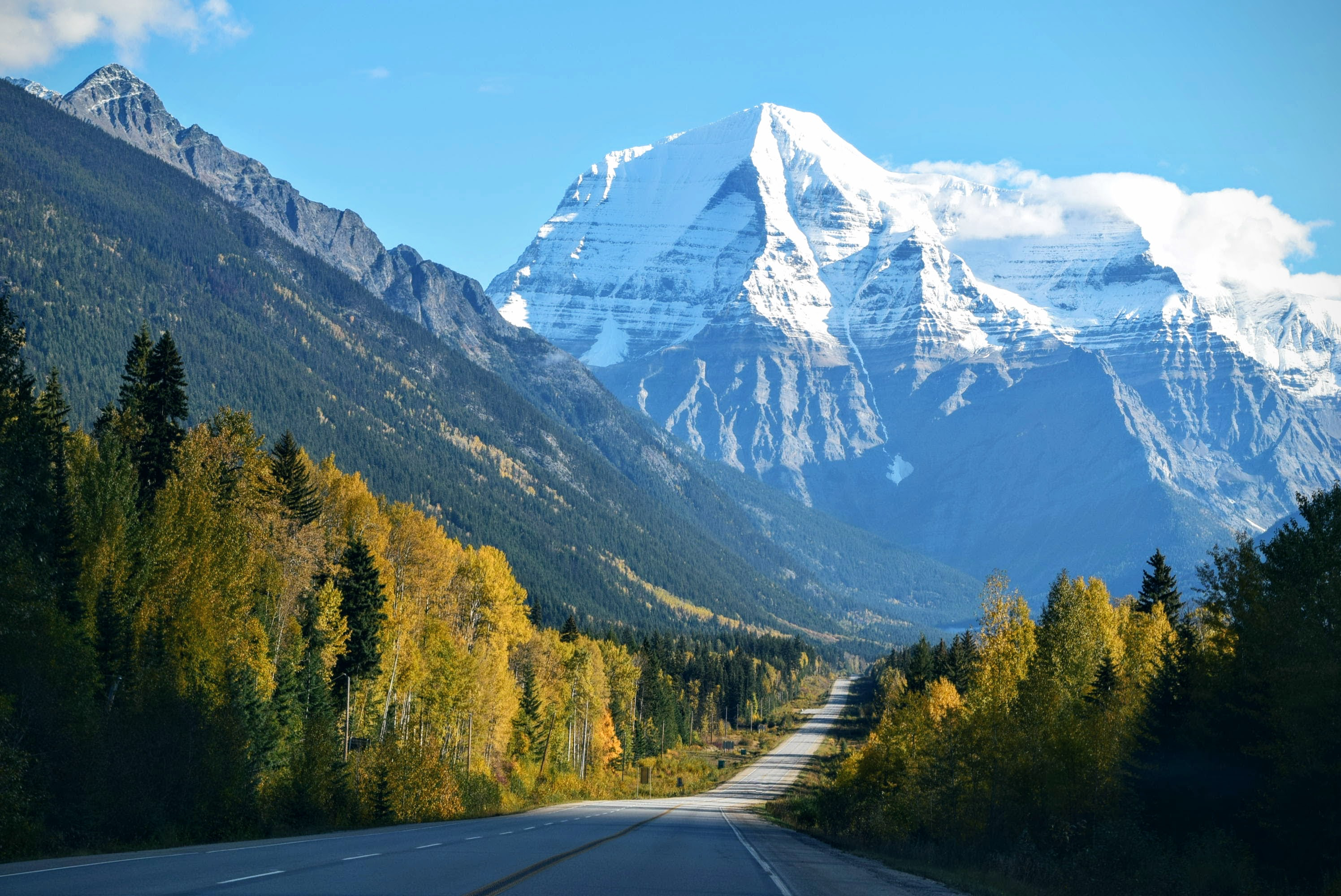
Mount Robson in British Columbia

Mount Robson (3,954 metres; 12,972 feet) is the highest peak in the Canadian Rockies, but not the highest in British Columbia, since there are some higher mountains in the Coast Mountains and Saint Elias Mountains. Mount Robson lies on the continental divide near Yellowhead Pass, one of the lowest passes in the Canadian Rockies, and is close to the Yellowhead Highway. Its base is 985 m (3,232 ft) above sea level, with a total vertical relief of 2,969 m (9,741 ft).

Mount Columbia (3,747 m; 12,293 ft) is the second-highest peak in the Canadian Rockies, and is the highest mountain in Alberta.

Snow Dome (3,456 m; 11,339 ft) is one of two hydrological apexes of North America. Water flows off Snow Dome into three different watersheds, into the Pacific Ocean, Arctic Ocean, and Atlantic Ocean via Hudson Bay.

The Canadian Rockies are not the highest mountain ranges in Canada. Both the Saint Elias Mountains (highest point in Canada Mount Logan at 5,959 m; 19,551 ft) and the Coast Mountains (highest point Mount Waddington at 4,016 m; 13,176 ft) have higher summits.

=== Mountain ranges ===
The Canadian Rockies are subdivided into numerous mountain ranges, structured in two main groupings, the Continental Ranges, which has three main subdivisions, the Front Range, Park Ranges and Kootenay Ranges, and the Northern Rockies which comprise two main groupings, the Hart Ranges and the Muskwa Ranges. The division-point of the two main groupings is at Monkman Pass northwest of Mount Robson and to the southwest of Mount Ovington.

== Rivers ==
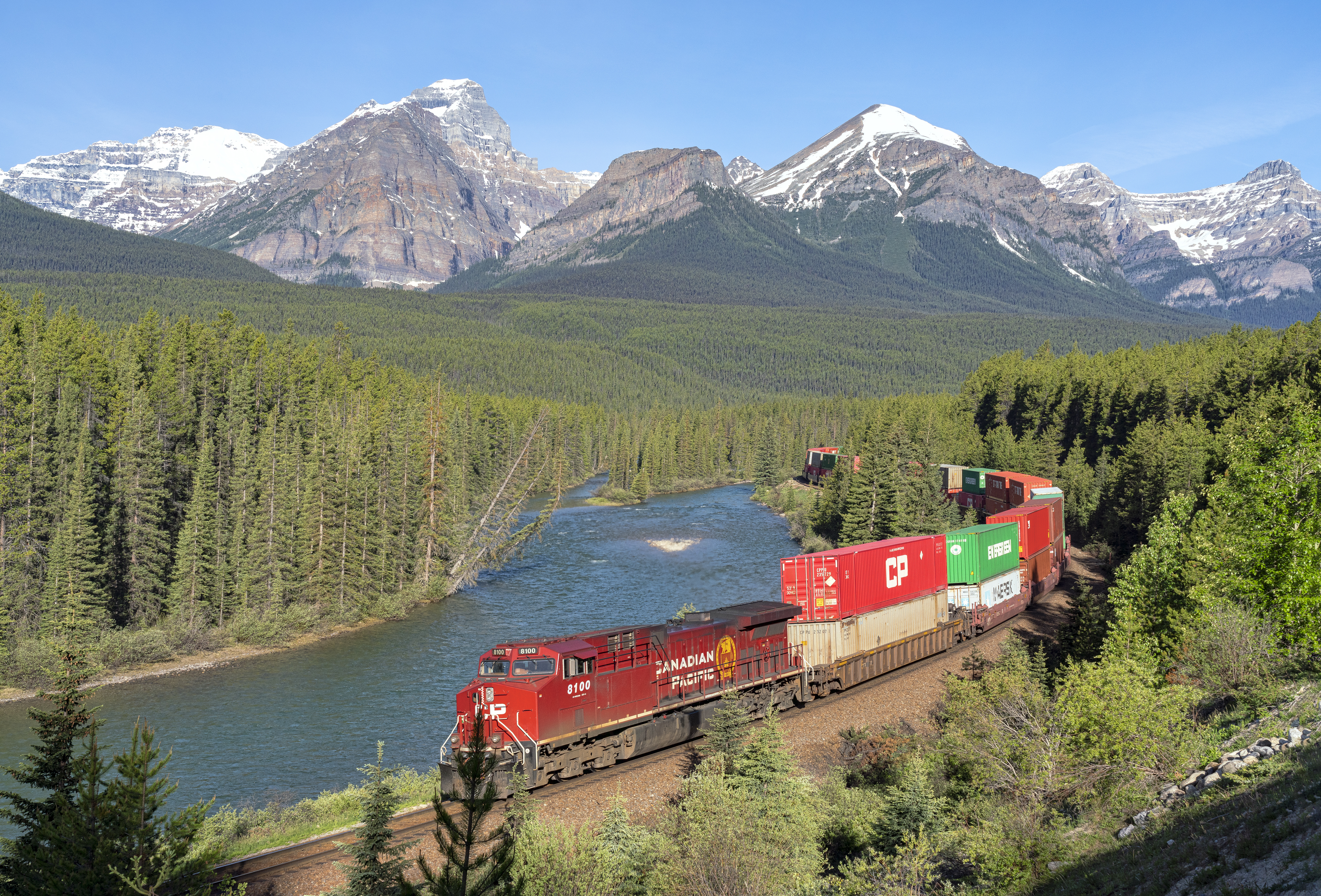
A Canadian Pacific train navigating Morant's Curve along the Bow River.

The Canadian Rockies are noted for being the source of several major river systems, and also for the many rivers within the range itself. The Rockies form the divide between the Pacific Ocean drainage on the west and that of Hudson Bay and the Arctic Ocean on the east. Of the range's rivers, only the Peace River penetrates the range. Notable rivers originating in the Canadian Rockies include the Fraser, Columbia, North Saskatchewan, Bow and Athabasca Rivers.

== Geology ==
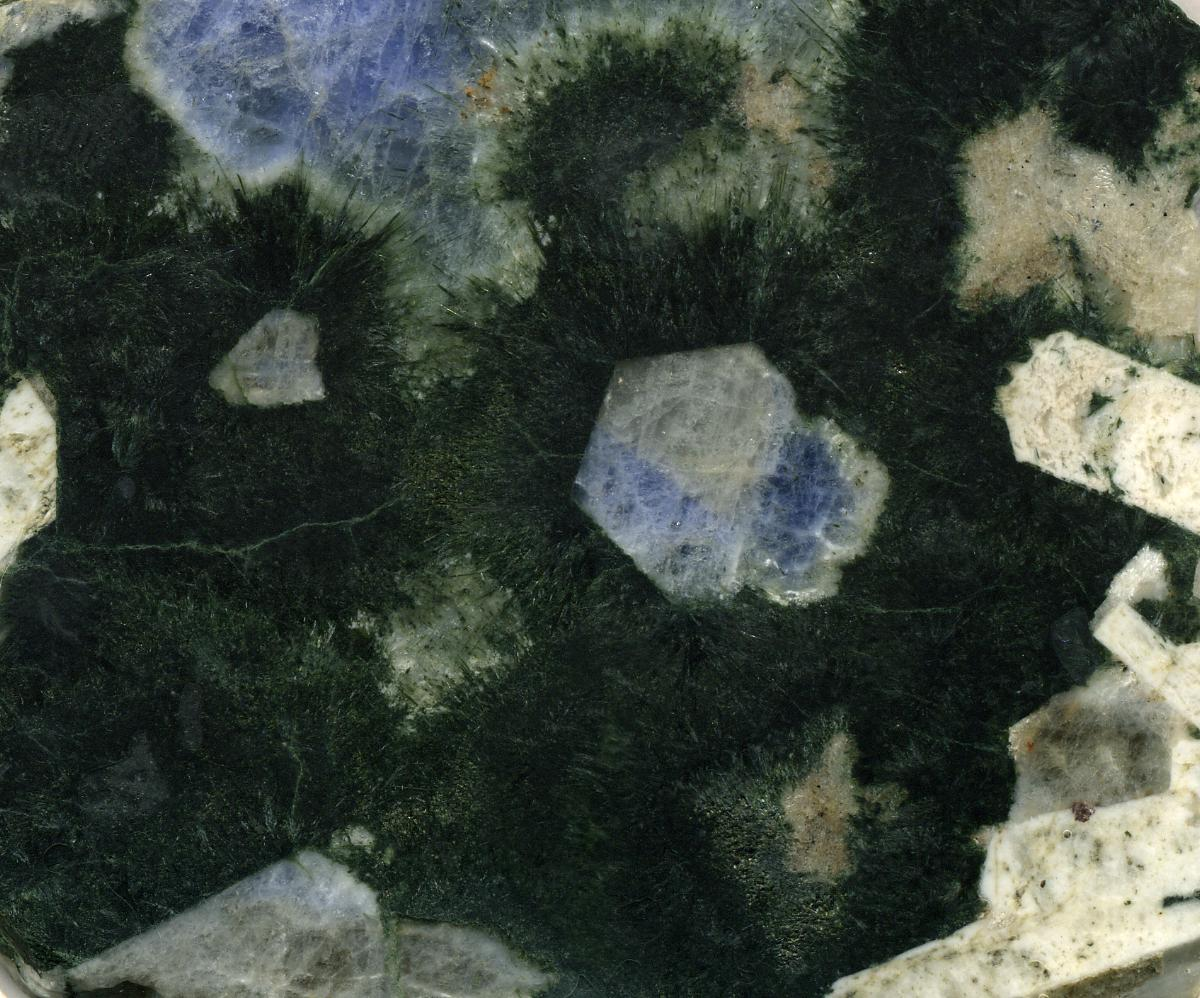
Sodalite-aegirine-albite pegmatite specimen, Ice River Complex, an intrusion partly in Yoho National Park. Field of view ≈7.1 cm across.

The Canadian Rockies are quite different in appearance and geology from the American Rockies to the south of them. The Canadian Rockies are composed of layered sedimentary rock such as limestone and shale, whereas the American Rockies are made mostly of metamorphic and igneous rock such as gneiss and granite.

The Canadian Rockies are overall more jagged than the American Rockies, because the Canadian Rockies have been more heavily glaciated, resulting in sharply pointed mountains separated by wide, U-shaped valleys gouged by glaciers, whereas the American Rockies are overall more rounded, with river-carved V-shaped valleys between them. The Canadian Rockies are cooler and wetter, giving them moister soil, bigger rivers, and more glaciers. The tree line is much lower in the Canadian Rockies than in the American Rockies.

== Parks ==
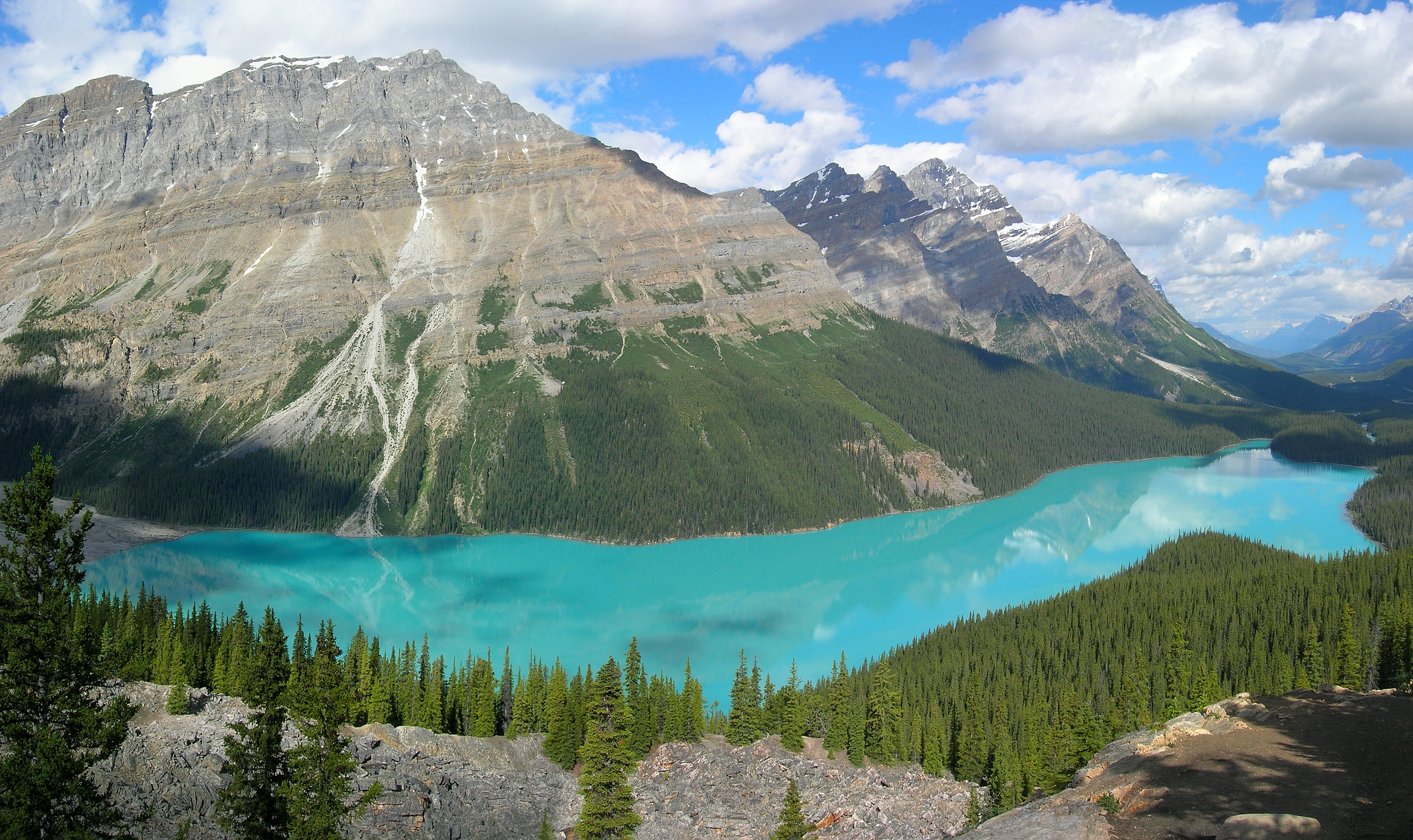
Peyto Lake, Banff National Park

Five national parks are located within the Canadian Rockies, four of which are adjacent and make up the Canadian Rocky Mountain Parks. These four parks are Banff, Jasper, Kootenay and Yoho. The fifth national park, Waterton Lakes, is not adjacent to the others. Waterton Lakes lies farther south, straddling the Canada–US border as the Canadian part of the Waterton-Glacier International Peace Park. The four adjacent parks, combined with three British Columbia provincial parks, were declared a single UNESCO World Heritage Site in 1984 for the unique mountain landscapes found there.

Numerous provincial parks are located in the Canadian Rockies, including Hamber, Mount Assiniboine and Mount Robson parks.

Throughout the Rockies, and especially in the national parks, the Alpine Club of Canada maintains a series of alpine huts for use by mountaineers and adventurers.

== Human history ==
=== The Rockies and the Canadian Pacific Railway ===
The Canadian Pacific Railway was founded to provide a link from the province of British Columbia to the eastern provinces. The main difficulty in providing such a link were the Rockies themselves: treacherous mountain passes, fast rivers and sheer drops made for a difficult railway construction process. The following articles describe in detail the political and technical feats involved:

- Canadian Pacific Survey
- Big Hill
- Field Hill
- Kicking Horse Pass

== See also ==
- Ecology of the Rocky Mountains
- Geology of the Rocky Mountains
- Arctic Cordillera: an example of another major mountain system in North America east of the Canadian Rockies.
- The Rocky Mountain Rangers

== Sources ==
- Gadd, Ben (1995). Handbook of the Canadian Rockies (2nd ed.). Corax Press. ISBN 978-0-9692631-1-1.
