= Chapman Peak =

Mountain in Montana, United States

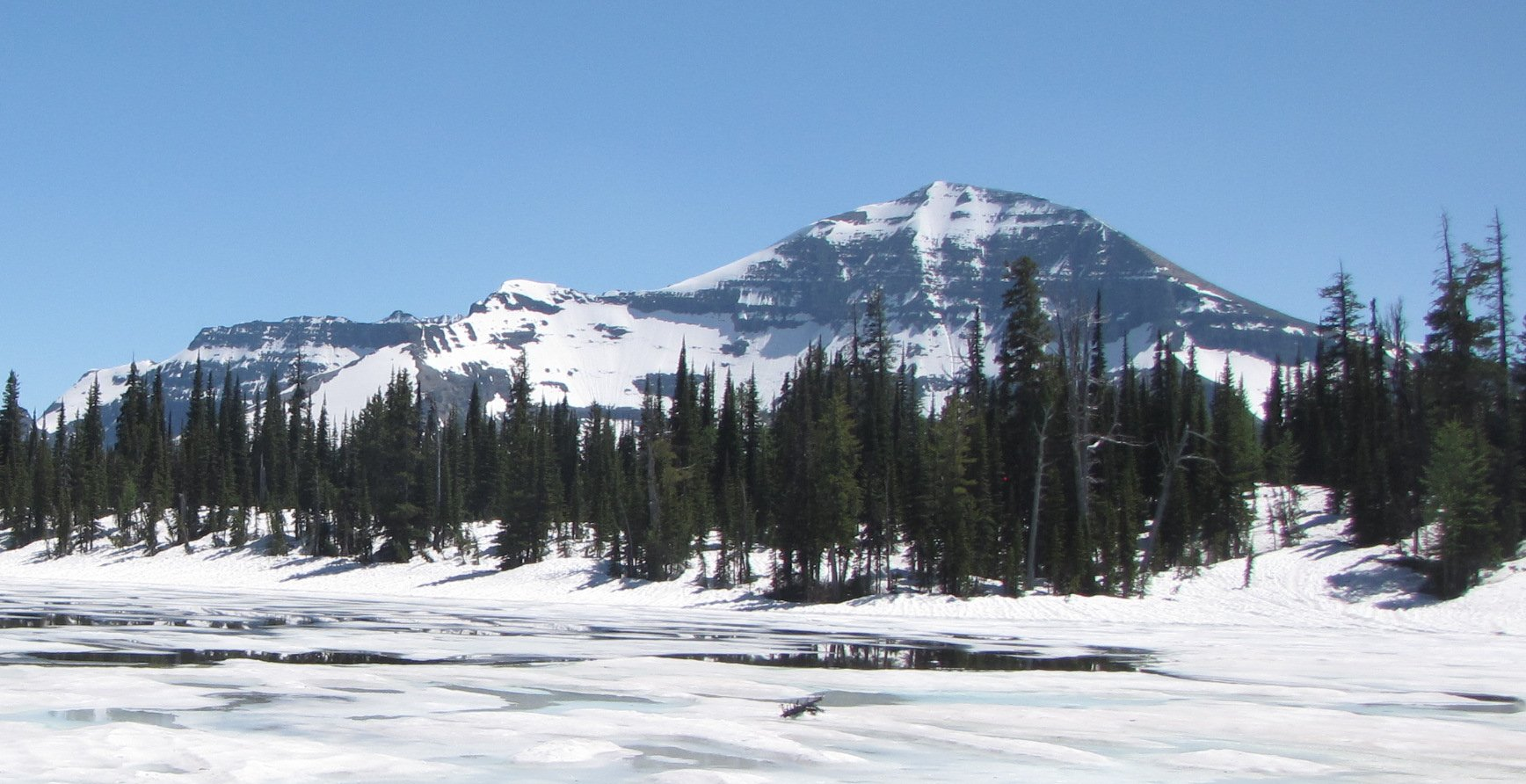
- Chapman Peak from Summit Lake in July 2011

Highest point
- Elevation: 9,411 ft (2,868 m) NAVD 88
- Prominence: 2,206 ft (672 m)
- Parent peak: Kintla Peak
- Listing: Mountains of Glacier National Park
- Coordinates: 48°57′47″N 114°01′26″W

Geography
- Location within Montana Location within the United States
- Location: Flathead County, Glacier County, Montana, U.S.
- Parent range: Livingston Range
- Topo map(s): USGS Mount Carter, MT

Chapman Peak (9,411 feet (2,868 m)) is located in the Livingston Range, Glacier National Park in the U.S. state of Montana. Chapman Peak is situated along the Continental Divide. The mountain is named for Robert H. Chapman, one of the US Geological Survey topographers who worked on mapping Glacier Park between 1900 and 1904.

== Climate ==
Based on the Köppen climate classification, Chapman Peak is located in a subarctic climate zone characterized by long, usually very cold winters, and short, cool to mild summers. Winter temperatures can drop below −10 °F with wind chill factors below −30 °F.

== Geology ==
Like other mountains in Glacier National Park, Chapman Peak is composed of sedimentary rock laid down during the Precambrian to Jurassic periods. Formed in shallow seas, this sedimentary rock was initially uplifted beginning 170 million years ago when the Lewis Overthrust fault pushed an enormous slab of precambrian rocks 3 mi (4.8 km) thick, 50 miles (80 km) wide and 160 miles (260 km) long over younger rock of the cretaceous period.

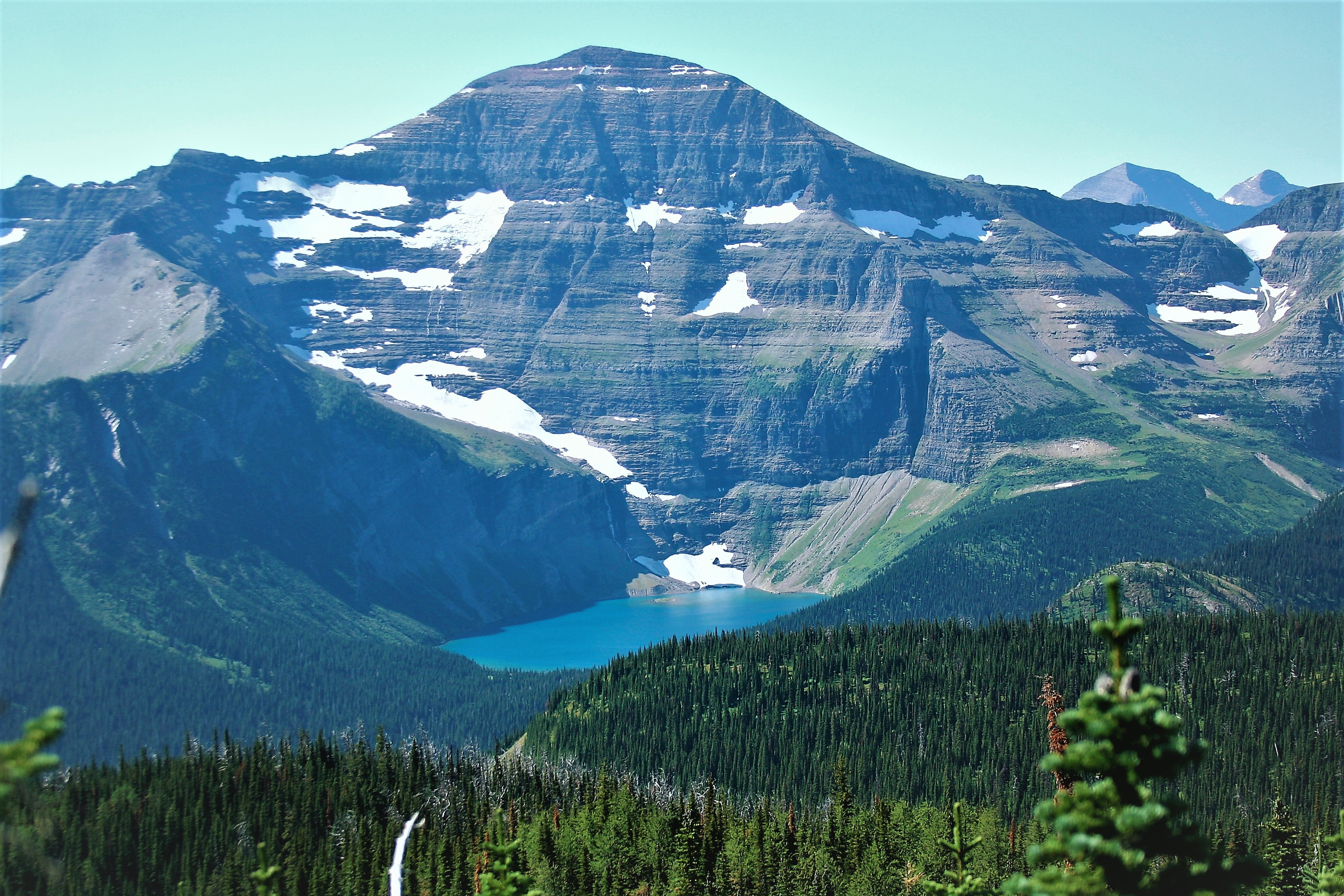
North face of Chapman rises over Lake Wurdeman
