= Cameron Lake (Alberta) =

Lake in Alberta, Canada, and Montana, United States

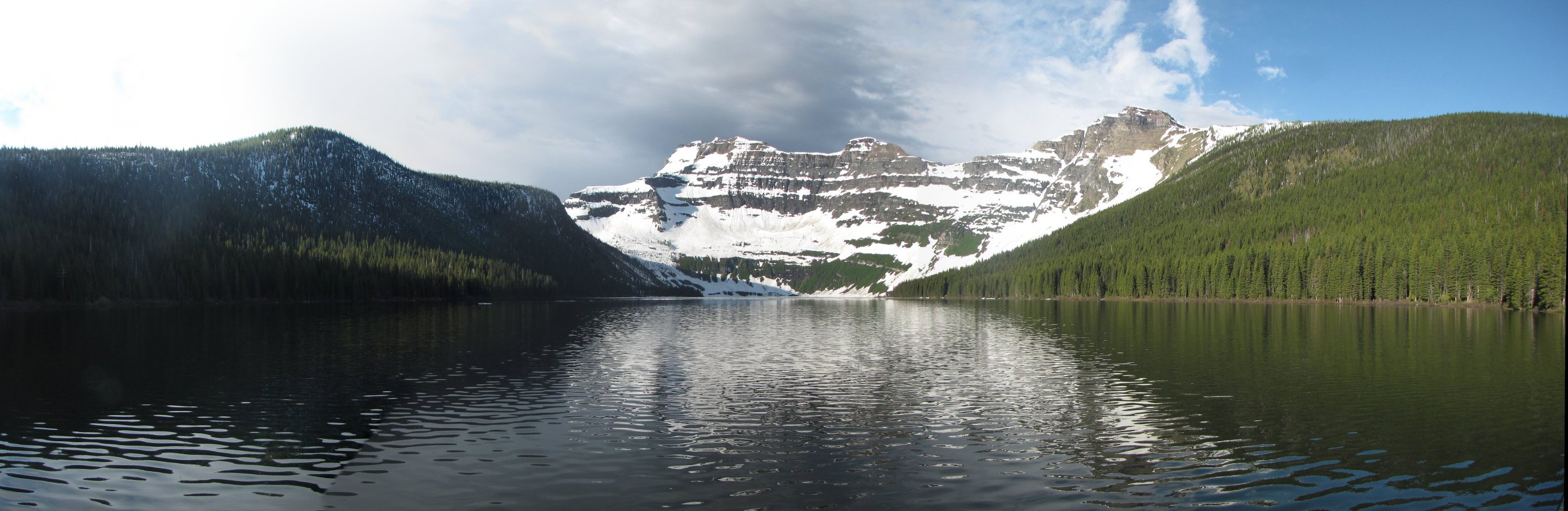
- Mount Custer and Forum Peak in the back

- Location within Alberta Location within Montana
- Location: Waterton Lakes National Park, Alberta
- Coordinates: 49°0′34″N 114°3′2″W
- Primary outflows: Cameron Creek
- Basin countries: Canada and the United States
- Surface elevation: 1,646 m (5,400 ft)

Cameron Lake is at the end of the Akamina Parkway, Waterton Lakes National Park, Alberta, Canada. It is named after Donald Roderick Cameron (1834–1921) a British Royal Artillery captain. The 49th parallel north runs through the southern end of the lake making part of it technically in Glacier County, Montana.

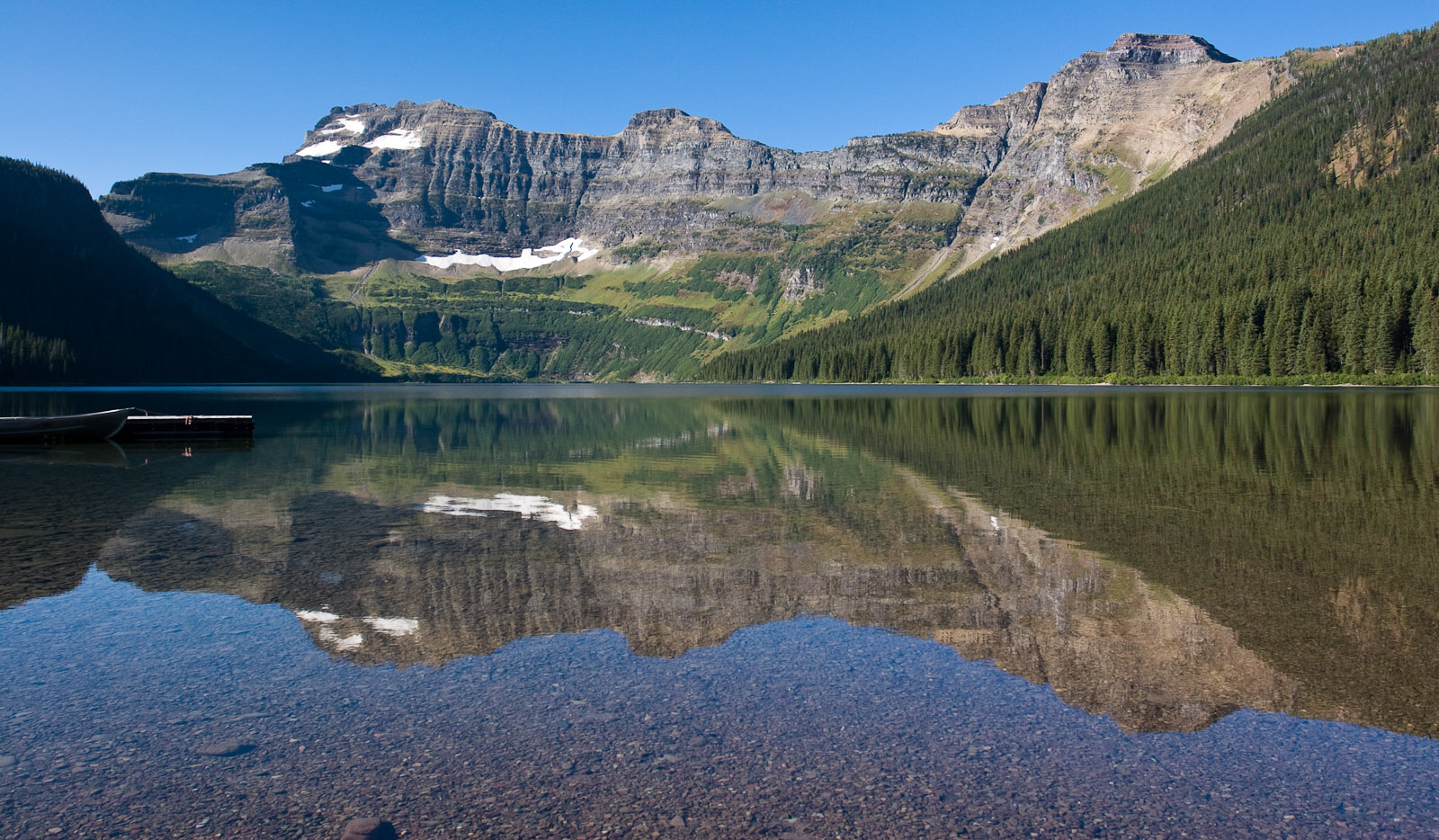
In summer

== See also ==
- Lakes in Alberta
- List of lakes in Glacier County, Montana
