= Waterton Lakes National Park =

National park in Alberta, Canada

- Parc national Waterton Lakes
- IUCN category II (national park)
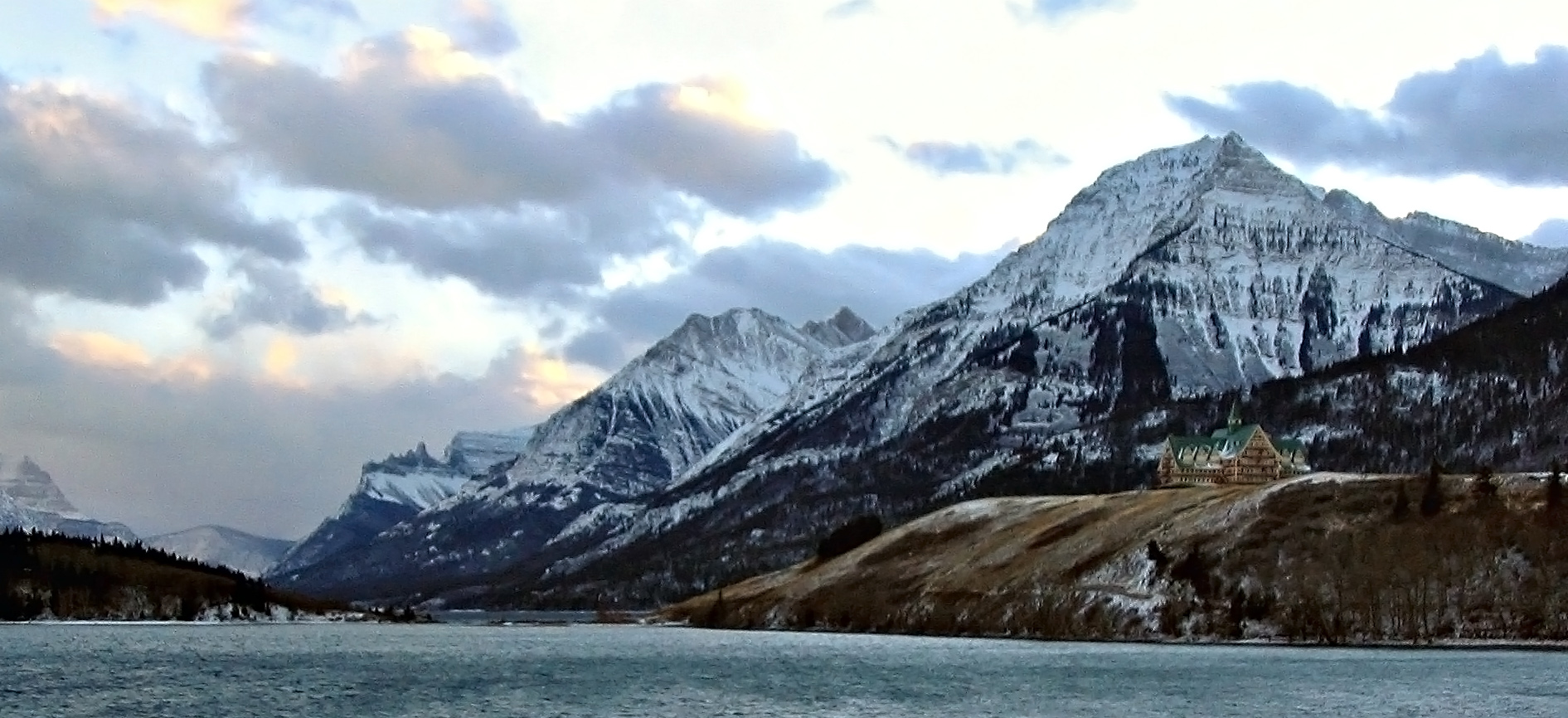
- Upper Waterton Lake

- Location within Canada Location within Alberta
- Interactive map of Waterton Lakes National Park
- Location: Alberta, Canada
- Nearest city: Pincher Creek
- Coordinates: 49°02′45″N 113°54′55″W
- Area: 505 km^{2} (195 sq mi)
- Established: 1895 (national park); 1979 (biosphere reserve); 1995 (World Heritage Site)
- Visitors: 475,842 (in 2022–23)
- Governing body: I.D. Council, Parks Canada

UNESCO World Heritage Site
- Part of: Waterton-Glacier International Peace Park
- Criteria: Natural: vii, ix
- Reference: 354
- Inscription: 1995 (19th Session)

Waterton Lakes National Park is in the southwest corner of Alberta, Canada. The national park borders Glacier National Park in Montana, United States. Waterton was the fourth Canadian national park, formed in 1895 as Kootenay Lakes Forest Reserve. It is named after Waterton Lake, in turn after the Victorian naturalist and conservationist Charles Waterton. Its range is between the Rocky Mountains and the Prairies. This park contains 505 km^{2} (195 sq mi) of rugged mountains and wilderness. It has a diverse ecosystem.

Operated by Parks Canada, Waterton is open all year, but the main tourist season is during July and August. The only commercial facilities available within the park are located at the Waterton Park townsite. This park ranges in elevation from 1,290 metres (4,232 ft) at the townsite to 2,910 m (9,547 ft) at Mount Blakiston. It offers many scenic trails, including Crypt Lake trail. In 2012/2013, Waterton Lakes National Park had 402,542 visitors.

== History ==
William Pearce, a Dominion Land Surveyor, was the first to suggest a park be established in the vicinity of Waterton Lakes in his 1886 annual report, although no action was taken by the government. In 1893, Frederick William Godsal, a rancher who resided north of the lakes, wrote Pearce referencing his 1886 report and suggested the area be turned into a park reserve. Pearce forwarded the proposal, noting the land had no value for agricultural and minimal grazing potential. Minister of the Interior Thomas Mayne Daly came across the proposal and directed a park reserve be created in the area. Finally, on May 30, 1895, Order-in-Council 1895-1621 established a 140 km^{2} (54 sq mi) unnamed forest park under the Dominion Lands Act.

While oil had been found in the area since the late 1880s, the government began approving reservation and sales of land for prospecting in 1898. In 1901, John Lineham of Okotoks organized the Rocky Mountain Drilling Company. In 1902, he drilled the first oil exploration well in Alberta on the site of oil seeps near Cameron Creek. Despite a small recovery of 34° API sweet oil, neither this well nor seven later exploration attempts resulted in production. The oil well and surrounding area was designated a national historic site of Canada in 1965. By 1905, more than half of the sections of land compromising the park had been sold or reserved for oil exploration. On September 21, 1905, Frederick William Godsal wrote the Secretary of the Interior requesting he consider expanding the park reserve for scenic and recreational purposes. The Dominion Forest Reserves Act, which came into force in 1906, established the Kootenay Lakes Forest Reserve under the authority of the Superintendent of Forestry.

In 1911, Minister of the Interior Frank Oliver introduced the Dominion Forest Reserves and Parks Act which designated all existing mountain parks, Elk Island and Buffalo Parks into forest reserves, with the authority to designate all or part of the reserve a dominion park (later national park). On June 8, 1911, Order-in-Council P.C. 1338 designated 35 km^{2} (14 sq mi) of the area of Waterton Lakes Forest Reserve as a dominion park, much smaller than expected by resident staff, and only a small portion of the original 1895 reserve of 140 km^{2} (54 sq mi). In 1914, Frank Oliver's successor as Minister of the Interior, William James Roche, significantly expanded the area of Waterton Lakes Park to 1,096 km^{2} (423 sq mi).

In 1920 William Thomson, the designer and head professional of the original golf course in Banff National Park, was brought to Waterton Lakes to design a nine-hole golf course. A clubhouse was constructed in 1928, and the course was expanded to 18 holes between 1931 and 1936. Further renovations to the course in the 1950s were designed by golf course architect Stanley Thompson.

=== Prince of Wales Hotel ===
The Prince of Wales Hotel, one of Canada's grand railway hotels, was constructed between 1926 and 1927 adjacent to Upper Waterton Lakes, by the Great Northern Railway of the United States in an attempt to lure American tourists during the U.S. prohibition era. The hotel, which opened in July 1927, is the only grand railway hotel in Canada to be constructed by an American railway company. The hotel was named after the Prince of Wales (later King Edward VIII), in a transparent attempt to entice him to stay in the hotel on his 1927 Canadian tour, but the prince stayed at his own nearby ranch in Pekisko, Alberta, instead. The hotel was designated as a national historic site of Canada on 6 November 1992.

=== Later history ===
In 1932, Waterton-Glacier International Peace Park was formed from Waterton Lakes National Park and Glacier. It was dedicated to world peace by Sir Charles Arthur Mander on behalf of Rotary International on 18 June 1932, whose members from the Alberta and Montana chapters lobbied for the formation of the park. The Peace Park was the first of its nature in the world, and was intended to promote goodwill between nations and underscore the international nature of protection of wilderness.

In terms of local governance, those lands within Waterton Lakes National Park were split between the Municipal District of Kerr No. 39 and the Municipal District of Castle River No. 40 prior to 1944. Following a partial amalgamation of the two municipal districts, remnant unsurveyed lands within the park were incorporated as Improvement District (ID) No. 11 on January 1, 1944. It was renumbered to ID No. 8 on April 1, 1945, and again to ID No. 4 on January 1, 1969.

The Waterton-Glacier International was inscribed a UNESCO World Heritage Site in 1995. In 1979, Waterton became Canada's second biosphere reserve and the first Canadian national park to take part in this UNESCO program. Biosphere Reserves are created to achieve a better understanding of the relationship between humans and the natural environment.

In September 2017, a large forest fire forced the evacuation of the townsite and park. The fire burned through 200 km^{2} of the park, destroying the visitor centre, stables and other buildings. Some 80% of hiking trails were affected and several remained closed for the 2018 season. The fire severely damaged 30% of the park, and up to 70% of the park's forested area was destroyed. However, the Waterton Park townsite and the Prince of Wales Hotel were unscathed.

== Geology ==
The oldest rocks in the park are marine sediments dating back 1.5 billion years. These rocks are composed of limestone, dolomite and igneous rocks. There are fossilized sea beds as well as salt pseudomorph. There are numerous stromatolite formations that are 1.3 billion years old.

Unlike the Canadian Rockies, whose sedimentary strata are more or less inclined, the Waterton sediments are characterized by a single overlap. The Lewis Overthrust allowed sediment Proterozoic to move as a unit, more or less, horizontally on the rocks of the Cretaceous period dating from about 70 million years ago on a remote 100 km south-east of the mountain's present location. The fact that older rocks end up on younger rocks is a rare occurrence in geology. Under the Proterozoic layer, there is a layer dating from the Upper Cretaceous which is mainly composed of schist.

Although there are no glaciers left in Waterton, aside from a few expanses of eternal snow, the landscape has been greatly shaped by the Wisconsin glaciation. The park has many examples of glacial landforms, including glacial troughs, hanging valleys, cirques, kames and eskers. Since the end of the last ice age, the Cameron and Blakiston rivers have formed two alluvial fans at their mouths.

== Ecology ==
Waterton Lakes National Park spans four ecoregions, foothills parkland, montane, subalpine and alpine. Waterton is the only National Park in Canada with the foothills parkland ecoregion, which comprises approximately 10 percent of the Park and occupies a narrow band along the eastern edge of the foothills of Alberta from Calgary to Waterton and into parts of the United States.

=== Flora ===
There are over 1,000 species of vascular plants found in the park. Over 20 species are endemic to the park such as Lewis' mock-orange and white-veined wintergreen. Over 50 species of plants that are found the park are rare in Canada such as Bolander's quillwort, Lyall's scorpionweed, and Brewer's monkeyflower. Waterton Lakes National Park is also home to small ferns called moonworts and the Waterton moonwort is endemic to the park.

=== Fauna ===
Animals that inhabit this national park include wolverines, bighorn sheep, bald eagles, white-tailed deer, mule deer, mountain goats, Rocky Mountain elk, western moose, red foxes, northern Rocky Mountain wolves, plains bison, coyotes, beavers, river otters, cougars, Canada lynxes, bobcats, snowshoe hares, pikas, hoary marmots, grizzly bears and black bears. Many bird species nest or migrate through the park, some of which include bald eagles, Canada geese, orange-crowned warblers, and MacGillivray's warblers.

== Climate ==
Waterton Lakes National Park Cameron Falls weather station has a humid continental climate (Koppen: Dfb). Summertime is mild with cool nights, while winter is chilly with highs around freezing. Snowfall is heavy, averaging 481.5 cm (189.6 inches).

Climate data for Waterton Lakes National Park Cameron Falls Weather Station, Alberta, Canada, 1971–2000 normals, extremes 1975–1995
Month	Jan	Feb	Mar	Apr	May	Jun	Jul	Aug	Sep	Oct	Nov	Dec	Year
Record high °C (°F)	15.0 (59.0)	16.5 (61.7)	18.0 (64.4)	27.0 (80.6)	31.0 (87.8)	31.0 (87.8)	36.0 (96.8)	35.0 (95.0)	32.5 (90.5)	29.0 (84.2)	18.5 (65.3)	15.0 (59.0)	36.0 (96.8)
Mean daily maximum °C (°F)	−0.6 (30.9)	0.9 (33.6)	5.2 (41.4)	9.5 (49.1)	14.6 (58.3)	19.0 (66.2)	22.7 (72.9)	22.0 (71.6)	17.2 (63.0)	11.1 (52.0)	2.7 (36.9)	−0.7 (30.7)	10.3 (50.5)
Daily mean °C (°F)	−5.2 (22.6)	−4.0 (24.8)	0.2 (32.4)	4.2 (39.6)	8.9 (48.0)	12.8 (55.0)	16.0 (60.8)	15.4 (59.7)	11.0 (51.8)	6.2 (43.2)	−1.2 (29.8)	−4.7 (23.5)	5.0 (41.0)
Mean daily minimum °C (°F)	−9.7 (14.5)	−8.9 (16.0)	−4.9 (23.2)	−1.1 (30.0)	3.1 (37.6)	6.5 (43.7)	9.3 (48.7)	8.8 (47.8)	4.9 (40.8)	1.2 (34.2)	−5.0 (23.0)	−8.8 (16.2)	−0.4 (31.3)
Record low °C (°F)	−38.0 (−36.4)	−37.0 (−34.6)	−30.6 (−23.1)	−22.8 (−9.0)	−7.0 (19.4)	−1.0 (30.2)	0.5 (32.9)	−4.0 (24.8)	−8.0 (17.6)	−23.0 (−9.4)	−33.0 (−27.4)	−37.0 (−34.6)	−38.0 (−36.4)
Average precipitation mm (inches)	82.2 (3.24)	74.6 (2.94)	89.7 (3.53)	89.9 (3.54)	121.3 (4.78)	109.8 (4.32)	80.0 (3.15)	75.2 (2.96)	73.2 (2.88)	101.5 (4.00)	115.7 (4.56)	90.2 (3.55)	1,103.2 (43.43)
Average rainfall mm (inches)	17.7 (0.70)	14.6 (0.57)	16.4 (0.65)	39.2 (1.54)	107.1 (4.22)	109.8 (4.32)	80.0 (3.15)	72.6 (2.86)	67.1 (2.64)	60.3 (2.37)	45.2 (1.78)	18.5 (0.73)	648.4 (25.53)
Average snowfall cm (inches)	67.1 (26.4)	65.9 (25.9)	80.5 (31.7)	49.7 (19.6)	13.3 (5.2)	0.0 (0.0)	0.0 (0.0)	2.5 (1.0)	5.6 (2.2)	43.4 (17.1)	74.8 (29.4)	78.8 (31.0)	481.5 (189.6)
Average precipitation days (≥ 0.2 mm)	12.9	11.7	13.1	11.9	15.6	15.5	12.0	13.4	11.9	12.1	14.3	13.0	157.3
Average rainy days (≥ 0.2 mm)	2.4	2.3	2.7	6.4	14.9	15.5	12.0	13.2	11.4	8.8	5.7	2.6	97.8
Average snowy days (≥ 0.2 mm)	10.7	9.8	10.5	6.5	1.7	0.0	0.0	0.14	1.0	4.0	10.1	10.9	65.2
Source: Environment Canada

== Biosphere Reserve ==
In 1979, Waterton and bordering Glacier National park in the US were designated as World Biosphere reserves, preserving mountains, prairie, lakes and freshwater wetlands ecosystems. Habitats represented in the parks' range include: prairie grasslands, aspen grove forests, alpine tundra/high meadows, lower subalpine forests, deciduous and coniferous forests.

== World Heritage Site ==
The park is part of the Waterton-Glacier International Peace Park, designated as World Heritage Site in 1995 for their distinctive climate, physiographic setting, mountain-prairie interface, and tri-ocean hydrographical divide. They are areas of significant scenic values with abundant and diverse flora and fauna.

== Photo gallery ==
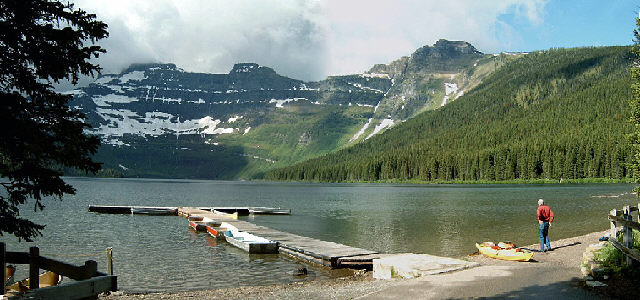
Cameron Lake

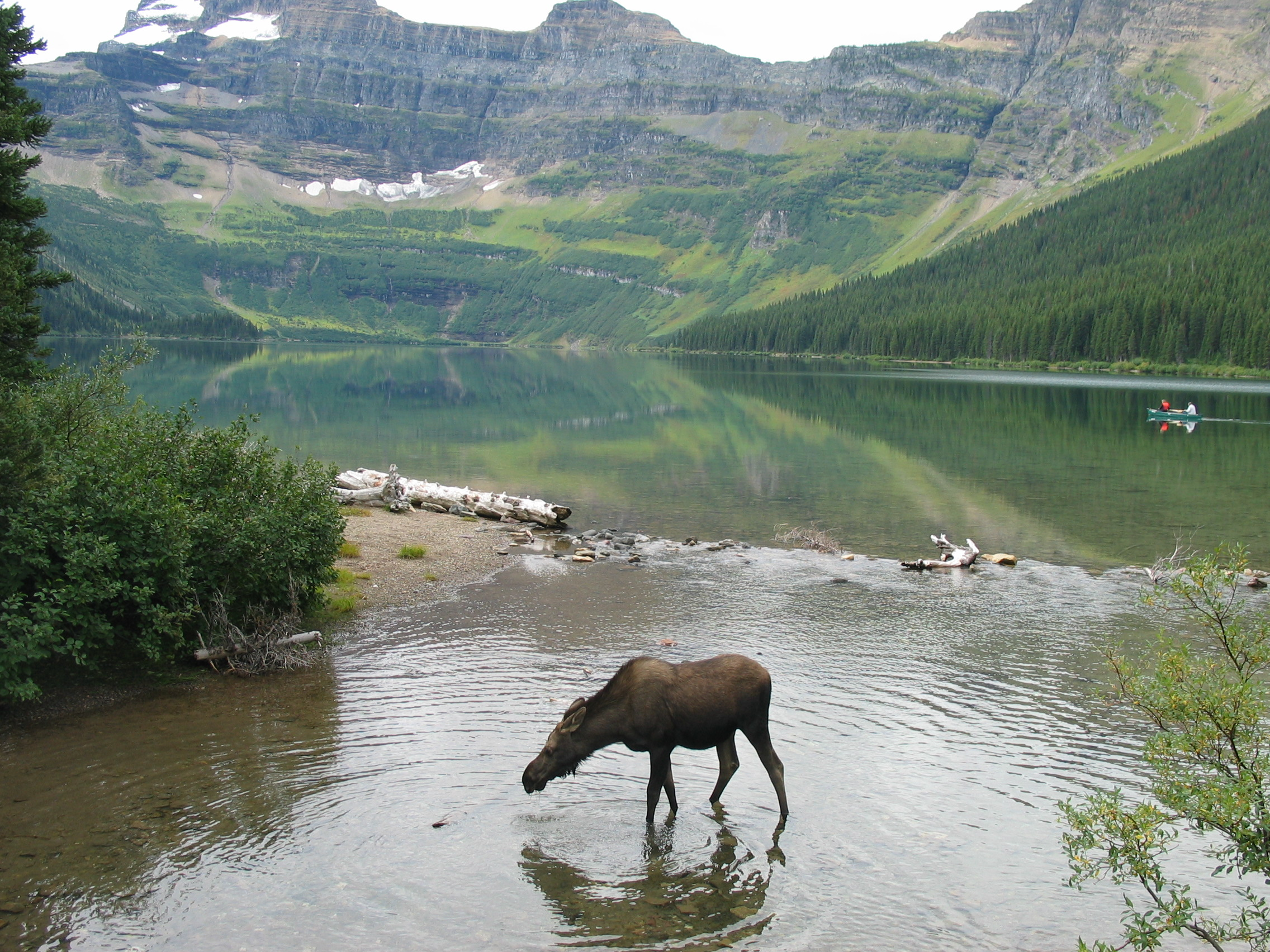
Moose at Cameron Lake

View from top of Summit Trail

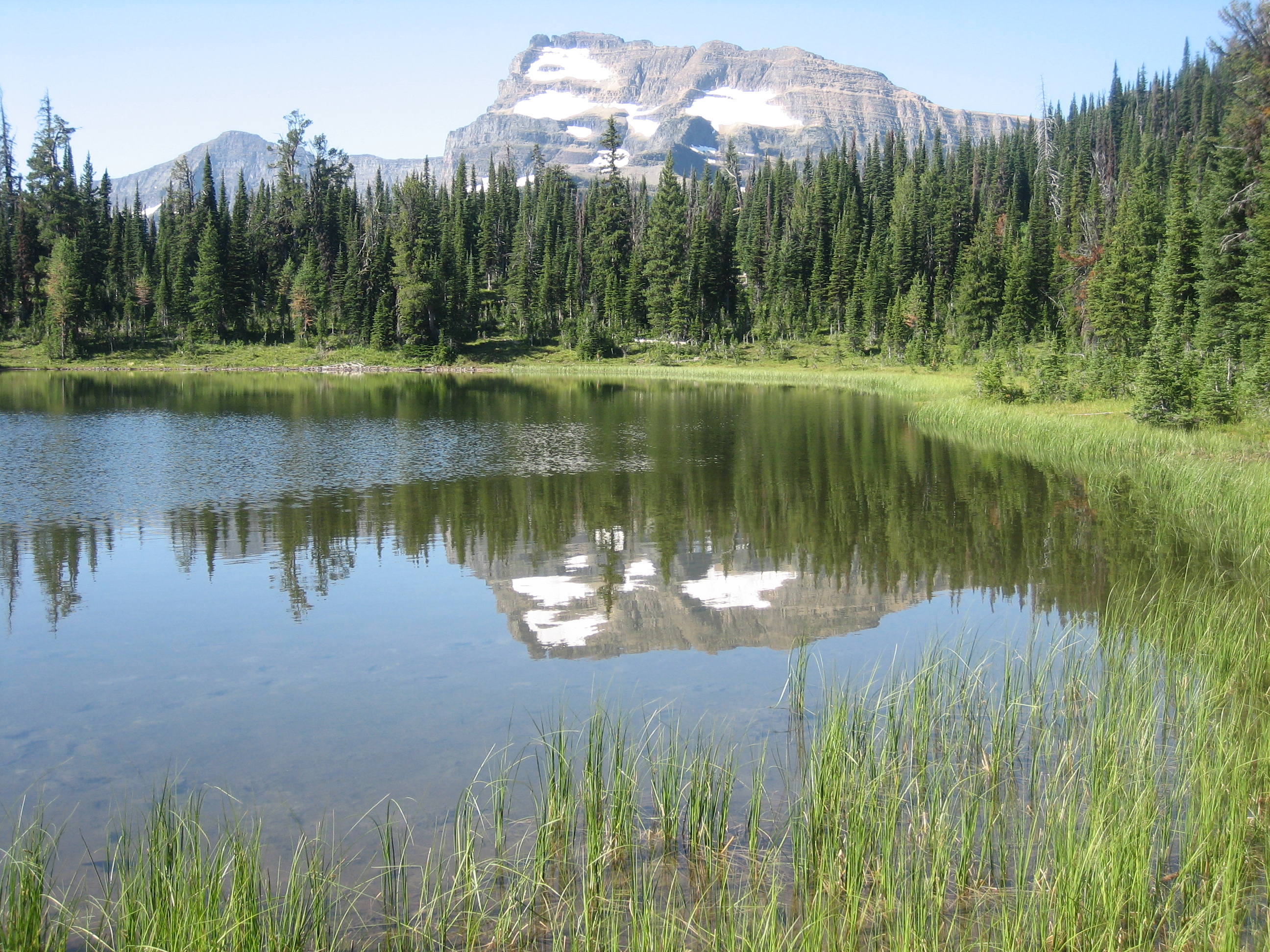
Summit Lake

Panorama taken from Prince of Wales hotel looking south

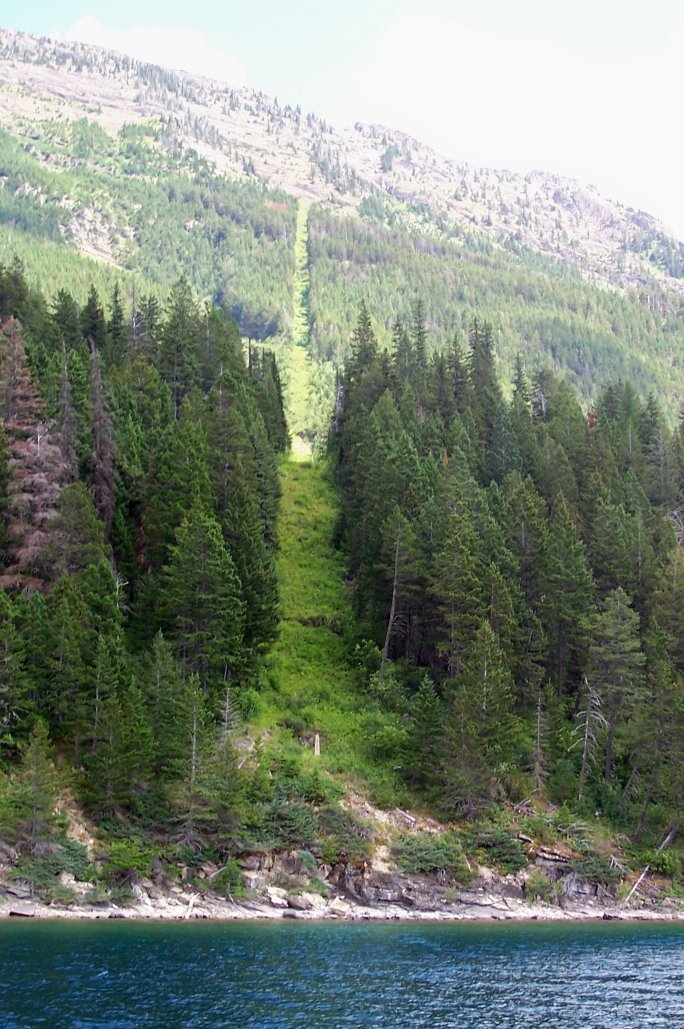
49th parallel at Waterton Lake

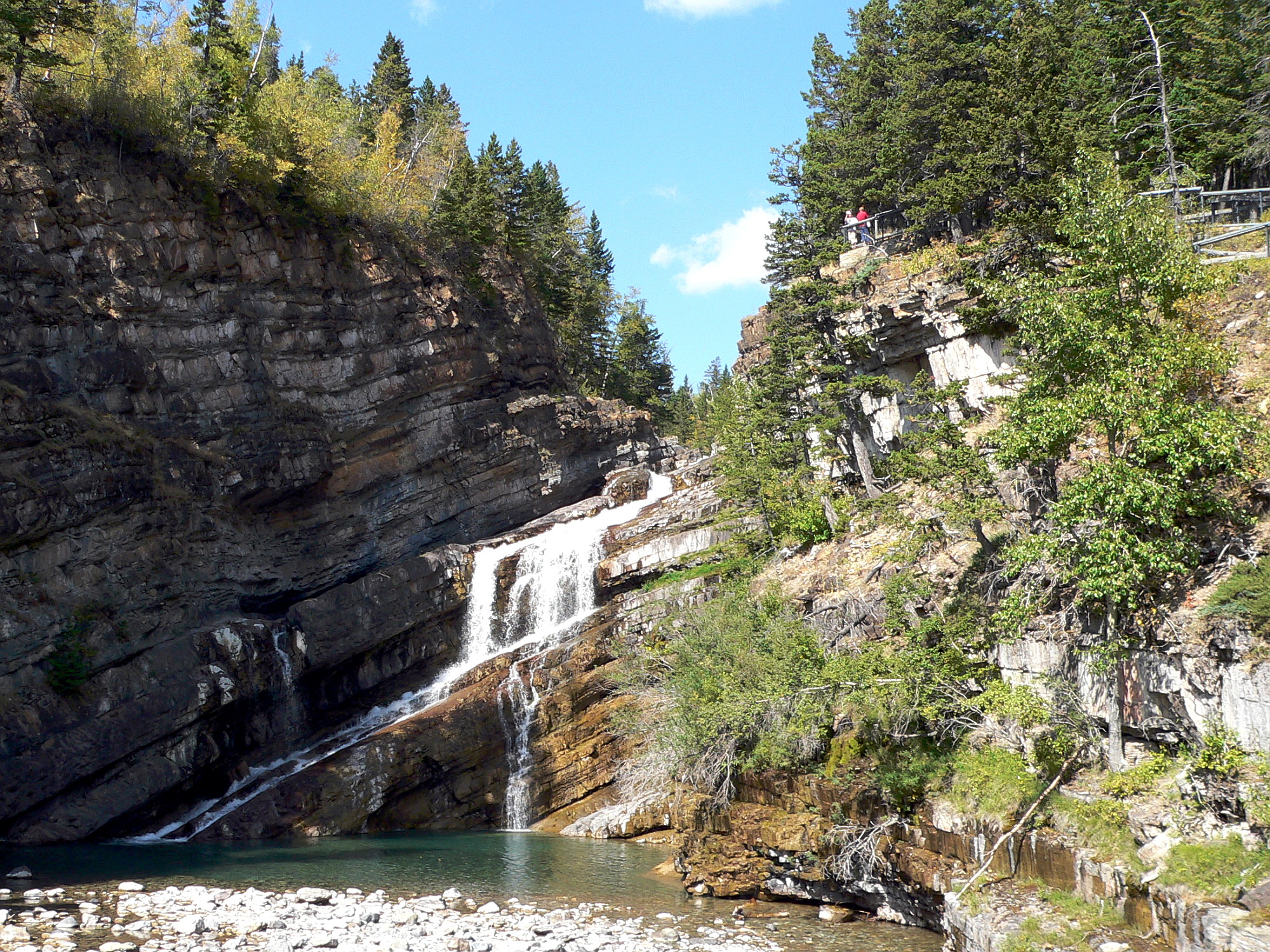
Cameron Falls

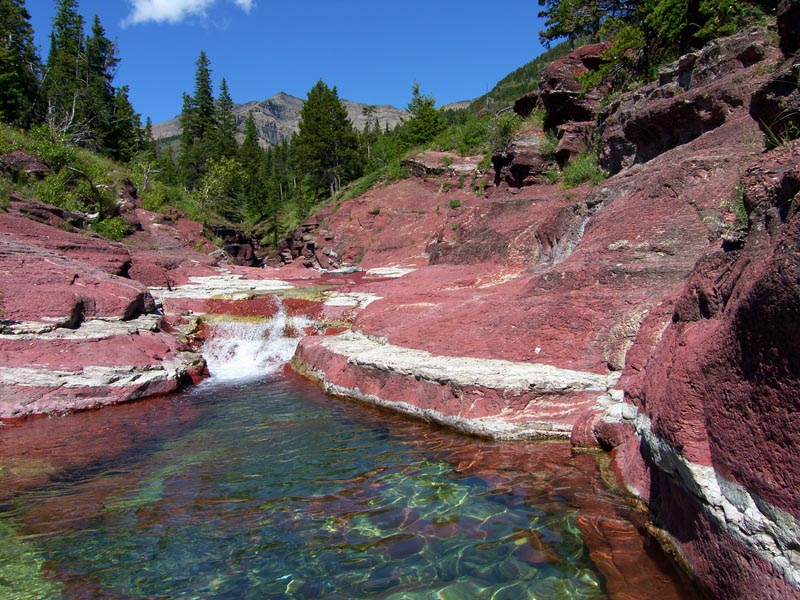
Red Rock Canyon

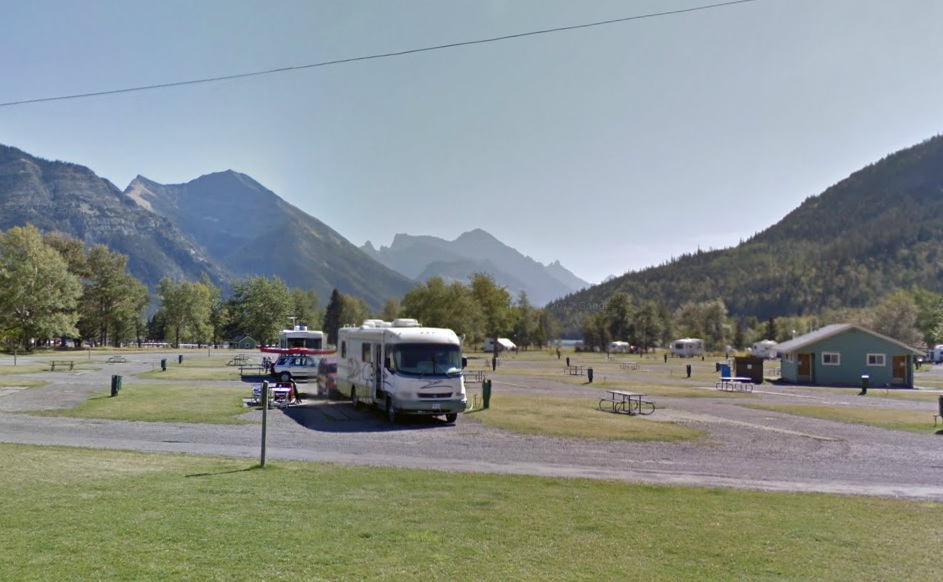
Waterton Park townsite campground

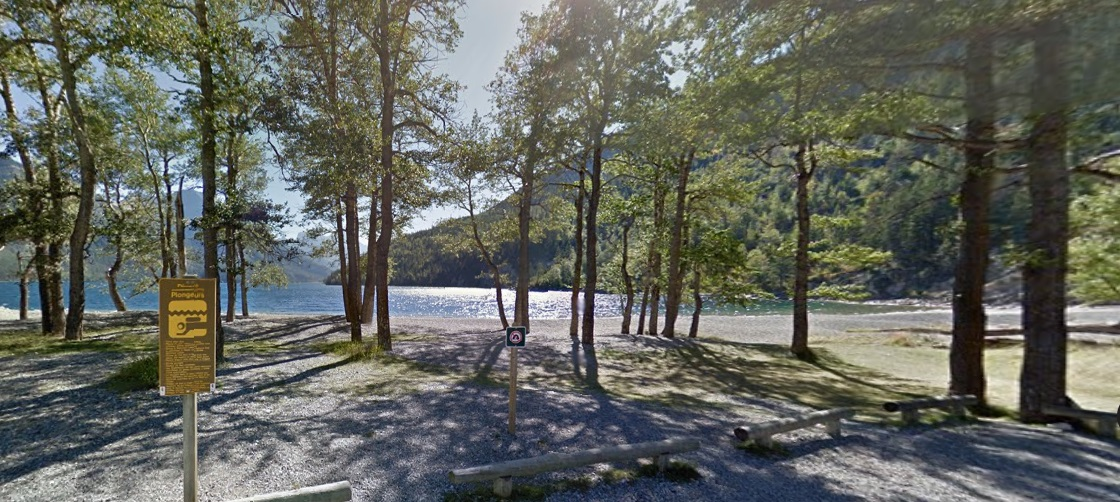
South Beach of Waterton Park townsite

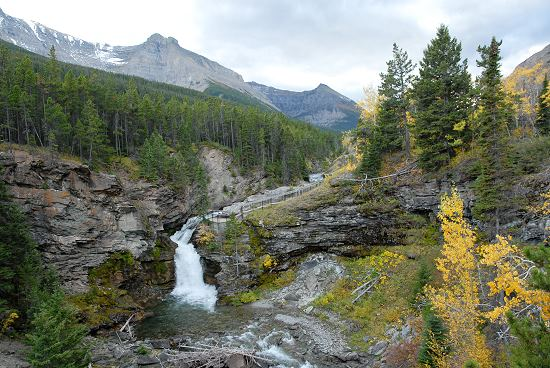
Blakiston Falls (upper)

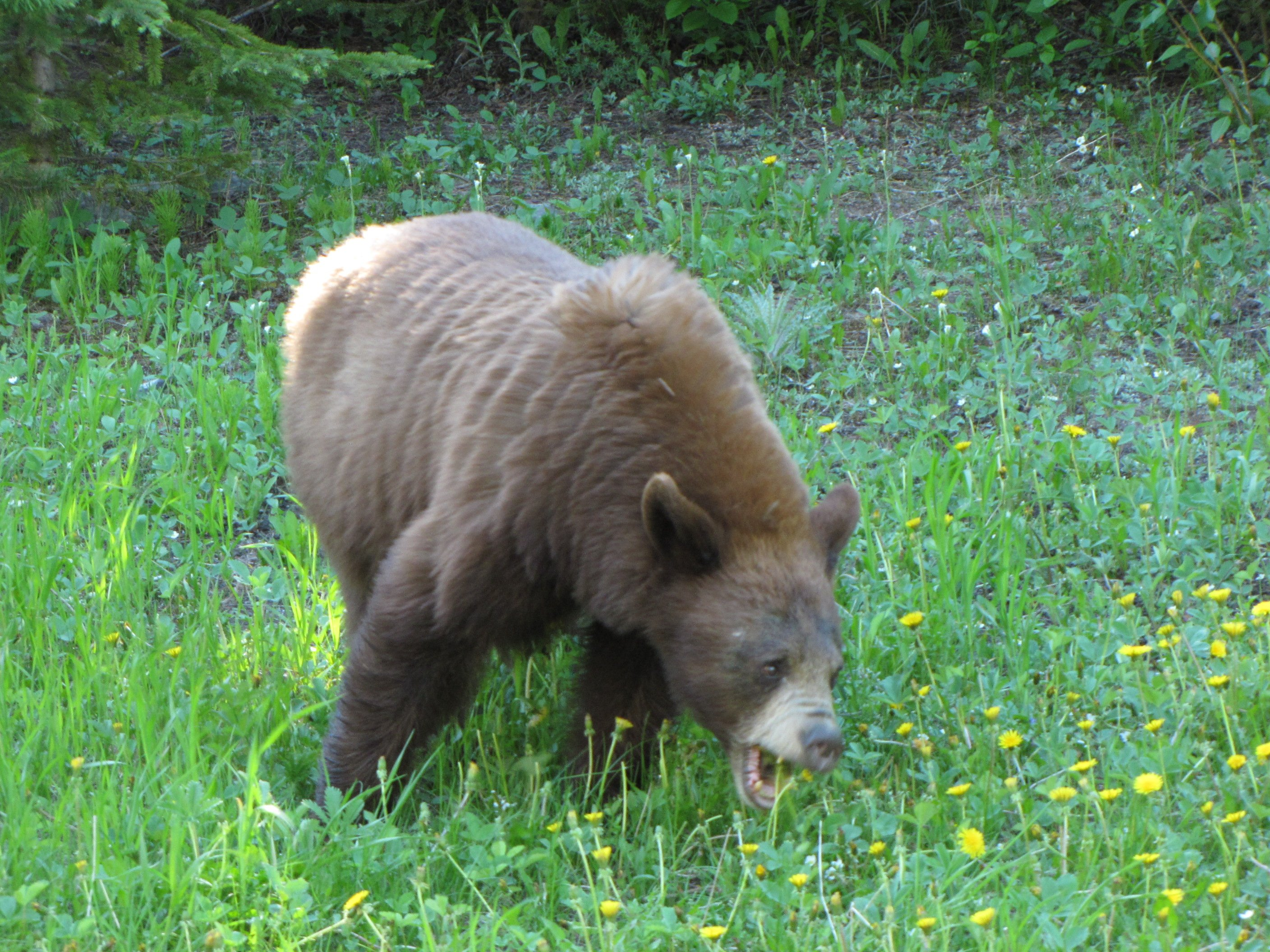
Cinnamon-coloured black bear eating dandelions, in Akamina Parkway.

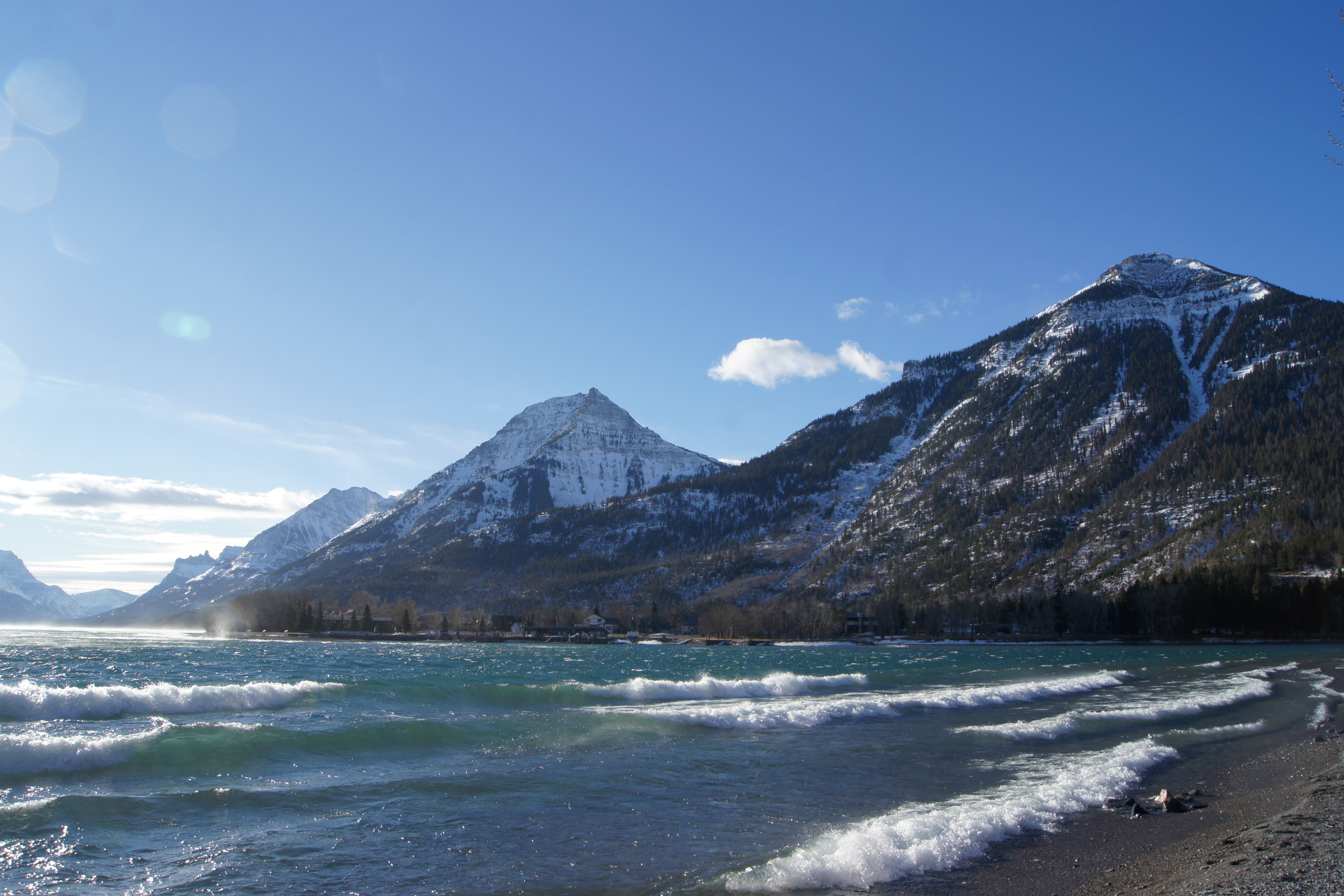
View of the mountains surrounding the Waterton Lake

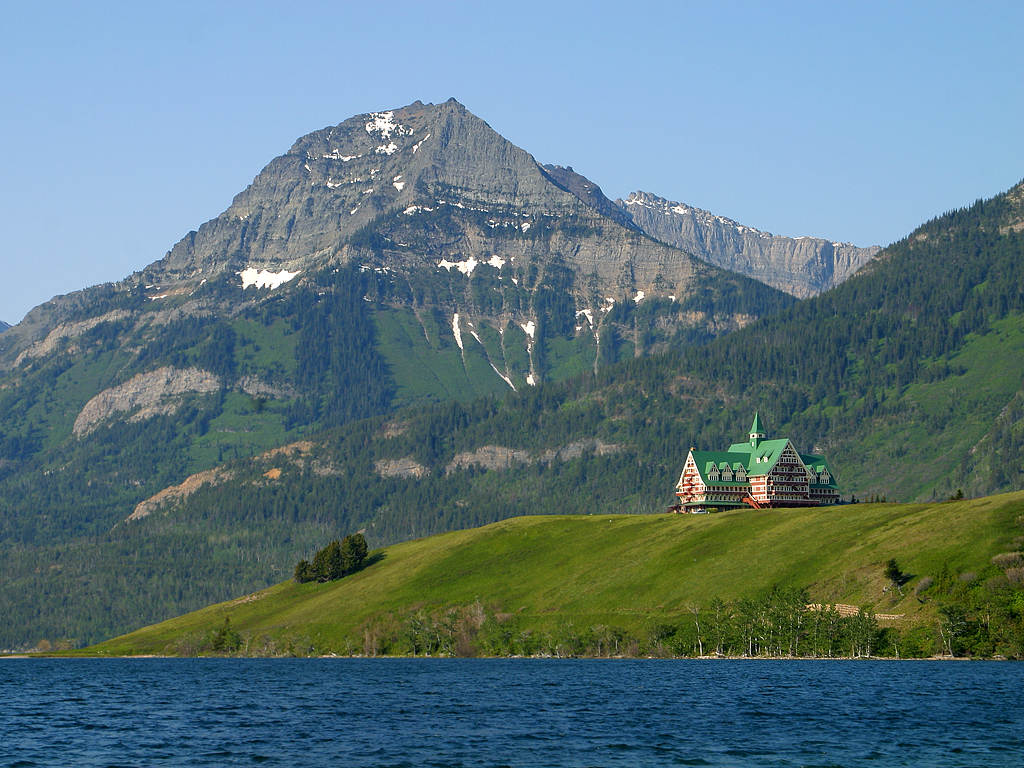
Prince of Wales Hotel with Mount Richards

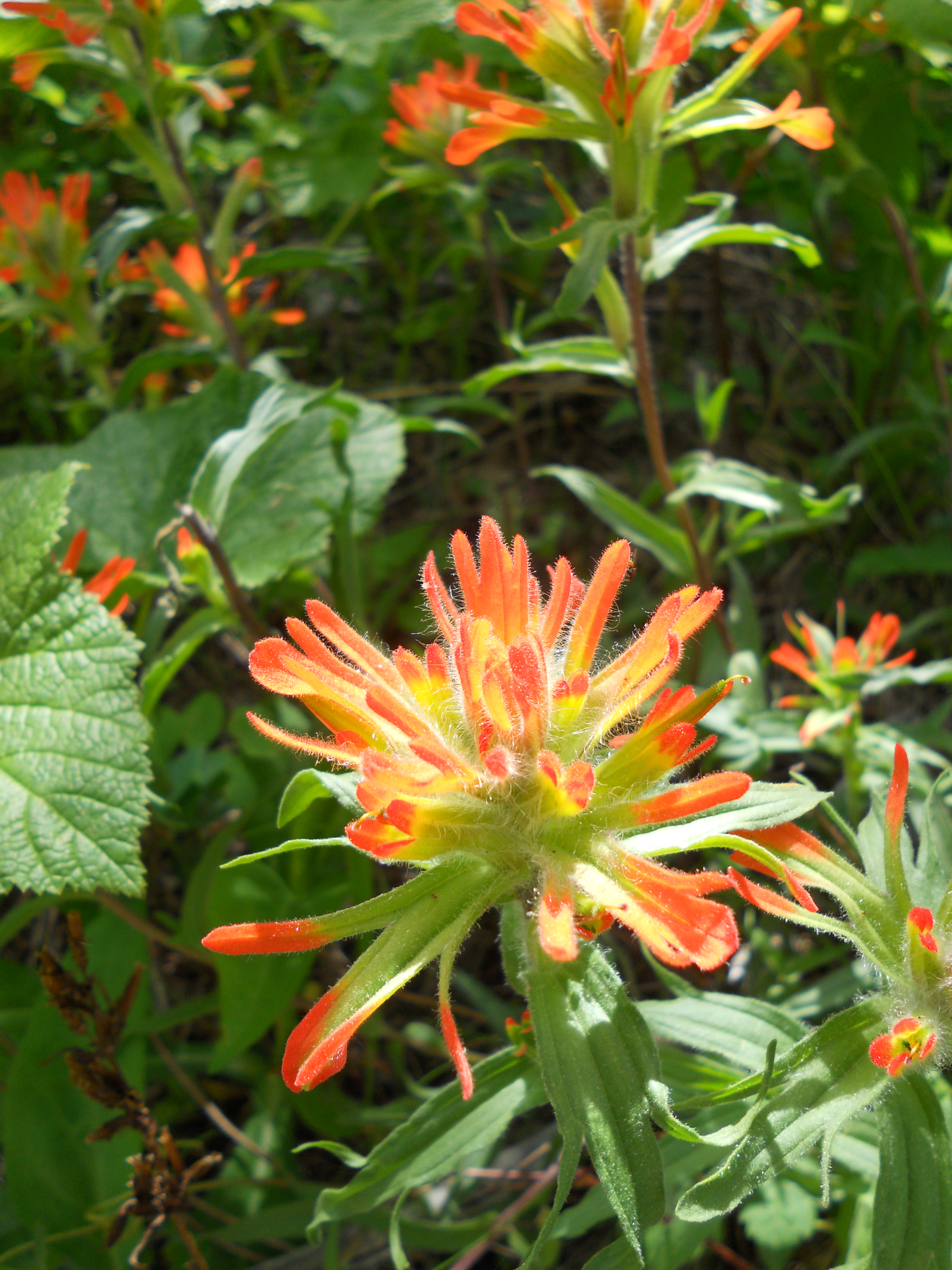
Castilleja (Indian paintbrush) on the Bear's Hump

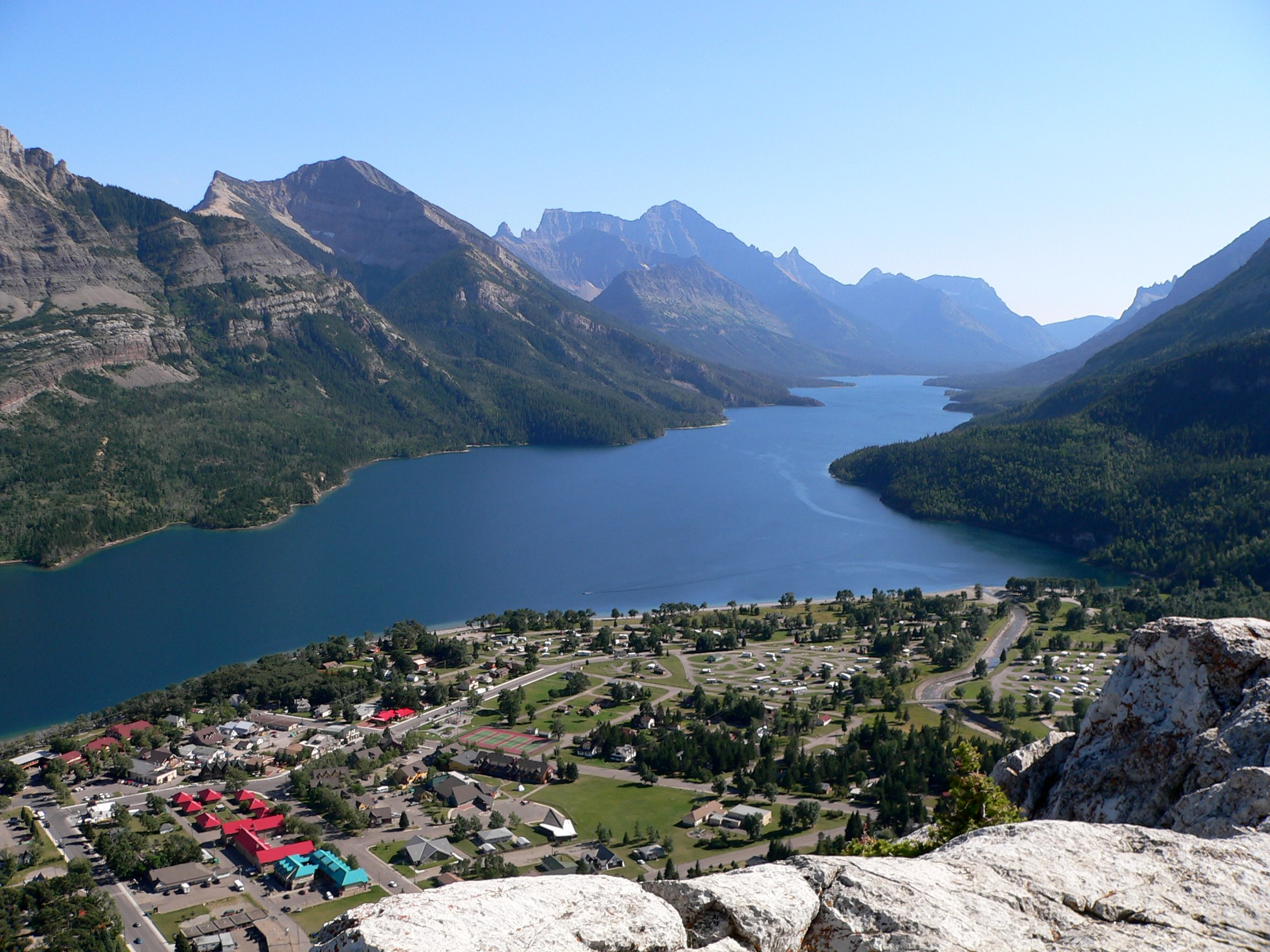
View from Bears Hump

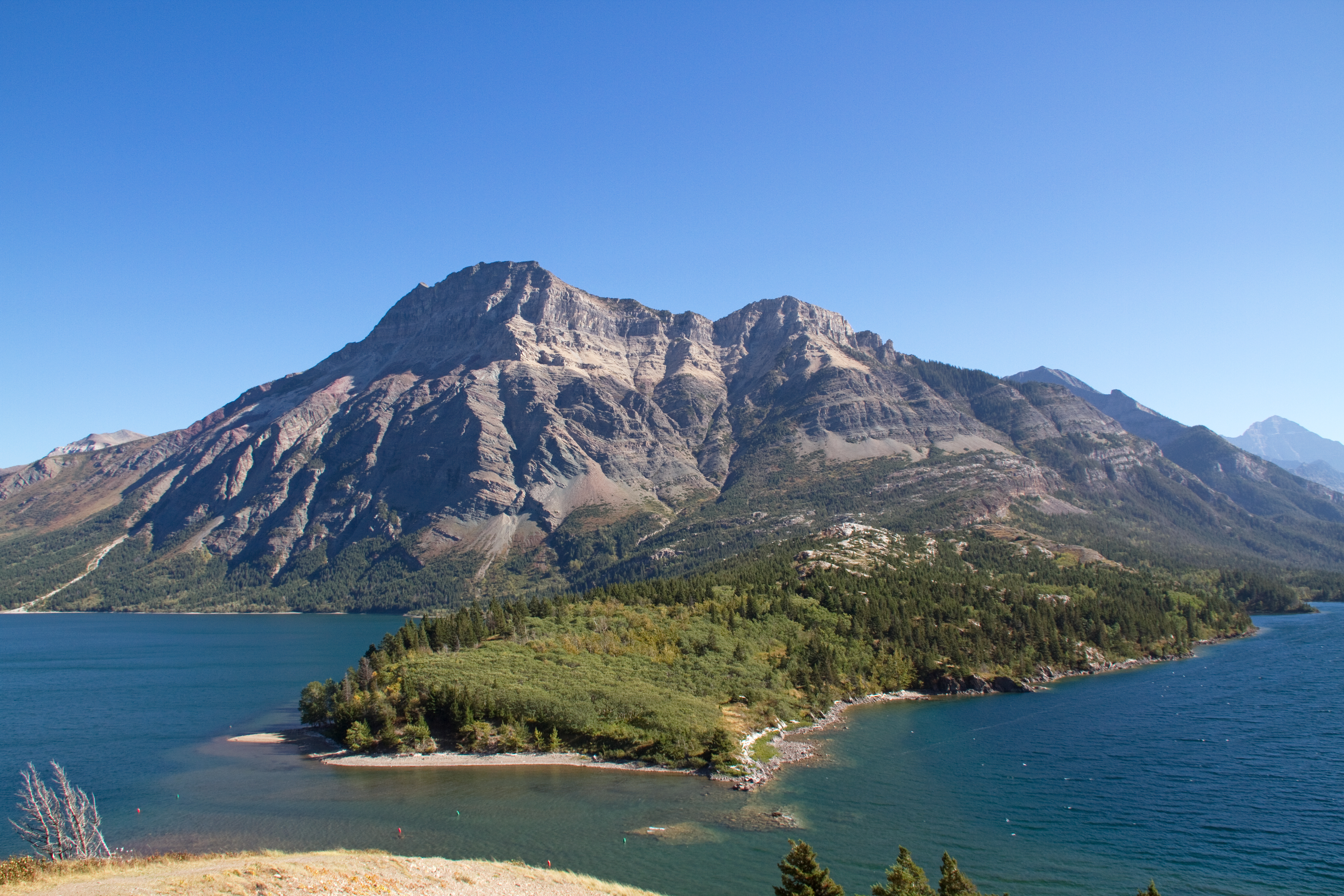
View of Vimy Peak

== See also ==
- Kootenay National Park
- List of National Parks of Canada
- List of mountains of Alberta
- List of protected areas of Alberta
- List of trails in Alberta
- List of waterfalls of Alberta
