= Buswell & Nyberg =

English-Swedish music duo

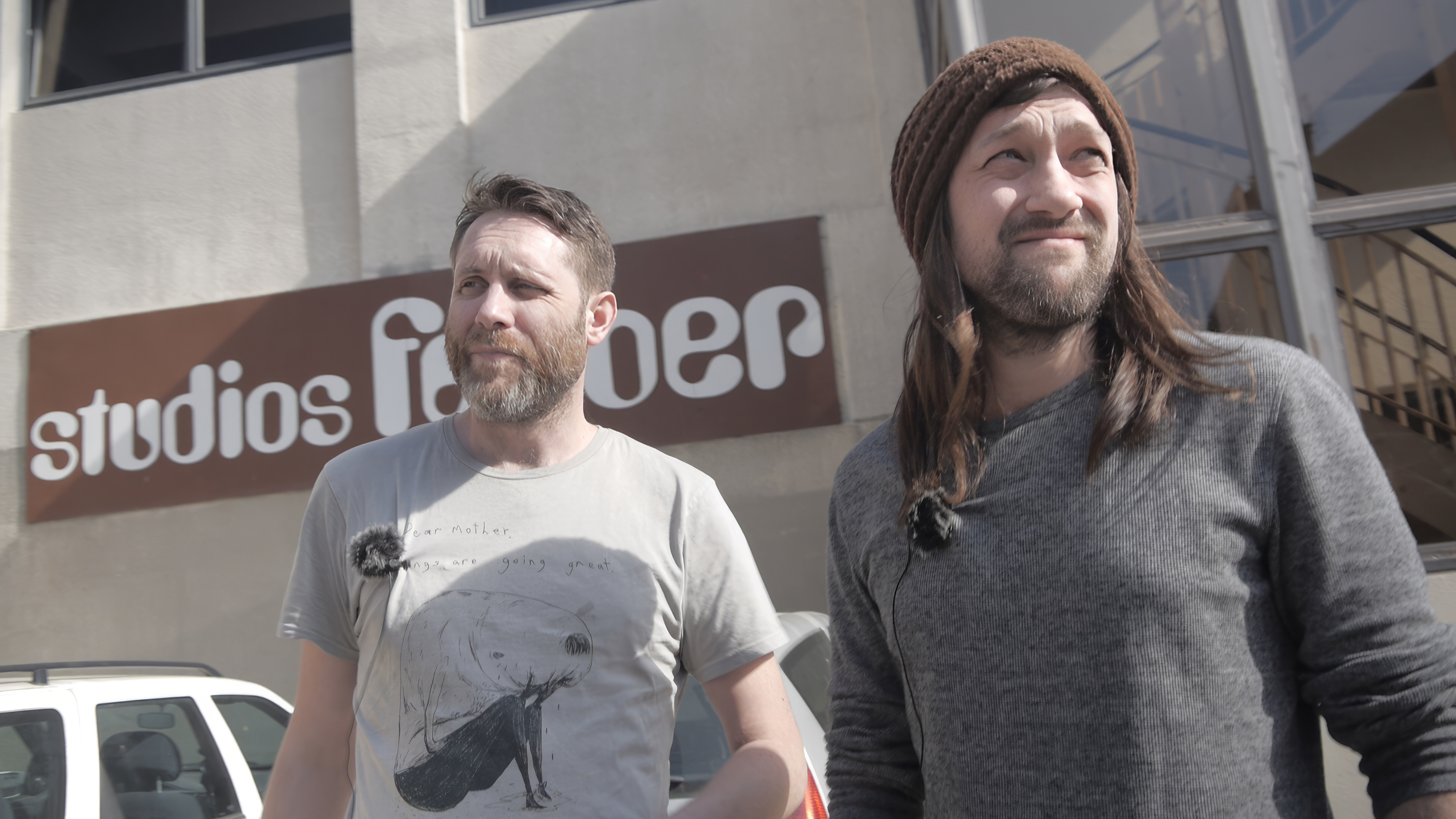
- Buswell & Nyberg outside Studios Ferber, 2017

Shaun Buswell
- Born: Shaun David Buswell; 14 September 1976 (age 49); Swindon, Wiltshire, England
- Occupations: Musician, comedian, musical challenger
- Website: buswellmusic.com

Erik Nyberg
- Born: Erik Gunnar Nyberg; 19 January 1980 (age 46); Skara, Sweden
- Occupations: Musician, record producer, musical challenger
- Website: buswellandnyberg.com

Buswell & Nyberg are a duo consisting of Shaun Buswell, an English musician, comedian and music challenger and Erik Nyberg, a Swedish musician, record producer and music challenger.

Buswell is known for performing with his band Buswell, and Nyberg performs under the name Last Box of Sparklers. They are known for completing musical challenges, and for creating pop-up orchestras from strangers for one-off concerts.

== Early life ==
Buswell was born in Swindon, England. Nyberg was born in Skara, Sweden. They met touring with their respective bands in 2007.

== Music ==
Buswell began his career as a solo artist, Buswell, in 1999. By 2006, this had grown into a five-piece group featuring James Adkin, Matt Musella, Rebecca Bates and Rachel Birkin and the band's debut single "Let Me Love" was featured on MTV's "This is Americana" and VH1, as well as getting to No. 1 and No. 2 in Amazon's Pre-release & Hot 100 CD Singles Chart respectively. Since then, Buswell has performed with multiple musicians and often performs with a line-up in double figures.

== Music challenges ==
Buswell started work on what he would call "musical challenges", often for various charities, where he would attempt seemingly difficult musical tasks, often including him writing and arranging the music without being able to read a single note.

Despite being unable to read music, Buswell uses the music software Sibelius and Cubase to assist him with arranging the music.

Nyberg worked in an advisory capacity on Buswell's early music challenges, finally forming the duo Buswell & Nyberg in 2015, during the 10-Day Orchestra Challenge 2015.

=== Royal Wootton Bassett Orchestra Challenge ===
In 2011, Buswell's first challenge was to compose and write music for the Royal Wootton Bassett Orchestra and perform a one-off show in Swindon in aid of UK based charity Kick 4 Life.

=== 121212 Underground Orchestra Challenge ===
In 2012, Buswell attempted a year-long challenge, where he had to form an orchestra from strangers he met while travelling as passengers on the London Underground, for Daytrippers, a charity supporting disabled and terminally ill children and young people throughout the UK. The challenge was called the 121212 challenge as he had until 12 December 2012 to complete the task.

Halfway through the year, to promote the challenge, and to raise funds for UK charity Music Alive, Buswell formed a small group from musicians he had met so far, and performed on the London Eye.

After 12 months, Buswell had approached over 300 strangers carrying musical instruments and formed a 68-piece orchestra. He then performed a one-off show at O2 Shepherd's Bush Empire, again performing music he scored without being able to read it, as well as a medley of movie themes from films featuring the London Underground.

=== SN1 Fest Challenge ===
In 2013, Buswell reformed 30 musicians from the 121212 Orchestra to take part in the Live and Cultured portion of the SN1 Fest Summer Ball at the Town Gardens, Swindon. The challenge this time was to score original accompaniments for songs by local acts of varying genres, and get the orchestra to perform with them. The orchestra performed with punk band 2 Sick Monkeys, indie-folk band Old Colours, alt-rock band British Harlem and hip-hop act AJ Live. The orchestra also performed a rendition of Arctic Monkeys' "I Bet You Look Good on the Dancefloor" with Radio 1's Huw Stephens.

=== Edinburgh Fringe Orchestra Challenge ===
In 2014, he set himself the task of forming an orchestra from strangers he bumped into at the Edinburgh Fringe Festival in 10 days. As with previous challenges, he composed the music without being able to read it, using composing software Sibelius. After 10 days, he had formed a 24-piece orchestra, who performed a one-off show at The Jam House as part of the Edinburgh Free Fringe.

=== Geronimo Busking Challenge ===
In January 2015, Buswell was asked by Decca Records to create a music video for Sheppard's "Geronimo" from random buskers and musicians he met on the streets of London. He spent five days travelling around and recorded 12 musicians to create a multi-screen video.

=== Pilton Pop-up Orchestra 2015 ===
In 2015, Buswell formed The Pilton Pop-up Orchestra at Glastonbury Festival, made up of people who were attending the festival. They performed on a number of stages during the weekend, including the Glade Stage. Special guests also joined the orchestra to perform a rendition of one of their songs, including Nick Harper, Ellie Rose and The Cadbury Sisters.

=== 10-Day Orchestra Challenge 2015 ===
In November 2015, supported by Arts Council England through a Grants for the Arts Award, Buswell started to work more with Erik Nyberg to create 10 pop-up orchestras in 10 days around the UK, with the aim of playing with 100 different musicians. Buswell was not allowed to personally discuss payment with any musician he met, nor could he hire musicians through advertisements. Instead, he had to find each musician personally and they had to live within a 50-mile radius of the venue. The pair travelled around the UK, eventually forming 10 orchestras that totalled 101 musicians.

=== 10-Day Orchestra Challenge 2016 ===
In June 2016, again supported by Arts Council England through a Grants for the Arts Award, Buswell and Nyberg set out around the UK in an attempt to better their record of 101 musicians from 2015. This time, they set a target of 150 musicians. In 10 days, they managed to form 10 pop-up orchestras from 143 musicians.

=== Paris Orchestra Challenge 2017 ===
In April 2017, Buswell and Nyberg completed their Paris Orchestra Challenge, where from 1–9 April they formed a 27-piece orchestra from strangers they met in Paris, wrote and arranged an album of music with the group, and then recorded 12 songs in 6 hours for a live studio album in Ferber Studios.

=== Siberian Orchestra Challenge 2018 ===
In July 2018, Buswell and Nyberg travelled to Buryatia in Siberia and in one week, formed an orchestra of at least 25 musicians, writing and collaborating on a selection of music that was performed at the "Voice of Nomads" international music festival.

=== Pilton Pop-up Orchestra 2019 ===
In 2019, Buswell created another Pilton Pop-up Orchestra at Glastonbury Festival, made up of performers and people who were attending the festival. 17 musicians performed, including Charlie Draper on Theremin. Special guests also joined the orchestra to perform a rendition of one of their songs, including Frank Turner.

=== Pop-up Lockdown Orchestra 2020 ===
In December 2020, Buswell and Nyberg created a pop-up orchestra of 27 musicians and created a zoom meeting music video. The orchestra was named the Pop-up Lockdown Orchestra, due to the current lockdown positions of COVID-19. They performed a cover of The Pretenders' Christmas hit "2000 Miles".

=== 10 Day Orchestra Challenge 2022 (Europe Edition) ===
In September 2021, Buswell and Nyberg announced they will be attempting a 10-day tour across Europe, created a pop-up orchestra in 10 different cities, with the aim of completing the target of 200 total musicians, 50 more than they failed to achieve in 2016. They have since announced this has been postponed until May 2023. Dates and cities have yet to be announced.

=== Buswell & Nyberg vs Xtra Mile Recordings 2022 ===
In March 2022, Buswell and Nyberg created a pop-up orchestra of over 50 musicians to perform a one-off concert with artists on Xtra Mile Recordings, including Frank Turner, Mull Historical Society, Johnny Lloyd, PET NEEDS, Guise, BERRIES & Deux Furieuses.

=== BANDOC 2024 ===
On 12 May 2024, Buswell and Nyberg will attempt to create a pop-up orchestra of over 20 musicians to perform a one-off concert at Cpunt in Hoofddorp, Netherlands with a variety of special UK and Dutch artists. They have titled this challenge BANDOC (Buswell and Nyberg's Dutch Orchestra Challenge) and have given themselves 3 months to form the orchestra, find the guests, write and arrange the music and perform the concert. Their progress is being tracked via their podcast on Riverside.fm. special guests for the show include PET NEEDS, Loupe, Non Canon, George & The Rams, Limandi, Lydia Lyon, MØDi, Chris Richter and Pampel.

== GPS penis art ==
Whilst touring the UK as part of 2016's 10-Day Orchestra Challenge, Buswell noticed it would be possible to reroute the travels to draw a giant penis across England and Scotland in GPS drawing. Using GPS tracking that users could log into and watch, the drawing was created in real time, and Buswell and Nyberg drew a 400+ mile penis during their tour.

== Discography ==
- Buswell - Buy Me New Shoes (2006)
- Buswell - Stitched Shoes & An Irish Wristwatch (2018)
