= Boswell =

Boswell may refer to:

== Places ==
=== Canada ===
- Boswell, British Columbia, a rural community
- Boswell, British Columbia (Central Coast), a former cannery town
- Mount Boswell, Alberta

=== England ===
- Boswell, a hamlet in Elkington, Lincolnshire

=== United States ===
- Boswell, Indiana, a town in Benton County
- Boswell, Missouri, an extinct railroad terminal in Minton Township, Holt County, Missouri
- Boswell, Oklahoma, a town in Choctaw County
- Boswell, Pennsylvania, a borough in Somerset County

==== See also ====
- Boswell's Corner, Virginia, a census-designated place in Stafford County

== People ==
=== Surname ===
- Boswell (surname)

=== Given name ===
- Boswell or Boisil (died 661), Christian saint and abbot
- Boswell Williams (1926–2014), Saint Lucian politician

=== Other uses ===
- Boswell family, a large extended family of Travellers in England
- The Boswell Sisters, an American singing trio of the jazz and swing eras
- Clan Boswell, a Lowland Scottish clan

== Education ==
- The Boswells School, a secondary school in Chelmsford, Essex, England
- Boswell High School, Fort Worth, Texas, United States
- Boswell School, Izard County, Arkansas, United States, a school building on the National Register of Historic Places

== Other uses ==
- Boswell (horse), a Thoroughbred racehorse
- Boswell: A Modern Comedy, a novel by Stanley Elkin
- Boswell baronets, an extinct title in the Baronetage of the United Kingdom
- Boswell Observatory, at Doane College in Nebraska, U.S.
- Boswell's Tavern, an 18th-century tavern near Gordonsville, Virginia, United States, on the National Register of Historic Places
- Boswells of Oxford, or simply Boswells, a department store in Oxford, England

== See also ==
- Boswellia, a genus of trees
- Boswil, a municipality in Switzerland
- St Boswells, a village in Scotland
