= Boswell (surname) =

Boswell is a British family name of Norman origins and may refer to the following individuals:

- Alexander Boswell, Lord Auchinleck (1706–1782), judge of the Scottish supreme court and father of James Boswell
- Alexander Boswell (songwriter) (1775–1822), Scottish songwriter, son of James Boswell, grandson of Alexander Boswell
- Sir Alexander Boswell (1928–2021), British lieutenant general.
- Anthony Boswell (born 2006), American football player
- Bobby Boswell (born 1983), American soccer player
- Charles Boswell (1886–1956), New Zealand politician
- Chris Boswell (born 1991), American football kicker
- Christina Boswell (born 1972), Professor of politics
- Claud Irvine Boswell (1742–1824), Scottish judge
- Dave Boswell (baseball player) (1945–2012), American baseball player
- Edward Boswell (1760–1842), English antiquarian and solicitor
- Eric Boswell (songwriter) (1921–2009), English songwriter
- Eric J. Boswell (born 1945), United States Assistant Secretary of State for Diplomatic Security
- Eve Boswell (1922–1998), Hungarian-born singer in South Africa and Britain
- Granny Boswell (c. 1817–1909), Cornish Gypsy
- Ian Boswell (born 1991), American road cyclist
- James Boswell (1740–1795), Scottish lawyer, diarist, author, and biographer of Samuel Johnson
- James Griffin Boswell (1882–1952), American businessman
- Jeremiah Boswell (born 1982), American basketball coach
- John Boswell of Balmuto (1546–1610), Scottish landowner
- John Boswell (1947–1994), American historian and Yale professor
- Ken Boswell (born 1946), American baseball player
- Ken Boswell (rower) (1912–1984), New Zealand rower
- Kylan Boswell (born 2005), American basketball player
- Leonard Boswell (1934–2018), American politician
- Lewis Archer Boswell (1834–1909), aviation pioneer
- Mark Boswell (athlete) (born 1977), Canadian athlete
- Merideth Boswell, American set decorator and production designer
- Paul P. Boswell (1905–1982), American physician and politician
- Ron Boswell (1940–2026), Australian politician
- Scott Boswell (born 1974), English cricketer
- Stewart Boswell (born 1978), Australian squash player
- Thomas Boswell (born 1947), Washington Post sports columnist
- Tim Boswell (1942–2025), British politician
- Tom Boswell (disambiguation), multiple people
- William Boswell (disambiguation), multiple people

== See also ==
- Boswell family
- Boswell (disambiguation)
- Buswell (surname)
