= Alexander Boswell =

Alexander Boswell may refer to:

- Alexander Boswell, Lord Auchinleck (1706–1782), 8th Laird of Auchinleck, Scottish judge
- Sir Alexander Boswell, 1st Baronet, 10th Laird of Auchinleck (1775–1822), writer of traditional Scottish songs
- Alexander Boswell (British Army officer) (1928–2021), British Army officer

== See also ==
- Boswell (surname)
