= Mount Boswell =

Mountain in the country of Canada

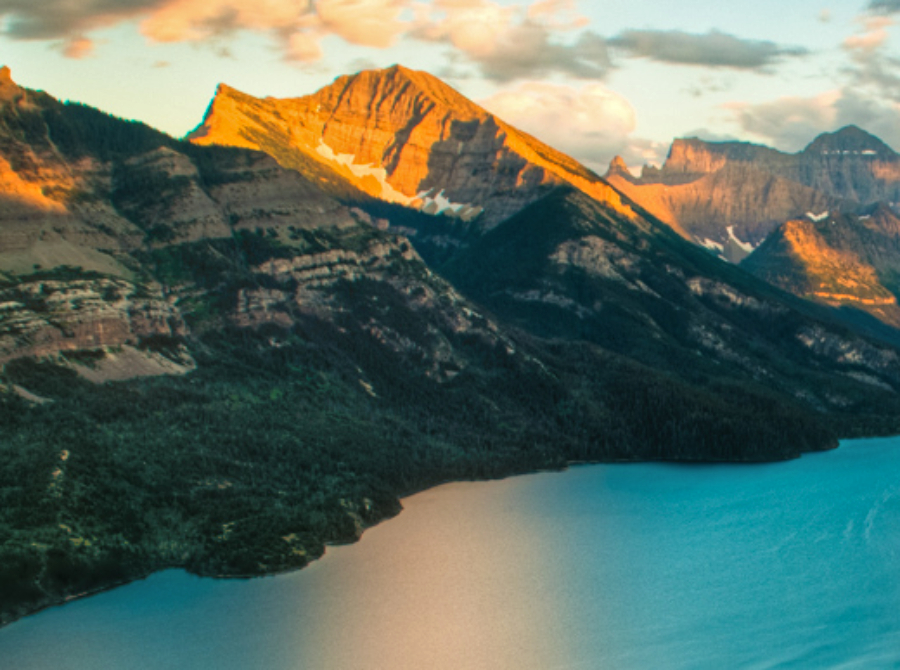
- Mount Boswell above Waterton Lake

Highest point
- Elevation: 2,454 m (8,051 ft)
- Prominence: 194 m (636 ft)
- Parent peak: Miche Wabun Peak (2701 m)
- Listing: Mountains of Alberta
- Coordinates: 49°00′25″N 113°51′59″W

Geography
- Location within Alberta Location within Canada
- Interactive map of Mount Boswell
- Location: Alberta, Canada
- Parent range: Canadian Rockies
- Topo map: NTS 82H4 Waterton Lakes

Geology
- Rock age: Cambrian

Climbing
- Easiest route: scrambling

Mount Boswell is a 2,454-metre (8,051-foot) summit located in Waterton Lakes National Park, in the Canadian Rockies of Alberta, Canada. It is situated along the east shore of Waterton Lake, one kilometre north of the Canada–United States border. Its nearest higher peak is Miche Wabun Peak, 5.0 km (3.1 mi) to the southeast.

== History ==
Mount Boswell was named in 1917 for Dr. W.G. Boswell, the veterinarian for the International Boundary Commission.

The mountain's name was officially adopted in 1943 by the Geographical Names Board of Canada.

== Geology ==
Like other mountains in Waterton Lakes National Park, Mount Boswell is composed of sedimentary rock laid down during the Precambrian to Jurassic periods. Formed in shallow seas, this sedimentary rock was pushed east and over the top of younger Cretaceous period rock during the Laramide orogeny.

== Climate ==
Based on the Köppen climate classification, Mount Boswell is located in a subarctic climate with cold, snowy winters, and mild summers. Temperatures can drop below −20 C with wind chill factors below −30 C. Precipitation runoff from Mount Boswell drains into Waterton Lake, thence Waterton River.

== Gallery ==
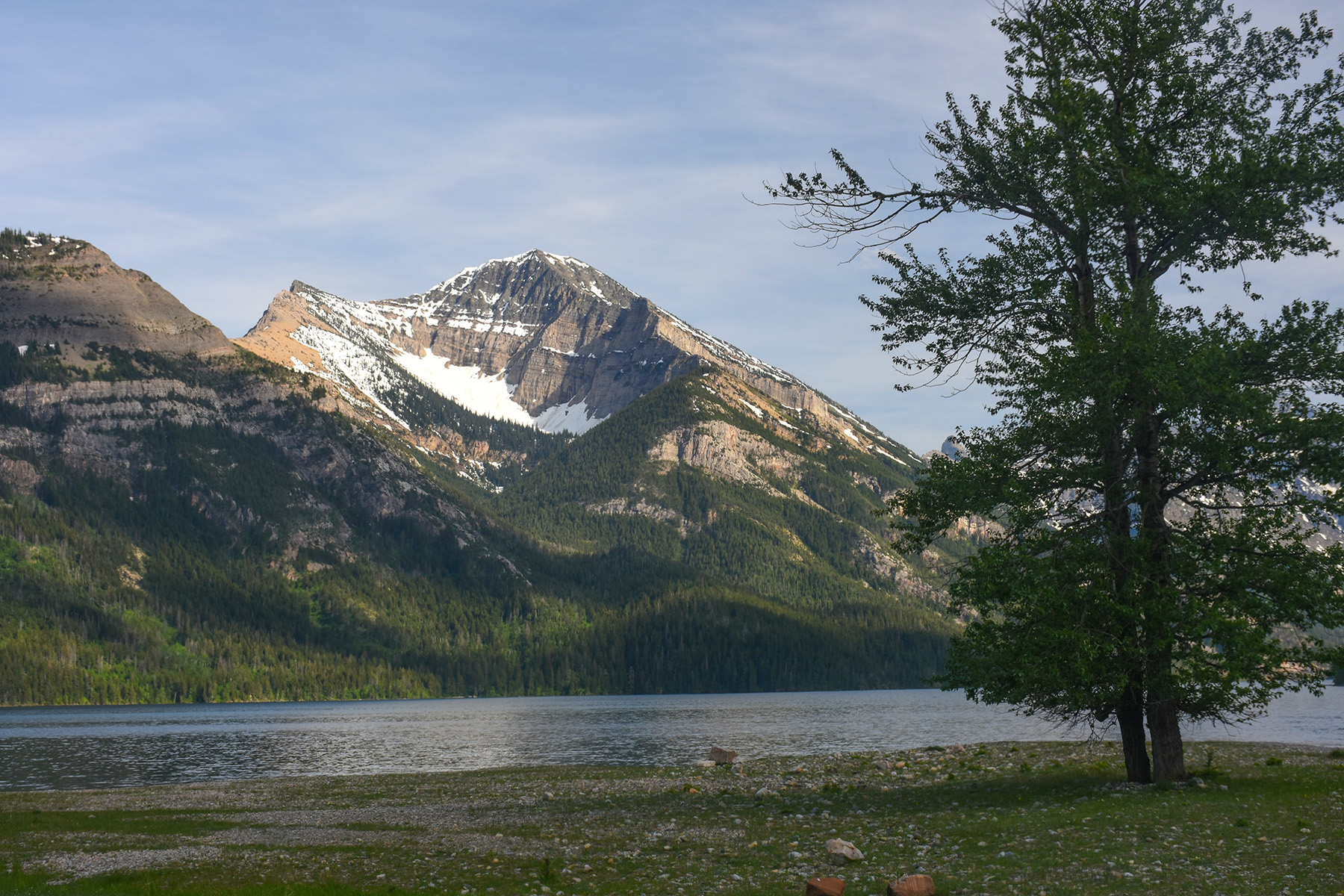
Mount Boswell

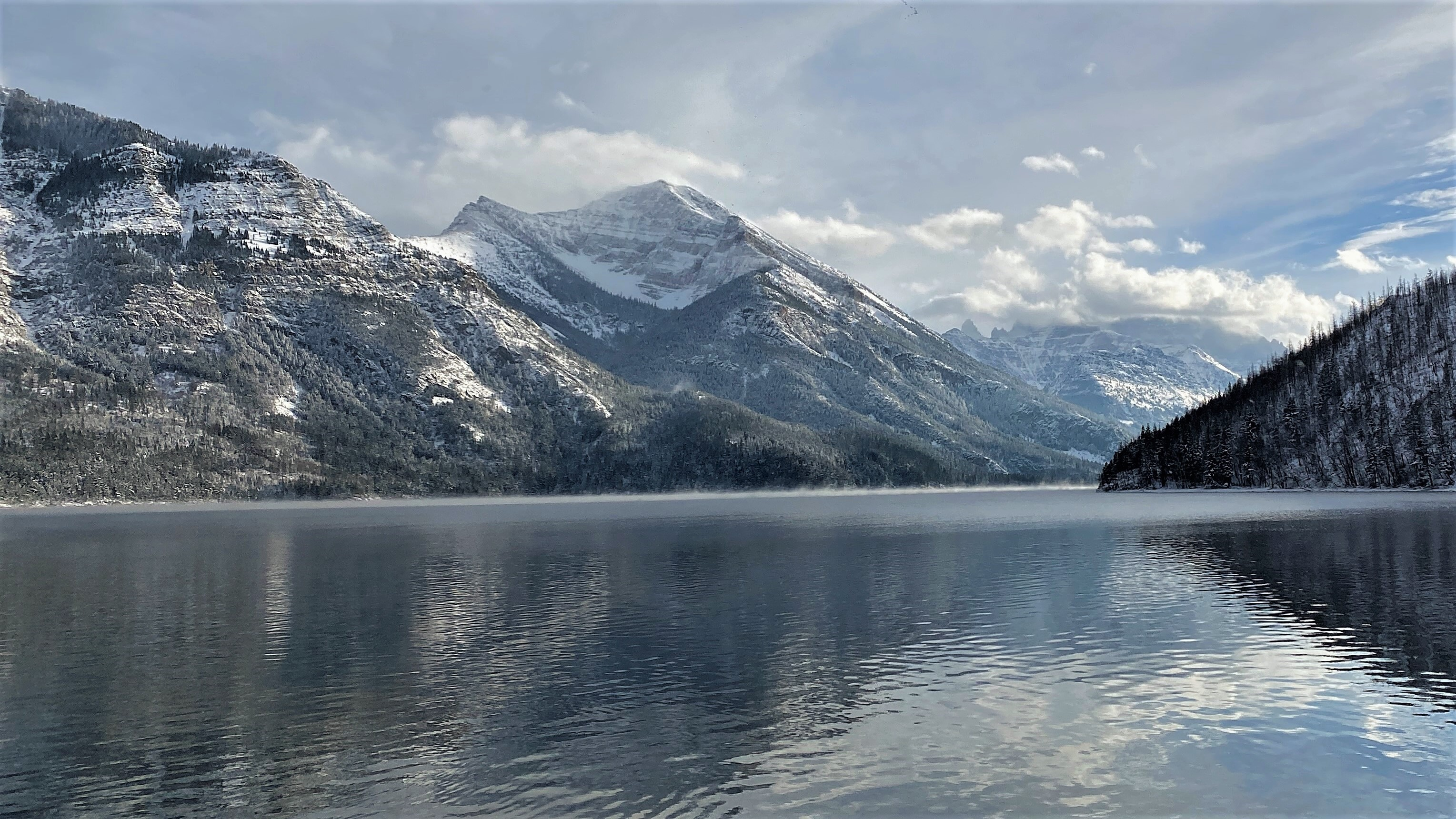
Winter scene

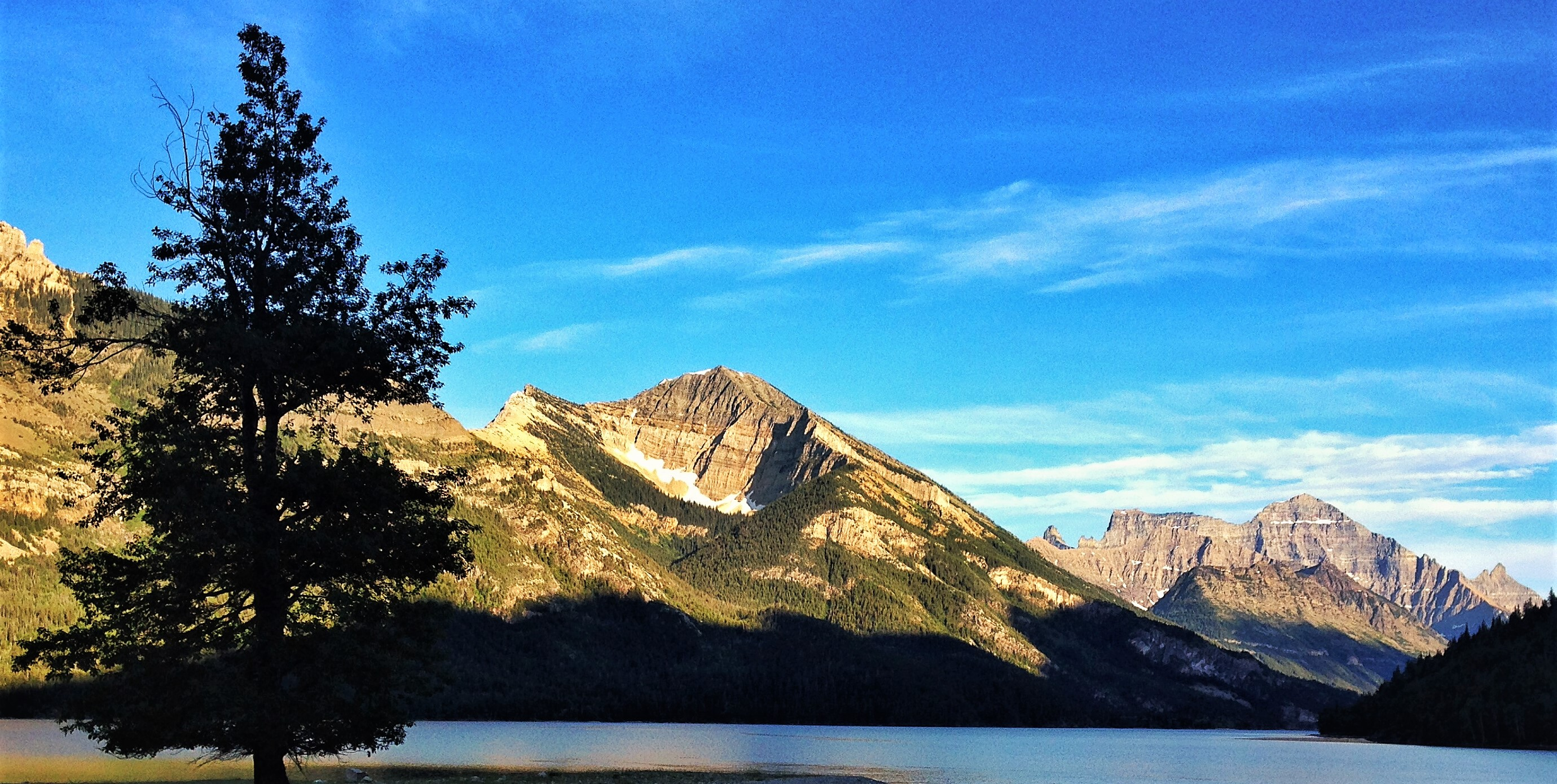
Mount Boswell centered, (Mt. Cleveland to right)

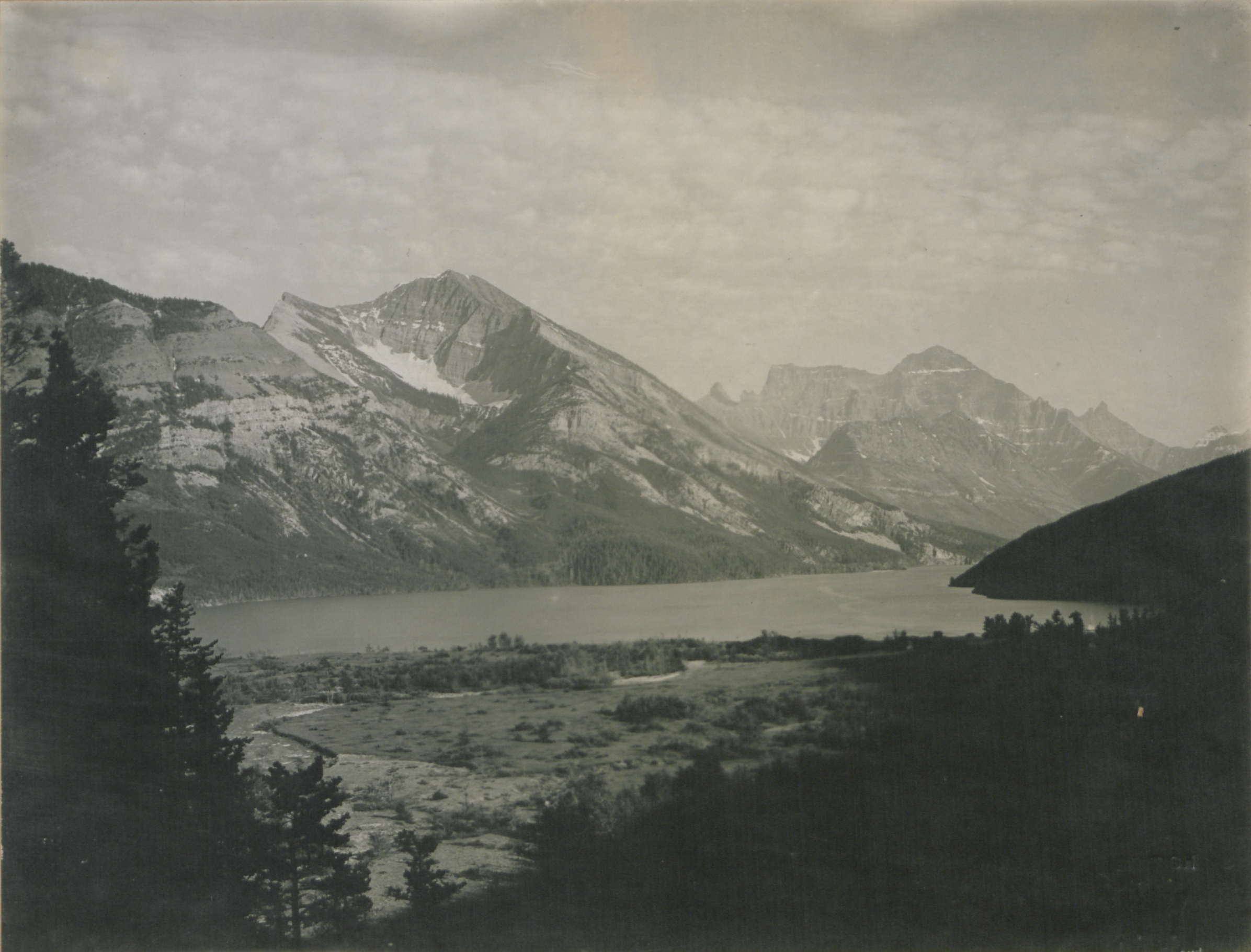
circa 1919
