= Buswell =

See also Boswell (surname)

Buswell is a surname. Notable people with the surname include:

- Blair Buswell (born 1956), American artist
- Charles Albert Buswell (1913–2008), American bishop
- Dianne Buswell (born 1989), Australian dancer
- Henry Buswell (1839–1940), English Anglican priest
- J. Oliver Buswell (1895–1977), American churchman, educator, president of Wheaton College (Illinois)
- Neville Buswell (1943–2019), British actor
- Shaun Buswell (born 1976), British musician
- Troy Buswell (born 1966), Australian politician
- Walter Buswell (1907–1991), Canadian ice hockey player
- Walter Buswell (cricketer) (1875–1950), English cricketer
