= Connect the dots =

Puzzle

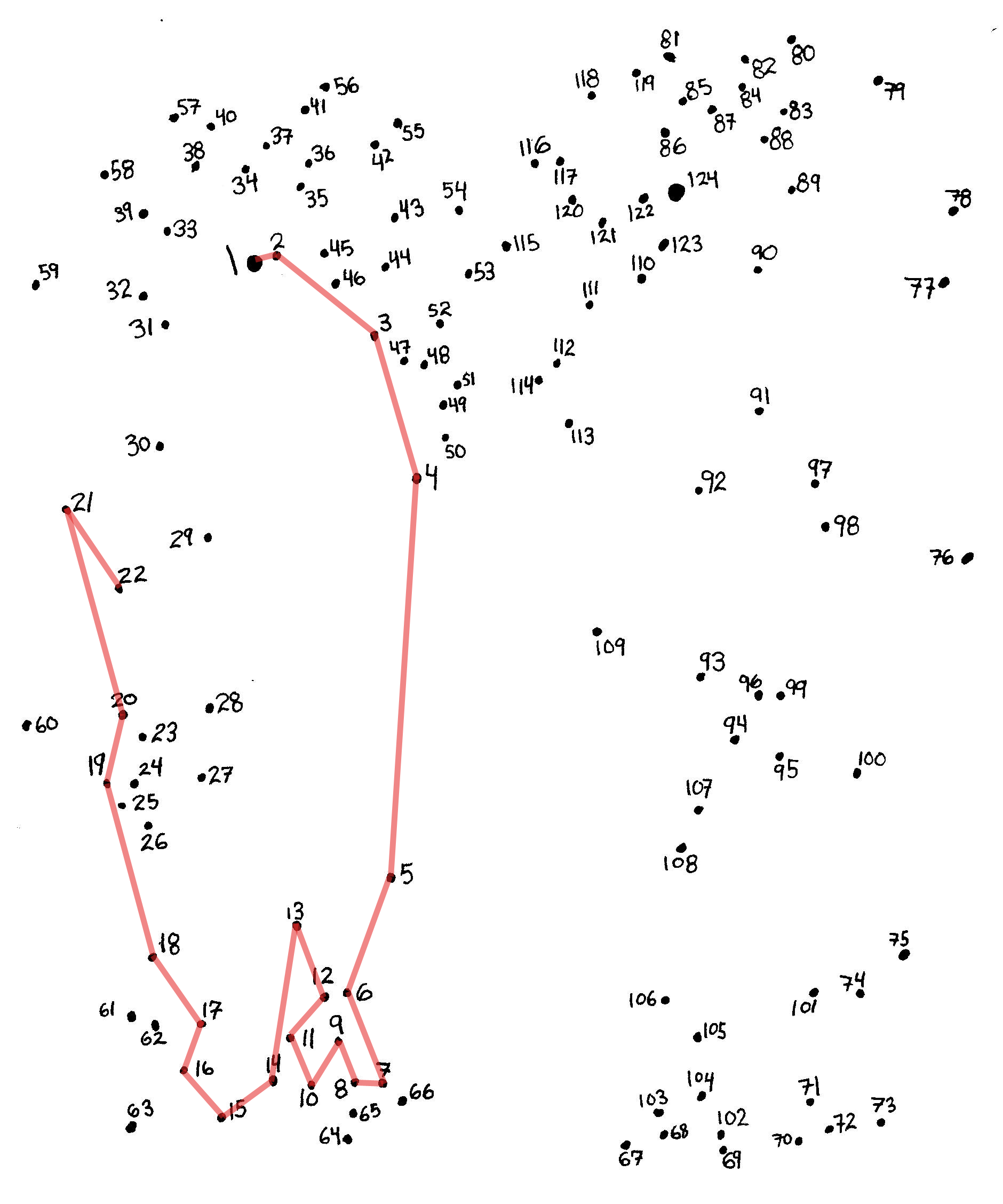
A partially solved puzzle

Connect the dots (also known as connect-the-dots, dot to dot, join the dots or follow the dots) is a form of puzzle containing a sequence of numbered dots. When a line is drawn connecting the dots the outline of an object is revealed. The puzzles frequently contain simple line art to enhance the image created or to assist in rendering a complex section of the image. Connect the dots puzzles are generally created for children. The use of numbers can be replaced with letters or other symbols. Versions for older solvers frequently have extra solving steps to discover the order, such as those used in puzzlehunts and the connect-the-dots crosswords invented by Liz Gorski.

The roots of connecting dots to create pictures or help with calligraphy can be traced back to the 19th century. The Nine Dots Puzzle is the first known puzzle game where the player has to connect dots. But in this variant the goal is not to draw a picture, but to solve a logic puzzle. The emergence of connect the dots games in the printed press takes place in the early 20th century. These games were published with other puzzle games as pastime for children on the Sunday edition. While the first books containing connect the dots games exclusively were printed in 1926 by Ward, Lock & Co.

A mostly complete puzzle

The phrase "connect the dots" can be used as a metaphor to illustrate an ability (or inability) to associate one idea with another—to find the "big picture", or salient feature, in a mass of data; it can mean using extrapolation to solve a mystery from clues, or else come to a conclusion from various facts.

The Connect the Dots drawing technique of GPS Drawing involves recording an artists GPS data only at certain points along the route. This can give the image the appearance of a dot to dot puzzle as most of the lines are straight no matter the geography of the area.

Reuven Feuerstein features the connection of dots as the first tool in his cognitive development program.

The travelling salesman problem asks what numbers to assign to a set of points to minimize the length of the drawing.

== See also ==
- Constellation
- Trail Making Test
- Dotto
- Paint by numbers
