= Clan Boswell =

Lowland Scottish clan

- Crest: A falcon Proper, hooded Gules, jessed and belled Or
- Motto: Vraye foi (True faith)
- Clan Boswell no longer has a chief, and is an armigerous clan

Clan Boswell is a Lowland Scottish clan and is recognized as such by the Lord Lyon King of Arms. However the clan does not currently have a chief and is therefore considered an Armigerous clan.

== History ==
=== Origins ===
The chiefs of the Clan Boswell are universally accepted to have been of Norman or French origin. The historian, Black, gives two variations of the name, from either a vill or manor near Yvetot in Normandy or from Beuzevill near Bolbec. The Lord de Bosville is said to have been one of the Norman commanders in 1066 at the Battle of Hastings. Robert de Boseuille witnessed several charters in the reign of William the Lion and is believed to have been among the knights who accompanied David I of Scotland back to Scotland after he had stayed at the English court.

=== Wars of Scottish Independence ===
During the Wars of Scottish Independence chief Walter de Bosville was taken prisoner by the English at the Battle of Dunbar (1296). In the same year William de Bosville rendered homage to England. His son was Richard de Bosville and received lands near Ardrossan from Robert the Bruce.

=== 16th Century & Anglo-Scottish Wars ===
During the Anglo-Scottish Wars of the 16th century chief Sir Alexander Boswell of Balmuto was killed at the battle of Flodden in 1513. His son David Boswell was killed at the battle of Pinkie in 1547. John Boswell of Balmuto was knighted at Stirling Castle on 30 August 1594, at the baptism of Prince Henry.

=== 17th Century & Civil War ===
Many Boswells fell fighting for the royalist cause at the Battle of Worcester during the civil war in 1651.

=== 18th Century ===
Alexander Boswell (judge), the 8th Laird of Auchinleck, was elevated to the Bench in 1756 and assumed the title ‘Lord Auchinleck’. His son, James Boswell, 9th Laird of Auchinleck, was the famous biographer of Dr Samuel Johnson. Sir Alexander Boswell, 1st Baronet, 10th Laird of Auchinleck, the biographer’s son, was created a baronet in 1821. Another distinguished Boswell was Robert Boswell, Writer to the Signet, who held the post of Interim Lord Lyon, King of Arms, from 1795 to 1796.

== Clan Profile ==
- Arms: Argent, on a fess Sable three cinquefoils of the First
- Crest: A falcon Proper, hooded Gules, jessed and belled Or
- Motto: Vraye foi (True faith)

== See also ==
- Scottish clan
- Armigerous clan
- Boswell (surname)
