= Granny Boswell =

Irish-born Cornish witch

- Born: Ann Boswell; 1813; County Tipperary, Ireland
- Died: 16 April 1909 (aged 95–96); Helston, Cornwall, United Kingdom

Ann "Granny" Boswell (1813 – 16 April 1909) was a wise woman and healer, who had a reputation as a witch in Helston, Cornwall, UK.

== Life ==
Ann Boswell was born in Ireland in 1813 of Romany lineage. She married Ephraim Boswell, known as the 'King of the Gypsies'. From 1860, the couple lived in west Cornwall, mostly on the Lizard around Helston. The couple had 6 children the first of whom, Love Unity Boswell, was born in 1861. Her husband worked as a variously a labourer, cane worker, and cabinet maker.

Boswell was known in the area for her work as a wise woman and healer, and would sell healing charms. She was known for her ability to heal sick cattle. Around 1900, A. H. Hawke took a portrait photograph of Boswell sitting smoking a pipe. Boswell was sent to Helston Workhouse for being drunk in public, and died there on 16 April 1909. Her funeral was attended by a large crowd including members of the Romany community, and she is buried at the Tregerest Methodist Chapel.
