= Reid Stowe =

American artist and mariner

William Reid Stowe
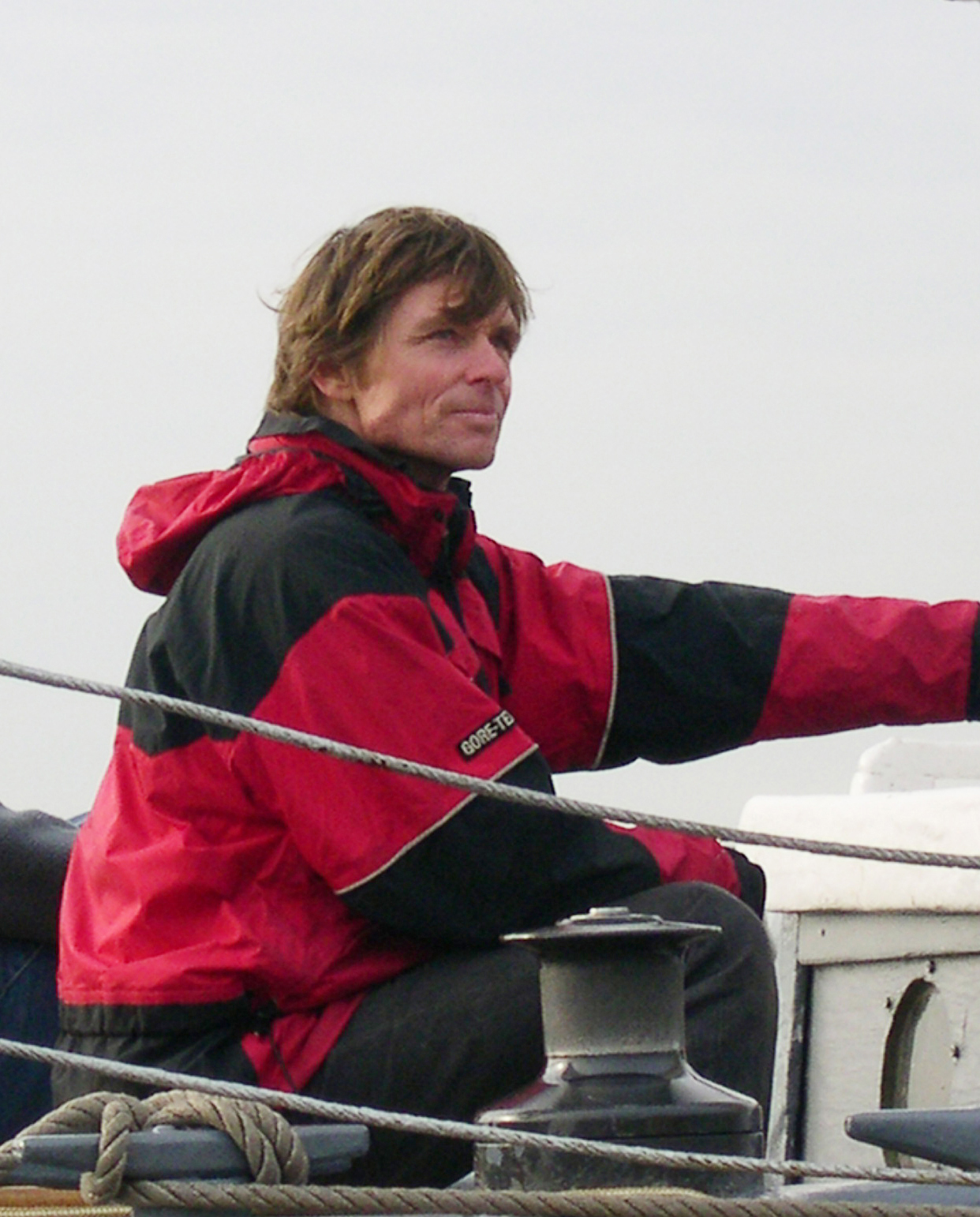
- Stowe in 2005
- Born: January 6, 1952 (age 74)
- Occupations: Artist and Craftsman, Sailor, Adventurer
- Known for: Extended voyages with schooner Anne

William Reid Stowe (born January 6, 1952) is an American visual artist and mariner. Stowe grew up around sailboats on the East Coast, sailing on the Pacific and Atlantic Oceans in his late teens and early twenties. By age 26, he had built two of his own sailboats with the help of his family and friends. Stowe subsequently sailed to the Antarctic with his schooner Anne in 1986 and completed a 194-day journey without touching land in 1999.

In 2010 Stowe completed a more extensive ocean voyage, entitled 1000 Days at Sea: The Mars Ocean Odyssey—a journey that commenced on April 21, 2007, from the 12th St. Pier, Hoboken, New Jersey. Stowe was the principal designer and builder of the Anne, a 70 ft (21.3 m), 60-ton (54,400 kg) gaff-rigged schooner which he sailed on this voyage. The purpose of the enterprise was to remain on the open ocean, without resupply or pulling into any harbor, for a period of one thousand days, along with some other goals that were not met, such as circumnavigating the globe four times. The single circumnavigation involved active management of a sailboat under varying weather conditions, with continuous wear and tear of equipment on the schooner, although the schooner was not always under full sail.

On June 17, 2010, Stowe sailed the schooner Anne up the Hudson River, accompanied by Sail Magazine's Executive Editor Charles Doane, and docked in New York. The total voyage duration claimed by Stowe was 1,152 days, a potential record for the longest continuous sea voyage without resupply or stepping on land. Upon landing at Pier 81 in Manhattan, he was met by family and friends, by his then girlfriend Soanya Ahmad—who had accompanied him for the first quarter of the journey—and their toddler son, as well as by the press.

== Childhood ==
Reid Stowe was born January 6, 1952, near Moses Lake, Washington to Harry and Anne Stowe; and is the oldest of six siblings. His father, an officer in the United States Air Force, was posted to many parts of the world during that time and usually his family travelled with him. Growing up, Reid spent three years in Germany, two years in the Philippines, plus state-side tours in Mississippi, Illinois, Arizona, and Virginia. Traveling notwithstanding, the family generally spent summers with Anne Stowe's father, who had constructed a beach cottage on the Intracoastal Waterway near Ocean Isle Beach, North Carolina. Anne's father and uncles frequently built and rebuilt portions of the home, and built small craft for use on the waterway. It was during these summer interludes that Reid absorbed carpentry, and, during his high school years with his younger brother Wave, Stowe built fiberglass surf boards. He and his brother employed workshops that his family maintained in various winter residences to complete their work after school.

== Early voyages ==
Reid Stowe initially pursued studies in the arts, enrolling in the University of Arizona, where he took up painting and sculpture. During his late teens, Stowe visited Hawaii in the summer to surf. During one of these Hawaiian excursions, when Stowe was nineteen, he fell in with Craige Fostvedt, (Note: The first name is spelled "Craig" on Fostvedt's own website, and is the most common spelling of this name. For some unknown reason, Reid Stowe adds an 'e' at the end of the name. "Craige" is typically employed as a surname, and is also the name of a student residence at UNC Chapel Hill.) who had invested some of his college funds to purchase a small sailing vessel. Invited to accompany him on an extended sail through the South Pacific to New Zealand, Stowe was obliged to obtain a passport, for which he needed a copy of his birth certificate. Years later, Stowe recalled to interviewer Harold Channer that his parents could very well have refused to send him the certificate and instead could have insisted on his return to school. That they chose otherwise, Stowe regards as a life-affirming experience, the tacit parental support giving him confidence to proceed. The South Pacific trip was Stowe's first experience with open ocean sailing, for which he acquired a passion.

Following his South Pacific voyage, Stowe returned to his grandfather's residence in Ocean Isle Beach, North Carolina, where he spent eight months constructing a 27 ft (8.23 m) and 1,400 lb (635 kg) catamaran named Tantra, specifically for open ocean sailing. During its construction, he was visited by a Dutchman—whom he had first met on his South Pacific voyage—who persuaded Stowe to take the catamaran across the North Atlantic to the Netherlands. The two embarked on their journey to the Netherlands in June, 1973. After their arrival, Reid Stowe continued on a solo voyage which took him to Africa, a second Atlantic crossing, a trip to Brazil and the Amazon, returning to the United States in 1976. In his 2003 interview with Harold Channer, Stowe claimed that the catamaran Tantra was "the smallest boat to cross the Atlantic Ocean twice," though on closer reading it appears that a smaller boat has made the round-trip crossing as early as the nineteenth century. In 1880–1881, George P. Thomas and Frederick Norman navigated their 16 ft 7 in (5.05 m) dory Little Western from Gloucester, Massachusetts, to Cowes, England, in June 1880, stayed in England for nearly one year, and returned to America the following June.

=== Construction of the Anne (originally named Tantra Schooner) ===
Following his return to the United States, Stowe's thoughts turned to the construction of a vessel well suited to extended voyages. He was particularly impressed with gaff-rigged schooners, which he felt represented a culmination of craft and technique for sailing vessels. In 1976, he took up residence in the North Carolina beach cottage of his maternal grandfather, and with extensive help from his mother's family, his father—now a retired Colonel—and his siblings, Reid Stowe began the construction of a sailing vessel designed after late nineteenth-century American gaff-rigged fishing schooners, prevalent from the 1880s to the 1900s. The completed design called for a 60-ton (54,400 kg), two-masted gaff-rigged vessel, 70 ft (21.3 m) in length with a 16 ft (4.88 m) beam. Unlike the nineteenth century antecedent, however, Stowe and his family employed Ferralite over steel wire mesh for the hull, with interior spaces finished in Caribbean hardwood supplied largely from debris thrown up by Hurricane David. In an interview with Harold Channer, Stowe likened the hull to a sealed steel and fiberglass bottle. Additionally, electricity for computers and communication equipment is generated from wind, solar, and water motion generators. Stowe, his family, and friends of the family, were engaged in building the craft over the next eighteen months, completing the work in 1978. The shipyard was entirely confined to the beach cottage property of his grandfather. Named Tantra Schooner at launch, Stowe established the ship as his home, sailing it originally to the Caribbean with his then wife, Iris and baby daughter Viva, "[finishing] the interior en route and in the islands." Author Jill Bobrow, in her 1982 Classic Yacht Interiors attributed some of the interior handiwork to Iris: "a beautiful walnut inlaid with enamel."

== Voyages with the Anne ==
=== The Caribbean and Antarctica ===
According to Bobrow, Stowe initially sailed the Tantra Schooner as a charter boat, but indirectly noted the possibility of extended voyaging even in the early eighties: "The charter accommodations are fabricated so that when extra quarters are not necessary, that space is set up to be a cargo hold — the intent being to make Tantra Schooner totally self-supporting." In this early description of the vessel and her crew, Bobrow reported: "Reid and Iris are a delightful, spiritual couple. Their boat reflects their ingenuity, creativity, and joy of life."

Renamed the Anne in honor of his mother and her family, Stowe took the schooner to Antarctic waters in 1986 with a crew of eight, his first long-term trial with the vessel. For five months, Stowe and his crew sailed the waters around the Antarctic Peninsula and the South Shetland Islands. Stowe navigated into ice packs and claimed winds of up to 110 miles per hour (180 km/h). Later, Stowe told Nik Kleinberg of ESPN: "You're geared up like an ice man, goggles, everything, not a bit of skin exposed. We had a gust of wind that blew the boat completely over." To combat boredom, the crew "fought the lack of sensory stimulation with plastic filters that allowed people to bathe in different colored lights, and a 'bag of tricks' that included scented herbs and spices, stones, religious artifacts, pebbles, sand, and other items that stimulated the senses and kindled fond memories of home."

It was during this voyage that Stowe began seriously considering a trip of extremely long duration. Author Albert A. Harrison characterized these circa 1990 plans in his 2001 book, Spacefaring: The Human Dimension. "The Anne, [seventy feet] long (Note: Albert A. Harrison quoted the length at "twelve meters", when in fact the boat is seventy feet, or 21.336 meters in length.) and displacing sixty tons, would set forth with a crew of six to eight (the same size as an initial Mars crew under some scenarios) and three years worth of provisions. For a thousand days they would sail outside of normal trade routes and without entering port. The crew would consist of scientists who would study weather, water, and atmospheric pollution, and ozone depletion in remote and little-documented regions of the world. Stowe hoped to conduct field tests of communication satellites, water purification systems and other equipment potentially useful for exploring Mars." Later, Stowe, with Harrison, authored the paper, "One thousand days non-stop at sea – Lessons for a mission to Mars" outlining a "1000-day voyage without touching land or receiving supplies from other craft. The goals of this expedition include the evaluation of equipment, supplies, and humans under conditions of isolation and confinement that will resemble some of those of the initial Mars voyage."

=== The Port of New York ===
In the fall of 1997, Stowe began using Pier 63 as a base of operations, located in the Chelsea section of Manhattan, New York City at a marina operated by John Krevey. He promoted his one thousand days voyage in earnest, calling it the "1000 Days at Sea: The Mars Ocean Odyssey," and one news article at the time suggested a launch date of 1999. It would be eight years, and one marriage later, before Stowe found sufficient funding and media support for the project. In the intervening time, Stowe made his home on board the Anne, used Pier 63 as his address, and undertook preliminary trips with Laurence Guillem, whom he had married in 1999. By 2001, the couple was stocking up on provisions for the planned 1000-day voyage.

In 2006, the construction of a new park along the Hudson River forced the owner of the maritime barge at Pier 63—where Reid had kept his schooner Anne—to relocate to Pier 66. This caused the move of the schooner Anne to the 12th St. Pier across the river in Hoboken, on the New Jersey side, from which Reid eventually embarked on his epic voyage.

==== Voyage of the Turtle: Prelude to '1000 Days at Sea' ====
Stowe's prelude to the present voyage was undertaken in 1999, when he and his new bride, Laurence Guillem, voyaged the South Atlantic Ocean for 194 days on the Anne, an expedition which Guillem dubbed "The Odyssey of the Sea Turtle." Stowe's intent during this preliminary voyage was to shape a course literally in the shape of a turtle, as a form of GPS art. Of this choice, Stowe said: "There's also something to be said about not racing around all the time. So this voyage was sort of an antidote to our speed-obsessed society. And the turtle is also a reminder about endangered species and the environment. I'm sure it's going to be interpreted in different ways." The voyage lasted from June 4, to December 17, 1999, with no major mishap, though it had its tribulations. The Anne suffered engine failure under the Verrazano-Narrows Bridge, aging sailcloth limited the precision of Stowe's navigation — the turtle was neither as large nor as complete as he had originally hoped — and a brush with Hurricane Lenny on their return leg hampered their return to the port of New York. Still, he and his sailing mate had spent over a half year out of sight of land.

==== Subsequent attempts ====
Stowe and Guillem undertook a second exercise in January 2001, a voyage to Trinidad in which the Anne encountered severe weather off Bermuda. The ship knocked over on its side once (although local papers incorrectly reported three knockdowns) in high seas, but righted itself. Having injured her jaw in the mishap, it was the last significant voyage that Guillem undertook with Stowe. Of her reluctance to return to sea, she said of him: "J'aime Reid, mais lui c'est un poisson et moi non." ("I love Reid, but he is a fish and I am not.")

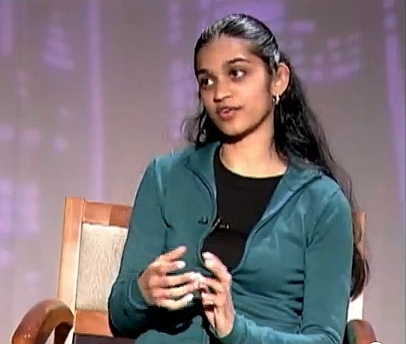
Soanya Ahmad in January 2010

=== The 1000-day voyage ===
Stowe and Ahmad departed on the 1000-day voyage on April 21, 2007, at 3:00 PM EDT from the 12th St. Pier in Hoboken, New Jersey, witnessed by about 100 well-wishers, including his parents and his former wife, Laurence Guillem. The heavily laden schooner passed through New York Harbor and into the open ocean by the evening of April 21.

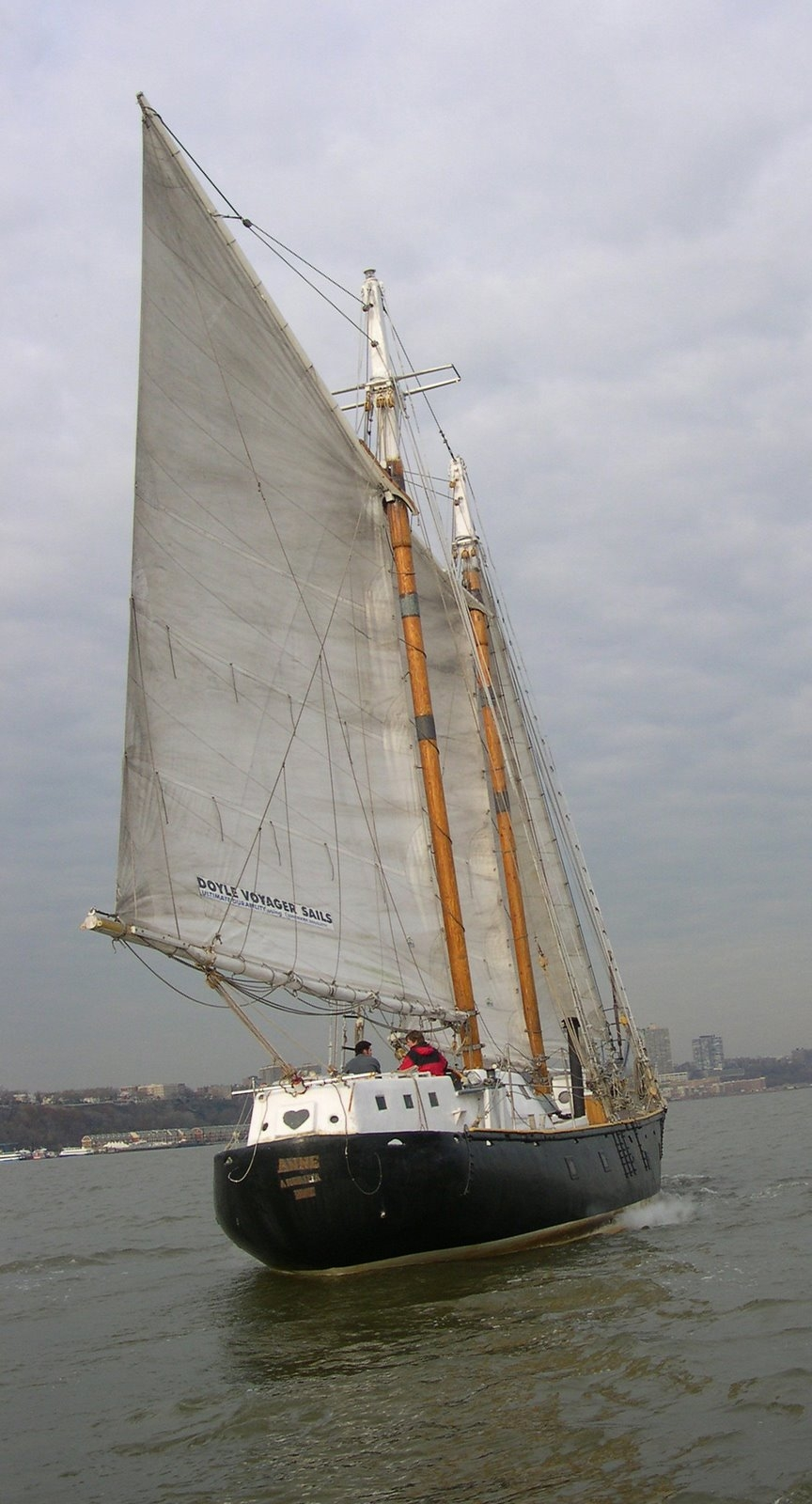
Schooner Anne

The departure put into execution plans that, in some respects, closely resembled those put forth by Stowe and Harrison in a 1992 paper. They had postulated that conditions of confinement and isolation experience during an extended sea voyage would be similar in some respects to those experienced during a voyage to Mars. The name, 1000 Days at Sea: The Mars Ocean Odyssey, the duration and the challenges of the voyage echo concepts that were put forth in the paper and reiterated in the departure press release. The scientific goals that had been outlined in the departure press release—the study of weather, water, atmospheric pollution and ozone depletion in little-documented regions of the world—have not been fully realized due to lack of proper equipment, as indicated by periodic entries in the voyage's log.

An article at the MarineBuzz website explained some of the technical aspects of the schooner's supplies, and summarized Soanya's role in the expedition up to the point where she had to depart the schooner and hand over her tasks to Reid (see below).

Several unexpected events occurred during the course of this voyage, two of them near the outset. On April 25, 2007, the schooner ventured near a US Navy missile firing trial that was being conducted off the New Jersey coast. After United States Coast Guard personnel alerted the schooner, the crew diverted their course with no further mishap. A second, more serious mishap occurred on May 6, 2007, when the schooner ran into a container ship that left the schooner's bowsprit heavily damaged, though the hull and the remainder of the boat was unscathed. Stowe was able to make a replacement, albeit shortened, bowsprit from less-damaged portions. Following these incidents, the vessel spent much of the second half of 2007 in the Southern Atlantic, passing the tip of Africa in mid December, 2007.

==== Soanya leaves the journey ====
One significant incident occurred on February 22, 2008, when Stowe's companion, Soanya Ahmad decided to leave the voyage. After 306 days spent on board the schooner Anne, Ahmad had to disembark due to what later was discovered to be morning sickness. She disembarked from the schooner off Rottnest Island, near Perth, Western Australia. Members from the Royal Perth Yacht Club, including Jon Sanders, rendezvoused with the Anne around 1800 local time (+9 UTC) and assisted with Ms. Ahmad's departure. She arrived in Perth around 2100 local time. Ms. Ahmad reported she had been suffering from chronic seasickness since November. Ms. Ahmad's departure left Stowe without a crew and compromised an original tenet of the voyage, "...to leave the land and all support, sail for 1,000 days, non-stop at sea without receiving help, to live at sea, to be healthy, to send back good messages and have the whole world follow the voyage and understand the importance of it..." Mr. Stowe intended to complete the mission plan alone. According to The Age, the schooner Anne was to maintain a position beyond sight of land during the transfer so Mr Stowe could continue his attempt to break records. Jon Sanders, the current record holder for longest solo time at sea, was asked in an interview whether Reid could break his record. Sanders, who was also a member of Ms. Ahmad's rescue party responded—"I think the boat by the look of it will stay in one piece. It won't break any records." However, he quickly followed that with, "But...I couldn't say anything that it wouldn't...He's still got a lot of patience and time." He then admitted that Reid Stowe could do it—Interviewer: "There's a possibility he could take your record out." Sanders: "Ah, ya."

After leaving the schooner Anne on Day 306, Ahmad returned to New York, where in July 2008, she gave birth to a son, Darshen. Two years later, the whole family would be living aboard the Anne.

==== Completion of the voyage ====
On Day 658, Reid Stowe broke the world record for the longest non-stop ocean voyage, previously held by Jon Sanders, if one disregards Nansen's Fram expedition, during which the schooner Fram lay trapped on ice for nearly three years, and the crew was away from land for at least 1067 days.

Reid Stowe and his support team have since accomplished one of their goals of a person sailing on the open seas without resupply for 1000 days, as well as breaking the 1067-day record set by the Fram in 1896. January 16, 2010, was officially the day of the 1000-day mark, while March 24, 2010, equalled the 1067-day mark. Subsequent to the first 306 days with Soanya Ahmad, Reid Stowe also broke the record for the longest solo sea voyage without resupply, on Day 964 (Dec. 11, 2009). Furthermore, as a two-member male-and-female crew, Stowe and Ahmad could also lay claim to the longest non-stop voyage on the ocean by a man and a woman since Bernard Moitessier and his wife Françoise completed a 126-day voyage in 1966, from Tahiti to Spain.

None of the records claimed by Stowe were ever officially recognized. The World Sailing Speed Record Council explains on their website: "We concentrate on speed record attempts and claims, and no longer recognize "human condition" categories which can expand to such an extent that almost anyone would be able to claim a record of some sort."

Throughout the journey, Stowe maintained contact with the New York City–based support team via an Iridium phone. Stowe employed a VHF marine transceiver for ship-to-ship communications. Volunteers maintained a web site so that the general public could follow the progress of the voyage. The entire route of the schooner Anne was verified daily by GPS tracking, and the manufacturer of the equipment has made the database available online.

Until the computers broke down in December, 2009, there were also almost daily logs—with a photo—sent as email via the satellite telephone. These missives were originally contributed by Soanya and Reid, until Soanya's departure from the schooner, when Reid took over the role of sole communicator.

Reid Stowe saw his son for the first time, after landing his 70-foot schooner 'Anne' in New York and reuniting with girlfriend Soanya Ahmad on Thursday, June 17, 2010. The couple hadn't seen each other since Soanya had to leave the voyage in February, 2008.

== See also ==
- List of circumnavigations
- GPS drawing
- Tania Aebi
- Colin Angus
- Robin Lee Graham
- Roz Savage
- Katie Spotz
- Henk de Velde
