= Miche Wabun Peak =

Mountain in the American state of Montana

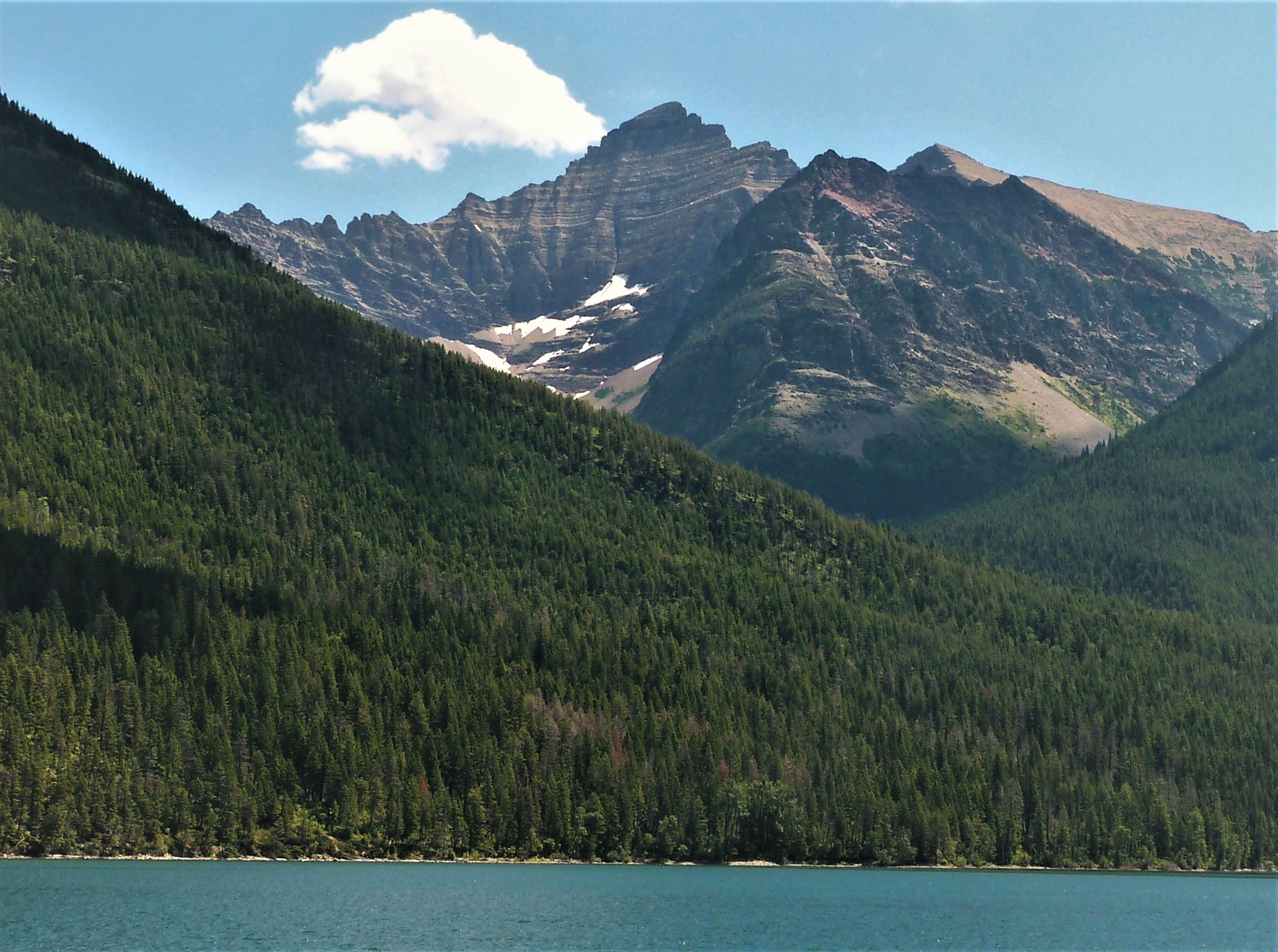

Highest point
- Elevation: 8,866 ft (2,702 m)
- Prominence: 1,021 ft (311 m)
- Coordinates: 48°58′11″N 113°49′52″W

Geography
- Location within Montana Location within the United States
- Location: Glacier County, Montana, U.S.
- Parent range: Lewis Range
- Topo map(s): USGS Mount Cleveland, MT

Climbing
- First ascent: 1962

Miche Wabun Peak (8,866 feet (2,702 m)) is located in the Lewis Range, Glacier National Park in the U.S. state of Montana. Miche Wabun Peak is in the northeastern section of Glacier National Park and is north of Miche Wabun Lake.

== See also ==
- Mountains and mountain ranges of Glacier National Park (U.S.)
