= William Boswell (disambiguation) =

William Boswell (died 1650), English politician.

William Boswell may also refer to:

- William Boswell (cricketer) (1892–1916), English cricketer
- Bill Boswell (1911–1976), Australian politician
