= Edward Boswell =

English antiquarian and solicitor

Edward Boswell (5 April 1760 – 30 October 1842) was an English antiquarian and solicitor. He took up legal practices in Sherborne and Dorchester was a lieutenant in the local Dorset Militia, and served several minor governmental offices in his home county of Dorset. Boswell also published two antiquarian works on the history of Dorset, and a detailed map of the county.

== Career ==
According to his obituary, Edward Boswell was born on 5 April 1760, in Puddletown, Dorset, where his family had lived for "centuries past". In 1780, he was made an apprentice of the solicitor and Clerk of the Peace, John Waller of Dorchester, whom he continued to work with until Waller died in 1792.

After this, Boswell moved to Sherborne, taking up his practice. In 1793, Boswell was appointed Clerk to the Lieutenancy of Dorset, an office he held until his death. The following year, he entered the Dorset Regiment of Militia, became an ensign, and joined the headquarters at Henley-on-Thames. He travelled with this regiment to several locations, including Brighton and Oxford, and attained the rank of lieutenant. In 1795, he resigned from this position and returned to Dorchester, where he founded another practice as an attorney.

In 1800, Henry Fox-Strangways, 2nd Earl of Ilchester, a close friend of Boswell's, made Boswell the steward of the royal manor and liberty of Wyke Regis and Elwell, another office he held until his death. In 1802, he was appointed as the Deputy Receiver General of taxes in Dorset, by the Receiver General, William O'Brien, the earl's brother-in-law. In a congratulatory letter to Boswell, O'Brien indicates he had been obligated to hire Boswell by his employer but would have done so anyway because of "the strong wishes of the Earl of Ilchester to be of service to you". Boswell occupied this office until O'Brien died in 1811. In 1808, the magistrates of quarter sessions appointed Boswell and John Tregonwell King the treasurers of Dorset, an office solely occupied by Boswell upon King's death in 1835.

== Antiquarian work ==
In 1795, under the patronage of the Lord Lieutenant and the county magistrates, Boswell published The Civil Division of the County of Dorset, concerning the civil administration of his home county. The book was revised and enlarged for the second edition of the work, published in 1833. His obituary spoke highly of the work, "whether as a book of reference, or as one of general information connected with the whole civil administration of the county, it is impossible to speak in too high terms of commendation; and the methodical and perfect arrangement of its details, and the quantity and variety of its contents, prove the persevering nature of his character, and the possession of no ordinary genius." Two centuries later, in Boswell's biographical sketch for the Oxford Dictionary of National Biography, historian Jonathan Harris referred to the work as the "standard account of the civil administration of the county".

In 1826, Boswell published another work of local history, The Ecclesiastical Division of the Diocese of Bristol. This book comprised a history of the rise of Christianity in Dorset (especially under the Heptarchy), a catalogue of the particulars of the Diocese of Bristol, and a history of the Archdeaconry of Dorset. His obituary speaks as highly of this work, describing it as the product of the author's "great antiquarian, as well as local, knowledge".

Boswell owned an extensive library comprising mostly antiquarian, topographical, and historical works. In anxiety about Napoleon's planned invasion of the United Kingdom, Boswell also produced a map of his home county in 1804 later lithographed for private circulation. This map was produced mostly with reference to the government and resources of the county, containing: "the site of the beacons, and their communications with each other – the signal-posts erected by the Government – the depôts and places of assembly of the volunteer corps – the number of the inhabitants of the county comprising the volunteers actually serving – the number of persons capable of bearing arms, guides, conductors, &c. and a general summary of the resources of the county as to the live and dead stock, the services to be performed by individuals, supplies to be furnished, the number of mills and ovens, of boats and barges, &c. the whole forming a most complete statistical account of the county in that year, compiled from the returns made under the Act for defence and security of the realm".

== Personal life and death ==
In 1803, Boswell married Edith Feaver, daughter of the vicar of St Marychurch in Devon, Rev. John Feaver. Together, they had one daughter. His "domestic relations" were described as "unexceptionable" in his obituary in the Gentleman's Magazine. Boswell died in his home in Dorchester on 30 October 1842, and was buried in Holy Trinity Church, Dorchester, five days later.

His obituary memorialised his character favourably, recalling him as "a man possessing strong powers of mind and body, and a very retentive memory; he was a cordial lover of books and literature, and he read and digested the best works he could obtain on many subjects... He was never idle, and was a man of most orderly and methodical habits, everything he took in hand being at once reduced to system".
