= A. H. Hawke =

Alfred Herbert Hawke (7 February 1881 – 11 May 1958) was a British photographer and postcard publisher based in Helston, Cornwall.

Alfred Herbert Hawke was born at 11 Richmond Terrace, Lower Easton, Bristol, on 7 February 1881, the son of Richard Hawke and his wife Eliza. They married in Liskeard, Cornwall, and Richard was a cabinet-maker and is thought to have been a native of Helston.

Starting in 1905, Hawke created 8,445 cards in his career, mostly topographical views of the Cornish coast and that of north Devon.
