= Boswell's Corner, Virginia =

Boswell's Corner
- CDP
- Location in Stafford County and the state of Virginia.
- Coordinates: 38°30′19″N 77°22′21″W
- Country: United States
- State: Virginia
- County: Stafford
- Time zone: UTC−5 (Eastern (EST))
  - Summer (DST): UTC−4 (EDT)
- ZIP codes: 22554
- FIPS code: 51-08708
- GNIS feature ID: 2584811

Boswell's Corner is a census-designated place situated in Stafford County, Virginia, United States. As of the 2020 census, Boswell's Corner had a population of 1,656. It is located along U.S. Route 1 just outside the boundary of Marine Corps Base Quantico ("Boswell's Corner" itself is the intersection with Telegraph Road).

== Demographics ==
Historical population
Census	Pop.	Note	%±
2010	1,375		—
2020	1,656		20.4%
U.S. Decennial Census; 2010 2020

Boswell's Corner was first listed as a census designated place in the 2010 U.S. census.

=== 2020 census ===
As of the 2020 census, Boswell's Corner had a population of 1,656. The median age was 30.9 years. 32.1% of residents were under the age of 18 and 5.6% of residents were 65 years of age or older. For every 100 females there were 99.3 males, and for every 100 females age 18 and over there were 94.6 males age 18 and over.

100.0% of residents lived in urban areas, while 0.0% lived in rural areas.

There were 553 households in Boswell's Corner, of which 47.7% had children under the age of 18 living in them. Of all households, 50.1% were married-couple households, 20.4% were households with a male householder and no spouse or partner present, and 23.3% were households with a female householder and no spouse or partner present. About 18.4% of all households were made up of individuals and 5.2% had someone living alone who was 65 years of age or older.

There were 569 housing units, of which 2.8% were vacant. The homeowner vacancy rate was 0.0% and the rental vacancy rate was 6.8%.

Racial composition as of the 2020 census
Race	Number	Percent
White	572	34.5%
Black or African American	391	23.6%
American Indian and Alaska Native	32	1.9%
Asian	72	4.3%
Native Hawaiian and Other Pacific Islander	2	0.1%
Some other race	322	19.4%
Two or more races	265	16.0%
Hispanic or Latino (of any race)	603	36.4%
