= Voice of Nomads =

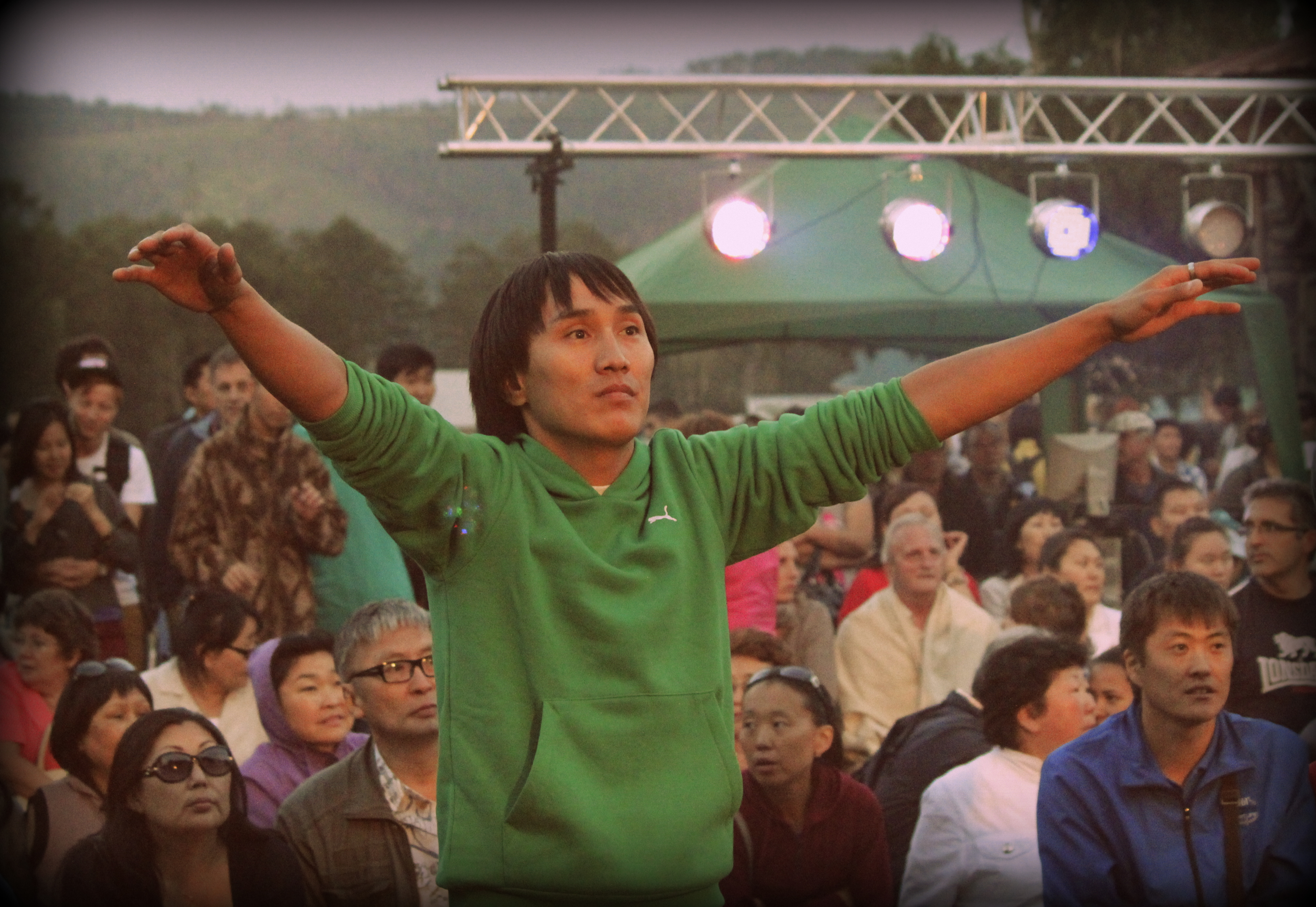

Voice of Nomads ("Голос кочевников") is an international music festival held in Ulan-Ude, Republic of Buryatia in eastern Siberia, Russia. Launched by the Buryat Ministry of culture in 2009, it attracts performers from Europe, Asia, and America. The festival takes place over several days and includes musical performances, exhibitions of traditional clothing and culture, camping, and silk road tourism on the steppes. It is described as "ethnofuturist".

The event is sponsored by the Ministry of Culture, which provides the funds for the event. According to the organisers, the 2017 festival was attended by about 6,500 people.

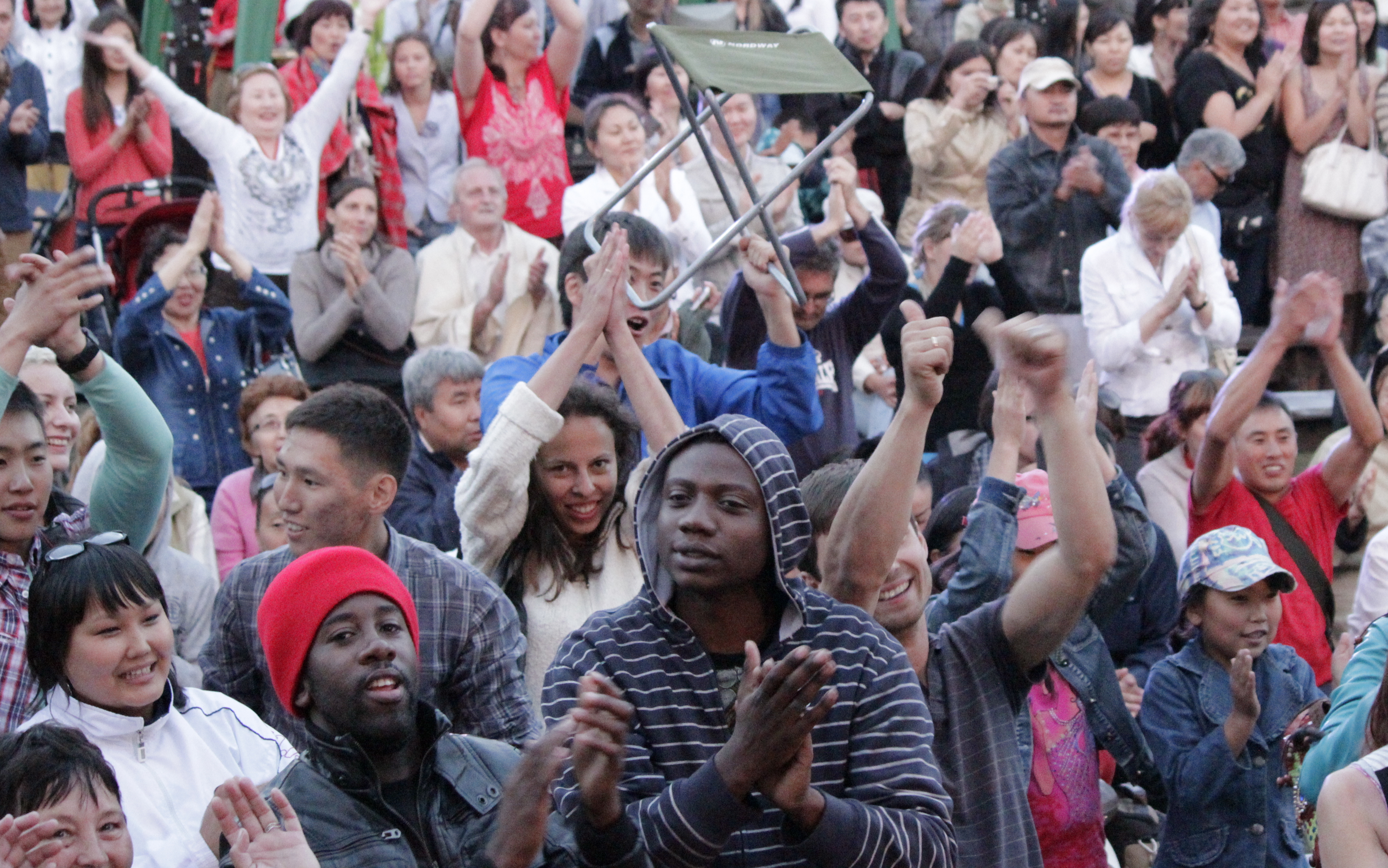
