= Tom Boswell =

Tom Boswell may refer to:

- Tom Boswell (basketball) (born 1953), American basketball player
- Tom Boswell (television presenter) (1943–1990), British radio and television journalist

== See also ==
- Thomas Boswell (born 1947), American sports columnist
