= GPS drawing =

Method of drawing

GPS drawing, also known as GPS art, is a method of drawing where an artist uses a Global Positioning System (GPS) device and follows a pre-planned route to create a large-scale picture or pattern. The .GPX data file recorded during the drawing process is then visualised, usually overlaying it as a line on a map of the area. Artists usually run or cycle the route—while cars, vans, boats and aeroplanes are utilized to create larger pieces.

The first known GPS drawing was made by Reid Stowe in 1999. "Voyage of the Turtle" is an ocean sized drawing with a 5,500 mile circumference in the Atlantic made using a sailboat. The GPS data was recorded in logbooks and was therefore very low resolution.

In 2000, after the US Military GPS satellite signals were opened up to the public, artists Jeremy Wood and Hugh Pryor were able to use a newly available GPS tracker to record their movements. To display their drawings Hugh Pryor wrote a computer program which converted the GPX data into a single line to be shown on screen or to be turned into an image file. With these tools in place GPS drawing as distinct artform was able to develop.

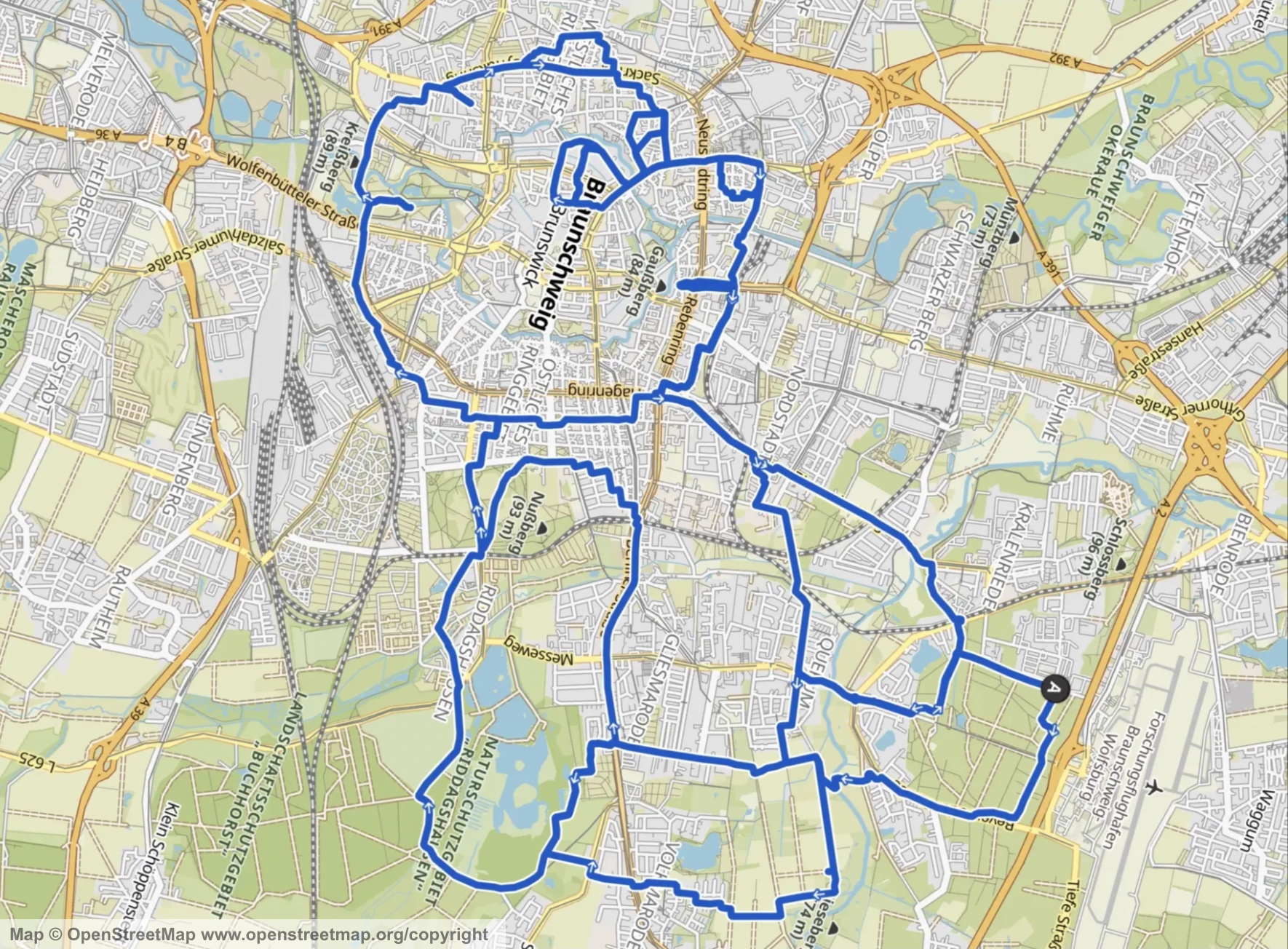
"Teddy Bear" planned and drawn by Volker Weinlich. Volker cycled this 60km long route in Braunschweig, Germany

== Planning ==
GPS artists can spend many hours finding a certain image or text hidden in a map or can sometimes simply see an existing image in a map due to pareidolia. In many cities and towns the road layout and landscape restricts the routes available so artists have to find creative ways to show their pictures or characters. In cities where there is a strong grid pattern 8-bit-style or pixelated images can be created of almost any object or shape. Many artists will create paper or digital maps of their route to follow on their journey.

Several websites have arisen (including RouteDoodle.com, GPSArtify.com and RouteSketcher.com) to aid in the planning process.

== Artistic style ==
There are many approaches to GPS drawing which an artist can choose depending on their means of travel and the landscape around them.

=== Roads, trails, and paths only ===
One style uses only pre-existing roads, paths, trails, etc. This can make it more challenging to find a route and plan the artwork. Working on pre-existing routes can make navigation easier, and the artwork is more likely to reflect the original plan. This is how the majority of GPS drawings are made.

=== Freehand ===
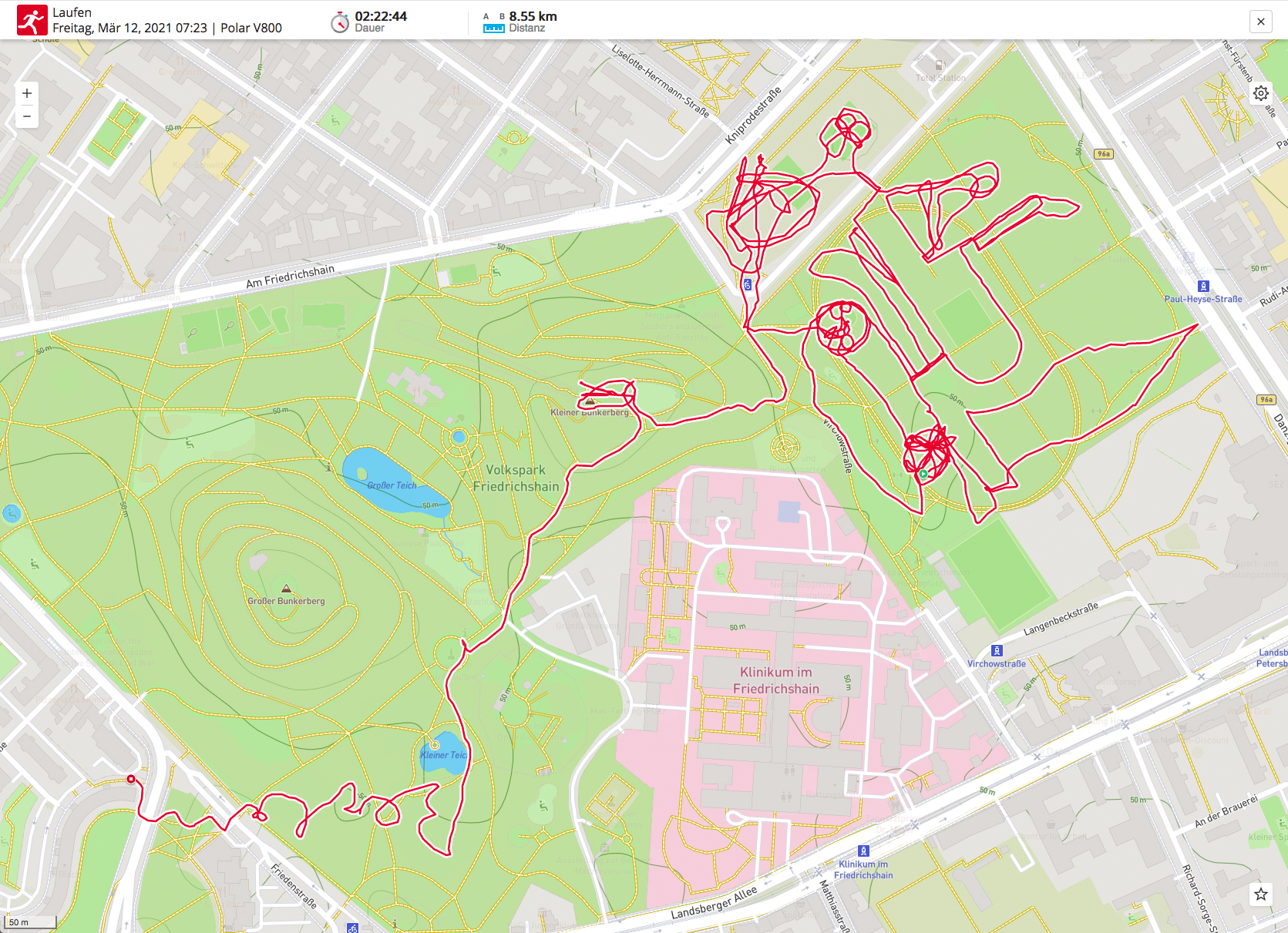
Freehand GPS Art, drawn by Michael Kutzner with running in Volkspark Friedrichshain, Berlin, Germany. 8,5 km

In freehand GPS drawing, an artist creates a shape on open ground, air, or water without following existing paths. This means the artist has to watch their progress in real time on their GPS device. Artists can run or cycle over open ground such as parks, fields, and car parks. Artists in cars and other motor vehicles can draw shapes on large open areas such as deserts, airfields, and beaches. Almost all artworks created by aircraft and watercraft use this technique as they are not restricted by human and physical geography. Freehand GPS drawing opens unlimited possibilities but without waypoints and existing routes it is very easy to lose track of your progress and make mistakes.

=== Connect the dots ===
By pausing the GPS device and restarting it at different locations an artist is able to draw straight lines across the map in a similar way to a connect the dots puzzle. This means the artist can draw over the built environment and over physical barriers such as rivers and hills.

=== Adding extra images ===
Some artists add extra images or lines to the map after they have created the route. They can simply add googly eyes to an animal or face or go further and add lines and other features which help viewers see what they have drawn. Other times an artist will show a photo or other image alongside their drawing if it is not clear at first glance what has been drawn.

=== Other methods ===
Artists can collaborate with each other or members of the public to create larger images, visualisations, collages and even GPS animations from multiple GPX files or routes images. GPS devices can also be given to people or attached to vehicles which are tracked as they go about normal life or take part in specific activities and the GPX data is then visualised.

In the freestyle method of GPS drawing, the path followed by the GPS receiver is random or semi random following set of pre determined rules.

=== Burbing ===
Burbing – a term derived from the word suburb – is the practice of cycling every road in a suburb and tracking this on GPS to create an intricate pattern. One of the first examples of burbing was created by cyclist Christian Lloyd in 2014. Burbing became a more widespread trend during the COVID-19 pandemic, when wider travel was restricted.

== Display ==
Most people use a route mapping app or other service to display their drawing online and to share on social media. Popular apps include Strava, Map My Run, and Garmin. Many artists also import their route into Google Maps, OpenStreetMap, Viewranger, and other map services before capturing the image to display and share. This gives the artist the option of expanding and cropping the image, orienting it another way, or tilting the map to add perspective. Some artists use false color maps with contrasting colors for their route to create vivid images.

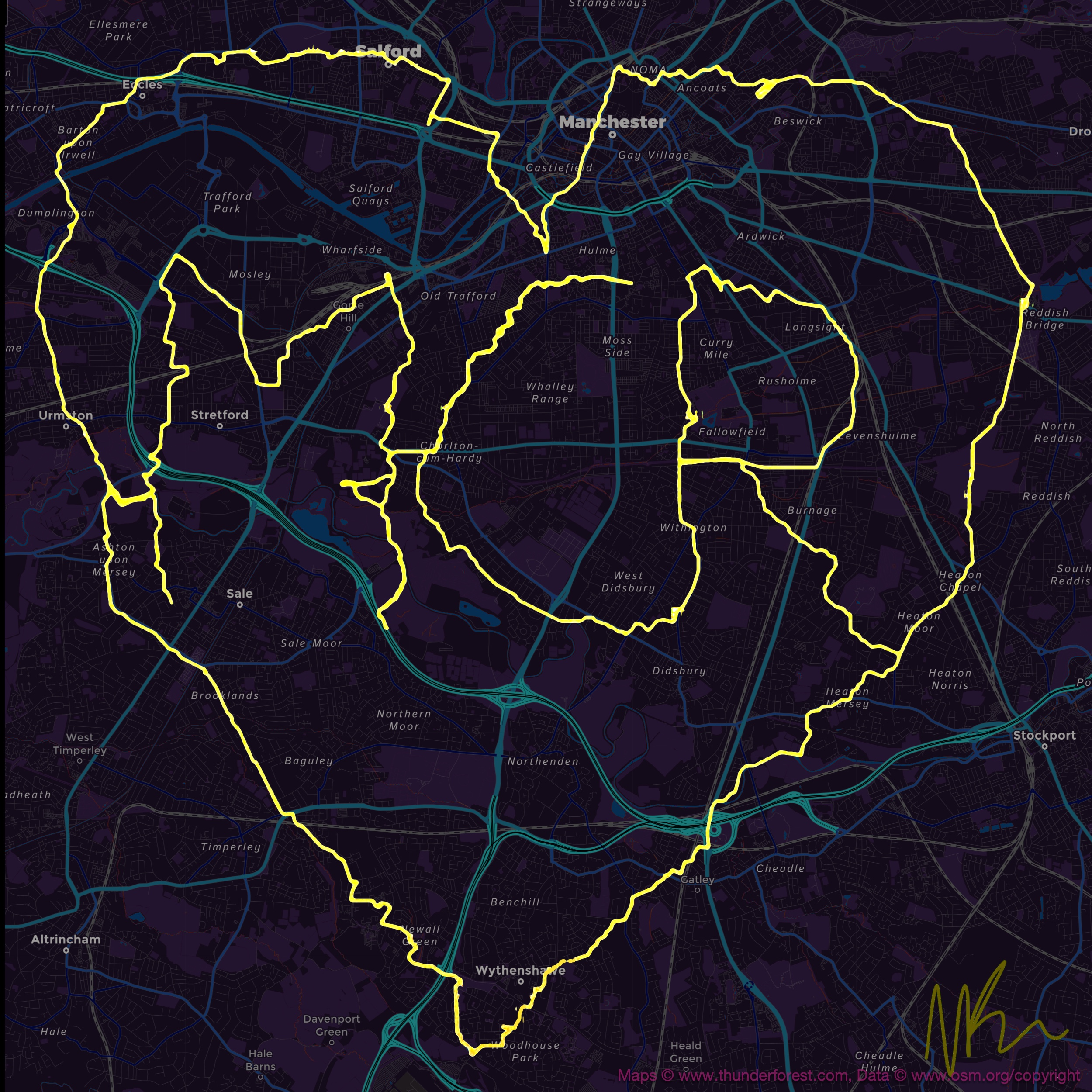
A GPS Drawing made to commemorate the victims of the Manchester Arena Bombing (Image:Nathan Rae).

Artist Jeremy Wood often displays his drawings without a showing any map underneath. He is able to do this as the drawings are so detailed you can see the shape of the built environment or landscape in the lines. One work, "Traverse Me", maps out the University of Warwick campus and includes the map title, other text and images, a compass, scale, and date signature. It was made by walking 238 miles over 17 days.

== Examples and artists ==
Though several artists were experimenting with and creating art through GPS since the 1980s, in 1999, Reid Stowe became the first documented artist to employ waypoints on a GPS-verified journey in order to render a large-scale art object. Stowe was inspired by the work of Bas Jan Aders "In search of the miraculous" (1975) and the walked line art pieces of land artist Richard Long.

Stowes work of GPS art, representing a baby sea turtle (1900 miles long and 1400 miles wide, with a perimeter of 5,500 miles), was performed with a two-masted schooner during the Voyage of the Sea Turtle. He made two more large GPS-verified drawings on his 1000-day voyage.

The idea was first implemented on land by artists Hugh Pryor and Jeremy Wood, whose work includes a 13-mile wide fish in Oxfordshire, spiders with legs 21 miles long in Port Meadow, Oxford, and "the world's biggest "IF'" with a total length is 537 km, and the height of the drawing in typographic units is 319,334,400 points. Typical computer fonts at standard resolutions are between 8 and 12 points.

The largest text written using a GPS device was "PEACE on Earth (60,794.07km)" in 2015 created by Yassan. This was created by travelling around the entire globe by plane. Yassan also made headlines by proposing to his girlfriend with "Marry Me" a 7,163.7 km route covering most of Japan.

In 2018 artist Nathan Rae created a #WeLoveManchester piece as part of the commemorations of the Manchester Arena Bombing.

One of the most prolific GPS artists is the artist known as WallyGPX who, as of October 2018, has created over 500 pieces of GPS art. He uses pencil and paper to plan the routes around his home city of Baltimore which he then creates by bicycle.

== Records ==
Guinness World Records recognises several records for largest GPS drawings by various means of transport, by individuals or teams. Record-winning images have included a heart, a Latin cross, and a velociraptor.

== See also ==
•Nazca lines

•Geoglyph

•Neogeography

•Anamorphosis
