= Sofa Mountain =

Mountain in Waterton Lakes NP, Canada

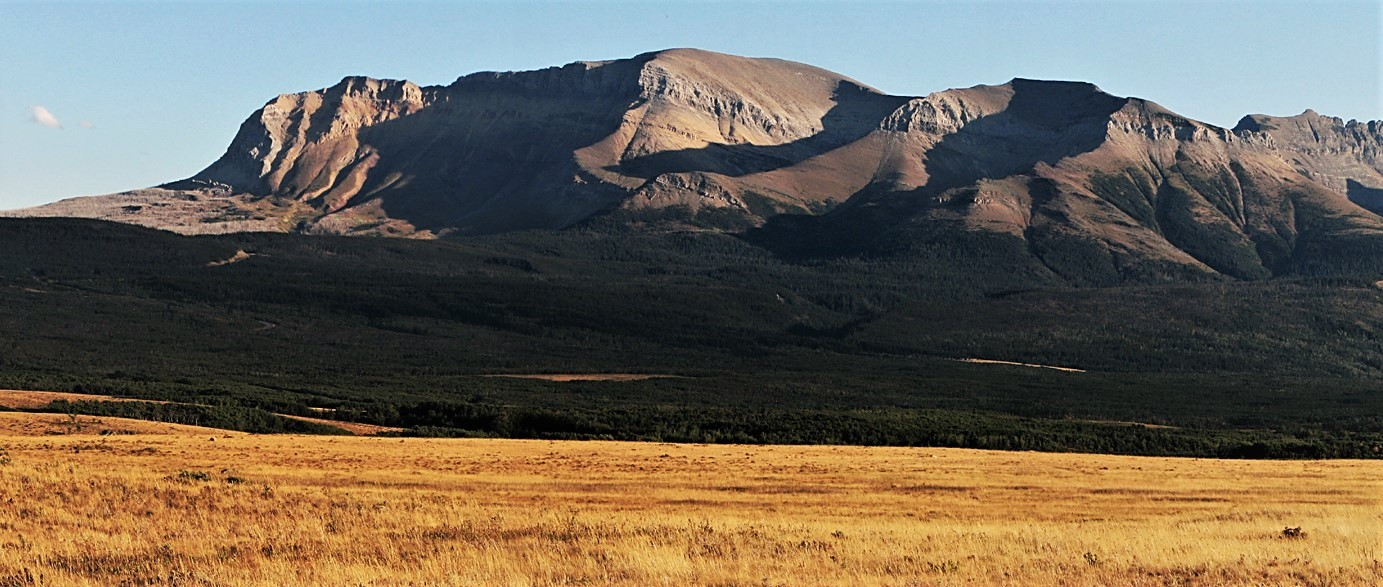
- North aspect

Highest point
- Elevation: 2,515 m (8,251 ft)
- Prominence: 38 m (125 ft)
- Parent peak: Crypt Peak (2,615 m)
- Isolation: 4.59 km (2.85 mi)
- Coordinates: 49°01′17″N 113°47′09″W

Naming
- Etymology: Sofa (descriptive)

Geography
- Location within Alberta Location within Canada
- Interactive map of Sofa Mountain
- Location: Alberta, Canada
- Parent range: Canadian Rockies; Lewis Range
- Topo map: NTS 82H4 Waterton Lakes

Geology
- Rock age: Cambrian
- Rock type: Sedimentary rock

Climbing
- Easiest route: Scrambling Northeast Ridge

Sofa Mountain is a 2,515-meter (8,251-foot) summit located in Waterton Lakes National Park, in Alberta, Canada. It is part of the Lewis Range which is a subset of the Canadian Rockies, and is the easternmost mountain in the Canadian Rockies, as well as the park. It is situated 5.4 km (3.4 mi) east of Vimy Peak, and the nearest higher neighbor is Crypt Peak, 4.6 km (2.9 mi) to the southwest. Topographic relief is significant as the north aspect rises over 1,220 meters (4,000 feet) above Middle Waterton Lake in approximately six kilometers (3.7 mi).

== History ==
The mountain was named in 1865 by Kootenay Brown who wrote: "Coming down from the mountain, where we got our first glimpse of the buffalo, we soon reached the prairie shore of a large lake at the further side of which a mountain rose to a sofa-like peak among the clouds. This mountain was afterwards called Sofa Mountain." This mountain's name was officially adopted in 1943 by the Geographical Names Board of Canada.

== Geology ==
Like other mountains in Waterton Lakes National Park, Sofa Mountain is composed of sedimentary rock laid down during the Precambrian to Jurassic periods. Formed in shallow seas, this sedimentary rock was initially uplifted beginning 170 million years ago when the Lewis Overthrust fault pushed an enormous slab of precambrian rocks 3 mi (4.8 km) thick, 50 miles (80 km) wide and 160 miles (260 km) long over younger rock of the cretaceous period.

== Climate ==
Based on the Köppen climate classification, Sofa Mountain has an alpine subarctic climate with cold, snowy winters, and mild summers. Temperatures can drop below −20 °C with wind chill factors below −30 °C. Precipitation runoff from Sofa Mountain drains to the Waterton River and Belly River.

== Gallery ==
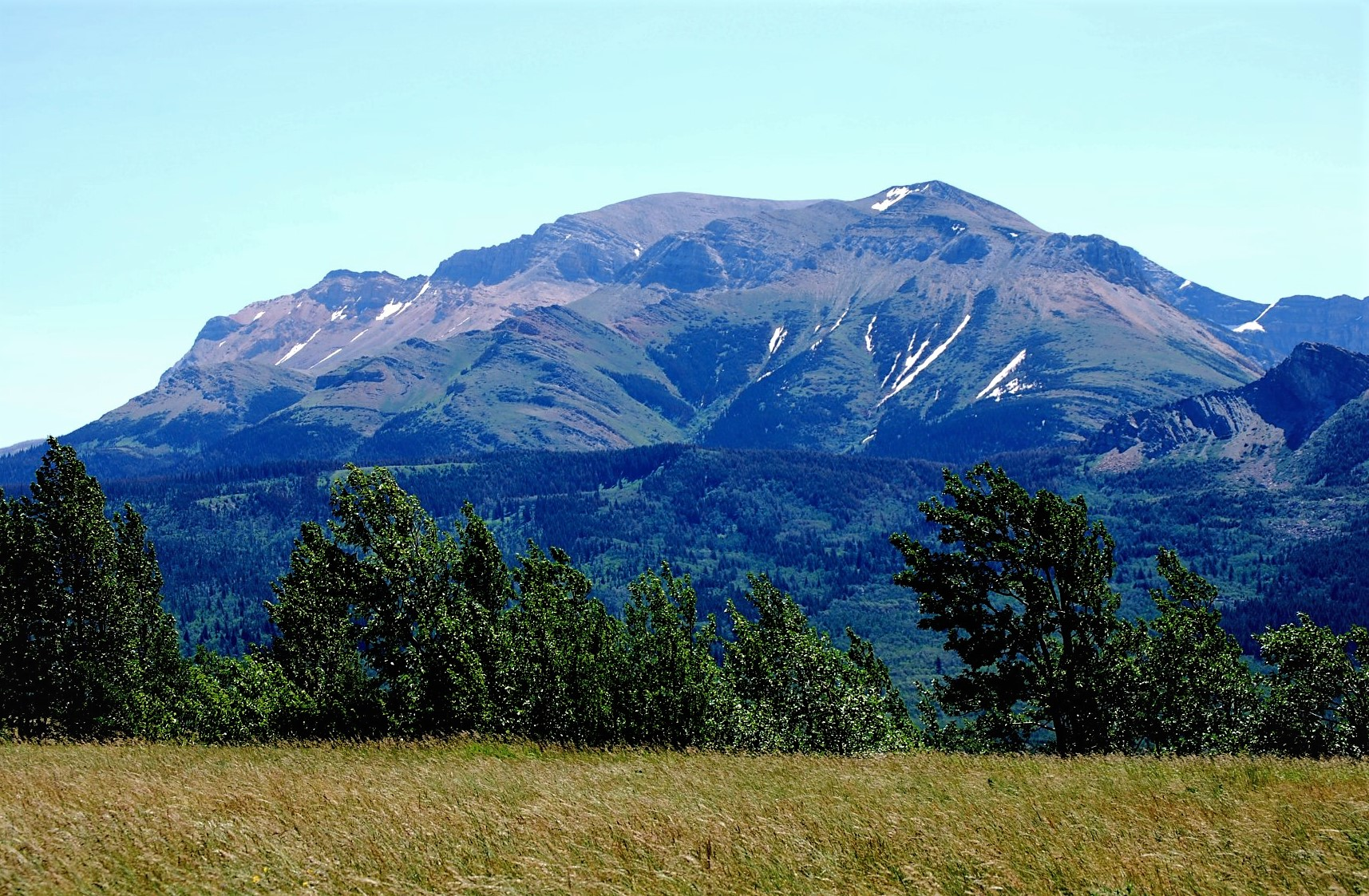
Northwest aspect

== See also ==
- Geology of the Rocky Mountains
- Geology of Alberta
