= Crypt Lake Trail =

Hiking trail in Alberta, Canada

Coordinates: 49°00′05″N 113°50′28″W

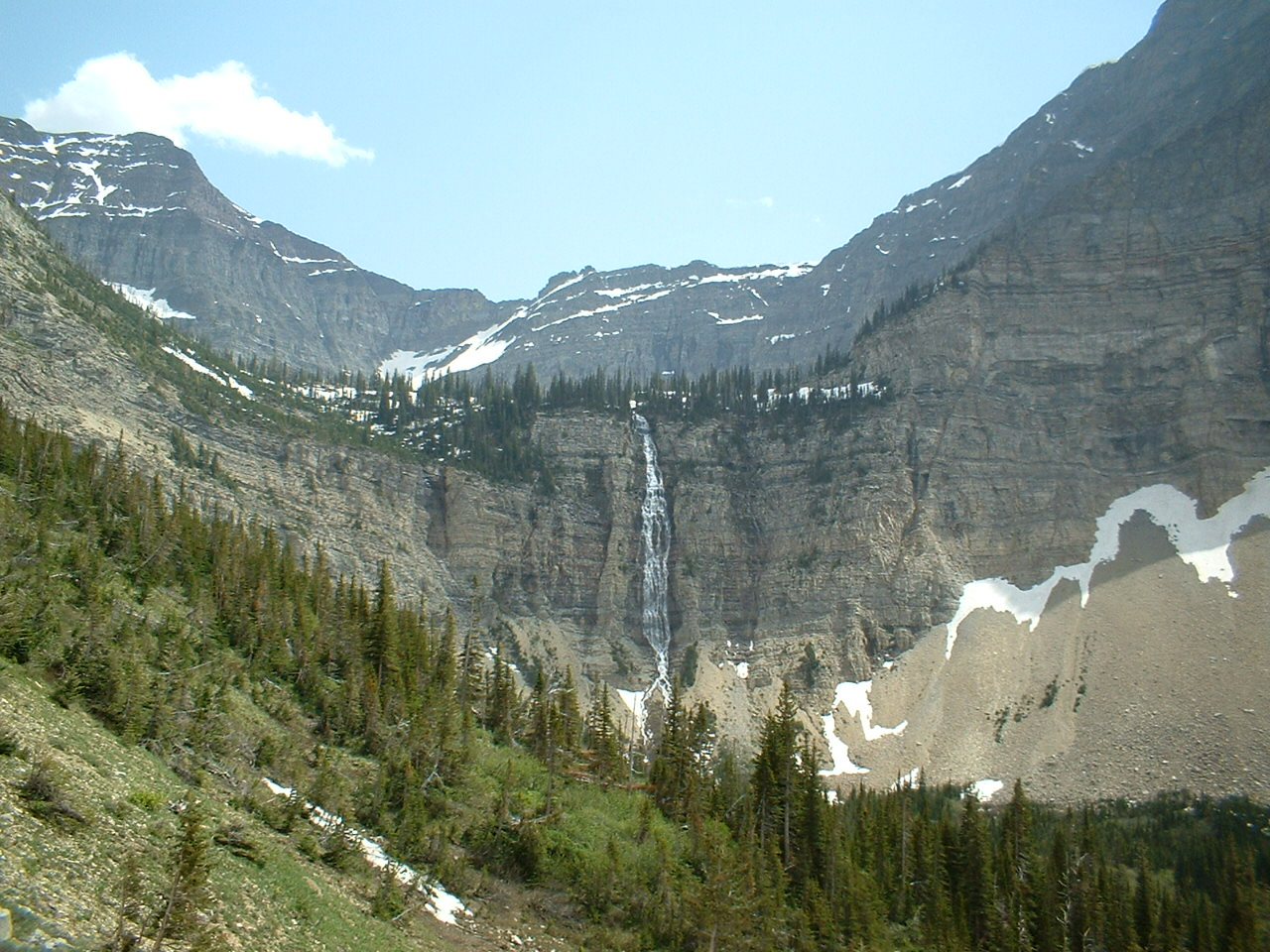
Crypt Falls

The Crypt Lake Trail is a hiking trail in Waterton Lakes National Park in Alberta, Canada. It is accessed by a dedicated ferry service operating from the Waterton Park Townsite.

The first part of the trail offers the choice of two alternate routes for ascent and return running through forest, the longer of which passes the Hellroaring Falls. After that the trail becomes an open walk through a valley crossing small mountain streams and leading up to the views of Crypt Falls. The cascading Crypt Falls are over 150 metres (490 ft) high and are fed by Crypt Lake in the hanging valley above the falls. The last part of the trail is the ascent to Crypt Lake. This part is more challenging; in parts the walk runs at the edge of steep drops, secured by cable and also involves crawling through a narrow, but short, tunnel. Finally the trail reaches the shores of Crypt Lake through a small forest.

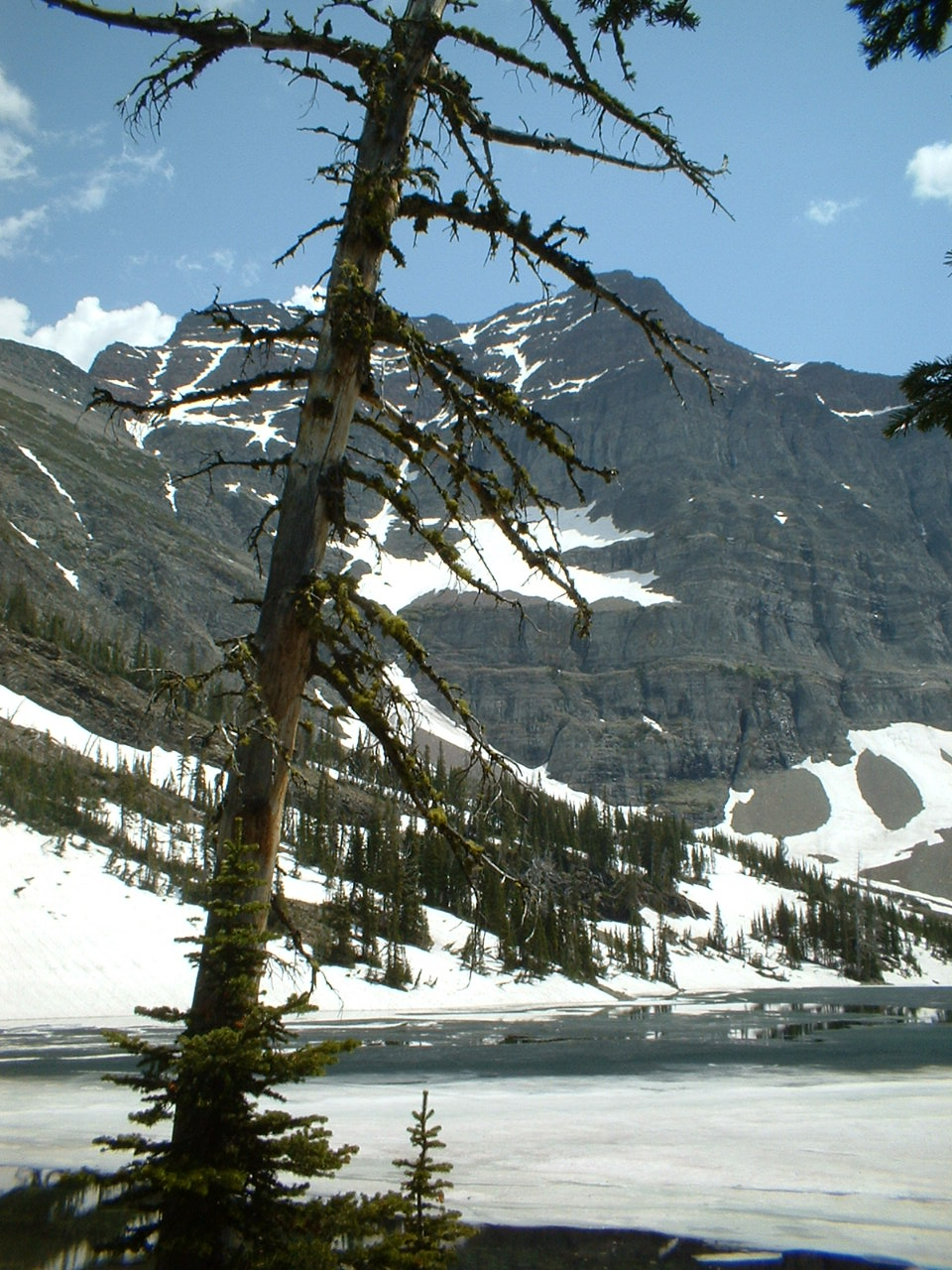
The shores of Crypt Lake with Crypt Peak in back

== Crypt Lake ==
Crypt Lake is a pristine alpine lake occupying a cirque that often has ice into August. Most of the area around the lake is covered in scree and/or snow, and hiking around the circumference of the lake requires approximately 45 minutes. Wildlife can be spotted in the mountains towering above including mountain goat and bighorn sheep. From Crypt Lake it is only a short walk to the edge of Crypt Falls with views over the valley below.

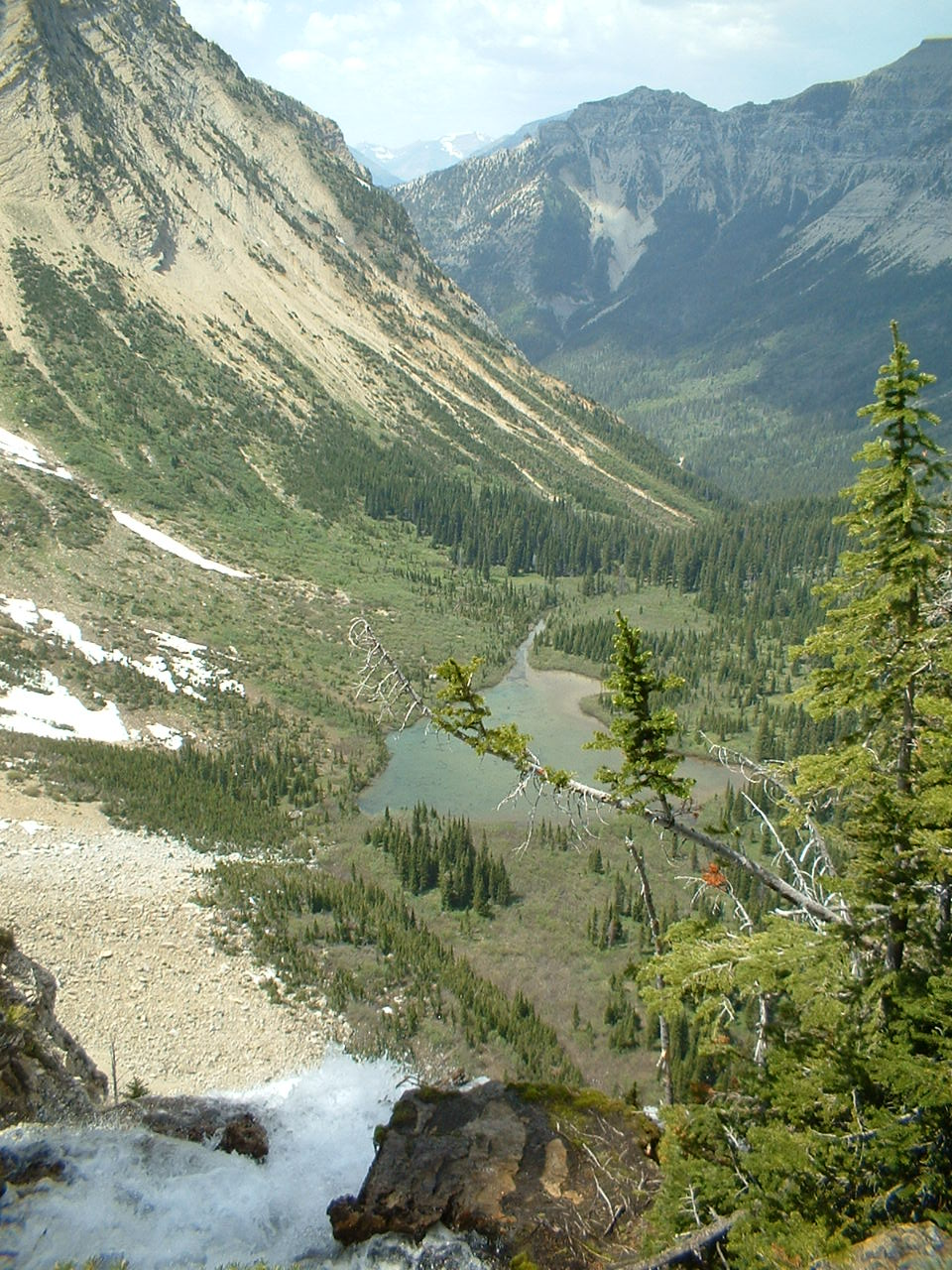
A view from the brink of Crypt Falls of the valley below.

== Hiking ==
The Crypt Lake Hike was voted "Canada's Best Hike" in 1981. The hike is accessed via the local ferry service, and begins with a gradual climb through shaded forests. As visitors progress into the hanging valley, the forest begins to thin out, and the strenuous section of the hike begins. Immediately after Burnt Rock Falls, the hike steadily climbs up onto the open alpine mountain side. This section of the hike, offers views of the Crypt Valley as well as that of the cascading Crypt Falls.

After hiking along the mountain side, hikers arrive at the Crypt Lake Campground. This camping area was provided for overnight backpackers and was equipped with an outhouse and fireplace. However, the campground is now permanently closed and is no longer equipped with a fireplace. After continuing over the alpine creek adjacent to the campground, hikers follow the trail towards the ledge and tunnel. The ledge is about 50 centimetres (20 in) wide, and continues over to a steel ladder and access to the tunnel. For nearly 30 metres (100 ft), hikers crawl through a natural mountain tunnel before arriving at the cable transverse. This section of the hike involves a scramble along a sheer cliff, with the assistance of a steel cable. After the scramble, the route passes through a shaded forest before arriving at Crypt Lake. The hike is a total of 17.2 kilometres (10.7 mi) round trip, with a gradual 700-metre (2,300 ft) elevation gain.

The southern tip of Crypt Lake skirts Canada's international border with the United States, and the trail enters the United States for less than 50 metres (160 ft). However, there is no border-related signage or warnings, and no legal consequences for hikers, as entry any further into the United States at this location is impossible due to cliffs at the south end of the lake.

== Wildlife ==
The slopes along the Crypt Lake Trail are primary grizzly bear and black bear habitat. Other large mammal species that call the Crypt Valley home include bighorn sheep, moose, mountain goat, mule deer and white-tailed deer. It is not uncommon to see striped or least chipmunk frequenting the trail, as well as other rodent species, such as hoary marmot, yellow-bellied marmot, red squirrel and Richardson's ground squirrel. Crypt Lake itself is stocked with cutthroat trout and is one of several destinations for local fishermen in the park.

== Ferry service ==
Ferry service from the Waterton townsite brings hikers to the trail head and returns to pick them up. The time span between drop-off and pickup is reasonable to perform the whole trail. There is no potable drinking water provided at the trail head (ferry landing site) or anywhere along the trail. There is an outhouse at the start of the trail where the ferry docks, and near the top of the trail at the designated campground before crossing to the cave entrance.
