= Crypt Falls =

Coordinates: 49°00′20″N 113°50′30″W

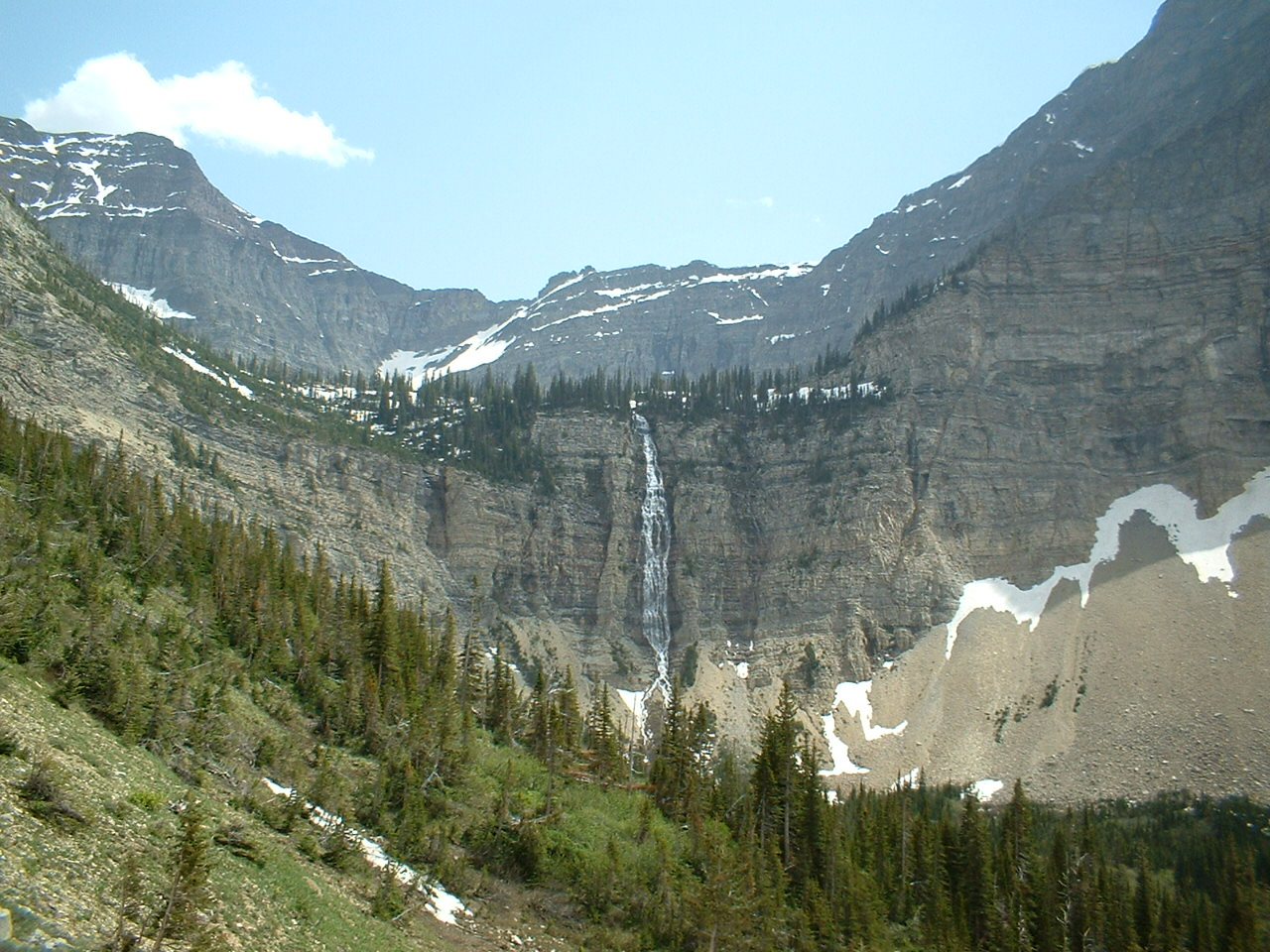
- Crypt Falls

- Location within Alberta
- Location: Waterton Lakes National Park, Alberta, Canada
- Type: Horsetail
- Total height: 175 m (574 ft)
- Number of drops: 1
- Longest drop: 175 m (574 ft)

Crypt Falls is a waterfall in southwestern Alberta in Waterton Lakes National Park. It is viewable from the Crypt Lake Trail via ferry service from the Waterton town-site. It drops out of Crypt Lake and feeds a smaller lake below it. The true height of the fall is unknown but it is estimated to be taller than it currently is listed as.

== See also ==
- List of waterfalls
- List of waterfalls in Canada
