= Vimy Peak =

Mountain in Waterton Lakes NP, Canada

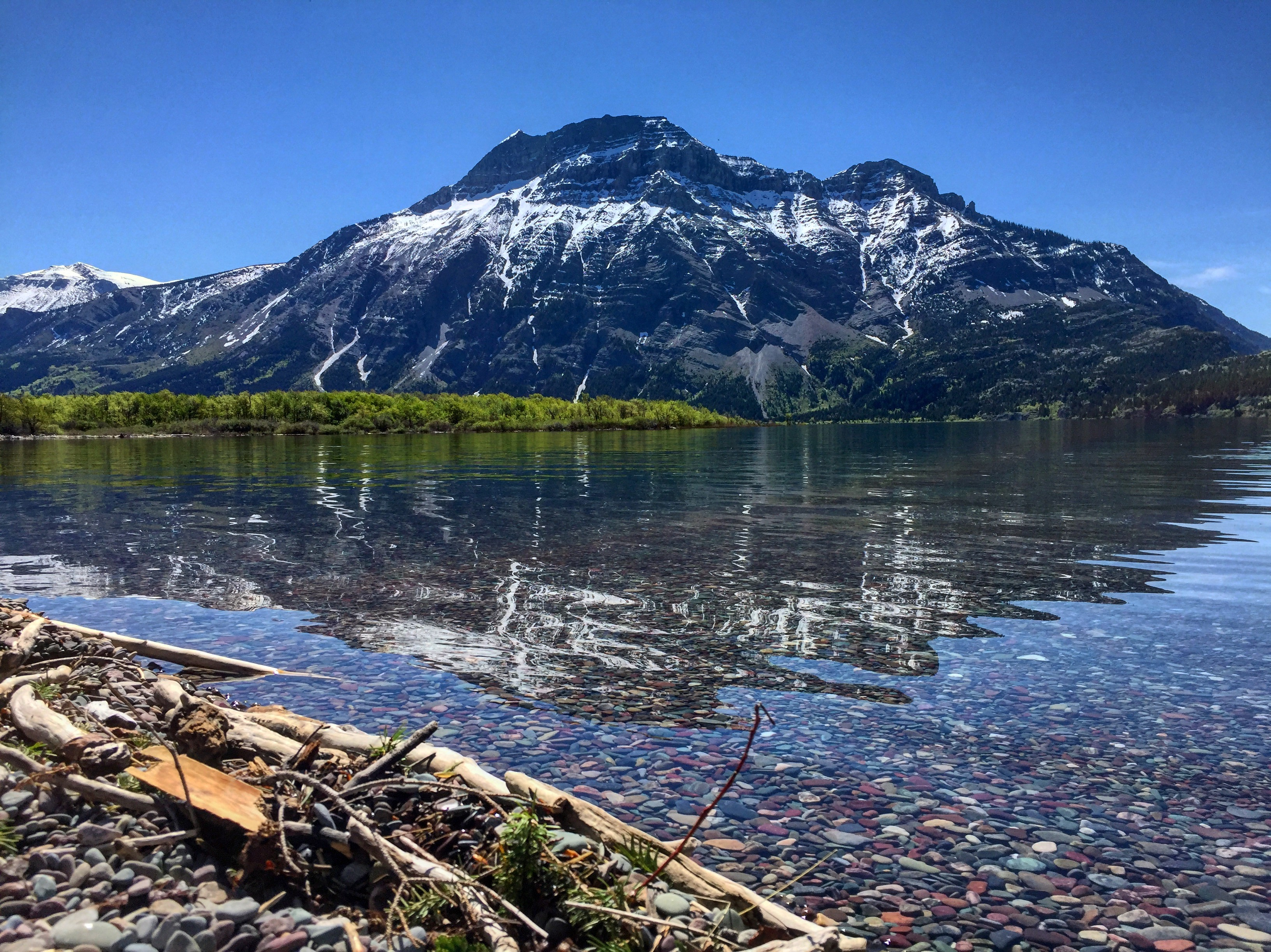
- Vimy Peak

Highest point
- Elevation: 2,385 m (7,825 ft)
- Prominence: 190 m (620 ft)
- Parent peak: Arras Peak (2423 m)
- Listing: Mountains of Alberta
- Coordinates: 49°02′18″N 113°51′29″W

Geography
- Location within Alberta Location within Canada
- Interactive map of Vimy Peak
- Location: Alberta, Canada
- Parent range: Canadian Rockies
- Topo map: NTS 82H4 Waterton Lakes

Geology
- Rock age: Cambrian

Climbing
- Easiest route: Hiking trail

Vimy Peak is a 2,385-metre (7,825-foot) summit located in Waterton Lakes National Park, in the Canadian Rockies of Alberta, Canada. It is set along the east shore of Waterton Lake on the opposite side from Waterton Park townsite. It is situated 5.4 km (3.4 mi) west of Sofa Mountain, and the nearest higher neighbor is Arras Peak, 3.1 km (1.9 mi) to the southeast. Vimy Peak anchors the northern end of Vimy Ridge, which stretches three kilometers to Arras Peak anchoring the southern end.

== History ==
In 1917, the mountain—which had been labelled as Sheep Mountain on George Dawson's 1886 map, and Goat Mountain in Kootenay Brown—was renamed in honour of the Canadian Army's significant victory at the Battle of Vimy Ridge. According to a 1989 article in the Proceedings of the Geologists' Association journal, This mountain's name was officially adopted in 1943 by the Geographical Names Board of Canada.

== Geology ==
Like other mountains in Waterton Lakes National Park, Vimy Peak is composed of sedimentary rock laid down during the Precambrian to Jurassic periods. Formed in shallow seas, this sedimentary rock was pushed east and over the top of younger Cretaceous period rock during the Laramide orogeny.

== Climate ==
Based on the Köppen climate classification, Vimy Peak is located in a subarctic climate with cold, snowy winters, and mild summers. Temperatures can drop below −20 °C with wind chill factors below −30 °C. Precipitation runoff from Vimy Peak drains into Waterton Lake, thence Waterton River.

== Gallery ==
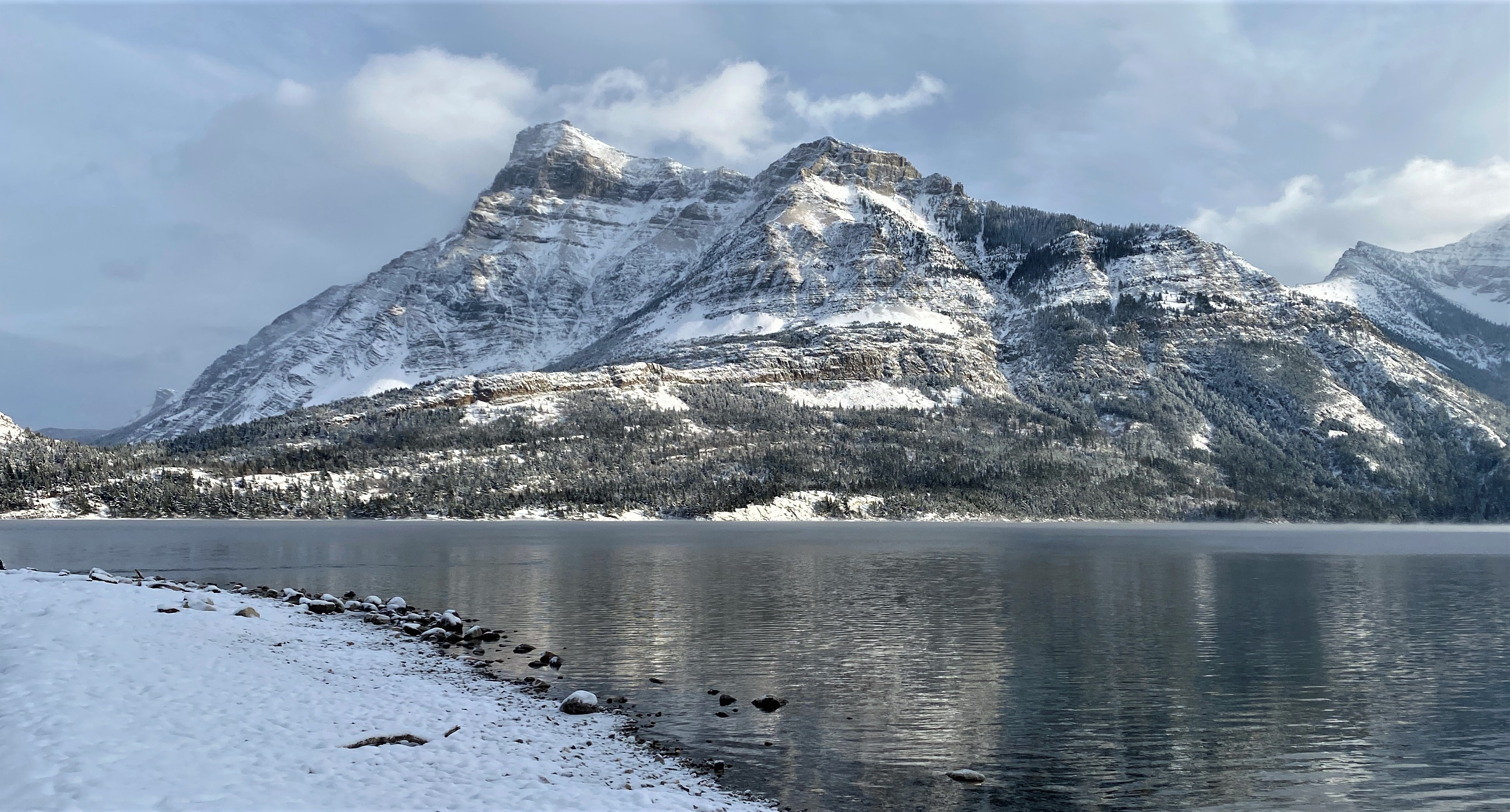

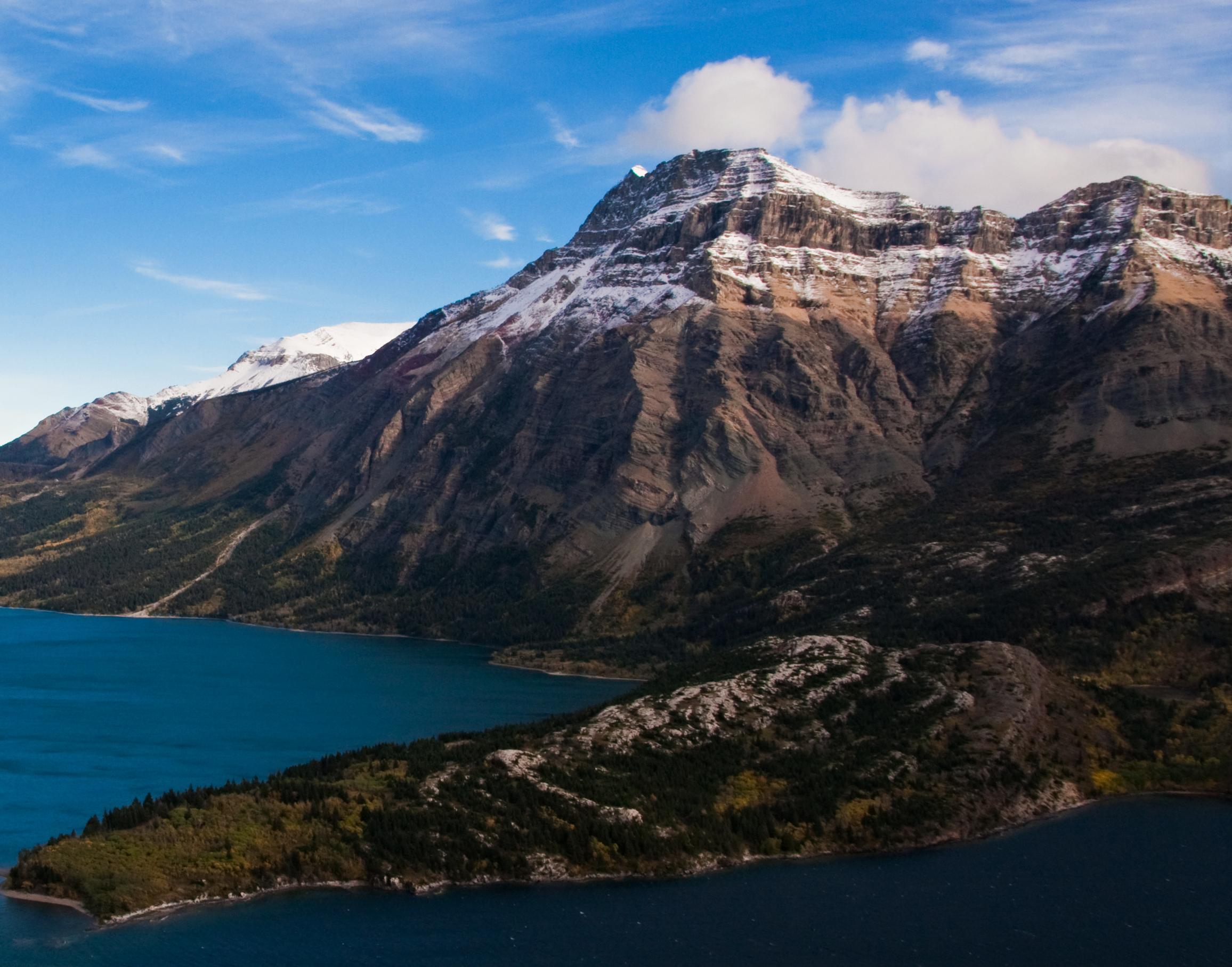
Vimy Peak above Waterton Lake

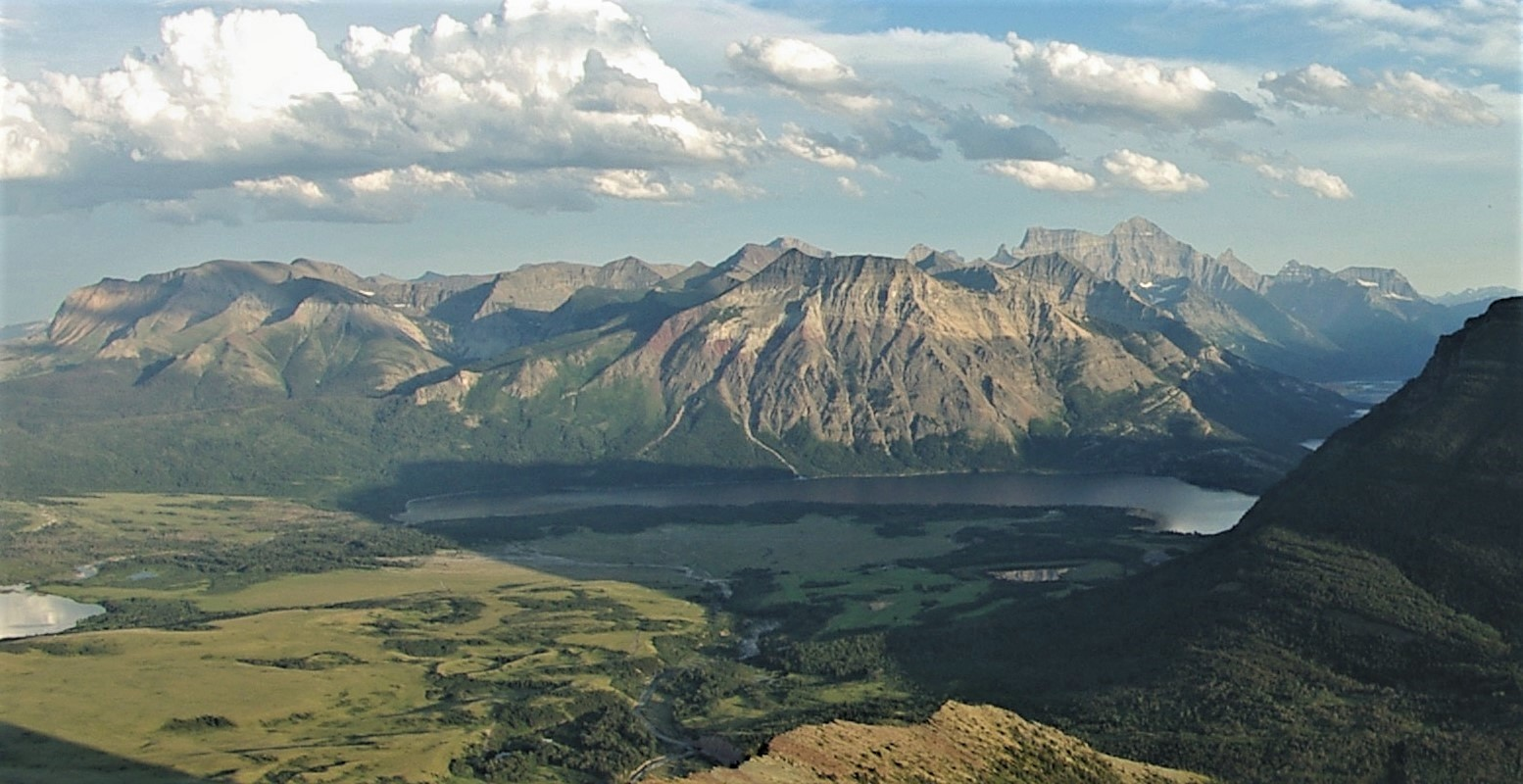
Sofa Mountain, Vimy Peak, and Mt. Cleveland seen from Bellevue Peak

== See also ==
- Geography of Alberta
