= Crypt Peak =

Mountain summit in Glacier National Park

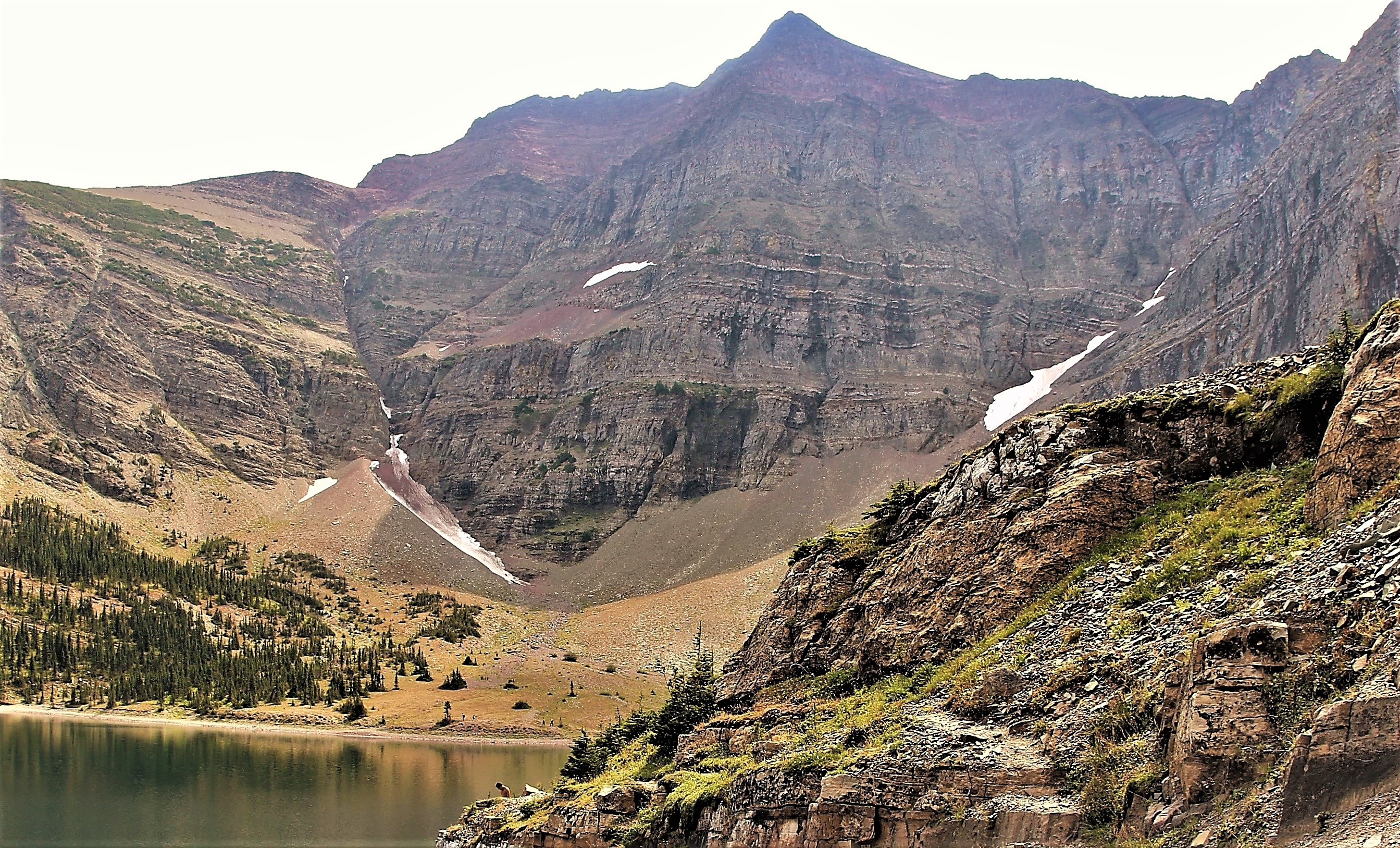
- West aspect above Crypt Lake

Highest point
- Elevation: 8,579 ft (2,615 m)
- Prominence: 1,021 ft (311 m)
- Parent peak: Miche Wabun Peak (8,861 ft)
- Isolation: 1.59 mi (2.56 km)
- Coordinates: 48°59′53″N 113°49′30″W

Geography
- Location within Montana Location within the United States
- Location: Glacier National Park; Glacier County, Montana, U.S.
- Parent range: Lewis Range; Rocky Mountains
- Topo map: USGS Mount Cleveland

Geology
- Rock age: Precambrian
- Rock type: Sedimentary rock

Crypt Peak is an 8,579-foot (2,615 m) mountain summit located in Glacier National Park, in Glacier County of the U.S. state of Montana. It is situated along the Canada–United States border, above Crypt Lake, and is partially within Waterton Lakes National Park. Crypt Peak is part of the Lewis Range, and is approximately three miles east of Waterton Lake. Topographic relief is significant as Crypt Peak rises over 2,100 feet (640 meters) above Crypt Lake in approximately one-half mile (1.6 km), and 4,400 ft (1,340 m) above Waterton Lake in three miles (4.8 km). Precipitation runoff from the mountain drains west to Waterton Lake, and east to Belly River. This geographical feature's name has not yet been officially adopted by the United States Board on Geographic Names.

== Climate ==
Based on the Köppen climate classification, Crypt Peak is located in an alpine subarctic climate zone characterized by long, usually very cold winters, and short, cool to mild summers. Temperatures can drop below −10 °F with wind chill factors below −30 °F.

== Geology ==
Like the mountains in Glacier National Park, Crypt Peak is composed of sedimentary rock laid down during the Precambrian to Jurassic periods. Formed in shallow seas, this sedimentary rock was initially uplifted beginning 170 million years ago when the Lewis Overthrust fault pushed an enormous slab of precambrian rocks 3 mi (4.8 km) thick, 50 miles (80 km) wide and 160 miles (260 km) long over younger rock of the cretaceous period. The reddish rock at the top of Crypt Peak is argillite.

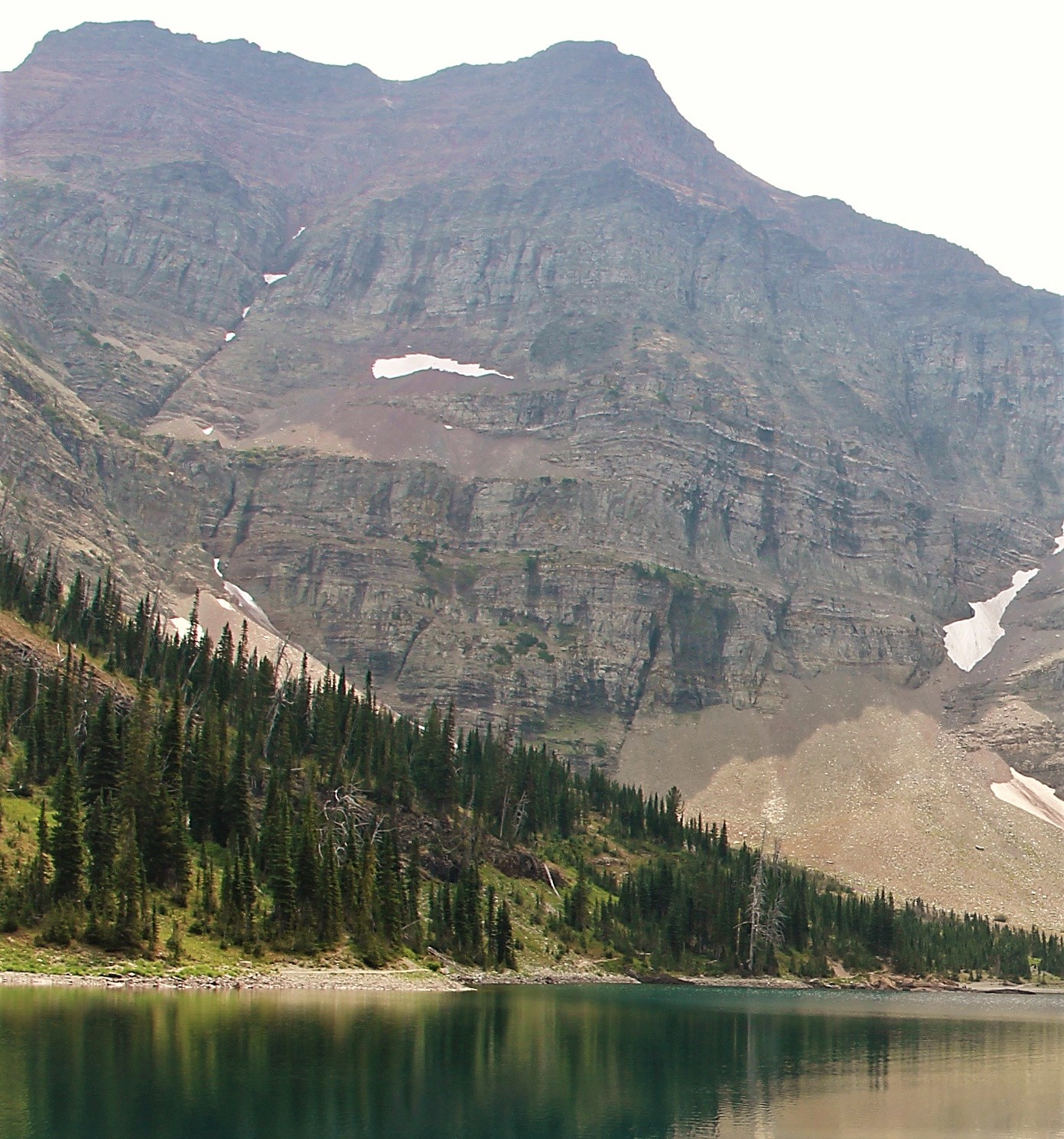
Crypt Peak above Crypt Lake

== See also ==
- List of mountains and mountain ranges of Glacier National Park (U.S.)
- Geology of the Rocky Mountains
