= List of coulees in Alberta =

The following is a list of coulees located in the province of Alberta, Canada.

== List of coulees ==
Coulee name	Nearest community	Specialized/rural municipality	Coordinates	CGNDB link (ID)
Appleyard Coulee	Hesketh	Kneehill County	51°28′20″N 113°01′43″W	IARAR
Arrowsmith Coulee	Turin	Lethbridge County	49°46′00″N 000°00′00″W	IADNK
Becker Coulee	Foremost	County of Forty Mile No. 8	49°29′30″N 111°26′15″W	IAEBK
Big Coulee	Athabasca	Athabasca County	54°52′44″N 113°17′00″W	IAGBN
Big Coulée	Lundbreck	Municipal District of Pincher Creek No. 9	49°48′22″N 114°09′41″W	IAGBO
Bish Coulee	Whiskey Gap	Cardston County	48°59′56″N 112°59′43″W	
Black Coulee	Lucky Strike	County of Warner No. 5	49°07′09″N 111°22′27″W	IAGFE
Blackfoot Coulee	Paradise Valley	County of Vermilion River	53°07′11″N 110°13′16″W	
Blacktail Coulee	Stavely	Municipal District of Ranchland No. 66	50°06′55″N 113°53′07″W	IARAY
Bond Coulee	Manyberries	County of Forty Mile No. 8	49°15′34″N 110°51′46″W	IAHBD
Boneyard Coulee	Stavely	Municipal District of Ranchland No. 66	50°09′09″N 113°47′48″W	IAQWM
Bratton Coulee	Spring Point	Municipal District of Willow Creek No. 26	49°43′17″N 113°50′37″W	IAIAN
Brush Coulee	Suffield	Cypress County	50°36′16″N 110°37′51″W	IAJIA
Bryant Coulee	Etzikom	County of Forty Mile No. 8	49°11′42″N 111°05′05″W	IAJIH
Buffalo Coulee	Mannville	County of Minburn No. 27	53°12′52″N 111°12′56″W	IAJJI
Bull Springs Coulee	Schuler	Cypress County	50°25′02″N 110°25′01″W	IAJLA
Bullhorn Coulee	Cardston	Cardston County	49°16′51″N 113°21′50″W	IAJKP
Calib Coulee	Manyberries	County of Forty Mile No. 8	49°13′52″N 110°49′28″W	IAKIE
Chandler Coulee	Claresholm	Municipal District of Ranchland No. 66	50°04′12″N 114°00′24″W	IALPN
Cherry Coulee	Bow Island	County of Forty Mile No. 8	49°54′05″N 111°27′36″W	IAMIN
Chin Coulee	Etzikom	County of Forty Mile No. 8	49°33′06″N 111°12′35″W	IAPEX
Circus Coulee	Dorothy	Special Area No. 2	51°18′08″N 112°17′36″W	IAMMC
Coal Coulee	Longview	Foothills County	50°28′56″N 114°19′16″W	IARBF
Coal Mine Coulee	Kimball	Cardston County	49°02′51″N 113°15′14″W	IAQOL
Cronkhite Coulee	Orion	County of Forty Mile No. 8	49°27′29″N 110°51′35″W	IAODX
Cross Coulee	Raymond	County of Warner No. 5	49°24′07″N 112°36′14″W	
Cut-Off Coulee	Delia	Starland County	51°34′4″N 112°19′49″W	IARFK
Davy Coulee	Shaughnessy	Lethbridge County	49°52′26″N 112°51′32″W	IAPSD
Deadhorse Coulee	Masinasin	County of Warner No. 5	49°04′59″N 111°35′49″W	
Delmas Coulee	Elkwater	Cypress County	49°32′50″N 110°16′02″W	IAQBH
Dempster Coulee	Elkwater	Cypress County	49°40′02″N 110°27′45″W	IAQCB
Dickson Coulee	Longview, Alberta	Foothills County	50°21′48″N 114°26′21″W	IABBW
Dry Coulee	Claresholm	Municipal District of Ranchland No. 66	49°59′50″N 114°02′45″W	IABPG
Dunbar Coulee	Patricia	Special Area No. 2	50°46′39″N 111°28′28″W	IARBN
Eagle Coulee	Lundbreck	Municipal District of Pincher Creek No. 9	49°50′37″N 114°13′11″W	IACBU
Easy Coulee	Suffield	Cypress County	50°31′59″N 110°48′5″W	IACDU
Erickson Coulee	Manyberries	County of Forty Mile No. 8	49°22′23″N 110°53′19″W	IACRN
Etzikom Coulee	Wrentham	County of Warner No. 5	49°28′47″N 112°8′39″W	IADBG
Expanse Coulee	Vauxhall	Municipal District of Taber	49°57′39″N 112°05′01″W	IADCP
Finn Coulee	Manyberries	County of Forty Mile No. 8	49°27′11″N 110°37′41″W	IAEQP
Forty Mile Coulee	Etzikom	County of Forty Mile No. 8	49°33′17″N 111°12′21″W	IAGQB
Fox Coulee	Whiskey Gap	Cardston County	49°00′07″N 112°59′56″W	
Frozenman Coulee	Water Valley	Mountain View County	51°30′09″N 114°43′46″W	IAFVR
Graburn County	Elkwater	Cypress County	49°38′00″N 110°01′00″W	IAHLO
Grande Coulee	Cochrane	Rocky View County	51°13′23″N 114°25′13″W	
Halifax Coulee	Pincher Creek	Municipal District of Pincher Creek No. 9	49°25′25″N 113°47′42″W	IAIMC
Hargrave Coulees	Schuler	Cypress County	50°25′40″N 110°23′56″W	
Hastings Coulee	Forestburg	Flagstaff County	52°31′00″N 112°15′00″W	IAIPV
Hillside Coulee	Claresholm	Municipal District of Ranchland No. 66	50°03′11″N 113°52′42″W	IAJWL
Hollis Coulee	Spring Point	Municipal District of Willow Creek No. 26	49°45′12″N 113°54′22″W	IAJXT
Home Coulee	Dalum	Wheatland County	51°21′00″N 112°38′18″W	IARCJ
Honey Coulee	Stavely	Municipal District of Ranchland No. 66	50°03′18″N 114°05′41″W	IAJYM
Jackknife Coulee	Lundbreck	Municipal District of Ranchland No. 66	49°56′36″N 114°17′07″W	IAMAO
Jackson Coulee	Irma	Municipal District of Wainwright No. 61	52°55′57″N 111°24′56″W	
Kennedy Coulee	Onefour	County of Forty Mile No. 8	48°59′57″N 110°35′03″W	IAQEA
Kennedy's Coulee	Bindloss	Municipal District of Acadia No. 34	50°57′04″N 110°13′10″W	IARCP
Kin Coulee	Medicine Hat	Cypress County	50°01′19″N 110°41′08″W	
Kipp Coulee	New Dayton	County of Warner No. 5	49°26′10″N 112°28′35″W	IABEU
Kohler Coulee	Stavely	Municipal District of Ranchland No. 66	50°06′46″N 113°54′37″W	IARCT
Legend Coulee	Foremost	County of Forty Mile No. 8	49°23′44″N 111°29′55″W	IADSR
Linquist Coulee	Winnifred	County of Forty Mile No. 8	49°58′44″N 111°21′48″W	IADJA
Lonesome Coulee	Cavendish	Municipal District of Acadia No. 34	50°51′54″N 110°29′33″W	IAEBM
Long Coulee	Champion	Vulcan County	50°13′18″N 112°58′13″W	IADXM
Lost Coulee	Onefour	Cypress County	49°06′02″N 110°34′58″W	
Maher Coulee	Manyberries	County of Forty Mile No. 8	49°26′22″N 110°40′50″W	IAGRZ
Mayme Coulee	Water Valley	Mountain View County	51°28′48″N 114°43′38″W	IAHVH
McConnell Coulee	Drumheller	Special Area No. 2	51°24′18″N 112°26′18″W	IAHWC
McDougall Coulee	Bergen	Mountain View County	51°41′09″N 114°32′49″W	IAHWU
McNab Coulee	Fort Macleod	Municipal District of Willow Creek No. 26	49°40′02″N 113°19′37″W	IAISS
McPherson Coulee	Airdrie	Rocky View County	51°20′43″N 114°02′43″W	IAITC
Medicine Lodge Coulee	Elkwater	Cypress County	49°34′32″N 110°22′20″W	IAIUI
Michael Coulee	Lundbreck	Municipal District of Pincher Creek No. 9	49°47′32″N 114°03′33″W	IAIWQ
Middle Coulee	Warner	County of Warner No. 5	49°20′28″N 112°22′10″W	IAIXD
Miles Coulee	Lundbreck	Municipal District of Pincher Creek No. 9	49°54′08″N 114°17′57″W	IAJZM
Mill Coulee	Claresholm	Municipal District of Ranchland No. 66	49°57′00″N 113°58′00″W	IAKAA
Minda Coulee	Manyberries	County of Forty Mile No. 8	49°25′09″N 110°43′56″W	IAKBD
Miners Coulee	Aden	County of Forty Mile No. 8	49°06′13″N 111°23′22″W	IAKBG
Minor Coulee	Claresholm	Municipal District of Ranchland No. 66	50°02′28″N 114°06′18″W	IAKCA
Nine Mile Coulee	Magrath	Cardston County	49°26′00″N 112°47′00″W	IANQC
North Easy Coulee	Suffield, Alberta	Cypress County	50°37′09″N 110°51′27″W	IAOIV
Pack Trail Coulee	Longview	Kananaskis Improvement District	50°24′13″N 114°35′07″W	IAPWN
Philp Coulee	Aden	County of Forty Mile No. 8	49°07′52″N 111°00′05″W	IABIQ
Pine Coulee	Nanton, Alberta	Municipal District of Willow Creek No. 26	50°16′05″N 113°50′06″W	IABKB
Piyami Coulee	Picture Butte	Lethbridge County	49°49′51″N 112°46′00″W	IABVR
Police Coulee	Coutts	County of Warner No. 5	48°59′52″N 111°39′56″W	
Prairie Blood Coulee	Lethbridge	Cardston County	49°33′00″N 112°56′00″W	IACAA
Prairie Coulees	Schuler	Cypress County	50°25′54″N 110°23′08″W	
Quail Coulee	Claresholm	Municipal District of Ranchland No. 66	50°01′35″N 113°57′11″W	IAQYT
Ramsay Coulee	Aden	County of Warner No. 5	49°02′48″N 111°34′30″W	IAEHB
Red Rock Coulee	Orion	County of Forty Mile No. 8	00°00′00″N 000°00′00″W	IAEKP
Reeder Coulee	Leavitt	Cardston County	49°08′18″N 113°24′33″W	IAELB
Rice's Coulee	Olds	Mountain View County	51°47′31″N 114°17′00″W	IASXU
Rocky Coulee	Monarch	Municipal District of Willow Creek No. 26	49°51′4″N 113°14′04″W	IAFNZ
Rogers Coulee	Orion	County of Forty Mile No. 8	49°26′42″N 110°50′14″W	IAFOW
Ross Coulee	Veinerville	Cypress County	50°01′49″N 110°38′21″W	IAFRC
Scotts Coulee	Glenwood	Municipal District of Willow Creek No. 26	49°25′45″N 113°31′59″W	IAHHD
Shannon Coulee	Calgary	Rocky View County	50°59′42″N 114°15′25″W	IAHKA
Sheep Coulee	Carstairs	Mountain View County	51°31′50″N 113°56′00″W	IAIDU
Six Mile Coulee	Calgary	Rocky View County	50°55′51″N 114°12′12″W	IAIIT
Smith Coulee	Lucky Strike	County of Forty Mile No. 8	49°08′44″N 111°18′28″W	IAIKN
South Easy Coulee	Suffield	Cypress County	50°35′11″N 110°52′03″W	IAJQU
Spruce Coulee	Elkwater	Cypress County	52°35′53″N 112°24′34″W	IAQPM
Squaw Coulee	Stavely	Municipal District of Ranchland No. 66	50°08′00″N 114°07′07″W	
Stornham Coulee	Seven Persons	Cypress County	49°50′50″N 110°54′49″W	IALSX
Suiste Coulee	Elkwater	Cypress County	49°26′48″N 110°20′02″W	IALVW
Tennessee Coulee				
Thirty Mile Coulee	Seven Persons	Cypress County	49°47′47″N 110°57′11″W	IAMTD
Timber Coulee	Stavely	Municipal District of Ranchland No. 66	50°10′54″N 114°05′34″W	IAMVS
Trail Coulee	Claresholm	Municipal District of Ranchland No. 66	50°02′15″N 114°02′23″W	IANUZ
Twelve Mile Coulee	Hays	County of Newell	50°08′27″N 111°40′41″W	IAOVU
Van Cleeve Coulee	Masinasin	County of Warner No. 5	49°04′37″N 111°38′53″W	IAOBH
Verdigris Coulee	Coutts	County of Warner No. 5	49°06′35″N 111°45′27″W	IAOLY
Wager Coulee	Stavely	Municipal District of Ranchland No. 66	50°01′38″N 114°01′20″W	IAOQA
White Rock Coulee	Schuler	Cypress County	50°25′50″N 110°24′11″W	IAPEA
Whitla Coulee	Whitla	County of Forty Mile No. 8	49°47′36″N 111°0′24″W	IAPEM
Williams Coulee	Nanton	Municipal District of Willow Creek No. 26	50°21′11″N 113°57′33″W	IAREG
Wilson Coulee	Okotoks	Foothills County	50°46′11″N 114°01′11″W	IAPKD
Winchell Coulee	Water Valley	Mountain View County	51°27′17″N 114°37′28″W	IAPKS
Wolf Coulee	Iddesleigh	County of Newell	50°45′14″N 111°25′32″W	IAPMY
Woltan Coulee	Orion	County of Forty Mile No. 8	49°33′40″N 110°50′33″W	IAPNK
Women's Coulee	High River	Foothills County	50°32′45″N 113°56′27″W	IBAGW
Woolf Coulee	Travers	Vulcan County	50°11′23″N 112°52′49″W	IAAAM
Wynder Coulee	Beazer	Cardston County	49°06′56″N 113°28′56″W	IAABI

== See also ==
- List of lakes in Alberta
- List of rivers of Alberta
