= Nemiscam, Alberta =

Nemiscam Nemiskam, Bingham
- Unincorporated community
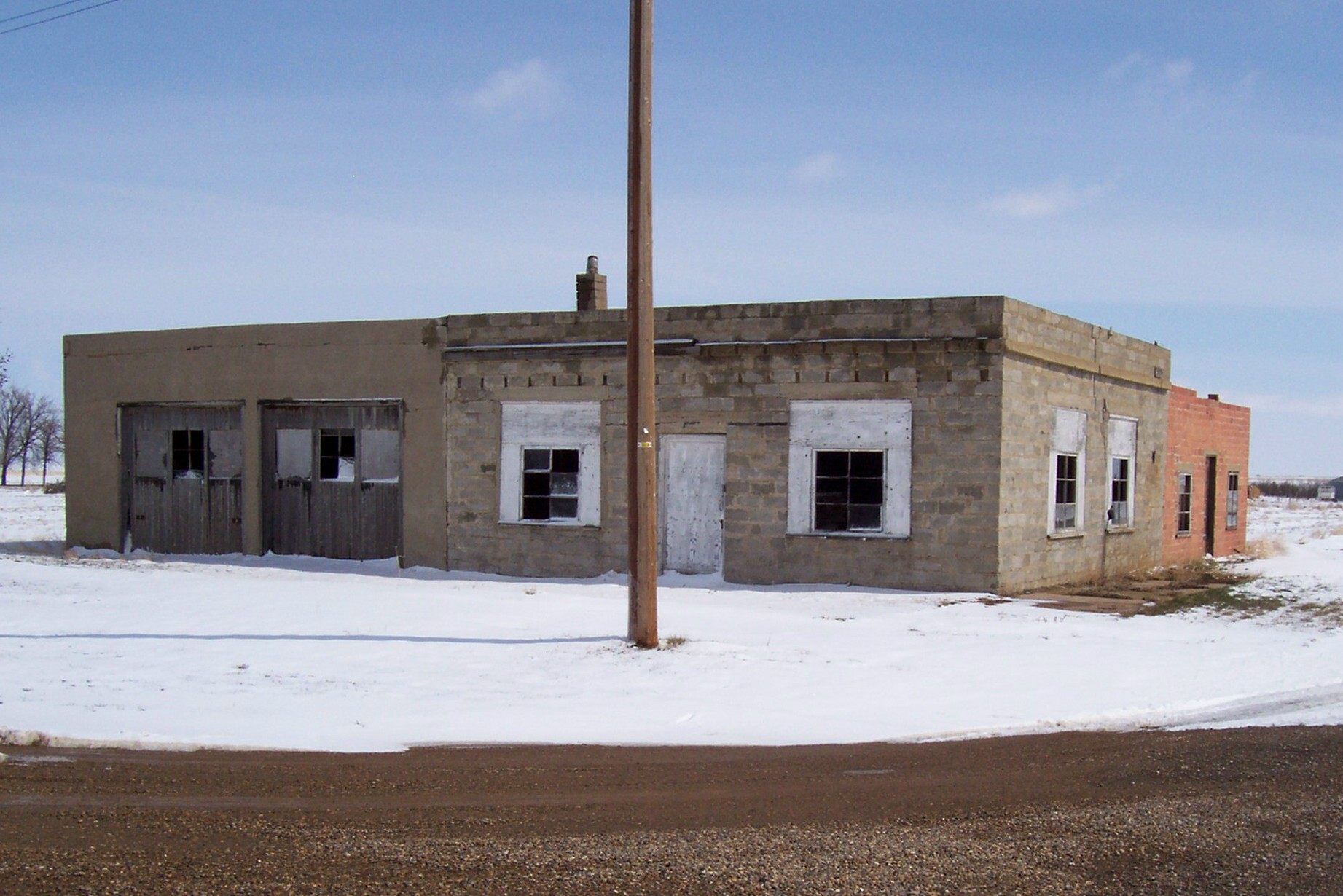
- Vacant store

- Location in County of Forty Mile Location in Alberta
- Coordinates: 49°28′48″N 111°16′34″W
- Country: Canada
- Province: Alberta
- Region: Southern Alberta
- Planning region: South Saskatchewan
- Municipal district: Forty Mile
- Founded: 1915

Government
  - MP: Glen Motz
  - MLA: Grant Hunter
- Time zone: UTC−06:00 (Alberta Time)
- Postal code span: NA
- Area code: +1-403
- Highways: Highway 61

Nemiscam (/ˈnɛmɪskæm/), also known as Nemiskam, and originally known as Bingham, is an unincorporated community within the County of Forty Mile No. 8 in southern Alberta, Canada. The community is roughly 10 km east of Foremost, west of Etzikom, Alberta, on Highway 61 and is administered by the County of Forty Mile No. 8.

The community is known as a ghost town by people in the area due to being nearly vacant with a number of abandoned buildings inside the former town. In light of this fact, the community has become a curiosity and minor tourism destination. Most visitors are from the nearby cities of Calgary, Medicine Hat and other nearby rural communities. The most prominent features of the ghost town are the sign that says "Future home of Kmart", and the abandoned Nemiskam Garage building, both located in the southern half of the ghost town along Township Road 63A.

The ghost town is 10 km east of Foremost, and 11 km west of the partially abandoned town of Etzikom. Nemiskam is near other ghost towns, including Altorado which is located 11 km south, Conquerville which is about 19 km north, and Orion which is 33 km east.

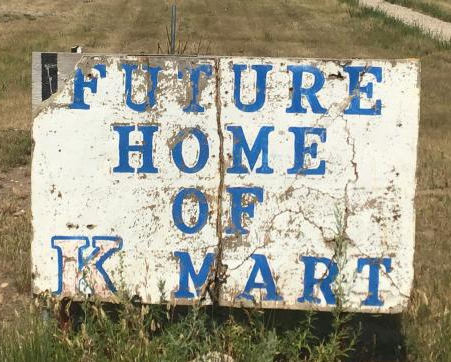
The "Future Home of Kmart" sign located inside of Nemiskam is one of the most prominent features of the ghost town.

== History ==
Originally, Nemiskam was established as a small community called "Bingham", located 1 km southwest of the current townsite. Due to a railway bypass, the citizens of Bingham decided to settle in Nemiskam, with some even bringing their homes and businesses with them. During the community's most prosperous years, a community hall, four grain elevators, a school, and a service station were present in the townsite.

About 11 km south of Nemiskam was the old community of Altorado, which by 1913 had a population of over 100. With no prospects of a long-term future in Altorado, as the Canadian Pacific Rail service extended a trainline north of Altorado to the community of Bingham (nowadays Nemiskam), many residents of Altorado relocated to Nemiskam. This eventually caused Altorado to become a ghost town similar to what Nemiskam is today.

Beginning in the 1960s, Nemiskam's population numbered 54. By 1966, the population had reduced to just 17. Today, many of the original buildings are gone, and most residents moved or relocated. Some moved to the nearest town of Foremost. In the early 1990s, Nemiskam would suffer another loss – its four grain elevators.

=== Name origin ===
For many years Nemiskam or Nemiscam has had several disputes over the different ways of spelling the community's name. People and map companies of today spell the name with a c but many older folk like to spell it with a k as it was originally spelled on the town's long-gone grain elevators and community hall. Nemiskam with a k is Blackfoot for 'between two coulées'.

== Media coverage ==
CBC News on September 10, 2020, released a mini-documentary by the title of "This Alberta ghost town has no services, but still has guests" focusing on Nemiskam. This mini-documentary covered Nemiskam and the people who come to visit the remains of the abandoned town, and stated the old school house is "the most photographed abandoned building in Alberta".

== See also ==
- Nemiskam National Park
- List of communities in Alberta
- List of ghost towns in Alberta
