= Altorado, Alberta =

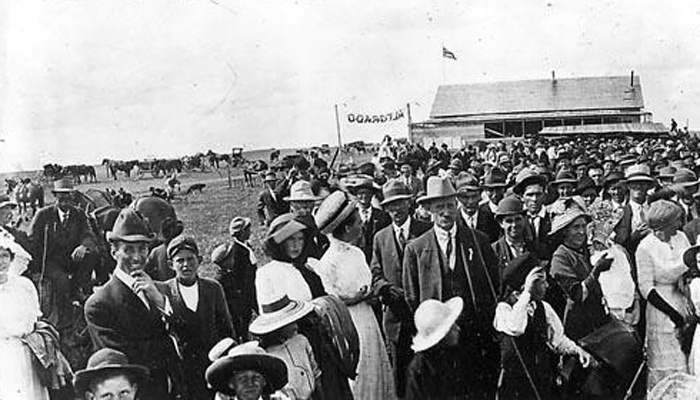
Dominion Day picnic, Altorado School. Background: a sign bearing Altorado's name; left foreground: Perren Baker.

Altorado is a ghost town in the County of Forty Mile No. 8, Alberta, Canada. It is 22 kilometres (14 mi) south-west of Etzikom.

== Toponymy ==
The name may have been selected by early settlers as a play on (or misspelling of) El Dorado. Some researchers have also proposed that its name is a combination of the words Alberta and Colorado, owing to the number of settlers from the United States represented in its founding population.

== History ==
=== Founding: 1911-1913 ===
Beginning around 1911, the Altorado Union, composed of members of the Church of Jesus Christ of Latter-day Saints, settled the area that became known as Altorado. Early settlers anticipated that the area would soon be served by the Canadian Pacific Railway, connecting Weyburn, Saskatchewan to Stirling, Alberta. Residents petitioned politician William Ashbury Buchanan to hasten the introduction of rail, only for the Canadian Pacific Railway selected another location in 1913: Foremost, Alberta, situated three miles east and six miles south of Altorado.

By this time Altorado was a village populated by around 100 people. The predominantly agricultural community was served by two general stores, three blacksmiths, a teacher, and a physician. The community contained a church, Sacred Heart, that received interments at its attached graveyard. Altorado also briefly hosted a baseball team constituted of locals that played against similar teams in nearby hamlets.

Altorado held an annual picnic at its schoolhouse, inviting residents of nearby areas to celebrate Dominion Day (now Canada Day), until the community ceased to exist. The first event, held in 1912, was attended by William Ashbury Buchanan, who slept on the floor of a resident due to the absence of a hotel in the area. Attendees participated in horse racing, baseball, and other outdoor activities.

=== Dissolution: 1914–1918 ===
After Foremost's founding, Altorado began to depopulate as residents moved closer to rail connections. The settlement was further impacted by substantial crop failures. Altorado's municipal representatives wrote to Prime Minister Robert Borden in August 1914, requesting coal, clothing, and provisions following a "complete failure of all crops" owing to drought in the area. An Altorado post office opened in 1915, only to close permanently by February 1918.

Altorado as a community ceased to exist soon after, though some agricultural operations remained active. A post office operating under the name Birdsholm, so named because it began in the homestead of the Bird family, served remaining settlers and surrounding homesteads until 1949.

== Places of interest ==
As of 2026 all that remains of Altorado is Sacred Heart Cemetery and the abandoned Sacred Heart Church. The cemetery, which remains open to the public, received interments until the late 20th century.

== In media ==
- Altorado features in the novel Napi's Dance (2012) by Alanda Greene.

== Notable residents ==
- Perren Baker – Minister of Education (Alberta) from 1921 until 1935

== See also ==
- List of ghost towns in Alberta
- Nemiskam, Alberta
- Orion, Alberta
