= Alberta Highway 61 =

Highway in Alberta, Canada

Highway 61
- Red Coat Trail
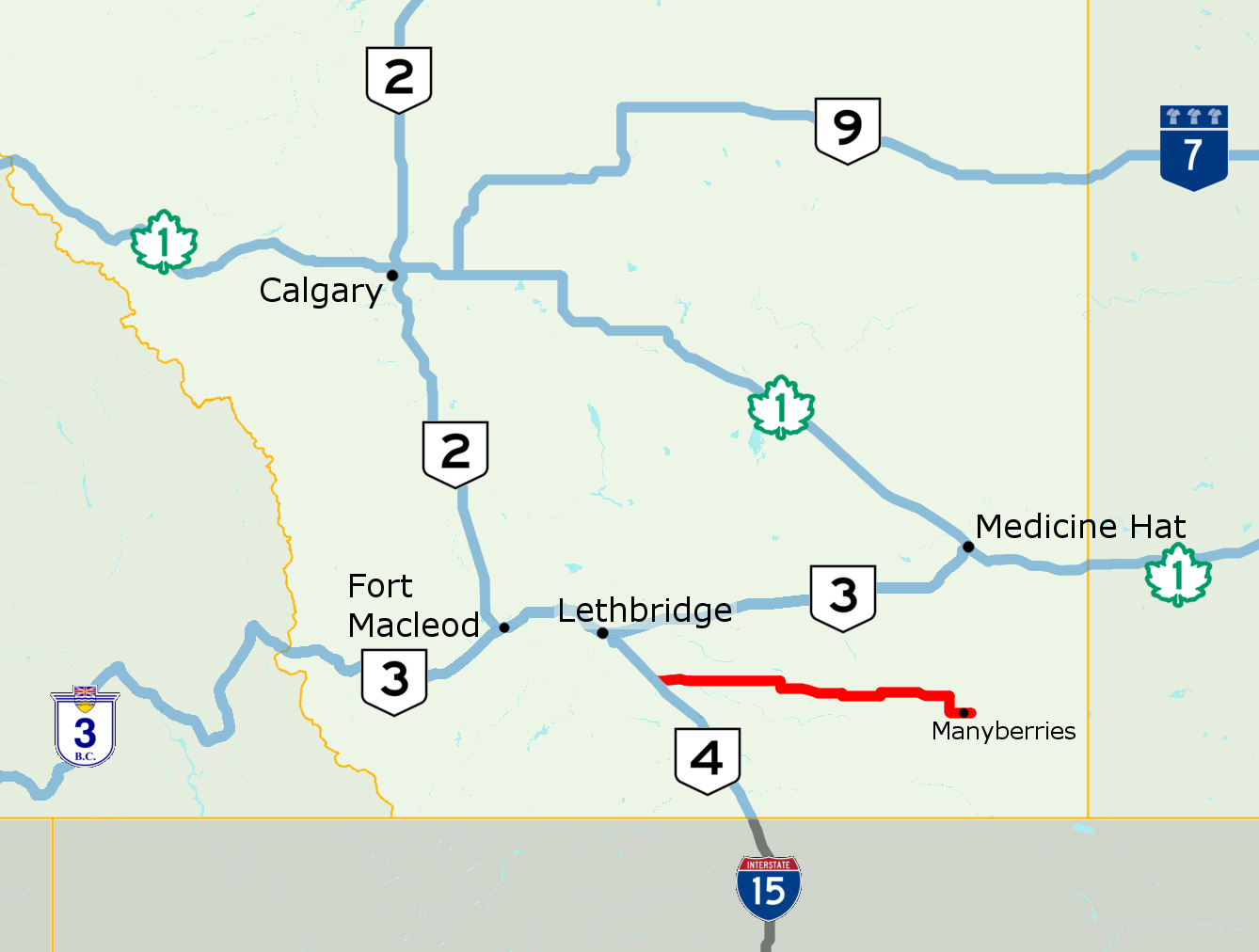
- Highway 61 highlighted in red

Route information
- Maintained by the Ministry of Transportation and Economic Corridors
- Length: 146.8 km (91.2 mi)
- Existed: 1960–present

Major junctions
- West end: Highway 4 / Highway 846 near Stirling
- Highway 36 near Wrentham
- East end: Highway 889 near Manyberries

Location
- Country: Canada
- Province: Alberta
- Specialized and rural municipalities: Warner No. 5 County, Forty Mile No. 8 County
- Villages: Foremost

Highway system
- Alberta Numbered Highway Network; List; Former
← Highway 60	→ Highway 62

Alberta Provincial Highway No. 61, commonly referred to as Highway 61, is an east–west highway in southern Alberta, Canada. In the west, Highway 61 starts at Highway 4 north of the Village of Stirling and ends at Highway 889 east of the Hamlet of Manyberries. It is part of the Red Coat Trail, a historical route north of the Canada–US border. The Red Coat Trail continues to Saskatchewan via Highway 889 and Highway 501.

== History ==
In 1959, Alberta announced $100,000 of improvements to the highway, and incorporation of it to the provincial highway system the following year. Paving was completed by 1961.

== Major intersections ==
From west to east:

Rural/specialized municipality	Location	km	mi	Destinations	Notes
County of Warner No. 5	Stirling	0.0	0.0	Highway 846 south Highway 4 – Lethbridge, Coutts	Continues as Highway 846; Red Coat Trail follows Highway 4 north
County of Warner No. 5	Wrentham	23.5	14.6	Highway 36 – Taber, Warner	
County of Forty Mile No. 8		52.2	32.4	Highway 877 north – Grassy Lake	West end of Highway 877 concurrency
County of Forty Mile No. 8	Skiff	55.2	34.3	Highway 877 south	East end of Highway 877 concurrency
County of Forty Mile No. 8	Foremost	81.1	50.4	Highway 879 north – Bow Island	West end of Highway 879 concurrency
County of Forty Mile No. 8	Foremost	82.7	51.4	Highway 879 south – Aden	East end of Highway 879 concurrency
County of Forty Mile No. 8	Etzikom	107.6	66.9	Highway 885	
County of Forty Mile No. 8	Orion	128.8– 129.1	80.0– 80.2	Highway 887 north – Seven Persons	West end of Highway 887 concurrency
County of Forty Mile No. 8		135.6– 136.0	84.3– 84.5	Highway 887 south	East end of Highway 887 concurrency
County of Forty Mile No. 8	Manyberries	146.8	91.2	Highway 889 – Medicine Hat, Highway 41	Red Coat Trail follows Highway 889 south to Highway 501
1.000 mi = 1.609 km; 1.000 km = 0.621 mi: Concurrency terminus
