= Pakowki, Alberta =

Pakowki
- Unincorporated community
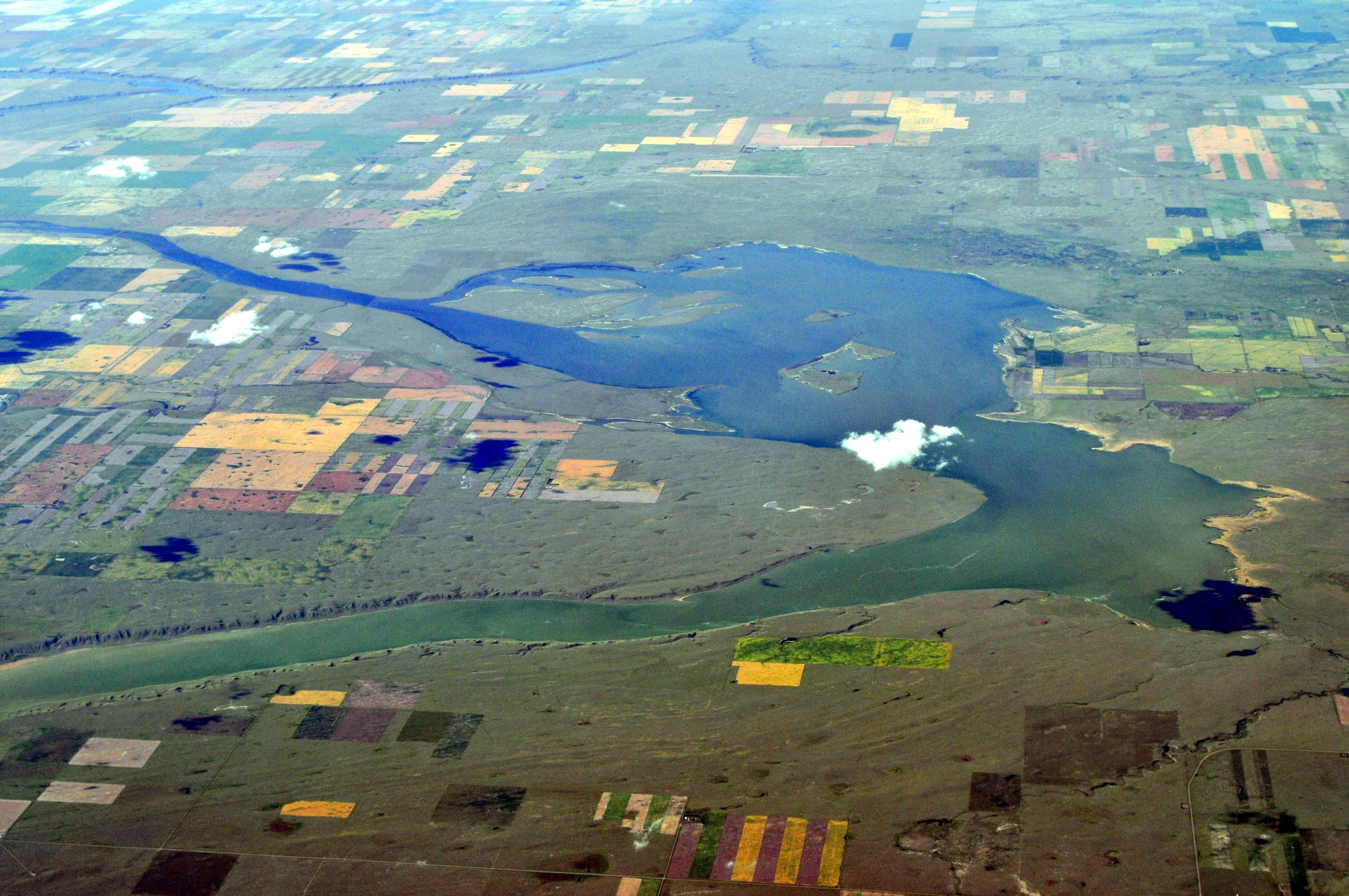
- Aerial view of Pakowki Lake about 10km south of the former town site of Pakowki.

- Location within Alberta
- Coordinates: 49°27′56″N 110°56′51″W
- Country: Canada
- Province: Alberta
- Region: Southern Alberta
- Census division: 1
- Municipal district: County of Forty Mile No. 8

Government
  - MP: Jim Hillyer
- Time zone: UTC−06:00 (Alberta Time)
- Postal code span: NA
- Area code: +1-403
- Highways: Highway 61
- Waterways: Pakowki lake

Pakowki is an abandoned unincorporated community in Alberta, Canada within the County of Forty Mile No. 8. It is located along Highway 61 in southeast Alberta.

== Toponymy ==
Pakowki's name derives from the nearby Pakowki Lake. Pakowki is a Blackfoot word meaning "bad water." The lake was so named after horses belonging to Blackfoot people in the area drowned in its waters.

Pakowki was recorded by the name Peekopee in an 1865 map produced by the Palliser expedition.

== History ==
=== Pre-settlement ===
Prehistoric artifacts from Indigenous peoples including tipi rings, arrowheads and burial cairns have been found on Pakowki Lake's shores. Members of the Kainai Nation hunted in Pakowki during the 19th century, and interacted with whiskey traders from Montana who were active in the area.

=== Pakowki: 1908–1929 ===
The Hudson's Bay Company surveyed lands including Pakowki for agricultural use between 1908 and 1911, then sold appropriate plots to homesteaders.

The area was populated enough by April 1912 that resident William Cronkhite established a post office to serve settlers in the area. The post office initially operated under the name Fourways, as it stood near the banks of Fourways Creek, which drains into Pakowki Lake.

The Canadian Pacific Railway established a siding in the area in 1915, which it named Pakowki after the lake. The post office relocated closer to the siding, and adopted the name Pakowki to match in September 1916.

In the two years after the railroad's introduction, Pakowki experienced rapid growth. Two grain elevators were established as local farms enjoyed "bumper" crop yields, followed by various stores and a hotel. Amenities included a Chinese restaurant, barbershop, and pool hall. Wilfrid Eggleston briefly worked in a general store within Pakowki. An Evangelical preacher was also assigned to the area to deliver sermons on Sundays. Historian Harold Fryer estimates that, at its peak, Pakowki had 200 residents.

However, Pakowki soon experienced dry weather and barren soil that resulted in poor crop yields for farmers. The land best suited to agriculture in the area lay to the north and east of the settlement. When the railway line reached the settlement of Orion in 1916, many of Pakowki's residents and businesses relocated there, including the hotel. By the end of 1917, few of the commercial operations that had set up around Pakowki's railway siding remained there.

Some farms remained active in Pakowki following the exodus to Orion, but drought throughout the 1920s resulted in their closure. Exploratory drilling efforts for natural gas near Pakowki that began in 1922 ended in 1926, after very little was found. Pakowki's post office closed in December 1929, owing to the settlement's population decline. Its train tracks were removed by the 1970s. Nothing remains of the original Pakowki settlement, and as of 2025, the site remains uninhabited.

== Legacy ==
Pakowki has attracted occasional historical and tourist interest due to its status as an abandoned settlement, particularly for its role in the history of neighbouring hamlet Orion.

Established in 1915, Pakowki Cemetery remains active in the 21st century, receiving interments in the 2000s and 2010s.

== See also ==
- List of communities in Alberta
- List of ghost towns in Alberta
