= Whitla =

Whitla may refer to:

- Whitla, Alberta, Canada, an unincorporated community near Medicine Hat
- William Whitla (1851–1933), Irish physician and politician
