= Winnifred, Alberta =

Winnifred
- Hamlet
- Location of Winnifred in County of Forty Mile No. 8 Winnifred (Alberta)
- Coordinates: 49°54′16″N 111°12′36″W
- Country: Canada
- Province: Alberta
- Region: Southern Alberta
- Census division: No. 1
- Municipal district: County of Forty Mile No. 8
- First building: 1903
- Settled: 1908
- Hamlet: June 3, 2024

Government
  - Type: Unincorporated
- Time zone: UTC−06:00 (Alberta Time)
- Area code: +1-403

Winnifred is a hamlet in Alberta, Canada that is under the jurisdiction of the County of Forty Mile No. 8. It is approximately 50 km (31 mi) southwest of the City of Medicine Hat and 14 km (8.7 mi) east of the Town of Bow Island.

== History ==
Winnifred, originally a whistle stop at Mile 31 on the Dunmore Junction, also known as the Turkey Track, was upgraded to a siding in 1885 named after a daughter of J.R. Whitlaw, one of the charter members of the Turkey Track.

In 1903 the only buildings were the section house where William Savage lived, a dugout for the section hands, and a small two room building that housed the telegraph office. No more than ten people lived in the surroundings.

Four years later in 1907 the Alberta Government opened up the district between Grassy Lake and Winnifred for homesteading.

Settlers from Eastern Canada and the mid-western states flooded the area, taking up almost every quarter section of land for miles, unaware of the drought-ridden nature of the region. With lack of water and wood, settlers relied on wells for water and small coal deposits in the area for heating.

The first few businesses in Winnifred came in 1908 and the spring of 1909. P.J. Demarce opened a store on the south side of the tracks; William Hickmore imported lumber from Lethbridge for a hotel and eating house; and J.S Fisher, of Whitefish, Montana, opened the Fisher Mercantile.

In 1913, most of the businesses expanded and moved across the tracks, where they joined F.W. Brown's Hardware and Quong Chon's combination laundry and café. The Fritz Sick brewery of Lethbridge built an up-to-date hotel. The site of the Union Bank was diagonally across from the Fisher Mercantile building.

The boom years for Winnifred were 1915-1916, when heavy rains produced bumper crops. It was too good to be true, as in 1918 the Fisher Mercantile went bankrupt and the first of many homesteaders started moving away. The hotel went the same year and was moved to Brooks. The newspaper The Winnifred Record, which started out so bravely to chronicle the development of the community, folded shortly after.

The 1920s were harsh years for the remaining settlers, with drought, clouds of grasshoppers and finally hordes of rabbits who ate everything that looked like grain. More settlers packed up and left, and with the help of the government moved to homesteads in central and Northern Alberta.

By the mid-1930s, dust storms completed the task and farm after farm was abandoned. It took thirty years for the determined homesteaders to appreciated that without irrigation the land was best suited for ranching.

Modernizations completed the process of decline as the consolidation of schools and re-routing Highway 3 drew even more of the population off to larger centres such as Lethbridge and Medicine Hat. The few remaining business such as the Turtle Café, operated by Wing Chong, closed in the early 60s, and Winnifred became a ghost town except for the grain elevators and their operators. Eventually they too ceased to exist and were torn down. Very little of Winnifred's rich history remains, just memories and photos.

Today young families are moving back into Winnifred, in a sense repopulating the town once again.

== See also ==
- List of communities in Alberta
- List of hamlets in Alberta
