= Etzikom =

Etzikom "Valley"
- Hamlet
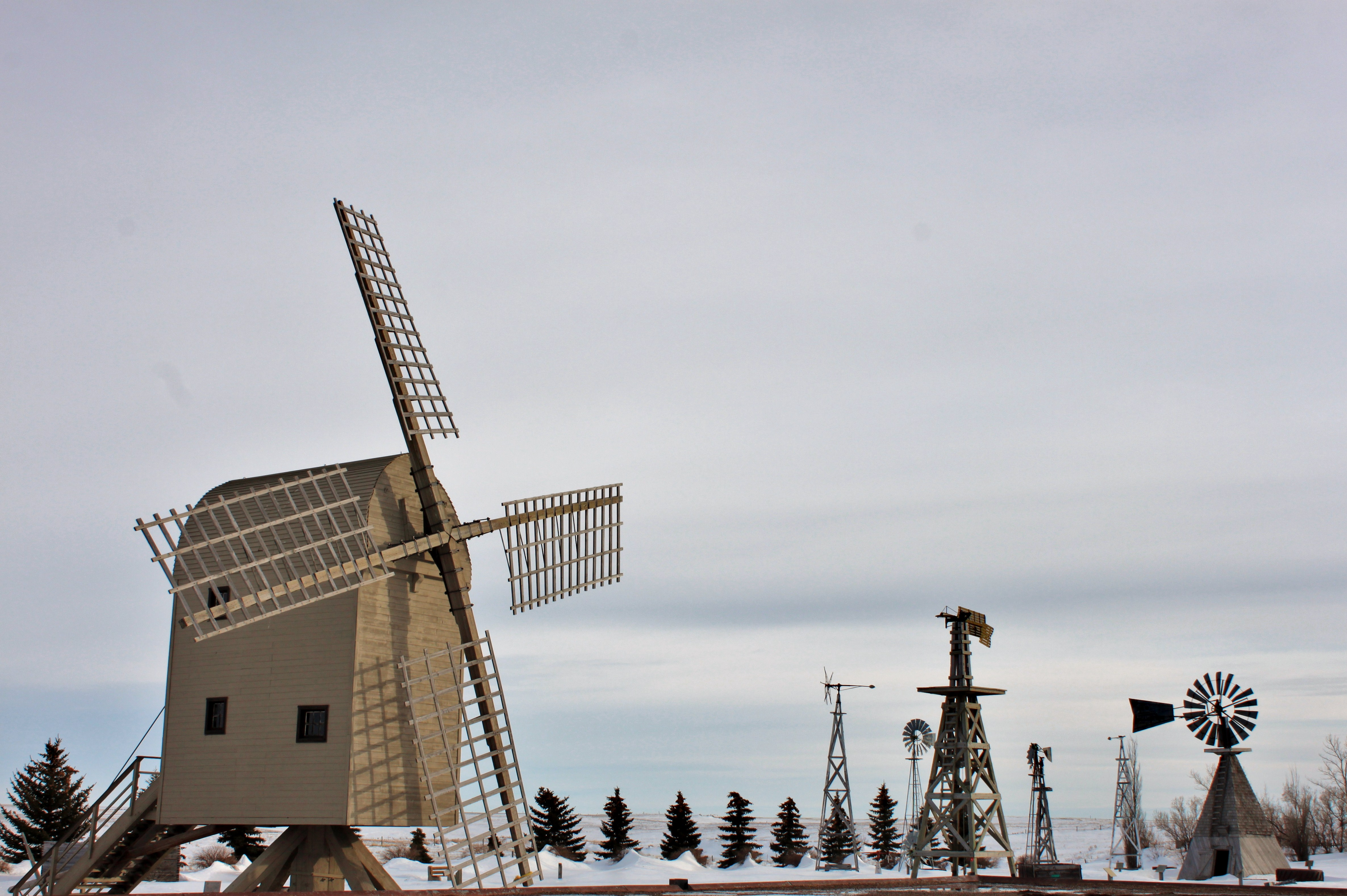
- Windmill Museum in Etzikom

- Location of Etzikom in Alberta
- Coordinates: 49.4769°N 111.1072°W
- Country: Canada
- Province: Alberta
- Region: Southern Alberta
- Census division: 1
- Municipal district: County of Forty Mile No. 8

Government
  - Type: Unincorporated
  - Governing body: County of Forty Mile No. 8 Council

Population (1991)
  - Total: 54
- Time zone: UTC−06:00 (Alberta Time)
- Postal code span: T0K 0W0
- Area code: +1-403
- Highways: Highway 61
- Waterways: Pakowki Lake

Etzikom is a hamlet in Alberta, Canada within the County of Forty Mile No. 8. It is approximately 20 kilometres (12 mi) east of Foremost on Highway 61.

== Toponymy ==
Etzikom is named for a nearby coulee. The valley itself, Etzikom Coulee, derives its name from the Blackfoot word isstsikomm, meaning coulee or ravine.

== Topography ==
Etzikom is located south of the landlocked Pakowki Lake. Depending on the volume of precipitation the lake experiences at any given time of the year, its water level can vary significantly.

=== Flora and fauna ===
Significant flora identified around Etzikom include the threatened Western Spiderwort and vulnerable Smooth Goosefoot of the Chenopodium family.

Fauna known to inhabit the grasslands around Etzikom include pronghorn populations, as well as herds of mule and white-tailed deer. Populations of chestnut-collared longspurs and cinnamon teals live in the wetlands around Etzikom. Waterfowl known to inhabit Etzikom and Pakowki, particularly during spring and fall, include the white-faced ibis, black-crowned night-heron, and American bittern. Virginia rails and snowy egrets, which are rarer birds in Alberta, are also known to inhabit Etzikom.

== History ==
=== Pre-settlement ===
Etzikom is 56 kilometres west of the Fletcher Paleo-Indian Site, where plant matter from the Holocene era was found to be preserved in lake beds. Artifacts and bones dating to around the 5th millennium BC were also discovered at the site.

Around 150 tipi rings, built by Indigenous groups during North American prehistory, were discovered in sand dunes directly south of Etzikom, as well as stone cairns believed to mark the graves of Indigenous leaders. Some artifacts found near Etzikom were identified as hunting tools, including arrowheads, used by Crow and Blackfoot groups.

=== Settlement and growth: 1909-1917 ===
The first settlers arrived in Etzikom in 1909, which was initially known to settlers as Endon. A post office began operating in the area under the name Endon in 1911, run by W.R. Shields from his general store. (Some sources report the settlement was initially called Etzikom until the Post Office Department arbitrarily changed it to the more "suitable" name of Endon, but this chain of events is not reflected in postal records or local histories accessed by Alberta Culture.)

In 1914, the Canadian Pacific Railway (CPR) introduced a railway station nearby under the name Etzikom. This was one of a series of stops established by the CPR with sixteen kilometres between them, as the CPR believed this distance would afford each townsite a chance to grow. The Etzikom Historical Society considers this year to be the founding of Etzikom as a community.

Etzikom's early economy primarily relied on grain farming and cattle ranching, and farmers relied upon windmills to grind grain and pump water. Construction began on four grain elevators in 1915. In the years following the CPR's introduction, the hamlet also received a hotel, eateries, a blacksmith, and a branch of the Union Bank of Canada (later the Royal Bank of Canada). By this time, the Endon postmaster was George Young. He relocated his businesses to the railway siding, and the Endon post office changed its name to Etzikom in February 1916. Several local schools relocated to Etzikom in 1917, becoming Etzikom Consolidated School. In this decade, Etzikom had a peak 300 residents.

Nonetheless, early development was still hampered by the effects of the area's characteristic aridity that would influence Etzikom's eventual decline. The hamlet's first medical practice had to be rebuilt after a rare prairie cyclone destroyed its building in the fall of 1915. In April 1916, a fire broke out in a department store that damaged the hamlet's billiard room and destroyed its municipal records.

=== Decline: 1918-1949 ===
Etzikom was impacted by the Spanish Flu pandemic of 1918, and its hotel became a temporary hospital. After several residents died from the disease, others chose to leave the area. Successive years of drought and dust storms following the First World War, stretching into the 1920s, further depopulated Etzikom by driving farmers away in search of more predictable conditions.

In 1924, Lethbridge Herald reporter Harold Long drove hundreds of miles through southern Alberta, reviewing the status of towns there. Long observed that towns along the "eastern fringes of Lethbridge... from Etzikom to Burdett" had more abandoned farms than any other part of his journey. According to journalist Johnnie Bachusky, some Etzikom locals were so destitute during this period that they "gave up their children for adoption, believing... just about anybody could give their young ones a better life than they could."

St. Gabriel's Catholic Church began operating in Etzikom in the late 1920s, with mass delivered by a priest who also served neighbouring districts including Foremost. Successive priests who took up this role lived in the Etzikom Hotel from 1927 until the 1950s. After the original church building was destroyed by a severe windstorm in the early 1940s, Etzikom's Catholic parish purchased a disused school building from the nearby settlement of Doondale for $1 in June 1946, and repurposed it into a new church.

=== Historic interest: 1950-1999 ===
Etzikom received electricity in the 1950s, which improved economic conditions for residents. An Evangelical Free Church opened in 1957 with a congregation of 22.

Nonetheless, after the 1965 introduction of Highway 61, residents of nearby settlements slowly began to reduce their reliance on Etzikom's commercial services, as they were able to travel to larger settlements. Etzikom has experienced ongoing population decline since. In his 1978 guide to the American West and Canadian border towns, William Carter described Etzikom as a ghost town. Nonetheless, the Government of Alberta accepted Etzikom as a settlement for provincial mapping purposes in August 1979.

Etzikom's Royal Bank of Canada branch closed in the early 1970s, and its school closed in 1985. The disused schoolhouse was vacant for two years before the Etzikom Recreation Club purchased it in 1987. In 1988, the building was donated to a new historical society, and underwent renovations in preparation for the opening of a museum. In 1989, to mark the hamlet's 75th anniversary, the Etzikom Historical Society began compiling a history of the locality. Etzikom Museum and Historic Windmill Centre opened in 1990.

=== Recent development: 2000-present ===
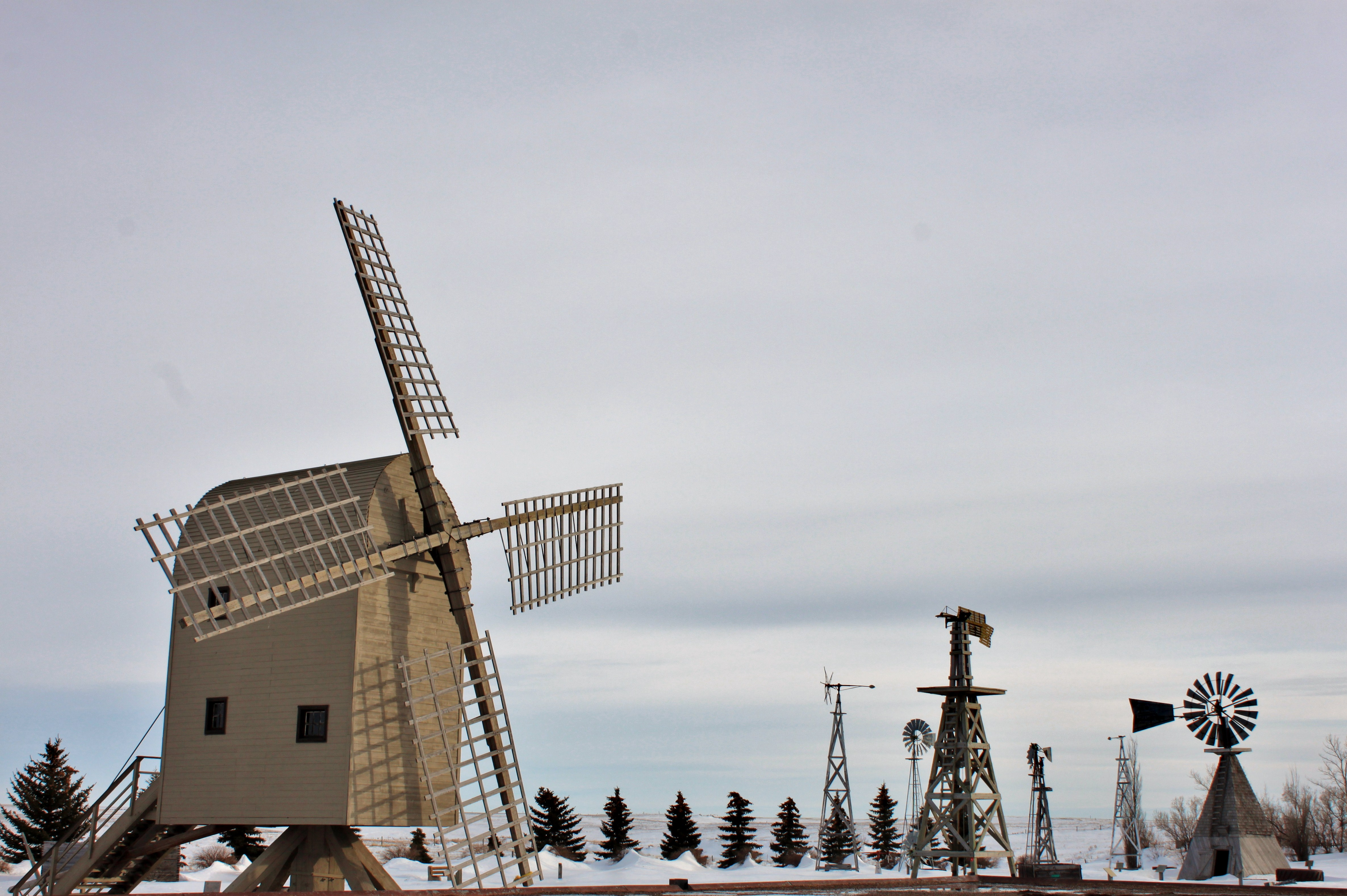
A windmill at Etzikom Museum, photographed in 2017.

St. Gabriel's Church held its last service in December 2000, owing to dwindling attendance numbers. Attempts to preserve the church as a historic site were unsuccessful, and the building has stood abandoned since.

As of 2015, many of the buildings that contained Etzikom's businesses in earlier decades remain standing, but abandoned. Abandoned residential properties occupy the hamlet as well, generating tourist interest in Etzikom as a ghost town. Visiting in 2015, Catherine Annau observed that Etzikom contained no local businesses, and residents had to "drive miles for basic groceries."

In 2017, Etzikom's general store and post office burned down. When Canada Post was unable to find a replacement postmaster, mail service transferred to nearby Orion.

== Places of interest ==
=== Historic sites ===
As of 2026, Etzikom Museum and Historic Windmill Centre opens between mid-May and September every year. Along with preserved historic buildings and artefacts from Etzikom's settler past, the site contains over 150 windmills.

Etzikom Cemetery, which began operations in 1917, also remains accessible.

== Demographics ==
Population history of Etzikom
Year	Pop.	±%
1941	94	—
1951	89	−5.3%
1956	113	+27.0%
1961	101	−10.6%
1966	93	−7.9%
1971	92	−1.1%
1976	69	−25.0%
1981	69	+0.0%
1986	68	−1.4%
1991	54	−20.6%
Source: Statistics Canada

=== Official counts ===
Etzikom recorded a population of 54 in the 1991 census conducted by Statistics Canada.

=== Reported population ===
In June 2010, the Toronto Star reported that Etzikom had a population of 29. The Cape Breton Post reported that Etzikom's population stood at 27 in July 2011.

== See also ==
- List of communities in Alberta
- List of hamlets in Alberta
