= Skiff, Alberta =

Skiff
- Hamlet
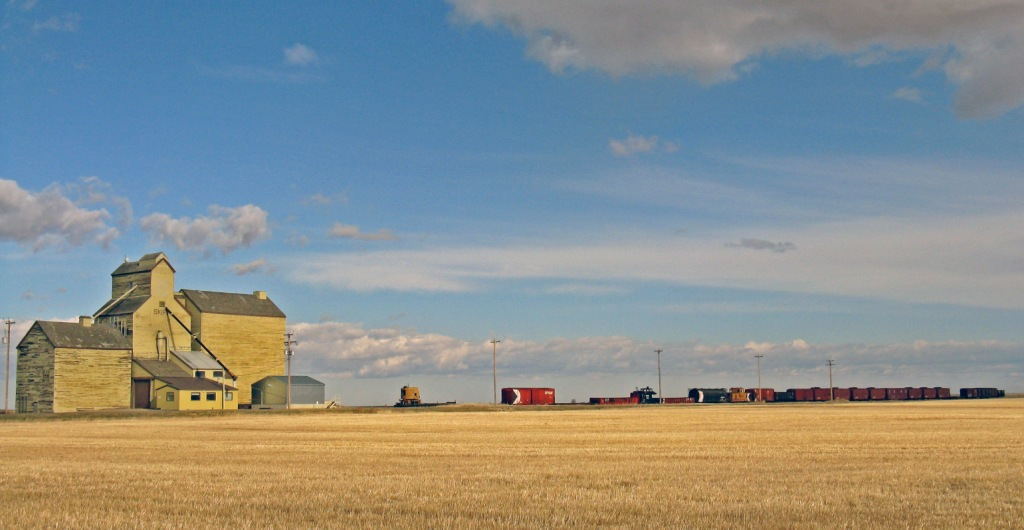

- Location of Skiff in Alberta
- Coordinates: 49°30′09″N 111°47′28″W
- Country: Canada
- Province: Alberta
- Region: Southern Alberta
- Census division: 1
- Municipal district: County of Forty Mile No. 8

Government
  - Governing body: County of Forty Mile No. 8 Council
- Elevation: 946 m (3,104 ft)

Population (1991)
  - Total: 10
- Time zone: UTC−06:00 (Alberta Time)
- Postal code span: T0K 2B0
- Area code: +1-403
- Highways: Highway 61

Skiff is a hamlet in southern Alberta, Canada within the County of Forty Mile No. 8. It is located on Highway 61, also known as the historic Red Coat Trail, approximately 75 km (47 mi) southeast of Lethbridge. It is also 40 to 45 km north of the Montana, US border.

== Demographics ==
Skiff recorded a population of 10 in the 1991 Census of Population conducted by Statistics Canada.

== Notable people ==
- Earl W. Bascom (1906-1995), rodeo pioneer, inventor, "Father of Modern Rodeo," cowboy artist and sculptor, Hollywood actor, hall of fame inductee, worked on the Hat L Ranch near Skiff

== Skiff Meteorite ==
Skiff farmer Bill Nemeth found a meteorite in the ground on his farm (NE1/4-31-3-4-W4) in 1966. 12 years later, he sold it to the University of Alberta Geology department. The exact date of its impact is currently unknown, but evidence suggests it was not very old, geologically speaking.

== See also ==
- List of communities in Alberta
- List of hamlets in Alberta
