= Whitla, Alberta =

Whitla
- Hamlet
- Location of Whitla in County of Forty Mile No. 8 Whitla (Alberta)
- Coordinates: 49.880443°N 111.058108°W
- Country: Canada
- Province: Alberta
- Region: Southern Alberta
- Census division: No. 1
- Municipal district: County of Forty Mile No. 8

Government
  - Type: Unincorporated
  - Reeve: Steven Wikkerink
  - Governing body: County of Forty Mile Council
- Elevation: 791 m (2,595 ft)
- Time zone: UTC−06:00 (Alberta Time)

Whitla is a hamlet in Alberta, Canada that is under the jurisdiction of the County of Forty Mile No. 8. It is approximately 32 km (20 mi) southwest of the City of Medicine Hat and 1.6 km (0.99 mi) north of Highway 3. As of completion of an expansion in December 2021, Capital Power Corporation operates Alberta's largest wind farm in the area, with 353MW capacity.

== History ==
Like most towns in the surrounding region, Whitla's beginnings started with the opening of homestead land in 1908, but there had been some activity before that. Named after R.J. Whitla, a Winnipeg merchant, who visited the site while it was a mere siding in 1885, squatters and cattle ranchers had taken up land in the vicinity as early as 1884. At that time, Medicine Hat was the trading center, but with the construction of the Turkey Track railway, a sensible community grew up around the village of Seven Persons.

Hundreds of settlers from North Dakota poured into the district in 1909, Lured by blatantly false promises from real estate agents, government officials and advertising brochures. They brought their customs with them; they celebrated the Fourth of July, rather than the First; They introduced oxen into the short-grass area.

The first merchant to settle at Whitla was Sam Richardson, who moved there in 1909. Before him, the town had consisted merely of a siding, a section house and the inevitable dugout for the track workers. Richardson built a store with lumber shipped in from Medicine Hat, and behind it a one-roomed shack for his family.

That following year, Alex and Chris Ashton opened another general store - this time on the north side of the tracks - and their firm was quickly followed by a hardware, a lumber yard and a farm machinery firm. Though the Aston store burned in January, 1916, the town continued to grow rapidly, with a Union Bank, two cafes, a billiard hall and three garages.

The settlers and residents of Whitla fared no better or worse than their neighbors at Winnifred. By 1924, the Alberta Government had a standing offer to relocate any homesteader who wished to leave. Many accepted the assistance. In 1927-28 (twelve years after the first bumper crops) there were two magnificent harvests and Whitla boomed. However, for the next twelve years there was only misery.

The Dirty Thirties Brought dry years, crop failures, grasshoppers hordes of voracious rabbits and dust storms. In Tribute to Whitla Pioneers, Carl Larson recalls a dust storm so severe that people could see grasshoppers digging holes four feet above ground.

A gradual exodus beginning as early as 1920, it was sped up during the 1930s and early 40s. By the end of World War II, the small homesteads had virtually vanished, giving way to huge farms and ranches. The paving and relocation of Highway 3 in 1949, as in other areas where modern highways bypass towns, was the final blow to the economy of the village.

The mid-1950s brought promise of improvement, first with the introduction of electricity in 1955 and the beginning of irrigation from the St. Mary River Project in the following year.

The local dam, located north of Whitla, was appropriately named Rattlesnake Dam. Unfortunately, irrigation had arrived 40 years too late.

The 1960s saw the gradual disintegration of Whitla and the closing of the school in 1964 was the last signal of defeat. For a short time after the towns grain elevators remained in operation until their destruction in the mid-1990s.

== See also ==
- List of communities in Alberta
- List of ghost towns in Alberta
- List of hamlets in Alberta
