= Manyberries =

- Hamlet
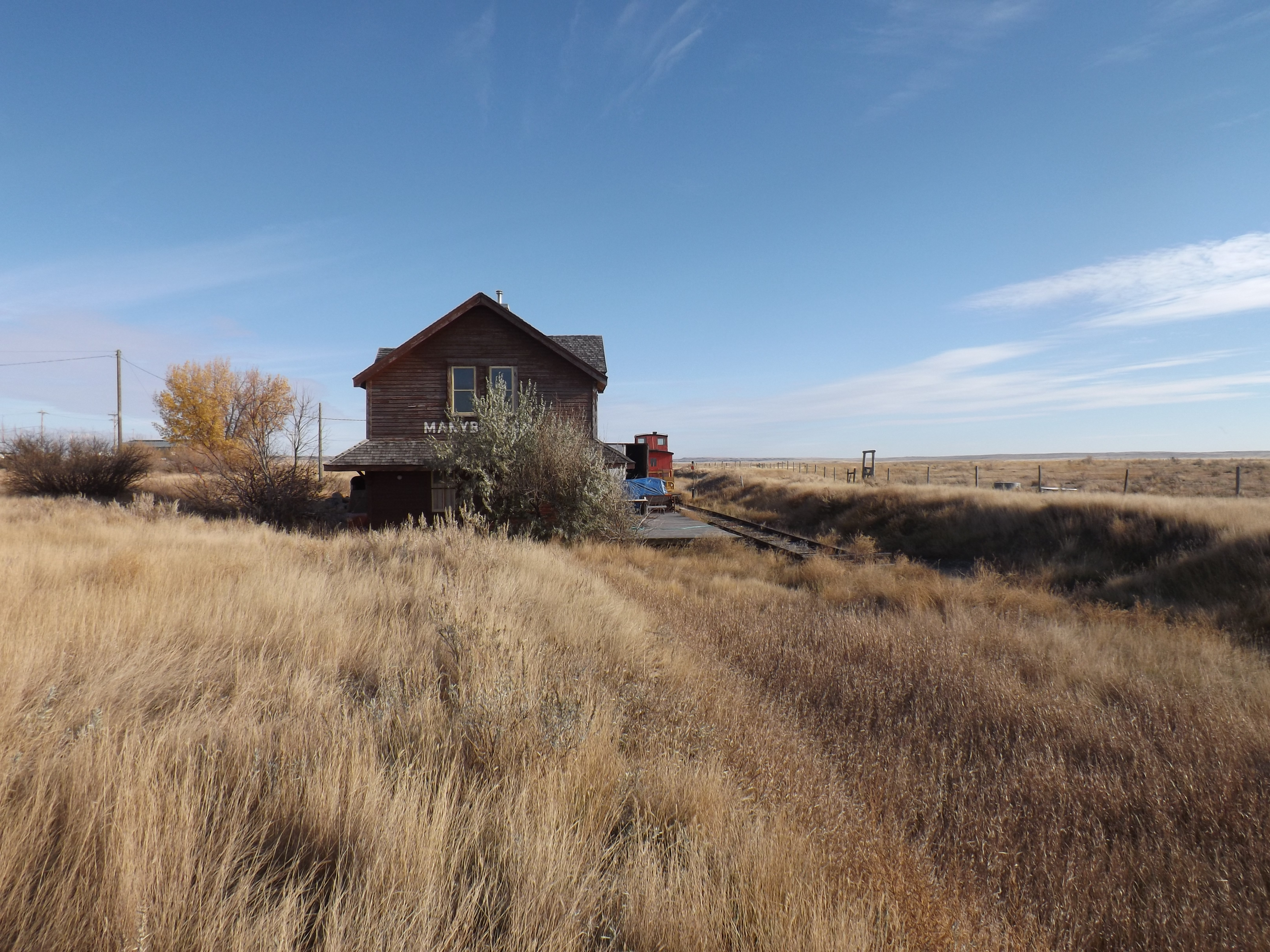
- Former railroad station

- Location within Alberta
- Coordinates: 49°24′06″N 110°41′38″W
- Country: Canada
- Province: Alberta
- Region: Southern Alberta
- Census division: 2
- Municipal district: County of Forty Mile No. 8
- Elevation: 930 m (3,050 ft)

Population (1991)
  - Total: 96
- Time zone: UTC– 06:00 (Alberta Time)
- Postal code span: T0K 1L0
- Area code: +1-403
- Highways: Highway 61
- Waterways: Pakowki Lake, Manyberries Creek

Manyberries is a hamlet in Alberta, Canada within the County of Forty Mile No. 8. It is located approximately 85 km (53 mi) south of Medicine Hat, at the eastern end of Highway 61 (the Red Coat Trail).

== Toponymy ==
Manyberries is named for the nearby Manyberries Creek, itself styled after the creek's name in the Blackfoot language. Blackfoot people local to the area referred to the stream as akoniskway ("many berries") for the abundance of berries that grow there. Most of Manyberries' streets are also named after berry species, such as Strawberry Avenue and Blueberry Street.

== History ==
=== Pre-settlement ===
Indigenous groups sourced berries from the area before European contact, including saskatoons and choke cherries. These fruits were used as pemmican ingredients. Manyberries was frequented for this purpose by members of the Blackfoot Confederacy, in particular the Piikani Nation.

A 1965 excavation identified a cairn and stone circle in Manyberries, dated to around the 3rd century, that was originally believed to be the remnants of a medicine wheel built by Indigenous peoples. It was also posited to be a burial site due to phalanx bones found between rocks, and the presence of a pit containing human remains.

A later examination by soil scientist John Dormaar advanced that the Manyberries Cairn instead resembled sites used for vision quest rituals. He suggested the bones found there had been the result of self-sacrifices by participants, as some groups believed this practice would help induce visions. Dormaar further posited the area was likely used for spiritual purposes by Piegan Blackfeet groups.

=== Settlement and early development: 1883–1915 ===
Manyberries Creek was recognized by its English-language name as early as 1883, in maps produced by the Dominion Lands Survey. Ranches operated near the creek as early as 1892, but no town developed in the area until 1909, when the Government of Alberta began to sell plots for agricultural use.

By 1911, a settlement stood in the area today known as Manyberries. A post office launched operations in February of that year under the name Manyberries, derived from the nearby creek, as did a school. In Manyberries' early years, the townsite contained services including a general store, blacksmith, and hotel. However, poor crop yields in the early 1910s drove farmers away from the area, and by 1914, Manyberries was nearly deserted.

=== Railway and Dust Bowl years: 1916–1939 ===
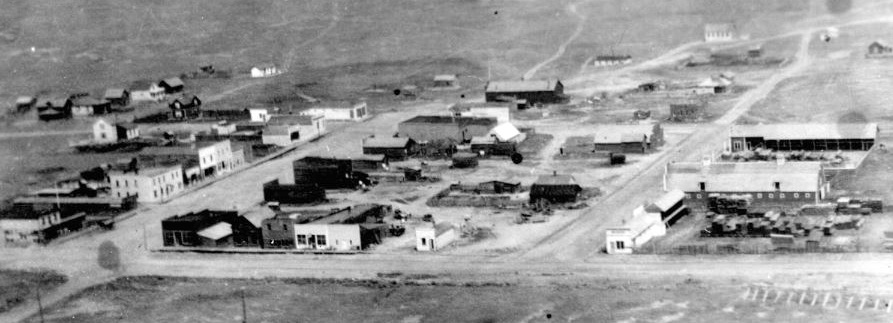
Aerial view Manyberries, photographed August 1, 1920.

The Canadian Pacific Railway (CPR) established a divisional point in Manyberries in 1916, directly after building through the nearby locality of Orion. The arrival of the railway revitalized the town, which grew to accommodate 400 residents by 1918. Five grain elevators were built in Manyberries shortly after the establishment of its train station, and a young Wilfrid Eggleston briefly worked in one of Manyberries' stores. A community association was founded to coordinate social events for the town, such as dances.

However, farms in the area were plagued by grasshopper and rabbit infestations that damaged their crop yields in the 1920s. Manyberries' population halved to 200 residents by 1921, and by 1927, only one grain elevator remained operational. Manyberries enjoyed a brief reversal of its declining crop yields between 1928 and 1931; another grain elevator was installed during the period. Nonetheless, successive droughts throughout the Dust Bowl years ended Manyberries' growth, although the hamlet was recognized as a locality by the Government of Canada in 1939.

=== Later 20th century: 1940–1999 ===
In 1949, the federal government established a station in Manyberries to experiment with cross-breeding cattle and buffalo. The 'cattalo' project continued into the 1950s. The decade also saw the end of passenger rail services to Manyberries, though freight services continued.

The Manyberries School absorbed students from nearby hamlets as their schools closed due to low enrolment numbers. A new schoolhouse was constructed in 1956, followed by expansions in 1959 and 1968. In the fall of 1954, the federal government assessed Manyberries to be one of the "driest" places surveyed for precipitation in Canada, alongside Summerland.

By 1970, only one grain elevator remained active in Manyberries. The Manyberries Historical Society formed in the 1970s to compile and preserve the hamlet's history. The society hosted a homecoming event for early settlers in 1979, then published a local history, Manyberries Chinook, in 1985. Around the mid-1980s, the hamlet began to host an annual Manyberries Rodeo, which went on hiatus in 2000.

CPR services ended to Manyberries by 1983, and the railroad was removed in the 1990s. The Manyberries Railway Station was converted into a residential dwelling and bed and breakfast until around 2014, when it became solely private property.

==== The Manyberries Sasquatch ====
Manyberries attracted national media attention in December 1977, after Manyberries' railway agent, Vern Dunlop, discovered "gargantuan footprints" in the snow near the station house on December 1. Dunlop counted 10 "clearly defined prints" that were 47 centimetres long and 20.3 centimetres wide, with an imprint of five toes. Fearing the unusual tracks would unsettle their neighbours, Dunlop told only his wife, Thelma, of his discovery. Even so, other Manyberries locals eventually saw the tracks, and some believed they were the product of a sasquatch. Several residents claimed their dogs had barked excessively the night before the discovery.

By December 2, media outlets including the Calgary Herald and Waterloo Region Record were reporting on the finding, and an RCMP Constable, Bruce Best, had investigated the scene. Best described it as "the weirdest thing [he had] ever encountered," though he declined to comment when asked if he agreed the prints were those of a mythical creature. Media interest in the story persisted throughout December.

Thelma Dunlop expressed certainty that the prints had been left by Bigfoot, but in a follow-up interview in 1983, Vern Dunlop was undecided. The Southern Ranchmen's Inn in Manyberries began serving a "giant" burger named the Sasquatch in honour of the event.

=== 21st century: 2000–present ===
Manyberries School closed in June 2009, following a decline in student enrolment numbers throughout the decade. Prior to voting upon its closure, the Prairie Rose School Division heard that some grades had just one student.

In 2016, Manyberries and the neighbouring locality of Orion celebrated their joint centennial. The Manyberries Community Association revived the Manyberries Rodeo in 2025, hosting live music and pancake breakfasts to accompany the exhibition. Organizers described attendance as having "greatly" exceeded expectations.

==== Paleontological discoveries ====
In 2001, University of Calgary graduate student Michael Ryan was camping in Manyberries when he discovered a fossil that proved to be an undiscovered species of dinosaur, the Albertaceratops. The land's owner, rancher Cecil Nesmo, aided Ryan in conducting further investigations; Ryan subsequently gave the dinosaur the specific name of Albertaceratops nesmoi in Nesmo's honour. Further paleontological discoveries were made in Manyberries in 2017, when palaeontologists from the Royal Ontario Museum extracted one of the most intact Euoplocephalus skulls discovered in southern Alberta.

== Geography ==
=== Climate ===
Manyberries experiences a semi-arid climate (Köppen climate classification BSk). Winters are long, cold and dry, while summers are relatively short but very warm. Precipitation is low, with an annual average of 353 mm, and is concentrated in the warmer months. Manyberries is the sunniest spot in Canada, receiving an average of 2,567 hours of sunshine per year.

Climate data for Manyberries (Onefour Research Farm), 1971–2000 normals, extremes 1928–present
Month	Jan	Feb	Mar	Apr	May	Jun	Jul	Aug	Sep	Oct	Nov	Dec	Year
Record high °C (°F)	18.5 (65.3)	21.0 (69.8)	24.7 (76.5)	32.2 (90.0)	34.4 (93.9)	40.6 (105.1)	40.9 (105.6)	40.6 (105.1)	36.1 (97.0)	32.8 (91.0)	22.6 (72.7)	17.2 (63.0)	40.9 (105.6)
Mean daily maximum °C (°F)	−4.7 (23.5)	−2.3 (27.9)	4.1 (39.4)	12.3 (54.1)	18.3 (64.9)	23.3 (73.9)	26.9 (80.4)	26.1 (79.0)	19.5 (67.1)	13.3 (55.9)	2.8 (37.0)	−2.9 (26.8)	11.4 (52.5)
Daily mean °C (°F)	−10.5 (13.1)	−8.1 (17.4)	−1.8 (28.8)	5.7 (42.3)	11.5 (52.7)	16.2 (61.2)	19.2 (66.6)	18.5 (65.3)	12.0 (53.6)	6.0 (42.8)	−3.2 (26.2)	−8.7 (16.3)	4.7 (40.5)
Mean daily minimum °C (°F)	−16.2 (2.8)	−13.9 (7.0)	−7.7 (18.1)	−1 (30)	4.7 (40.5)	9.0 (48.2)	11.5 (52.7)	10.8 (51.4)	4.6 (40.3)	−1.3 (29.7)	−9.2 (15.4)	−14.5 (5.9)	−1.9 (28.6)
Record low °C (°F)	−42.8 (−45.0)	−42.8 (−45.0)	−35.6 (−32.1)	−26.1 (−15.0)	−13.3 (8.1)	−1.7 (28.9)	1.1 (34.0)	−1 (30)	−12.2 (10.0)	−24 (−11)	−35 (−31)	−41.1 (−42.0)	−42.8 (−45.0)
Average precipitation mm (inches)	22.6 (0.89)	19.0 (0.75)	22.5 (0.89)	28.7 (1.13)	52.8 (2.08)	48.3 (1.90)	34.2 (1.35)	38.6 (1.52)	34.3 (1.35)	14.7 (0.58)	17.1 (0.67)	20.3 (0.80)	353.0 (13.90)
Average rainfall mm (inches)	0.1 (0.00)	0.1 (0.00)	2.4 (0.09)	16.4 (0.65)	49.4 (1.94)	48.3 (1.90)	34.2 (1.35)	38.6 (1.52)	33.0 (1.30)	7.7 (0.30)	1.4 (0.06)	0.5 (0.02)	232.1 (9.14)
Average snowfall cm (inches)	22.5 (8.9)	18.9 (7.4)	20.1 (7.9)	12.2 (4.8)	3.4 (1.3)	0 (0)	0 (0)	0 (0)	1.3 (0.5)	7.0 (2.8)	15.7 (6.2)	19.7 (7.8)	120.9 (47.6)
Average precipitation days (≥ 0.2 mm)	8.9	7.0	7.2	8.4	11.6	10.7	9.6	9.1	7.8	4.9	7.0	8.7	100.8
Average rainy days (≥ 0.2 mm)	0.05	0.10	1.1	5.5	11.2	10.7	9.6	9.1	7.4	3.2	0.95	0.30	59.0
Average snowy days (≥ 0.2 cm)	8.9	6.9	6.2	3.1	0.45	0	0	0	0.35	1.8	6.1	8.4	42.1
Mean monthly sunshine hours	102.8	130.1	172.2	235.2	289.2	319.9	361.2	318.2	231.8	193.6	122.3	90.3	2,566.8
Percentage possible sunshine	38.0	45.5	46.8	57.3	61.0	66.1	73.9	71.3	61.1	57.7	44.4	35.1	54.9
Source: Environment Canada

== Demographics ==
Population history of Manyberries
Year	Pop.	±%
1941	100	—
1951	85	−15.0%
1956	70	−17.6%
1961	103	+47.1%
1966	90	−12.6%
1971	81	−10.0%
1976	60	−25.9%
1981	62	+3.3%
1986	88	+41.9%
1991	96	+9.1%
Source: Statistics Canada

=== Population ===
According to a 1941 study by the University of Alberta, Manyberries' population peaked in 1918, with around 400 residents. Manyberries recorded a population of 96 in the 1991 Census of Population by Statistics Canada.

In a 2003 publication, writer Johnnie Bachusky described Manyberries' population as "below 50."

=== Religion ===
Between 1916 and 1936, places of worship for Presbyterian, German Evangelical, and Evangelical Lutheran congregations were established in or around Manyberries. Two additional churches, Catholic and Lutheran, were established in 1958. By 2009, no churches remained operational in Manyberries.

== Services and places of interest ==
=== Recreation ===
As of 2025, Manyberries Community Hall is maintained by the Manyberries Community Association. The association further organizes events of recreational and tourist interest, including a revival of the Manyberries Rodeo in 2025. As of 2020, the association also maintains a curling rink.

=== Cemeteries ===
First opened in October 1917, the non-denominational Manyberries Cemetery remains open to the public and interments as of the 2010s. The cemeteries of Manyberries' former Evangelical Lutheran and Finnish Lutheran churches also remain accessible to visitors, with the latter receiving interments in the 21st century.

== In popular culture ==
- Musician Corb Lund's 1994 album, Modern Pain, features a song named after Manyberries.
- Writer and media personality Ron Wood published two satirical novels following the interactions of patrons at fictional saloons in the hamlet: And God Created Manyberries (2007), and All Roads Lead to Manyberries (2010).

== See also ==
- List of communities in Alberta
- List of hamlets in Alberta
