= Maleb, Alberta =

Maleb Conquerville
- Locality
- Location within Alberta
- Coordinates: 49°40′10″N 111°13′25″W
- Country: Canada
- Province: Alberta
- Region: Southeast Alberta
- Census division: 1
- Municipal district: County of Forty Mile No. 8
- Founded: 1905

Government
  - Governing body: Forty Mile County Council
  - MP: Jim Hillyer
- Time zone: UTC−06:00 (Alberta Time)
- Postal code span: List of T Postal Codes of Canada
- Area code: +1-403

Maleb, formerly known as Conquerville, is a locality in southern Alberta, Canada within the County of Forty Mile No. 8. It is approximately 23 kilometres (14 mi) south of Highway 3 and 58 kilometres (36 mi) southwest of Medicine Hat.

== History ==
Conquerville, now Maleb, was first established in the early 20th century, the area previously having been used by ranchers along the McLeod Trail destined for Fort McLeod. The route, which had been converted into a railway during the 1890s, brought many passengers and ranchers to the Conquerville area, including coal miners after coal was discovered in the area early in the 20th century. In 1909, Conquerville underwent an agricultural boom, which brought many farmers to the area. The First World War brought prosperity to Conquerville, with the 1915–16 harvest benefiting all; however, the post-war period saw the community fall on hard times. Disease ravaged the local cattle population, and Spanish influenza crippled many families. Grants to farmers, coupled with land grants to new residents supported by the government, led to a revival of the community. In 1945, the Conquerville school opened, which consolidated nine different school districts into one larger centralized district.

In 1954, the community was electrified, and in 1965 the community celebrated the 50th anniversary of its founding, publishing a book, Conquerville: a growing community, to celebrate.

Starting in the 1980s, Conquerville began its decline. During these years, the local high school was closed due to a lack of enrollment and was partially destroyed by fire in 1992. Today all that remains of the community is a basketball court, baseball field, ruins of the high school, overgrown with weeds and now used for storage by a local farmer. The community hall still remains nearby, and is still used on the odd occasion. Only a few residents remain. It is believed that the farming community of the area began its fall when the school closed.

== See also ==
- List of communities in Alberta
- List of ghost towns in Alberta
