= William Carter (photographer) =

American photographer (1934–2025)

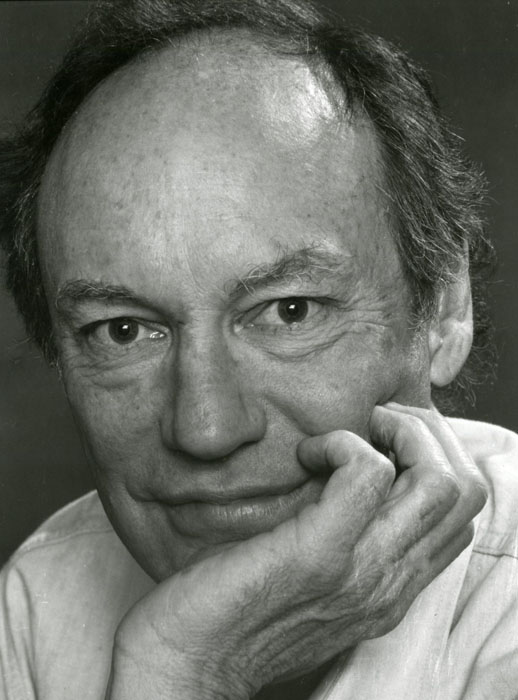
William Carter

William Carter (December 25, 1934 – January 1, 2025) was an American photographer.

== Life and career ==
Carter was born in Los Angeles on December 25, 1934. He graduated from Stanford University in 1957. Moving to Berkeley, California, he became a professional photographer, writer and editor. Living in New York from 1961 to 1963, Carter worked as an editor for publisher Harper & Row. Based in Beirut, Lebanon 1964–1966, he published photographs and articles on subjects such as the Kurds of Iraq in Life, the Sunday Times, Geographical Magazine and others. In 1966-69 he freelanced from London doing assignments for The New York Times, Women’s Wear Daily, and TWA’s Annual Report.

Returning to San Francisco in 1969, Carter turned to longer-term projects. He published his first book of text and pictures, Ghost Towns of the West, in 1971, an in-depth study of the boom-to-bust mining towns preserved in the high-dry climate zones of the American West. His second book, Middle West Country, appeared in 1975, and was a historical study of the Midwest from the earliest settlements by European farmers to the present era of mechanised agriculture. In 1991, Carter’s lifelong interest in New Orleans jazz led him to create his third book of text and photographs, Preservation Hall.

Increasingly drawn to classic fine-art photography, in 1996 he published Illuminations, a book of nudes.

Then came Carter’s fifth book, Causes and Spirits: Photographs from Five Decades. Published by Steidl in 2011, this is a photo-appreciation of humanity worldwide.

Having toured nationally and recorded as clarinetist with Turk Murphy’s Jazz Band at age twenty, William Carter remained active as a semi-professional jazz musician into his eighties. From 1990 to 2015 he served as Chairman of the San Francisco Traditional Jazz Foundation. In 2015 he mounted an exhibition of his jazz and blues photographs, including portraits of Louis Armstrong donated to the Armstrong House and Museum in Queens, New York.

Carter’s decades of travel photography took him throughout the world. Closer to home, he documented the birth and care of premature babies in the neo-natal department of the Stanford University Hospital.

William Carter’s photographs have been exhibited throughout the U.S. and in Europe. Over 250 of his black and white prints are held in the permanent collection of the J. Paul Getty Museum in Los Angeles. A Carter nude was shown in the Getty’s concise 150-year history of the genre in 2007-2008. Four of his Middle Eastern prints were exhibited at the Getty in "Engaged Observers," a major 2010 survey of photojournalism since 1960. Four Carter photographs of western Americana were shown at the San Francisco Museum of Modern Art; another, “Near Jerome, Arizona, 1970” was mounted at that museum’s grand reopening in 2016. His classic nudes were presented in the 1990s at Galerie zur Stockeregg in Zurich, Switzerland.

Carter was a founding board member of Photo Alliance, San Francisco, in 1996. He served on the board of Humanities West, San Francisco, from 1996 to 2001, where he produced programs on Jerusalem and New Orleans. He was also a founding member of the Photographs Council at the J. Paul Getty Museum from 2005 until 2012.

Carter died in Oakland, California, on January 1, 2025, at the age of 90.

== Collections ==
Museum collections containing photographs by William Carter:

- National Gallery of Art, Washington, D.C.
- J. Paul Getty Museum, Los Angeles, California
- Museum of Fine Arts, Houston, Texas
- University of Texas at Austin, Austin, Texas
- San Francisco Museum of Modern Art, California
- Portland Art Museum, Portland, Oregon
- Santa Barbara Museum of Art, Santa Barbara, California
- Center for Creative Photography, Tucson, Arizona
- Museum of Contemporary Photography, Columbia College, Chicago
- John and Mable Ringling Museum of Art, Sarasota, Florida
- Davison Art Center, Wesleyan University, Connecticut
- Rhode Island School of Design Museum, Providence, Rhode Island
- Fogg Museum, Harvard University, Cambridge, Massachusetts
- Cantor Center for Visual Arts, Stanford University
- Louis Armstrong Jazz Foundation, Queens, New York
- Folkwang Museum, Essen, Germany
- Museum Ludwig, Cologne, Germany
- Collection Paris Audio-Visual, France
- Bibliothèque Nationale de France, Paris
- Royal Photographic Society, Bath, England
