= Aden, Alberta =

Community in Alberta, Canada

Coordinates: 48°59′52″N 111°15′29″W

Location of Aden in Alberta

Aden is a locality in the County of Forty Mile No. 8, Alberta. It serves as a port of entry into the U.S. state of Montana for the nearby Canada – United States border crossing. The port of entry is located where Alberta Highway 880 continues as Secondary Highway 409 within Liberty County, Montana.

The locality takes its name from Aden, a port city in Yemen.

== Climate ==
Aden experiences a humid continental climate (Köppen climate classification Dfb) that just barely falls short of being a semi-arid climate (Köppen BSk). Winters are long and dry, but only mildly cold, while summers are short but very warm. Precipitation is low, with an annual average of 407 mm, and is concentrated in the warmer months.

Climate data for Aden
Month	Jan	Feb	Mar	Apr	May	Jun	Jul	Aug	Sep	Oct	Nov	Dec	Year
Record high °C (°F)	17.0 (62.6)	23.0 (73.4)	23.3 (73.9)	29.5 (85.1)	32.0 (89.6)	36.0 (96.8)	38.0 (100.4)	39.4 (102.9)	36.1 (97.0)	30.0 (86.0)	23.5 (74.3)	18.0 (64.4)	39.4 (102.9)
Mean daily maximum °C (°F)	−0.8 (30.6)	1.9 (35.4)	5.8 (42.4)	12.6 (54.7)	17.7 (63.9)	21.9 (71.4)	26.2 (79.2)	26.2 (79.2)	19.8 (67.6)	13.5 (56.3)	4.3 (39.7)	1.0 (33.8)	12.5 (54.5)
Daily mean °C (°F)	−6.5 (20.3)	−3.6 (25.5)	0.2 (32.4)	6.4 (43.5)	11.3 (52.3)	15.5 (59.9)	19.0 (66.2)	18.9 (66.0)	13.1 (55.6)	7.6 (45.7)	−1.0 (30.2)	−4.3 (24.3)	6.4 (43.5)
Mean daily minimum °C (°F)	−12.0 (10.4)	−9.1 (15.6)	−5.4 (22.3)	0.1 (32.2)	4.9 (40.8)	9.1 (48.4)	11.7 (53.1)	11.6 (52.9)	6.4 (43.5)	1.6 (34.9)	−6.1 (21.0)	−9.5 (14.9)	0.3 (32.5)
Record low °C (°F)	−37.2 (−35.0)	−37.0 (−34.6)	−29.4 (−20.9)	−18.9 (−2.0)	−8.9 (16.0)	−1.0 (30.2)	−0.6 (30.9)	−0.5 (31.1)	−12.2 (10.0)	−27.0 (−16.6)	−33.5 (−28.3)	−40.0 (−40.0)	−40.0 (−40.0)
Average precipitation mm (inches)	22.2 (0.87)	15.3 (0.60)	29.9 (1.18)	33.3 (1.31)	59.2 (2.33)	70.2 (2.76)	37.3 (1.47)	43.2 (1.70)	38.8 (1.53)	20.6 (0.81)	16.6 (0.65)	20.3 (0.80)	406.9 (16.02)
Average rainfall mm (inches)	0.1 (0.00)	0.8 (0.03)	2.0 (0.08)	21.4 (0.84)	55.9 (2.20)	70.2 (2.76)	37.3 (1.47)	42.6 (1.68)	37.4 (1.47)	13.5 (0.53)	0.9 (0.04)	0.5 (0.02)	282.7 (11.13)
Average snowfall cm (inches)	22.1 (8.7)	14.4 (5.7)	27.9 (11.0)	11.9 (4.7)	3.3 (1.3)	0.0 (0.0)	0.0 (0.0)	0.6 (0.2)	1.4 (0.6)	7.1 (2.8)	15.7 (6.2)	19.8 (7.8)	124.2 (48.9)
Average precipitation days (≥ 0.2 mm)	5.4	3.9	5.0	5.0	8.4	9.2	6.8	6.4	6.2	4.0	3.4	4.6	68.3
Average rainy days (≥ 0.2 mm)	0.1	0.3	0.4	3.6	8.3	9.2	6.8	6.4	6.1	2.9	0.5	0.2	44.7
Average snowy days (≥ 0.2 cm)	5.3	3.6	4.6	1.6	0.3	0.0	0.0	0.1	0.1	1.1	3.0	4.4	24.2
Source: Environment Canada
