= County of Forty Mile No. 8 =

Municipal district in Alberta, Canada

- Municipal district
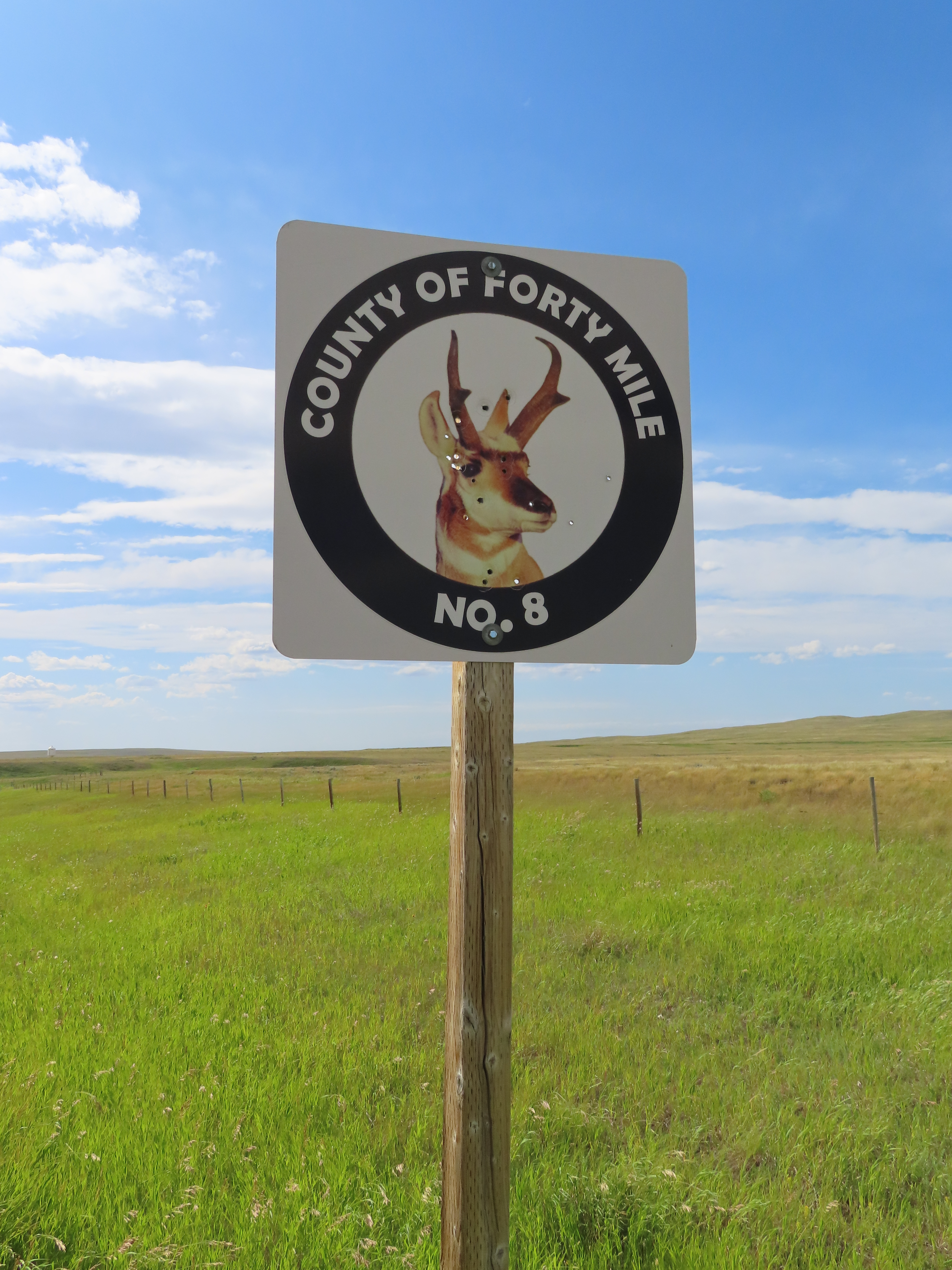
- Seal Welcome sign

- Location within Alberta
- Country: Canada
- Province: Alberta
- Region: Southern Alberta
- Planning region: South Saskatchewan
- Established: 1954
- Incorporated: 1958

Government
  - Reeve: Stacey Barrows
  - Governing body: County of Forty Mile Council
  - Administrative office: Foremost

Area (2021)
  - Land: 7,163.61 km^{2} (2,765.89 sq mi)

Population (2021)
  - Total: 3,600
- Time zone: UTC−06:00 (Alberta Time)
- Website: 40mile.ca

The County of Forty Mile No. 8 is a municipal district in south eastern Alberta, Canada. It is located in Census Division 1, southwest of Medicine Hat. Its municipal office is located in the Village of Foremost.

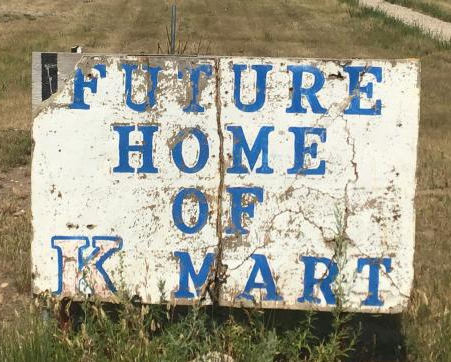
The "Future Home of Kmart" sign located inside of the abandoned locality of Nemiskam inside of Forty Mile No. 8 County

The County of Forty Mile is filled with several ghost towns such as Nemiskam, Orion, Conquerville, Altorado, Conrad, and the partially abandoned Etzikom.

== Geography ==
=== Communities and localities ===
The following urban municipalities are surrounded by the County of Forty Mile No. 8.

Cities

- none

Towns

- Bow Island

Villages

- Foremost

Summer villages

- none

The following hamlets are located within the County of Forty Mile No. 8.

Hamlets

- Burdett (dissolved from village status on January 1, 2003)
- Etzikom
- Manyberries
- Orion
- Skiff
- Whitla
- Winnifred

The following localities are located within the County of Forty Mile No. 8.

Localities

- Aden
- Avalon
- Bingen
- Birdsholm
- Comrey
- Endon
- Faith
- Florann
- Gahern
- Goddard
- Granlea
- Groton

- Hoping
- Inversnay
- Jensen
- Juno
- Legend
- Maleb (previously Conquerville)
- Nemiscam
- Pakowki
- Pendant d'Oreille
- Pinhorn
- Ranchville

Other places

- Altorado

== Demographics ==
In the 2021 Census of Population conducted by Statistics Canada, the County of Forty Mile No. 8 had a population of 3,600 living in 861 of its 994 total private dwellings, a change of 0.5% from its 2016 population of 3,581. With a land area of 7,163.61 km^{2} (2,765.89 sq mi), it had a population density of 0.5/km^{2} (1.3/sq mi) in 2021.

In the 2016 Census of Population conducted by Statistics Canada, the County of Forty Mile No. 8 had a population of 3,581 living in 865 of its 968 total private dwellings, a 7.3% change from its 2011 population of 3,336. With a land area of 7,249.31 km^{2} (2,798.97 sq mi), it had a population density of 0.5/km^{2} (1.3/sq mi) in 2016.

== See also ==
- List of communities in Alberta
- List of municipal districts in Alberta
- List of ghost towns in Alberta
