= Bumper crop =

Crop that has yielded an unusually productive harvest

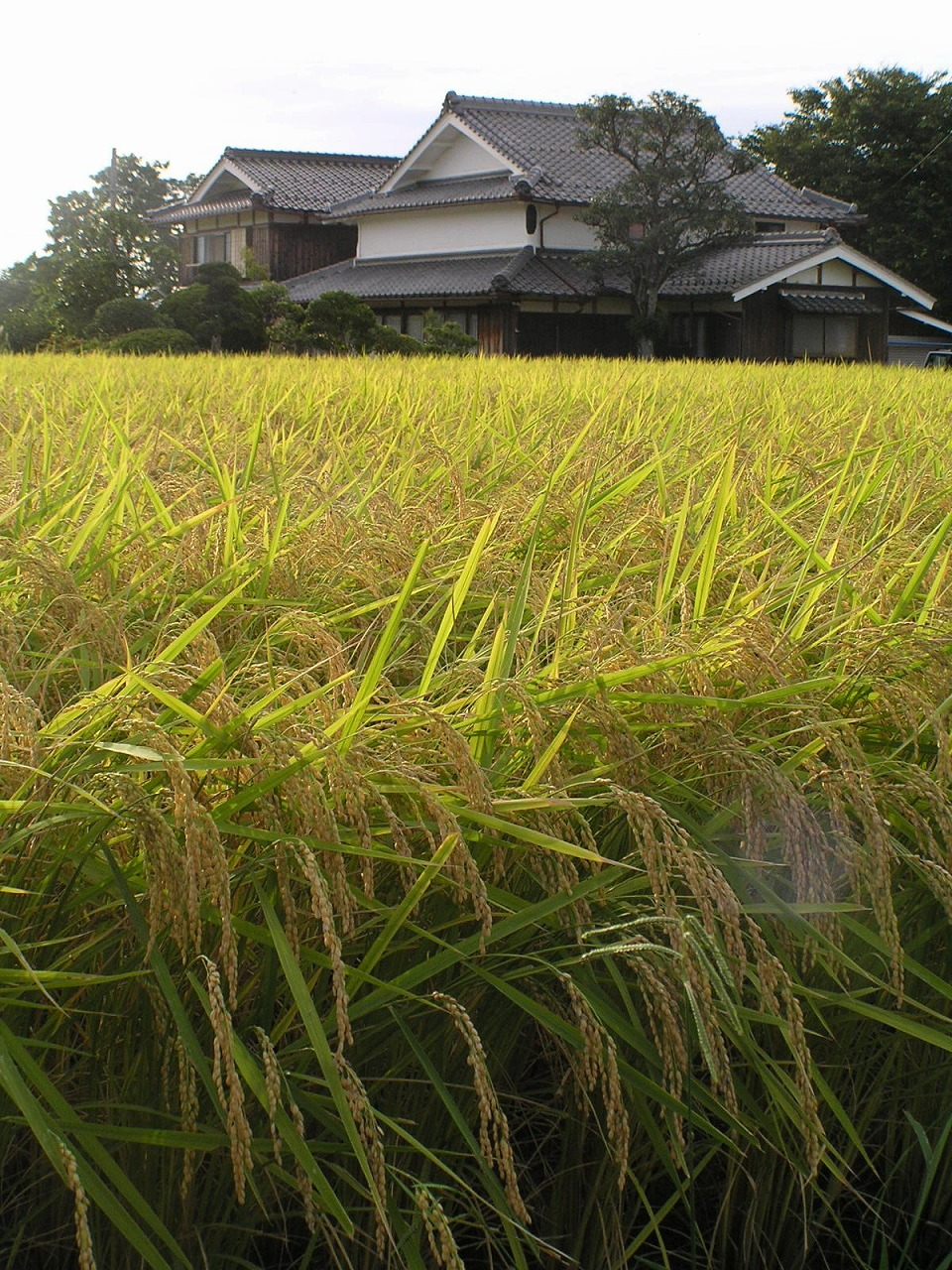
Rice field in Japan

In agriculture, a bumper crop is a crop that has yielded an unusually productive harvest. The word "bumper" in this context comes from a usage that means "something unusually large", which is where this term comes from.

Though very productive harvests often have positive implications for the producer, a bumper crop can also be a source of problems, such as when there is insufficient storage space (barns, grain bins, etc.) for the overlarge crop.

The term "bumper crop" has also been used to refer to a similar large result in other activities, or as a pun, such as with a group of automobiles (for their front/rear bumpers).
