= Orion, Alberta =

Orion
- Hamlet
- Location of Orion in Alberta
- Coordinates: 49°27′12″N 110°48′38″W
- Country: Canada
- Province: Alberta
- Region: Southern Alberta
- Census division: 2
- Municipal district: County of Forty Mile No. 8
- Founded: 1916

Government
  - Governing body: County of Forty Mile No. 8 Council
- Elevation: 895 m (2,936 ft)

Population (1991)
  - Total: 11
- Time zone: UTC−06:00 (Alberta Time)
- Postal code span: T0K 1S0
- Area code: +1-403
- Highways: Highway 61
- Waterways: Pakowki lake

Orion is a hamlet in Alberta, Canada within the County of Forty Mile No. 8. The hamlet is located approximately 78 kilometres (48 mi) south of Medicine Hat along Highway 61.

== Toponymy ==
Orion is likely named after the constellation. The name Orion itself derives from a legendary hunter in Greek myth.

Roads in the hamlet were also given names derived from figures in Greek and Roman myths. These are the avenues of Chios and Merope, and the streets of Aenopion, Hero and Diana. Orion's remaining two roads, Rigel Avenue and Sirius Street, are named after astronomical objects.

== Demographics ==
Orion recorded a population of 11 in the 1991 Census of Population conducted by Statistics Canada. In 2020, CBC News reported that approximately seven people lived in Orion. CHAT News estimated Orion's population to be two as of 2024.

== Geography ==
=== Fauna ===
In 2021 residents of Orion and the Alberta Fish and Game Association cooperated to install an antelope fencing program in the hamlet. The purpose of the program was to make cattle fences easier for Pronghorn antelopes to cross.

== History ==
=== Early history ===
Orion is within the Forty Mile Coulee and Reservoir district of southern Alberta. Prior to the arrival of European settlers, the region was inhabited by a variety of Indigenous peoples, including the Cree, Sioux, and Blackfoot Confederacy. In the 1980s, archaeological assessments of the district and Orion found items of historic interest, some prehistoric and others ranging in age from 2,000 to 400 years old. Items included tipi rings and stone circles, as well as evidence of nomadic occupation and bison hunts, indicating sustained activity by Indigenous peoples. Most items discovered appeared to originate from the Blackfoot Confederacy.

=== Assessment for settlement: 1850–1899 ===
Between 1857 and 1860, Irish-born geographer John Palliser led the British North American Exploring Expedition to investigate the geography, climate and ecology of what is today Western Canada. He identified an area now known as the Palliser's Triangle, which contains Orion, as particularly ill-suited for permanent agriculture. Dissenting opinions from geologist Henry Hind (in 1857) and naturalist John Macoun (in the 1870s) appealed to expansionists in government, who sought to improve Canada's economic and political standing by enlarging its territory. For the remainder of the 19th century, the government launched an aggressive advertising campaign to attract European and American homesteaders to the Prairies, disregarding Palliser's warnings.

=== Founding and becoming Orion: 1900–1920 ===
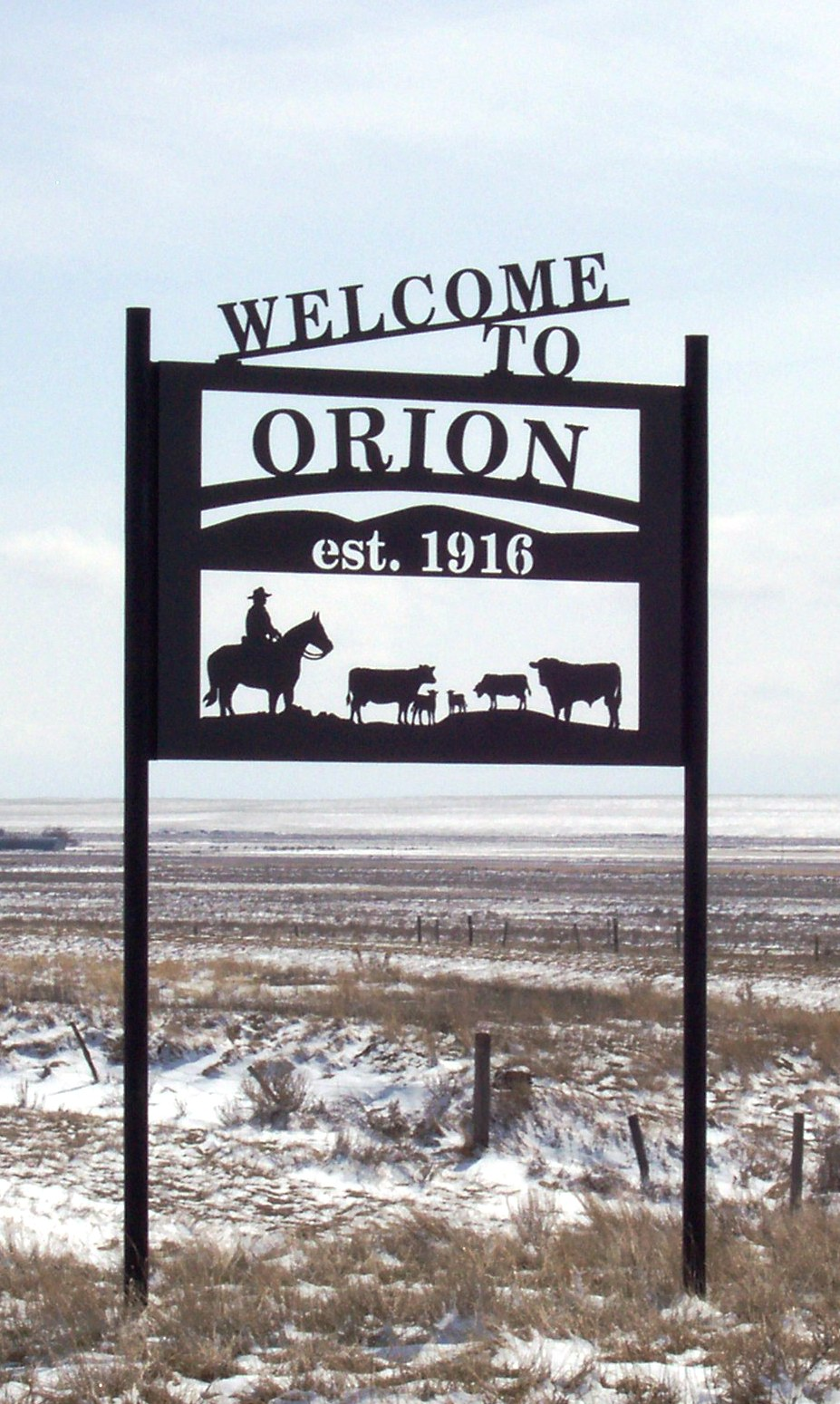
Orion, Alberta welcome sign.

Prior to 1916, the area that would become known as Orion was populated solely by farms. One family that moved to the area to establish a homestead in 1910 was that of Wilfrid Eggleston, who later became an influential journalist. Eggleston's father estimated that the area contained around 27 homesteads at the time of the family's arrival, though not all were inhabited.

Most early arrivals were American or Scandinavian. One was Harvard-educated doctor Samuel Bartlett, who had ceased practicing in Lexington to establish a homestead in 1911. Another was Axel Mattson, a Swedish farmer who became the locality's first postmaster in October 1912. At this time, the locality was known as Needmore (so named because residents felt they 'needed more' sheep) and the post office went by this name for around four years.

In early 1916 the Canadian Pacific Railway (CPR) established a nearby siding and train station, which it named Orion, likely derived from the constellation. Historian Dale Speirs posits this name may have been selected because the constellation is visible in Alberta skies on clear nights, and Orion's belt would have been recognizable to settlers. Orion's roads were given names similarly inspired by Greek or Roman myths. Needmore and its post office changed name as well.

The Orion post office, established in March 1916, operated from a general store. Orion's early development was further accelerated in 1916 after farms in the area enjoyed a bumper crop, which attracted more settlers. In 1917, many businesses established in Pakowki relocated to Orion after that settlement failed, and a school that had operated nearby since 1912 also moved to Orion.

By 1918, 150 people lived in Orion. Active businesses included a warehouse, hotel, a branch of the Standard Bank of Canada, and two Chinese restaurants. In his memoirs, Eggleston would recall working for short times at the warehouse, store, and finally the bank between 1916 and 1918. Four grain elevators were built in Orion by 1920, and the hamlet reached a peak of over 350 residents. At least 11 men from Orion enlisted in the First World War, of which four died in action.

=== 'Prairie Dry Belt Disaster' and recovery: 1921–1929 ===
Orion's crop yields in the early 1920s were poor, owing to drought, dust storms and grasshopper infestations. These conditions, which were typical of the prairies at the time, persisted through the 1920s. Businesses and amenities continued to open in Orion throughout the decade, which was a period later known as the "Prairie Belt Disaster." Establishments that opened by 1926 included a drug store, pool hall, and dance hall. Two lumber and livery yards opened as well. Nonetheless, many of these outfits would close within a decade.

Although crop yields recovered around 1928, dozens of Orion residents had left by then. Some operations, including the post office and livery yards, were lost to fires, which were a recurring problem in Orion, owing to its dry climate. Axel Mattson, early arrival to Orion and former Needmore postmaster, bought the farms of several families who opted to leave, including the Eggleston family's. The Alberta Wheat Pool bought one of Orion's grain elevators in 1929.

Outside of unpredictable agricultural conditions, Orion's residents were also vulnerable to disease, due to Orion's distance from the nearest hospital at Medicine Hat. During Orion's early decades, local healthcare primarily came from Samuel Bartlett. Amidst the Spanish Flu pandemic (1918–1920), he received permission from the provincial government to act as Orion's medical officer, owing to his past career as a physician. Bartlett treated locals without charge and continued to do so until his death in 1956. Orion and nearby areas also received care, particularly via vaccinations for children, from nurse Ada Snortland.

Although Orion enjoyed more residents with medical training than similar settlements nearby, several young residents died from circumstances that may otherwise have been treatable, such as appendicitis or injuries from farming accidents. Residents also died from the Spanish Flu, including postmaster John Eklund in early 1919. Thomas Chambers, a returning First World War veteran, took over the operation from Esther Eklund in July 1919. When the building burned down in 1929, Chambers rebuilt it; he remained Orion's postmaster until October 1947.

Reflecting on the region's early development in a 1970 publication, a local history committee opined that many farmers were "enticed to come" to Orion and surrounding areas "under false illusions, to... give their best years in hard toil for no return." Eggleston would, in his 1982 memoir, take the view that settlers could not "throw all the blame on the authorities," as a "wealth of data" was already available about the dry belt, such as the work of John Palliser. Even so, he opined that "propaganda" bordering on "fraudulent advertising" had been used to sell homesteads to settlers who saw it as a route to economic independence.

=== Dust Bowl years and aftermath: 1930–1949 ===
The reprieve Orion enjoyed from poor yields was temporary, as the 1930s were marked by a series of dust storms termed the Dust Bowl. An "unprecedented decade of drought" across the Prairie provinces further reduced Orion's farming population. Reflecting on the Dust Bowl years for a 1970 local history book, farmers from Orion and surrounding areas characterized 1930 as "the beginning of a very hard 8 years." Around 1936, resident Howard Stevens opened an auto shop and hardware store, Stevens Hardware and Garage. To house his business, he moved a schoolhouse from Manyberries that had been built in 1910, but since abandoned. A community hall also opened in Orion in 1936.

Some farmers who remained in Orion during this period profited from the decline in local competition. They were able to acquire land and machinery from departing farmers at discounted rates, and could be selective about which plots they farmed. Axel Mattson was a notable beneficiary of Orion's depopulation. During a visit to Orion in 1932, Wilfrid Eggleston estimated that Mattson, who had moved into the former Eggleston property, had grown 60 acres of wheat. Nonetheless, most local farmers would reflect on the Dust Bowl years as unproductive, describing the 1942 yield as their "first good crop for a long, long time."

In the early 1940s smaller schools from surrounding areas were consolidated; students from the nearby localities of Glen Banner and Barby were transported to Orion to learn.

=== Decline to current day: 1950–present ===
Orion's longest-serving postmaster, Thomas Chambers, resigned from his post in October 1947. A succession of postmasters took over for no more than seven years at a time until the office was absorbed by the Orion Co-Op Association in February 1976.

By 1951 long-term resident Axel Mattson had acquired 2,500 acres of abandoned land. In 1953, Orion's crop output was steady enough that farmers created a lottery system to determine the order in which they would be permitted to use the grain elevators. Alberta Wheat Pool constructed another grain elevator in the hamlet in 1955. Mattson retired to Medicine Hat in 1958, and died in 1960 at the age of 86.

Orion came under the governance of the County of Forty Mile No. 8 in 1958, and the County decided to consolidate more schools in its jurisdiction. The Orion school closed, and its building was purchased by the Evangelical Free Church of Etzikom that same year for conversion into a place of worship. Boyd Stevens, who had begun working with his father at Stevens Hardware and Garage in 1954, would later describe the loss of the school and its baseball pitch as a "kick in the pants" to Orion's community.

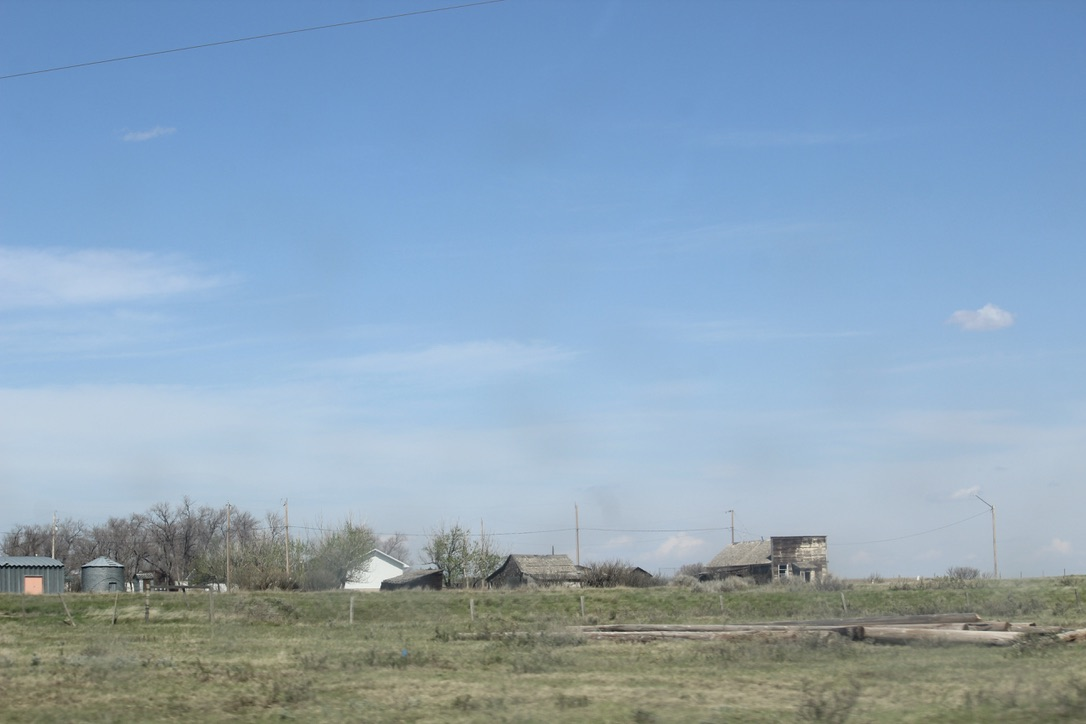
Photograph of Orion skyline as of 2024. Some abandoned structures are visible.

Passenger rail services to Orion ended in 1965. The following year, Orion reportedly had a population of 25. According to the Leader Post, this figure had reduced to 11 by 1988. Freight services between Manyberries and Orion ended in April 1990, when the CPR discontinued them. Services between Orion and Etzikom ended in 1999, and the track into Orion was removed. Orion's last operational grain elevator closed for business in 1998. Its last standing elevator was demolished in 2003, a year in which Orion reportedly had six residents. In 2013, Orion's population had reportedly declined again to four.

The communities of Orion and Manyberries celebrated a joint centennial in July 2016. Later that year, on Christmas Day, Stevens Hardware and Garage caught fire just as the morning church service was beginning. Congregants rushed to the scene, and Boyd Stevens was taken to a hospital in Calgary. The store front was destroyed, but was able to be rebuilt by 2017; Stevens resumed operations until retiring in 2022. As of 2024, Orion's population is estimated to be two.

== Tourist interest in Orion as a ghost town ==
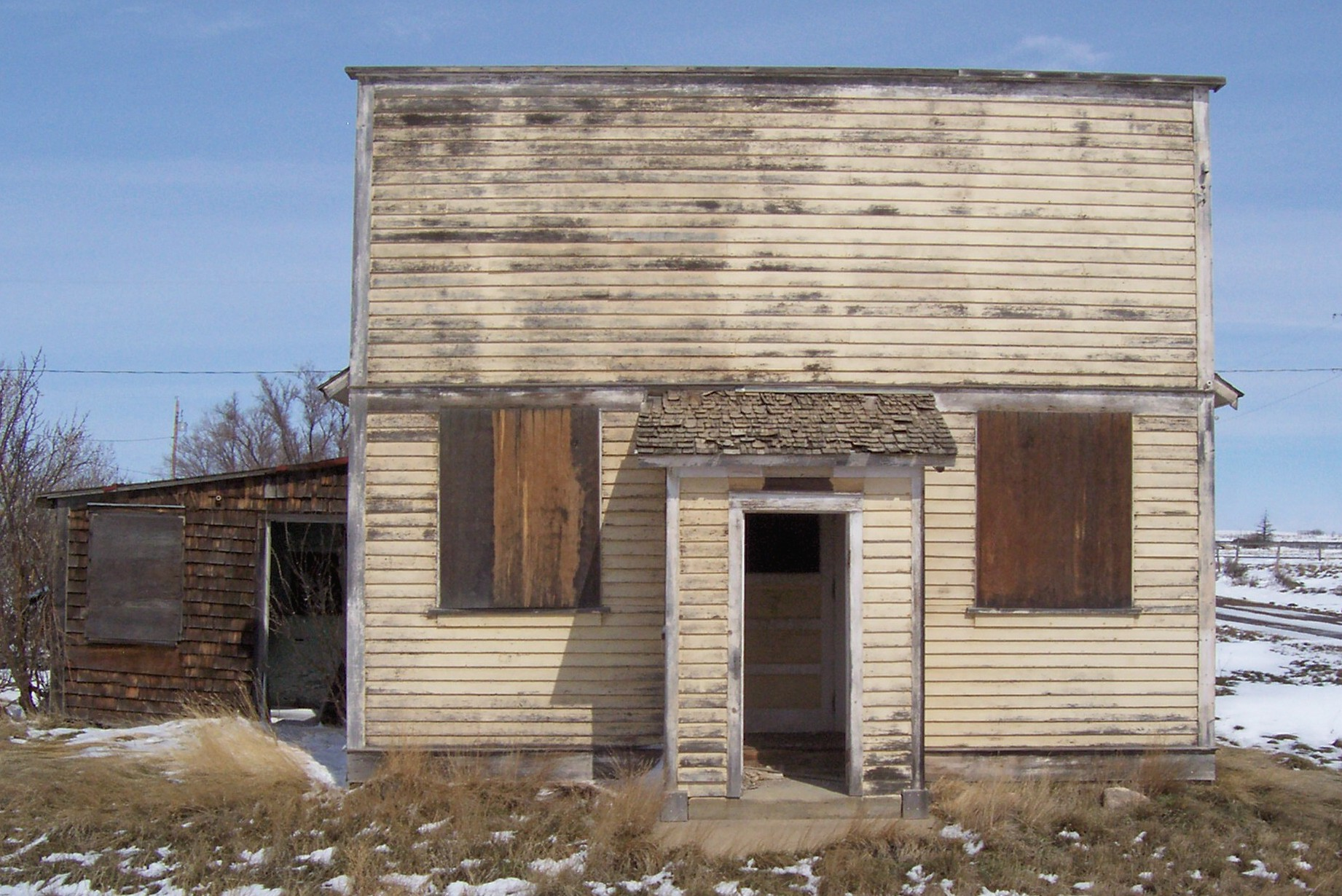
The ruins of a convenience store in Orion, photographed in 2007.

Before his death in May 2023, long-time resident Boyd Stevens gave several interviews describing how Orion had, over the years, become a tourist attraction for travellers interested in ghost towns. Indeed, Orion has received national and international media attention for its abandoned structures and depopulation, even though other settlements in the vicinity (such as Pakowki) experienced faster declines in population or commercial activity.

Stevens enjoyed sharing stories of his upbringing in Orion with visitors. Often, he joked with them that he was still living in Orion because he had "missed the last train" from the hamlet. In 2013, he told Alberta Farmer Express: "[I]t's nice to see these folks who come by to see history. They are honouring the good old days, and that is a good thing." In 2014, director Sean Thonson shot a short film about Stevens entitled Passing Orion, hosted on Thonson's website as of 2025.

== Services ==
As of 2025, Orion maintains a co-op general store and post office. The Evangelical Free Church remains in occasional use.

== Notable residents ==
- Wilfrid Eggleston — journalist, author and founder of the Carleton School of Journalism
- Boyd Stevens – proprietor of Stevens Hardware and Garage; well-known locally for his longevity as a resident of Orion

== See also ==
- List of communities in Alberta
- List of hamlets in Alberta
- List of ghost towns in Alberta
