= Bow Island =

- Town
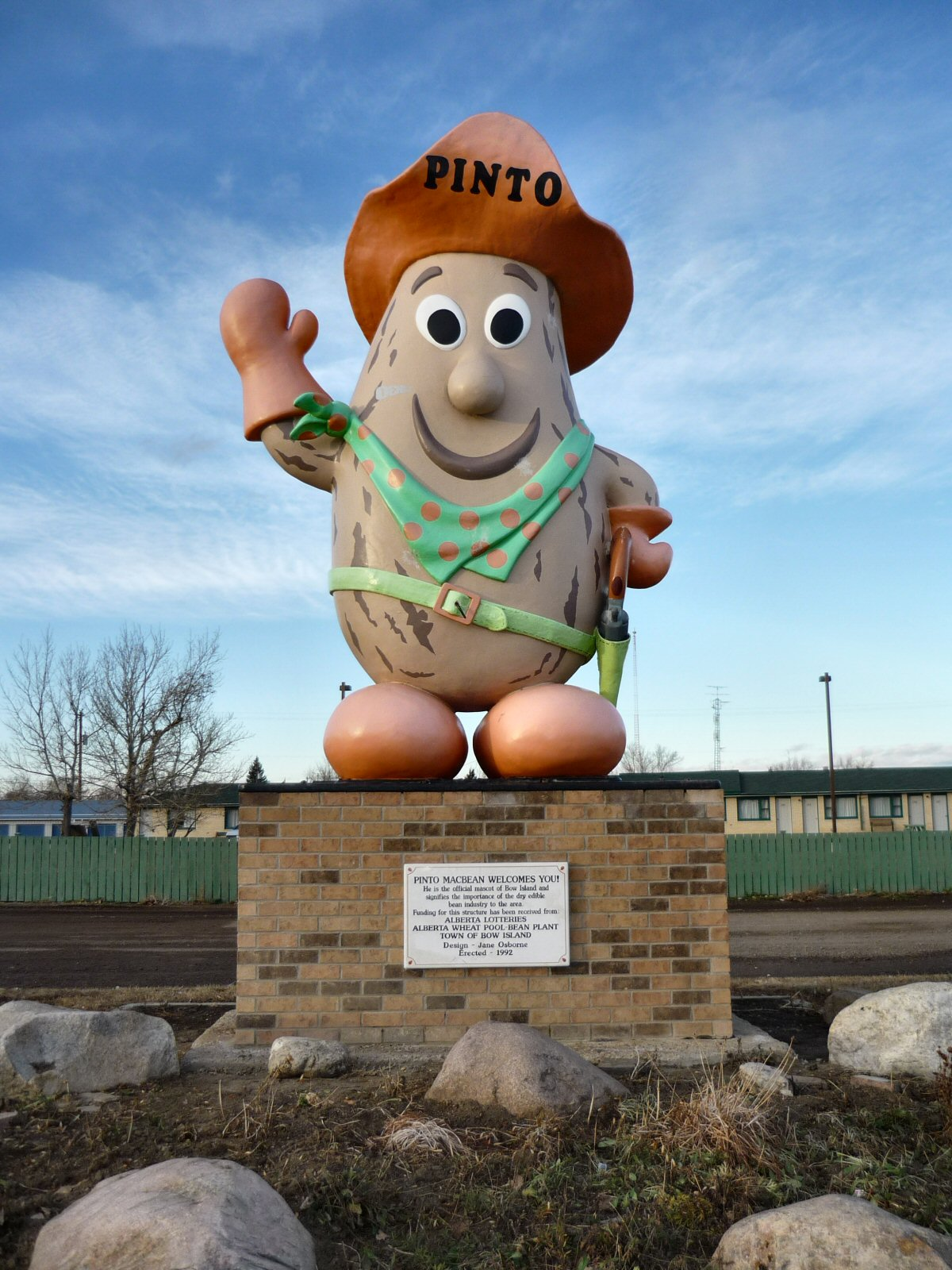
- Pinto MacBean

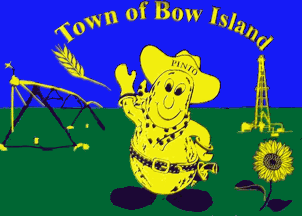
- Flag

- Location of Bow Island in Alberta
- Coordinates: 49°52′03″N 111°22′46″W
- Country: Canada
- Province: Alberta
- Region: Southern Alberta
- Census division: 1
- Municipal district: County of Forty Mile No. 8
- Incorporated
  - Village: June 14, 1910
  - Town: February 1, 1912

Government
  - Mayor: Gordon Reynolds
  - Governing body: Bow Island Town Council

Area (2021)
  - Land: 5.68 km^{2} (2.19 sq mi)
- Elevation: 799 m (2,621 ft)

Population (2021)
  - Total: 2,036
  - Density: 358.5/km^{2} (929/sq mi)
- Time zone: UTC−06:00 (Alberta Time)
- Postal code span: T0K 0G0
- Area code: 1+403
- Highways: Highway 3
- Waterway: South Saskatchewan River
- Website: www.bowisland.com

Bow Island (/boʊ/) is a town in Alberta, Canada. It is located on Highway 3 in southern Alberta, approximately 100 km (62 mi) north of the United States border, 320 km (200 mi) southeast of Calgary and 51 km (32 mi) southwest of Medicine Hat.

== History ==
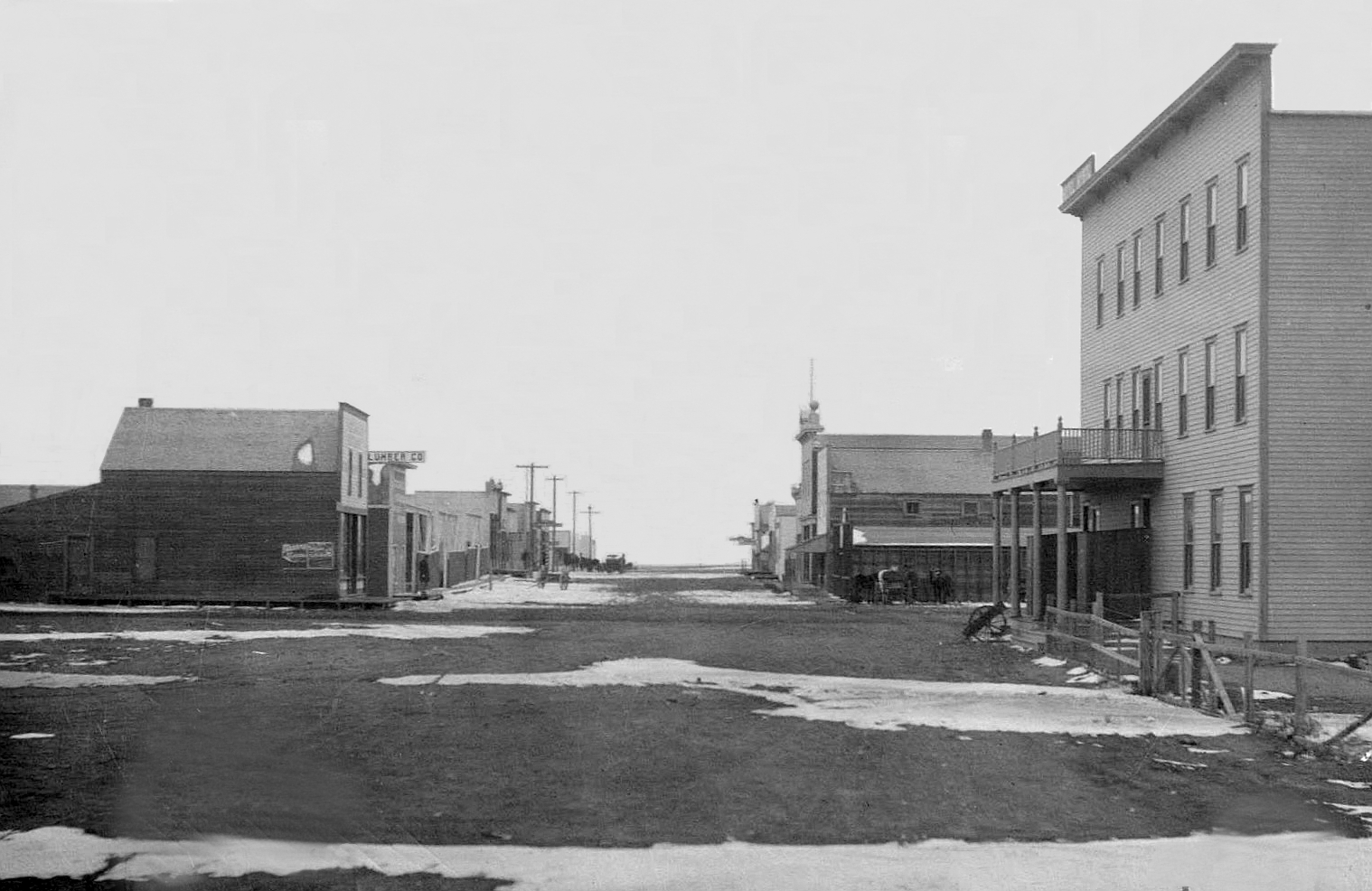
Bow Island, circa 1910

The community of Bow Island received its first post-colonial families in 1900. In February 1910, the Village of Bow Island was formed, and by March 1912 the village was declared the Town of Bow Island.

The naming of Bow Island brings many stories to the forefront, but the most prominent one is that the communities of Grassy Lake, approximately 25 km (16 mi) to the west, and Bow Island had their respective names mixed up. An island named "Bow Island" is located north of Grassy Lake near the confluence of the Bow River and the Oldman River, while a low depressional area named "Grassy Lake" is located south of Bow Island.

Bow Island was one of the first towns in Alberta to have natural gas wells and operated them until the franchise was sold to a private company.

In the early 1950s, irrigation was extended to the Bow Island area, and the town doubled in population. Bow Island is surrounded by 110,000 acres (445 km^{2}) of highly productive lands. Some of the most modern irrigation systems in the world are located in the area; the first pivot and linear sprinkler systems in Canada were erected in the Bow Island area. A completely automated distribution system was installed in 1982 by the St. Mary River Irrigation District (SMRID), and it serves an area of 5,000 acres (20 km^{2}). The system is known as the Lateral 12 System and has been toured by groups from around the world.

== Geography ==
Bow Island is located between the cities of Lethbridge and Medicine Hat. Its nearest community is the Hamlet of Burdett. The town of Bow Island sits inside of Forty Mile County.

== Demographics ==
In the 2021 Census of Population conducted by Statistics Canada, the Town of Bow Island had a population of 2,036 living in 674 of its 724 total private dwellings, a change of 2.7% from its 2016 population of 1,983. With a land area of 5.68 km^{2} (2.19 sq mi), it had a population density of 358.5/km^{2} (928.4/sq mi) in 2021.

The population of the Town of Bow Island according to its 2017 municipal census is 2,043, a change of 9.4% from its 2007 municipal census population of 1,868.

In the 2016 Census of Population conducted by Statistics Canada, the Town of Bow Island recorded a population of 1,983 living in 636 of its 682 total private dwellings, a −2.1% change from its 2011 population of 2,025. With a land area of 5.81 km^{2} (2.24 sq mi), it had a population density of 341.3/km^{2} (884.0/sq mi) in 2016.

== Economy ==
Bow Island is well known for its dry edible bean industry. A 5.5-metre (18 ft) tall statue of the mascot "Pinto MacBean" is located adjacent to Highway No. 3 and greets everyone coming into town. Bow Island is also the largest spearmint-producing region in Canada, with 4 farms in the surrounding area producing 25% of the North American demand for Scotch spearmint essential oil, used in flavouring candy, gum, mints and toothpaste.

A mustard seed processing facility was opened in Bow Island in 2019. The site was originally the home of Spitz, which started producing sunflower seeds there in 1982. Spitz was sold to PepsiCo in 2008, and production was moved out in 2018.

== Arts and culture ==
"Blues at the Bow Live", located in the historic Bow Theatre, is an internationally renowned live blues venue featuring Grammy and Juno Award winning blues artists. This nonprofit, solely volunteer operated Canadian blues society was formed in 1993. The society's first show to be held in the Bow Theatre took place on December 17, 1994. They have been hosting sold-out performances since inception. Blues at the Bow draws patrons from every corner of the province of Alberta and beyond.

== Education ==
Bow Island has three public schools, Senator Gershaw School (which serves Grades 4–12), Bow Island Elementary School (serving K-Grade 3), and St. Michael's School, a Catholic school that educates children from Pre-K to Grade 3. Senator Gershaw and Bow Island Elementary are part of the Prairie Rose School Division, while St. Michael's is part of Holy Spirit Catholic Schools.

Bow Island also has one private Christian school: Cherry Coulee Christian Academy. A Mennonite Christian school is also located is Bow Island just south of Centennial Park, called Sun Country Christian School.

== Notable people ==
- Noeline Hofmann, country and western singer-songwriter
- Troy Loney, former professional hockey player
- Clyfford Still, artist
- Skyler Stromsmoe, professional baseball player
- Nicholas Taylor, former Canadian senator

== Climate ==
Climate data for Bow Island
Month	Jan	Feb	Mar	Apr	May	Jun	Jul	Aug	Sep	Oct	Nov	Dec	Year
Record high °C (°F)	15.2 (59.4)	19.5 (67.1)	25.4 (77.7)	30.8 (87.4)	33.2 (91.8)	34.5 (94.1)	36.6 (97.9)	39.5 (103.1)	35.6 (96.1)	29.4 (84.9)	24.2 (75.6)	16.3 (61.3)	39.5 (103.1)
Mean daily maximum °C (°F)	−2.3 (27.9)	0.4 (32.7)	5.3 (41.5)	12.8 (55.0)	18.5 (65.3)	22.2 (72.0)	26.6 (79.9)	26.2 (79.2)	20.9 (69.6)	13.2 (55.8)	4.6 (40.3)	−1.3 (29.7)	12.3 (54.1)
Mean daily minimum °C (°F)	−13.4 (7.9)	−12.3 (9.9)	−6.7 (19.9)	−0.9 (30.4)	4.7 (40.5)	9.1 (48.4)	11.2 (52.2)	10.2 (50.4)	5.7 (42.3)	−0.2 (31.6)	−7.1 (19.2)	−12.3 (9.9)	−1.0 (30.2)
Record low °C (°F)	−43.5 (−46.3)	−37.7 (−35.9)	−39.2 (−38.6)	−19.3 (−2.7)	−9.1 (15.6)	0.2 (32.4)	0.0 (32.0)	1.1 (34.0)	−8.5 (16.7)	−21.0 (−5.8)	−35.8 (−32.4)	−39.6 (−39.3)	−43.5 (−46.3)
Source: weatherstats.ca

== See also ==
- List of communities in Alberta
- List of towns in Alberta
- County of Forty Mile No. 8
