= Foremost, Alberta =

Foremost
- Village
- Village of Foremost
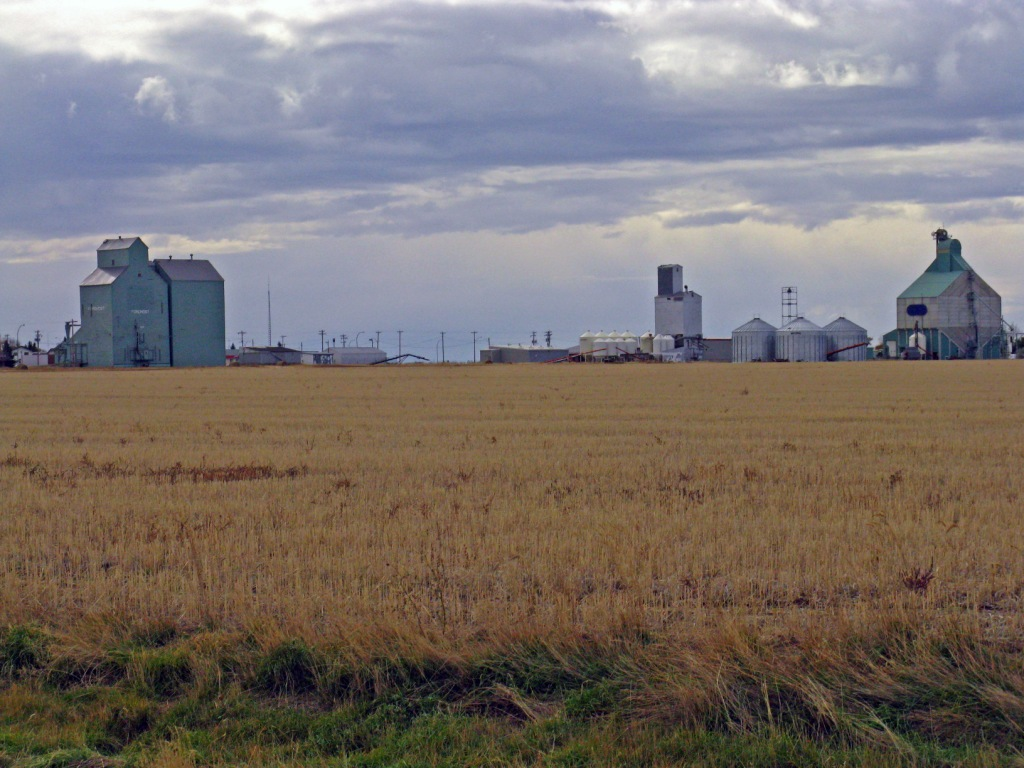
- Grain elevators in Foremost

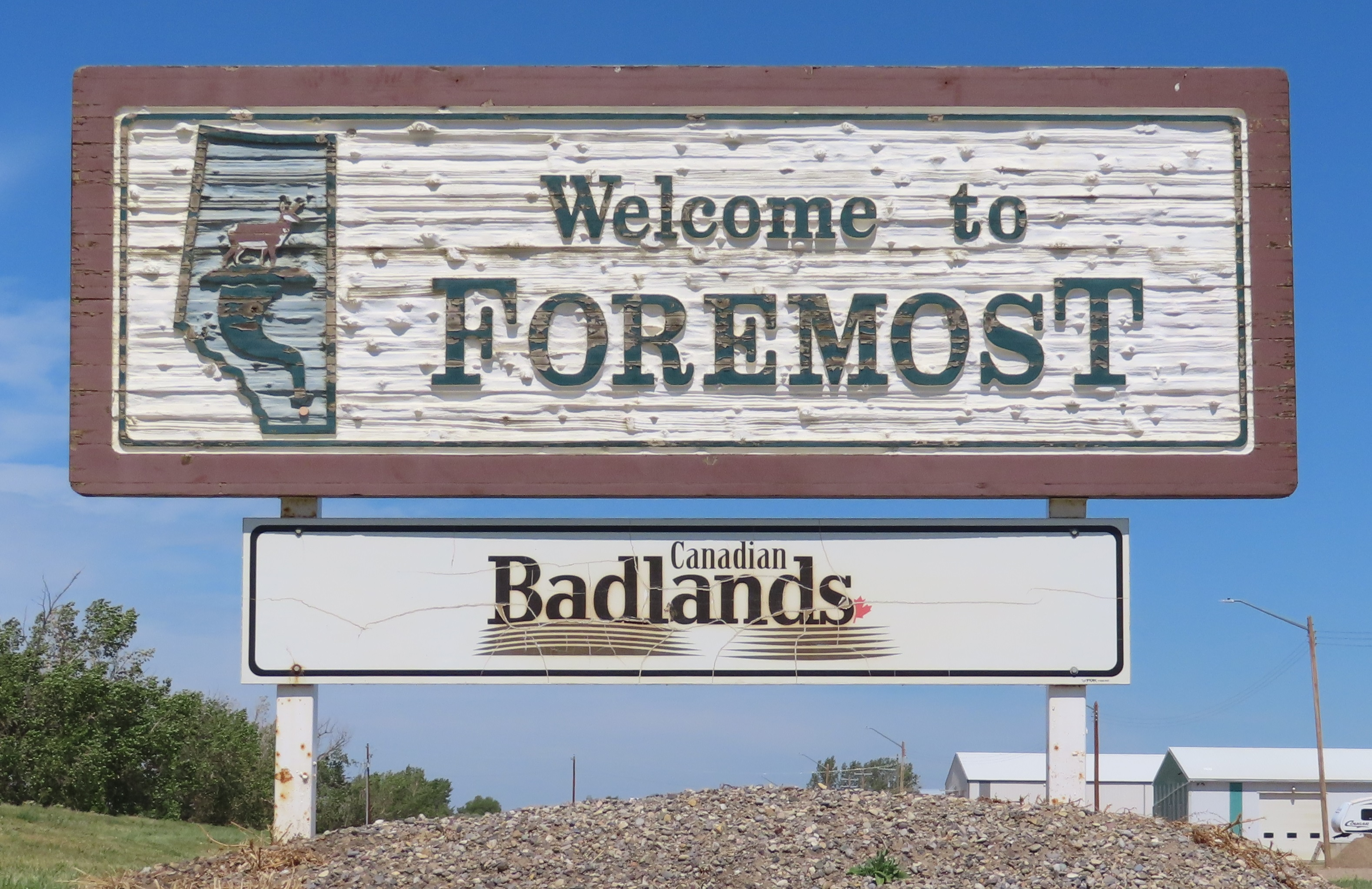
- Welcome sign

- Village boundaries

- Location in County of Forty Mile Location in Alberta
- Coordinates: 49°28′44″N 111°26′25″W
- Country: Canada
- Province: Alberta
- Region: Southern Alberta
- Planning region: South Saskatchewan
- Municipal district: Forty Mile
- Incorporated
  - Village: December 31, 1950

Government
  - Mayor: Vacant
  - Governing body: Foremost Village Council

Area (2021)
  - Land: 2.13 km^{2} (0.82 sq mi)
- Elevation: 889 m (2,917 ft)

Population (2021)
  - Total: 501
- Time zone: UTC−06:00 (Alberta Time)
- Postal code: T0K
- Highways: Highway 61; Highway 879
- Website: www.foremostalberta.com

Foremost is a village in Alberta, Canada. It is located 106 km (66 mi) southwest of Medicine Hat, along the Red Coat Trail, in the County of Forty Mile No. 8.

The industry in Foremost is mainly agricultural. Recreational facilities include an ice arena, swimming pool, curling rink, and baseball diamonds. Fishing, including winter ice fishing, is a popular activity at the Foremost Irrigation Reservoir at the western edge of the village. Every June, the residents hold a parade, rodeo, and a "Tough Truck" competition. Hockey is an important part of the culture in Foremost, with a local minor hockey team called the Foremost Flyers holding multiple provincial and regional titles.

Foremost School, the local K-12 public school, has a long history of successful sports teams. The Foremost Falcons and Forettes have won many provincial titles in basketball, volleyball, track and field and cross country running.

The village also has a strong arts community presenting community theatre as well as a school drama department.

== Geography ==
=== Climate ===
Foremost experiences a semi-arid climate (Köppen climate classification BSk).

Climate data for Foremost, Alberta
Month	Jan	Feb	Mar	Apr	May	Jun	Jul	Aug	Sep	Oct	Nov	Dec	Year
Record high °C (°F)	19.1 (66.4)	22.0 (71.6)	27.0 (80.6)	31.1 (88.0)	35.0 (95.0)	38.9 (102.0)	41.1 (106.0)	40.6 (105.1)	36.7 (98.1)	32.2 (90.0)	25.0 (77.0)	17.8 (64.0)	41.1 (106.0)
Mean daily maximum °C (°F)	−1.0 (30.2)	1.6 (34.9)	6.4 (43.5)	13.6 (56.5)	18.9 (66.0)	23.0 (73.4)	26.8 (80.2)	26.8 (80.2)	20.5 (68.9)	13.7 (56.7)	4.2 (39.6)	−0.4 (31.3)	12.8 (55.0)
Daily mean °C (°F)	−7.0 (19.4)	−4.8 (23.4)	0.0 (32.0)	6.4 (43.5)	11.6 (52.9)	15.8 (60.4)	18.8 (65.8)	18.7 (65.7)	12.8 (55.0)	6.5 (43.7)	−1.8 (28.8)	−6.3 (20.7)	5.9 (42.6)
Mean daily minimum °C (°F)	−13.1 (8.4)	−11.1 (12.0)	−6.4 (20.5)	−0.8 (30.6)	4.3 (39.7)	8.6 (47.5)	10.8 (51.4)	10.6 (51.1)	5.2 (41.4)	−0.7 (30.7)	−7.7 (18.1)	−12.3 (9.9)	−1.1 (30.0)
Record low °C (°F)	−42.0 (−43.6)	−40.0 (−40.0)	−35.0 (−31.0)	−22.2 (−8.0)	−11.1 (12.0)	−9.4 (15.1)	−5.6 (21.9)	−1.1 (30.0)	−12.2 (10.0)	−28.0 (−18.4)	−38.0 (−36.4)	−43.3 (−45.9)	−43.3 (−45.9)
Average precipitation mm (inches)	19.8 (0.78)	13.7 (0.54)	29.0 (1.14)	26.0 (1.02)	55.1 (2.17)	73.0 (2.87)	39.7 (1.56)	40.2 (1.58)	44.0 (1.73)	17.4 (0.69)	18.3 (0.72)	19.7 (0.78)	396.0 (15.59)
Average rainfall mm (inches)	0.1 (0.00)	0.0 (0.0)	3.2 (0.13)	17.1 (0.67)	49.4 (1.94)	73.0 (2.87)	39.7 (1.56)	39.8 (1.57)	43.6 (1.72)	12.1 (0.48)	1.3 (0.05)	0.6 (0.02)	279.9 (11.02)
Average snowfall cm (inches)	19.7 (7.8)	13.7 (5.4)	25.8 (10.2)	8.9 (3.5)	5.7 (2.2)	0.0 (0.0)	0.0 (0.0)	0.3 (0.1)	0.4 (0.2)	5.4 (2.1)	17.0 (6.7)	19.1 (7.5)	116.1 (45.7)
Source: Environment Canada

== Demographics ==
In the 2021 Census of Population conducted by Statistics Canada, the Village of Foremost had a population of 501 living in 212 of its 222 total private dwellings, a change of −7.4% from its 2016 population of 541. With a land area of 2.13 km^{2} (0.82 sq mi), it had a population density of 235.2/km^{2} (609.2/sq mi) in 2021.

In the 2016 Census of Population conducted by Statistics Canada, the Village of Foremost recorded a population of 541 living in 229 of its 257 total private dwellings, a 2.9% change from its 2011 population of 526. With a land area of 2.16 km^{2} (0.83 sq mi), it had a population density of 250.5/km^{2} (648.7/sq mi) in 2016.

== Economy ==
=== Foremost Centre for Unmanned Systems ===
Foremost hosts the Foremost UAS (Unmanned Aircraft Systems) Test Range at the Foremost Aerodrome. Established by the Canadian Centre for Unmanned Vehicle Systems (CCUVS) in 2008, the Foremost Centre supports training for pilots in Beyond Visual Line of Sight (BVLOS) flights - the only one in Canada. The location was selected for reasons including number of sunny days, low population density, flat prairie terrain, low number of dwellings and minimal man-made obstructions. The site's range stretches across the County of 40 Mile, encompassing almost 700 square nautical miles and reaches up to 18,000 feet above sea level.

The site received Transport Canada's approval as Canada's "first permanent restricted airspace for Unmanned Air Systems (UAS, drone)" in November, 2016. Drone Delivery Canada began testing at the site in 2017 with the goal of commercially rolling out drone delivery in 2018.

The community, noted former mayor Ken Kultgen, expects the Centre "will be used by national and international businesses, universities and manufacturing companies."

== See also ==
- List of communities in Alberta
- List of villages in Alberta
- Foremost Formation
- Foremost Airport
