= List of lakes of Alberta =

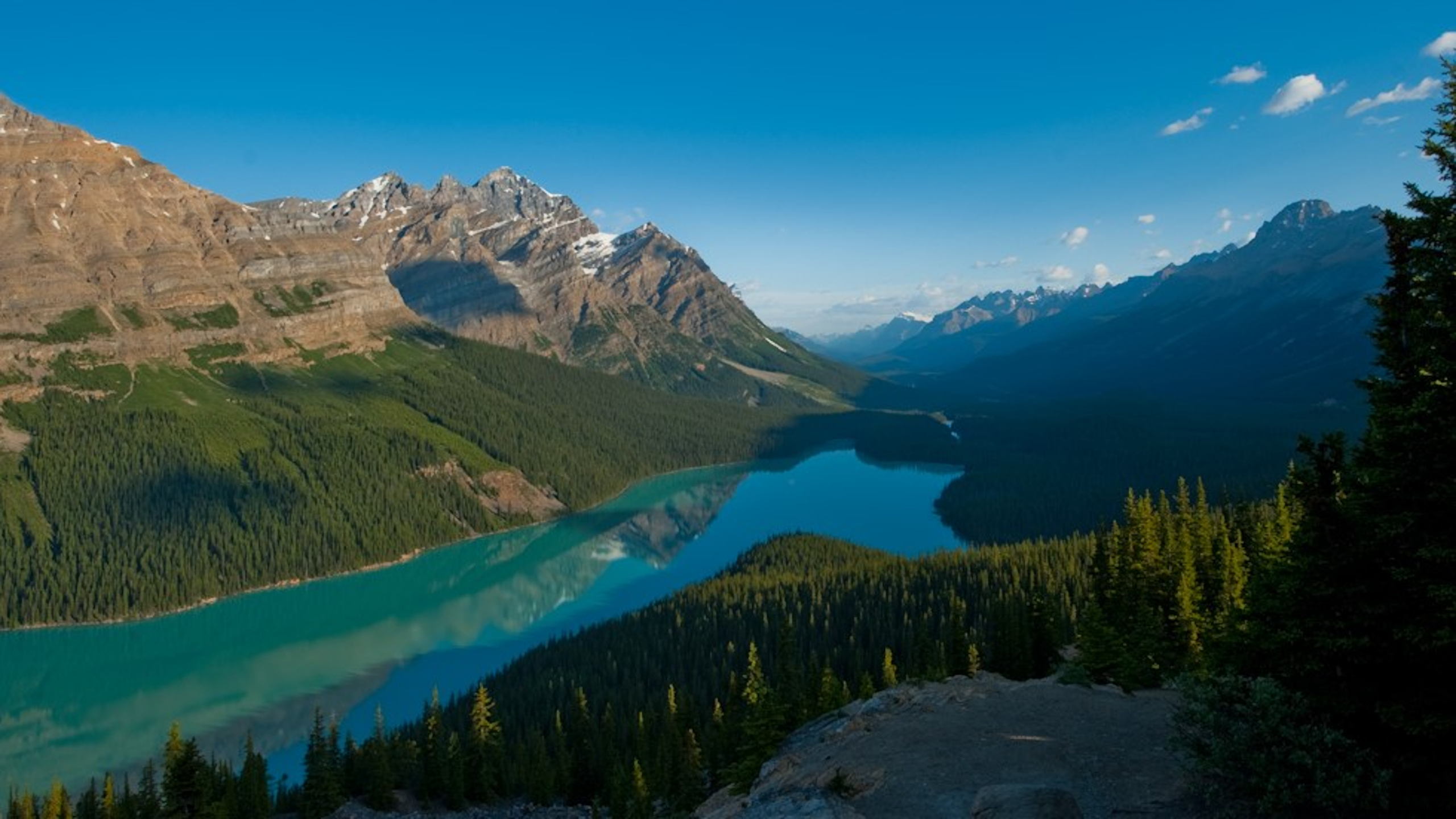
Peyto Lake from lookout

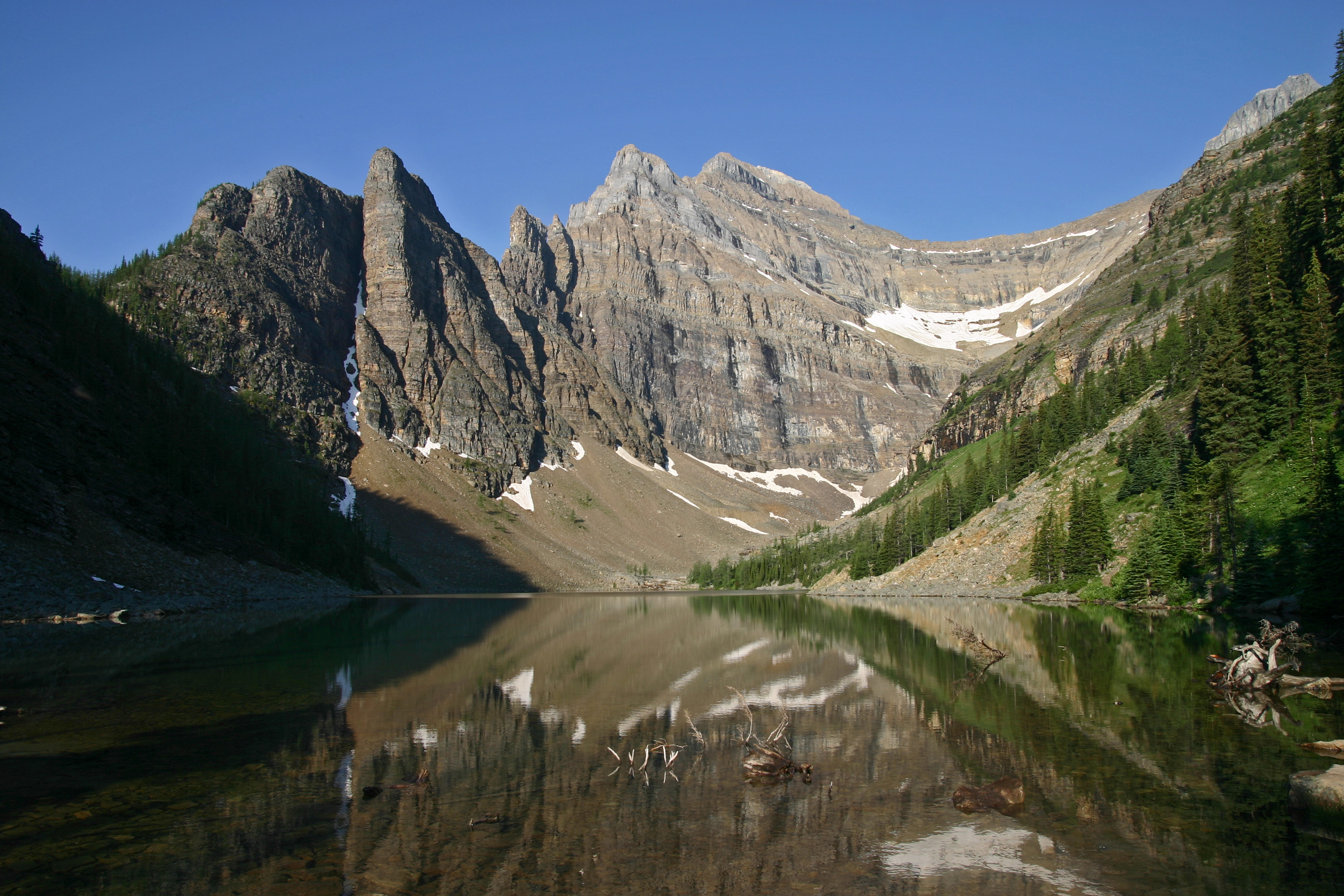
Lake Agnes

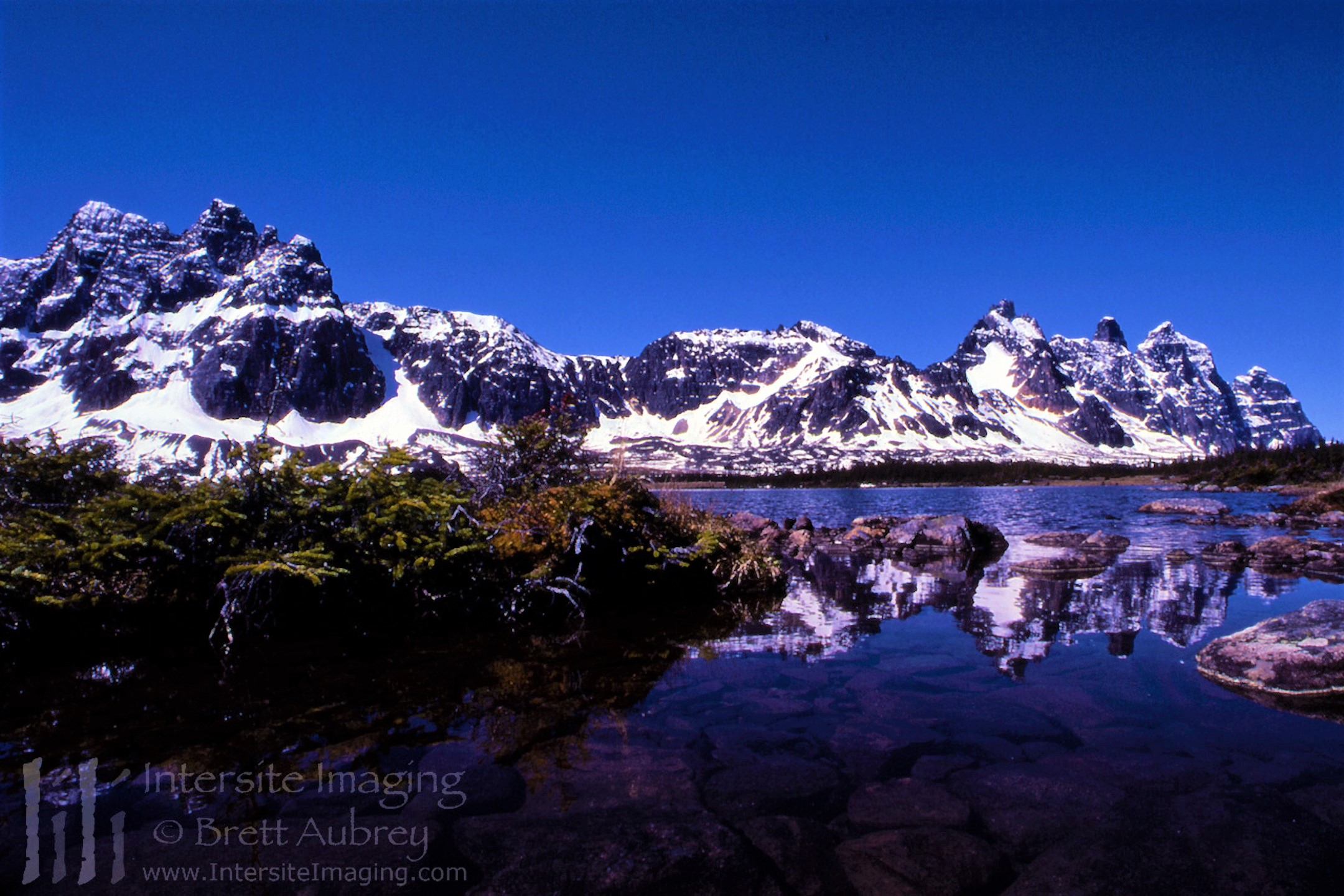
Amethyst Lakes & ramparts

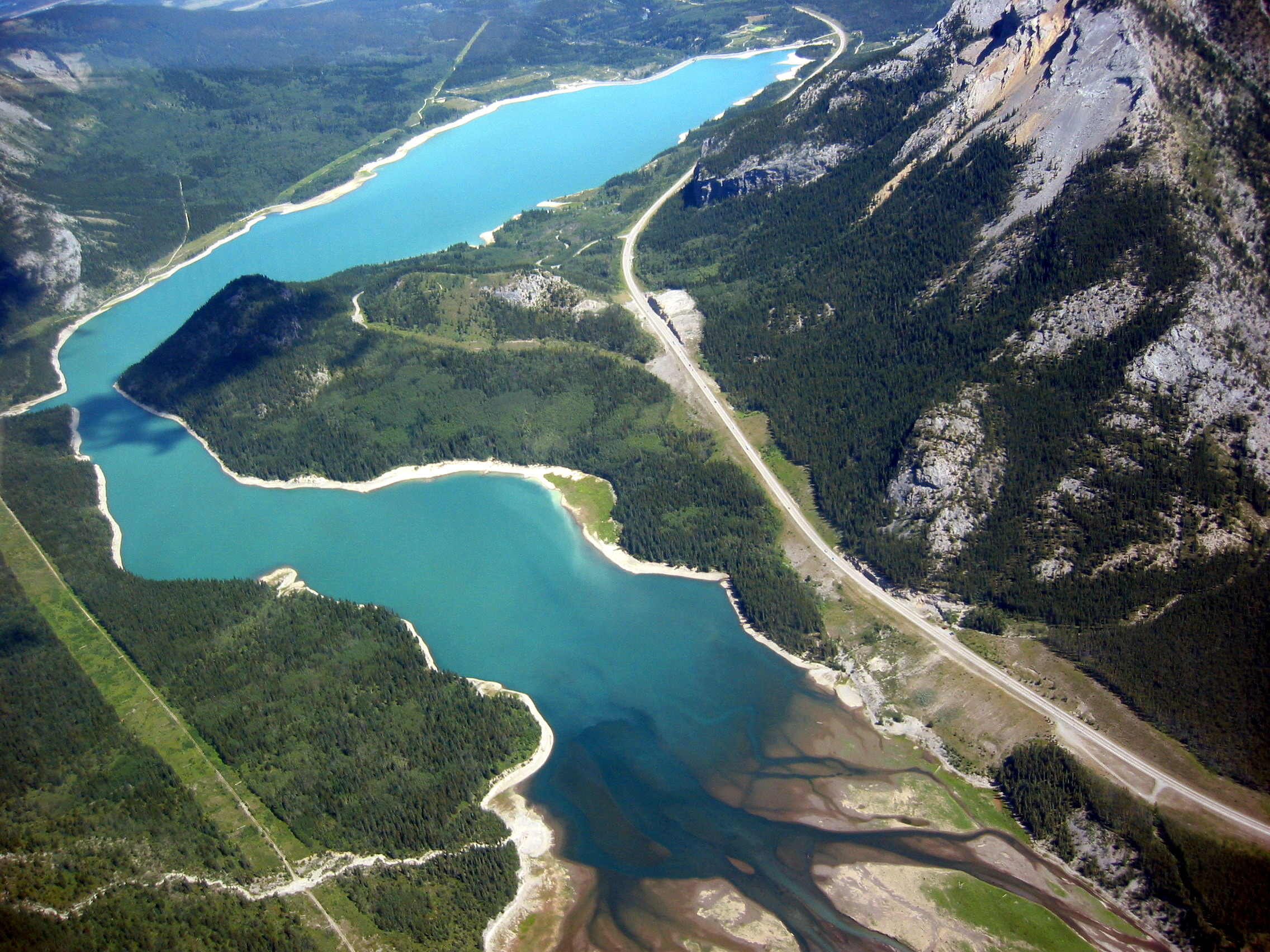
Barrier Lake

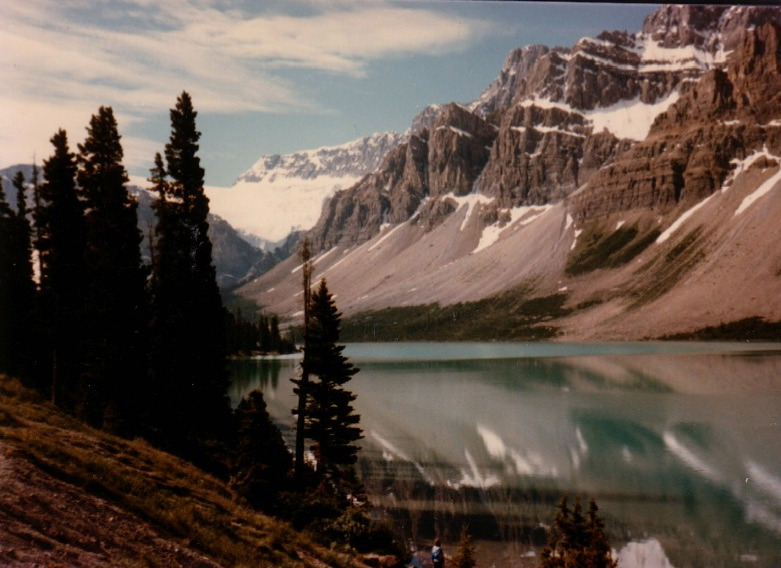
Bow Lake

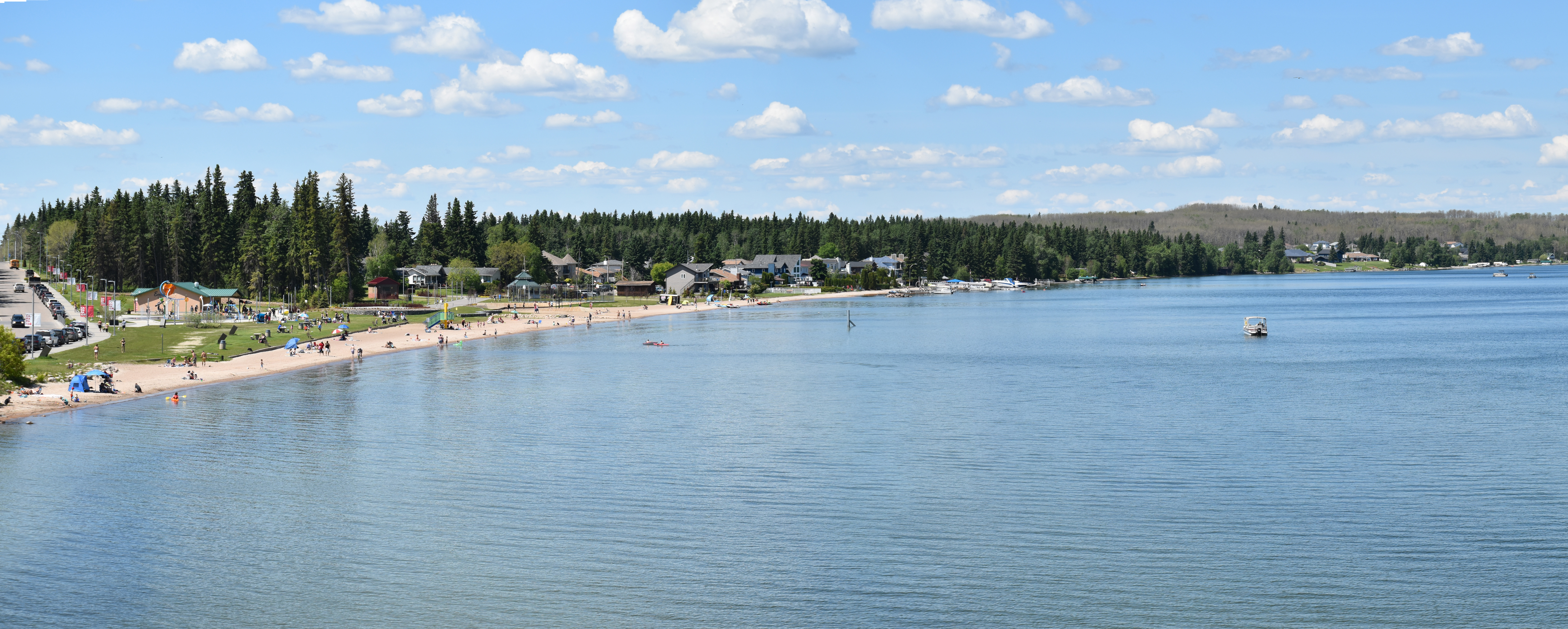
Cold Lake

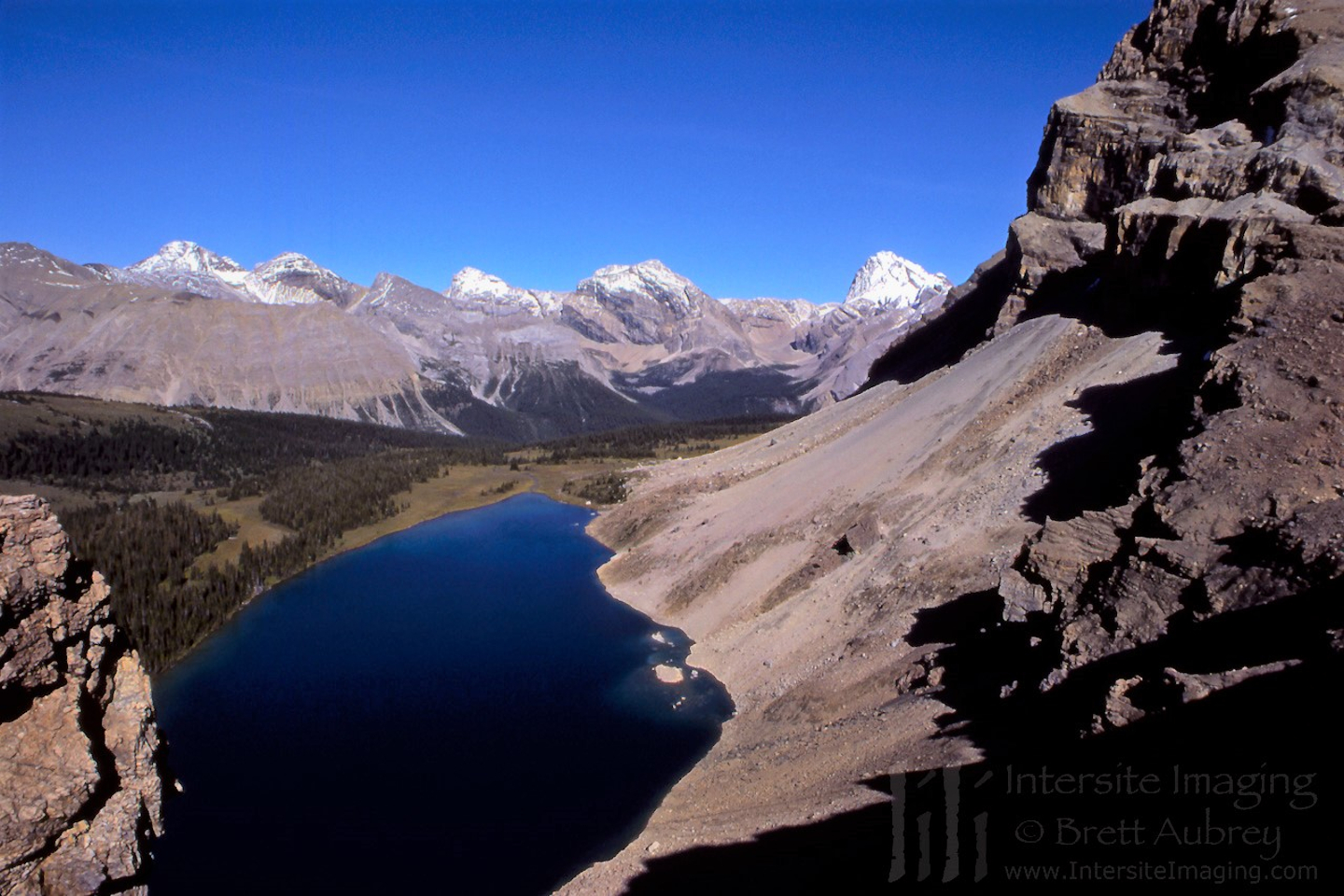
Fish Lakes (1 of 2)

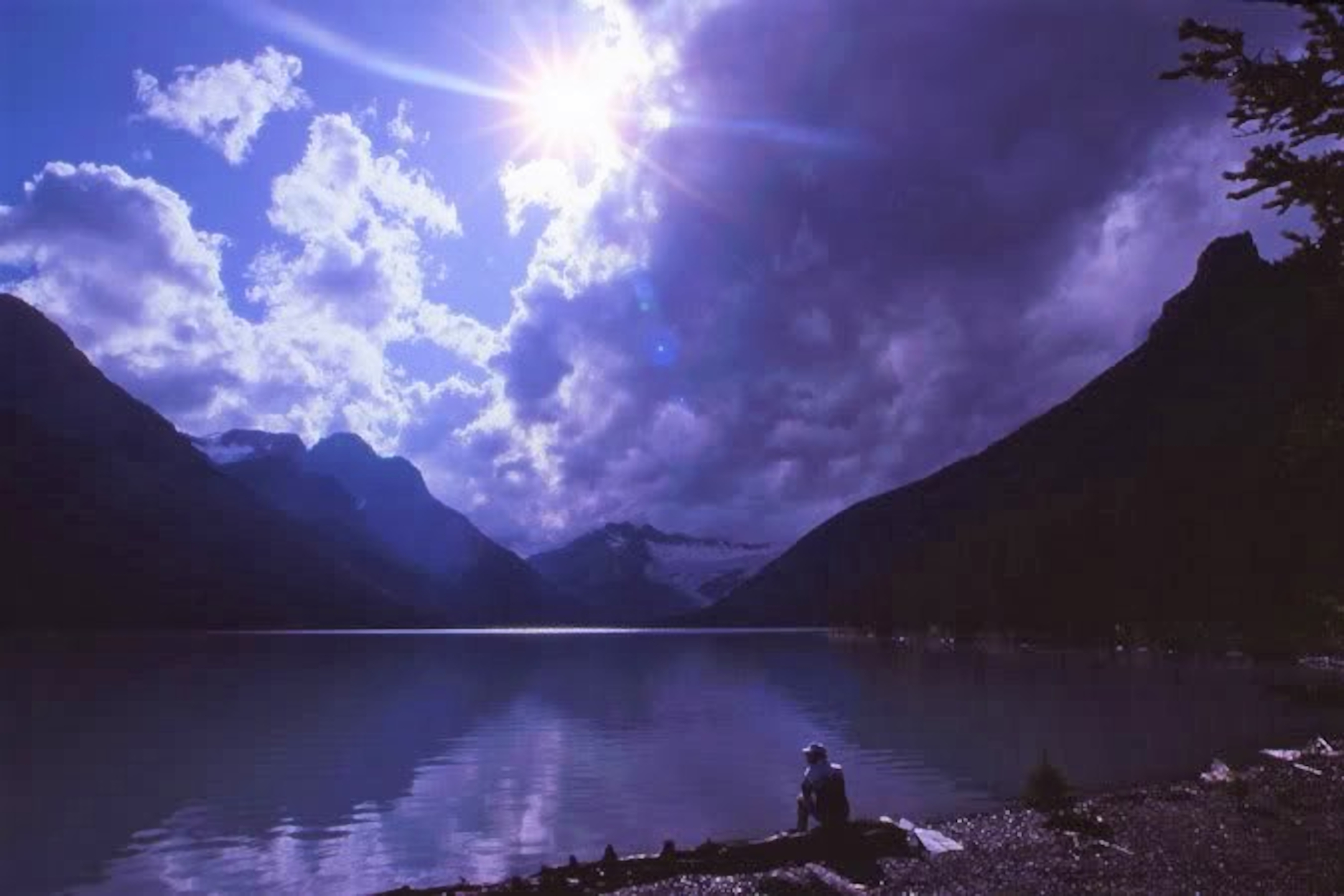
Glacier Lake

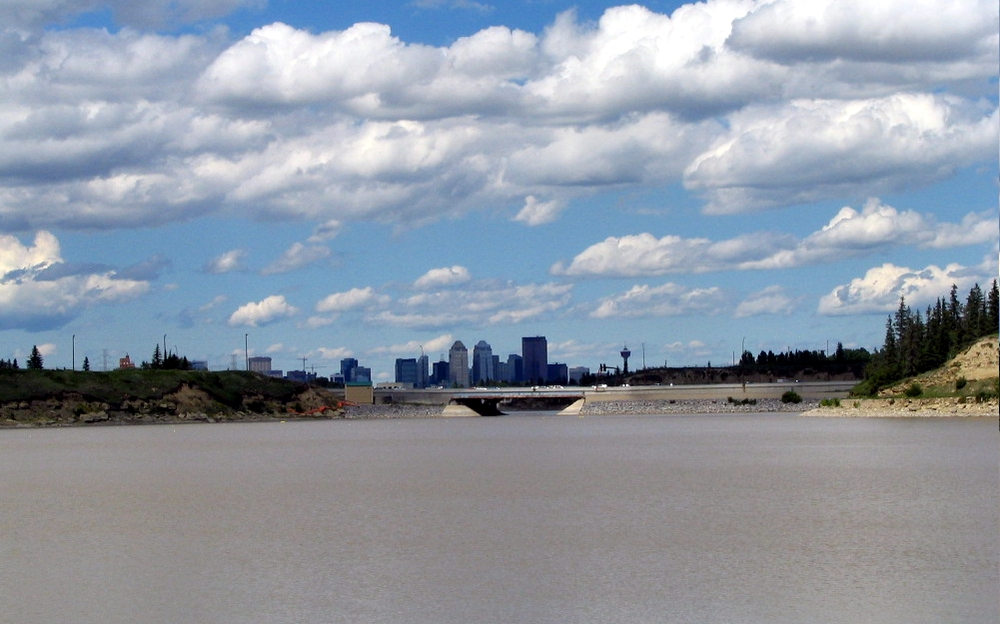
Glenmore Reservoir

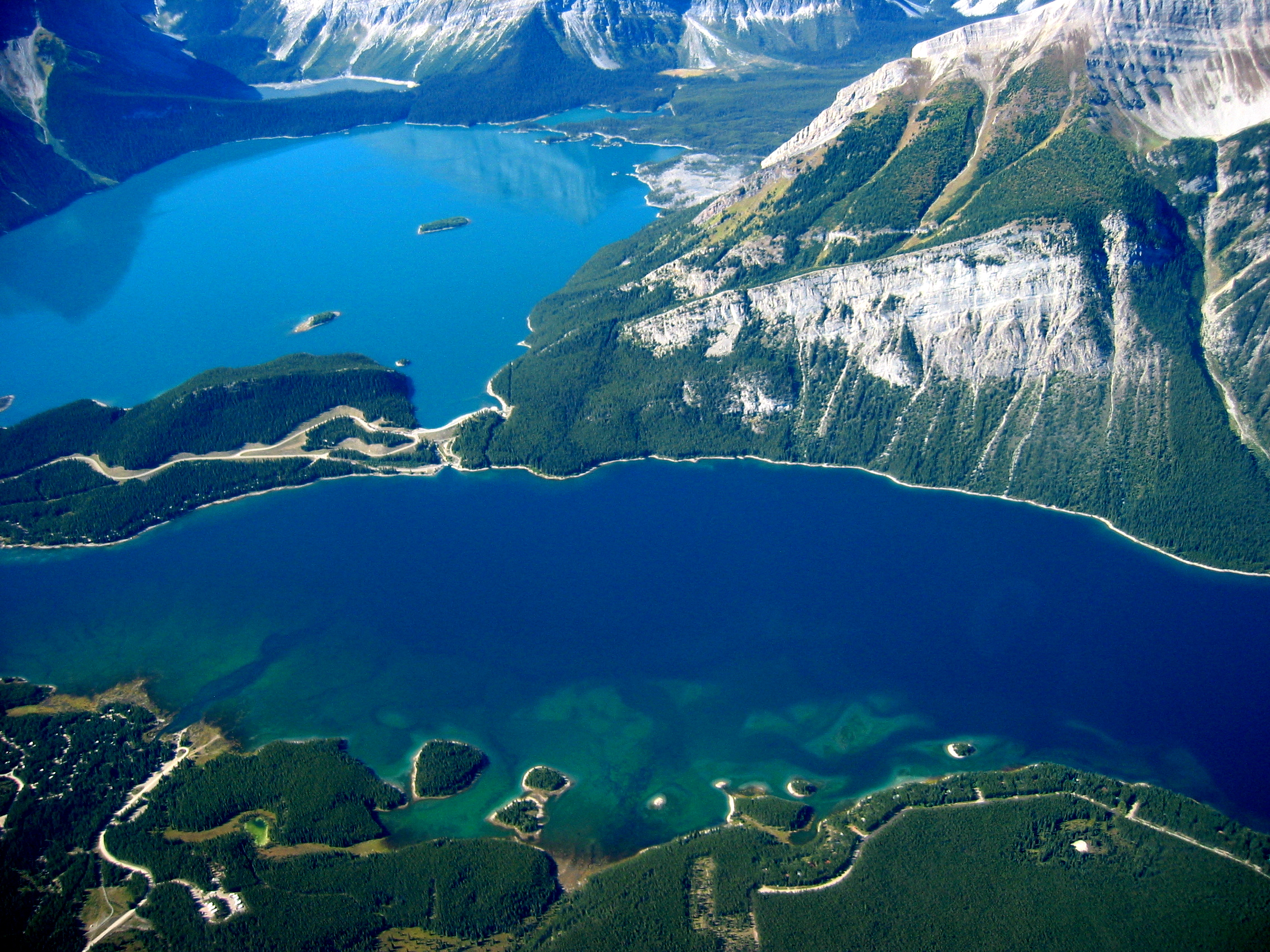
Upper and Lower Kananaskis Lakes

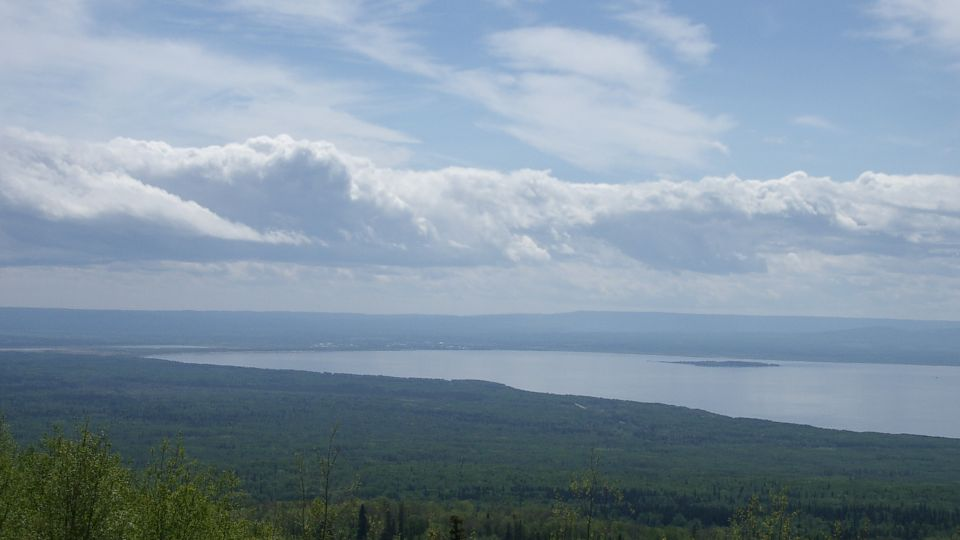
Lesser Slave Lake

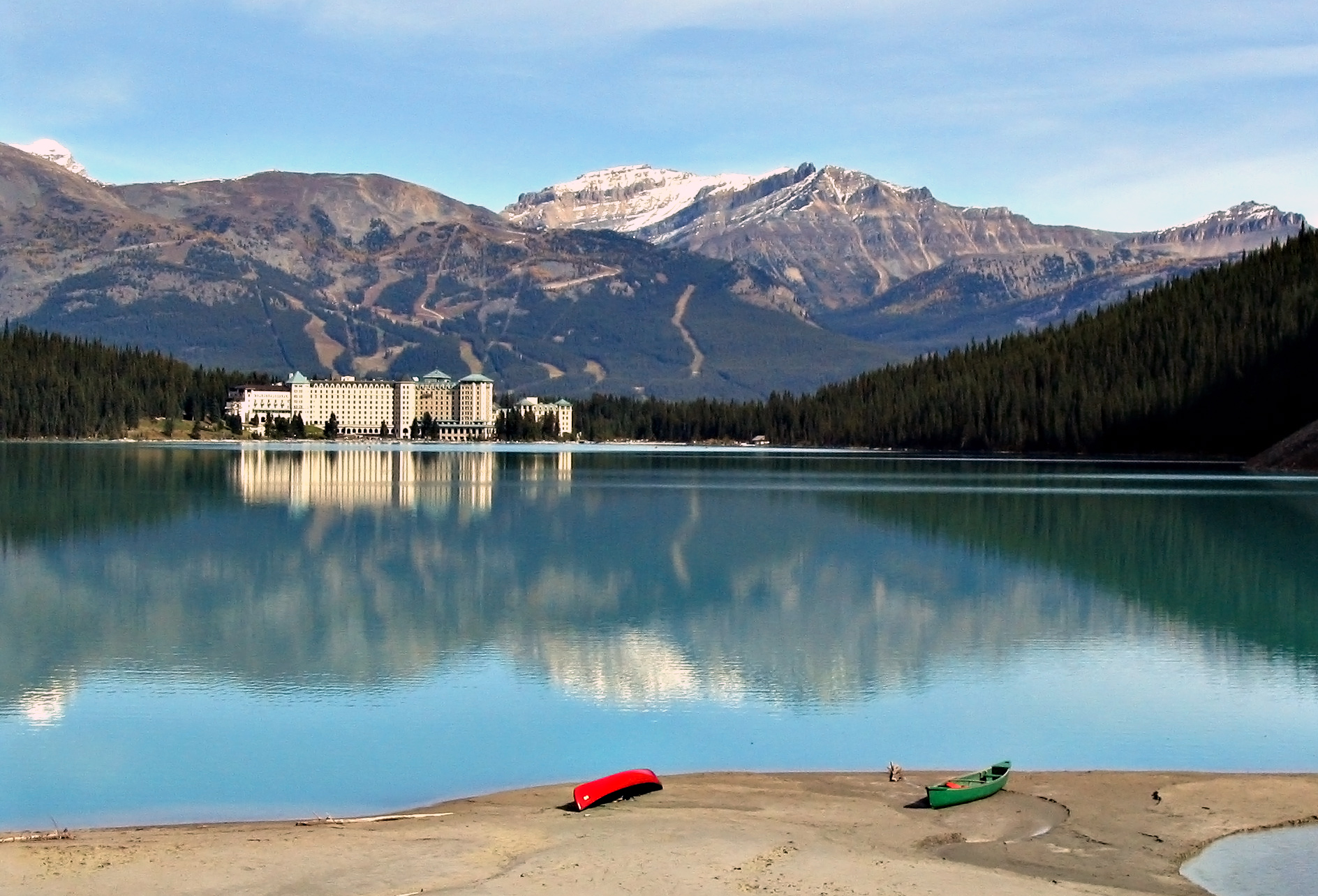
Lake Louise

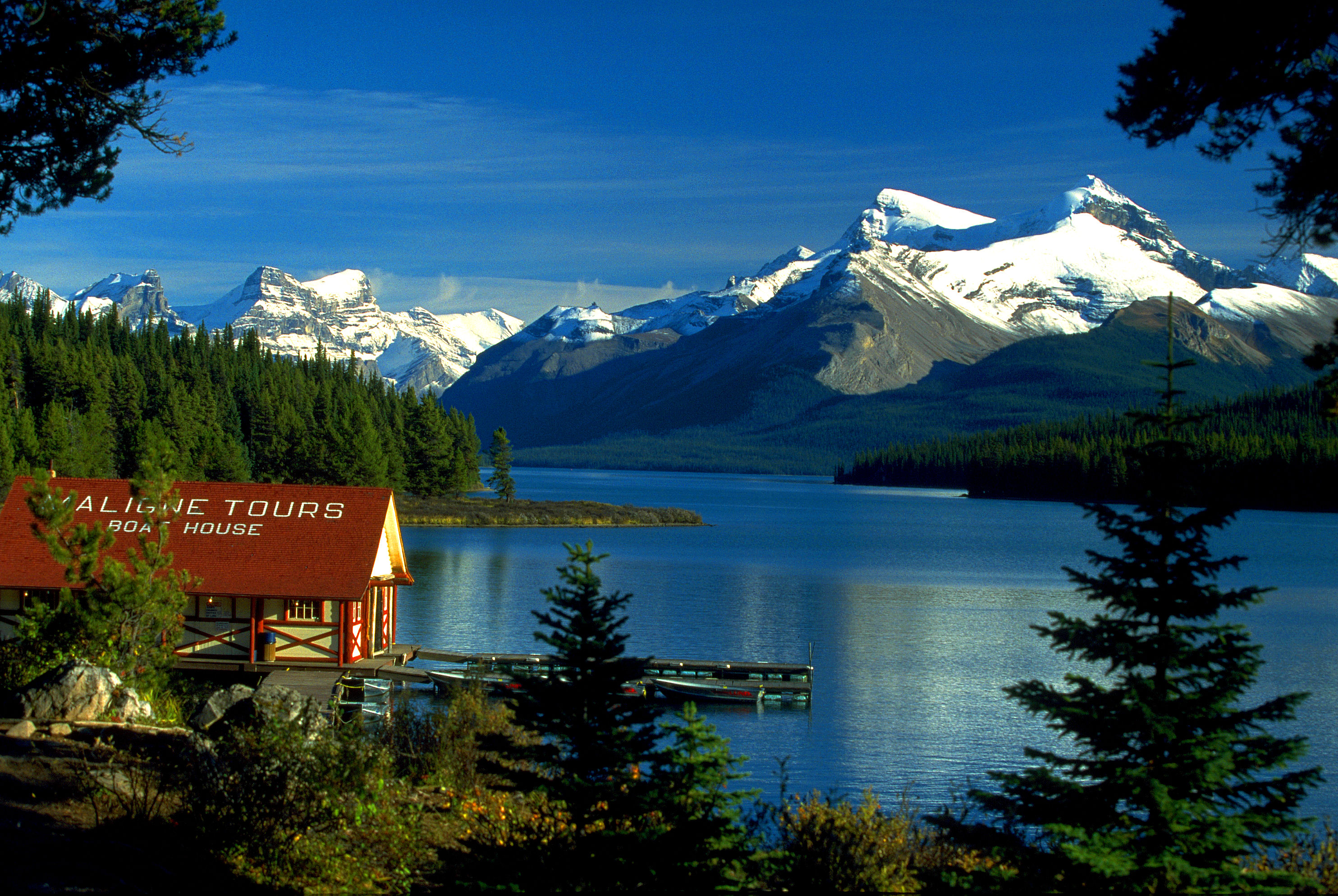
Maligne Lake

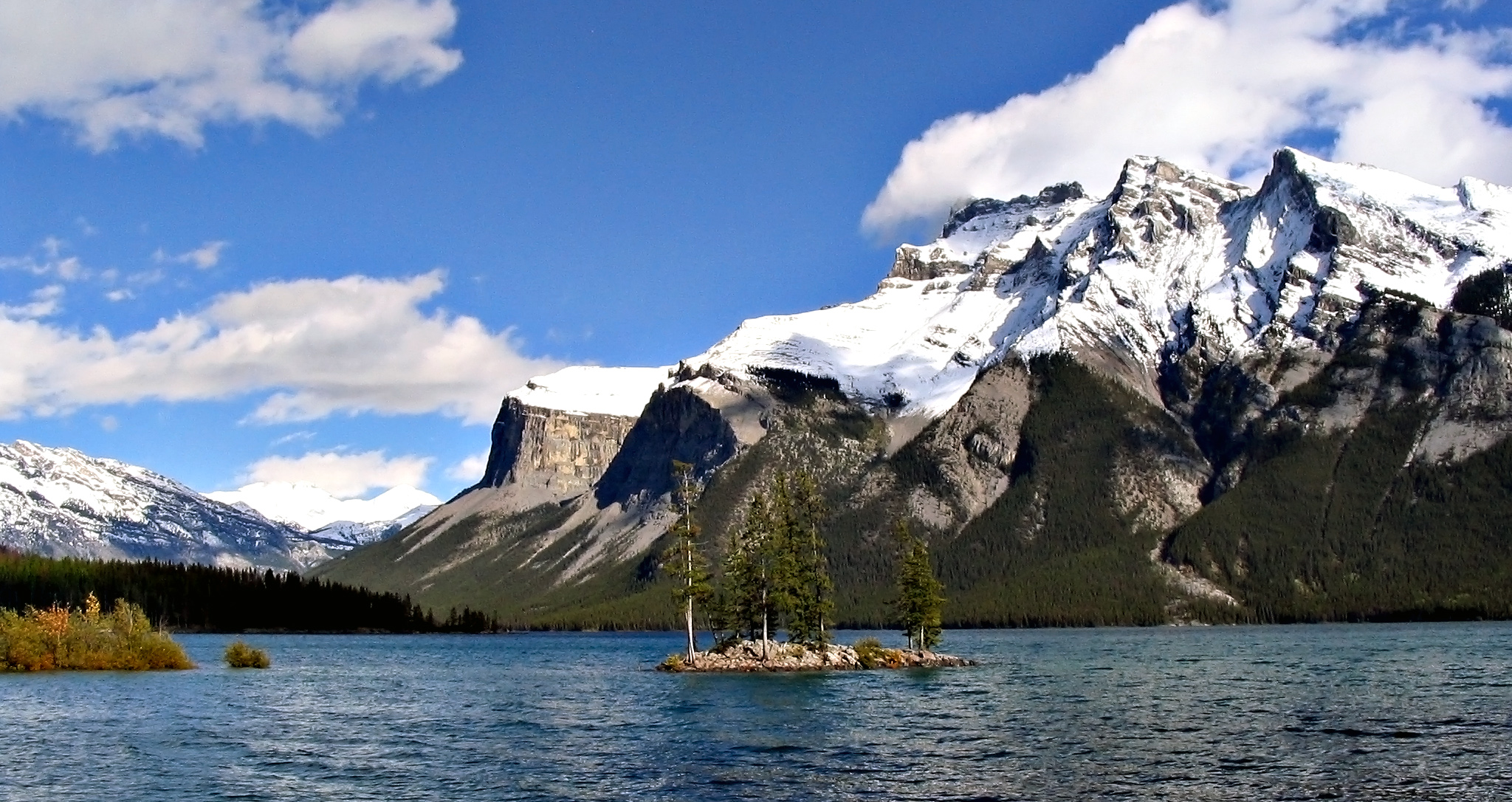
Lake Minnewanka

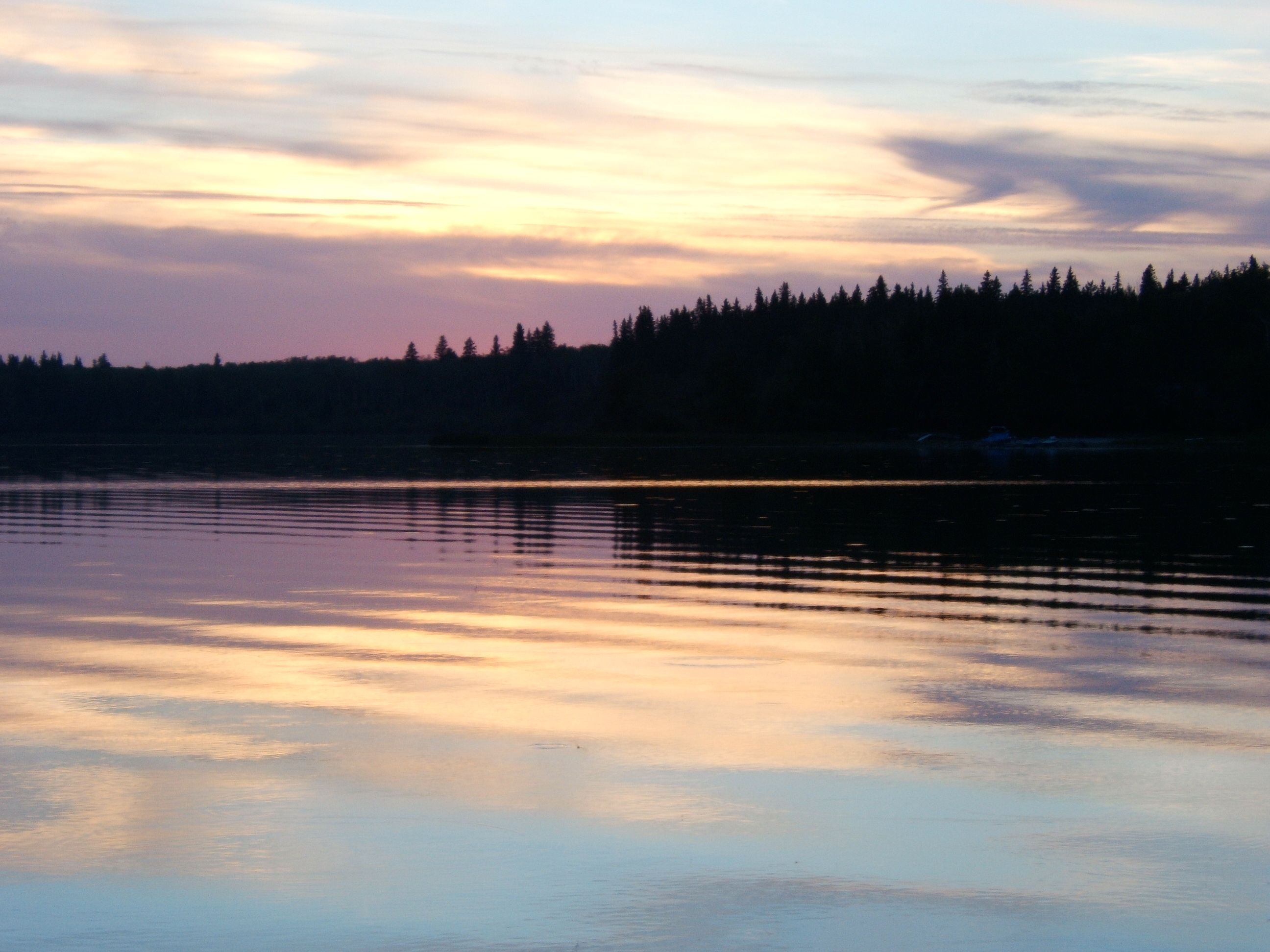
Moose Lake

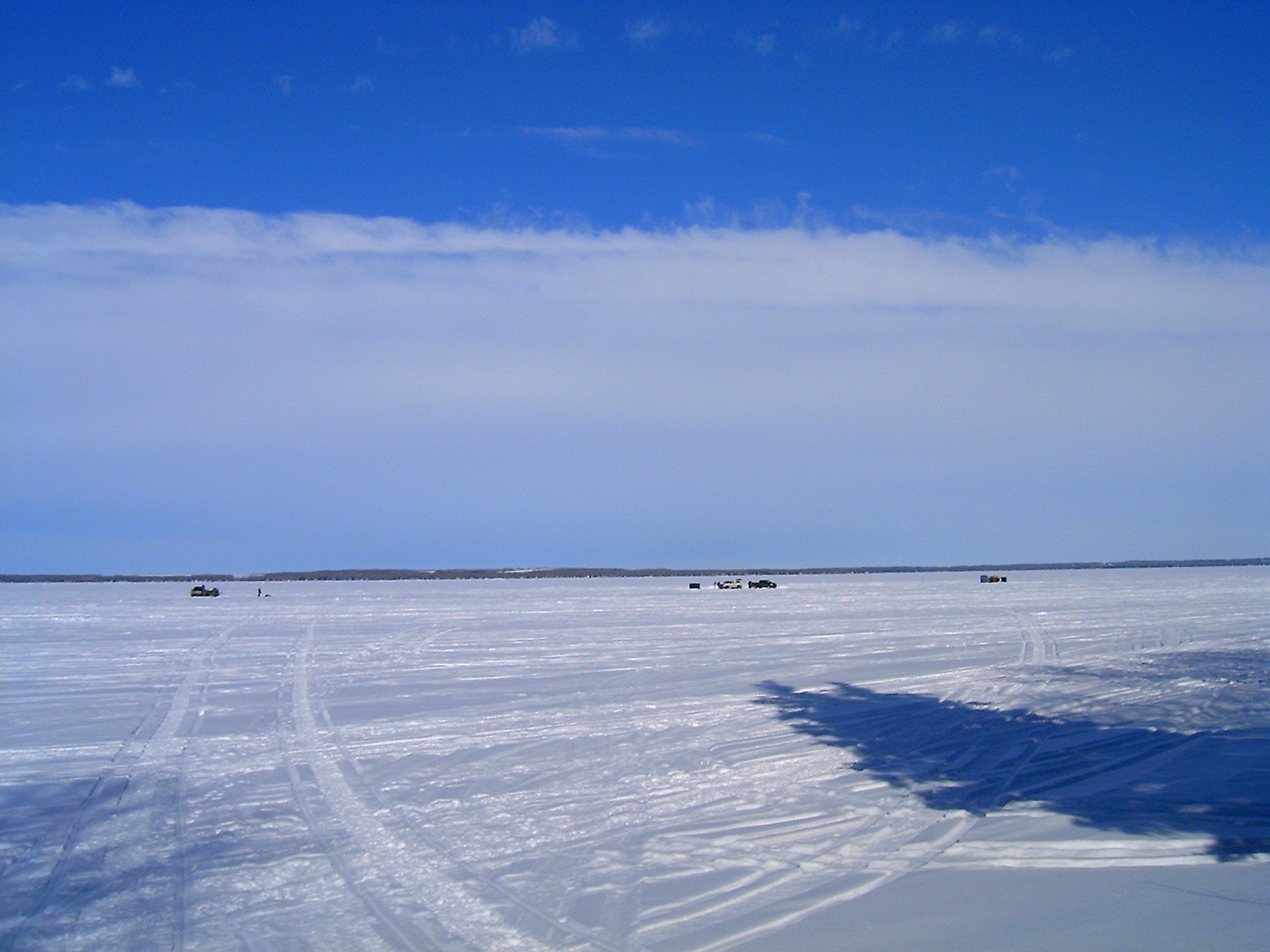
Ice fishing on Pigeon Lake

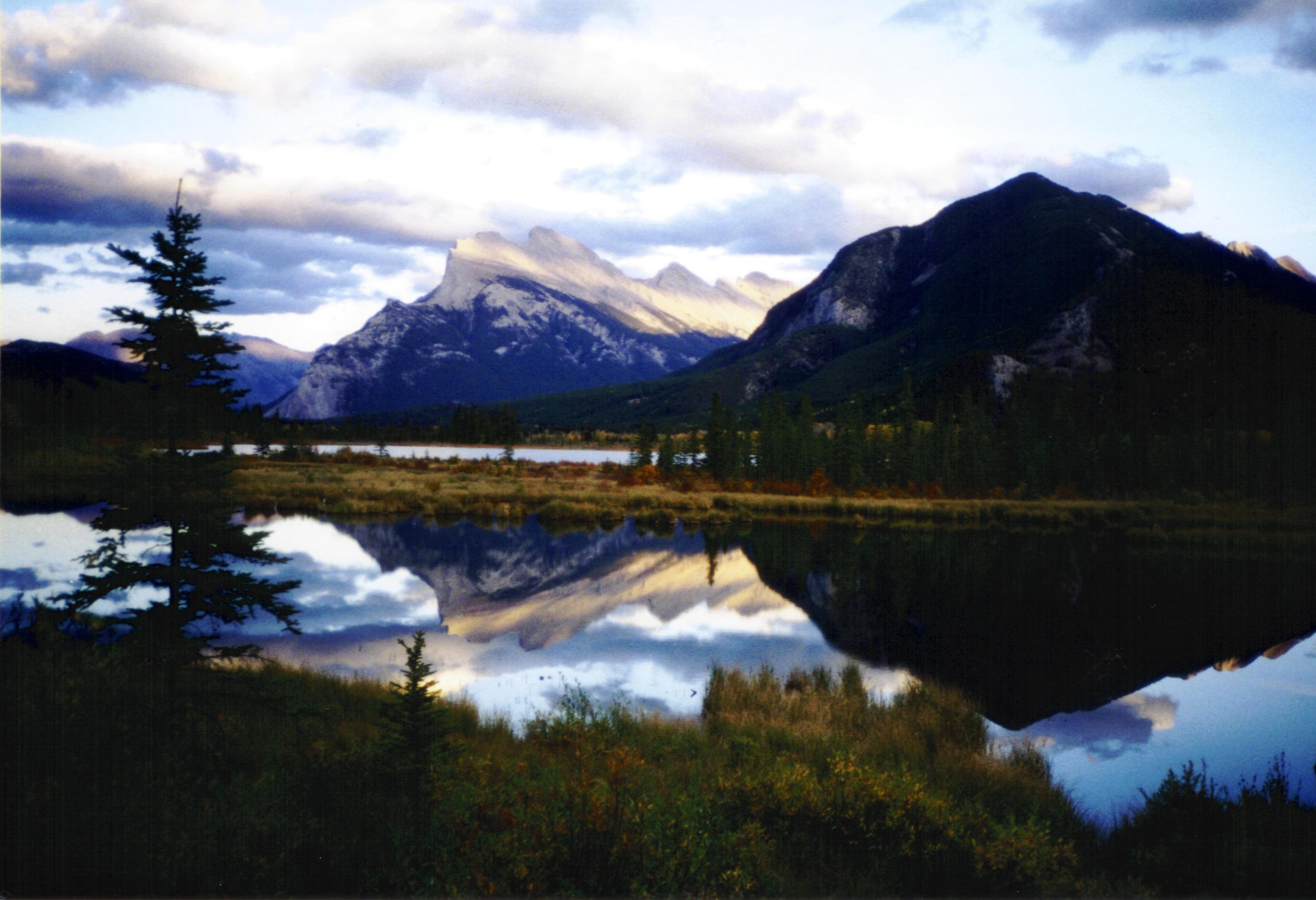
Vermilion Lakes

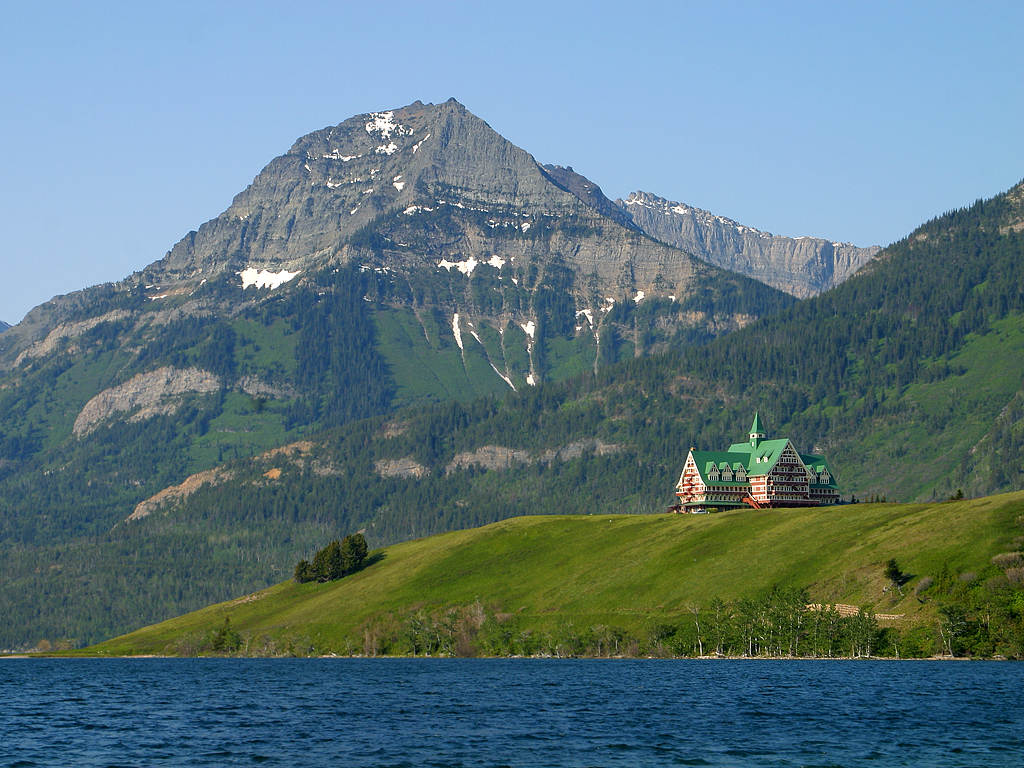
Waterton Lake

This is a list of lakes of Alberta, Canada.

Most of Alberta's lakes were formed during the last glaciation, about 12,000 years ago. There are many different types of lakes in Alberta, from glacial lakes in the Canadian Rockies to small shallow lakes in the prairies, brown water lakes in the northern boreal forest and muskeg, kettle holes and large lakes with sandy beaches and clear water in the central plains.

Distribution of the lakes throughout the province of Alberta is irregular, with many water bodies in the wet boreal plains in the north, and very few in the semi-arid Palliser's Triangle in the southeast.

== River basins ==
Most of Alberta's waters are drained in a general north or northeastern direction, with six major rivers forming four major watersheds collecting the water and removing it from the province:

- The Peace River and Athabasca River flow north and east, meeting in the massive Peace–Athabasca Delta, eventually feeding the Mackenzie River in south-central Northwest Territories and draining into the Arctic Ocean
- The North and South Saskatchewan Rivers flow east and form the Saskatchewan River in central Saskatchewan, flowing into Lake Winnipeg, which drains into Hudson Bay on the Arctic/North Atlantic oceans
  - There is an endorheic area between the North and South Saskatchewan basins, the Sounding Creek system, where most of the water drains to Manitou Lake (not to be confused with the more famous Little Manitou Lake) and evaporates.
- The smaller Beaver River in east-central Alberta flows east into the Churchill River in north-central Saskatchewan and then drains into Hudson Bay
- The smaller Milk River in southeast Alberta flows south into the Missouri River in northeastern Montana, which joins the Mississippi River and drains into the Gulf of Mexico

As with other basins on the planet, the topographical highlights in the drainage divides between these basins can be difficult to discern. For example, there is little elevation change in the short 4 kilometres (2.5 mi) of land between Lac la Biche and Beaver Lake, yet the former is in a watershed that drains north into the Arctic Ocean, while the latter is in a watershed that drains east into Hudson Bay.

== Largest lakes ==
Lake Athabasca is the largest lake in both Alberta and Saskatchewan. This 7,850 km^{2} (3,030 sq mi) lake has 2,295 km^{2} (886 sq mi) of its surface area in Alberta and 5,555 km^{2} (2,145 sq mi) in Saskatchewan.

The largest lake completely within Alberta is Lake Claire, at 1,436 km^{2} (554 sq mi). Lake Claire is just west of Lake Athabasca, with both located in the remote Peace-Athabasca Delta.

This section provides a list of lakes of Alberta with an area larger than 100 km^{2} (39 sq mi).

Alberta lakes larger than 100 km^{2} (39 sq mi)
Lake	Area (including islands)	Elevation	Depth max.	Volume
Lake Athabasca	7,850 km^{2} (3,030 sq mi)	213 m (699 ft)	124 m (407 ft)	204 km^{3} (49 cu mi)
Lake Claire	1,436 km^{2} (554 sq mi)	213 m (699 ft)		
Lesser Slave Lake	1,160 km^{2} (450 sq mi)	578 m (1,896 ft)	20.5 m (67 ft)	13.69 km^{3} (3.28 cu mi)
Bistcho Lake	426 km^{2} (164 sq mi)	552 m (1,811 ft)	6.7 m (22 ft)	
Cold Lake	373 km^{2} (144 sq mi)	535 m (1,755 ft)	99.1 m (325 ft)	18.6 km^{3} (4.5 cu mi)
Utikuma Lake	288 km^{2} (111 sq mi)	641 m (2,103 ft)	5.5 m (18 ft)	
Lac la Biche	234 km^{2} (90 sq mi)	544 m (1,785 ft)	21.3 m (70 ft)	
Beaverhill Lake	139 km^{2} (54 sq mi)	668 m (2,192 ft)	2.3 m (7.5 ft)	
Calling Lake	138 km^{2} (53 sq mi)	529 m (1,736 ft)	18.3 m (60 ft)	
Pakowki Lake	123 km^{2} (47 sq mi)	860 m (2,820 ft)		
Winefred Lake	123 km^{2} (47 sq mi)	594 m (1,949 ft)	15.3 m (50 ft)	

== List of lakes ==
This section provides a list of numerous lakes of Alberta, including the "large" ones shown in the previous section.

Note that the lakes are listed alphabetically by their main name, dropping any leading "lake", "lac", "lac la", "upper/lower", "north/south". For example, Lac la Nonne (the nun lake) is entered under "N". If desired, using the table sort function will give the list sorted by the leading word.

Lake	Watershed	Basin	Area (km^{2})	Remarks
Abraham Lake	North Saskatchewan River	Hudson Bay	53.7	man-made reservoir
Adolphus Lake	Smoky River	Arctic Ocean	0.18	a contributing headwater mountain glacial lake
Lake Agnes	Bow River	Hudson Bay	0.52	a contributing headwater mountain glacial lake
Amisk Lake	Beaver River	Hudson Bay	5.3	
Angle Lake	North Saskatchewan River	Hudson Bay		
Lake Annette	Athabasca River	Arctic Ocean		a contributing headwater mountain glacial lake
Lake Athabasca	Slave River	Arctic Ocean	7,850	two thirds in Saskatchewan
Baptiste Lake	Athabasca River	Arctic Ocean	9.8	
Barreyre Lake	•	•	•	•
Barrier Lake	Kananaskis River	Hudson Bay	2.6	man-made reservoir
Battle Lake	Battle River	Hudson Bay	4.6	
Baxter Lakes	•	•	•	•
Bearhills Lake	Battle River	Hudson Bay		
Beauvais Lake	Oldman River	Hudson Bay	0.9	
Beauvert Lake	Athabasca River	Arctic Ocean	0.4	
Beaver Lake	Beaver River	Hudson Bay	33.1	
Beaverhill Lake	North Saskatchewan River	Hudson Bay	139	Beaverhill Natural Area is part of Western Hemisphere Shorebird Reserve Network.
Lac la Biche	Beaver River	Hudson Bay	236	
Big Lake	Sturgeon River	Hudson Bay	21.4	
Bistcho Lake	Petitot River	Arctic Ocean	426	
Bonnie Lake	North Saskatchewan River	Hudson Bay	3.77	
Bourgeau Lake				
Bow Lake	Bow River	Hudson Bay	3.21	a contributing headwater mountain glacial lake
Brander Lake	•	•	•	•
Brokenleg Lake	•	•	•	•
Buck Lake	North Saskatchewan River	Hudson Bay	25.4	
Brûlé Lake	Athabasca River	Arctic Ocean	14.5	lake is formed along the Athabasca River
Buffalo Lake	Red Deer River	Hudson Bay	93.5	
Calling Lake	Athabasca River	Arctic Ocean	134	
Cardinal Lake	Peace River	Arctic Ocean	50	
Chester Lake	Spray River	Hudson Bay	0.51	a contributing headwater mountain glacial lake
Chestermere Lake	Bow River	Hudson Bay	2.7	man-made reservoir
Chip Lake	Lobstick River	Arctic Ocean	73	
Christina Lake	Athabasca River	Arctic Ocean	21.3	
Lake Claire	Peace River	Arctic Ocean	1,436	largest lake completely in Alberta
Coal Lake	Battle River	Hudson Bay	10.9	ribbon lake
Cold Lake	Beaver River	Hudson Bay	373	partly in Saskatchewan
Crawling Valley Reservoir	South Saskatchewan River	Hudson Bay	25.1	man-made reservoir
Dowling Lake	•	•	•	•
Driedmeat Lake	Battle River	Hudson Bay	16.5	ribbon lake
Elbow Lake	Elbow River	Hudson Bay	0.53	
Elkwater Lake	South Saskatchewan River	Hudson Bay	2.31	
Ethel Lake	Cold River	Hudson Bay		
Ewing Lake	•	•	•	•
Formby Lake	•	•	•	•
Frank Lake	South Saskatchewan River	Hudson Bay	43.74	
Gadsby Lake	•	•	•	•
Ghost Lake	Bow River	Hudson Bay	11.6	man-made reservoir
Glacier Lake	North Saskatchewan River	Hudson Bay	2.5	a contributing headwater mountain glacial lake
Gleniffer Lake	Red Deer River	Hudson Bay	17.6	man-made reservoir
Glenmore Reservoir	Elbow River	Hudson Bay	3.8	man-made reservoir
Gull Lake	Red Deer River	Hudson Bay	80.6	
Headwall Lakes	Kananaskis River	Hudson Bay	0.66	contributing headwater mountain glacial lakes (0.45+0.21 km^{2})
Hector Lake	Bow River	Hudson Bay	5.23	a contributing headwater mountain glacial lake
Hidden Lake	Bow River	Hudson Bay	0.4	a contributing headwater mountain glacial lake
Hoselaw Lake	North Saskatchewan River	Hudson Bay	0.4	
Hutch Lake	•	•	•	•
Ipiatik Lake	•	•	•	•
Isle Lake	North Saskatchewan River	Hudson Bay	23	known locally as Lake Isle
Jessie Lake	Beaver River	Hudson Bay	5.5	
Kinikinik Lake	Peace River	Arctic Ocean		
Lower Kananaskis Lake	Kananaskis River	Hudson Bay	6.0	original lake expanded as man-made reservoir
Upper Kananaskis Lake	Kananaskis River	Hudson Bay	8.4	original lake expanded as man-made reservoir
Lessard Lake	•	•	3.21	•
Lesser Slave Lake	Lesser Slave River	Arctic Ocean	1,160	second largest lake completely in Alberta
Lake Louise	Bow River	Hudson Bay	0.8	a contributing headwater mountain glacial lake
Maligne Lake	Athabasca River	Arctic Ocean	19.7	a contributing headwater mountain glacial lake
Lower Mann Lake	Beaver River	closed basin	5.10	
Upper Mann Lake	Beaver River	closed basin	4.59	
McGregor Lake	Bow River	Hudson Bay	51.4	reservoir
Medicine Lake	Athabasca River	Arctic Ocean	3.7	
Milk Reservoir	Milk River	Gulf of Mexico	14	man-made reservoir
Lake Minnewanka	Bow River	Hudson Bay	21.5	a contributing headwater mountain glacial lake enlarged by dam
Moose Lake	Beaver River	Hudson Bay	40.8	
Moraine Lake	Bow River	Hudson Bay	0.5	a contributing headwater mountain glacial lake
Muriel Lake	Beaver River	closed basin	64.1	
Musreau Lake	Kakwa River	Hudson Bay	5.49	
Nakamun Lake	Toad Creek	Hudson Bay	3.54	
Lake Newell	Bow River	Hudson Bay	66.4	man-made reservoir
Lac la Nonne	Pembina River	Arctic Ocean	12.28	
Pakowki Lake	Milk River	Gulf of Mexico	123.7	largest lake in Southern Alberta
Peerless Lake	Peace River	Arctic Ocean	82.6	
Peyto Lake	Mistaya River	Hudson Bay	1.4	a contributing headwater mountain glacial lake
Pigeon Lake	Battle River	Hudson Bay	96.7	
Pinehurst Lake	Sand River	Hudson Bay	40.7	
Primrose Lake	Beaver River	Hudson Bay	17.7	most of the lake's surface area 444 km^{2} (171 sq mi) is located in Saskatchewan.
Pyramid Lake	Athabasca River	Arctic Ocean	1.2	
Rattlesnake Lake	South Saskatchewan River	Hudson Bay	10.7	
Red Deer Lake	Battle River	Hudson Bay	21	
Lac Sante		Hudson Bay	10.0	
Saskatoon Lake	Peace River	Arctic Ocean	7.47	
Sikome Lake	Bow River	Hudson Bay	0.4	man-made recreation lake in Calgary
Skeleton Lake	Beaver River	Hudson Bay	7.89	
Sounding Lake	Battle River	Hudson Bay		alkali lake that is part of the Manitou Lake endorheic basin
Spray Lakes	Bow River	Hudson Bay	19.9	man-made reservoir that was previously a string of lakes
Lac Ste. Anne	North Saskatchewan River	Hudson Bay	54.5	
Sauer Lake	•	•	•	•
Steele Lake	Athabasca River	Arctic Ocean	6.61	formerly named Cross Lake because of its shape
Sturgeon Lake	Smoky River	Arctic Ocean	49.1	
Sullivan Lake	Red Deer River	Hudson Bay	77	
Sylvan Lake	Red Deer River	Hudson Bay	42.8	
Telford Lake	North Saskatchewan River	Hudson Bay	13	
Thunder Lake	Athabasca River	Arctic Ocean	7.03	
Touchwood Lake	Beaver River	Hudson Bay	29	
Tucker Lake	•	•	6.65	•
Twin Lake	•	•	24ha	•
Utikuma Lake	Peace River	Arctic Ocean	295	
Vermilion Lakes	Bow River	Hudson Bay	0.48	a string of three lakes along the Bow River
Wabamun Lake	North Saskatchewan River	Hudson Bay	81.8	
North Wabasca Lake	Wabasca River	Arctic Ocean	101.4	
South Wabasca Lake	Wabasca River	Arctic Ocean	61.6	
Waterton Lake	Oldman River	Hudson Bay	11.6	partly in Montana
Willow Lake	Athabasca River	Arctic Ocean	25.8	
Winagami Lake	Athabasca River	Arctic Ocean	46.7	
Winefred Lake	Clearwater River	Arctic Ocean	122.8	
Wizard Lake	North Saskatchewan River	Hudson Bay	2.48	
Wolf Lake	Beaver River	Hudson Bay	31.5	
Zama Lake	Hay River	Arctic Ocean	55.5	

== See also ==
- List of Alberta rivers
- Geography of Alberta
