= Etzikom Coulee =

Landform in southern Alberta, Canada

Location
- Country: Canada

Physical characteristics
- Source
  - location: Stirling Lake
  - coordinates: 49.52894°N 112.54171°W
  - elevation: 930 meters (3,050 ft)
- Mouth
  - location: Pakowki Lake
  - coordinates: 49.38805°N 111.09504°W
  - elevation: 860 meters (2,820 ft)
- Length: ~110 kilometers (68 mi)

Etzikom Coulee is a coulee located in Southern Alberta, Canada.

The waterway was formed as a glacial spillway channel at the end of the last ice age.

== Course ==
The Etzikom Coulee begins northeast of the town of Stirling, and makes its way southeast of the Hamlet of Wrentham, after that it passes by the Hamlet of Skiff into the Crow Indian Lake, then southeast of the Village of Foremost as well as the Hamlet of Nemiskam, and finally ending south of the Hamlet of Etzikom at Pakowki Lake, the largest lake in Southern Alberta.

It flows from an elevation of 930 meters (3,050 ft) at its origin east of Stirling Lake (to which it is connected by the Sluice Gate Channel) to an elevation of 860 meters (2,820 ft) at its mouth at Pakowki Lake, over a length of more than 110 kilometers (68 mi). The coulee builds a canyon up to 40 meters (130 ft) deep.

== See also ==
- List of coulees in Alberta
- List of lakes in Alberta
