= Angle Lake =

Angle Lake may refer to:

- Angle Lake, Alberta, an unincorporated area in Canada
- Angle Lake (Alberta), a lake in Canada
- Angle Lake in Angle Township, Lake of the Woods County, Minnesota, US
- Angle Lake, Washington, in SeaTac, Washington
- Angle Lake station, a rail transit station in SeaTac, Washington
