= Peerless Lake =

Peerless Lake may refer to:

- Peerless Lake (Alberta), a lake within the Municipal District of Opportunity No. 17 in Alberta, Canada
- Peerless Lake, Alberta, an unincorporated community within the Municipal District of Opportunity No. 17 in Alberta, Canada
