= Sounding Lake =

Lake in Alberta, Canada

- Location in Alberta Sounding Lake (Canada)
- Location: Special Area No. 4, Alberta
- Coordinates: 52.1539°N 110.4906°W
- Type: Alkali lake
- Part of: Battle River drainage basin
- Primary inflows: Sounding Creek
- Primary outflows: Eyehill Creek
- Basin countries: Canada
- Max. length: 9.5 km (5.9 mi)
- Surface elevation: 654 m (2,146 ft)
- Settlements: None

Sounding Lake is an alkali lake in the Canadian province of Alberta. It is about 20 kilometres (12 mi) north-east of Consort and 23 kilometres (14 mi) south-west of Provost in Special Area No. 4. The lake, and surrounding landscape, is encompassed by the Sounding Lake (AB030) Important Bird Area (IBA) of Canada. To the north of Sounding Lake are the Parkland Dunes and Neutral Hills.

There is no road access to Sounding Lake, nor are there any communities along its shores. The locality of Sounding Lake is situated just to the south. Cree chief Big Bear signed onto Treaty 6 at the lake.

== Description ==
Sounding Lake is an Alkali lake that during drought years completely dries up. Sounding Creek is the primary inflow while Eyehill Creek is the outflow. Sounding Creek, which flows into the southern end of Sounding Lake and has a drainage basin covering about 10,000 km^{2} (3,900 sq mi), originates in the west east of Sullivan Lake. Eyehill Creek flows out of the eastern end of the lake and east into Saskatchewan where it terminates at Manitou Lake. Manitou Lake has no outflow. While the drainage basins of Sounding Lake and Manitou Lake are considered to be part of the Battle River watershed, the basins are in fact terminal.

Sounding Lake (AB030) Important Bird Area covers 7,717 hectares (19,070 acres) that includes the lake and surrounding shoreline. Birds found at the lake include the piping plover, stilt sandpiper, Baird's sandpiper, sanderling, lesser yellowlegs, American avocet, and peep.

== Treaty 6 ==
Treaty 6, which encompasses Sounding Lake, was the sixth treaty signed by the Crown and various First Nations in Canada. The treaty was first signed on 23 August 1876 at Fort Carlton. Chief Big Bear, who initially believed treaties would not benefit his peoples, held off signing Treaty 6 until 1879. At Sounding Lake, there is a marker commemorating Big Bear's signing and a visit from the governor general of Canada. The marker indicates that there were over 5,000 Cree camped there for the signing of Treaty 6.

== See also ==
- List of lakes of Alberta
