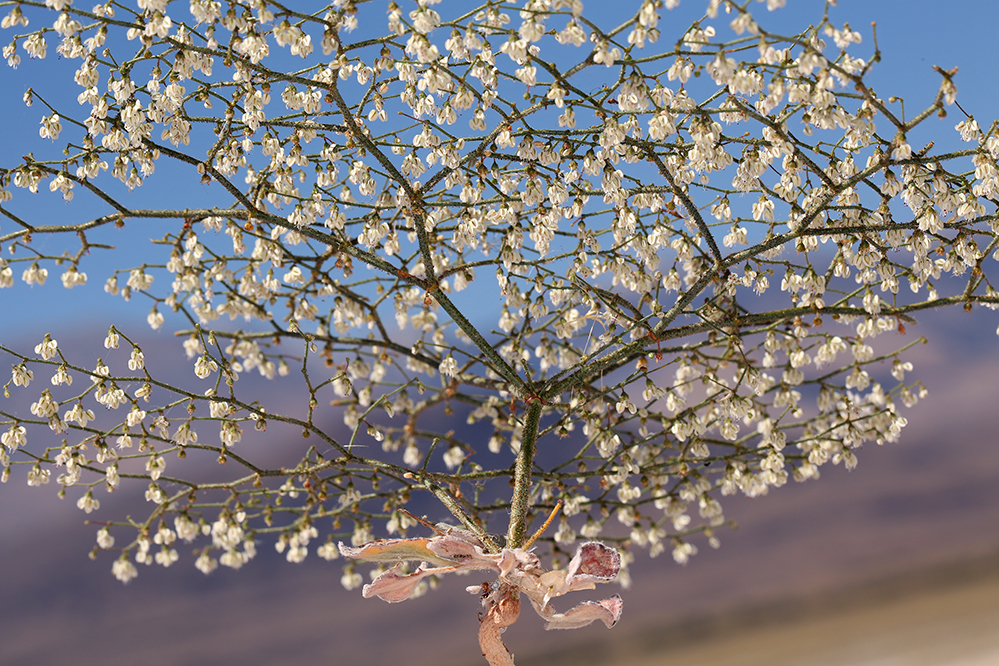

Conservation status
- Secure (NatureServe)

Scientific classification
- Kingdom: Plantae
- Clade: Embryophytes
- Clade: Tracheophytes
- Clade: Angiosperms
- Clade: Eudicots
- Order: Caryophyllales
- Family: Polygonaceae
- Genus: Eriogonum
- Species: E. brachypodum

Binomial name
- Eriogonum brachypodum Torr. & A.Gray

Synonyms
- Eriogonum parryi

= Eriogonum brachypodum =

Species of wild buckwheat

Eriogonum brachypodum is a species of wild buckwheat known by the common name Parry's buckwheat. This annual herb is native to the southwestern United States from California to Utah and especially the Mojave Desert. It grows in sandy and gravelly substrates. It has a skeletonlike spindly stem which branches many times. It can grow 5 to 50 centimeters in height and up to a meter in width. There is an array of rounded, dark-colored leaves around the base. Leaves are a few centimeters long and fuzzy on the undersides. Most of the plant is actually the spreading inflorescence. At intervals on the otherwise naked branches hang tiny clusters of glandular flowers a few millimeters wide in involucres of bell-shaped bracts. Each flower is less than three millimeters wide.

== Taxonomy ==
The botanists John Torrey and Asa Gray scientifically described a new species in the Eriogonum genus in 1870, naming it Eriogonum brachypodum. It was proposed by Philip Alexander Munz that it be classified as a variety of Eriogonum deflexum in 1935 and as a subspecies by Susan Gabriella Stokes in 1936. Together with its genus it is part of the Polygonaceae family. The species has four synonyms.

Table of Synonyms
Name	Year	Rank	Notes
Eriogonum deflexum subsp. brachypodum (Torr. & A.Gray) S.Stokes	1936	subspecies	≡ hom.
Eriogonum deflexum var. brachypodum (Torr. & A.Gray) Munz	1935	variety	≡ hom.
Eriogonum deflexum subsp. parryi (A.Gray) S.Stokes	1936	subspecies	= het.
Eriogonum parryi A.Gray	1874	species	= het.
Notes: ≡ homotypic synonym; = heterotypic synonym
