= Eyehill Creek =

River in Western Canada

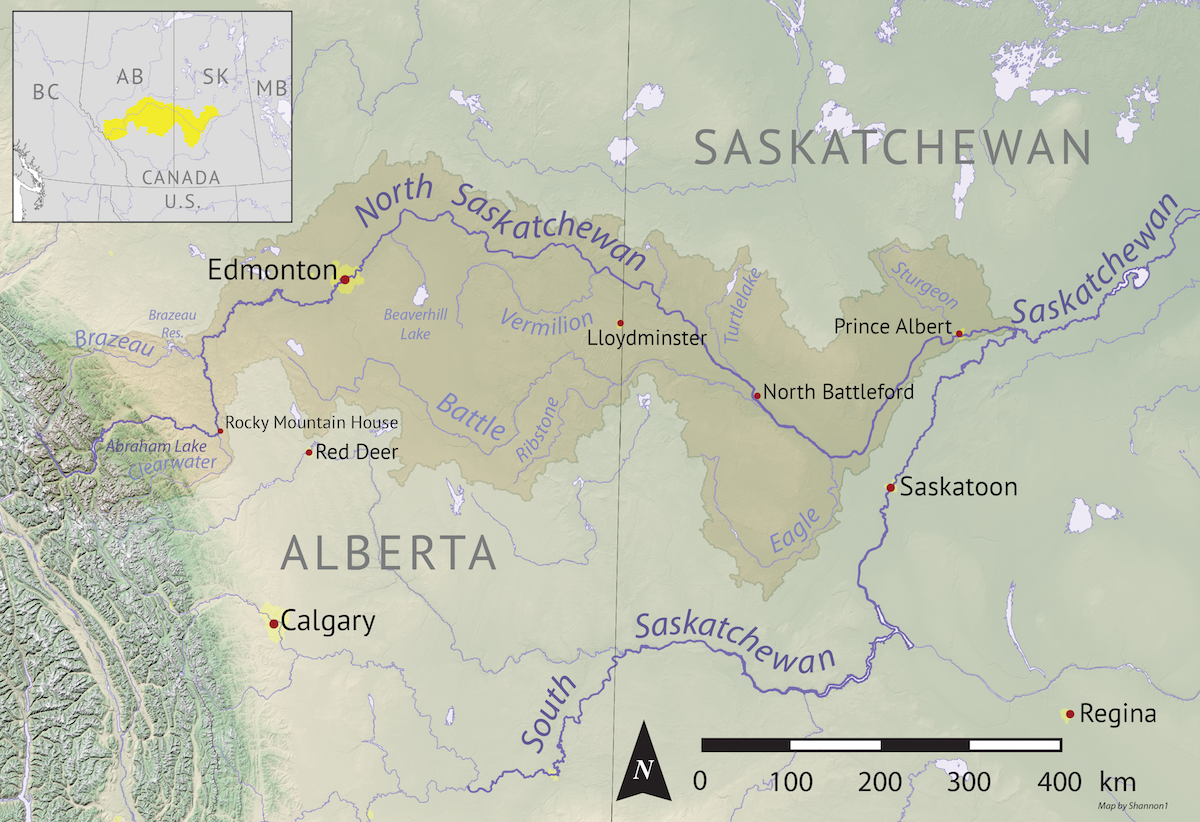
- North Saskatchewan River drainage basin

- Location of the mouth in Saskatchewan Eyehill Creek (Canada)

Location
- Country: Canada
- Provinces: Saskatchewan; Alberta

Physical characteristics
- Source: Sounding Lake
  - location: Special Area No. 4, Alberta
  - coordinates: 52.1521°N 110.4306°W
  - elevation: 655 m (2,149 ft)
- Mouth: Manitou Lake, Saskatchewan
  - location: RM of Hillsdale No. 440
  - coordinates: 52.6834°N 109.6508°W
  - elevation: 591 m (1,939 ft)

Basin features
- River system: Saskatchewan River
- Tributaries
  - right: Hallam Creek

Eyehill Creek is a river in the Canadian provinces of Alberta and Saskatchewan. The river begins at Sounding Lake in Alberta and flows east and north into Manitou Lake in Saskatchewan. Eyehill Creek is the primary inflow for Manitou Lake, which has no outflow. The Manitou Lake watershed is a large endorheic basin between the Battle River watershed (a tributary of the North Saskatchewan River) to the north and the South Saskatchewan River watershed to the south. While endorheic, it is considered part of the Battle River basin.

In the 1930s, Eyehill Creek was part of a planned, but never implemented, large-scale flood and drought mitigation project.

== Course ==
Eyehill Creek begins at Sounding Lake in Alberta. The lake's primary inflow is Sounding Creek, which flows in from the west to the southern end of the lake. Eyehill Creek flows out of Sounding Lake from its eastern shore and heads east towards the Saskatchewan border. As it crosses the border, it begins to flow in a more northerly direction towards the town of Macklin. At Macklin, two small lakes are connected to the river — Macklin Lake and Hallam Lake. From Macklin, the river continues north past Evesham, Little Manitou Lake, and Yonker before emptying into the south end of Manitou Lake.

== Red Deer River Diversion project ==
In 1935, the Prairie Farm Rehabilitation Administration reviewed for feasibility the North Saskatchewan Irrigation Project that was produced in 1920 by William Pearce for Canada's Department of Reclamation Services. The project's purpose was for flood and drought mitigation in Alberta and Saskatchewan.

The Red Deer River Diversion part of the project involved constructing dams and reservoirs in the headwaters of the Red Deer River in Alberta to control and supply water moving downstream. Eyehill Creek was a major component of the proposed project. A large diversion channel was to be built from the Red Deer River to Sullivan Lake. Water would then be diverted east from Sullivan Lake to Sounding Creek where it would be carried downstream to Eyehill Creek and Saskatchewan. About 321 kilometres (199 mi) of natural creek bed would be used and it would allow for the irrigation of 2,990 square kilometres (1,150 sq mi) of farmland in the Rosetown and Saskatoon areas. The project was never initiated.

== See also ==
- List of rivers of Saskatchewan
- List of rivers of Alberta
- Hudson Bay drainage basin
