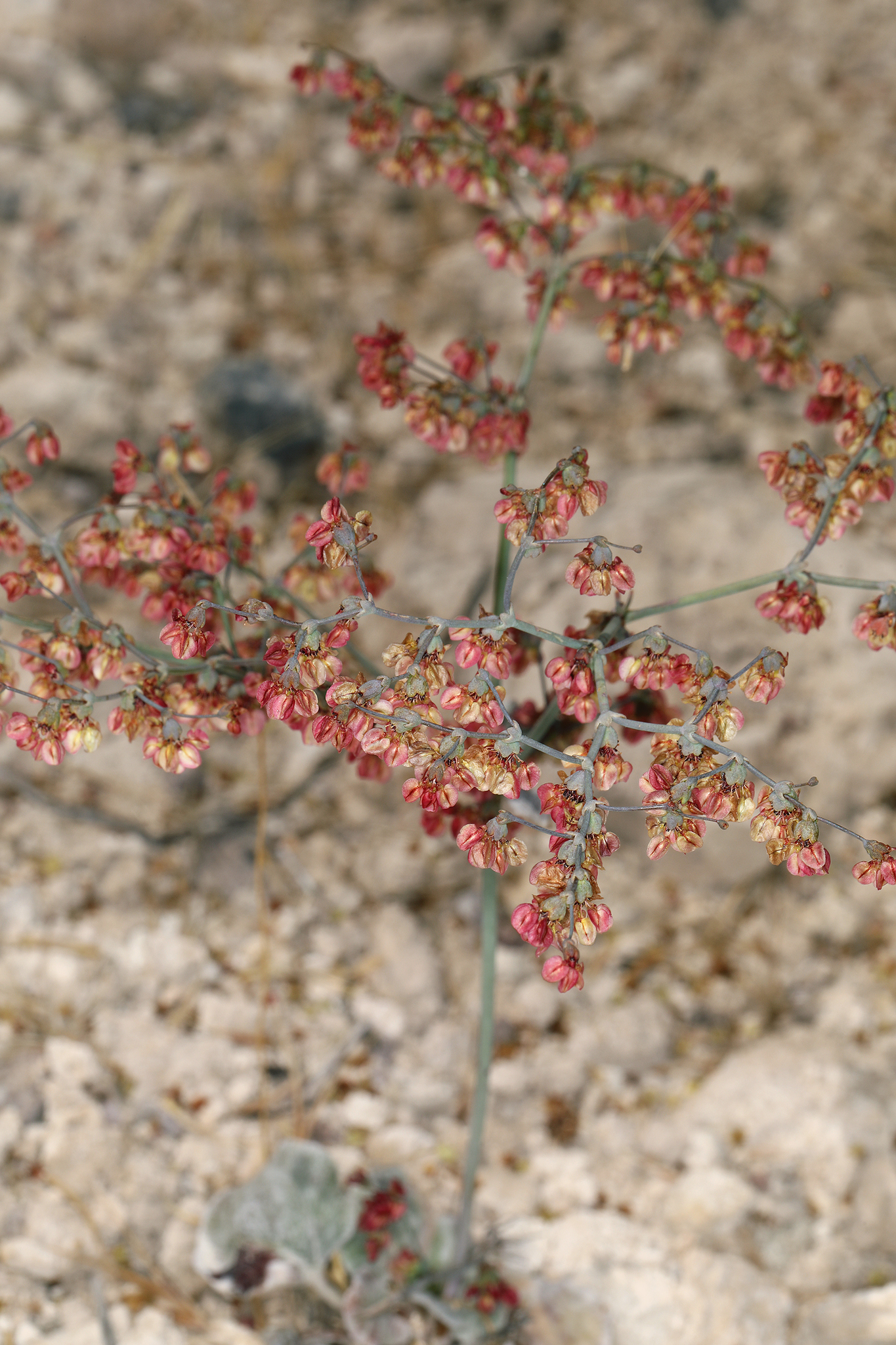

Conservation status
- Secure (NatureServe)

Scientific classification
- Kingdom: Plantae
- Clade: Embryophytes
- Clade: Tracheophytes
- Clade: Angiosperms
- Clade: Eudicots
- Order: Caryophyllales
- Family: Polygonaceae
- Genus: Eriogonum
- Species: E. hookeri

Binomial name
- Eriogonum hookeri S.Watson

= Eriogonum hookeri =

Species of wild buckwheat

Eriogonum hookeri is a species of wild buckwheat known by the common name Hooker's buckwheat. It is native to the Intermountain West of the United States, where it grows in plateau and desert habitat.

== Description ==
It is an annual herb producing an erect stem surrounded at the base with a small patch of round, woolly leaves. The branched flowering stem is hairless and waxy in texture. It spreads into an inflorescence lined with many small dangling clusters of yellow to reddish flowers, each individual flower just a few millimeters wide.

== Taxonomy ==
In 1879 Sereno Watson described a new species in the Eriogonum genus, which he named Eriogonum hookeri. The botanist Susan Gabriella Stokes published a description of the taxa as a subspecies of Eriogonum deflexum in 1936 and also a variety of the species named gilvum that is also considered a synonym of the species. Along with its genus, it is part of the wider Polygonaceae family.
