= Sounding Creek =

River in Alberta, Canada

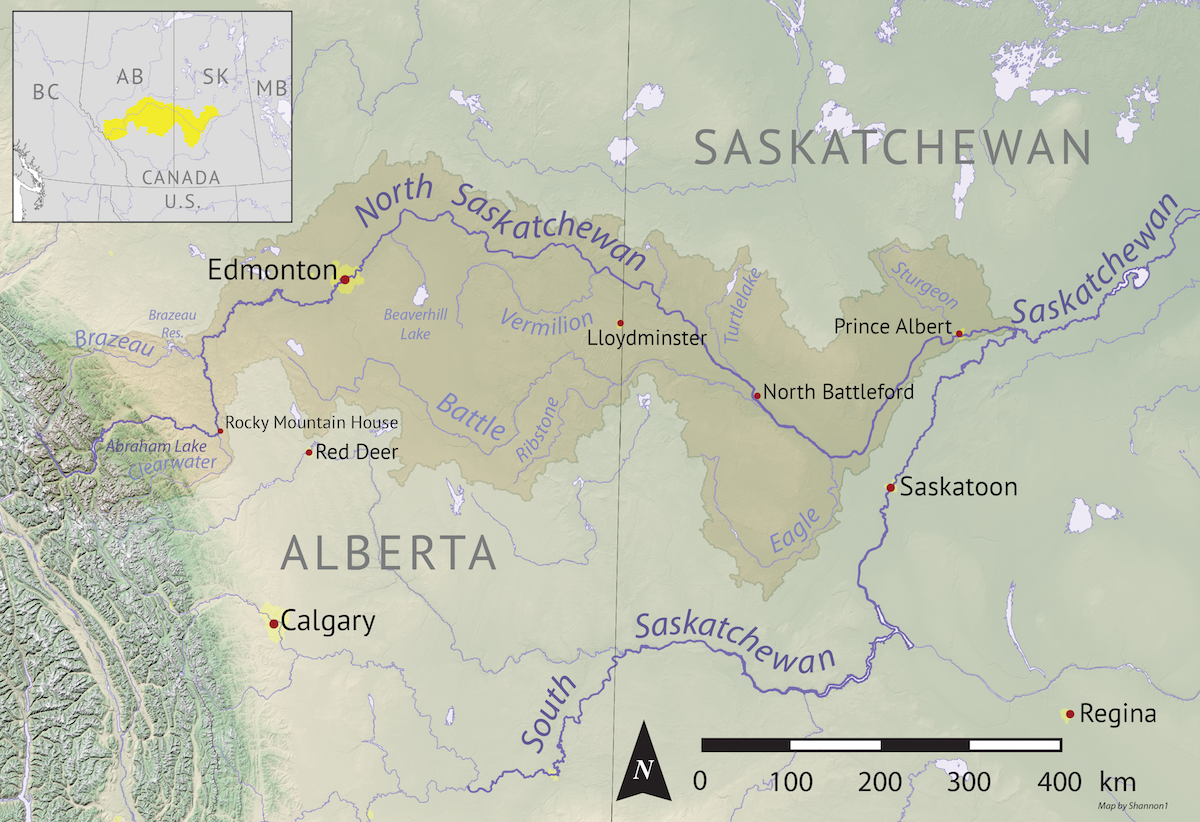
- North Saskatchewan River drainage basin

- Location of the river's mouth in Alberta Sounding Creek (Canada)

Location
- Country: Canada
- Province: Alberta

Physical characteristics
- Source
  - location: County of Paintearth No. 18
  - coordinates: 52.0369°N 111.8112°W
- Mouth: Sounding Lake
  - location: Special Area No. 4
  - coordinates: 52.1103°N 110.4678°W
  - elevation: 655 m (2,149 ft)
- Basin size: 10,000 km^{2} (3,900 sq mi)

Basin features
- River system: Battle River
- Tributaries
  - left: Monitor Creek
- Waterbodies: Antelope Lake; Sounding Creek Reservoir; Grassy Island Lake

Sounding Creek is a river in the Canadian province of Alberta. It begins east of Sullivan Lake and flows generally eastward into Sounding Lake; it is Sounding Lake's primary inflow. The river is within the Manitou Lake closed watershed. The climate along the river's course is warm-summer humid continental.

A-200 megawatt solar farm is proposed for a parcel of land within Sounding Creek's watershed. Sounding Creek Solar Energy Park is planned for a section of land north of the community of Sedalia.

In the 1930s, Sounding Creek was part of a planned, but never implemented, large-scale flood and drought mitigation project.

== Course and description ==
Sounding Creek is a river in the south-eastern part of Alberta that has a drainage basin that covers about 10,000 km^{2} (3,900 sq mi). The river is part of a closed basin system that terminates at Manitou Lake in the neighbouring province of Saskatchewan. While it is a closed system, geographically it is considered part of the Battle River watershed. The Battle River is a major tributary of the North Saskatchewan River.

Sounding Creek begins from a small slough east of Sullivan Lake and Highway 36 in the County of Paintearth No. 18. It flows south-east through Special Area No. 2 and Special Area No. 3 before turning north into Special Area No. 4 en route to its mouth at the southern end of Sounding Lake. Sounding Lake, and its surrounding shoreline — including the mouth of Sounding Creek — is an Important Bird Area of Canada.

Communities found near the banks of Sounding Creek include Esther, Pemukan, and Sounding Lake. Lakes found along the river's course include Antelope Lake, Sounding Creek Reservoir, and Grassy Island Lake. Several highways cross the river, including 872, 884, 886, 41, and 12. Just south of the Highway 12 crossing, is the confluence of Sounding Creek and Monitor Creek.

== Red Deer River Diversion project ==
In 1935, the Prairie Farm Rehabilitation Administration reviewed for feasibility the North Saskatchewan Irrigation Project that was produced in 1920 by William Pearce for Canada's Department of Reclamation Services. The project's purpose was for flood and drought mitigation in Alberta and Saskatchewan.

The Red Deer River Diversion part of the project involved constructing dams and reservoirs in the headwaters of the Red Deer River in Alberta to control and supply water moving downstream. Sounding Creek was a major component of the proposed project. A large diversion channel was to be built from the Red Deer River to Sullivan Lake where water would be stored. Water would then be diverted a short distance east from the lake to Sounding Creek. Sounding Creek would then carry the water downstream to Eyehill Creek and Saskatchewan. About 321 kilometres (199 mi) of natural creek bed would be used and it would allow for the irrigation of 2,990 km^{2} (1,150 sq mi) of farmland in Saskatchewan. The project was never initiated.

== See also ==
- List of rivers of Alberta
- Hudson Bay drainage basin
