= Crow Indian Lake =

- Location within Alberta
- Location: Alberta, Canada
- Coordinates: 49.3697222°N 111.7841667°W
- Type: Lake

Crow Indian Lake is a lake in Alberta, Canada.

Crow Indian Lake takes its name from the Crow Nation.

== See also ==
- List of lakes of Alberta
