= Lessard Lake (Alberta) =

Lake in Alberta, Canada

- Location within Alberta
- Location: Lac Ste. Anne County, Alberta
- Coordinates: 53°47′06″N 114°39′09″W
- Basin countries: Canada
- Max. length: 2 km (1.2 mi)
- Max. width: 2.5 km (1.6 mi)
- Surface area: 3.21 km^{2} (1.24 sq mi)
- Average depth: 3.9 m (13 ft)
- Max. depth: 6 m (20 ft)
- Surface elevation: 738 m (2,421 ft)
- References: Lessard Lake

Lessard Lake is a lake in Alberta.

== See also ==
- List of lakes of Alberta
