= Ipiatik Lake =

- Location within Alberta
- Location: Alberta, Canada
- Coordinates: 55.2894444°N 111.0530556°W
- Type: Lake

Ipiatik Lake is a lake in Alberta, Canada.

Ipiatik is a name derived from the Cree language meaning "look out".

== See also ==
- List of lakes of Alberta
