= Barreyre Lake =

- Location within Alberta
- Location: Alberta, Canada
- Coordinates: 54.2744445°N 110.695°W
- Type: lake

Barreyre Lake is a lake in Alberta, Canada.

Barreyre Lake has the name of Alphonse Barreyre, a pioneer citizen.

== See also ==
- List of lakes of Alberta
