= Twin Lake (Alberta) =

Lake in Alberta, Canada

- Location within Alberta
- Location: County of Wetaskiwin No. 10, Alberta
- Coordinates: 52.949°N 114.365°W
- Basin countries: Canada
- Max. length: 0.4 km (0.25 mi)
- Max. width: 0.7 km (0.43 mi)
- Surface area: 24 ha (59 acres)
- Average depth: 15.7 m (52 ft)
- Max. depth: 35 m (115 ft)
- Surface elevation: 925 m (3,035 ft)
- References: Twin Lake

Twin Lake is a lake in Alberta.

== See also ==
- List of lakes of Alberta
