= Muriel Lake (Alberta) =

Closed basin lake in Alberta, Canada

- Location within Alberta
- Location: Bonnyville No. 87, Alberta
- Coordinates: 54°08′46″N 110°41′21″W
- Basin countries: Canada
- Max. length: 10.7 km (6.6 mi)
- Max. width: 10.6 km (6.6 mi)
- Surface area: 64.1 km^{2} (24.7 sq mi)
- Average depth: 6.6 m (22 ft)
- Max. depth: 10.7 m (35 ft)
- Surface elevation: 559 m (1,834 ft)
- References: Muriel Lake

Muriel Lake is a closed basin lake in Alberta, Canada. Although its water level has been steadily declining since 1980, this is tied to precipitation and tends to fluctuate in water level.

== See also ==
- List of lakes in Alberta
