= Brokenleg Lake =

- Location within Alberta
- Location: Alberta, Canada
- Coordinates: 51.186°N 115.070°W
- Type: lake

Brokenleg Lake is a lake in Alberta, Canada.

Brokenleg Lake's name is an accurate preservation of its native name.

== See also ==
- List of lakes of Alberta
