= Utikuma Lake =

Lake in Alberta, Canada

- Location within Alberta
- Location: Big Lakes County / Northern Sunrise County, Alberta And is within and part of whitefish lake First Nations #459
- Coordinates: 55°50′N 115°25′W
- Primary outflows: Utikuma River
- Catchment area: 2,170 km^{2} (840 sq mi)
- Basin countries: Canada
- Max. length: 16.9 km (10.5 mi)
- Max. width: 27.1 km (16.8 mi)
- Surface area: 288 km^{2} (111 sq mi)
- Average depth: 1.7 m (5 ft 7 in)
- Max. depth: 5.5 m (18 ft)
- Surface elevation: 641 m (2,103 ft)
- References: Utikuma Lake

Utikuma Lake is a large lake in north-central Alberta, Canada. It is located 30 km (19 mi) north of the Lesser Slave Lake, between the Bicentennial Highway and Highway 750.

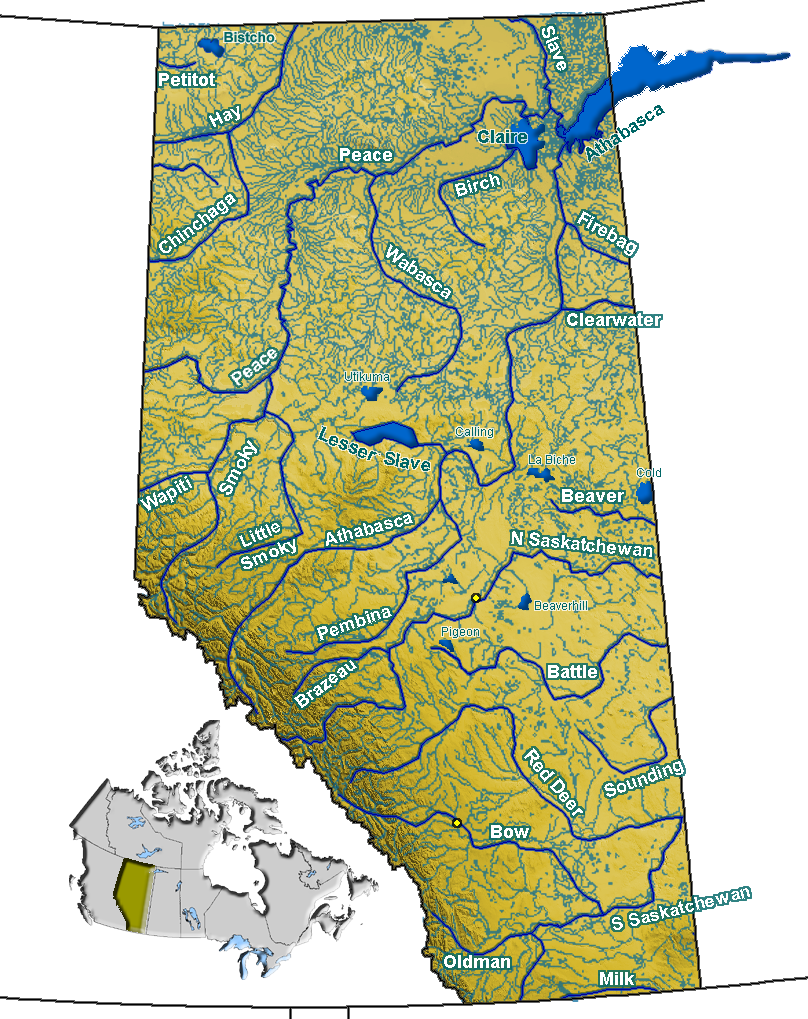

It has a total surface of 288 km^{2} (111 sq mi) with 15.3 km^{2} (5.9 sq mi) island area. The shallow lake (maximum depth is 5.5 m (18 ft)) lies at an elevation of 648 m (2,126 ft). It is drained by the Utikuma River and then Wabasca River to Peace River.

The name Uticuma is Cree for "big whitefish".

The Utikoomak Lake 155 indian reserve of the Whitefish Lake First Nations is established on the northern shore.

== See also ==
- Lakes of Alberta
