= Tucker Lake (Alberta) =

Lake in Alberta, Canada

- Location within Alberta
- Location: Bonnyville No. 87, Alberta, Canada
- Coordinates: 54°32′03″N 110°36′20″W
- Basin countries: Canada
- Max. length: 2.2 km (1.4 mi)
- Max. width: 5.7 km (3.5 mi)
- Surface area: 6.65 km^{2} (2.57 sq mi)
- Average depth: 2.9 m (9 ft 6 in)
- Max. depth: 7.5 m (25 ft)
- Surface elevation: 555 m (1,821 ft)
- References: Tucker Lake

Tucker Lake is a lake in Alberta, Canada. Tucker Lake is Located in the Improvement District No. 18 (South), about 280 km (170 mi) northeast of the city of Edmonton.

== Origin ==
The origin of the name "Tucker" is not known. Locally, the lake is called Little Jackfish Lake, probably because of the abundant but small northern pike that inhabit its waters.

== See also ==
- List of lakes of Alberta
