= Bearhills Lake =

Lake in Alberta, Canada

- Location within Alberta
- Location: Alberta, Canada
- Coordinates: 52.9386111°N 113.6138889°W
- Type: Lake

Bearhills Lake is a lake in Alberta, Canada.

Bearhills Lake takes its name from nearby Bear Hills.

== See also ==
- List of lakes of Alberta
