= Formby Lake =

- Location within Alberta
- Location: Alberta, Canada
- Coordinates: 56.25°N 110.0252778°W
- Type: Lakes

Formby Lake is a lake in Alberta, Canada.

Formby Lake takes its name from Formby, in England.

== See also ==
- List of lakes of Alberta
