= Brander Lake =

- Location within Alberta
- Location: Alberta, Canada
- Coordinates: 58.428180°N 110.060300°W
- Type: Lake

Brander Lake is a lake in Alberta, Canada.

Brander Lake was named for a Dr. Brander, who was a native of Edmonton.

== See also ==
- List of lakes of Alberta
