= Mann Lakes =

Group of lakes in Canada

- Location within Alberta
- Location: County of St. Paul No. 19, Alberta
- Coordinates: 54.158°N 111.509°W
- Basin countries: Canada
- Max. length: Upper 3.1 km (1.9 mi); Lower 3 km (1.9 mi)
- Max. width: Upper 3.3 km (2.1 mi); Lower 3.5 km (2.2 mi)
- Surface area: Upper 4.59 km^{2} (1.77 sq mi); Lower 5.10 km^{2} (1.97 sq mi)
- Average depth: Upper 5.7 m (19 ft); Lower 4.0 m (13.1 ft)
- Max. depth: Upper 9.1 m (30 ft); Lower 6.1 m (20 ft)
- Surface elevation: Upper 618 m (2,028 ft); Lower 617 m (2,024 ft)
- References: Mann Lakes

The Mann Lakes are two close basin lakes in Alberta. Once a single lake named Mann Lake, the construction of Highway 28 in 1961 split the lake in two. The more southerly Upper Mann Lake lies at 54°08′37″N 111°30′57″W, and just north of it, the more northerly Lower Mann Lake at 54°10′N 111°30′W. Since 1980, their water levels has been steadily declining.

== See also ==
- List of lakes in Alberta
