= Hutch Lake (Alberta) =

- Location within Alberta
- Location: northern Alberta, Canada
- Coordinates: 58.757°N 117.324°W
- Type: reservoir

Hutch Lake is a man-made lake in northern Alberta, Canada within Mackenzie County. It is located on the Highway 35 (the Mackenzie Highway), approximately 35 km (22 mi) north of the Town of High Level.

Hutch Lake was constructed in October 1989, officially opening on June 22, 1990, to fulfill the need for a long-term water source for High Level. The lake features a recreation area, privately owned residential lots and trail systems. The recreation area includes a campground and a day use area and the trails are used for hiking, quadding, skiing and snowmobiling.

== See also ==
- List of lakes of Alberta
