= Gadsby Lake =

Lake in Alberta, Canada

- Location within Alberta
- Location: Alberta, Canada
- Coordinates: 52.54°N 113.2336111°W
- Type: Lake

Gadsby Lake is a lake in Alberta, Canada.

Gadsby Lake has the name of James Gadsby, a pioneer citizen.

== History ==
=== James Gadsby ===
James Gadsby (1847-1932), nick-named Long-Hair Jim, was not only the first settler in this area, but he was also one of the most colorful. He was born in St. Catherines, Ontario in 1847, but left home at an early age and crossed into the United States. The son of a blacksmith, his adventures as a soldier, gunman, outlaw, prospector and cowhand made him a living legend. His life as a soldier and an associate of the infamous Jesse James Gang brought him a reputation of shooting "fast and straight".

In the 1870s, he escaped back to Canada. Upon his return, he worked as a cowhand on a ranch west of High River then landed in Calgary for a year or two before the railroad came through. His next adventure was working for the Canadian Pacific Railway as a surveyor, Jim named many of the small towns between Peace River and Calgary. Jim met his wife, Mary Root, a Cree Indian, while freighting goods out in the wilderness. He was so impressed by her ability to handle heavy bags of flour that he took her for his wife. Together, Jim and Mary raised 8 children.

Jim and his family settled on a homestead on the shore of Spotted Lake, twenty-five miles east of Lacombe. His homestead, number 61912, was the first registered homestead in the area. The Gadsby family eventually moved their home to the homestead of their eldest son in the NW-6-41-22 W4M. Jim was a respected member of the community. In 1895 he helped build the St. Monicas Anglican Church in Mirror. This Gadsby Lake district as well as the Gadsby Lake School located in NE 10-41-23 W4M are both named after him. Jim died in 1932 in the Stettler Hospital at the age of 85. He and his wife are buried in the Mirror Cemetery.

== See also ==
- List of lakes of Alberta
