= Pakowki Lake =

Lake in Alberta, Canada

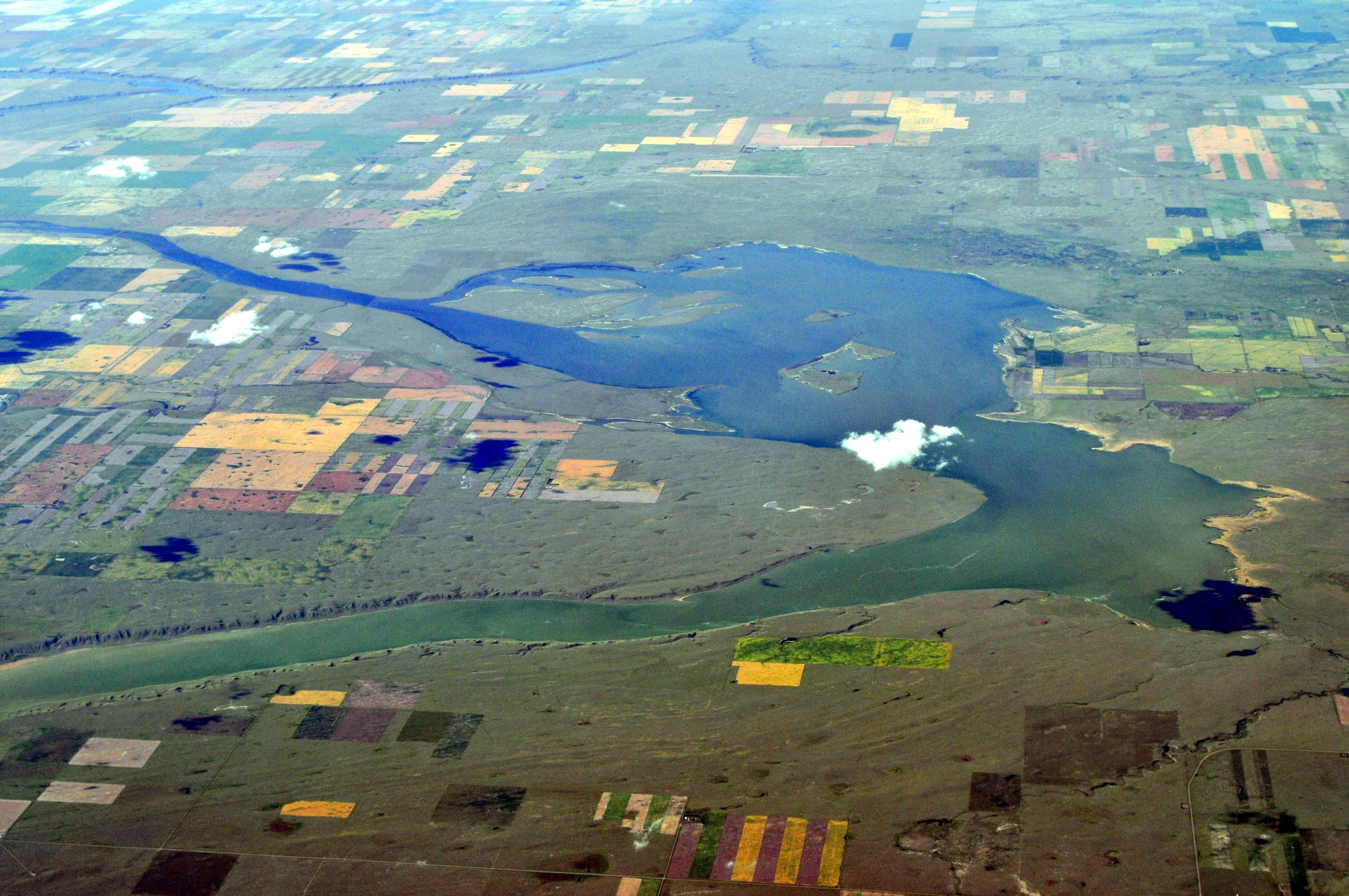
- Pakowki Lake, aerial photograph, August 2013

- Location within Canada Location within Alberta
- Location: County of Forty Mile No. 8, Alberta
- Coordinates: 49°18′24″N 110°54′18″W
- Lake type: Endorheic lake, slough
- Primary inflows: Etzikom Coulee, Irrigation Creek, Erickson Coulee, Ketchum Creek, Canal Creek, Bond Coulee, Bryant Coulee
- Primary outflows: None
- Basin countries: Canada
- Max. length: 35 km (22 mi)
- Max. width: 8 km (5.0 mi)
- Surface area: 123 km^{2} (47 sq mi)
- Average depth: 1.2 m (3 ft 11 in)
- Surface elevation: 860 m (2,820 ft)

Pakowki Lake is an endorheic lake in Alberta, Canada located south of Etzikom, Alberta and not far north is the former town site of Pakowki which may have received its name from the lake.

It is located in the prairies of Southern Alberta, at an elevation of 860 metres (2,820 ft), in the County of Forty Mile No. 8. It is fed by a number of coulees and creeks, such as Etzikom Coulee, Irrigation Creek, Erickson Coulee, Ketchum Creek, Canal Creek, Bond Coulee and Bryant Coulee, and has no outflow. Reaching a maximum extent of 123 km^{2} (47 sq mi), it is one of the largest lakes in the province.

The name means "bad water" in Blackfoot language, named so for the bad smell caused by the lack of an outflow. While it is the largest water body in southern Alberta, its waters are intermittent, and it can be classified as a slough. In times of flooding, the lake overflows through a channel into the Milk River, which flows 6 kilometres (3.7 mi) south of the lake.

Pakowki Lake is exactly antipodal to the Kerguelen Islands.

== Conservation ==
The Pakowki Lake Provincial Bird Sanctuary is established on and around the lake, which provides congregations of waterfowl and waders, as a staging area for migration along the western flyway. The lake is designated an important bird area and listed by Bird Studies Canada and Bird Life International as globally significant but none of the lake has federal or provincial protected status.

Species of birds observed at the lake include double-crested cormorant, black-crowned night-heron, marsh wren, cinnamon teal and American bittern.

Mammals such as pronghorns, badgers, coyotes, striped skunks and porcupines are commonly found on the shores as well.

The lake lies in a sand dune-wetland environment of the grassland biome. Flora on the lake shores consists of threatened western spiderwort (Tradescantia occidentalis), vulnerable smooth goosefoot (Chenopodium subglabrum), Great Basin Downingia and skeletonweed (Eriogonum deflexum).

The lake contains no fish species.

== Avian botulism ==
In high water years, the lake kills hundreds of thousands of birds due to avian botulism. Government studies conclude that nothing can be done to prevent the botulism.
