= Bear Hills =

Hilly area in Alberta, Canada

Coordinates: 52.86682°N 113.552°W

Bear Hills is a summit in Alberta, Canada.

Bear Hills's name is an accurate preservation of its native Cree name, mus-kwa-chi-si, more properly spelled maskwacîsihk.

== See also ==
- Bearhills Lake
