= Dowling Lake =

- Location within Alberta
- Location: Alberta, Canada
- Coordinates: 51.7255°N 112.0198°W
- Type: lake

Dowling Lake is a lake in Alberta, Canada.

Dowling Lake was named for D. B. Dowling, a government surveyor.

== See also ==
- List of lakes of Alberta
