= Ewing Lake =

- Location within Alberta
- Location: Stettler County, Alberta, Canada
- Coordinates: 52.1646°N 112.8680°W
- Type: lake

Ewing Lake is a lake in Stettler County Alberta, Canada. It is southwest of the town of Stettler, about 65 km east of Red Deer.

Ewing Lake has the name of John Ewing, a pioneer citizen.

== See also ==
- List of lakes of Alberta
