= Baxter Lakes =

- Location within Alberta
- Location: Alberta, Canada
- Coordinates: 52.9058333°N 110.7216667°W
- Type: Lake

Baxter Lakes is a lake in Alberta, Canada, situated approximately 5 km (3.1 mi) northeast of Wainwright. The lake is an area of environmental and national significance, according to Alberta Parks.

Baxter Lakes has the name of a surveyor's assistant.

== See also ==
- List of lakes of Alberta
