= Lake Annette (Alberta) =

- Location within Alberta
- Location: Alberta, Canada
- Coordinates: 51.367°N 116.210°W
- Type: lake

Lake Annette is a lake in Alberta, Canada.

Lake Annette was named after Annette Astley, the wife of a local entrepreneur.

== See also ==
- List of lakes of Alberta
