= Sullivan Lake (Alberta) =

Lake in Alberta, Canada

- Location in Alberta Sullivan Lake (Canada)
- Location: County of Paintearth No. 18, Alberta
- Coordinates: 52.0144°N 111.9653°W
- Type: Alkali lake
- Part of: South Saskatchewan River drainage basin
- Primary outflows: None
- Basin countries: Canada
- Surface area: 7,701.4 ha (19,031 acres)
- Surface elevation: 823 m (2,700 ft)
- Settlements: None

Sullivan Lake is an alkali lake in the east-central part of the Canadian province of Alberta. It is about 25 kilometres (16 mi) south of Castor, just west of Highway 36 and the locality of Sullivan Lake. The lake is within an Important Bird Area (IBA) of Canada and is an important stop-over for migrating waterfowl.

In 1935, the Prairie Farm Rehabilitation Administration (PFRA) studied the feasibility of a 1920 proposal that would have seen Sullivan Lake turned into a large reservoir for flood and drought mitigation and to supply water for irrigation for about 5,710 km^{2} (2,200 sq mi) of land.

== Description ==
Sullivan Lake is an endorheic alkali lake in south-central Alberta within the Red Deer River watershed. The Red Deer River is a tributary of the South Saskatchewan River. Sullivan Lake is a U-shaped lake that covers an area of 7,701.4 hectares (19,031 acres). The surrounding landscape consists of native mixed-grass prairie and farmland.

Sullivan Lake and its surrounding shoreline is designated as Sullivan Lake Castor (AB027) Important Bird Area (IBA) of Canada. The IBA covers 221.34 km^{2} (85.46 sq mi) and is a resting site for several migrating waterfowl, such as geese, swans, and cranes.

== Red Deer Diversion Project ==
In 1935, the Prairie Farm Rehabilitation Administration reviewed for feasibility the North Saskatchewan Irrigation Project that was produced in 1920 by William Pearce for Canada's Department of Reclamation Services. The project's purpose was for flood and drought mitigation in Alberta and Saskatchewan.

The Red Deer Diversion part of the project involved constructing dams and reservoirs in the headwaters of the Red Deer River in Alberta to control and supply water moving downstream. A large diversion channel was to be built from the Red Deer River to Sullivan Lake as it was estimated that Sullivan Lake could store approximately 2,405,744 dam^{3} (1,950,368 acre⋅ft) of water. Water would then be diverted a short distance east to Sounding Creek where it would be carried downstream to Eyehill Creek and Saskatchewan. It would allow for the irrigation of 2,990 km^{2} (1,150 sq mi) of farmland in the Rosetown and Saskatoon areas.

Also, water would be diverted from the Sullivan Lake reservoir south-east to several streams, including Bull Pond, Berry, Blood Indian, and Alkali. Communities that would have been affected by the water re-distribution included Sullivan Lake, Berry Creek, Monitor, Acadia Valley, Kindersley, and Elrose. An additional 2,719 km^{2} (1,050 sq mi) of land would have been irrigated "making the total irrigable area under the 1935 proposed project 5710 km2". The project was never initiated.

== See also ==
- List of lakes of Alberta
