= Rattlesnake Lake (Alberta) =

Lake in Alberta, Canada

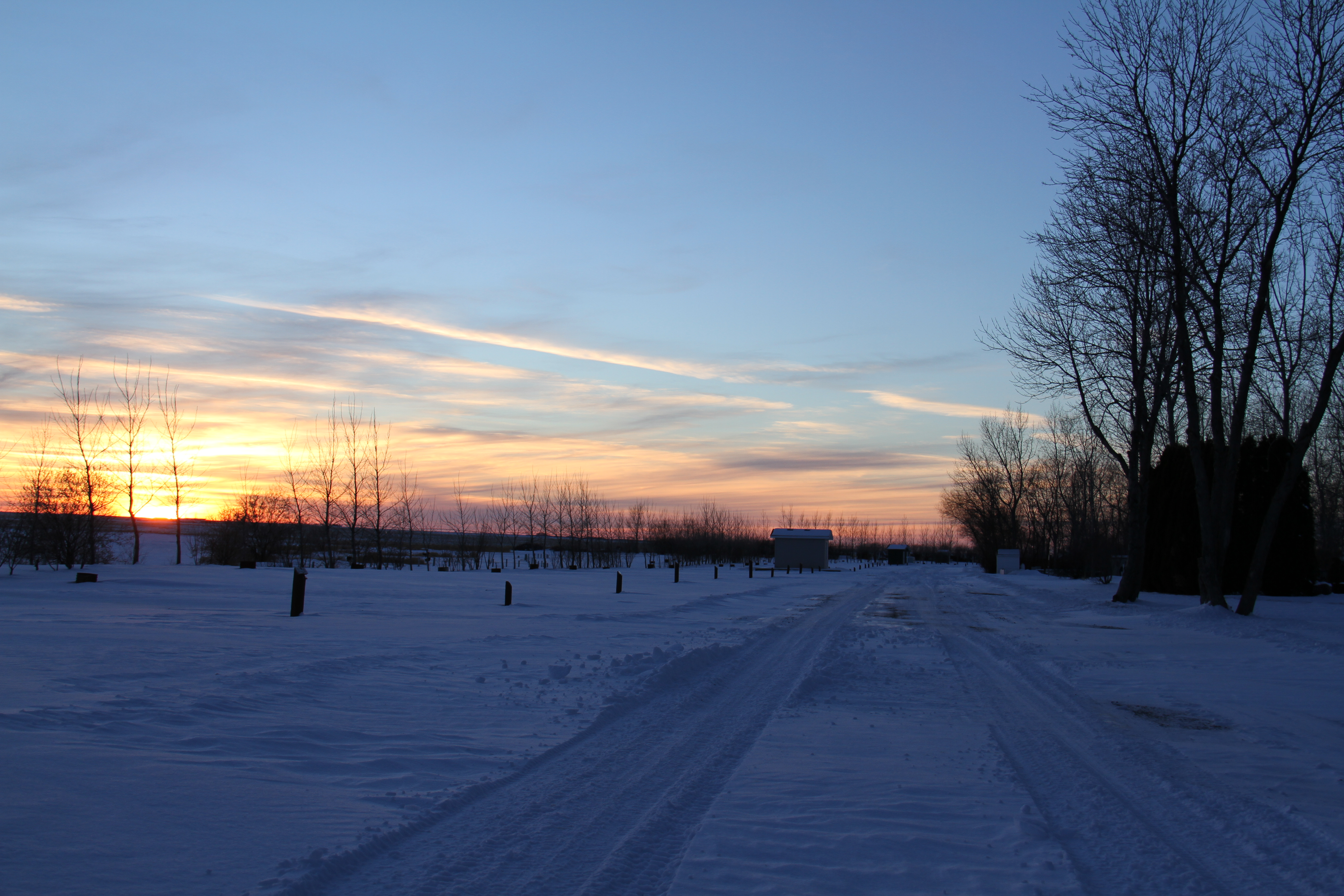

- Location within Alberta
- Location: Alberta
- Coordinates: 49°58′01″N 110°59′55″W
- Primary inflows: Stafford Reservoir
- Primary outflows: Murray Lake
- Basin countries: Canada
- Max. length: 9.9 km (6.2 mi)
- Max. width: 2.3 km (1.4 mi)
- Surface area: 1,070 ha (2,600 acres)
- Average depth: 3.6 m (12 ft)
- Max. depth: 22 m (72 ft)
- Water volume: 38,071.23 dam^{3} (1.344473×10^{9} cu ft)
- Surface elevation: 794 m (2,605 ft)
- Islands: 0
- Settlements: 0

Rattlesnake Lake, also known as Sauder Reservoir, is a manmade lake in southern Alberta, Canada. It is located approximately 23 km (14 mi) northwest of Seven Persons and 29 km (18 mi) west of Medicine Hat.

== Attractions ==
Golden Sheaf Park, which contains 454 private campsites, is located adjacent to the lake.

== See also ==
- List of lakes in Alberta
