= Sauer Lake (Alberta) =

Lake in Alberta, Canada

- Location within Alberta
- Location: Parkland County, Alberta
- Coordinates: 53°36′48″N 114°04′43″W
- Basin countries: Canada
- Max. length: 0.3 km (0.19 mi)
- Max. width: 0.3 km (0.19 mi)
- Surface area: 8.5 ha (21 acres)
- Average depth: 4.2 m (14 ft)
- Max. depth: 14 m (46 ft)
- Surface elevation: 737 m (2,418 ft)
- References: Sauer Lake

Sauer Lake is a lake in Alberta.
