= Angle Lake (Alberta) =

- Location within Alberta
- Location: Alberta, Canada
- Coordinates: 53.740°N 110.974°W
- Type: lake

Angle Lake is a lake in Alberta, Canada, located in County of Two Hills No. 21.

Angle Lake was named for the fact the lake's shape forms an angle.

== See also ==
- List of lakes of Alberta
