= Lac Santé =

Lake in Alberta, Canada

- Location within Alberta Location within Canada
- Location: County of Two Hills No. 21 / County of St. Paul No. 19, Alberta
- Coordinates: 53°50′33″N 111°33′14″W
- Basin countries: Canada
- Max. length: 10.4 km (6.5 mi)
- Max. width: 3.9 km (2.4 mi)
- Average depth: 9 m (30 ft)
- Max. depth: 27 m (89 ft)

Lac Santé is an Albertan lake best known for boating and other watersports. It has an area of 1,003 ha (2,478 acres) and is located in northern Alberta between Two Hills and St. Paul, the nearest town is Foisy. Lac Santé has two public boat launches, one in each County. There is also a public day use area at the Two Hills county boat launch.

In 1993 it was home to 150 breeding western grebes but by 2008 there were none left.
