= Headwall Lakes =

Group of lakes in Alberta, Canada

Coordinates: 50°48′21″N 115°14′46″W

The Headwall Lakes are in a valley south-east of Mount Chester in Kananaskis Country in Alberta, Canada. They can be accessed from the Smith-Dorrien / Spray Trail road. Their waters flow down Headwall Creek into Smith-Dorrien Creek then south east into Lower Kananaskis Lake

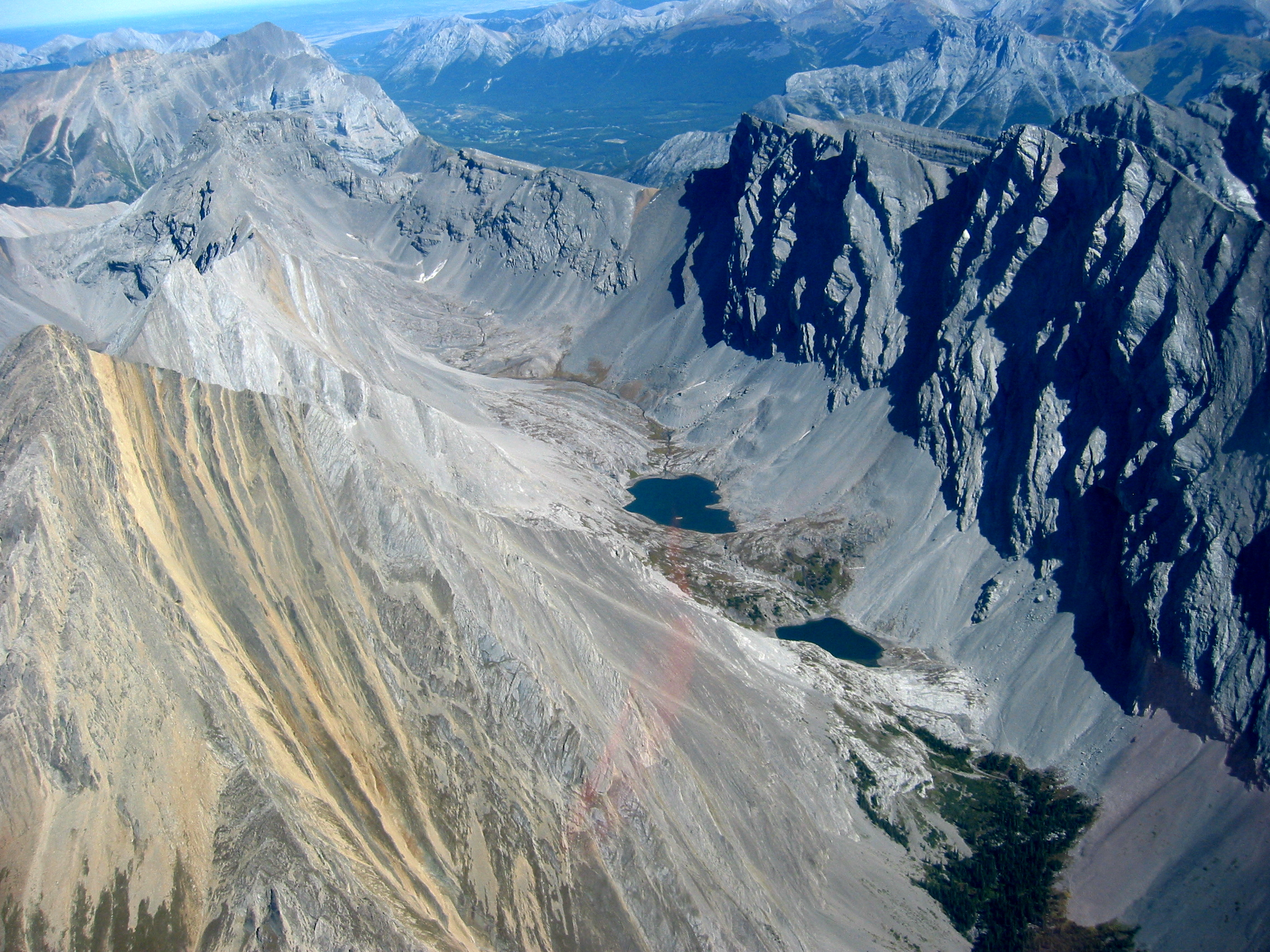
Headwall Lakes, Mount Chester, The Fortress
