= Peerless Lake (Alberta) =

Lake in Alberta, Canada

- Location within Alberta
- Location: Municipal District of Opportunity No. 17, Alberta
- Coordinates: 56°37′N 114°40′W
- Basin countries: Canada
- Max. length: 15.6 km (9.7 mi)
- Max. width: 9.7 km (6.0 mi)
- Surface area: 82.6 km^{2} (31.9 sq mi)
- Average depth: 14.6 m (48 ft)
- Max. depth: 35.4 m (116 ft)
- Surface elevation: 691 m (2,267 ft)
- References: Peerless Lake

Peerless Lake is a lake in northern Alberta, Canada.

== See also ==
- List of lakes in Alberta
