= Manitou Lake (Saskatchewan) =

Salt lake in Saskatchewan, Canada

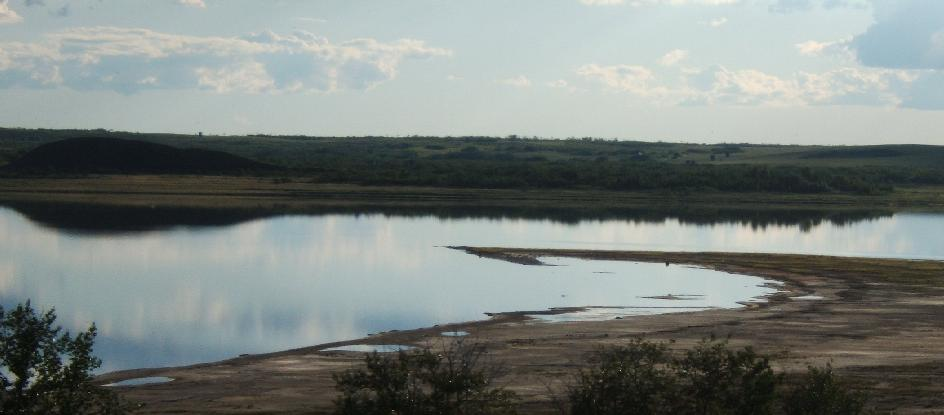
- North-West Bay

- Location in Saskatchewan Manitou Lake (Canada)
- Location: RM of Manitou Lake No. 442, Saskatchewan
- Coordinates: 52°43′N 109°43′W
- Type: Salt lake
- Part of: Saskatchewan River drainage basin
- Primary inflows: Eyehill Creek
- Primary outflows: None
- Basin countries: Canada
- Surface area: 8,000 ha (20,000 acres)
- Max. depth: 25 m (82 ft)
- Shore length^{1}: 91.1 km (56.6 mi)
- Surface elevation: 591 m (1,939 ft)
- Islands: Manitou Island
- Settlements: Marsden, Neilburg
- ^{1} Shore length is not a well-defined measure.

Manitou Lake is a salt lake located mostly in the RM of Manitou Lake No. 422 in the Canadian province of Saskatchewan, about 10 kilometres (6.2 mi) east of the provincial border with Alberta. The eastern shore of the lake is in the RM of Hillsdale No. 440. Manitou Lake is located in a region called the Prairie Pothole Region of North America, which extends throughout three Canadian provinces and five U.S. states. It is also within Palliser's Triangle and the Great Plains ecoregion. Manitou Lake is part of an Important Bird Area (IBA) of Canada that covers 699.66 km^{2} (270.14 sq mi) of land and several neighbouring lakes.

Due to the lake being endorheic and quite salty, there are no fish in it. Manitou Island in the centre of the lake is now connected to the southern shore as the water level has lowered.

== Description ==
The primary inflow for the lake is from Eyehill Creek at the south end. There are also many small springtime meltwater tributaries that feed the lake. Eyehill Creek originates in neighbouring Alberta from Sounding Lake. Manitou Lake and its tributaries are part of a closed basin watershed. When the lake level rises high enough, it overflows to the north through Wells Lake near Marsden and then into the Battle River, which is a tributary of the North Saskatchewan River. This has happened only once since settlers arrived in the area, and that was in approximately 1905.

Lake levels were relatively constant until 1980 and have been declining rapidly since then by approximately one metre every six years. Less annual snowfall and heavier utilization of water from the Eyehill Creek system by urban, industrial, and agricultural users is blamed for this trend.

Along the southern shore of the lake are the Manitou Sand Hills. The hills total 420 km^{2} (105,000 acres) of Crown grazing land set aside by the Saskatchewan government.

There are no communities on the lake's shore. The nearest communities are Marsden, about 6.5 kilometres (4.0 mi) north of the north-west corner of the lake in the RM of Manitou Lake, and Neilburg, about 6.5 kilometres (4.0 mi) north of the north-east corner of the lake in the RM of Hillsdale, along Highway 40. At the lake's North-West Bay, there is Big Manitou Regional Park. Originally founded as part of Suffern Lake Regional Park in 1975, it became its own independent regional park in 2019. The park features camping, cabins, picnicking, swimming, and the Manitou Lake Golf Club. Just to the east of the regional park, is Manitou Lake Bible Camp.

== Manitou Lake Area IBA ==
The Manitou Lake Area (includes Reflex, Freshwater, Wells, Colette and Cipher Lakes) (SK 089) IBA of Canada encompasses Manitou Lake itself and several smaller nearby lakes—including two in Alberta. It also covers the 7252-hectare Artland Sandhills, which are to the west of Manitou Lake. Freshwater and Wells Lakes are entirely within Saskatchewan, and Cipher and Colette are in Alberta. Reflex Lake straddles the border. The lakes are important habitat for birds such as the piping plover, red-necked phalarope, sanderling, stilt sandpiper, ruddy turnstone, redhead, red knot, lesser scaup, and the dunlin. Around Manitou Lake, six specific areas covering over half the shoreline have been "designated as critical Piping Plover habitat", which protects the shoreline up to the highwater mark from development.

== See also ==
- List of lakes of Saskatchewan
