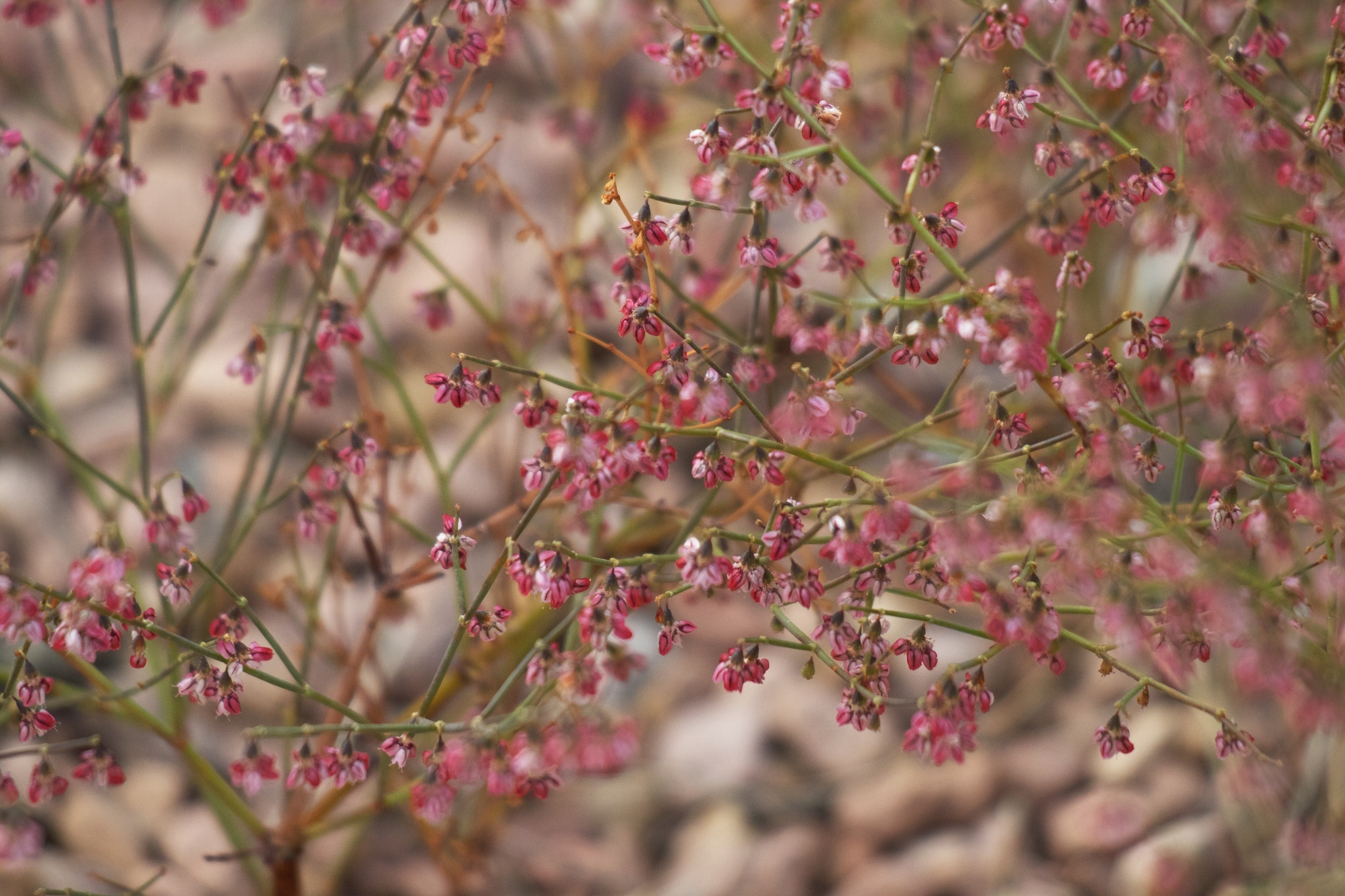

Scientific classification
- Kingdom: Plantae
- Clade: Tracheophytes
- Clade: Angiosperms
- Clade: Eudicots
- Order: Caryophyllales
- Family: Polygonaceae
- Genus: Eriogonum
- Species: E. deflexum

Binomial name
- Eriogonum deflexum Torr.

= Eriogonum deflexum =

Species of wild buckwheat

Eriogonum deflexum is a species of wild buckwheat known by the common names flatcrown buckwheat, flat-top buckwheat, and skeletonweed. This plant is native to the southwestern United States and northwestern Mexico, where it is common and grows in a variety of habitats, especially desert scrub. It is somewhat weedy where it is most abundant. This is an annual which varies in size from small patches on the ground to tangled bushes approaching two meters in height; it may be dense or thin and spindly. This is a brown or greenish weedy-looking herb with a many-branched stem. The leaves are located at the base of the plant and are rounded and woolly and one to four centimeters long. Small clusters of flowers appear at intervals along the branches with each flower only one to three millimeters wide and white or pinkish in color.
