= Prairie Farm Rehabilitation Administration =

The Prairie Farm Rehabilitation Administration (PFRA) was a branch under Agriculture and Agri-Food Canada (AAFC), a department of the Federal Government of Canada.

The Prairie Farm Rehabilitation Administration was established by an Act of Parliament under Prime Minister R. B. Bennett in 1935 in response to the widespread drought, farm abandonment and land degradation of the 1930s. Its mandate was to:

... secure the rehabilitation of the drought and soil drifting areas in the Provinces of Manitoba, Saskatchewan and Alberta, and to develop and promote within those areas, systems of farm practice, tree culture, water supply, land utilization and land settlement that will afford greater economic security...

With this mandate, the PFRA served to promote sustainable development on the rural prairies for over seven decades in the areas of air, water, soils, and biodiversity. Its mandate included detailed examination of various methods for soil conservation and enrichment.

The PFRA tree nursery at Indian Head, Saskatchewan, which opened in 1901, distributed tree seedlings free of charge to prairie farmers to promote shelterbelt planting to reduce soil erosion caused by wind. PFRA also operated a network of Community Pastures across the prairies, which provided grazing for cattle and reproductive services on a cost-recovery basis.

PFRA was also responsible for promoting and developing water supply projects across the prairie provinces, which included providing technical and financial assistance for individual farm water supply projects such as dugouts, wells, and pipelines, through a network of offices located across the Canadian prairie provinces. PFRA also planned and developed large scale, multi-use projects such as the St. Mary River irrigation district, the Bow River Irrigation Project, and the South Saskatchewan River Project (Gardiner Dam/Lake Diefenbaker). PFRA was also responsible for the development of numerous community water supplies across the Canadian Prairies, and built and operated a network of flood irrigation projects in southwestern Saskatchewan.

PFRA expanded its role in promoting soil conservation in the 1980s, staffing agrologists in most field offices to provide expertise and administer funding programs, such as the Permanent Cover Program, which provided funding to farmers in exchange for seeding marginal lands to forages and grasses for extended periods. PFRA also promoted rural development in the 1990s, becoming involved in a diverse range of activities intended to create value-added enterprises (e.g., agroforestry, aquaculture) across the Canadian prairies.

In 2008, PFRA was integrated with the National Land and Water Information Service (NLWIS) and Agri-Environmental Policy Bureau (AEPB), as part of the Agri-Environment Services Branch (AESB).

The Deficit Reduction Action Plan, which was part of the Federal Budget of 2011, mandated departments to identify savings proposals amounting to 5% and 10% of their total operating and grants and contributions expenditures. In 2012, the Federal government announced that it would be ending the Community Pastures Program. Shortly afterward, PFRA's field offices were phased out and workforce adjustment was implemented.

Federal funding for the PFRA's shelterbelt program to provide free seedlings of trees and shrubs to prairie farmers was discontinued in 2013 by the Conservative Federal Minister of Agriculture, Gerry Ritz, thus ending a long era of very low cost erosion and drought control measures throughout the prairies.
