= Lucky Strike, Alberta =

Lucky Strike
- Locality
- Location of Lucky Strike in Alberta
- Coordinates: 49.2034°N 111.4892°W
- Country: Canada
- Province: Alberta
- Region: Southern Alberta
- Census division: 2
- Municipal district: County of Warner No. 5

Government
  - Governing body: County of Warner No. 5 Council
- Time zone: UTC−06:00 (Alberta Time)
- Postal code span: T0K 2P0
- Area code: +1-403
- Highways: Highway 501
- Waterways: Smith Coulee

Lucky Strike was a locality in the County of Warner No. 5, Alberta, Canada located on Highway 501. As of the 21st century, the toponym is used to refer geographically to the original site. It is approximately 26 km (16 mi) east of Milk River, 20 km (12 mi) northeast of Writing-on-Stone Provincial Park, and 18 km (11 mi) south of Foremost.

== Toponymy ==
Researchers have recorded at least two explanations for Lucky Strike's name. A version accepted by the Geographical Names Board of Canada holds that early settlers named the locality because "those who obtained land [there] were considered to be fortunate". Geographer Frank Jankunis categorizes Lucky Strike as one of several early localities in southern Alberta with names that "reflect the aspirations of the pioneers [for] their communities"; other examples include Faith and Success.

Another common version provides that Lucky Strike was named when a prospective homesteader, who was surveying the area's available land on a rainy and windy day, successfully lit a pipe with the only match he had. Other members of the group he was travelling with agreed he had enjoyed a "lucky strike".

== Topography ==
Lucky Strike falls within both the Verdigris Plain and the Lucky Strike Upland, areas of gently rolling terrain formed by ancient glacial activity. The landscape contains some hummocks, and scattered outcrops of rock. Soils are generally well-suited to agriculture, though some are highly saline.

=== Flora and fauna ===
As of 2024, the invasive caragana plant grows in Lucky Strike's vicinity. The area also hosts populations of badgers and Richardson's ground squirrels.

== History ==
=== Founding: 1908–1910 ===
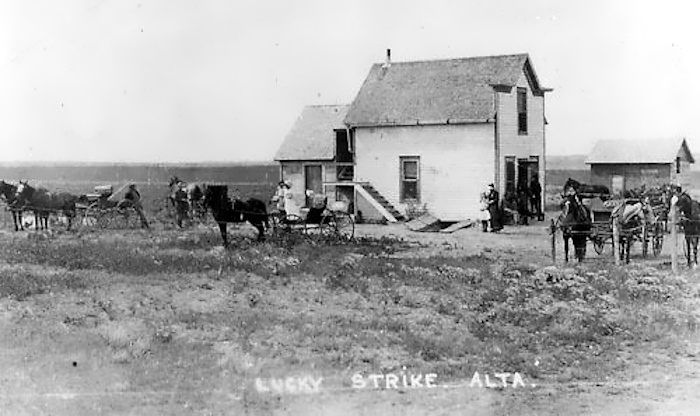
A homestead in Lucky Strike, Alberta, photographed shortly after the area opened up on January 10, 1910.

Lucky Strike and surrounding areas officially opened for settlement on January 10, 1910, but some settlers had already established homesteads as squatters. One such couple was Emma and Nathaniel Kingsbury, who first settled in the area that would become known as Lucky Strike in 1908. Lucky Strike formally became the community's name in January 1910, when Emma Kingsbury opened a post office by that title.

The Kingsburys also ran a hostel and general store, the Lucky Strike Sleeping and Eating Emporium; the latter contained a dance hall. Because many early immigrants to Lucky Strike were from the United States, the hall hosted annual events to celebrate both July 4 (American Independence Day) and July 1 (Canada Day) for some decades. Emma Kingsbury additionally served as the district's returning officer during elections; in this role, she helped illiterate locals to fill out their ballots.

The community was established enough by 1910 that a local carpenter built a schoolhouse, Prairie Round School, located 4.8 km (3.0 mi) west of the Lucky Strike Emporium. The building doubled as a place of worship for various congregations in the area until its closure in 1929.

=== Discovery of coal and development: 1911–1945 ===
Coal was discovered in coulees within 20 km (12 mi) of Lucky Strike in 1911. According to the Government of Alberta, the Lucky Strike coal field proved to be "the most productive coal field in the southern part" of the Taber-Manyberries area over the next four decades. Mines brought employment opportunities for farmers in the area, and made Lucky Strike a commercial hub for the district while mining was underway.

While the coal industry developed, the number of homesteaders arriving in the region started to slow down. A period of mild weather since the start of the century gave way to dry and volatile conditions, making farms harder to sustain. Nonetheless, Lucky Strike residents established a series of services throughout the year 1913, including a community well, Lucky Strike School, and Prairie Round Cemetery, established beside the existing Prairie Round School. Lucky Strike School served as a venue for various religious services, and railway services reached nearby Foremost that same year.

Alberta Government Telephones brought telephone services to Lucky Strike in 1918. Members of the Lucky Strike Women's Institute (itself established in 1936) voted to dissolve and become the Lucky Strike Community Club in 1939. Volunteers who joined the club tended to Prairie Round Cemetery, held raffles, organized dances, and, during the Second World War, hosted "welcome home" parties for returning veterans.

=== Decline and withdrawal of provincial recognition: 1946–2000 ===
Coal production began to decline in Alberta during the late 1940s, as major railways switched from using coal to diesel. Mining communities similarly declined, as miners moved elsewhere for work or social support.

The Kingsbury family sold Lucky Strike's post office in 1948 to Maurine and Morrison Look, who moved the attached general store from the Kingsbury's farm to a new location half a mile away. Meanwhile, the vacant Prairie Round School building was moved into Lucky Strike to become Lucky Strike Community Hall. The facility began to host Sunday school gatherings, as well as religious services by visiting pastors, including United Church of Canada ministers from nearby Foremost.

1948 also saw the closure of Lucky Strike School, owing to a shortage of students and difficulty finding teachers who would move to the rural locality. Lucky Strike Mine closed the following year, and most of the area's original mining operations ceased by 1954. A local family bought Lucky Strike School in 1956 for $251 ($2,882 in constant dollars) and moved it to their farm.

Lucky Strike's final postmistress, Olive Fitzpatrick, assumed the role in June 1964, only to step down in late 1965. No suitable replacement could be found, owing to the locality's small population, and the post office closed permanently in December. Prairie Round Cemetery received its final interment in 1969.

On April 28, 1970, the Government of Alberta rescinded recognition of Lucky Strike as a named locality, and religious services in Lucky Strike Community Hall ended two years later due to poor attendance. The Lucky Strike Community Association remained active, in particular by maintaining Prairie Round Cemetery, until it folded sometime after 1999.

=== 21st century: 2001–present ===
Lucky Strike was one of several farming communities in the Writing-on-Stone region, including Masinasin and Clarinda, that did not survive into the 21st century. The dormant Lucky Strike Community Hall was held by a local organization until 2023, when Warner County demolished the facility at their request.

== Places of interest ==
Prairie Round Cemetery, which received interments between 1913 and 1969, remains accessible to the public as of 2026. Warner County installed a sign for the cemetery in 2023, and maintained it until 2024. The graveyard has since been deemed inactive and abandoned by the county.

== Notable residents ==
- Leonard Halmrast – resident of Lucky Strike and member of the Legislative Assembly of Alberta from 1945 to 1967; held positions in Premier Ernest Manning's cabinet from 1953 to 1967

== See also ==
- List of communities in Alberta
- List of ghost towns in Alberta
