= Clarinda, Alberta =

Former unincorporated community in Canada

Clarinda
- Former settlement
- Former site of Clarinda in Alberta
- Coordinates: 49°03′N 111°43′W
- Country: Canada
- Province: Alberta
- Region: Southern Alberta
- Census division: Division No. 2, Alberta
- County: County of Warner No. 5
- Post office established: 1911
- Recognition rescinded by Government of Alberta: May 28, 1970
- Time zone: UTC−7 (MST)
  - Summer (DST): UTC−6 (MDT)
- Highways: Alberta Highway 500

Clarinda is a former unincorporated community in southern Alberta, Canada, within the County of Warner No. 5. It was located north of Highway 500, south of Highway 501, southeast of Milk River, and east of Coutts. The Clarinda site is approximately 60 km (37 mi) southeast of Lethbridge.

== Toponymy ==
Clarinda was named by the settlement's first postmistress, Frankie Clark, after the middle name of her mother, Theresa Clarinda Clark (née Coughlin). Theresa claimed to be a cousin of Charles Coughlin, a Catholic priest and radio personality who later became a Nazi sympathizer.

== Topography ==
The Clarinda site is part of the Milk River Ridge, specifically located within the Verdigris Plain. Soil is predominantly loam to clay loam, with no peat deposits. Clarinda's gently rolling terrain of ground moraine and isolated ridges transitions into steeper hills along the Verdigris Coulee. The area is unsuitable for irrigation, as water cannot be distributed uniformly due to its associated steep slopes.

=== Flora and fauna ===
As part of the Milk River Ridge, the Clarinda site is a breeding ground for sharp-tailed grouse, ferruginous hawks, and golden eagles. Modest populations of elk and grizzly bears also reside in the area. Native plants include the western blue flag, intermediate hawk’s-beard, and Raymond’s sedge.

In 1952, farms in the Clarinda and Coutts area became the first to report the presence of the lucerne plant bug in Canada. The United States Department of Agriculture described the insects as "abundant on cultivated mustard" growing in the area.

== History ==
=== Pre-settlement ===
The former site of Clarinda is within 7 km of Writing-on-Stone Provincial Park, which contains nearly 100 distinct sites of rock art by Indigenous peoples, created prior to permanent settlements in the area. The Milk River area was historically used as a hunting ground by Blackfoot Confederacy peoples, particularly the Amskapi Piikani.

=== Settlement and abandonment: 1900–1970 ===
Settlement began in Clarinda and surrounding areas in the early 20th century. The townsite was within 20 km of the localities of Masinasin, St. Kilda and Kippenville, all of which similarly did not survive into the 21st century. Clarinda had expanded enough by July 1911 that it received a post office, initially operated by Frankie Clark. Clarinda School also opened in the summer of that year, to an initial enrolment of 20 students; it received a permanent school building in 1912.

In November 1916, Clarinda received local media attention when Frankie Clark sued a customer, Duncan McDonald, for his use of "slanderous language". After the court found that McDonald had spread baseless rumours about Clark tampering with mail, William L. Walsh awarded her damages of $25 ($613 in constant dollars).

The Writing-on-Stone district began to decline in the 1920s and 1930s, as dry weather caused farmers to vacate the area in search of better agricultural conditions. Clarinda School closed in 1938, and students were transported by bus to Coutts for education instead. The building remained in use as a community hall during the Second World War. Clarinda's post office closed in May 1946 due to "limited usefulness", though some farms continued to operate in the vicinity until at least 1952.

On May 28, 1970, the provincial government rescinded recognition of Clarinda as a locality. The toponym is retained in the 21st century for historical reference, and for reference by regional services.

== See also ==
- List of communities in Alberta
