= Allerston, Alberta =

Allerston
- Unincorporated community
- Location within Alberta
- Coordinates: 49.1445°N 111.7642°W
- Country: Canada
- Province: Alberta
- Region: Southern Alberta
- Census division: 2
- Municipal district: County of Warner No. 5

Government
  - Governing body: Warner County Council
  - MP: Jim Hillyer
  - MLA: Gary Bikman
- Time zone: UTC−06:00 (Alberta Time)
- Postal code span: List of T Postal Codes of Canada
- Area code: +1-403
- Highways: Highway 501

Allerston, formerly Allersville, is an unincorporated community in Alberta, Canada within the County of Warner No. 5. It is located approximately 25 km (16 mi) east of the Town of Milk River and 18 km (11 mi) north of the Canada–US border on Township Road 24, 1 km (0.62 mi) off Highway 501.

The community has the name of Jacob Allers, a pioneer citizen.

All that remains of Allerston is a Roman Catholic Church and the Allerston Hall with baseball diamonds. The church was built in 1911 and opened on July 28, 1912. The church is still in use today. It was moved to a new foundation 20 ft (6.1 m) to the north. There is a cemetery behind the church. The Allerston Hall is still use for the annual Fall Bazar.

== Attractions ==
Writing-on-Stone Provincial Park, is one of the largest areas of protected prairie in the Alberta park system, and serves as both a nature preserve and protection for the largest concentration of rock art, created by Plains People. There are over 50 rock art sites, with thousands of figures, as well as numerous archeological sites.

== See also ==
- List of communities in Alberta
- Roman Catholic Diocese of Calgary
