= St Kilda =

St Kilda may refer to:

== Australia ==
- St Kilda, Queensland, a locality in Bundaberg Region
- St Kilda, South Australia, suburb of Adelaide, Australia
- St Kilda, Victoria, suburb of Melbourne, Australia
  - City of St Kilda, former municipality in Melbourne
  - Electoral district of St Kilda, a state electoral district abolished in 1992
  - St Kilda light rail station, Melbourne
  - St Kilda Cricket Club
  - St Kilda Football Club, Australian-rules football club established in 1873
  - St Kilda Saints (NBL) or Southern Melbourne Saints, Australian National Basketball League team

== Canada ==
- St. Kilda, Alberta, unincorporated community in Warner County, Alberta

== New Zealand ==
- St Kilda, New Zealand, suburb of Dunedin, New Zealand
  - St Kilda (New Zealand electorate), former New Zealand Parliamentary electorate

== Scotland ==
- St Kilda, Scotland, archipelago in the north Atlantic off the west coast of the Scottish mainland
  - St Kilda wren and St Kilda field mouse, endemic subspecies

== See also ==
- Lady of St Kilda, a schooner that the Melbourne suburb was named after
