= Fresno Dam =

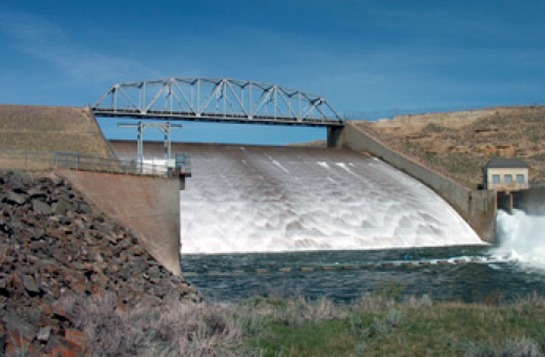
- Fresno Dam
- Interactive map of Fresno Dam
- Country: United States
- Location: Hill County, Montana
- Coordinates: 48°36′05″N 109°56′40″W
- Construction began: 1937
- Opening date: 1939

Dam and spillways
- Type of dam: Earthfill
- Impounds: Milk River
- Height: 110 ft (34 m)
- Length: 2,070 ft (630 m)
- Elevation at crest: 2,596 ft (791 m)
- Width (crest): 22 ft (6.7 m)
- Width (base): 726 ft (221 m)
- Dam volume: 2,105,000 yd^{3} (1,609,000 m^{3})
- Spillway type: Uncontrolled over-the-crest
- Spillway capacity: 51,360 cu ft/s (1,454 m^{3}/s)

Reservoir
- Creates: Fresno Reservoir
- Total capacity: 129,062 acre⋅ft (159,196,000 m^{3})
- Surface area: 7,388 acres (2,990 ha)

Fresno Dam is a dam on the Milk River, a tributary of the Missouri River, upstream of Havre, Montana. The dam is part of the Milk River Project, owned by the U.S. Bureau of Reclamation. It serves mainly to provide irrigation water and some of its capacity is also reserved for flood control. The dam was built between 1937 and 1939, and raised and overhauled in 1943 and 1951.
