= County of Warner No. 5 =

Municipal district in Alberta, Canada

Coordinates: 49°16′34″N 112°06′43″W

Warner No. 5
- Municipal district
- County of Warner No. 5
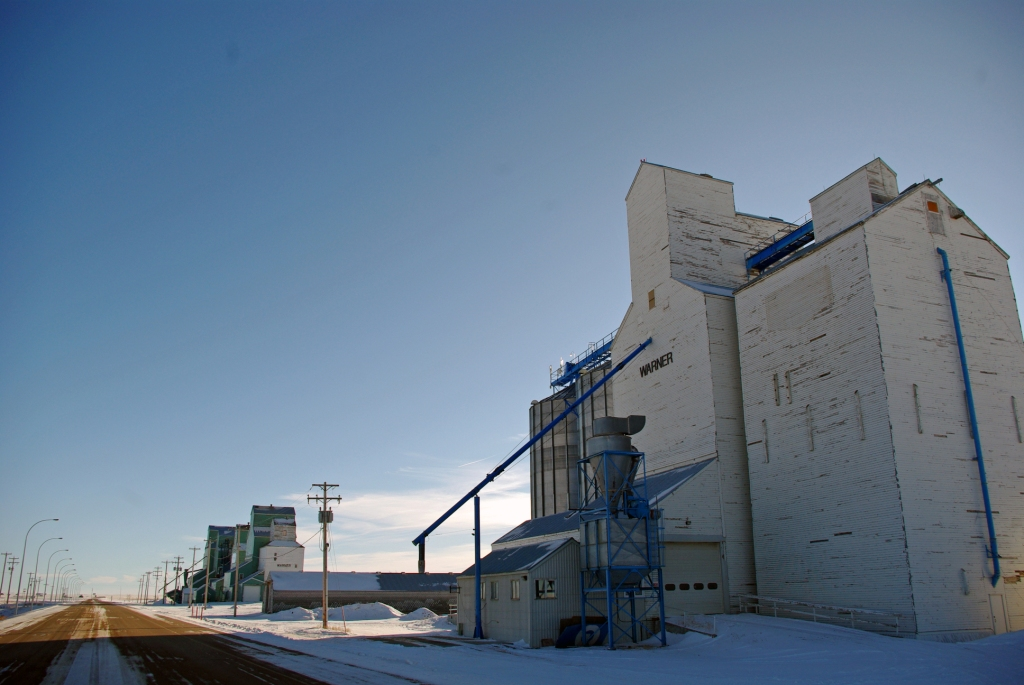
- Last surviving elevator row in Alberta, located in Warner

- Logo

- Location within Alberta
- Country: Canada
- Province: Alberta
- Region: Southern Alberta
- Planning region: South Saskatchewan
- Established: 1912
- Incorporated: 1950

Government
  - Reeve: Randy Taylor
  - Governing body: County of Warner Council
  - Administrative office: Warner

Area (2021)
  - Land: 4,462.2 km^{2} (1,722.9 sq mi)

Population (2021)
  - Total: 4,290
  - Density: 1/km^{2} (2.6/sq mi)
- Time zone: UTC−06:00 (Alberta Time)
- Website: warnercounty.ca

The County of Warner No. 5 is a municipal district in southern Alberta, Canada. Located in Census Division No. 2 just north of the United States border, its municipal office is located in the Village of Warner.

== History ==
- 1912 – Warner was originally organised as a rural municipality.
- January, 1913 – Municipal District of Warner No. 36 incorporated.
- January 23, 1923 – Municipal District of Sugar City No. 37 incorporated.
- 1942 – Sugar City Municipality enlarged to include Local Improvement District No. 7 and portions of Local Improvement Districts 8, 38 and 67.
- January 6, 1950 – Warner Municipality enlarged to include Milk River, Coutts and Masinasin districts.
- December 31, 1953 – Sugar City dissolved and portion added to the Municipal District of Warner.
- January 1, 1954 – County of Warner No. 5 incorporated.

== Geography ==
The County of Warner No. 5 comprises approximately 50 townships and is bordered on the south by the Canada-United States border. It is composed of the former Municipal District of Warner No. 36 and a portion of the former Municipal District of Sugar City No. 37.

=== Communities and localities ===
The following urban municipalities are surrounded by the County of Warner No. 5.

Cities

- none

Towns

- Milk River
- Raymond

Villages

- Coutts
- Stirling
- Warner

Summer villages

- none

The following hamlets are located within the County of Warner No. 5.

Hamlets

- New Dayton
- Wrentham

The following localities are located within the County of Warner No. 5.

Localities

- Clarinda
- Conrad
- Craddock
- Elmspring
- Judson
- Knappen
- Lucky Strike
- Masinasin
- Maybutt
- McNab
- Miami
- New Rockport
- St. Kilda

Other places

- Allerston (Doran)
- Mammoth
- One-Seventeen
- Two-Fifteen

== Demographics ==
In the 2021 Census of Population conducted by Statistics Canada, the County of Warner No. 5 had a population of 4,290 living in 907 of its 1,032 total private dwellings, a change of 8.8% from its 2016 population of 3,942. With a land area of 4,462.2 km^{2} (1,722.9 sq mi), it had a population density of 1.0/km^{2} (2.5/sq mi) in 2021.

In the 2016 Census of Population conducted by Statistics Canada, the County of Warner No. 5 had a population of 3,847 living in 816 of its 941 total private dwellings, a 0.2% change from its 2011 population of 3,841. With a land area of 4,531.55 km^{2} (1,749.64 sq mi), it had a population density of 0.8/km^{2} (2.2/sq mi) in 2016.

== Attractions ==
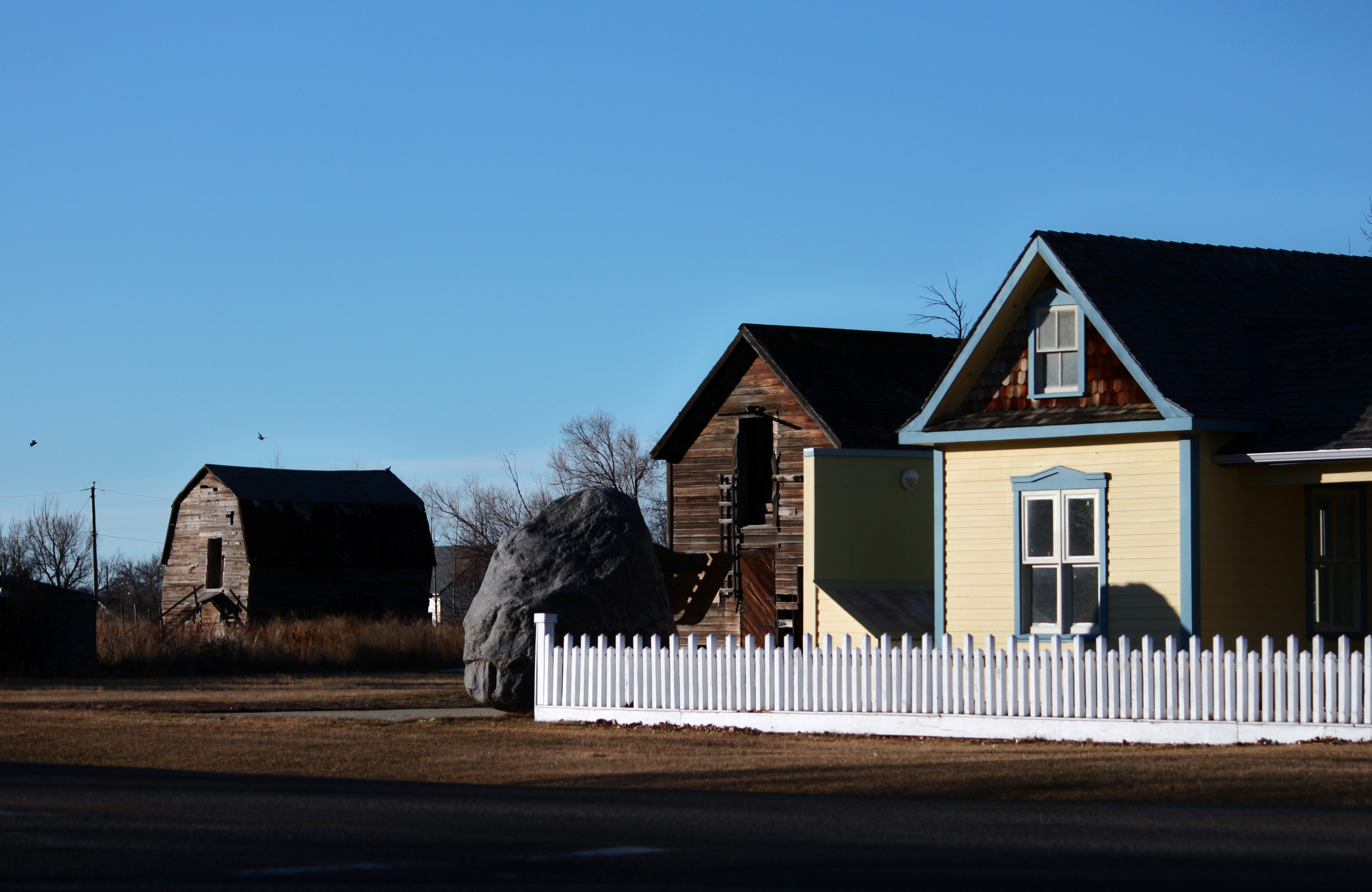
Stirling tourist information replica pioneer house and Bishop's storehouse

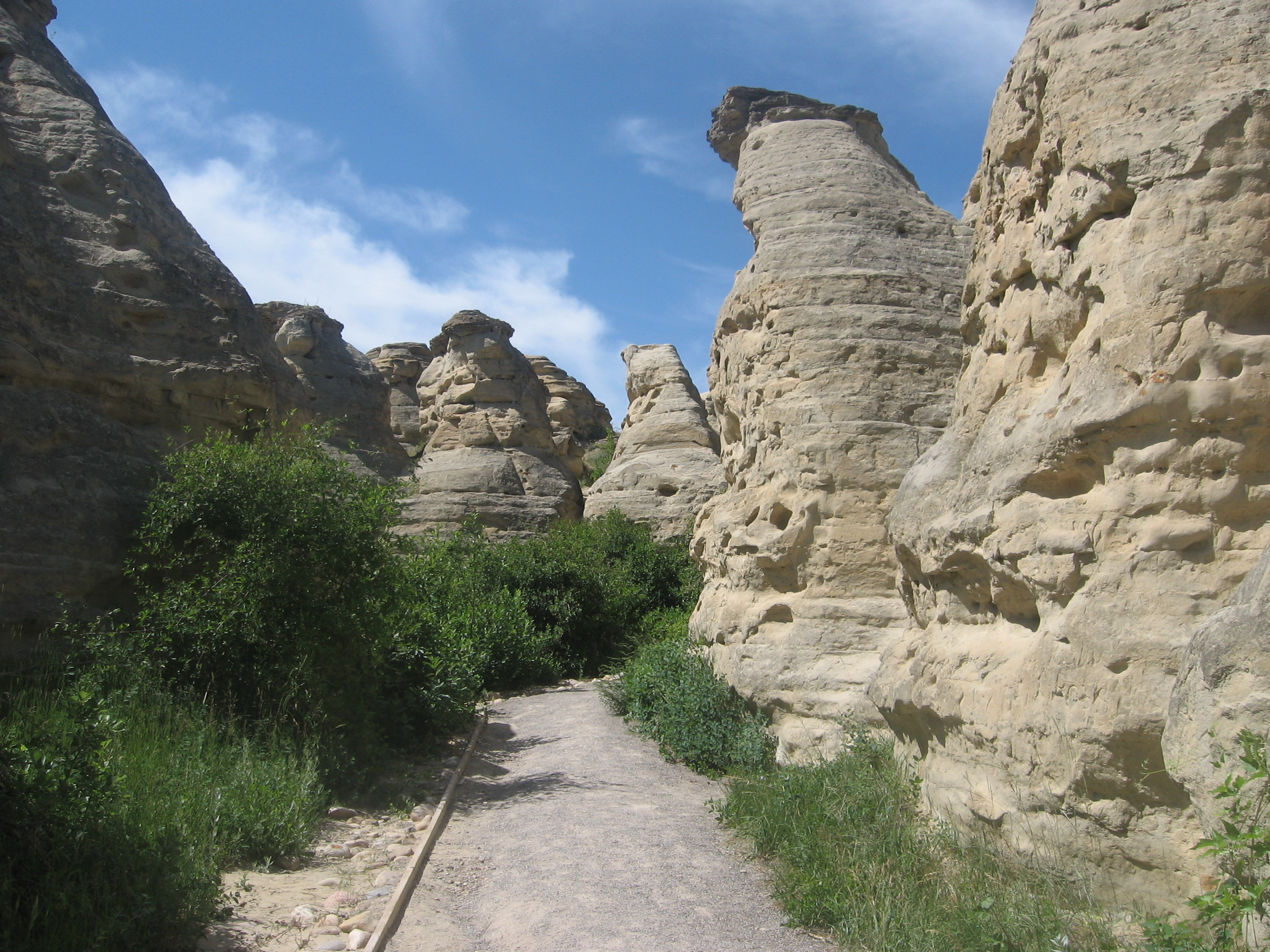
Writing-on-stone Provincial Park

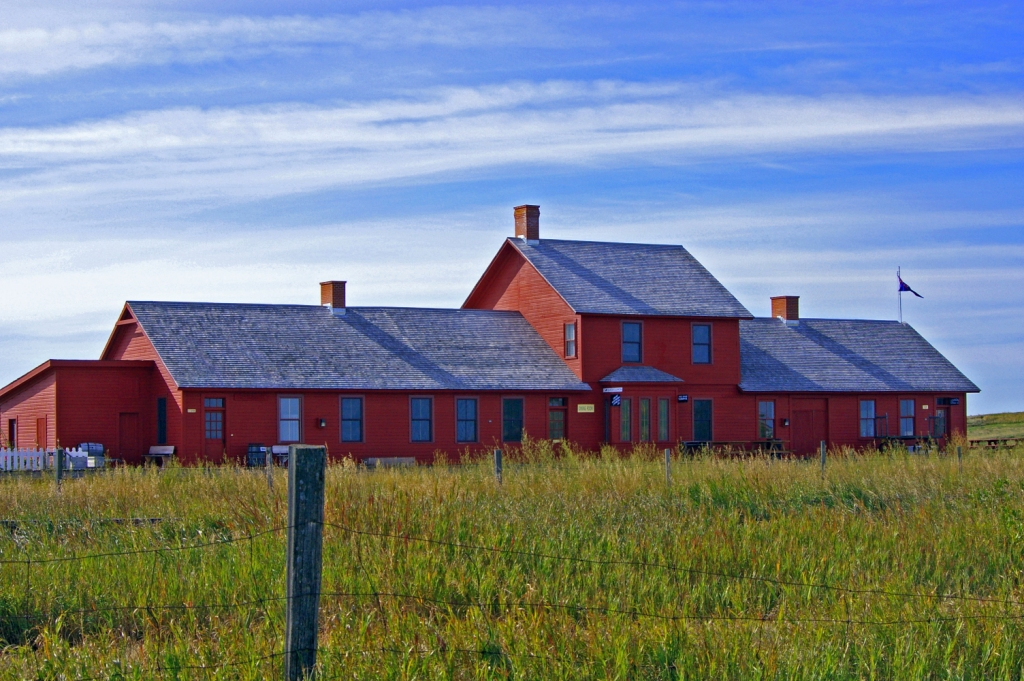
Galt Historic Railway Park

- Stirling Agricultural Village, National Historic Site of Canada
- Warner elevator row, last surviving "Grain Elevator Row" in Alberta.
- Galt Historic Railway Park
- Michelsen Farmstead
- William T. Ogden House
- Lost Frontier Mini-Railway
- Writing-on-Stone Provincial Park
- Devil's Coulee Dinosaur Heritage Museum
- Centennial Park
- Stirling Elevator
- Neils Hogenson House
- Andrew Larson House
- Temple Hill
- Raymond Golf Club
- Milk River Golf Club

=== Events ===
- Stirling Settler Days
- Victorian Prairie Christmas – Galt Railway Park
- Raymond Stampede
- Milk River Bonanza Days
- Coutts Days
- Warner Dino Days

== Education ==
Westwind School Division No. 74 and Horizon School Division No. 67 provide education within the boundaries of the County of Warner No. 5.

=== Early school districts ===
Listed below are the former school districts that once provided education within the County of Warner No. 5.

Name & SD No.	Image	Location	Date Established	Date Closed/ Disbanded	Notes
Galt/Stirling No. 647		29-6-19W4	19 November 1901		Originally named Galt, the name was changed to Stirling in 1957.
Raymond No. 700		8-6-20W4	1 May 1902		
Mammoth No. 1379		24-5-20W4	9 August 1905		
Warner No. 1675		10-4-17W4	31 July 1907		
Tyrells Lake No. 2007		20-5-17W4	8 July 1909	1939	Demolished 1940s
Milk River Valley/Masinasin No. 2024		15-2-13W4	24 August 1909		Originally named Milk River Valley, the name was changed to Masinasin in 1941.
Milk River No. 2056		15-2-13W4	8 October 1909		
Grain No. 2597		15-1-11W4	25 November 1911		
West Butte/St. Kilda No. 2747		11-1-12W4	25 May 1912		Originally named West Butte, the name was changed to St. Kilda in 1920.
Indian Rock No. 2540		18-1-12 W4 moved? to 11-1-12W4	25 August 1911		
Locke No. 2730		31-1-13 W4 Moved? to 28-2-13W4	10 May 1912		
Clarinda No. 2459		8-1-13 W4	10 June 1911		
Verburg No. 2439		33-1-14 W4	10 May 1911		
Sexton Creek No. 2510		9-1-14 W4 moved? to 33-1-14W4	24 July 1911		
Lind No. 2170		34-1-16 W4	25 April 1910		
John Joes No. 2198		24-1-17W4	26 May 1910		Also spelled John Jo
Two Fifteen No. 2153		20-2-15W4	26 March 1910 March 26		Moved to Milk River for a class room when the district was joined with Milk River Consolidated District 12, December 1945
Sleepy Hollow No. 2634		24-2-15W4	25 January 1912		
Lucky Strike No. 2589		17-3-11W4	9 November 1911		
Prairie Round No. 2152		21-3-12W4	26 March 1910 March 26		
Patience No. 2156		23-6-17W4	26 March 1910		
Maybutt		32-6-19W4	1910	1924	Classes were first held at the Presbyterian Church, a vacant Chinese restaurant and later the Prairie Queen Hotel at the corner of First Avenue and Front Street, Maybutt. Plans to build a school house never got past the planning stages and children from Maybutt were bused to the neighbouring town of Stirling in 1924.
Kippen No. 2080		34-2-12W4	9 December 1909	1933	Kippenville Consolidated 7 created in 1915 by Kippen & Green Villa disorganized in 1933
Bankview No. 3042		16-1-17W4	1913	1953	
Coutts No. 3560		4-1-15W4	30 October 1917		
North Wrentham No. 3618		7-16W4	18 February 1918		
Wrentham No. 3617		36-6-17W4	18 February 1918		
Conrad No. 4077		11-61-12W4	3 November 1921		

== See also ==
- List of communities in Alberta
- List of municipal districts in Alberta
