= McNab, Alberta =

McNab
- Unincorporated community
- Location within Alberta
- Coordinates: 49.2058°N 112.1725°W
- Country: Canada
- Province: Alberta
- Region: Southern Alberta
- Census division: 2
- Municipal district: County of Warner No. 5

Government
  - Governing body: Warner County Council
  - MP: Jim Hillyer
  - MLA: Gary Bikman
- Elevation: 935 m (3,068 ft)
- Time zone: UTC−06:00 (Alberta Time)
- Postal code span: List of T Postal Codes of Canada
- Area code: +1-403
- Highways: Highway 506
- Railways: Canadian Pacific Railway

McNab was an unincorporated community in southern Alberta, Canada, within the County of Warner No. 5. Its former site is located on Highway 506 between New Dayton and Warner, approximately 50 kilometres (31 mi) southeast of the City of Lethbridge.

== Toponymy ==
McNab's name derives from Thomas McNabb, master mechanic of the Alberta Railway and Irrigation Company and Lethbridge-based politician.

== Topography ==
Soil in the McNab area consists of silty clay loam with an underdeveloped topsoil. Its terrain is also strongly saline and poorly drained, making the area unsuitable for most vegetation.

=== Flora and fauna ===
Plant life in the area is limited to species with a high tolerance for salt, such as foxtail barley. Animals native to the area include skunks, coyotes, and badgers. The endangered northern leopard frog has also been spotted in McNab.

== History ==
McNab was established as a railway siding in 1913, and soon thereafter received a grain elevator to serve local farms. Residents sourced goods from general stores in nearby Warner or travelled to Lethbridge for more complex items and services.

As a predominantly agricultural community, McNab's early growth was stunted by the Great Depression and the Dust Bowl's drought conditions. Because farms in McNab were not irrigated, a lack of rain throughout the 1930s prevented crops from growing, and the area began to depopulate.

McNab's name was accepted for provincial mapping purposes in December 1939, and has remained in use for the area since. The settlement's grain elevator ceased operations in 1983, and the elevator was demolished sometime after November 2005.

As of 2026, nothing remains of the original McNab townsite. The area now hosts several agricultural operations. The McNab railway siding remains in use by the Canadian Pacific Railway's freight services.

== See also ==
- List of communities in Alberta
- List of unincorporated communities in Alberta
