= Milk River (Alberta–Montana) =

River in Alberta, Canada and Montana, United States

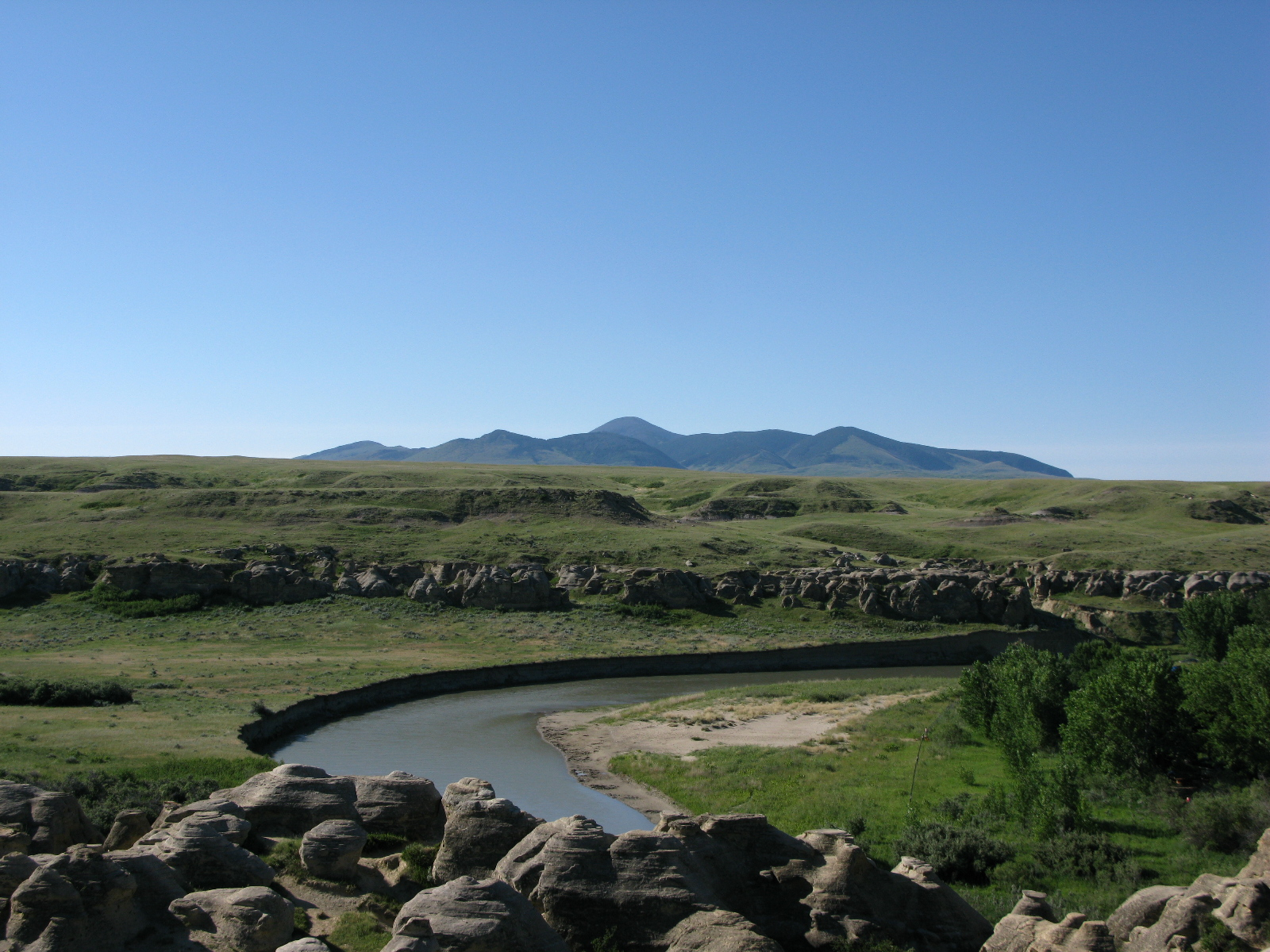
- The Milk River in Writing-on-Stone Provincial Park

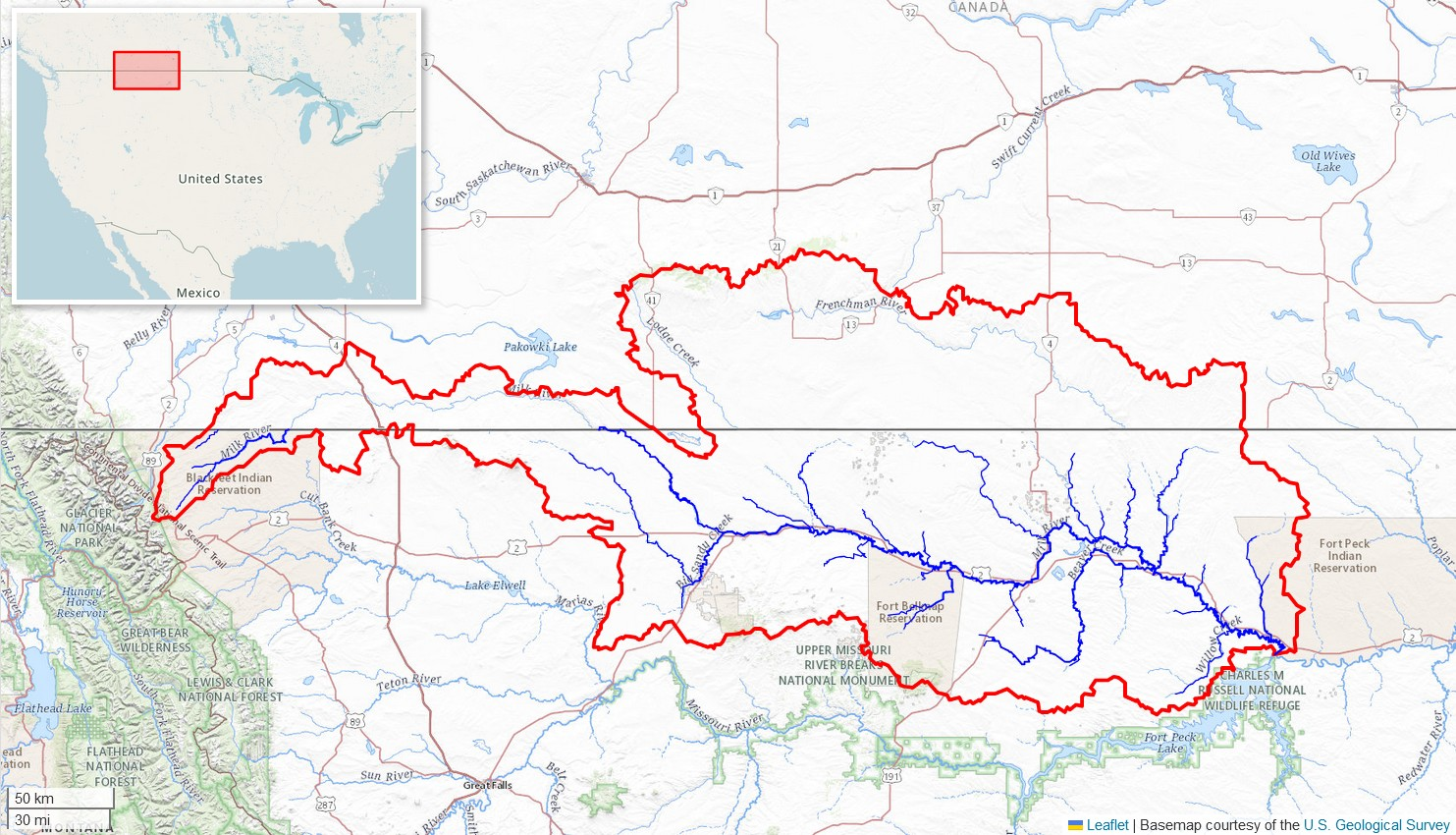
- Milk River watershed (Interactive map)

- Location of mouth in Montana Milk River (Alberta–Montana) (the United States)
- Etymology: Named by the Lewis and Clark Expedition for its milky color

Location
- Countries: United States and Canada
- State: Montana
- Province: Alberta

Physical characteristics
- Source: Confluence of South and Middle Forks
  - location: Glacier County, Montana
  - coordinates: 48°51′20″N 113°01′10″W
  - elevation: 4,403 ft (1,342 m)
- Mouth: Missouri River
  - location: Valley County, Montana
  - coordinates: 48°03′26″N 106°19′07″W
  - elevation: 2,024 ft (617 m)
- Length: 729 mi (1,173 km)
- Basin size: 23,800 sq mi (62,000 km^{2})
- Discharge
  - location: Nashua, Montana, 22.7 mi (36.5 km) from the mouth
  - average: 618 cu ft/s (17.5 m^{3}/s)
  - minimum: 0 cu ft/s (0 m^{3}/s)
  - maximum: 45,300 cu ft/s (1,280 m^{3}/s)

The Milk River is a tributary of the Missouri River, 729 miles (1,173 km) long, in the U.S. state of Montana and the Canadian province of Alberta. Rising in the Rocky Mountains, the river drains a sparsely populated, semi-arid watershed of 23,800 square miles (62,000 km^{2}), ending just east of Fort Peck, Montana.

== Geography ==
It is formed in Glacier County in northwestern Montana, 21 miles (34 km) north of Browning, Montana, by the confluence of its South and Middle forks. The 30-mile (48 km) long South Fork and 20-mile (32 km) long Middle Fork both rise in the Rocky Mountains just east of Glacier National Park, in the Blackfeet Indian Reservation. Much of the water in the North Fork is diverted from the St. Mary River through a canal and inverted siphon.

The main stream flows east-northeast into southern Alberta, where it is joined by the North Fork of the Milk River, from there It flows past the town of Milk River and Writing-on-Stone Provincial Park, then turns southeast into Montana, running east along the north side of the Sweetgrass Hills, turning south, passing through the Fresno Dam, then east past Havre and along the north side of the Fort Belknap Indian Reservation. Near Malta, it turns north, then southeast, flowing past Glasgow and joining the Missouri in Valley County, Montana, 5 miles (8 km) downstream from Fort Peck Dam.

The watershed of the river extends into the Canadian provinces of Alberta and Saskatchewan and the US state of Montana. The watershed of the river covers an area of 61,642 km^{2} (23,800 mi^{2}). Of this 6,500 km^{2} (2,510 mi^{2}) lies in Alberta, 14,942 km^{2} (5,769 mi^{2}) in Saskatchewan and the remaining in Montana. The area in Alberta and Saskatchewan is one of the few parts of the Mississippi River watershed that extends into Canada.

River	Location	Discharge
North Fork Milk River	US-Canada Border	99 cu ft/s (2.8 m^{3}/s)
South Fork Milk River	near Browning	98 cu ft/s (2.8 m^{3}/s)
Milk River	Nashua	618 cu ft/s (17.5 m^{3}/s)

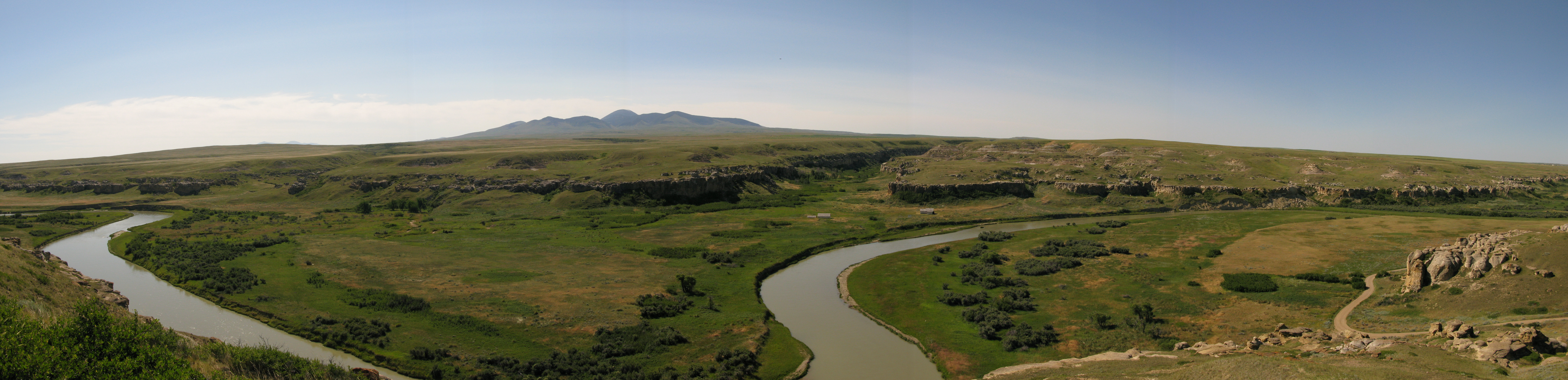
The Milk River in Writing-on-Stone Provincial Park

== History ==
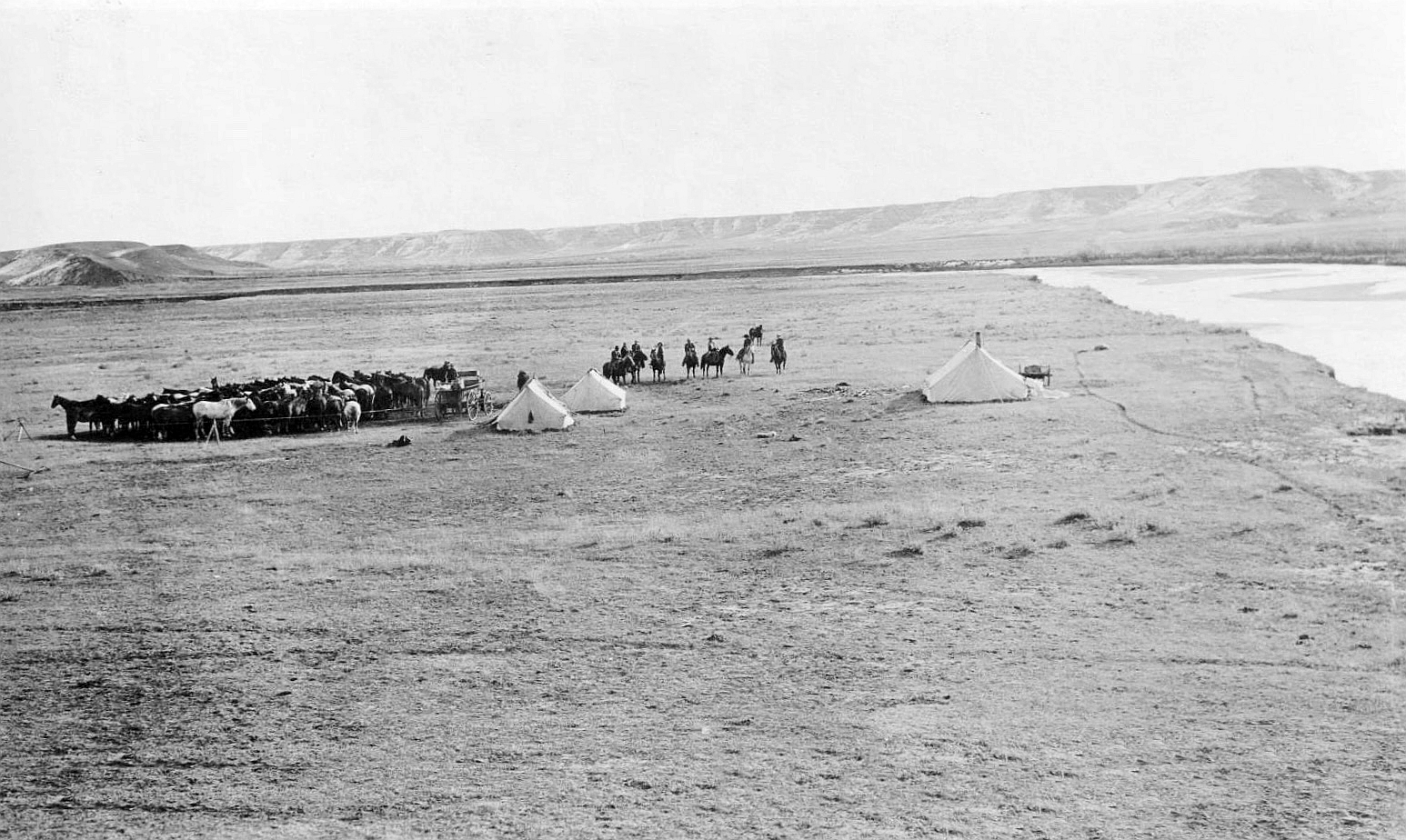
Alberta round-up camp next to river, 1912

The Milk River was given its name by Captain Meriwether Lewis, of the Lewis and Clark Expedition, who described the river in his journal:

The water of this river possesses a peculiar whiteness, being about the colour of a cup of tea with the admixture of a tablespoon full of milk. from the colour of its water we called it Milk river.

This appearance results from clays and silts suspended in its waters. These fine-grained sediments result from the erosion of soft clay-rich rocks along the Milk River basin in southern Alberta, such as the Foremost, Oldman and Dinosaur Park formations.

At the time of Lewis's exploration, the Milk River drainage was legally part of the United States as a component of the Louisiana Purchase. However, in 1818 U.S. negotiators swapped a portion of the Milk River watershed that lay north of 49° north latitude, receiving in exchange for a parcel of Red River of the North drainage that had previously been part of British North America.

The project to take water from St. Mary River into the north fork was authorized in 1905. It provides drinking water to 14,000 municipal users and irrigation to 120,000 acres (49,000 ha) of ranchland along Montana's Hi-Line region. In 1908, the waters of the Milk River were the subject of a United States Supreme Court case clarifying the water rights of the Fort Belknap Indian Reservation. This precedent setting ruling for Indian reservations is known as Winters v. United States.

== Habitat ==
The Milk River area consists of three drainage basins — the Lost River Valley to the northeast, the Milk River in the middle, and the Kennedy Coulee to the southeast. The landscape consists of native grasslands, riparian cottonwood groves, badlands, coulees, cliffs, sand dunes, and rocky outcrops. Birds in the area include the mountain plover, burrowing owl, sage grouse, loggerhead shrike, Sprague's pipit, long-billed curlew, ferruginous hawk, prairie falcon, willet, marbled godwit, lark bunting, Baird's sparrow, McCown's longspur, and the chestnut-collared longspur. The area also supports pronghorns, western hognose snakes, bull snakes, prairie rattlesnakes, and northern leopard frogs.

== Milk River Project ==
The Milk River Project is a project in Montana that diverts water from the St. Mary River across the continental divide to supply water to the Milk River for irrigation and other uses. The project irrigates 120,000 acres (49,000 ha) of farmland. On June 17, 2024, the "system suffered a major failure when the St. Mary siphon ruptured". The system was not operational again until the spring of 2026.

== See also ==
- Montana Stream Access Law
- List of longest rivers of Canada
- List of longest rivers of the United States (by main stem)
- List of rivers of Montana
- List of rivers of Alberta
- List of tributaries of the Missouri River
