= St. Kilda, Alberta =

Location of St. Kilda in Alberta

St. Kilda is a former unincorporated community in southern Alberta within Warner County. Located near the Alberta-Montana border, it was approximately 113 km (70 mi) southeast of Lethbridge. As of 2024, the sole remnant of the settlement is its abandoned schoolhouse.

== Toponymy ==
St. Kilda was named for the eponymous Scottish archipelago. Both the original St. Kilda and its Albertan namesake were abandoned by the mid-19th century. In 1930, the original St. Kilda's population of 35 people was moved to mainland Scotland.

== Biodiversity ==
The land that contained St. Kilda is home to populations of meadow voles, Osgood's mice, northern pocket gophers, and North American porcupines. Northern leopard frogs and eastern spadefoot toads have also been observed in the area.

== History ==
=== Founding and development: 1900-1919 ===
St. Kilda was established by predominantly Scottish settlers, including Donald McDougall, who named the locality after his place of origin. In July 1911, a post office named St. Kilda was opened by homesteader John Gilder, who served as its first postmaster. A school also opened that year, though it was initially named West Butte School District No. 2747, and would not be renamed to St. Kilda until the 1920s. After Gilder left the area in March 1914 in search of steadier work, St. Kilda received its next postmaster in January 1915.

=== Development and decline: 1920-1968 ===
St. Kilda generated interest in June 1928 after an oil well, estimated to be 1,000 feet deep, was struck near the settlement. Oil would not be investigated again in the area until 1953; neither venture proved permanent. In September 1929, the post office moved to the farmhouse of resident William Harvie.

St. Kilda became home to "one of the largest" ranches in Alberta due to the efforts of rancher George Graham Ross, who featured frequently in provincial media throughout the 1930s and 1940s. He came to prominence for running "one of the largest" ranches in Alberta, and his practice of inspecting his lands by flying over them in a de Havilland Puss Moth earned him the nickname of 'The Flying Rancher.' He also attracted national attention for the trust local pronghorns placed in him, as they would follow him around his ranch on occasion. Ross died in July 1956.

Postmaster Harvie's house and post office burned down in June 1938, though he rebuilt both, and continued to run the operation until his retirement in 1945. At this time, his homestead and post office were purchased by Mabel Archibald and her husband. Also that year, the St. Kilda School closed. The St. Kilda Society, which formed to purchase the vacant building in August 1952 for $400, used the building to host 'bowery dances,' so named because of the bowery concrete floor in the building, until the 1970s.

Archibald proved to be St. Kilda's final postmaster; its post office closed in July 1968, owing to "limited usefulness." As of 2024, the abandoned schoolhouse (and later dance hall) is all that remains of St. Kilda.

== See also ==
- List of communities in Alberta
