= Masinasin, Alberta =

Masinasin
- Unincorporated community
- Location in County of Warner Location in Alberta
- Coordinates: 49°9′8″N 111°40′35″W
- Country: Canada
- Province: Alberta
- Region: Southern Alberta
- Municipal district: Warner
- Founded: 1906

Government
- Time zone: UTC−06:00 (Alberta Time)
- Postal code span: TOK
- Area code: +1-403
- Highways: Highway 500; Highway 501

Masinasin is a ghost town and former community in Alberta, Canada within the County of Warner No. 5. It is located 1 km (0.62 mi) off Highway 501 on Range Road 133, approximately 31 km (19 mi) east of the Town of Milk River and 18 km (11 mi) north of the Canada–US border.

== Toponymy ==
Masinasin was likely named by a North-West Mounted Police officer stationed at an outpost in the area. The name derives from terms in the Cree language, as interpreted by settlers, meaning "writing on stone". (In Cree dialects, including Plains Cree, masinaham means "s/he writes" and asiniy means "stone".) Writing-on-Stone Provincial Park, located 8 km (5.0 mi) from Masinasin, has a similar etymological origin.

Although English speakers used Cree words to identify the area, it was primarily populated by Blackfoot groups before their arrival. There is less evidence that Cree groups frequented the region, not least of all because the Cree and Blackfoot were locked in a longstanding state of conflict before the 19th century. In the Blackfoot language, the region is known as Áísínai’pi ("it is pictured").

== History ==
=== Pre-settlement ===
For thousands of years, the Writing-on-Stone region was frequented by, and held spiritual importance for, groups constituting the Blackfoot Confederacy. Nearby Writing-on-Stone Provincial Park hosts the largest concentration of Indigenous rock artworks in North America, many of which date to 1050 BCE.

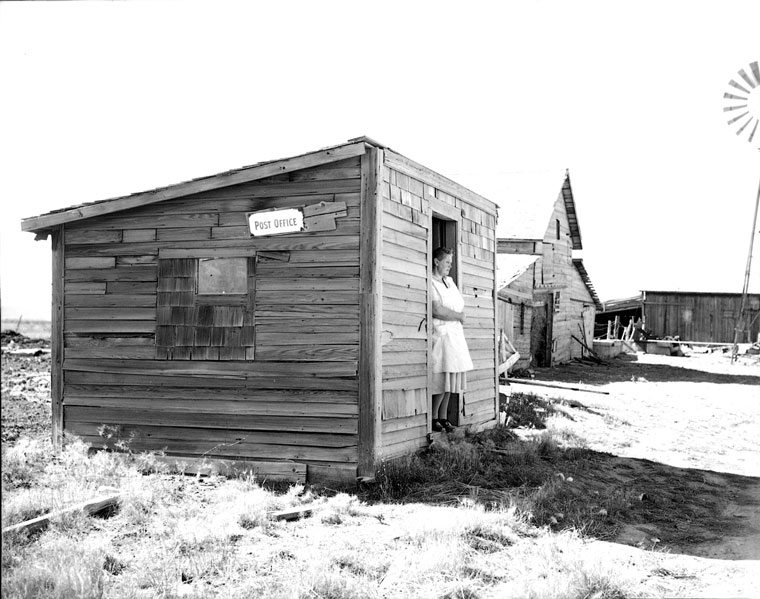
Postmaster Elizabeth Blust stands in Masinasin post office's doorway (c. 1934-1953). The building, a converted granary, served three postmasters.

=== Settlement and rescinded recognition: 1906–1980 ===
Masinasin first received permanent settlers of European origin around 1906. Postal services were provided through the nearby North-West Mounted Police outpost, until Masinasin received a dedicated post office in August 1909. A cemetery, situated 2.4 km (1.5 mi) from Masinasin's townsite, was founded around this time; it became attached to a Presbyterian church in 1918.

After the 1910s, weather in the region became dry and unconducive to agriculture, causing the early growth of Masinasin and surrounding localities to reverse. Its cemetery fell into disuse around 1930, and its church closed by 1936, when it was bought by the United Church of Canada. The United Church moved the building into the Masinasin townsite, where it was used as a community hall for some years.

In 1950, the municipal government of Warner instated a public health nurse to provide for residents of Masinasin and neighbouring localities. Before this service was introduced, Masinasin's locals relied on family doctors in Milk River for medical aid; they travelled to Lethbridge, over 100 km (62 mi) away, for more serious ailments. Masinasin School also received a new building in 1950, though its post office closed permanently in June 1956.

On April 24, 1970, the Government of Alberta rescinded its recognition of Masinasin as a named locality.

=== Later developments: 1981–present ===
Beginning in 1986, the Horizon School Division began to consider closing Masinasin School and transferring its students to schools in neighbouring localities. Families successfully convinced the board to keep the school open until March 8, 1996, when its Parental Advisory Council heard that Horizon School Division was prepared to fund only one teacher and one part-time teaching assistant for the school's anticipated enrolment of 20 students. The council voted unanimously to close Masinasin School, and students were transferred to Milk River by bus. The building was repurposed into a community centre.

In 2009, Stirling resident Cody Kapcsos discovered a gravestone in the vicinity of the original Masinasin site. Further investigation revealed an abandoned graveyard. Kapcsos restored the graveyard and installed a sign to mark Masinasin Cemetery. He also shared details of the interments he found online, which resulted in Minnesota resident Winnie Benson discovering the grave of her great-grandmother, Drusilla Ennis. Benson had been searching for Ennis' resting place for 25 years.

According to CBC News, remnants of the original Masinasin site are "virtually invisible" as of 2020. The toponym has remained in use by commercial and agricultural operations in the vicinity, as well as local services.

== Services and amenities ==
Masinasin Community Hall, still housed within the former Masinasin School building, remains in use as of 2026. The Masinasin Community Square Society received funding of $14,000 from Warner County in 2025 to renovate the facility.

Fire management and waste transfer services for the Masinasin area are provided through Warner County.

== Places of interest ==
Masinasin Cemetery remains accessible as of 2026, though it is considered abandoned and inactive by the County of Warner.

== Climate ==
Masinasin experiences a semi-arid, continental climate (Köppen climate classification BSk).

Climate data for Masinasin, Alberta
Month	Jan	Feb	Mar	Apr	May	Jun	Jul	Aug	Sep	Oct	Nov	Dec	Year
Record high °C (°F)	17 (63)	24 (75)	23 (73)	31.5 (88.7)	33.5 (92.3)	37 (99)	39 (102)	41 (106)	37 (99)	31 (88)	24 (75)	17.5 (63.5)	41 (106)
Mean daily maximum °C (°F)	−0.5 (31.1)	2.0 (35.6)	6.7 (44.1)	13.8 (56.8)	19.4 (66.9)	23.4 (74.1)	28.3 (82.9)	27.4 (81.3)	20.8 (69.4)	13.9 (57.0)	4.9 (40.8)	−0.8 (30.6)	13.3 (55.9)
Daily mean °C (°F)	−6.2 (20.8)	−4.1 (24.6)	0.4 (32.7)	6.6 (43.9)	11.9 (53.4)	16.0 (60.8)	19.7 (67.5)	18.9 (66.0)	13.2 (55.8)	7.1 (44.8)	−0.9 (30.4)	−6.6 (20.1)	6.3 (43.3)
Mean daily minimum °C (°F)	−12 (10)	−10.2 (13.6)	−5.8 (21.6)	−0.6 (30.9)	4.3 (39.7)	8.6 (47.5)	11.0 (51.8)	10.3 (50.5)	5.6 (42.1)	0.2 (32.4)	−6.6 (20.1)	−12.4 (9.7)	−0.6 (30.9)
Record low °C (°F)	−39 (−38)	−36.5 (−33.7)	−35 (−31)	−18.5 (−1.3)	−6.5 (20.3)	−1.5 (29.3)	2 (36)	−1.5 (29.3)	−8 (18)	−27 (−17)	−34.5 (−30.1)	−41 (−42)	−41 (−42)
Average precipitation mm (inches)	20.1 (0.79)	16.8 (0.66)	34.5 (1.36)	33.6 (1.32)	52.5 (2.07)	78.3 (3.08)	32.0 (1.26)	37.6 (1.48)	40.5 (1.59)	23.3 (0.92)	19.9 (0.78)	17.5 (0.69)	407.3 (16.04)
Source: 1981-2010 Environment Canada

== See also ==
- List of communities in Alberta
