= Writing-on-Stone Provincial Park =

Provincial park in Alberta, Canada

- Áísínaiʼpi / ᖰᓱᖸᑯ (Blackfoot)
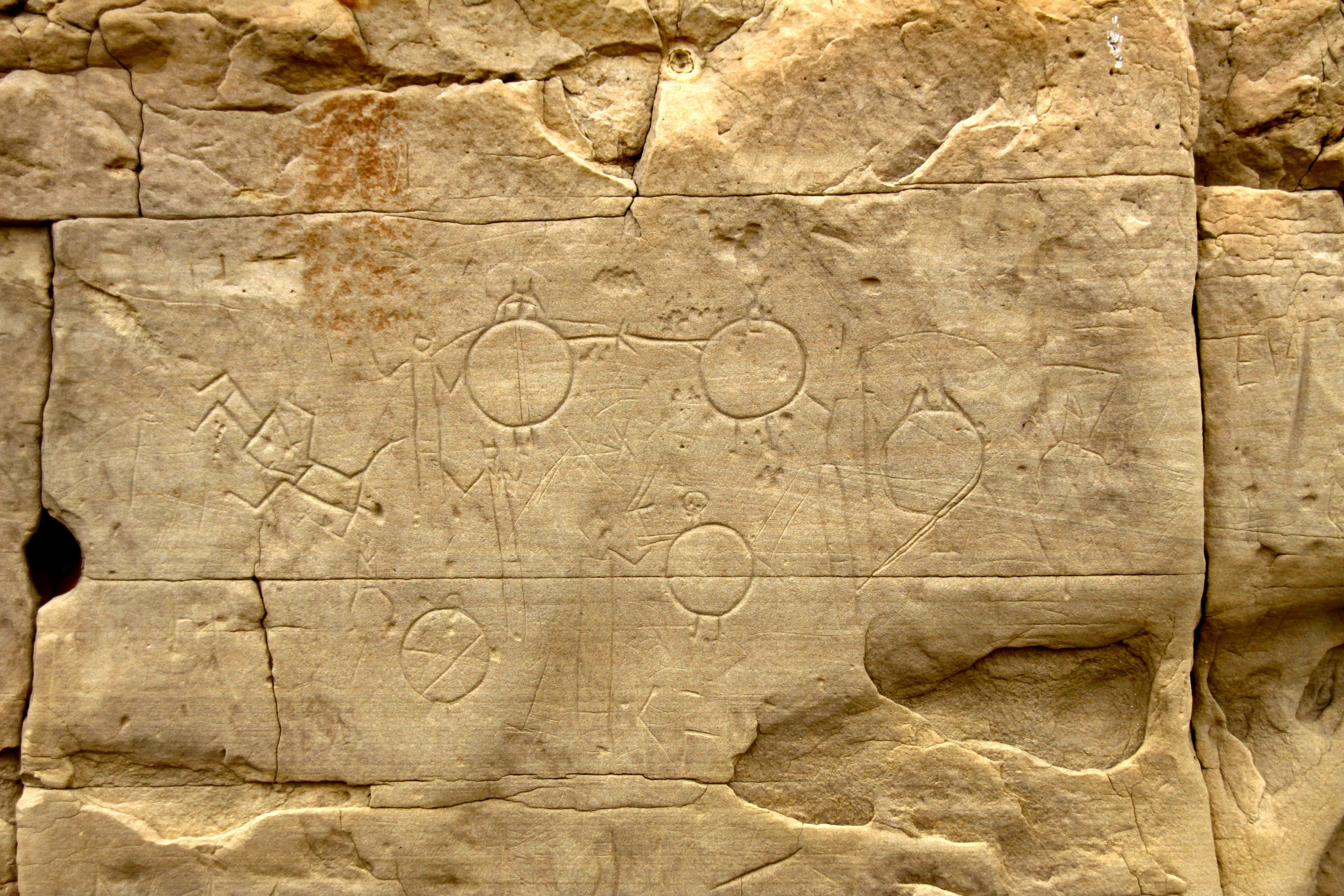
- These petroglyphs were created prior to the arrival of the horse. They show warriors carrying body shields.

- Location within Alberta Location within Canada
- 49°4′55″N 111°37′1″W
- Location: County of Warner No. 5, Alberta, Canada

History
- Founded: January 8, 1957

Site notes
- Area: 1,106 ha (2,730 acres)
- Governing body: Alberta Environment and Parks

UNESCO World Heritage Site
- Official name: Writing-on-Stone / Áísínai’pi
- Criteria: Cultural: (iii)
- Designated: 2019 (43rd session)
- Reference no.: 1597
- Region: North America

National Historic Site of Canada
- Official name: Áísínaiʼpi National Historic Site of Canada
- Designated: March 2005

Alberta Historic Resources Act
- Official name: Writing-on-Stone, Glyphs
- Type: Provincial historic resource
- Designated: 1981
- Reference no.: 4665-0060

IUCN Category III (Natural Monument)
- Designated: 1977

Writing-on-Stone Provincial Park is located about 100 kilometres (60 mi) southeast of Lethbridge, Alberta, Canada, or 44 kilometres (30 mi) east of the community of Milk River, and straddles the Milk River itself. It is one of the largest areas of protected prairie in the Alberta park system, and serves as both a nature preserve and protection for many First Nations (indigenous) rock carvings and paintings. The park is sacred to the Blackfoot and other Indigenous peoples.

On July 6, 2019, Writing-on-Stone (also known as Áísínai’pi) was inscribed as a UNESCO World Heritage Site. Its UNESCO application was filed under the name Áísínaiʼpi / ᖰᓱᖸᑯ, a Blackfoot language word meaning 'it is pictured' (or 'written'). The provincial park is synonymous with the Áísínaiʼpi National Historic Site.

== Resources ==
The park holds one of the largest concentrations of rock art on the North American Great Plains, with more than 50 petroglyph sites and thousands of individual works. The park also showcases a North-West Mounted Police (NWMP) outpost reconstructed on its original site. The original outpost was burned down by persons unknown after it was closed in 1918.

The park features a visitor centre, campgrounds, picnic areas, group-use areas, and hiking trails, as well as canoeing and kayaking on the Milk River.

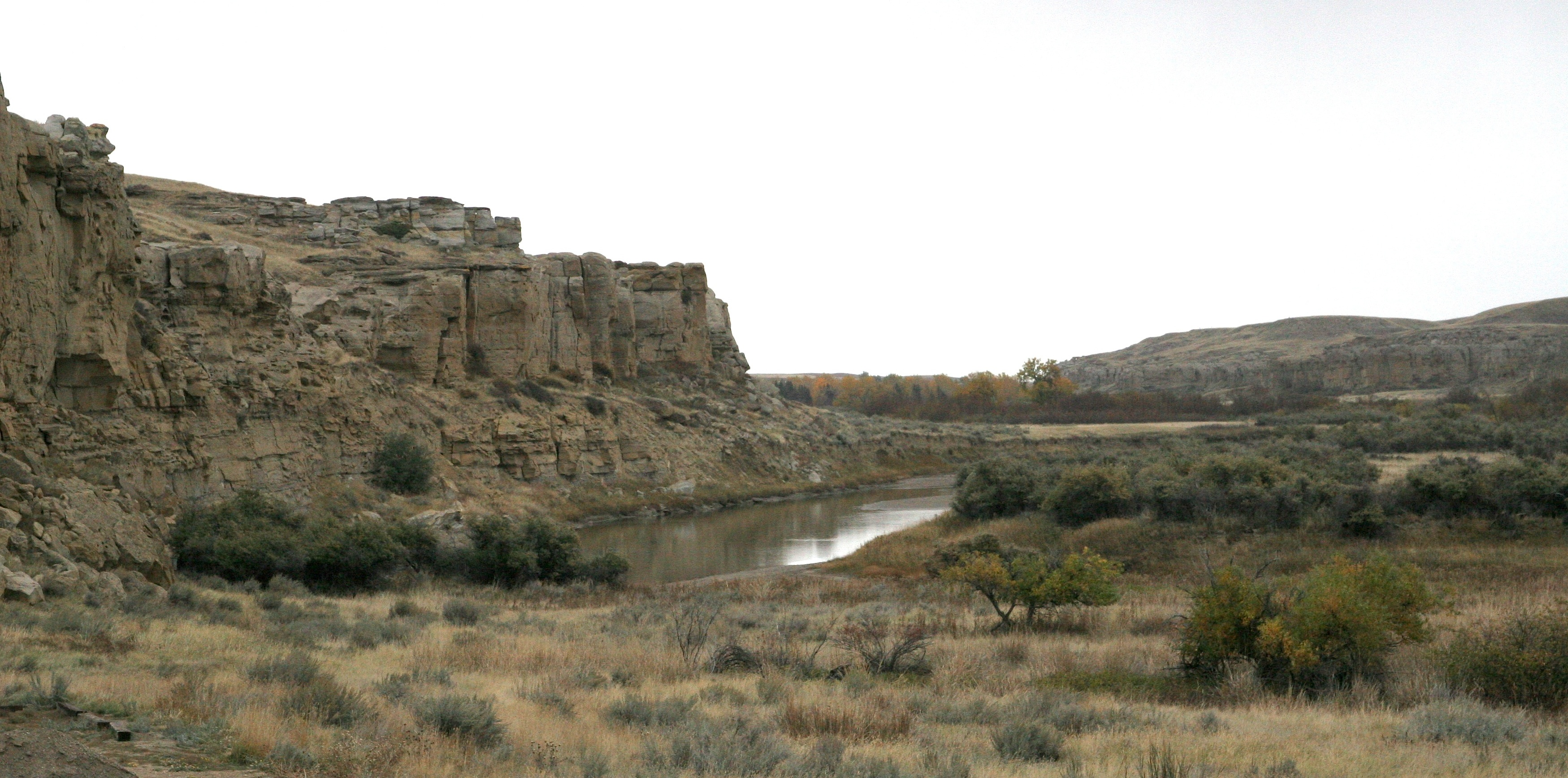
Valley of petroglyphs in Writing-on-Stone Park

== Flora and fauna ==
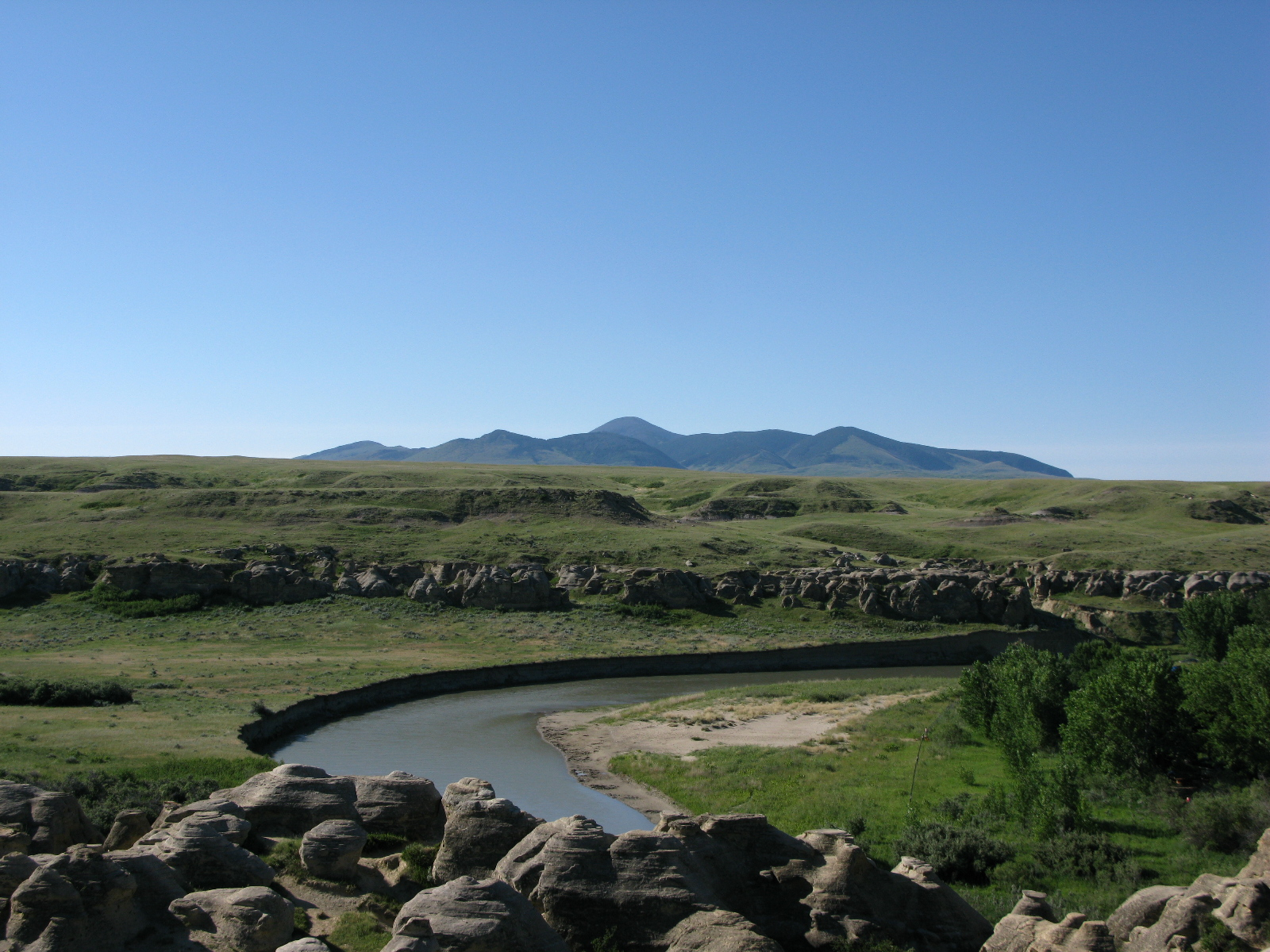
The park is in the Milk River Valley. To the south are the volcanic Sweet Grass Hills of Montana.

The park covers 1,106 ha (2,730 acres) of coulee and prairie habitat, and supports a wide variety of plants and animals.

Bird species include prairie falcons, great horned owls, short-eared owls, American kestrels, and cliff swallows, as well as introduced ring-necked pheasants and grey partridges.

The prairie surrounding the park is good habitat for pronghorn antelopes. Other animals found in the park area include mule deer, northern pocket gophers, skunks, raccoons, yellow-bellied marmots, and bobcats. Tiger salamanders, boreal chorus frogs, leopard frogs, and plains spadefoot toads represent the amphibians. Reptiles include garter snakes, bull snakes, and prairie rattlesnakes.

The coulee environment is optimal for balsam poplars and narrow leaf cottonwoods. There are also peachleaf willows and plains cottonwoods in the park. Shrubs include chokecherry, juniper, saskatoon, sandbar willow, and two species of wild rose, Rosa acicularis and R. woodsii. Some of the northernmost species of cactus, including Opuntia (prickly pear) and Pediocactus (pincushion), are found in the park as well.

== Geologic setting ==
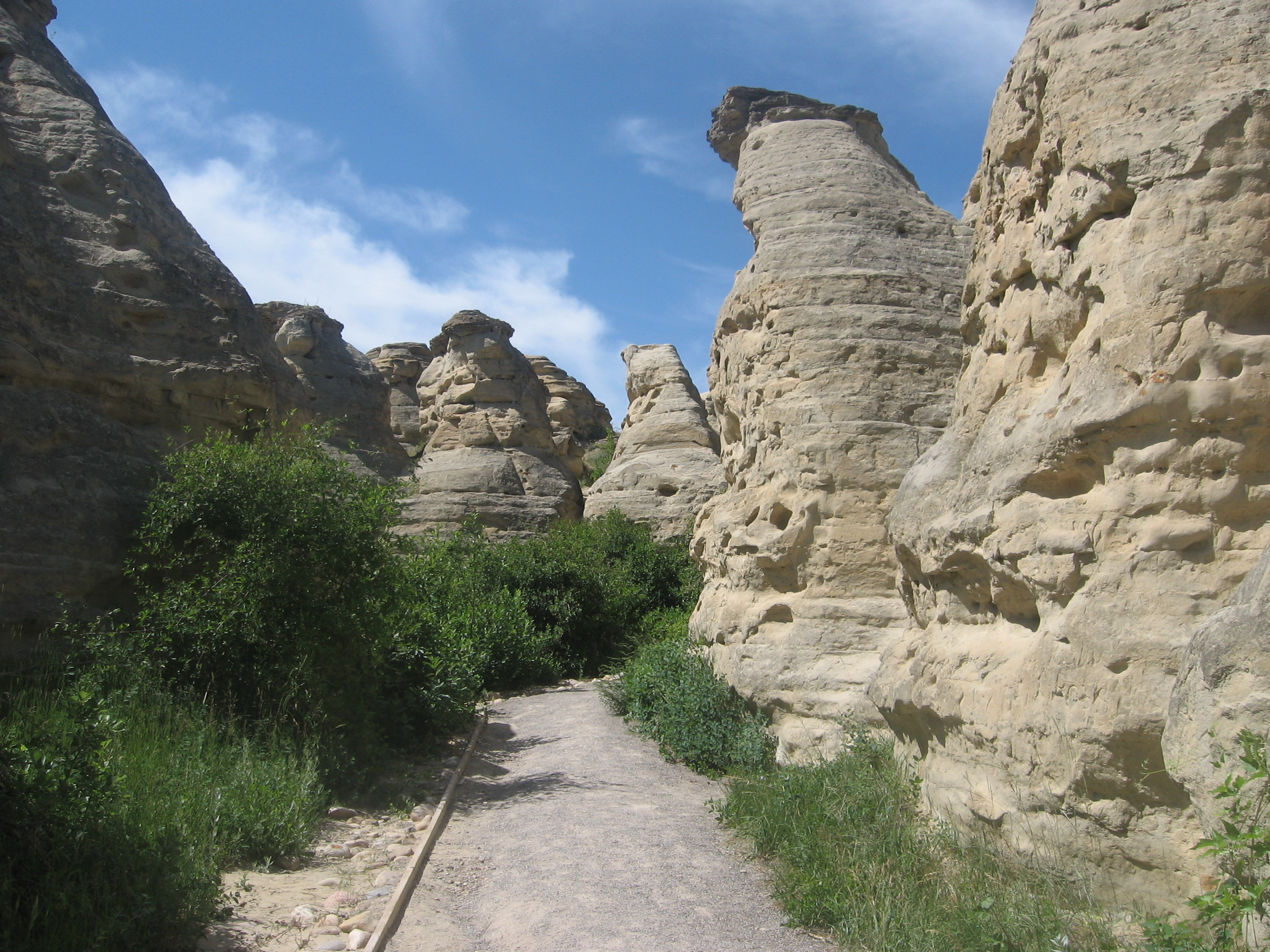
A path winds through hoodoos in the park

The sandstone outcrops in the park belong to the Milk River Formation, which was deposited along the edge of a large inland sea about 84 million years ago during the Late Cretaceous epoch. Meltwater from the retreating glaciers at the end of the last Ice Age carved the present Milk River valley, and water, ice and wind eroded the sandstone to produce the hoodoos and cliffs that are part of the park today.

== Petroglyphs ==
Common scenes depicted in the petroglyphs included coups, or war honours. Coups such as horse raids were feats of bravery that gave young Blackfoot men status and prestige. Horse ownership was a sign of status and wealth. Other depictions in the petroglyphs are of battles that took place between tribes. Spirit Beings were also depicted in the petroglyphs.

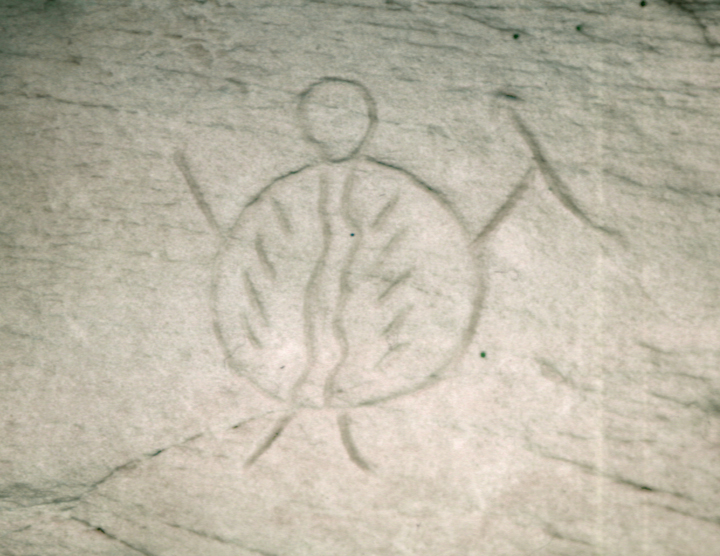
Petroglyph of a human

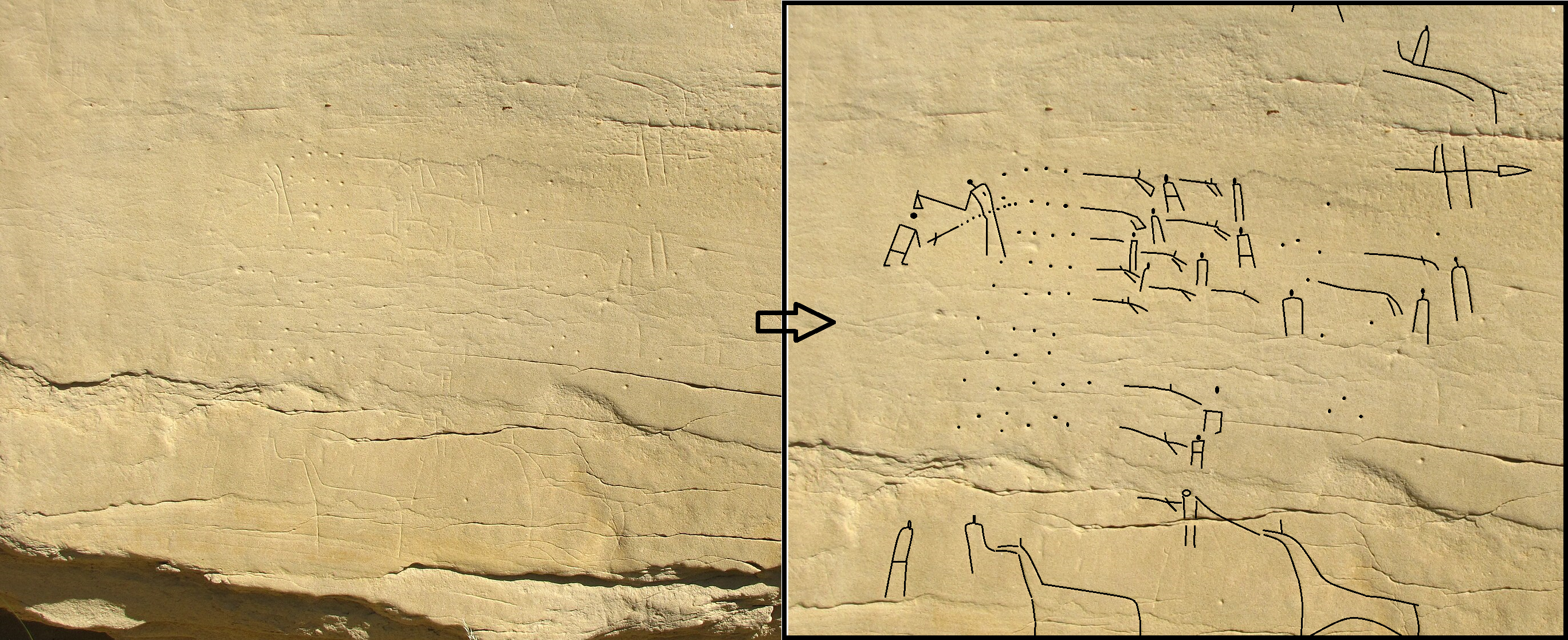
Battle scene petroglyph

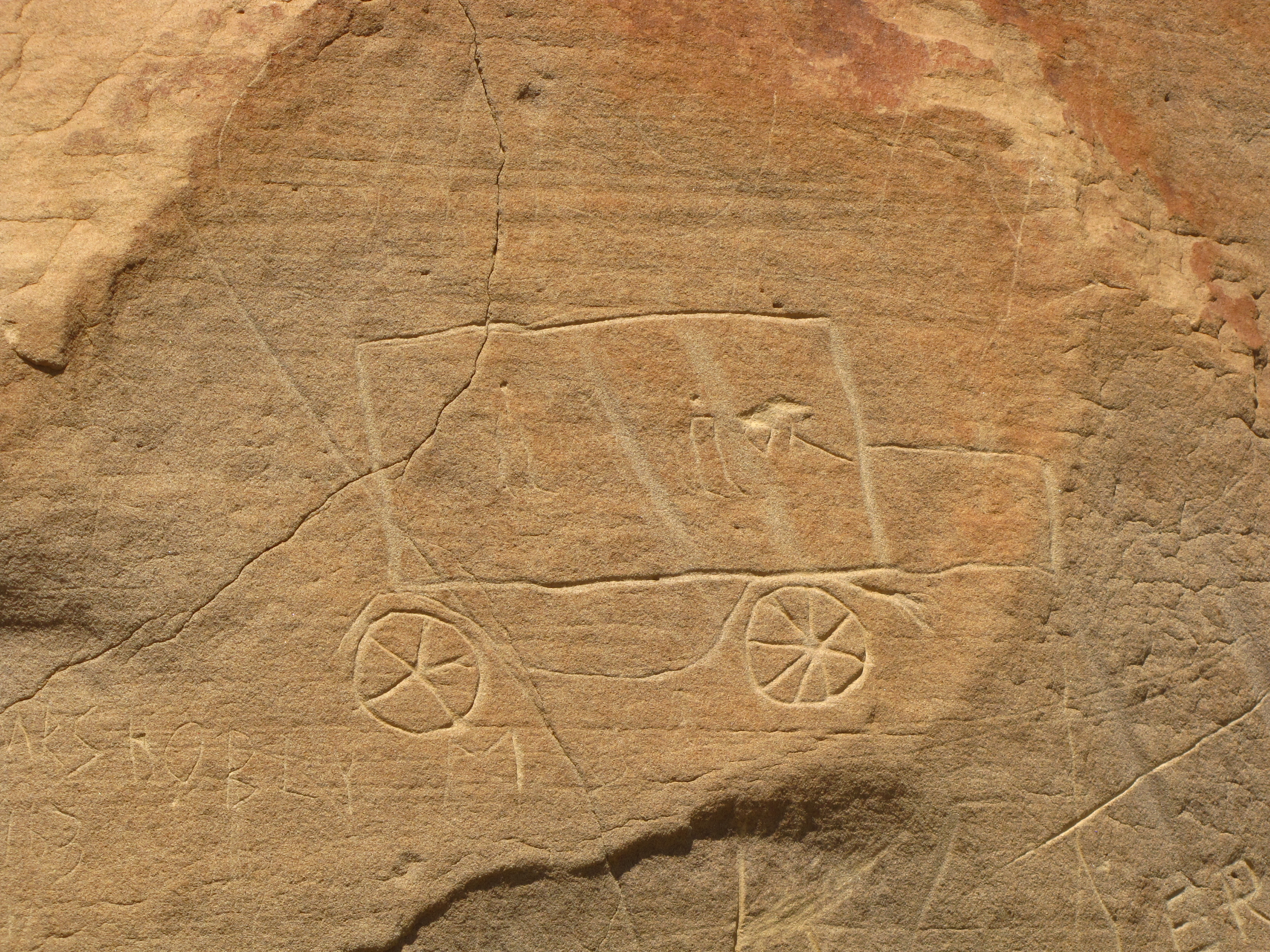
Modern petroglyph of a car

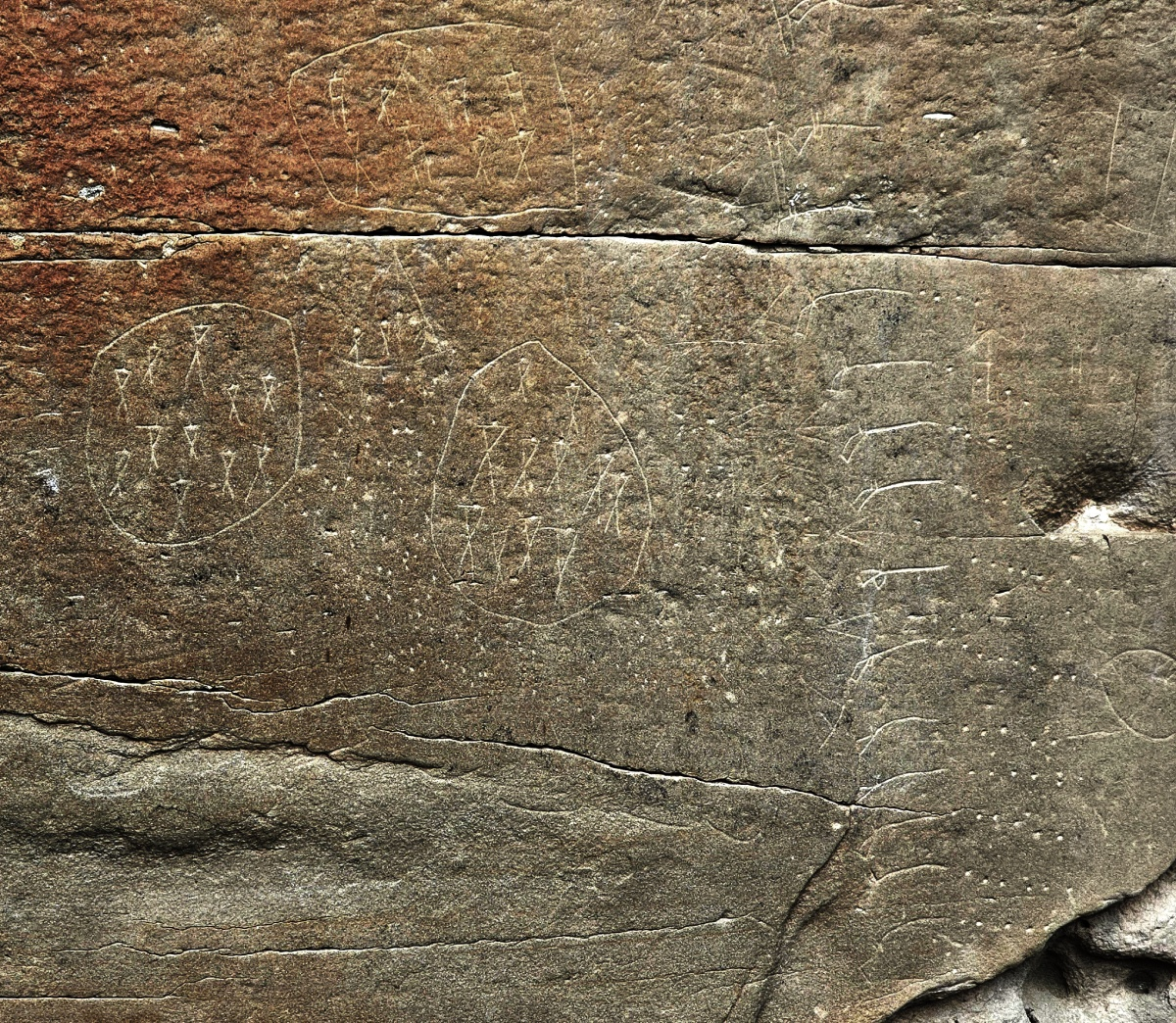
A battle between First Nations: Encampments on the left are defending themselves by shooting guns at attackers.

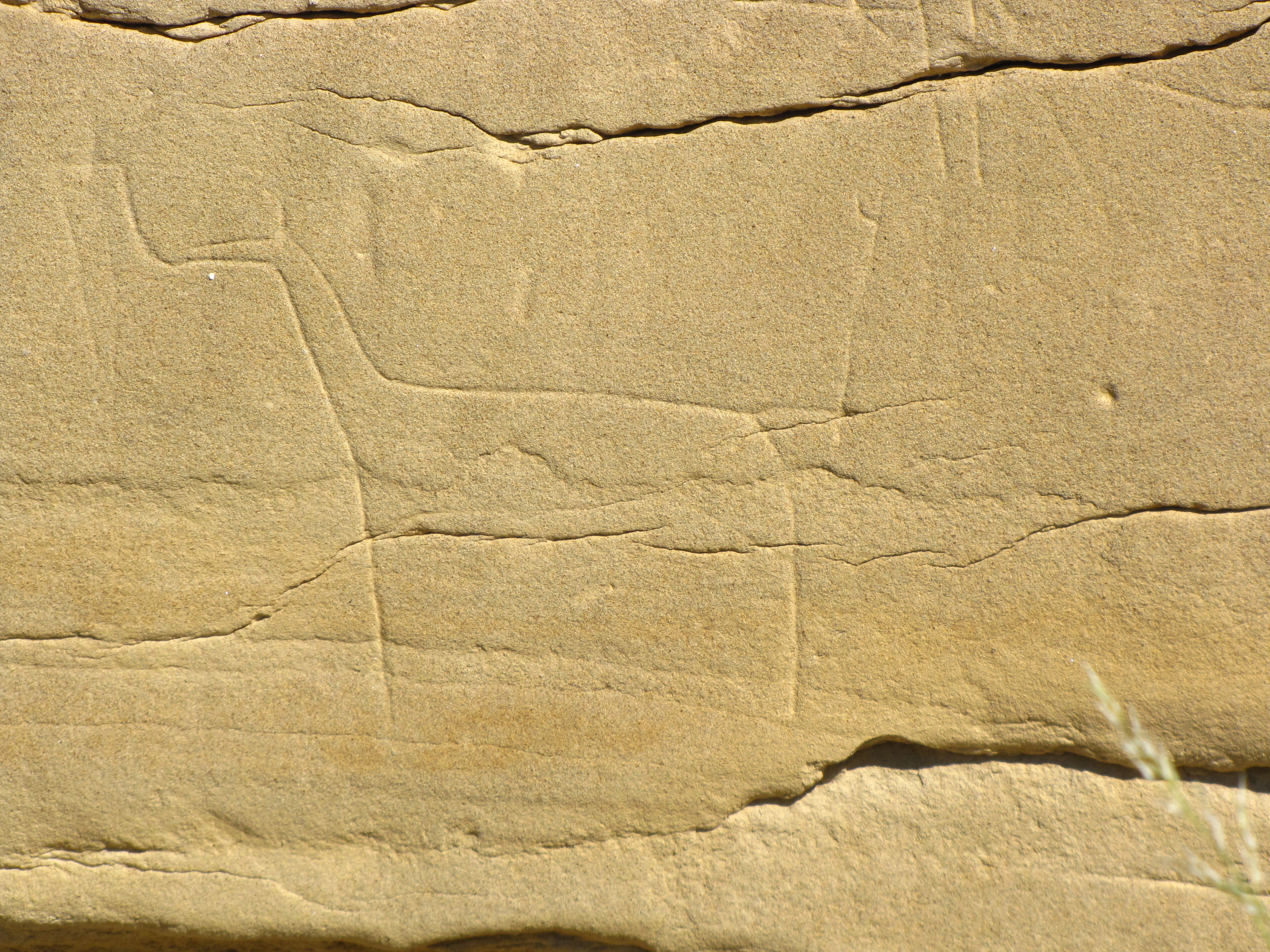
Horse petroglyph

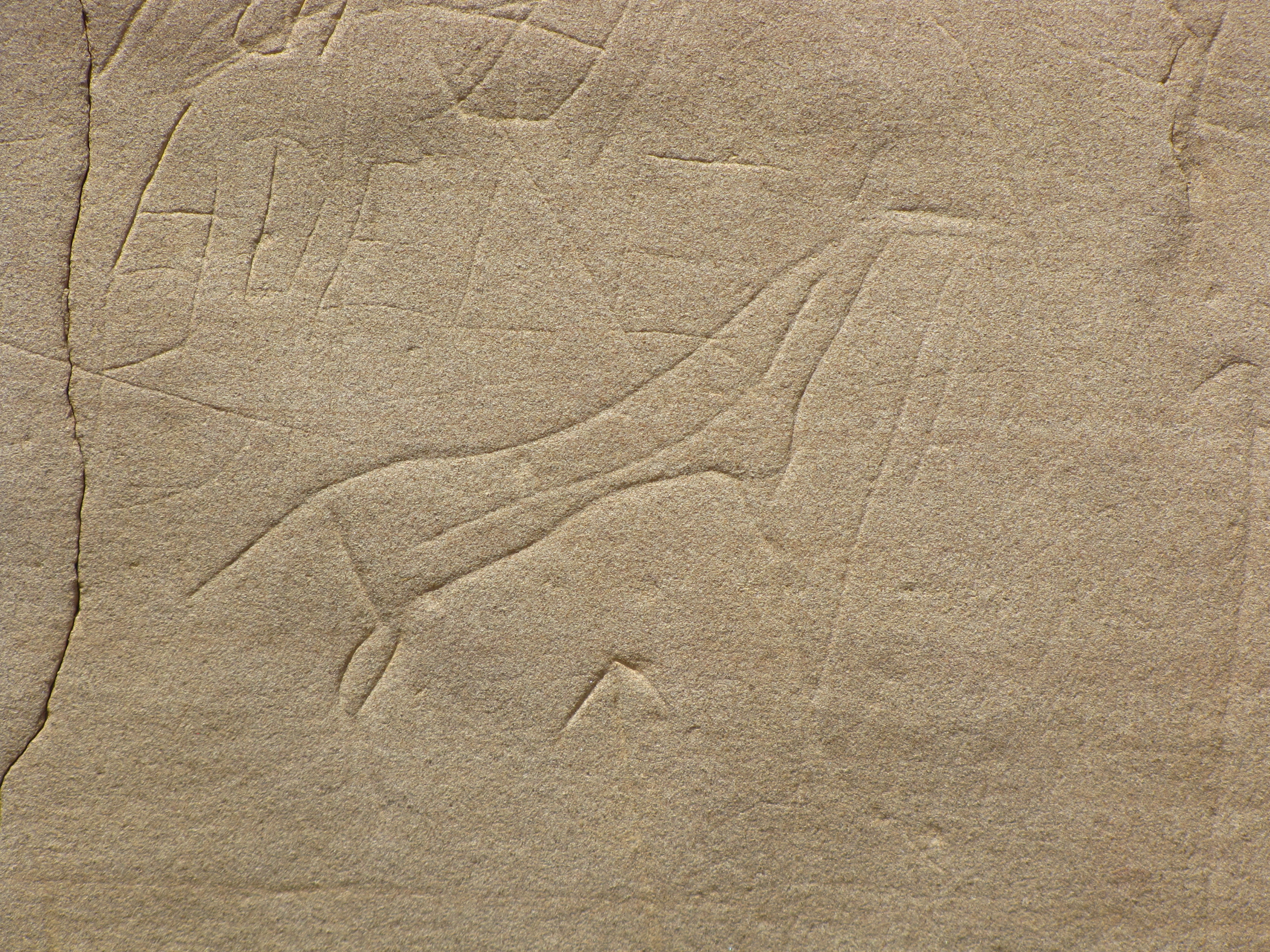
Horse petroglyph

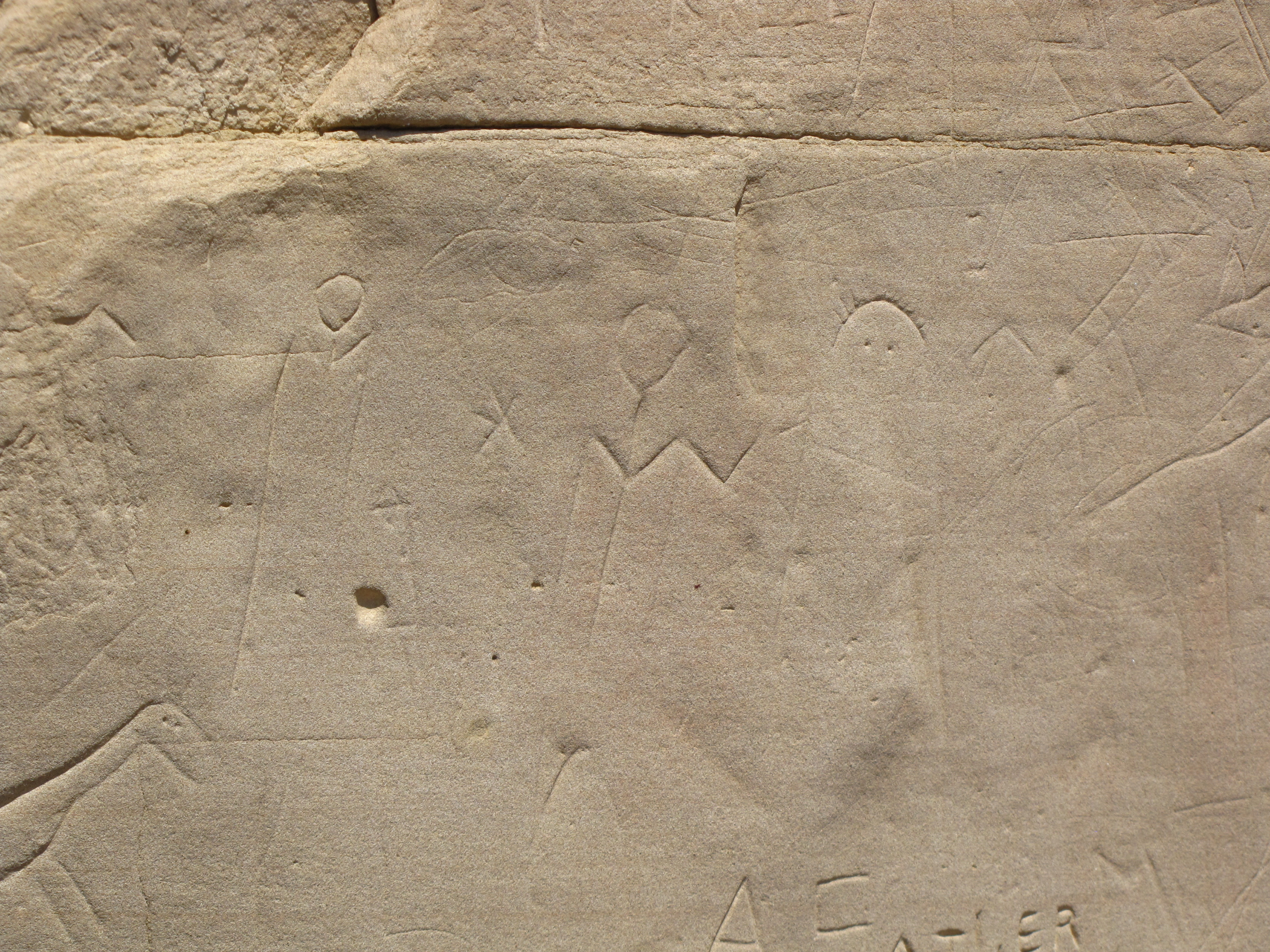
Human figures

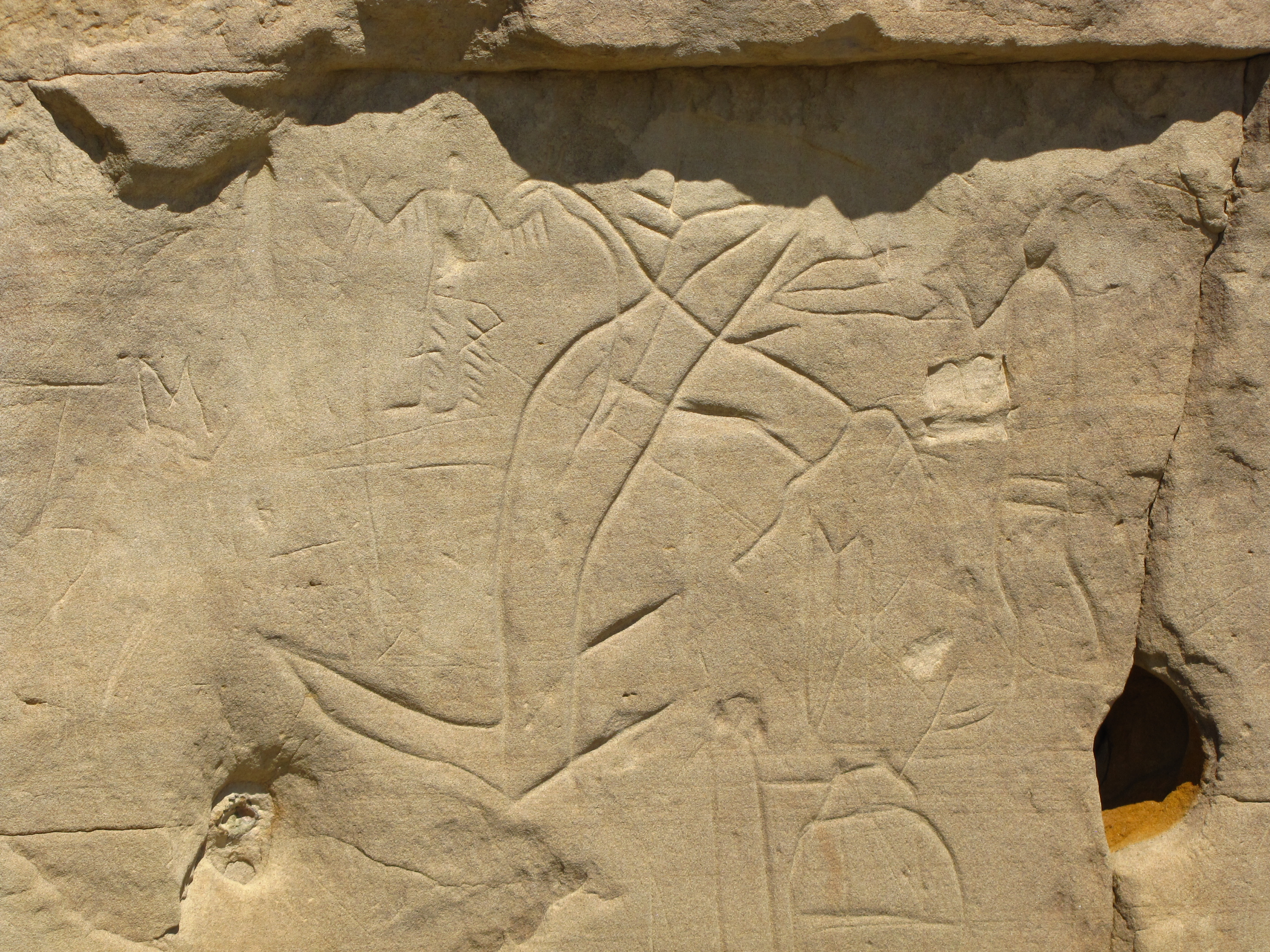
Man and horse

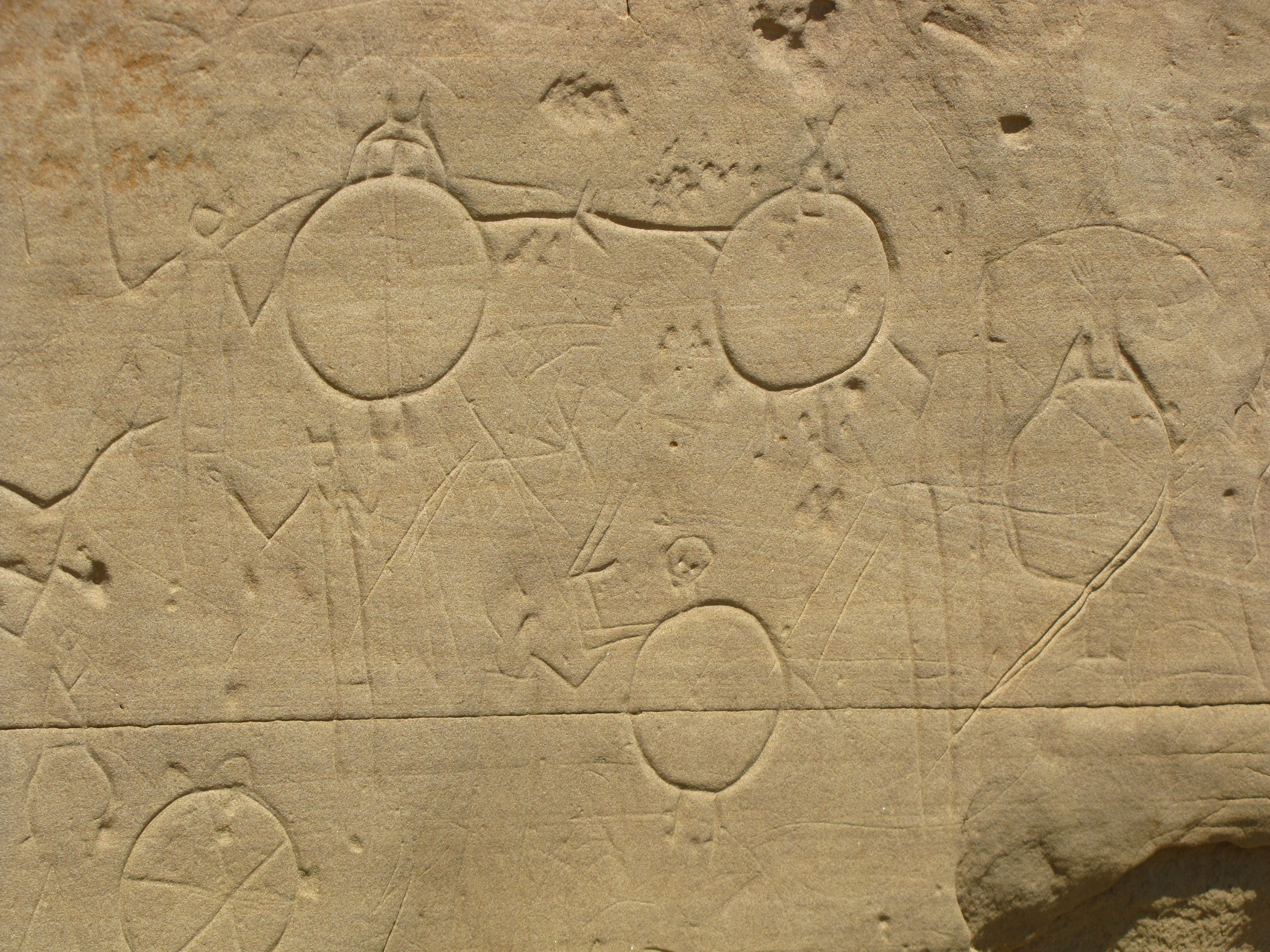
Men with shields

== History ==
There is evidence that the Milk River Valley was inhabited by First Nations people as early as 9,000 years ago. First Nations tribes such as the Blackfoot probably created many of the rock carvings (petroglyphs) and paintings (pictographs). Other First Nations groups such as the Shoshone also travelled through the valley and may have also created some of the art.

The cliffs and hoodoos held spiritual significance for the Blackfoot, who regarded them as the homes of powerful spirits. The shelter of the coulees and the abundance of game and berries made the area that is now the park an excellent location for these nomadic people to stop on their seasonal migrations. While the greatest use of the area was made by those in transit, there is some evidence, including tipi rings and a medicine wheel, that there was some longer-term residence here.

Beginning around the year 1730, large numbers of horses, metal goods, and guns began to appear on the western plains. This signified not only a change in the First Nations lifestyle, but a change in the content of the rock art. Pictures of hunters on horseback, and warriors without body shields began to emerge during this time period.

In 1887 a North-West Mounted Police (the precursor to the Royal Canadian Mounted Police) camp was set up at Writing-on-Stone to attempt to curtail cross-border whisky smuggling, which was devastating the native population, and to put a stop to First Nations horse-raiding parties. But neither problem ever became serious at this outpost, and the NWMP spent most of their time fighting summer grass fires, herding stray American cattle back across the border, and riding hundreds of uneventful kilometres on border patrol. In the period immediately preceding World War I, settlers began to arrive in the area, which helped to alleviate some of the boredom and isolation the NWMP officers faced. In 1918, the outpost was closed, as Canadian authorities felt little possibility of criminal activity along the border, and shortly thereafter, the outpost fell victim to arson by persons unknown.

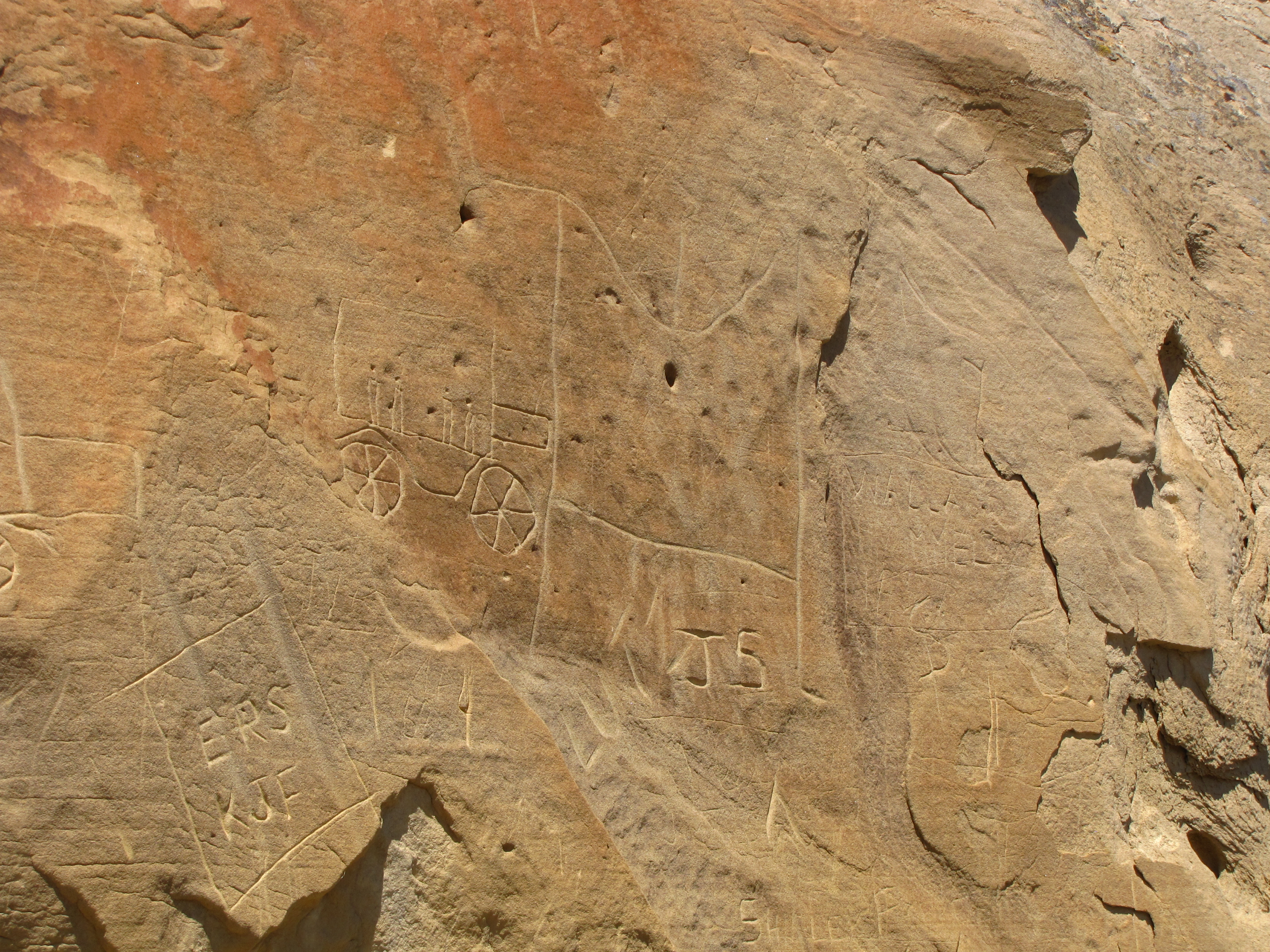
Modern petroglyph of a car from Writing-on-Stone

The park was created in 1957 and was designated an archaeological preserve in 1977. As part of the NWMP centennial celebrations, the outpost was reconstructed between 1973 and 1975, and is now one of the attractions in the park. Archaeologists from the Alberta Provincial Parks Department surveyed and catalogued numerous petroglyph and pictograph sites within the park in 1973. In 1981, a portion of the park was named a Provincial Historic Resource to protect this rock art from increasing impact from vandalism and graffiti. The most sensitive areas are now set aside in areas designated for guided tours only.

In 2004 Parks Canada added the park to Canada's tentative list of possible world heritage sites. The application indicated that the Blackfoot people would also like the Sweet Grass Hills of Montana included as part of the world heritage site. In March 2005, the park was designated a National Historic Site. On June 20, 2007, the park's new visitor centre, with views of the valley from the north rim, was officially opened.

== See also ==
- List of Alberta provincial parks
- List of Canadian provincial parks
- List of National Parks of Canada
