= Milk River, Alberta =

Town in Alberta, Canada

Milk River
- Town
- Town of Milk River
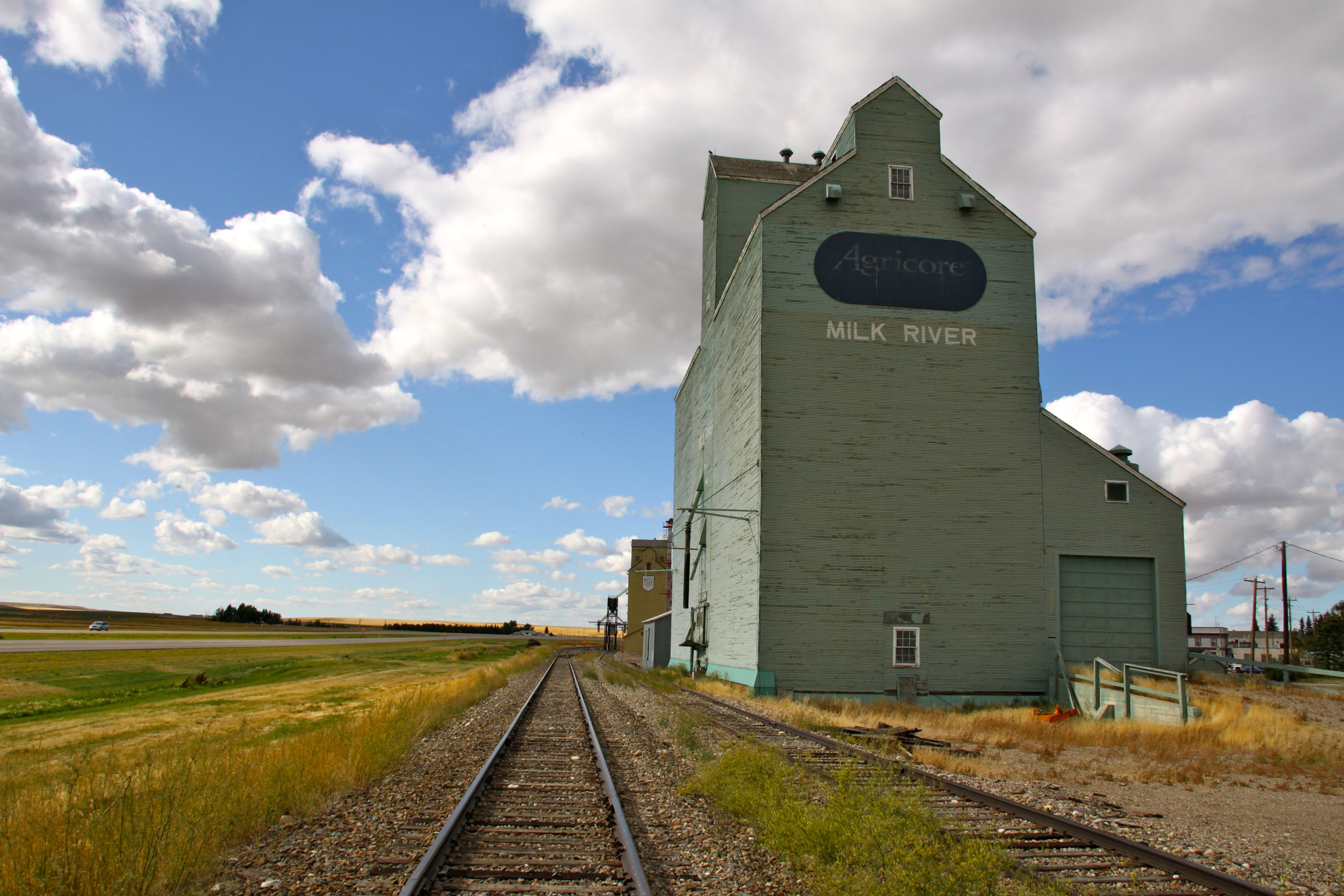
- Grain elevators in Milk River prior to demolition
- Motto: Under Eight Flags
- Location within Alberta
- Coordinates: 49°9′0″N 112°5′12″W
- Country: Canada
- Province: Alberta
- Region: Southern Alberta
- Census division: 2
- Municipal district: County of Warner No. 5
- Incorporated
  - Village: July 11, 1916
  - Town: February 7, 1956

Government
  - Mayor: Larry Liebelt
  - Governing body: Milk River Town Council

Area (2021)
  - Land: 2.42 km^{2} (0.93 sq mi)
- Elevation: 1,059 m (3,474 ft)

Population (2021)
  - Total: 824
  - Density: 340.9/km^{2} (883/sq mi)
- Time zone: UTC−06:00 (Alberta Time)
- Postal code span: T0K 1M0
- Highways: Highway 4 Highway 501
- Waterway: Milk River
- GNBC Code: IAJZQ
- Website: www.milkriver.ca

Milk River is a town in Alberta, Canada that is named after the Milk River which flows immediately to its south. This location results in Milk River being one of the few Canadian communities within the Mississippi River drainage system. It is 70 kilometres (43 mi) south of Lethbridge, and 16 kilometres (9.9 mi) from the Canada–United States border. It is primarily a service centre for the many farms and cattle ranches which surround it.

== History ==
The Milk River area was first settled around the beginning of the 20th century. Milk River was incorporated as a village on July 31, 1916, and then a town on March 15, 1956.

The town's motto, "Under Eight Flags", refers to the area having been under the flags of seven governments as well as the Hudson's Bay Company. Including the Hudson's Bay Company's flag (1818–1869), the eight flags are France (1682–1760), the Spanish Empire (1769–1801), the French Republic (1801–1803), the United States (1803–1818), the British Empire (1869–1945), the Canadian Red Ensign (1945–1965), and the current Canadian Maple Leaf (1965–present).

== Geography ==
=== Climate ===
The nearest weather station is in Masinasin, Alberta, which is approximately 36 km (22 mi) away.

Milk River has a humid continental climate (Dfb) and enjoys some of the warmest summers in Alberta, along with milder winters.

Climate data for Masinasin, Alberta
Month	Jan	Feb	Mar	Apr	May	Jun	Jul	Aug	Sep	Oct	Nov	Dec	Year
Record high °C (°F)	17 (63)	24 (75)	23 (73)	31.5 (88.7)	33.5 (92.3)	37 (99)	39 (102)	41 (106)	37 (99)	31 (88)	24 (75)	17.5 (63.5)	41 (106)
Mean daily maximum °C (°F)	−0.5 (31.1)	2.0 (35.6)	6.7 (44.1)	13.8 (56.8)	19.4 (66.9)	23.4 (74.1)	28.3 (82.9)	27.4 (81.3)	20.8 (69.4)	13.9 (57.0)	4.9 (40.8)	−0.8 (30.6)	13.3 (55.9)
Daily mean °C (°F)	−6.2 (20.8)	−4.1 (24.6)	0.4 (32.7)	6.6 (43.9)	11.9 (53.4)	16.0 (60.8)	19.7 (67.5)	18.9 (66.0)	13.2 (55.8)	7.1 (44.8)	−0.9 (30.4)	−6.6 (20.1)	6.3 (43.3)
Mean daily minimum °C (°F)	−12 (10)	−10.2 (13.6)	−5.8 (21.6)	−0.6 (30.9)	4.3 (39.7)	8.6 (47.5)	11.0 (51.8)	10.3 (50.5)	5.6 (42.1)	0.2 (32.4)	−6.6 (20.1)	−12.4 (9.7)	−0.6 (30.9)
Record low °C (°F)	−39 (−38)	−36.5 (−33.7)	−35 (−31)	−18.5 (−1.3)	−6.5 (20.3)	−1.5 (29.3)	2 (36)	−1.5 (29.3)	−8 (18)	−27 (−17)	−34.5 (−30.1)	−41 (−42)	−41 (−42)
Average precipitation mm (inches)	20.1 (0.79)	16.8 (0.66)	34.5 (1.36)	33.6 (1.32)	52.5 (2.07)	78.3 (3.08)	32.0 (1.26)	37.6 (1.48)	40.5 (1.59)	23.3 (0.92)	19.9 (0.78)	17.5 (0.69)	407.3 (16.04)
Source: 1981-2010 Environment Canada

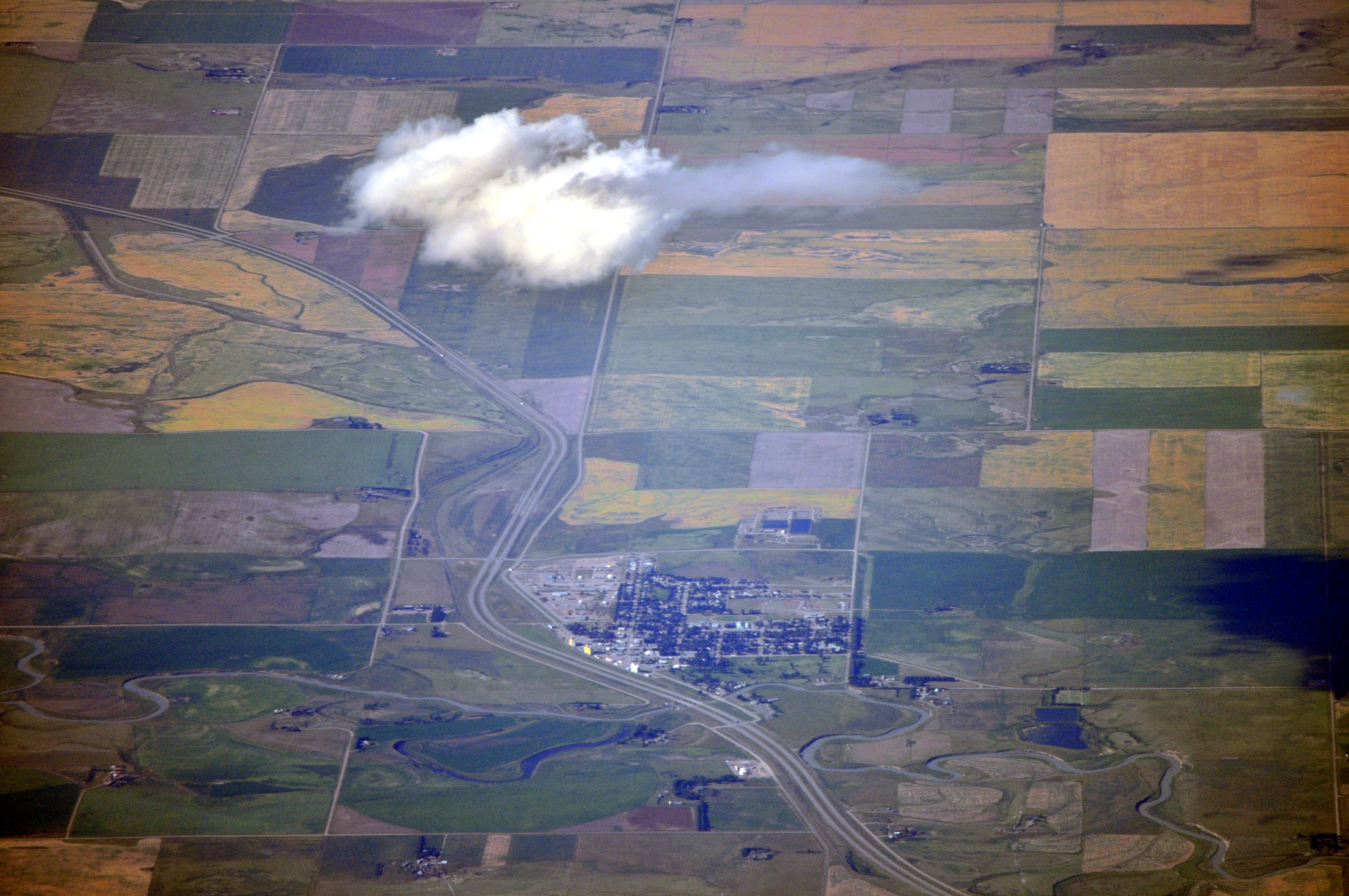
Aerial view of Milk River and Highway 4

== Demographics ==
In the 2021 Census of Population conducted by Statistics Canada, the Town of Milk River had a population of 824 living in 383 of its 436 total private dwellings, a change of −0.4% from its 2016 population of 827. With a land area of 2.42 km^{2} (0.93 sq mi), it had a population density of 340.5/km^{2} (881.9/sq mi) in 2021.

In the 2016 Census of Population conducted by Statistics Canada, the Town of Milk River recorded a population of 827 living in 375 of its 420 total private dwellings, a 2% change from its 2011 population of 811. With a land area of 2.33 km^{2} (0.90 sq mi), it had a population density of 354.9/km^{2} (919.3/sq mi) in 2016.

== Attractions ==
Recreation venues in Milk River include a nine-hole golf course, curling rink, and swimming pool.

Rafting and canoeing the Milk River is possible in the spring months; in summer and fall river flow levels drop such that reliable canoeing and rafting cannot be had. River access can be found at Under 8 Flags Campground within the Town of Milk River, Goldsprings Park to the south of Milk River, and various bridges to the east of Milk River.

Attractions within the surrounding region that are proximate to Milk River include the following.

Devil's Coulee Dinosaur Heritage Museum

The Devil's Coulee Dinosaur Heritage Museum features a Hadrosaur (duck-billed dinosaur) nest and embryo, ancient fossils, dinosaur models.

Writing On Stone Provincial Park

Writing-on-Stone Provincial Park, is one of the largest areas of protected prairie in the Alberta park system, and serves as both a nature preserve and protection for the largest concentration of rock art, created by Plains People. There are over 50 rock art sites, with thousands of figures, as well as numerous archeological sites. The park is located approximately 40 km east of Milk River.

== Government ==
Milk River federal election results
Year	Liberal		Conservative		New Democratic		Green	
2021	6%	23	72%	286	8%	34	1%	5
2019	4%	16	86%	354	5%	20	2%	7

Milk River provincial election results
Year	United Cons.		New Democratic	
2019	77%	458	12%	71
2015	42%	143	17%	59

The town is governed by a town council composed of a mayor and four councillors. Municipal elections are held every four years.

== Infrastructure ==
The town is connected to two highways: Highway 4, which heads south to Interstate 15 and north to Lethbridge, and Highway 501, which heads west to Cardston and east to Saskatchewan. The community has the Milk River Airport and previously had rail service offered through Canadian Pacific Kansas City.

=== Milk River Health Centre ===
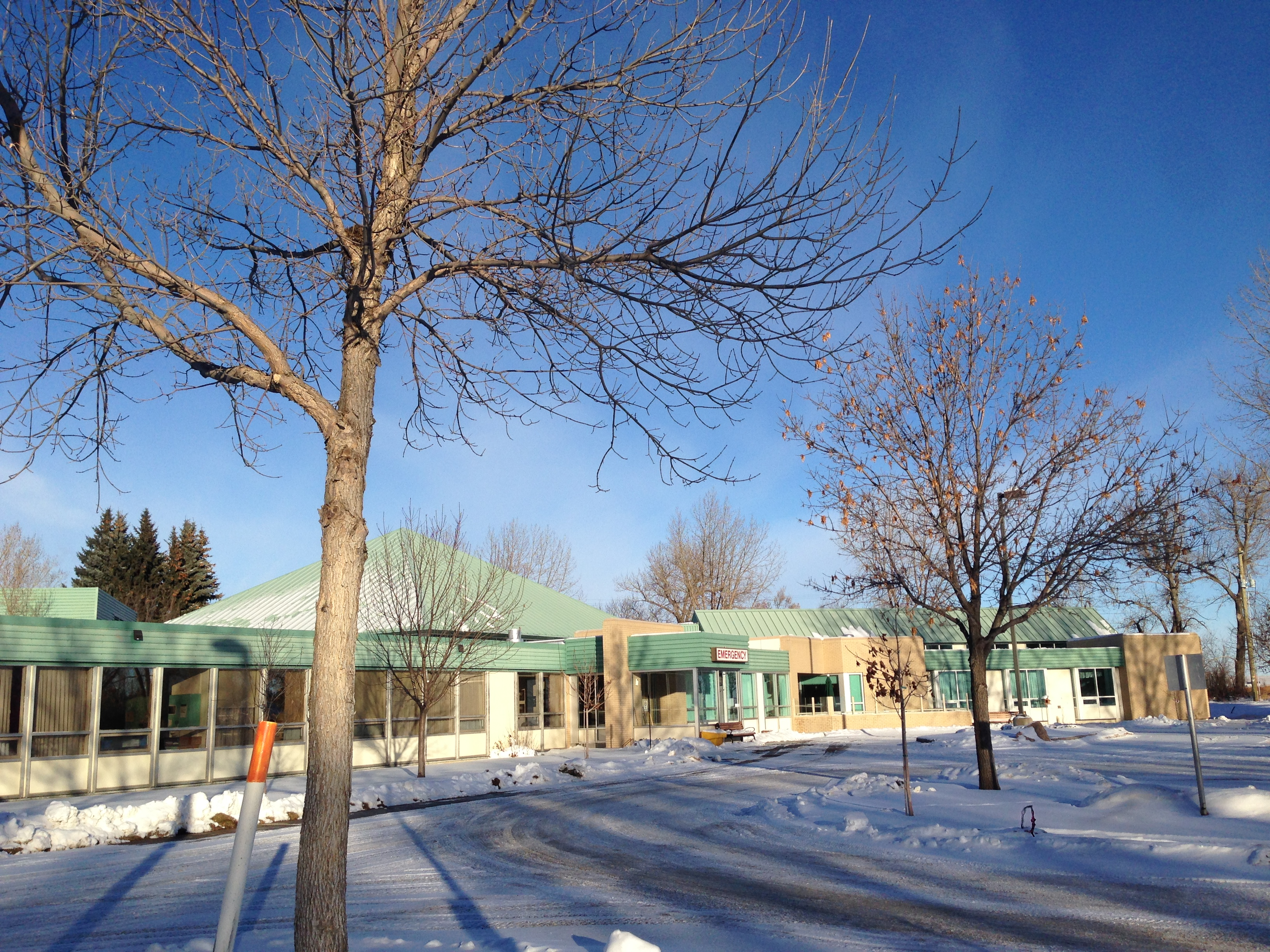
Milk River Health Centre

Health services are provided by the Milk River and District Health Centre. The hospital offers 24/7 emergency department services with on call laboratory and diagnostic imaging services. Between 2005 and 2008, the emergency department averaged 1,351 visits per year. The tertiary referral centre for the hospital is Chinook Regional Hospital in Lethbridge.

== Education ==
Milk River has one school .

== Media ==
The Milk River Review was a weekly newspaper that was published between November 11, 1948 and May 27, 1954. It continued as a weekly throughout its run as The Review from June 17, 1954 to August 21, 1958, and again under the title of County of Warner Review and Advertiser between September 1, 1958 and March 30, 1961. Finally, the weekly newspaper returned to its original name, running as the Milk River Review from June 1, 1961 through to November 16, 1961.

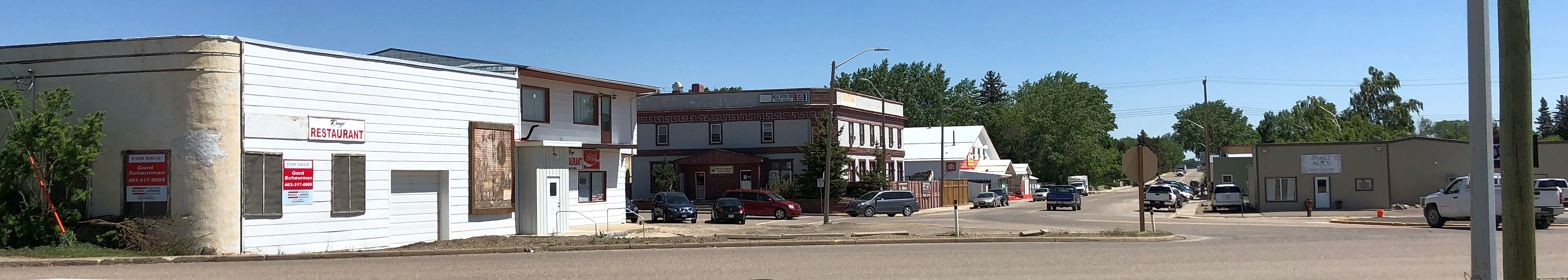
Centre Avenue in Milk River

== See also ==
- List of communities in Alberta
- List of towns in Alberta
