= List of ghost towns in Alberta =

The province of Alberta has several ghost towns that have been completely or partially abandoned. Many of Alberta's ghost towns exist as a result of a number of failed coal mining operations in the area during the early 20th century.

Ghost towns are communities that once had a considerable population, that have since dwindled in numbers causing some or all its business to close, either due to the rerouting of a highway, train tracks being pulled, or exhaustion of some natural resource.

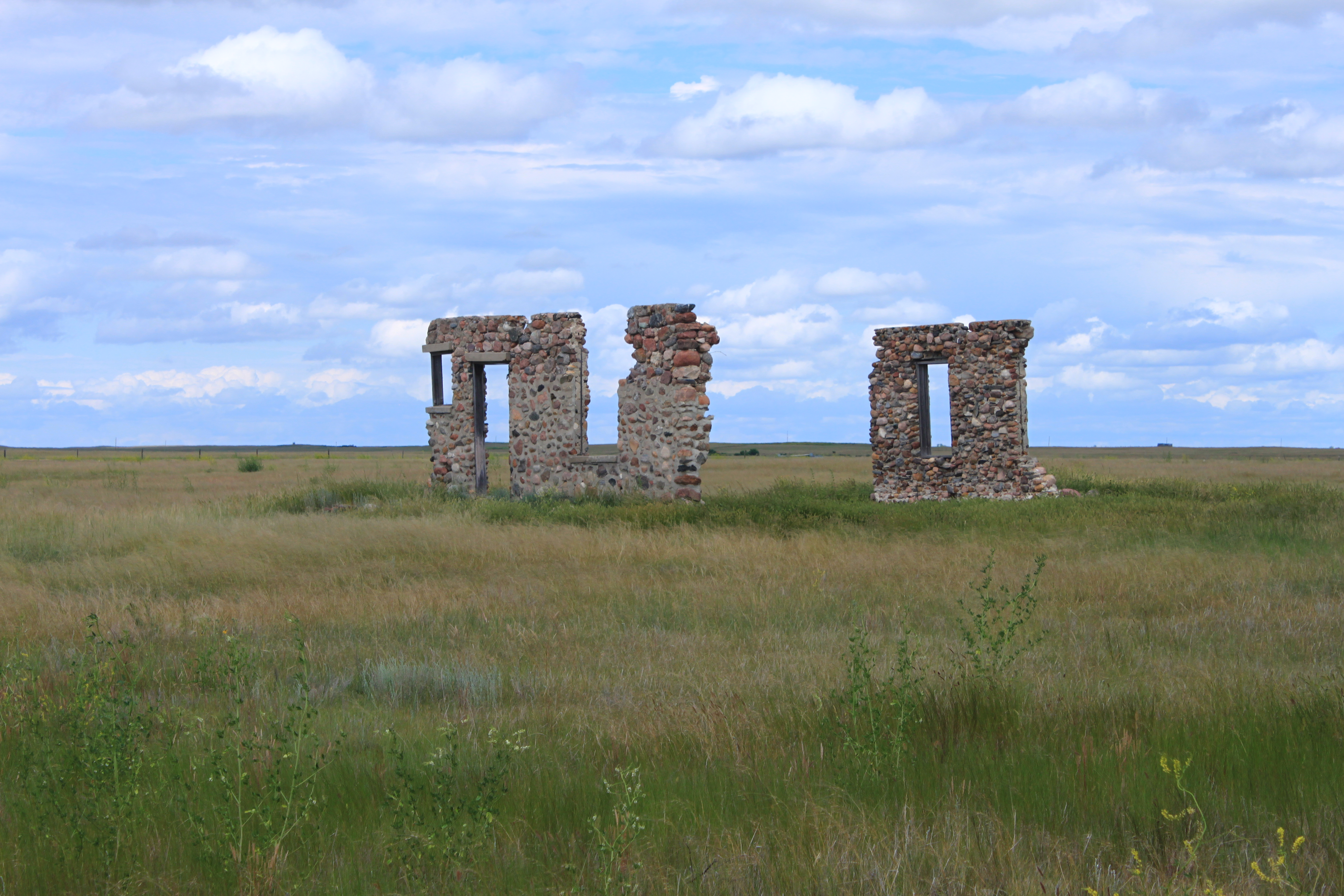
Remains of Flowerdale

Hotel in Luscar in the 1950s

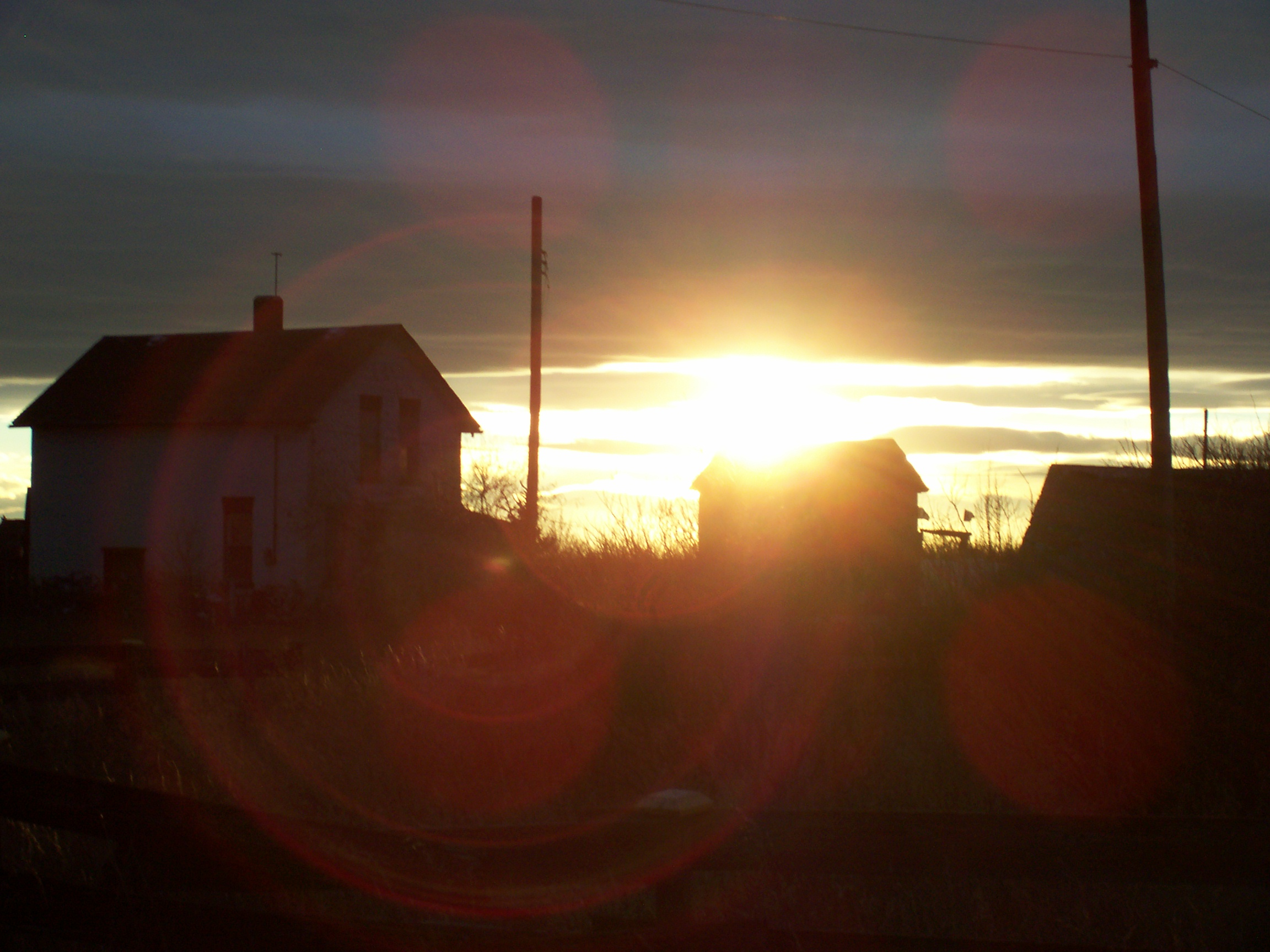
Sun setting on Maybutt

The road into Mountain Park

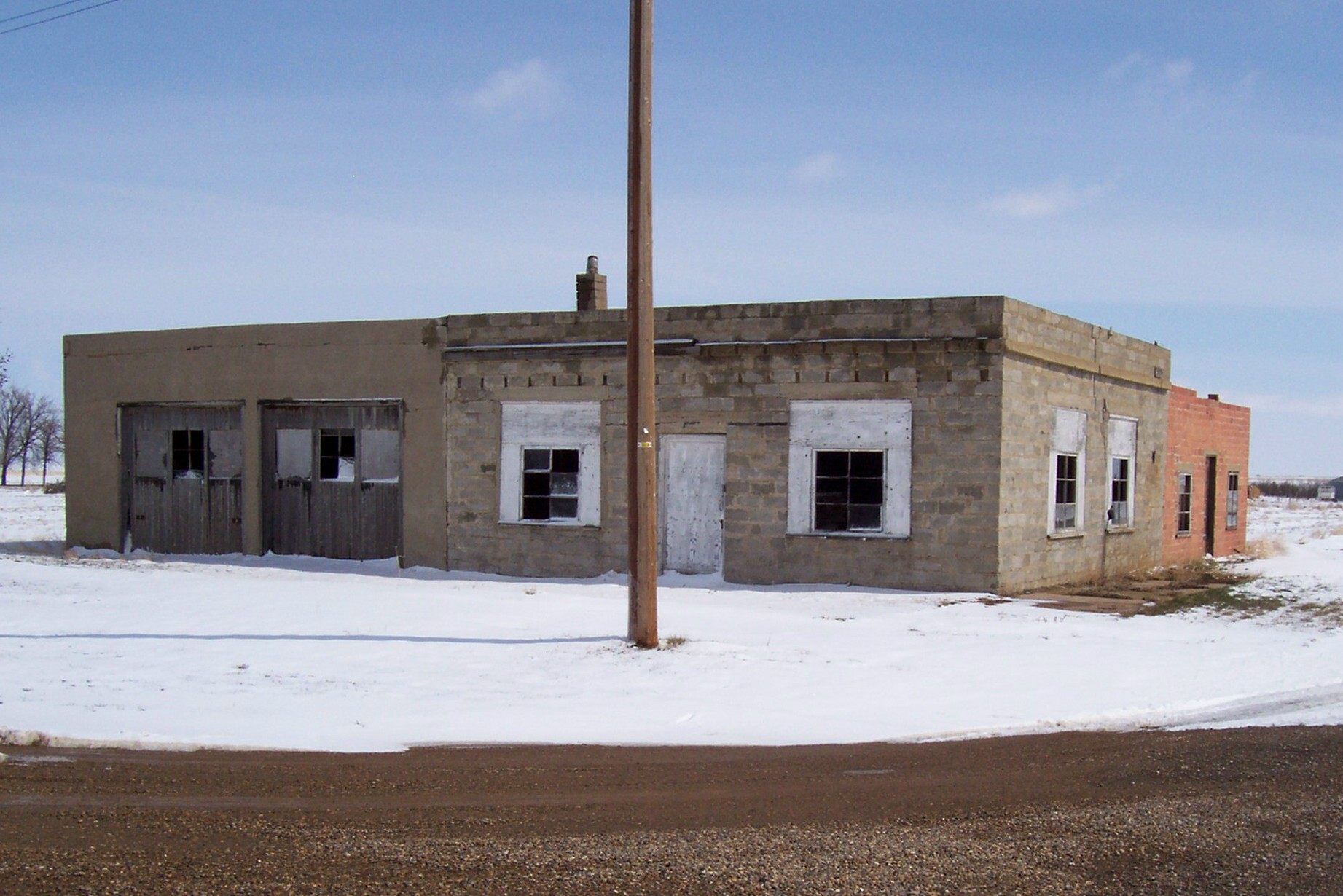
Vacant store in Nemiscam

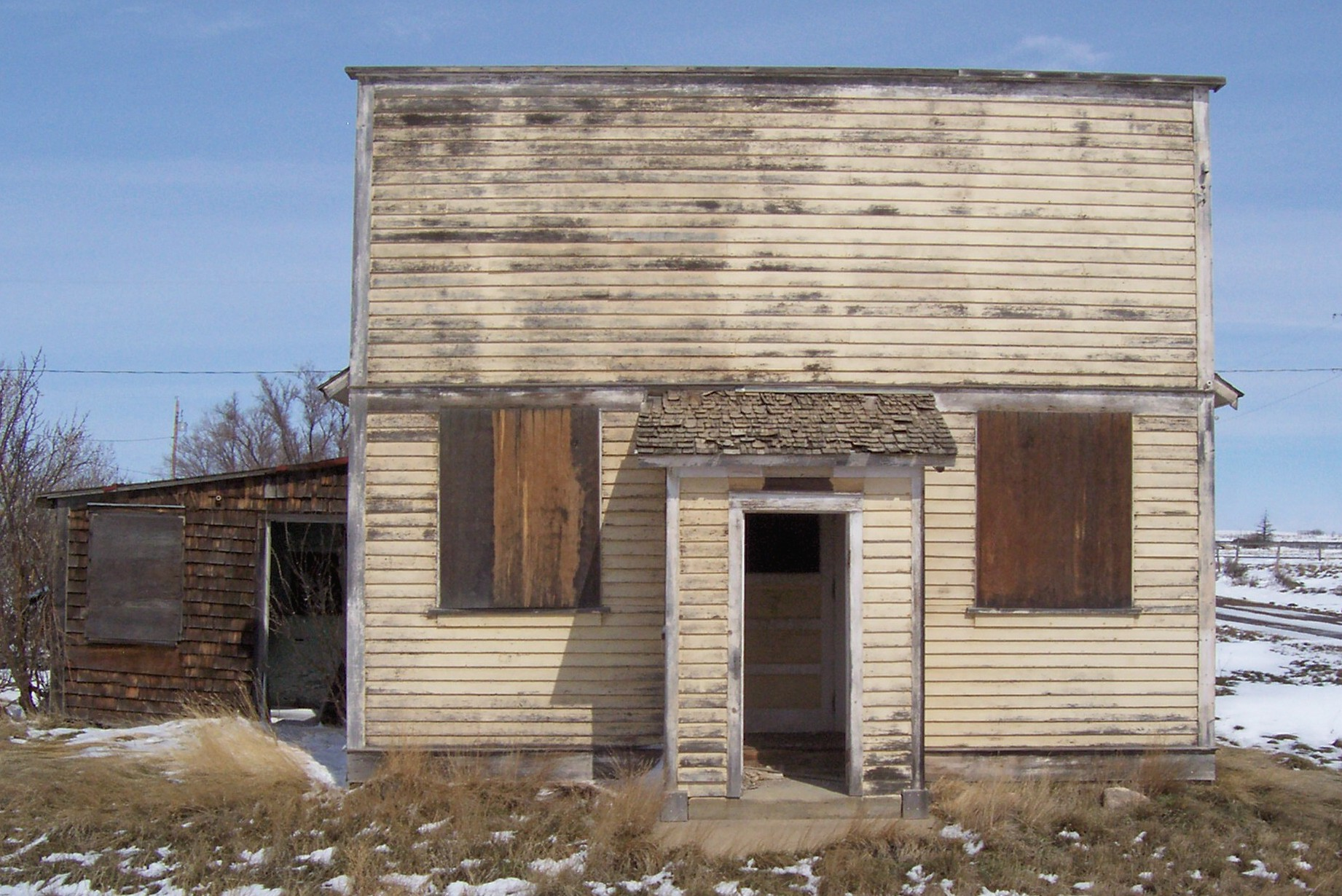
Vacant store in Orion

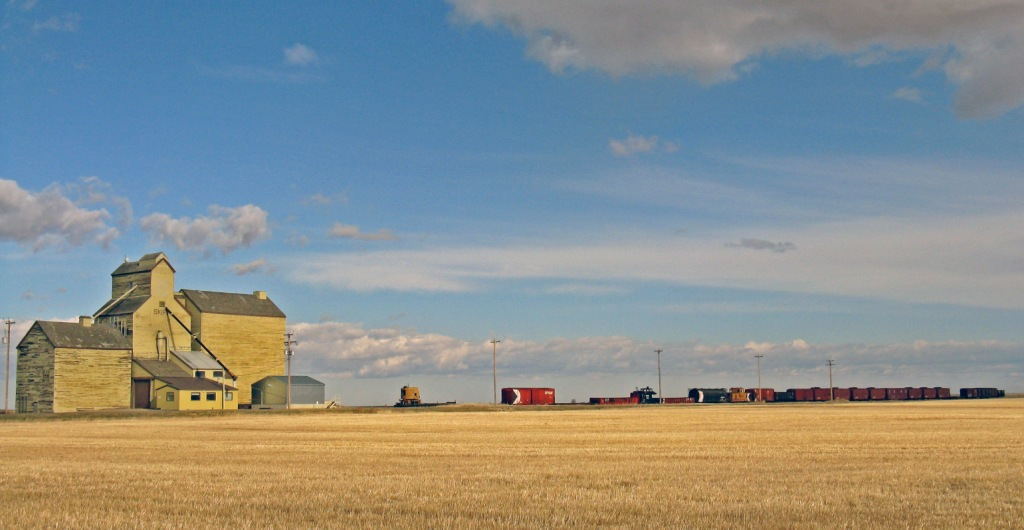
Grain elevator in Skiff

== List of ghost towns ==
List of ghost towns in Alberta
| Ghost town | Municipality | About | Peak population (year) | Latest population (year) |
|---|---|---|---|---|
| Alderson | Cypress County | | 161 (1911) | |
| Alexo | Clearwater County | Former coal mining community | 113 (1951) | |
| Allerston | County of Warner No. 5 | | | |
| Allingham | Kneehill County | | | |
| Ardley | Red Deer County | | | 17 (1991) |
| Altorado | County of Forty Mile No. 8 | | | |
| Amber Valley | Athabasca County | | | |
| Ansell | Yellowhead County | | 272 (1951) | |
| Anthracite | Improvement District No. 9 (Banff National Park) | | 25 (1911) | |
| Ardenode | Wheatland County | | | 0 (2016) |
| Bankhead | Improvement District No. 9 (Banff National Park) | Former coal mining community | 694 (1911) | |
| Bardo | Beaver County | | | |
| Battle Bend | Flagstaff County | | | |
| Beazer | Cardston County | | | 11 (2008) |
| Belloy | Birch Hills County | | | |
| Bickerdike | Yellowhead County | Post office closed in 1956 | 150 (1911) | |
| Bindloss | Special Area No. 2 | | | 14 (1991) |
| Bingham | County of Forty Mile No. 8 | | | |
| Bliss | Yellowhead County | | 652 (1956) | |
| Bow City | Vulcan County | | | |
| Brush Hill | County of Minburn No. 27 | | | |
| Buffalo | Special Area No. 2 | | | |
| Bulwark | County of Paintearth No. 18 | | | |
| Butte | Clearwater County | | | |
| Cadomin | Yellowhead County | | 1,053 (1941) | 40 (2016) |
| Cambria | Town of Drumheller | | 239 (1951) | |
| Chinook | Special Area No. 3 | | 241 (1921) | |
| Chisholm Mills | Municipal District of Lesser Slave River No. 124 | | 323 (1941) | 25 (2016) |
| Coal Valley | Yellowhead County | | 194 (1951) | |
| Coalspur | Yellowhead County | | 133 (1951) | |
| Commerce | Lethbridge County | | 360 (1921) | |
| Conquerville | County of Forty Mile No. 8 | | | |
| Conrad | County of Forty Mile No. 8 | | | |
| Del Bonita | Cardston County | | | 8 (2008) |
| Dorothy | Special Area No. 2 | | | 14 (1991) |
| East Coulee | Town of Drumheller | | 1,831 (1941) | 148 (2016) |
| Embarras Landing | Yellowhead County | | | |
| Evarts | Red Deer County | | 25 (1911) | |
| Faith | County of Forty Mile No. 8 | | | |
| Flowerdale | Special Area No. 2 | The settlement was abandoned in the early 1920s and destroyed by a prairie fire soon after. Flowerdale had a post office, Flowerdale Holdings, a general store, a schoolhouse and many other businesses. | | |
| Foothills | Yellowhead County | | 224 (1956) | |
| Frank | Municipality of Crowsnest Pass | | 1,178 (1906) | 85 (2016) |
| Frankburg | Municipal District of Foothills No. 31 | | | |
| Georgetown | Municipal District of Bighorn No. 8 | | | |
| Harrisville | Cardston County | | | |
| Judson | Cardston County | | | |
| Kimball | Cardston County | | | 26 (2008) |
| Kovach | Kananaskis Improvement District | | | |
| Legend | County of Forty Mile No. 8 | | | |
| Lehigh | Town of Drumheller | | 133 (1941) | |
| Lille | Municipal District of Ranchland No. 66 | | 413 (1906) | |
| Lorraine | Flagstaff County | | | |
| Luscar | Yellowhead County | Former coal mining community | 620 (1941) | |
| Mannix | Brazeau County | | 369 (1961) | |
| Maybutt | County of Warner No. 5 | | | |
| Mercoal | Yellowhead County | Former coal mining community | 977 (1951) | |
| Mintlaw | Red Deer County | | | |
| Mitford | Rocky View County | | | |
| Mountain Park | Yellowhead County | Former coal mining community | | |
| Nordegg | Clearwater County | Former coal mining community/National Historic Site | 875 (1951) | 53 (1986) |
| Pakowki | County of Forty Mile No. 8 | | | |
| Passburg | Municipality of Crowsnest Pass | | 305 (1911) | |
| Port Cornwall | Municipal District of Lesser Slave River No. 124 | | 200 (1913) | |
| Pendant d'Oreille | County of Forty Mile No. 8 | | | |
| Queenstown | Vulcan County | | 666 (1911) | 8 (2007) |
| Raley | Cardston County | | | |
| Retlaw | Municipal District of Taber | | 154 (1921) | |
| Rowley | Starland County | | 76 (1951) | 8 (2013) |
| Royalties | Foothills County | | 824 (1941) | |
| St. Michael | Lamont County | | 342 (1951) | 39 (1991) |
| Seebe | Municipal District of Bighorn No. 8 | | 147 (1951) | 0 (2016) |
| Sterco | Yellowhead County | | 224 (1941) | |
| Tail Creek Town | Stettler County | | | |
| Talbot | County of Paintearth No. 18 | | | |
| Taylorville | Cardston County | | | |
| Tollerton | Yellowhead County | | 180 (1916) | |
| Travers | Vulcan County | | | 0 (2007) |
| Twin River | Cardston County | | | |
| Violet Grove | Brazeau County | | 712 (1956) | 141 (2005) |
| Wardlow | Special Area No. 2 | | | 28 (1991) |
| Wayne | Town of Drumheller | | 601 (1941) | |
| Whiskey Gap | Cardston County | | | |
| Whitford | Lamont County | | | 6 (1981) |
| Whitla | County of Forty Mile No. 8 | | | |
| Wimborne | Kneehill County | | 90 (1951) | 20 (2016) |
| Windfall | Woodlands County | Former gas plant community founded by Canadian Fina Oil Ltd. | 101 (1961) | |
| Winnifred | County of Forty Mile No. 8 | | 80 (1941) | |
| Woolford | Cardston County | | | 13 (1986) |
| Wostok | Lamont County | | | 15 (1991) |
| Yates | Yellowhead County | | 301 (1951) | |

== See also ==
Ghost towns in Canada by province or territory
- List of census divisions of Alberta
- List of communities in Alberta
- List of ghost towns in Canada
- List of hamlets in Alberta
- List of Indian reserves in Alberta
- List of localities in Alberta
- List of municipal districts in Alberta
- List of municipalities in Alberta
- List of towns in Alberta
- List of villages in Alberta
