= Conrad, Alberta =

Conrad
- Location of Conrad in Alberta
- Coordinates: 49.5153°N 111.9847°W
- Country: Canada
- Province: Alberta
- Region: Southern Alberta
- Census division: 2
- Municipal district: County of Warner No. 5

Government
  - Governing body: County of Warner No. 5 Council
- Elevation: 946 m (3,104 ft)

Population (2001)
  - Total: 0
- Time zone: UTC−06:00 (Alberta Time)
- Postal code span: T0K 2P0
- Area code: +1-403
- Highways: Highway 61
- Waterways: Etzikom Coulee

Conrad was an unincorporated community in the County of Warner No. 5, Alberta, Canada, situated along the historic Red Coat Trail. Although nothing remains of the original locality, it lay 14 km (8.7 mi) to the east of Wrentham and 14 km (8.7 mi) to the west of Skiff.

== Toponymy ==
Conrad was named after either Charles Conrad, a local trader employed by the I. G. Baker Company, or writer Joseph Conrad.

== History ==
=== 20th century ===
In 1913, the Canadian Pacific Railway (CPR) established Conrad as a station along its Stirling Subdivision. Conrad was one of several communities planned by the railway, running from Judson to Etzikom.

A farming community developed, though recurring droughts throughout the 1920s resulted in poor crop yields that stunted Conrad's development. The locality had a modest population of 50 by 1930, but it would never contain the businesses or amenities found in other settlements along the Stirling Subdivision, such as post offices and general stores. Conrad received a grain elevator in 1934, which would prove to be the first of two.

By 1942, Conrad's population stood at around 15. Oil was discovered in the area the next year. The Conrad oil field supported sixteen wells at its peak, but interest largely moved on to prospects around Wrentham by the end of the 1950s.

Conrad as a community ceased to exist soon after, following the introduction of better roads that allowed farmers to ship their crops and livestock by road. The Conrad oil field remained in use, with four producing wells active in 1980. A local history published that year described Conrad as "[o]nce a town", containing only its grain elevators. Both elevators closed by 1987.

=== 21st century ===
In 2016, Forty Mile Rail purchased the Stirling Subdivision line, which had been abandoned by the CPR in 2006. Although Conrad's original siding tracks were removed by the CPR, the Conrad site remains in use for producer carloading as of 2023.

== See also ==
- List of communities in Alberta
