= Flowerdale =

Flowerdale may refer to several places:

In Australia

- Flowerdale, Tasmania
- Flowerdale, Victoria

In Canada

- Flowerdale, Alberta

in Scotland

- Flowerdale, Scotland, a mountain area and valley near to Gairloch
