= Judson, Alberta =

Judson
- Settlement
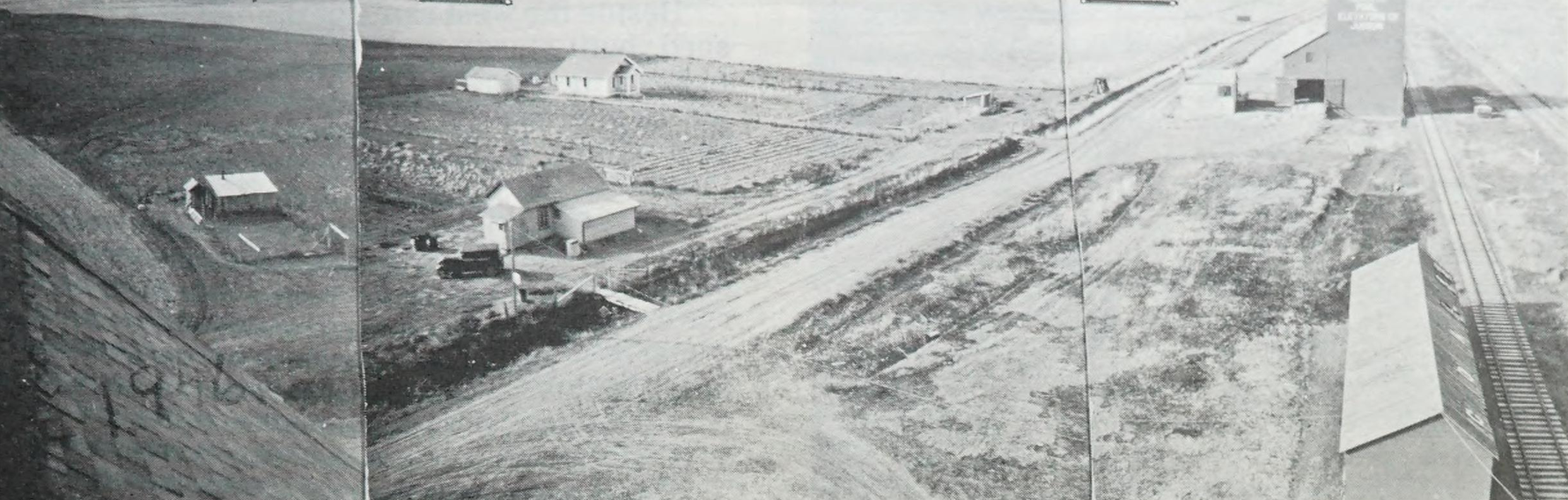
- Judson, photographed in 1946.

- Location of Judson in Alberta
- Coordinates: 49.5222°N 112.346°W
- Country: Canada
- Province: Alberta
- Region: Southern Alberta
- Census division: Division No. 2, Alberta
- County: County of Warner No. 5
- Time zone: UTC−06:00 (Alberta Time)
- Highways: Alberta Highway 61

Judson is a former unincorporated community in southern Alberta, Canada, within the County of Warner No. 5. Once the site of a railway station, Judson was retained as a toponym into the 21st century for farms and properties in the vicinity.

It is located on Highway 61 between the villages of Stirling and Wrentham, approximately 45 kilometres (28 mi) southeast of Lethbridge.

== Toponymy ==
Judson was named for Judson Bemis, founder of the Bemis Brothers Bag Company. The area is also known as Judson Flat or Judson Flats.

== History ==
=== Early development and Stirling Subdivision: 1900–1914 ===
Several homesteads began operating in the area now known as Judson in the early 20th century, owned mostly by settlers from the United States.

Families generated sufficient demand for formal schooling by 1911, when residents of the Stirling area formed the Owen School District #2378. With a loan of $1,600 from the Union Bank of Canada for construction, the school board opened Owen School in the fall of that year. It was named for William Owen, one of the area's earliest permanent settlers, and stood roughly 3.2 kilometres (2.0 mi) from Judson.

In November 1912, the Canadian Pacific Railway (CPR) announced plans to introduce new railway stations in southern Alberta, as part of a larger connection between Lethbridge and Weyburn, Saskatchewan. Judson would be the name of one of these planned stations, alongside Wrentham, Conrad, and Skiff.

Plots in Judson went up for sale in June 1913, and the siding opened the next year. Judson and its sister localities fell on the Stirling Subdivision, which also stopped at the nearby settlements of Legend, Foremost, Nemiskam, and Etzikom.

=== Rest of the 20th century: 1915–2000 ===
Judson received its first grain elevator in 1917, and a second in 1929. By 1930, Judson's population stood at 200, according to a promotional publication by the CPR. Abnormally wet weather in the years after Judson's founding ensured the early success of its farms, but the dry climate of the 1920s and 1930s led to depopulation along the Stirling Subdivision. Judson was one of seven localities along the line that did not grow enough to require its own post office.

Though Judson's later development never surpassed its peak in the early 20th century, the area retained an active farming community. Two Hutterite colonies were also founded in the area in the 1930s: New Rockport Hutterite Colony (1932), established 8 kilometres (5.0 mi) from Judson, and Rock Lake Hutterite Colony (1934), established 16 kilometres (9.9 mi) from Judson. In June 1939, Owen School closed; its students were transferred to nearby Wrentham. Also in 1939, Judson's name was recognized by the federal government for mapping purposes. A Massey-Harris garage operated in Judson between 1948 and 1952.

The CPR phased out passenger rail services along the Stirling Subdivision in the 1960s, though freight services continued through Judson. Both of Judson's grain elevators remained in use until the early 1980s, when they were closed and ultimately demolished.

=== 21st century: 2001–present ===
The CPR abandoned rail services to Judson in 2006, prompting efforts by local farmers to assume control of the track. Forty Mile Rail formed to acquire and revive the line in 2016. As of 2026, Forty Mile Rail uses a transfer track in Judson to facilitate grain shipments, transport machinery, and ship other goods for local farms.

== Places of interest ==
The original Judson siding's whistle post remains standing at the site as of 2021. The foundations of Judson's grain elevators are also visible.

== See also ==
- List of communities in Alberta
