= Saunders Creek, Alberta =

Ghost town in Alberta, Canada

Coordinates: 52.457625°N 115.721800°W

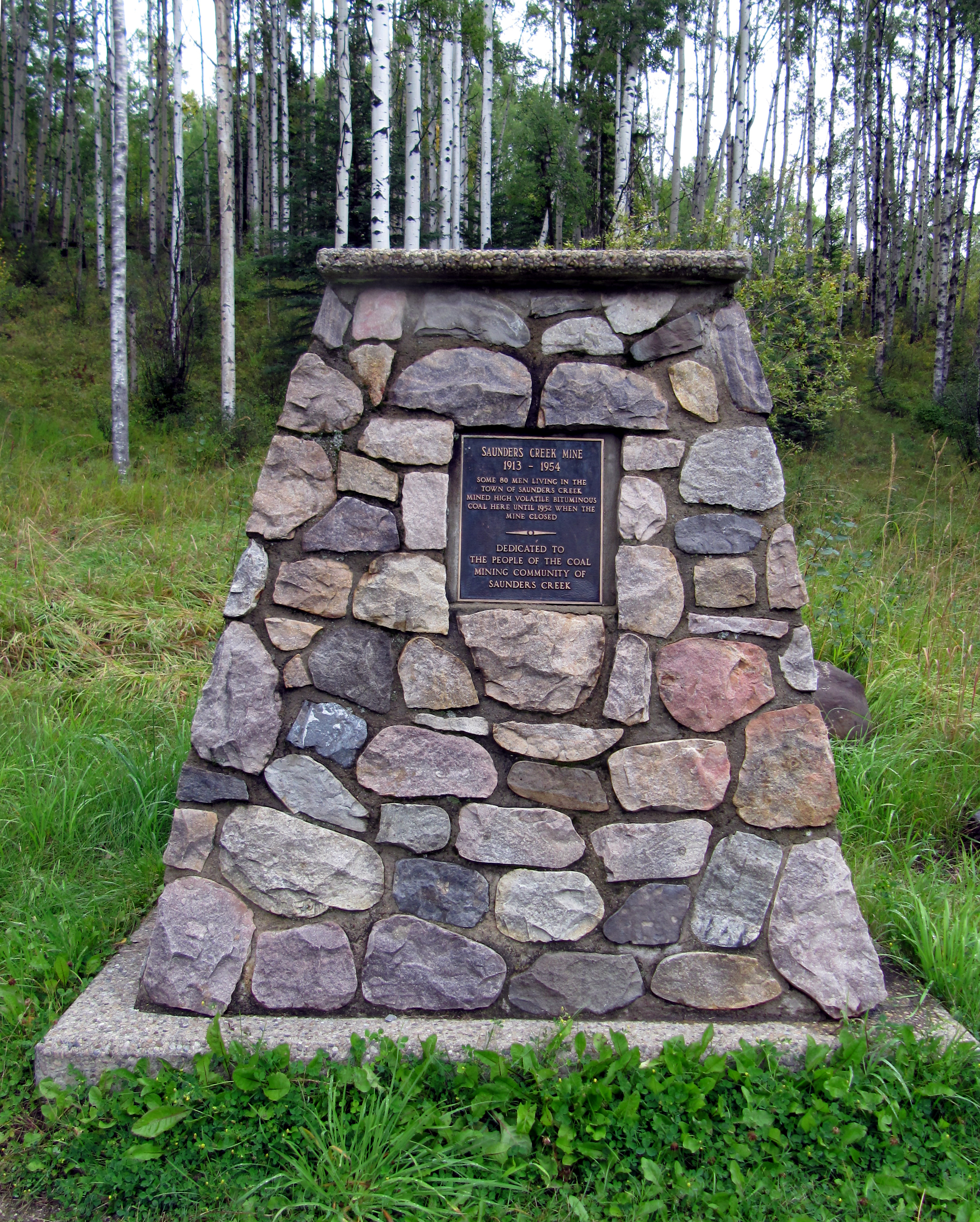
Commemorative plaque at Saunders Creek

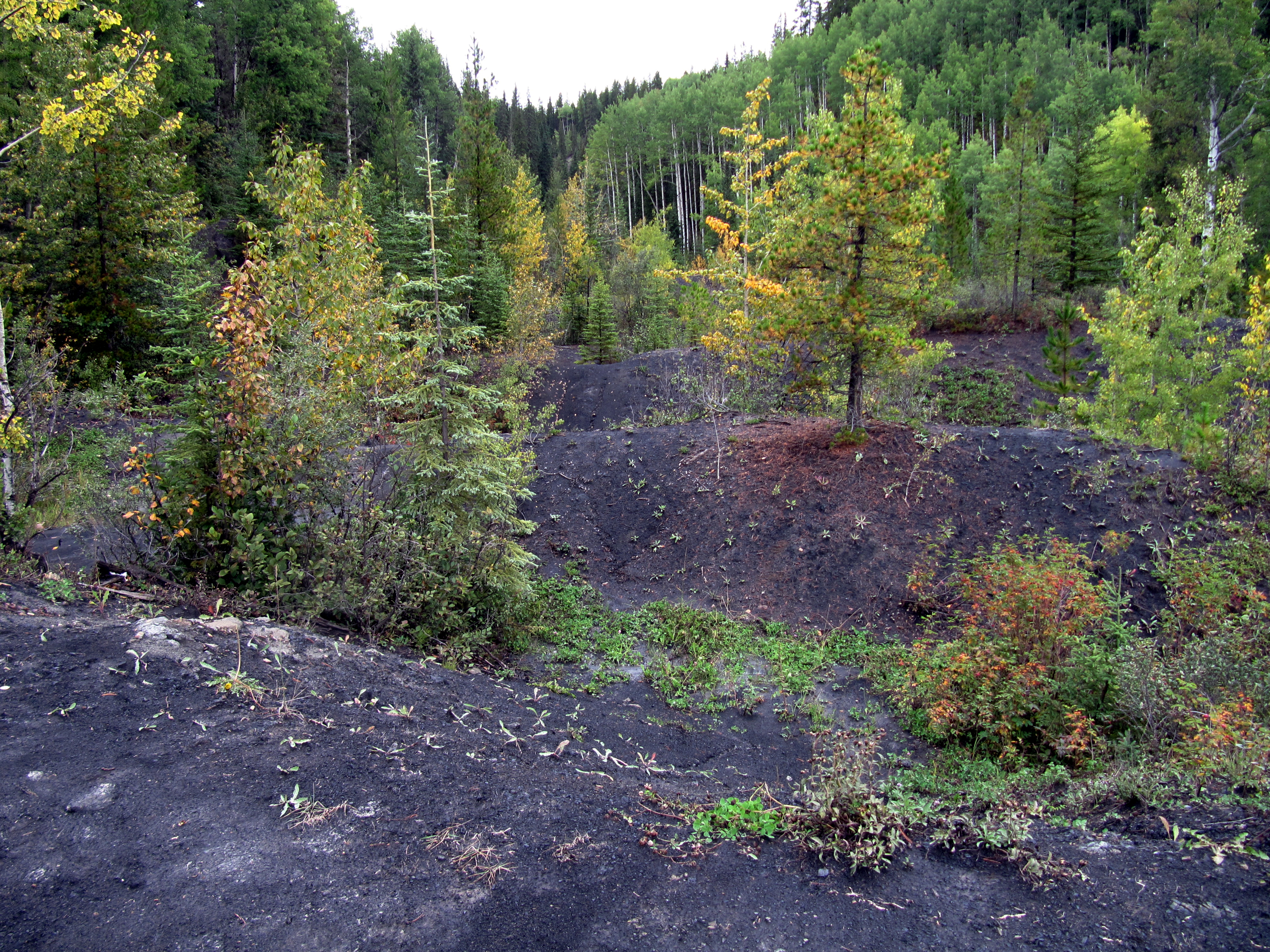
Coal waste piles at Saunders Creek

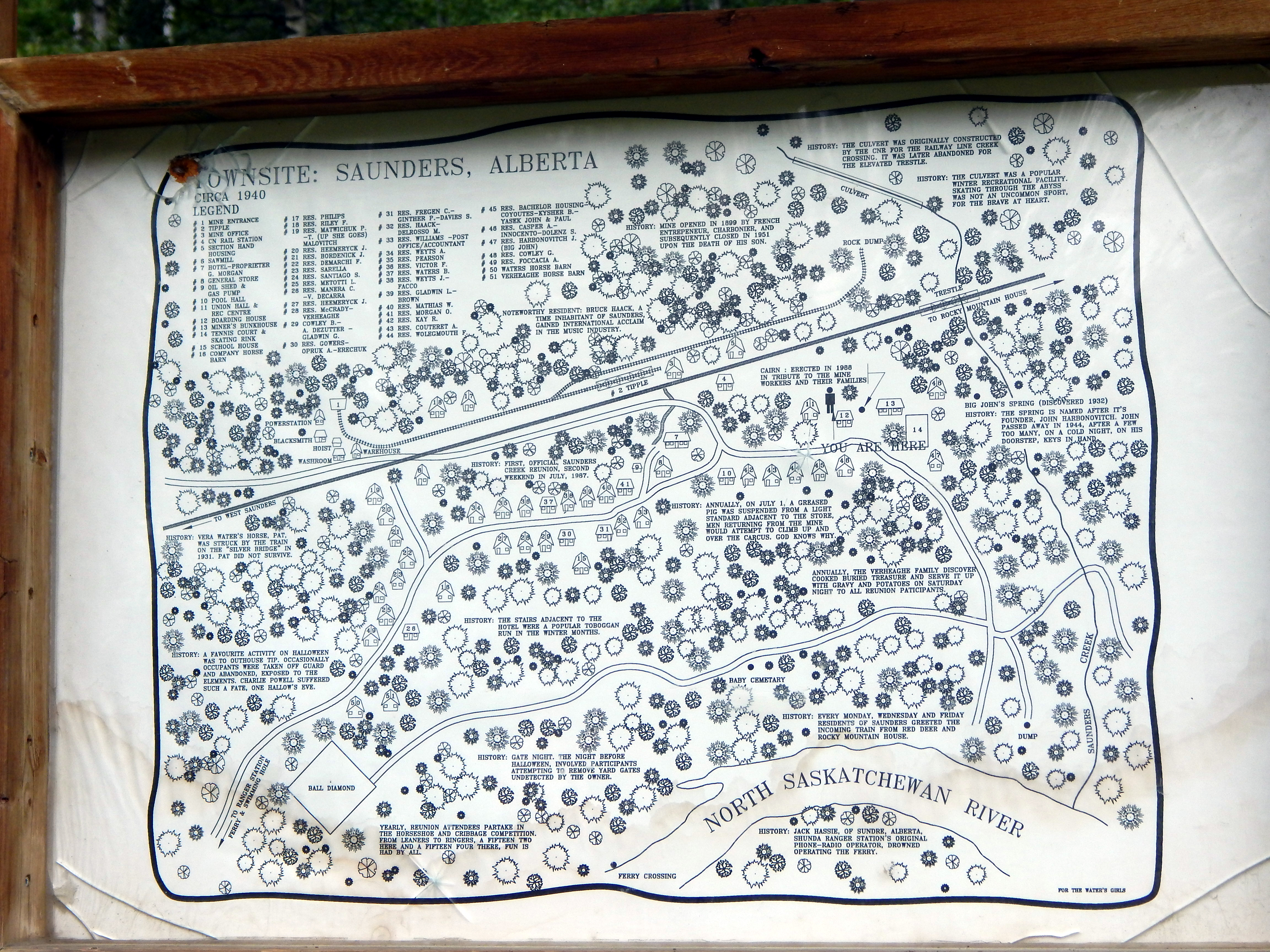
Historical information poster at Saunders Creek

Saunders Creek is a ghost town in west-central Alberta, Canada. Built as a coal mining community, the town existed from 1913 to 1954. It is located in the foothills of the Canadian Rockies near the David Thompson Highway, about 55 km west of the town of Rocky Mountain House. It was named for Saunders Creek, a small stream that runs immediately west of the townsite. The North Saskatchewan River flows nearby to the south.

== History ==
Prior to the opening of the Brazeau Branch rail line in 1913, the only access into the Saunders Creek area was via trails by horse, or via the North Saskatchewan River by sledge when the river was frozen or by canoe when it was not. The Brazeau Branch line was part of the Canadian Northern Railway (which later became part of the Canadian National Railway), and was built to transport coal from the mine at Nordegg to markets to the east and south. New towns like Saunders Creek, Alexo, and Harlech quickly sprang up near the tracks to support additional coal mines.

Saunders Creek had a railway station, a school house, a hotel, a boarding house, a rooming house, a union hall, and about 35 cottages, as well as a number of mine buildings. Recreation facilities included tennis courts, a skating rink, a baseball diamond, and a pool hall, and the town had hockey and baseball teams. The mine had steam boilers and electrical generating facilities, and all buildings in the town had electric lighting and water.

The coal in the Saunders Creek area is of high-volatile bituminous "C" rank and is part of the early Paleocene Coalspur Formation. Fossils from the Paleocene period have been found near Saunders Creek, including a possible pantodont upper molar and Paleocene fossil leaves.

The mine at Saunders Creek was operated by the Bighorn and Saunders Creek Collieries, Ltd. and worked a single seam that was about 4.5 to 5.0 feet (1.4 to 1.5 m) thick with a shallow dip to the northeast. Mining was done by underground room and pillar methods and, from 1926 to 1940, by the longwall method. Production ranged from 200 to 350 short tons (180 to 320 t) daily, depending on the season. The product had a heat content of from 11,500 to 12,500 British Thermal Units per pound and was sold primarily in the Prairie Provinces and western Ontario. Total production over the life of the mine was 853,100 tonnes.

Coal markets went into decline when the railroads started replacing steam locomotives with diesel, and the mine at Saunders Creek closed in 1954. The town was abandoned and the buildings were sold and removed, or dismantled.

As of 2016, no buildings remain at the Saunders Creek townsite, but it is a popular camping spot and former residents and their descendants have held reunions there in the summer. An information poster at the site (pictured at left) relates some of their memories. A few quotes from the poster provide a picture of life in this rather isolated small town:

"The stairs adjacent to the hotel were a popular toboggan run in the winter months."

"Annually, on July 1, a greased pig was suspended from a light standard adjacent to the store; men returning from the mine would attempt to climb up and over the [carcass]. God knows why."

"Vera Water's horse Pat was struck by the train on the "silver bridge" in 1931. Pat did not survive."

"The culvert was a popular winter recreation facility. Skating through the abyss was not an uncommon sport for the brave of heart."

"Gate Night, the night before Halloween, involved participants attempting to remove yard gates undetected by owners."
