= Tollerton =

Tollerton may refer to:

- Tollerton, Alberta, Canada
- Tollerton, Nottinghamshire, England
- Tollerton, North Yorkshire, England
  - Tollerton railway station
