= Bankhead, Alberta =

Bankhead
- Locality
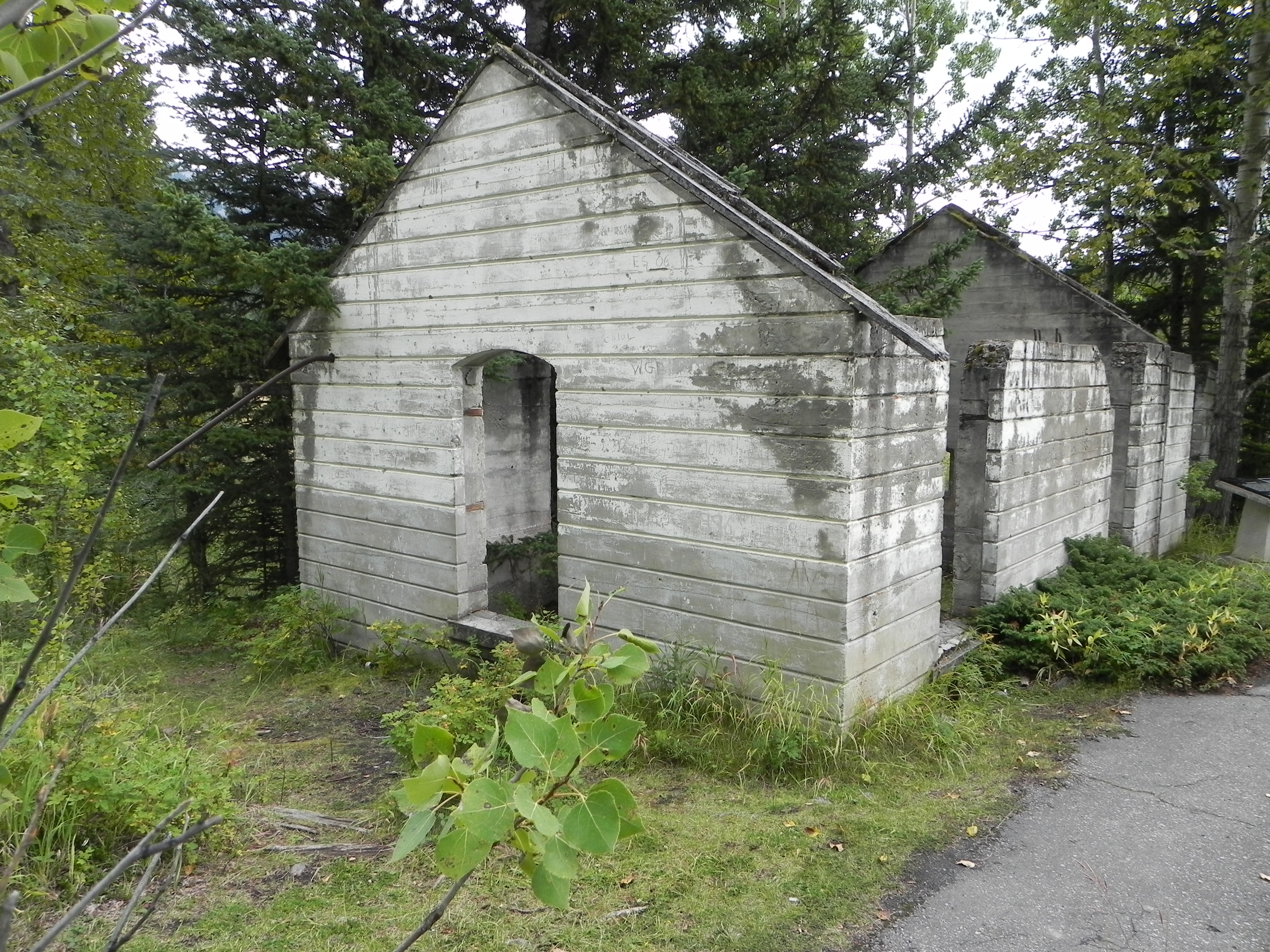
- Ruins of the lamp house at Bankhead

- Location within Alberta
- Country: Canada
- Province: Alberta
- Improvement district: ID No. 9 (Banff)

Government
  - Type: Unincorporated
- Time zone: UTC−06:00 (Alberta Time)
- Area codes: 403, 587, 825

Population history of Bankhead
Year	Pop.	±%
1911	694	—
1951	58	−91.6%
Source: Statistics Canada

Bankhead, Alberta was a small coal mining town that existed in the early twentieth century, in Banff National Park, near the town of Banff, Alberta. The mine was located at Cascade Mountain, which contains high grade anthracite coal deposits. The Bankhead coal mine was operated by the Pacific Coal Company, a subsidiary of the Canadian Pacific Railway, which needed the coal to fuel its steam engines. The mine began operations in 1903.

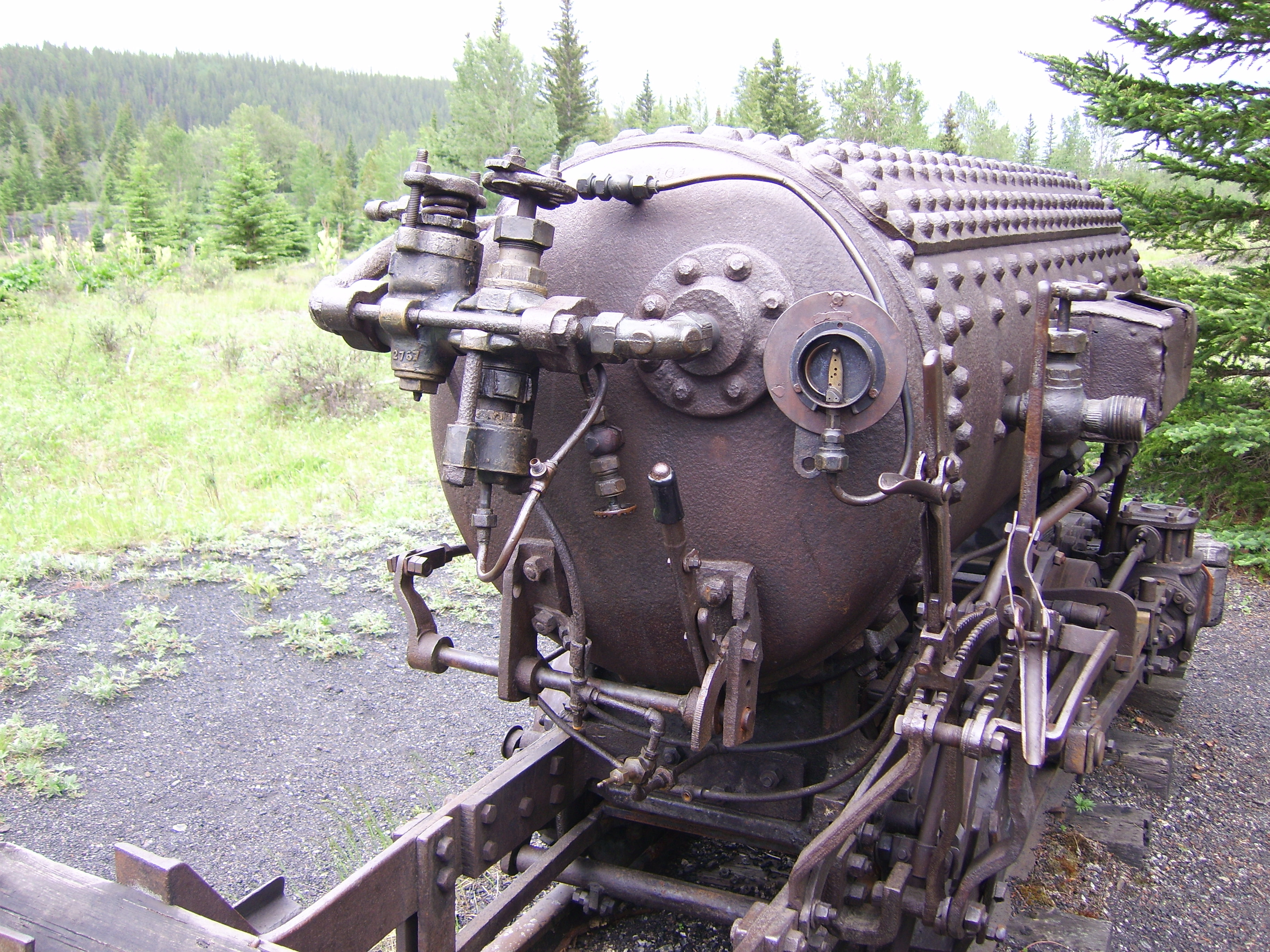
Air powered (fireless) locomotive on display at Bankhead

A local newspaper report published 17 June 1922 indicated that notices of the closure of the Bankhead Mines had recently been posted through that town. The notices made it clear that on and after 15 July the staff of Bankhead Mines would not be required and the coal operations would cease. The report concluded: "This would indicate that after the above date Bankhead will be a dead town so far as coal mining is concerned." This report concluded that no reasons were given for the closure, although it was generally understood that mining there had not been profitable. There had been a strike at the mine two months before this announcement, and the mines had been closed since that time. Another report on the mine closure noted that around 200 to 300 men were employed there with the output of coal running between 500 and 600 tons per day. The town population was around 1,000 people.

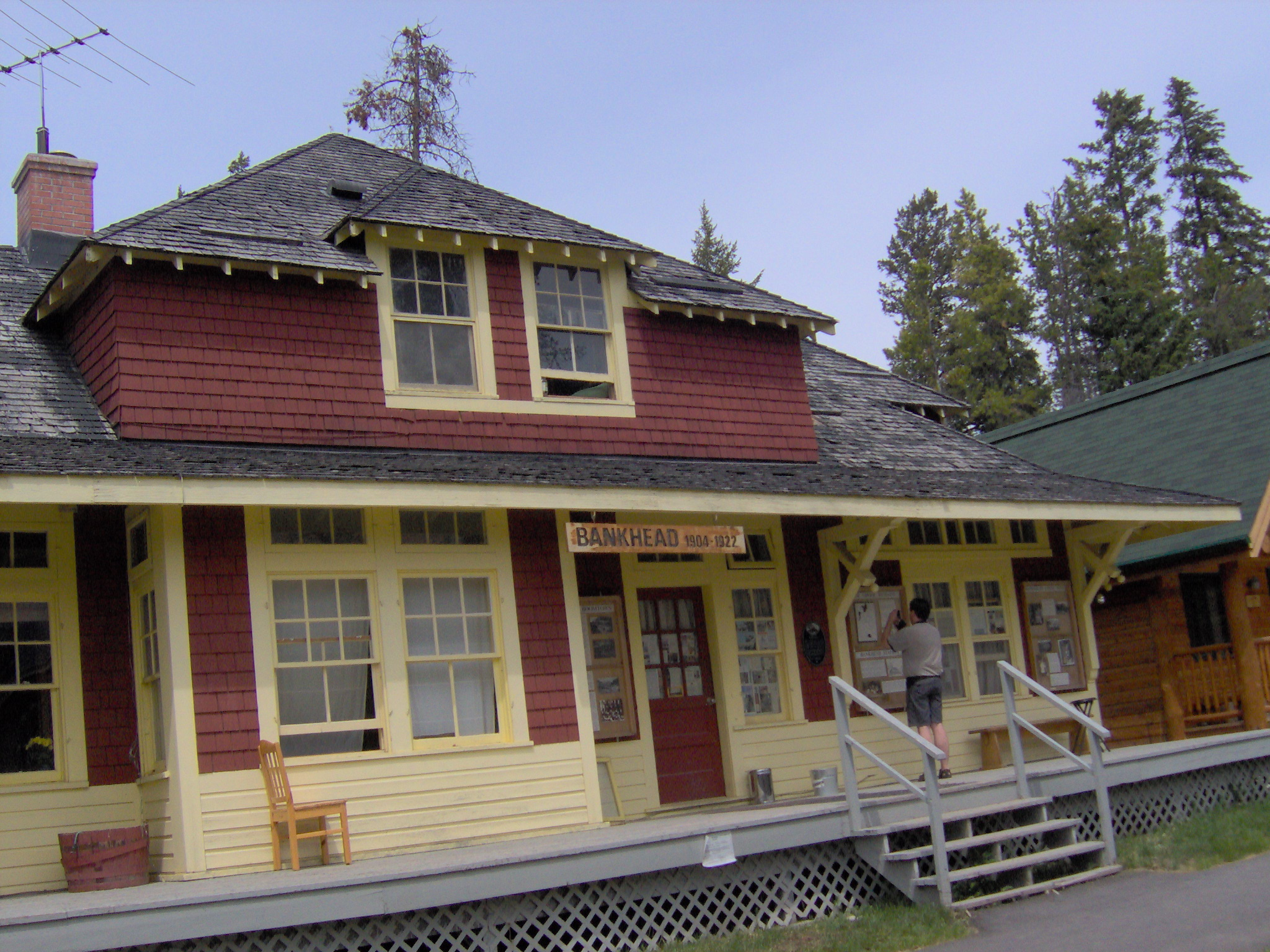
Bankhead Railway Station, now relocated to Tunnel Mountain Road in Banff

All of Bankhead's buildings were built and owned by the company and rented to the residents. In 1926, many of the town's buildings were moved to Banff and Canmore. The Bankhead Railway Station now sits on the grounds of the Banff Hostel on Tunnel Mountain Road. It has a map of the Bankhead townsite posted outside its front door.

Today, an interpretive trail runs through Lower Bankhead. Signs are placed along the trail identifying the major buildings, as well as other interesting facts. Many foundations of buildings are visible. One building remains intact and contains displays viewed through the windows. Remains of the town are also visible adjacent to the Upper Bankhead parking lot.

Bankhead is located on the Lake Minnewanka road, just a few minutes drive from the Banff townsite or the Trans Canada Highway.

Near Bankhead was another coal mine, Anthracite. This mine was a failure because of heavy water inflow in the underground. The Anthracite mine shut down in 1904 and was abandoned.

== See also ==
- List of ghost towns in Alberta
