= Legend, Alberta =

Coordinates: 49.4844445°N 111.6097222°E

Legend
- Former locality
- Location of the former community of Legend Legend (Alberta)
- Country: Canada
- Province: Alberta
- Region: Southern Alberta
- Census division: 1
- Municipal district: County of Forty Mile No. 8
- Settled: 1900

Government
  - Type: Unincorporated

Population
  - Total: 0
- Time zone: UTC−06:00 (Alberta Time)

Legend was an unincorporated community in Alberta, Canada, in the County of Forty Mile No. 8. Situated along Highway 61 between Range Road 125 and Range Road 130, it constitutes one of many ghost towns along the historic Red Coat Trail route. It lies 12 km (7.5 mi) west of Foremost and 13 km (8.1 mi) east of Skiff.

== Toponymy ==
Legend's name derives from a railway siding that was built in the area in the 1910s. The locality's name was pronounced Lee-gend, mimicking the pronunciation used by railway conductors in the early 20th century.

According to local lore, Legend was originally named 'Leg End', as it formed the end of the railway when construction temporarily stalled in the 1910s. However, its name was announced as 'Legend' in 1913.

== Topography ==
Legend falls within Alberta's extreme southeastern corner, which is characterized by a semi-arid climate and flat prairie grasslands interspersed with coulees.

=== Flora and fauna ===
Speargrass, wheatgrass and blue grama grasses are the dominant vegetation in Legend. Populations of porcupine, mountain cottontail, pronghorn antelope, and short-horned lizard are found in the area.

== History ==
=== Before the Common Era ===
Folsom and Eden points were discovered in Legend in the 20th century, indicating the presence of Indigenous peoples from the prehistoric Folsom tradition and Plano cultures.

=== 20th century ===
In 1913, the Canadian Pacific Railway (CPR) established a siding and whistle stop in the area, forming part of the Stirling Subdivision along the Lethbridge-Weyburn line. Legend was one of a series of planned communities that would span from Judson to Etzikom, but settlers would not arrive until 1917.

Crop farming proved difficult from the time of Legend's founding, owing to a pervasive district-wide drought that peaked during the Dust Bowl of the 1930s. Among the more successful residents were sheep farmers, who established pastures for their livestock. Despite the area's inconsistent agricultural performance, the Alberta Wheat Pool opened a grain elevator in 1929, and the United Grain Growers followed suit in 1936.

In 1930, the CPR reported that Legend had a population of approximately 100 people. Businesses in Legend included three general stores, a pharmacy, a confectioner, and a hardware retailer. Locals organized the Legend School District No. 4519 in September that year.

A post office opened to serve the community in 1937, the same year the Foremost School Division absorbed the Legend School District. By this time, Legend had entered a state of decline, owing to years of poor agricultural yields. Legend's last remaining general store closed in 1946, a year before the locality's name began to appear on federal maps.

In 1969, Legend's post office closed, and mail services moved to nearby Foremost. By 1985, Legend's grain elevators were all that remained of the former settlement. Both elevators ceased operations in 1998.

=== 21st century ===
In 2006, the Canadian Pacific Railway announced plans to abandon the Stirling Subdivision line, including Legend's siding. The subdivision was purchased by Forty Mile Rail in 2016, which resumed freight operations along the line. In 2019, Forty Mile Rail received funding from Transport Canada to restore Legend's siding and introduce storage facilities.

Legend's grain elevators, the last surviving structures from the former settlement, were demolished by 2021. Legend's name remains in use to refer to both the siding and the geographic area.

== See also ==
- List of communities in Alberta
