= Improvement District No. 9 =

Improvement district in Alberta, Canada

Improvement District No. 9 (Banff)
- Improvement district
- Location within Alberta
- Coordinates: 51°34′05″N 116°04′10″W
- Country: Canada
- Province: Alberta
- Region: Alberta's Rockies
- Census division: No. 15
- Established: April 1, 1945
- Renumbered: January 1, 1969

Government
  - Governing body: I.D. No. 9 Council
  - Chairperson: Dave Schebek
  - CAO: Danielle Morine

Area (2021)
  - Land: 6,751.09 km^{2} (2,606.61 sq mi)

Population (2021)
  - Total: 1,004
  - Density: 0.1/km^{2} (0.26/sq mi)
- Time zone: UTC−06:00 (Alberta Time)
- Website: http://improvementdistrict9.ca

Improvement District No. 9 (Banff), or Improvement District No. 9, is an improvement district in Alberta, Canada. Coextensive with Banff National Park in Alberta's Rockies, the improvement district is the municipality that provides local government for the portion of the park outside the Town of Banff.

== History ==
Improvement District (I.D.) No. 9 was originally formed as I.D. No. 51 on April 1, 1945, through the amalgamation of I.D. Nos. 224, 255, 285, and 317, as well as portions of I.D. Nos. 193, 223, 253, 254, 284, 314, 315, 316, 347, 348, and 378. I.D. No. 51 was renumbered to I.D. No. 9 on January 1, 1969.

Formerly part of I.D. No. 9, Banff separated from the improvement district and incorporated as a town on January 1, 1990.

== Geography ==
=== Communities and localities ===
The following urban municipalities are surrounded by Improvement District No. 9:

Cities

- none

Towns

- Banff

Villages

- none

Summer villages

- none

The following hamlets are located within Improvement District No. 9:

Hamlets

- none

The following localities are located within Improvement District No. 9:

Localities

- Anthracite
- Bankhead
- Castle Junction
- Castle Mountain
- Duthil
- Eldon
- Lake Louise
- Massive
- Saskatchewan River Crossing
- Sawback
- Temple

Other places

- Georgetown

== Demographics ==
In the 2021 Census of Population conducted by Statistics Canada, Improvement District No. 9 had a population of 1,004 living in 111 of its 123 total private dwellings, a change of −2.3% from its 2016 population of 1,028. With a land area of 6,751.09 km^{2} (2,606.61 sq mi), it had a population density of 0.1/km^{2} (0.4/sq mi) in 2021.

In the 2016 Census of Population conducted by Statistics Canada, Improvement District No. 9 had a population of 1,028 living in 30 of its 31 total private dwellings, a change of −12.5% from its 2011 population of 1,175. With a land area of 6,787.28 km^{2} (2,620.58 sq mi), it had a population density of 0.2/km^{2} (0.4/sq mi) in 2016.

== Government ==
Like all improvements districts in Alberta, Improvement District (I.D.) No. 9 is administered by Alberta Municipal Affairs. However, residents of I.D. No. 9 do elect an advisory council consisting of a chairperson and four councillors to oversee the activities of municipal staff.

== See also ==
- List of communities in Alberta
