= Maybutt, Alberta =

Settlement in Alberta, Canada (est. 1890)

Maybutt
- Unincorporated community
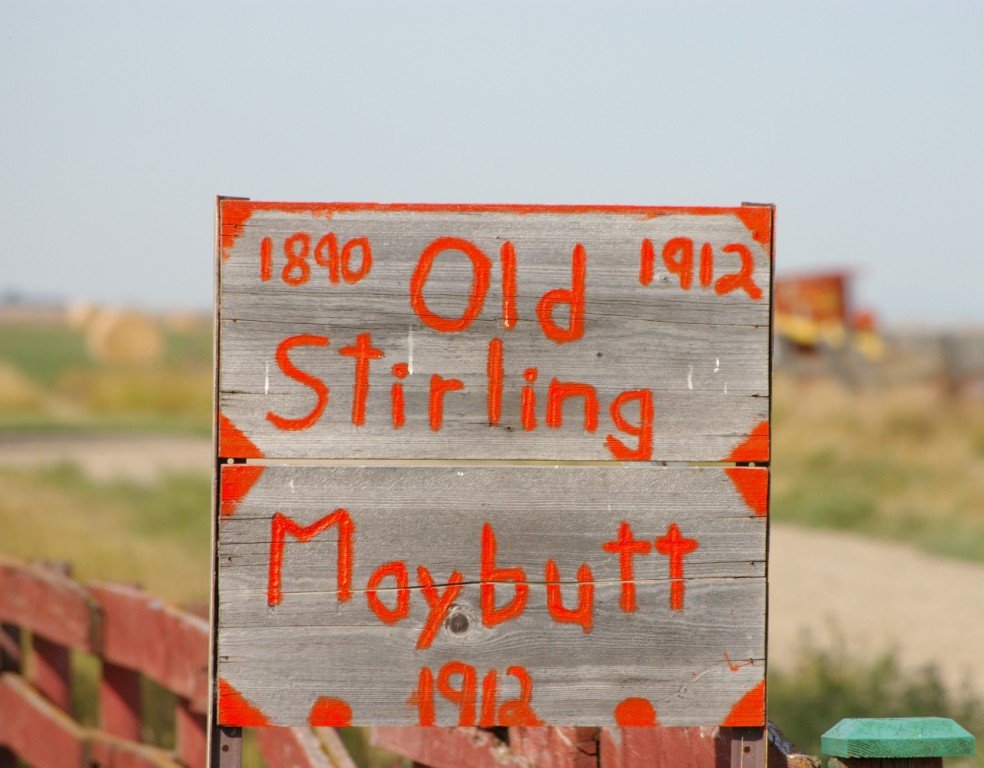
- Nickname: The Junction Town (1912)
- Location within Alberta
- Coordinates: 49.519°N 112.528°W
- Country: Canada
- Province: Alberta
- Region: Southern Alberta
- Census division: 2
- Municipal district: County of Warner No. 5
- Founded: 1910

Government
  - Governing body: Warner County Council
  - MP: Jim Hillyer
  - MLA: Gary Bikman
- Elevation: 935 m (3,068 ft)
- Time zone: UTC−06:00 (Alberta Time)
- Postal code span: TOK 2EO
- Area code: +1-403
- Highways: Highway 4 Highway 61
- Waterways: Etzikom Coulee; Kipp Coulee; Stirling Lake; Milk River Ridge Reservoir

Maybutt, also known as "New Stirling" or "New Town", is a former locality in the County of Warner No. 5, Alberta, Canada. The community is situated 1 km north of the Village of Stirling just off the CANAMEX Corridor between Lethbridge and the Canada–US border. The community has become a bedroom community to Lethbridge, with many newer acreages being developed in the area. The footprint of Maybutt is defined by its historic boundary roads, Young St. (Range Rd. 195, {undeveloped}), Sunnyside Ave. (Township Rd. 64D), Front St. & Lorne Ave (Range Rd. 194B), and Etzikom Ave (Township Rd. 70). York St., First Ave. and Second Ave. are the only interior streets left of the original street grid of Maybutt (see 'Advertisement poster').

The only original structures remaining currently are a brick home on Second Ave, built around 1910, the other, the Alberta Wheat Pool residence at the corner of York St. & Lorne Ave. The 1922 Ellison grain elevator stands opposite side of the tracks of Range Rd. 194B on Elevator Road, although built as a classic grain Elevator design, the elevator has been heavily modified after suffering a fire in 2013.

== History ==
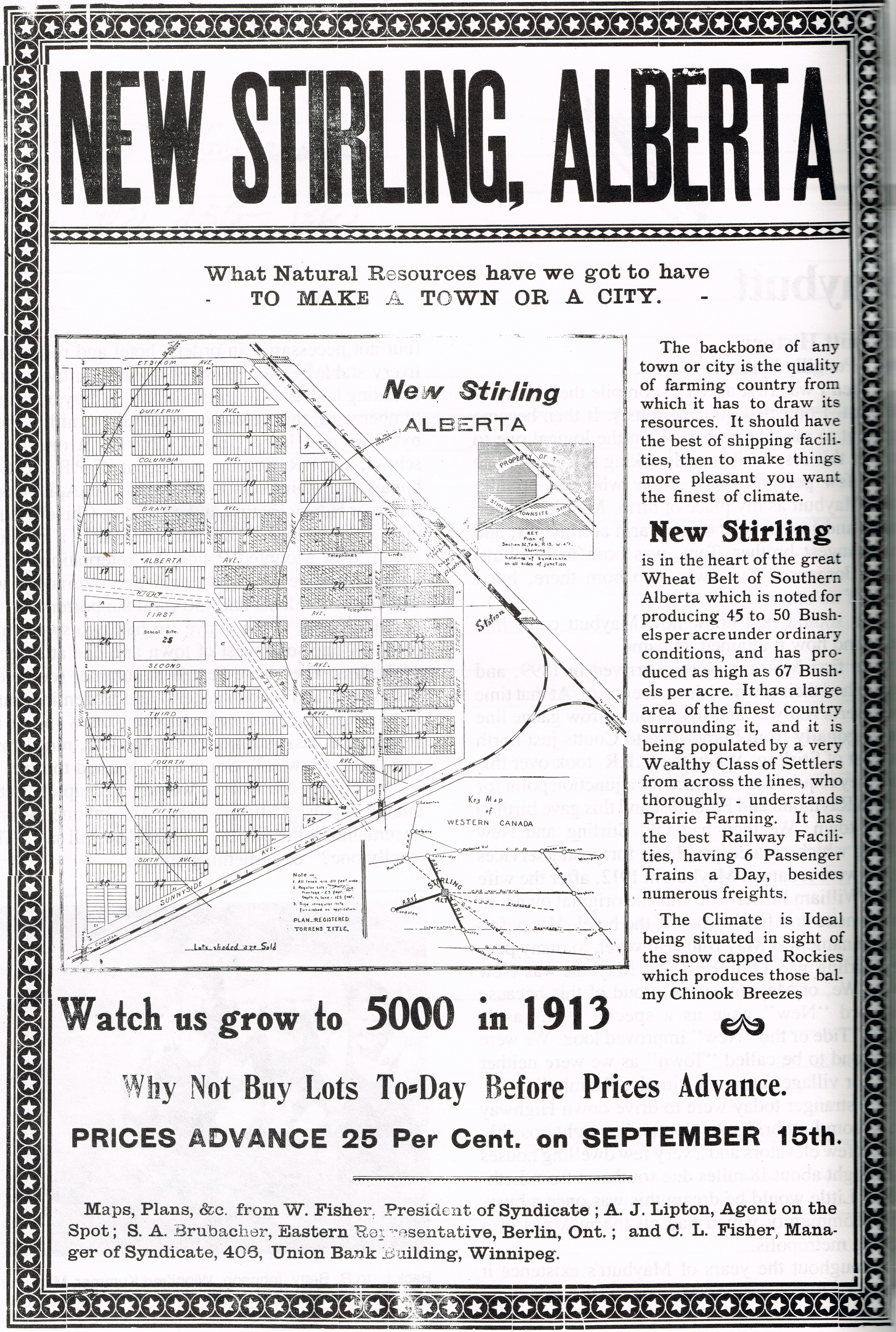
Advertisement poster for "New Stirling", later Maybutt

On May 5, 1899, Theodore Brandley and the first band of Latter Day Saint (LDS) settlers arrived at the Stirling railway siding (formerly known as 18 Mile Lake), southeast of present-day Maybutt. Theodore Brandley with the help of Charles Ora Card established the community of Stirling 1 km south of Maybutt.

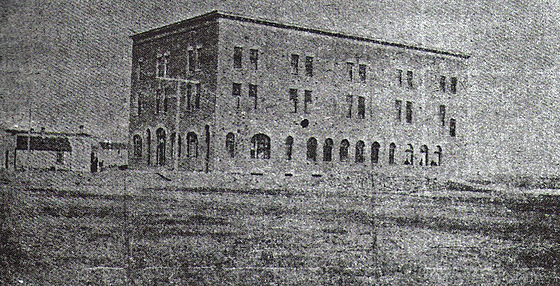
Prairie Queen Hotel at the corner of First Avenue and Front Street

In 1909-1910 the Canadian Pacific Railway (CPR) expressed plans to take over the Alberta Coal and Railway Co. from Lethbridge to Great Falls, Montana. CPR needed to build a junction point for the construction of the Stirling-Weyburn branch line, with speculation of Canadian National Railway building a branch line from Fort Macleod to Havre through Stirling.

The new junction was built at the West 1/2 of Section 32, Township 6, Range 19, West of 4th Meridian. This would turn out to be an ideal location for a new community to be established. Mr. William Fisher, a real estate promoter and newcomer to Alberta, took advantage of this and created "The Stirling Townsite Syndicate", which establish the community of, New Stirling. Mr. Fisher bought up a majority of the lots and began to advertise promotional posters as far as Eastern Canada to promote the new hamlet. Many posters stated, "Watch us Grow to 5,000 in 1913"; others were absurd, depicting 18 Mile Lake (Stirling Lake) with a yacht, row boats and beautiful groves of trees lining the shores. For many who lived in the area, the lake was known as a smelly slough and the shores were nothing but barren semiarid grassland.

Mr. Fisher had elaborate plans for the new community, one of which was to construct a large hotel, suitably named, the Prairie Queen. It was a beautiful three story brick veneered hotel with all the modern conveniences of the time, such as steam heat, electric lights, and even a bar room that was never used as such. Upon completion the Prairie Queen was stated to be the largest hotel ever built in a new community west of Winnipeg.

The "Boom Years"; 1910-1920 would bring much prosperity to this little community of over 100 residents, with over 150 rural supporters. It hosted many of the amenities of a larger community centre, including its very own local newspaper, (The New Stirling Star), As well, in no particular order, other businesses included; livery stables, a Union Bank of Canada branch, a two-storey boarding house, two general stores, a dry business, lumber yards, three grain elevators and flour mill, Presbyterian and late United Church, C.P.R. section homes for railway maintenance, an Apiary and Superior Honey Factory, warehouse, Chinese laundry and restaurant, a resident North-West Mounted Police, an International Harvest Machine Company, and the elegant 50-room Prairie Queen Hotel. Fisher had plans to add a stately opera house and a new schoolhouse was in the planning stages, to house the growing student population; neither got past the planning stages.

By 1912, confusion between the post office of nearby "Old Town" Stirling and "New Town" started the debate of renaming New Stirling. It was decided by Fisher that New Stirling would be renamed Maybutt, by combining his wife's first and maiden name "May and Butt".

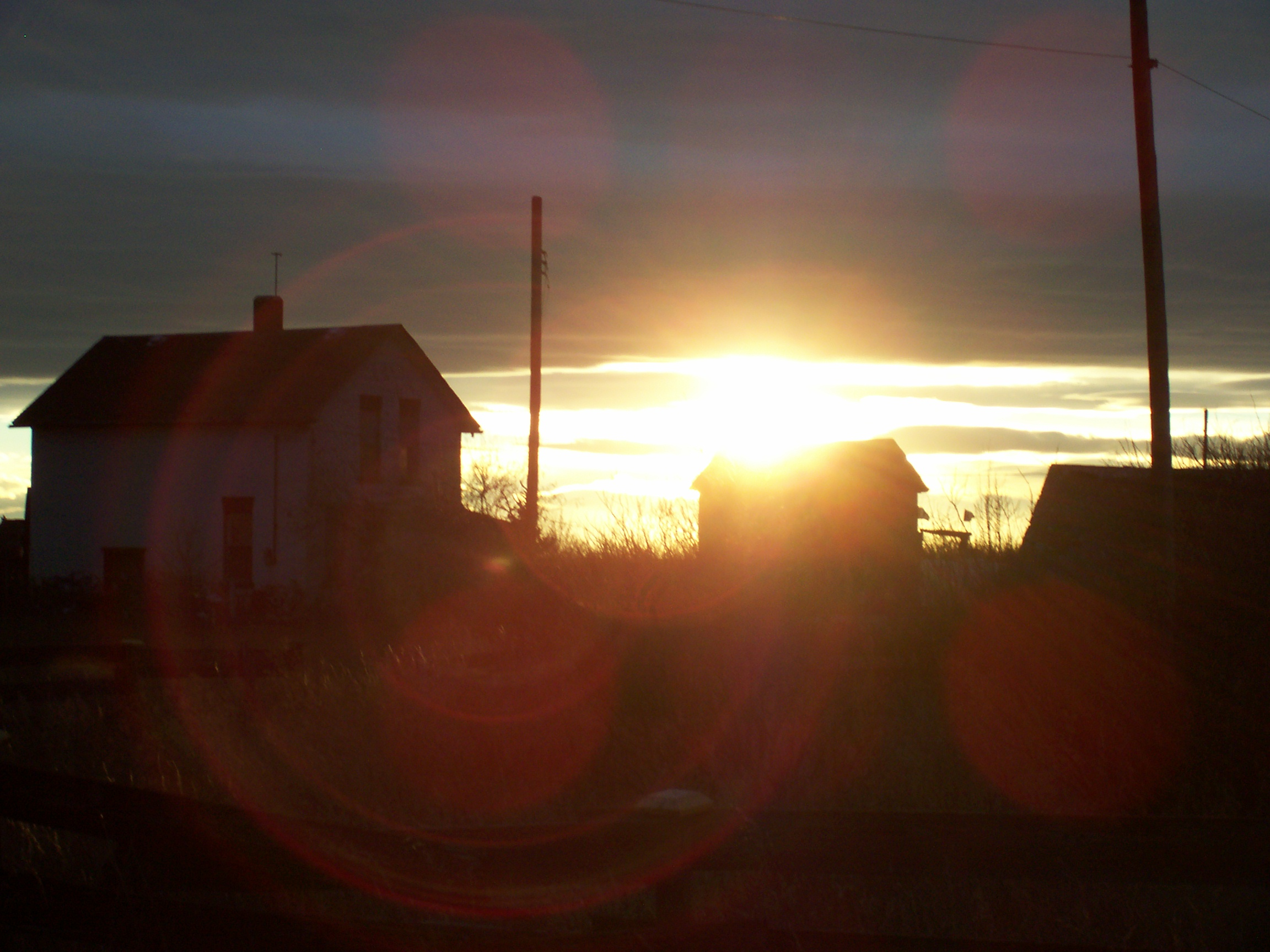
Sun setting on Maybutt

The "Decline"; starting with poor crop yields, droughts, and falling grain prices in the mid-1920s through the 1930s, the Dust Bowl era hit Maybutt very hard. Residents of Maybutt and nearby Stirling began fleeing to find economic stability elsewhere. Some took their homes and businesses with them. The Stately Prairie Queen Hotel had switched hands multiple times and was in the process of demolition by 1918. The third floor had been completely removed, when a group of Montana Men saw it as an investment. The hotel was again made habitable, now a two-story structure. The deal was never made and the hotel fell into a bankrupt estate, eventually becoming a bank. It had sold once again and was turned back into a hotel. The bar room that was never used as one, due to being near a local "option area", was used by the community as the communities school, a residences and a bank. The school closed and children were bused to Stirling in 1924, the schoolhouse never built. In 1932 the hotel was bought one last time and dismantled and the materials were used to build a grocery store and pool hall in Magrath.

By the end of the 1930s only a handful of citizens remained. The service station, grain elevators, post office, and a few residences were all that was left by 1960. The post office closed shortly after, soon to follow was the service station. On July 30, 1970, the community lost its hamlet status and was rescinded as an unincorporated place under the County of Warner No. 5. In 1973 the Ellison elevator was sold to a farmer for private grain storage and the 1910 Taylor Milling elevator was demolished that same year. Alberta Wheat Pool (AWP) remained the only business in the community until its successor, Agricore United took over Alberta Wheat Pool, and built a larger concrete elevator to the east, the original 1928 AWP elevator was no longer needed and demolished in 1998.

=== Maybutt School ===
Classes were originally held at the Presbyterian Church, a Chinese restaurant and later the Prairie Queen Hotel at the corner of First Avenue and Front Street, Maybutt. Plans to build a school house never got past the planning stages and children from Maybutt were bused to the neighbouring town of Stirling in 1924.

== Media ==
Maybutt is served by a number of regional newspapers including the Westwind Weekly, Lethbridge Herald, and Prairie Post. In the beginnings, with the arrival of a pioneering optimism, the settlement of New Stirling needed a way to communicate its successes to local residents. A newspaper of its own would shortly arrive, named the New Stirling Star. The paper ran to area residents of Maybutt and Stirling for a short time, until eventually the paper disappeared over time as the area dwindled in population.

In 1980 Stirling and Maybutt also hosted the filming of Pure Escape starring James Garner.

== Notable residents ==
- Walter Gedrasik, of The Seaforth Highlanders of Canada and Irish Regiment of Canada, died in action on October 23, 1944, at the age of 18 years old. Son of Andrew and Marion Gedrasik, of Maybutt. He was awarded the 1939-1945 Star, Italy Star, as well as the Canadian Volunteer Service Medal with Clasp. His family received his Memorial Cross in his honour. His remains are buried at Cesena War Cemetery, in Cesena, Italy.

== See also ==
- List of attractions and landmarks in Stirling
- List of communities in Alberta
- List of ghost towns in Alberta
