= Alexo, Alberta =

Ghost town in Alberta, Canada

Coordinates: 52.474059°N 115.789885°W

Location of Alexo, Alberta

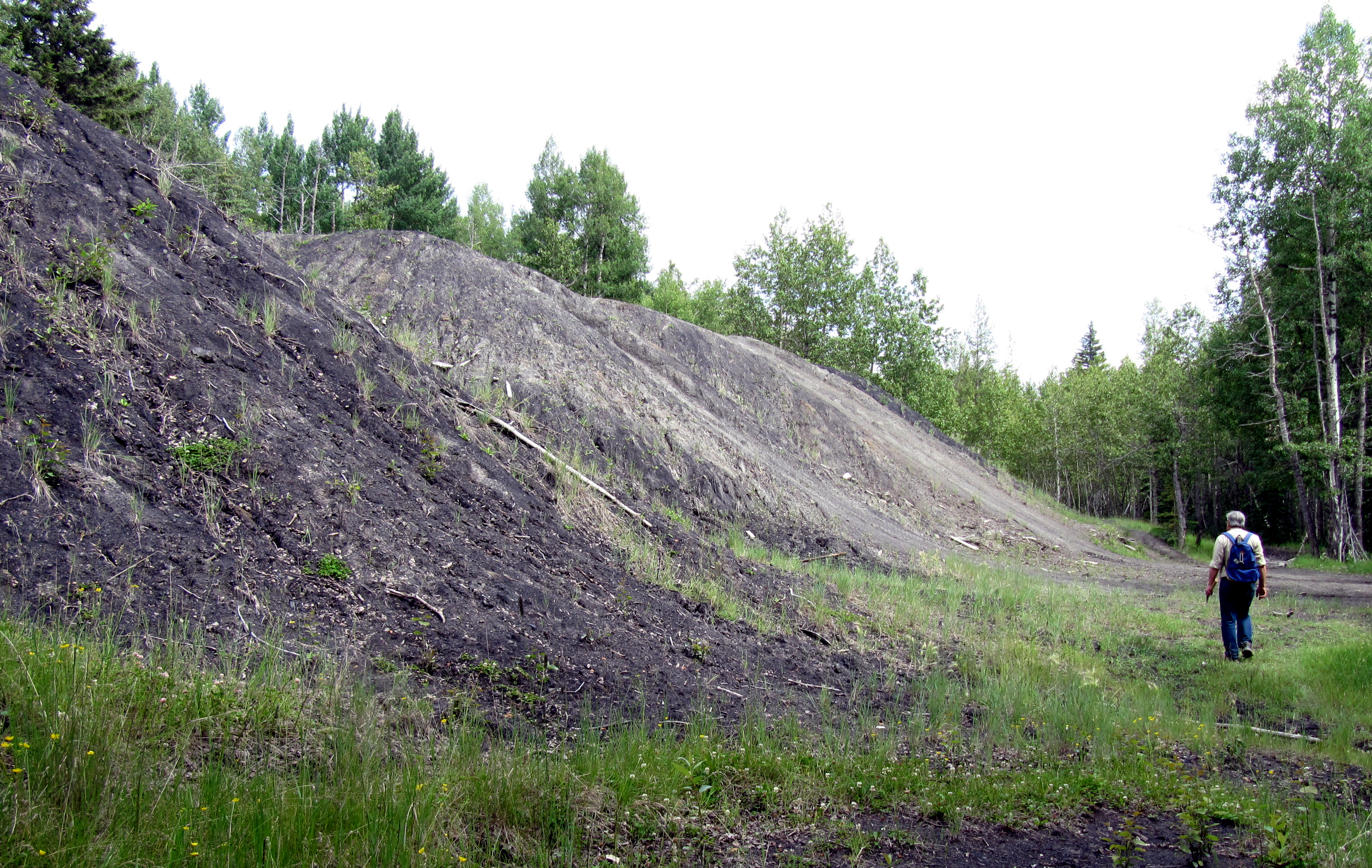
Coal waste piles at Alexo, Alberta.

Alexo is a ghost town in Alberta, Canada. Built as a coal mining town, it lies in the foothills of the Canadian Rockies at an elevation of about 1,260 metres (4,130 ft), near the David Thompson Highway between the towns of Nordegg and Rocky Mountain House. In 1984, the Townsite of Alexo was transformed into a summer camp by YouthHQ which operates out of Red Deer, Alberta. Shunda Creek and the North Saskatchewan River run to the south of it.

== History ==
Access to the Alexo area was poor prior to 1913 when the Brazeau Branch rail line (part of the Canadian Northern Railway which later became part of the Canadian National Railway) to the coal mine at Nordegg was opened. This created access to coal markets, and other mining ventures soon started near the tracks. The mine at Alexo, which was named after the Alexo Coal Company, was one of them, as were the mines at Saunders Creek and Harlech.

The Alexo mine began operation in 1920, and by 1948 annual production was about 33,000 tonnes. The payroll included about 70 people, of whom 30 were miners. There was a hotel, a cookhouse, a bunkhouse, a store, and 30 cottages.

The coal in the Alexo area is part of the early Paleocene Coalspur Formation and is of high-volatile "C" bituminous rank. The mine worked a single seam that was consistently about 5 feet (1.5m) thick, with a shallow dip to the northeast. Mining was done by underground room and pillar methods. By 1948 the main slope had advanced to a length of 824 metres (2,700 ft), and levels driven from both sides covered a total east-west distance of 2,012 metres (6,600 ft). The average heat content of the Alexo product was 11,633 British Thermal Units per pound.

The Alexo mine closed in 1955 due to declining markets for steam coal as the railroads replaced steam locomotives with diesel, and the town was dismantled. Total coal production had been 764,600 tonnes.

Currently, most of the former Alexo townsite is leased by the Provincial government to Youth HQ (formally the Youth and Volunteer Centre) of Red Deer, Alberta and is home to a summer camp called Camp Alexo. Though much of the town was dismantled, lots of history still exists on the town site. This includes a cemetery, which is still maintained by Camp Alexo, some out buildings, the tennis courts, and the old train tracks still exist within the camp and on its boundaries.
