= Rowley, Alberta =

Rowley
- Hamlet
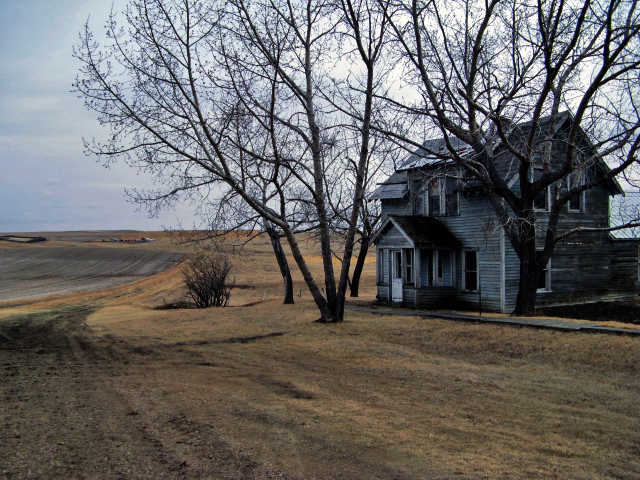
- One of the homes undergoing restoration

- Location of Rowley in Alberta
- Coordinates: 51°45′44″N 112°47′18″W
- Country: Canada
- Province: Alberta
- Region: Southern Alberta
- Census division: 2
- Municipal district: Starland County
- Founded: 1910
- Incorporated: 1912

Government
  - Governing body: Division 4: Jacqueline Watts
- Elevation: 650 m (2,130 ft)

Population (2013)
  - Total: 8
- Time zone: UTC−06:00 (Alberta Time)
- Postal code span: T0J 2X0
- Area code: +1-403
- Highways: Highway 56 Highway 839
- Website: www.rowleyalberta.ca

Rowley is a hamlet In Alberta, Canada within Starland County. It is located just north of Drumheller.

== History ==
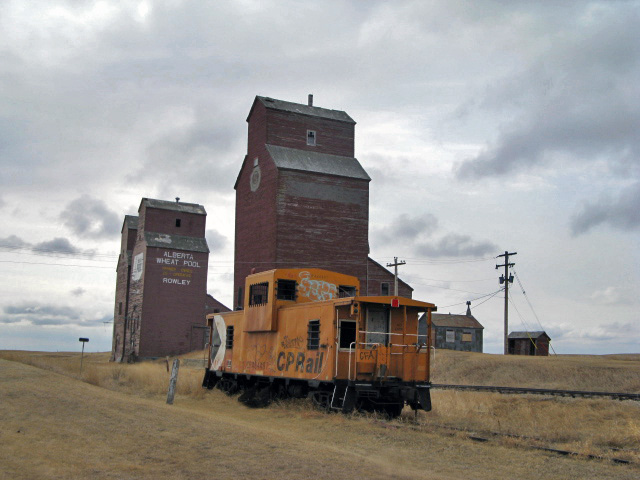
Grain elevators prior to restoration

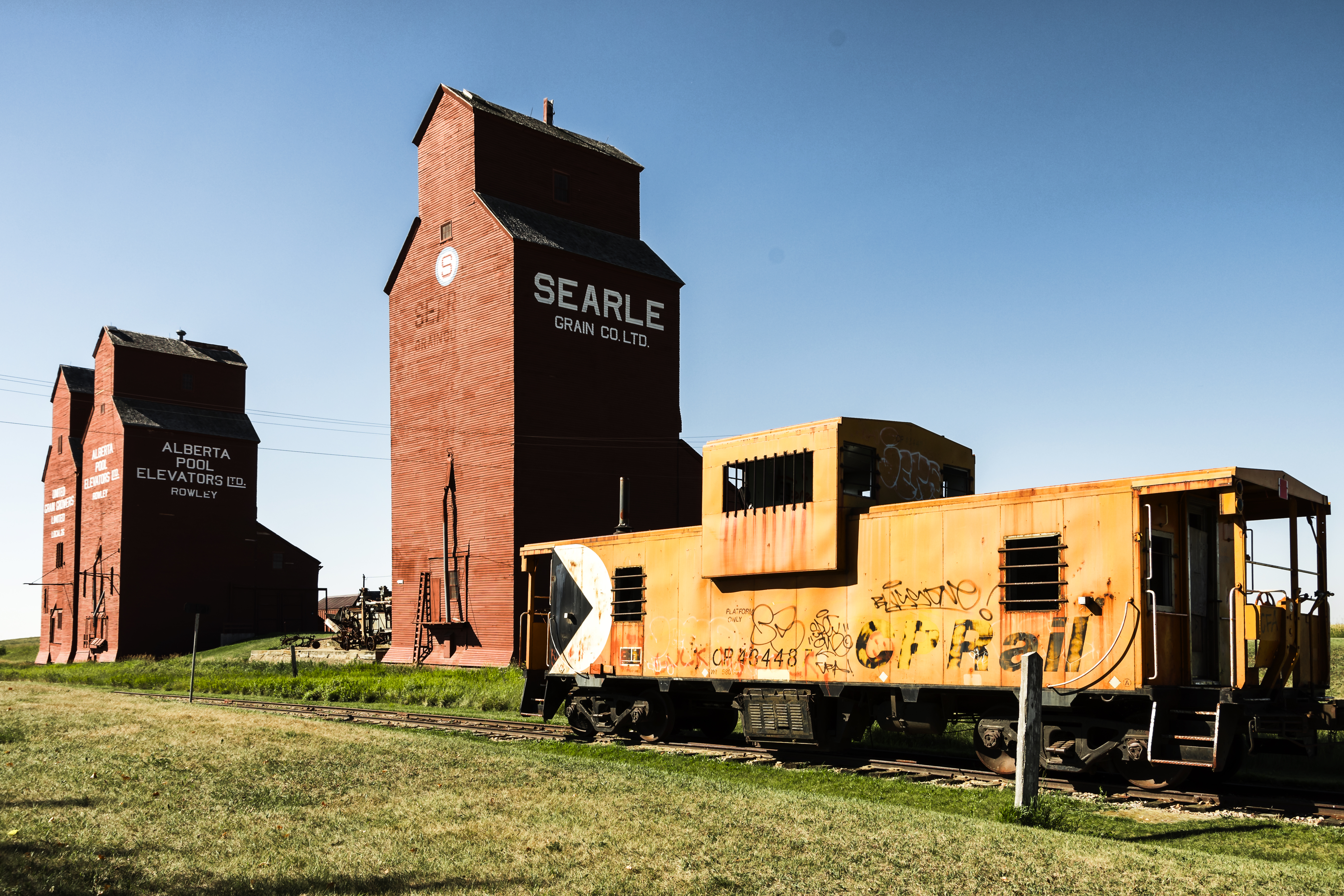

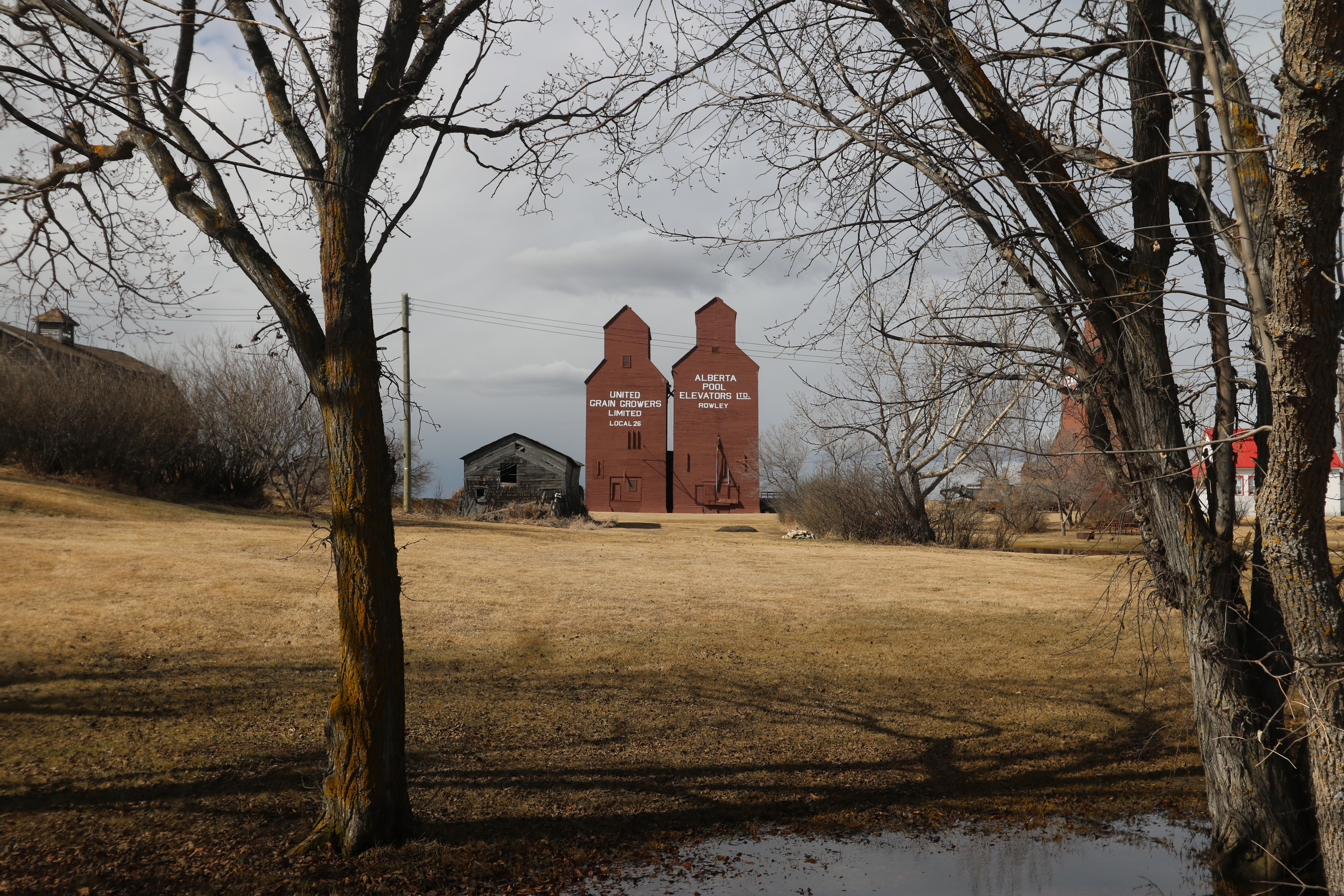

Less than a year before the new millennium, the last train passed through Rowley. In the mid-1970s, Rowley, which had once boasted a population of about 500 in the 1920s, was a beat-up dying community, with rows of empty houses and businesses, and inhabited by only a few dozen prairie-hardened souls. But one night, a few party-happy locals, whose liquor supply was fast dwindling, decided on a quick solution – a "B & E party" at a boarded-up old saloon. The bar was fixed up and named Sam's Saloon after one of the previous owners who had been a respected member of the community. The brazen men then got talking about sprucing up the pioneer community to make it a heritage stop for tourists.

For the next quarter century, locals restored old homes and businesses, and soon visitors were attracted from all parts of Alberta, Canada and the U.S. The highlight of the community's new fame came in 1988 when a cinema production team used Rowley as the set for the hit Canadian movie Bye Bye Blues.

In Rowley locals have spent thousands of dollars fixing up many of the old community's homes and buildings to reflect the community's pioneer days, there are still many others left abandoned, and offer ghost towners photo opportunities.

1999 also saw the regional train service through Rowley end and locals are worried about the community's future. "That's really going to hurt our cash flow", said one old-timer, noting that as many as 900 train tourists a week would get off at the Rowley station, which also serves as the community's museum. However, the community is still hoping word-of-mouth will keep tourists coming. Locals meet at the community hall year-round.

== Demographics ==
The population of Rowley according to the 2013 municipal census conducted by Starland County is 8.

== Media ==
Rowley was a shoot site for the films Legends of the Fall, The Magic of Ordinary Days, and Bye Bye Blues.

== See also ==
- List of communities in Alberta
- List of ghost towns in Alberta
- List of hamlets in Alberta
