= Evarts, Alberta =

Evarts
- Former village
- Location of Evarts Evarts (Alberta)
- Coordinates: 52°15′38″N 114°16′18″W
- Country: Canada
- Province: Alberta
- Region: Central Alberta
- Census division: No. 8
- Municipal district: Red Deer County
- Incorporated (village): May 9, 1906
- Dissolved: May 27, 1916
- Time zone: UTC−06:00 (Alberta Time)
- Area codes: 403 / 587

Evarts is a former unincorporated community in central Alberta, Canada within Red Deer County. It is located on Township Road 382 east of the Medicine River, approximately 5.3 km (3.3 mi) south of Benalto and 16.09 km (10.00 mi) southwest of Sylvan Lake.

== Toponymy ==
Evarts is named for Lucius Evarts (also recorded as Louis or Luther), who first established a permanent settlement at the site.

== History ==
=== Founding, village, and dissolution: 1900-1916 ===
Evarts was first settled in 1900 by Lucius and Listella Evarts, who established a homestead beside a ford in the Medicine Hat River. A community developed in the area that, by mid-1903, required a post office.

As residents disagreed on whether their settlement should be named Medicine Valley or Braton, Canada Post opted to name the post office after Lucius Evarts, who was responsible for communicating with them about establishing a post office. Nonetheless, early residents used the name Medicine Valley for several years after. Evarts School, also founded in 1903, operated under the name Medicine Valley until 1908. Around 1905, residents of the area established Medicine Valley Cemetery, later known as Diamond Valley Cemetery.

As Evarts continued to expand, residents expected the community would soon receive railway connections. Evarts incorporated as a village on May 9, 1906, and reportedly had a population of 280 in February 1907. Evarts Presbyterian Church opened that year. At its peak, the community contained a hotel (the Parker House Hotel), a school, and an array of businesses including a creamery, saloon, and blacksmith. The settlement received telephone services in 1911.

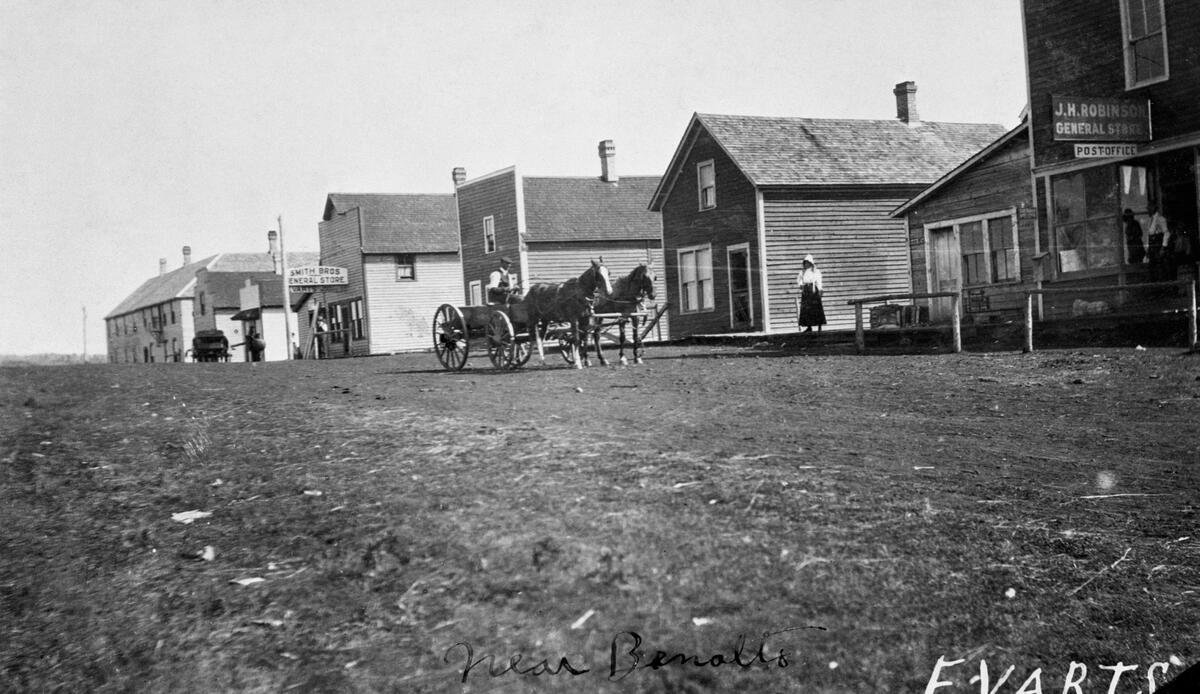
Main street of Evarts (1912).

Throughout its years as a village, Evarts often hosted political events or discussions. The United Farmers of Alberta often hosted debates in the Evarts. Provincial politician John Moore, who was running for a second term to represent Red Deer, visited Evarts in October 1908, though he was poorly received due to residents' frustration over not yet having received train services. Local media expressed that Moore was jeered at by residents of Evarts, and had "lost his prestige"; Moore was not re-elected the following year.

By 1914, it became apparent to settlers that the Canadian Pacific Railway had no intention of building through Evarts. Residents began to leave the area, relocating primarily to Benalto, Eckville, or other settlements along a railway line. Evarts subsequently dissolved from village status on May 27, 1916.

=== Post-dissolution: 1917-present ===
Owing to the fluctuating nature of Evarts' population afterwards, a succession of postmasters assumed responsibility for the settlement throughout the decades. Services continued at the church until its closure in 1961.

The Red Deer Public School District voted to close Evarts School in September 1959, despite protestations of the residents, and students were transported to nearby Benalto instead. According to Evarts School District's chairman, A. Staniforth, students learned their school had been shut when they arrived for school on Monday, September 21, and found the building closed. At this time, the school had 13 pupils. Evarts' post office closed permanently in June 1969.

According to one local history society, the federal government responded with incredulity to a man born in Evarts who applied for his pension in 1976 by submitting his birth certificate. Officials reportedly requested further information in order to verify that a community named Evarts had existed. Reflecting on Evarts' status in 1977, the society wrote that it would be "hard for [readers] to try to understand there was a lively, bustling village at Evarts" at one time.

As of 2026, the Evarts site contains a few residential properties, and some abandoned buildings from the former settlement.

== Places of interest ==
As of 2007, the former Evarts site is marked by a historical cairn bearing a commemorative plaque. Its inscription honours "the pioneers of Evarts and District who arrived between 1900 and 1925," and describes businesses that once operated in the area.

The nearby Diamond Valley Cemetery remains open to the public as of 2025.

== Demographics ==
Population history of Evarts
Year	Pop.	±%
1911	25	—
1916	26	+4.0%
Source: Statistics Canada

The Dominion Bureau of Statistics recorded Evarts' population as 25 in 1911 and 26 in 1916. According to Alberta Municipal Affairs, the Village of Evarts had a population of 18 in 1914 and 22 in 1915.

== Notable residents ==
- Myrtle Raivio (née Sands; 1914 – 1982) — one of the first women in Canada to work as a guide and outfitter in big game hunting; born in Evarts

== See also ==
- List of communities in Alberta
- List of former urban municipalities in Alberta
- List of ghost towns in Alberta
