= Georgetown, Alberta =

Georgetown is a ghost town in Alberta, Canada at the foot of Mount Rundle, near Banff.

== History ==
In 1901, the town of Anthracite's coal mining was falling into decline. Floods and further bad luck had plagued the mining operations since the Canadian Anthracite Coal Company closed its mine there in 1890. The Georgetown Coal Company chose to try again in the area around Banff, and opened a new coal mining seam at the foot of Mount Rundle. By 1912, the Bow Valley's newest coal mining community had begun operations.

Conditions at Georgetown were considered good in comparison with other coal-mining communities such as Anthracite. The local company store stocked all necessities, and anything not in stock could be ordered. However, the company had a monopoly over trade in the town: all miners were forced to purchase their groceries from the company store. Running water and electricity were provided in homes, but indoor toilets, considered to be luxuries, were not. Wages were still very low, at only $3 a day for miners.

However, when the First World War began in 1914, the Georgetown Coal Company's finances began to fall into disarray. Three years after the first mine workers moved in, the Georgetown mine closed. Before closing, the town was fully functional, serving as the home of approximately 200 people, as well as cottages, a community hall and a post office. When the mine closed, most miners moved to nearby Canmore, Crowsnest Pass or Drumheller. Today, the foundations of some of the old town's buildings can still be found. It is possible to visit the site during summer.
