= Tollerton, Alberta =

Tollerton
- Former village
- Location of Tollerton Tollerton (Alberta)
- Coordinates: 53°32′09″N 116°28′10″W
- Country: Canada
- Province: Alberta
- Planning region: Upper Athabasca
- Municipal district: Yellowhead County
- Incorporated (village): December 27, 1913
- Dissolved: January 26, 1918
- Time zone: UTC−06:00 (Alberta Time)
- Area code: 780 / 587

Tollerton is a former village in central Alberta, Canada within Yellowhead County. It was located on the former Canadian Northern Railway along the north shore of the McLeod River, approximately 6.0 km (3.7 mi) southwest of the Town of Edson.

== History ==
Tollerton was established as a division point along the Canadian Northern Railway. Its rail facilities included a train station, a timber water tank, an ice house, a bunk house, a steam-heated engine house, and three rail sidings with capacity to hold 249 cars.

The community incorporated as the Village of Tollerton on December 27, 1913. In 1917, a decision was made to close the Canadian Northern Railway line in favour of the Grand Trunk Pacific Railway through Edson to the north, resulting in the demise of Tollerton. Subsequently, the community dissolved from village status on January 26, 1918.

== Demographics ==
Population history of Tollerton
Year	Pop.	±%
1916	49	—
Source: Statistics Canada

In the 1916 Census of Prairie Provinces, Tollerton had a population of 49, although Alberta Municipal Affairs indicated that it had a population of 180 in the same year.

== See also ==
- List of communities in Alberta
- List of former urban municipalities in Alberta
- List of ghost towns in Alberta
