= Harrisville, Alberta =

Harrisville
- Rural area
- Location of Harrisville in Alberta
- Coordinates: 49°09′33″N 113°38′29″W
- Country: Canada
- Province: Alberta
- Region: Southern Alberta
- Census division: 2
- Municipal district: Cardston County
- Founded: 1901

Government
  - Governing body: Cardston County Council
  - MP: Jim Hillyer
  - MLA: Gary Bikman
- Time zone: UTC-7 (MST)
- Postal code span: List of T Postal Codes of Canada
- Area code: +1-403

Harrisville was a community in Cardston County, Alberta, Canada, to the southwest of Cardston. It had a school district and a Roman Catholic church – the first in the southern part of Alberta – which blew down in 1906. The school closed in 1948.

== St. Stephen's Church ==
St. Stephen's Church in Harrisville was the first Catholic church in the southernmost part of Alberta. It was built in 1899 or 1901 and blew down in 1906. It was rebuilt on a different site in 1907. In 1965 the church was closed. On September 18, 1989, it was listed in the Alberta Register of Historic Places.

== See also ==
- List of communities in Alberta
