= Mitford, Alberta =

Ghost town in Alberta, Canada

Coordinates: 51°12′51″N 114°33′03″W

Mitford is a ghost town in Alberta. Established in 1886, Mitford supported a sawmill, and later a coal mine, before being abandoned by 1898.

== History ==
In 1885, T.B.H. Cochrane and his wife Adela exchanged their lease of 55,000 acres (223 km^{2}; 86 sq mi) near High River for one just west of present-day Cochrane, Alberta. The next year, Cochrane associated himself with the Calgary Lumber Company and built a sawmill three miles west of present-day Cochrane, handling the vast amount of lumber on his lease. Although the Canadian Pacific Railway approached the mill from the east, tension built between Cochrane and the railway, as the railway did not like stopping at the mill due to the steep grades nearby. By 1888 the town contained an office, drug store and bunkhouses. By 1891 it had a school as well, meeting in the saloon. It was named for a friend of Cochrane's wife.

However, the success of the sawmill was limited. Most of the good quality fir to be found in the area was never sold, instead ironically being used to construct a railway designed to transport the lumber to market. In 1888, a coal mine began operation in the area, with the distinct advantage of having the sawmill's railway nearby to transport the coal to market. In 1890, it became obvious that both operations were doomed to fail, closing the same year. In an effort to save the town, T.B.H. Cochrane established a brickyard using material found just north of Mitford. In 1893, that operation was also closed, due to the inferior quality of its product. After the closing of the brickyard, the town fell into decline, before it was abandoned in 1898. Before its desertion, Mitford housed a store, a school, a hotel, a restaurant, a medical practice, and an Anglican church. The steam engine used on Mitford's railway was sold to a British Columbia mill, and the Canadian Pacific Railway ceased making regular stops at the town.

== Today ==
In 1898 a fire started in the Chinese restaurant, destroying most of the town. In 1899, the town's church was moved to Cochrane, and today all that remains is the town's cemetery, which currently stands on private property.
