= Tail Creek Town =

- Ghost town
- Flag

- Tail Creek
- Coordinates: 52°17′45.91″N 113°3′11.93″W
- Founded: c. 1870
- Destroyed by fire: 1878

Tail Creek Town was a Metis community that existed from circa 1870 to 1878.

The community was founded by Métis who fled Manitoba around the late 1860s. It was composed of roughly 400 one-room log cabins laid out in a haphazard fashion. From early autumn to late spring the town hosted close to 1,000 people. For a time, it was the largest community between St. Boniface and the Pacific.

The community was built in and around the Y where Tail Creek (a tributary of Buffalo Lake) joins the Red Deer River, east of Red Deer, Alberta.

The community met and welcomed the Royal Canadian Mounted Police in January 1875, including Sam Steele, who later placed a four-man detachment in the community.

The community was wiped out by a prairie fire in 1878. It was not rebuilt, due to the extermination of the buffalo herds.

One cabin is said to have survived and is preserved in Stettler. The cemetery still exists.

== Resources ==
- Clark, Edith J. Lawrence (1968). Trails of Tail Creek Country. 416.
