= Flowerdale, Alberta =

Flowerdale
- Unincorporated community
- Location of Flowerdale in Alberta
- Coordinates: 51.366°N 111.565°W
- Country: Canada
- Province: Alberta
- Census division: No. 4
- Special Area: No. 2

Government
  - Type: Unincorporated
  - Governing body: Special Areas Board
- Time zone: UTC−06:00 (Alberta Time)

Flowerdale is a former locality in southern Alberta, Canada within Special Area No. 2. Once an agrarian town and the seat of a rural municipal government, Flowerdale was abandoned in the 1930s. Some stone ruins remain from the original settlement.

The site is located approximately 24 kilometres (15 mi) southwest of the Village of Youngstown and 113 kilometres (70 mi) north of the City of Brooks.

== Toponymy ==
Flowerdale was named by resident Annie Twelvetree, due to the number of wild flowers growing in nearby fields and along the banks of Berry Creek.

== History ==
=== Early history and settlement ===
Between 1857 and 1860, an expedition assessed whether land containing Flowerdale had agricultural potential. The investigation, led by John Palliser, ultimately advised against settling in the semi-arid region today known as Palliser's Triangle. Even so, Canada's expansionist government acquired the lands now known as the Prairies, and offered settlers free land for use as farms and homesteads. Thousands of primarily European settlers moved to the Triangle between 1870 and 1930.

=== Establishment of Flowerdale: 1900–1911 ===
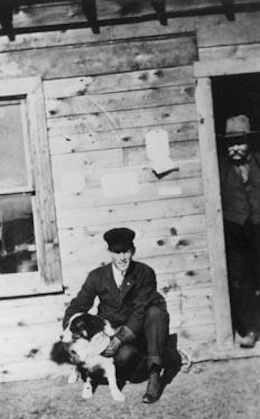
A. R. Stewart inside his store, and resident Fred Schofield; 1911.

Flowerdale was one of several farming communities along Berry Creek that were, between 1909 and 1917, connected by a stagecoach service that transported mail and passengers. Settlement had begun in the area in the first decade of the 20th century.

A post office opened for the settlement, bearing the name Flowerdale, in May 1911. Arthur Stewart Sr., its first postmaster, also operated a general store, which received stock transported by wagon from the nearby settlement of Bassano. One resident, Louis O'Reilly, would recall Stewart's store being "the first store in that part of the country," and people would travel for miles to purchase "everything from a can of beans to a marriage license." Stewart and his family constructed a stone house soon after arriving, which may be the ruins visible at the site today.

A Flowerdale school also opened in 1911, serving children from surrounding localities.

=== Becoming a seat of governance and decline: 1912–1930 ===
Flowerdale became the seat of a rural municipality (Flowerdale, No. 244) in December 1913. Early representatives were selected from Flowerdale as well as surrounding localities of Baraca, Stoppington, and Flaxland. Like Flowerdale, none of these localities survived into the 21st century. Councillors held meetings at Silver Leaf School, a central location for the represented localities.

Unpredictable weather undermined Flowerdale's early agrarian economy. Residents Armitage Wallbank and Louis Schumacher would later recall strong yields in 1915 and 1916, with 1916 in particular offering a yield "that was talked about for years." Flowerdale recorded 575 resident farmers in 1916. Its post office closed at the end of that year.

The inconsistency of successive yields throughout the 1910s and 1920s both attracted residents to Flowerdale, and drove people away from it in search of better economic conditions. Flowerdale and surrounding areas were frequently afflicted by grass fires, drought, and flooding. A difficult winter in 1919 hampered the ability of pastoral farmers to feed their livestock, leading to widespread animal deaths. The Flowerdale municipality sought bank loans to pay for seed or animal feed, but was denied due to the poor credit of "some one hundred or more" farmers in the district.

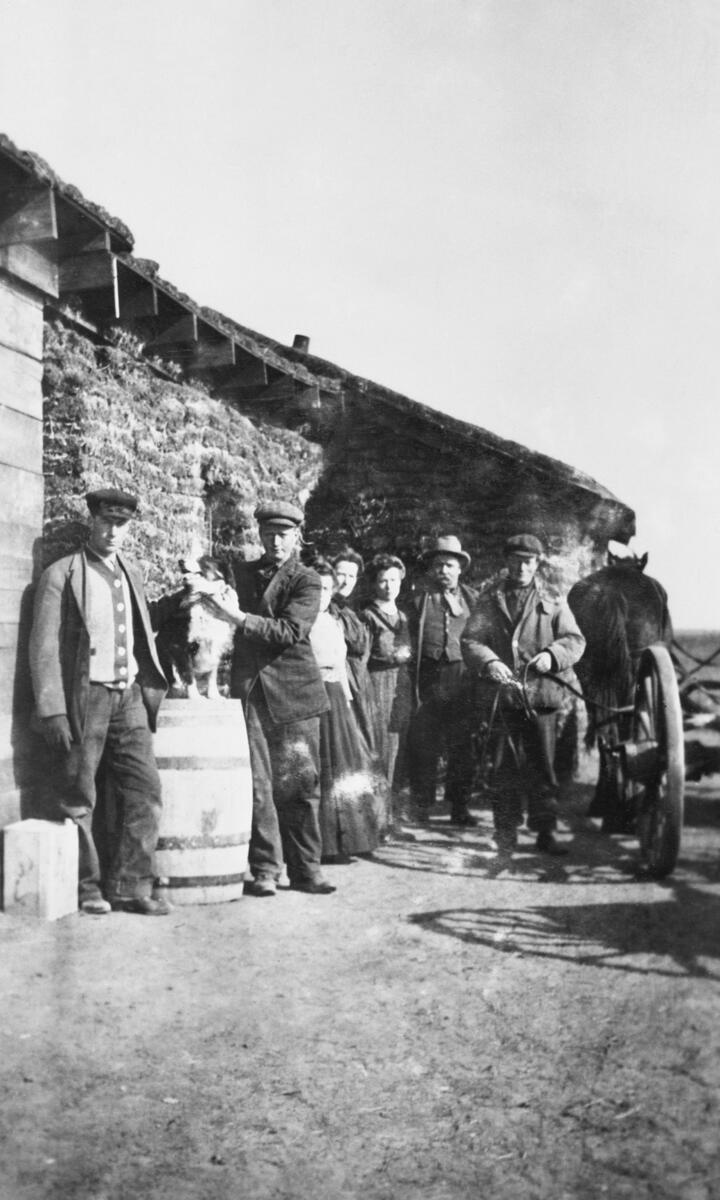
Flowerdale residents and sod house, c. 1910.

Over Flowerdale's operational years, several bridges installed to facilitate crossing Berry Creek were washed away by floods or destroyed by cold weather. Flowerdale's residents notably petitioned the provincial government to install a replacement bridge in 1913, and received one the next year; this bridge was destroyed in 1918. By 1923, the Flowerdale council's financial position was strained enough that it formally requested free lumber from the province to replace the structure. Flowerdale's final replacement bridge was destroyed by a prairie fire in March 1929; this time, it was not replaced.

Flowerdale's population had declined to 325 permanent farmers by 1921, the last year for which the Ministry of Municipal Affairs collected independent data for the settlement. From 1924 onwards, data was collected for the Flowerdale municipal district in its entirety; the district recorded a total population of 925 that year. Records from 1931, Flowerdale's last appearance as a census centre, provided that the district contained an estimated 625 residents, of which 150 were permanent farmers.

In 1931, the Flowerdale municipality went bankrupt.

== Abandonment ==
As a result of its bankruptcy, Flowerdale's council voted in December 1931 to amalgamate with neighbouring districts. They asked to be placed under a special administrator appointed by the Minister of Municipal Affairs. By this time, most residents had abandoned Flowerdale, and the majority of the deserted lands had been liable to forfeiture due to unpaid taxes. Indeed, at the time of its bankruptcy, the district had owed $108,239 ($2,167,420 in constant dollars) in unpaid taxes.

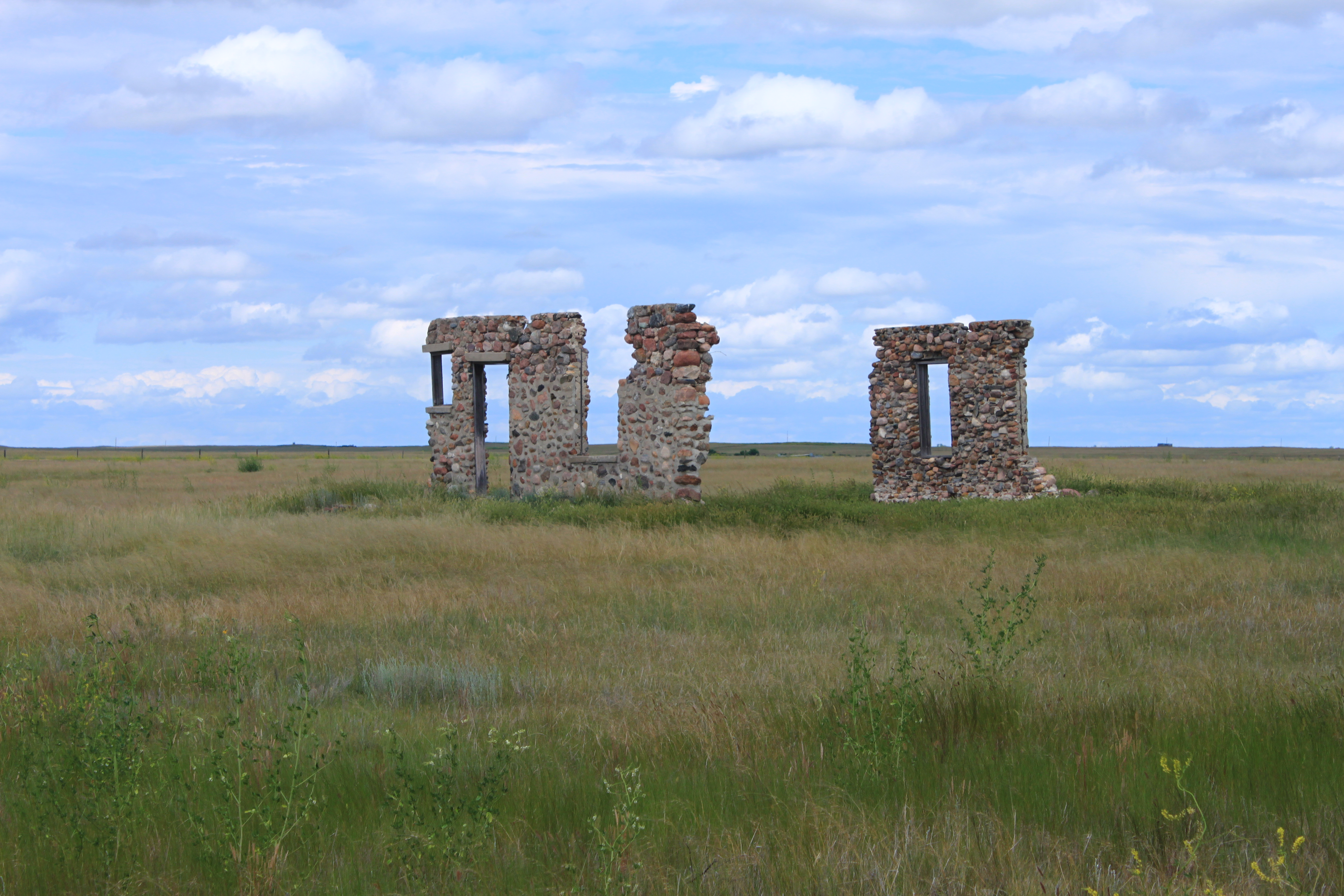
Flowerdale's last remaining structure; ruins photographed in 2011. Likely the remains of A. R. Stewart's home.

In 1932, these areas, as well as others along Berry Creek, were placed under the control of a board convened by An Act respecting the Berry Creek Area. Many other localities along Berry Creek and across the Palliser's Triangle fell into ruin throughout the 1930s, owing to the Dust Bowl and Great Depression. The ruination of these communities led to the establishment of the Special Areas Board, which assisted farmers in relocating. The Board later allowed new farms to be established under strict land-use conditions.

Flowerdale, however, was left to be reclaimed by nature. All that remains of the settlement in the 21st century are the ruins of a stone building. According to local histories, these are the remains of a building maintained by A. R. Stewart, Flowerdale's first postmaster and shopkeeper.

== See also ==
- List of communities in Alberta
