= Wrentham, Alberta =

Wrentham
- Hamlet
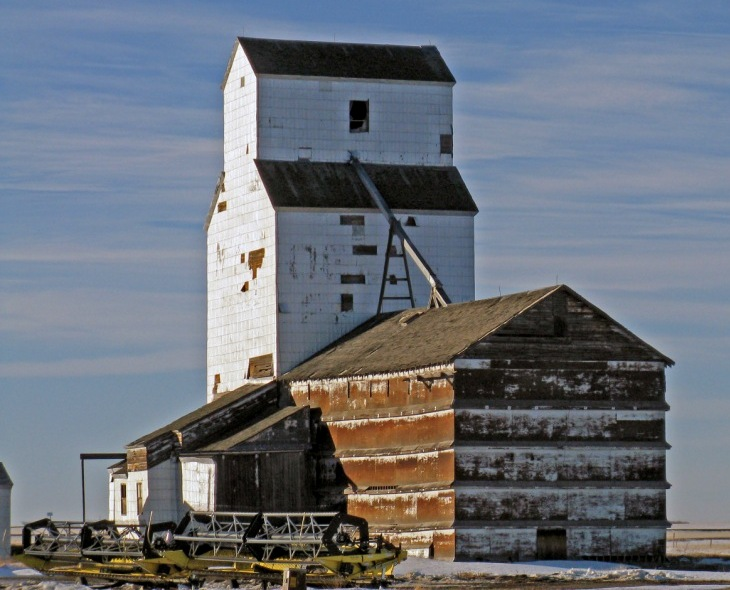
- Grain elevator in Wrentham
- Motto: Come Enjoy Wrentham
- Location of Wrentham in Alberta
- Coordinates: 49°30′52″N 112°10′22″W
- Country: Canada
- Province: Alberta
- Region: Southern Alberta
- Census division: 2
- Municipal district: County of Warner No. 5
- Founded: 1910
- Incorporated: 1913

Government
  - Type: Unincorporated
  - Governing body: County of Warner No. 5 Council
- Elevation: 946 m (3,104 ft)

Population (1991)
  - Total: 58
- Time zone: UTC−06:00 (Alberta Time)
- Postal code span: T0K 2P0
- Area code: +1-403
- Highways: Highway 61
- Waterways: Chin Reservoir

Wrentham (/ˈrɛntəm/) is a hamlet in southern Alberta, Canada within the County of Warner No. 5. It is located southeast of the intersection of the Veteran Memorial Highway (Highway 36) and the historic Red Coat Trail (Highway 61), approximately 25 kilometres (16 mi) east of the Village of Stirling, 30 kilometres (19 mi) south of the Town of Taber and 55 kilometres (34 mi) west of the Village of Foremost.

The hamlet was named by the Canadian Pacific Railway after Wrentham, a village in Suffolk, England.

The hamlet is in Census Division No. 2 and in the federal riding of Medicine Hat—Cardston—Warner.

== Demographics ==
Population history of Wrentham
Year	Pop.	±%
1941	74	—
1951	73	−1.4%
1956	74	+1.4%
1961	111	+50.0%
1966	99	−10.8%
1971	75	−24.2%
1976	68	−9.3%
1981	60	−11.8%
1986	64	+6.7%
1991	58	−9.4%
Source: Statistics Canada

Wrentham recorded a population of 58 in the 1991 Census of Population conducted by Statistics Canada.

== See also ==
- List of communities in Alberta
- List of hamlets in Alberta
