= Anthracite, Alberta =

Anthracite
- Locality
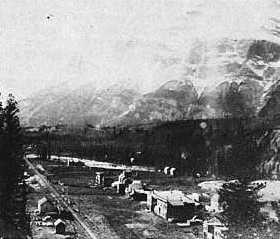
- The mine site (foreground) and the townsite (background left) of Anthracite in 1895

- Location within Alberta
- Coordinates: 51°11′33″N 115°29′38″W
- Country: Canada
- Province: Alberta
- Improvement district: ID No. 9 (Banff)

Government
  - Type: Unincorporated
- Time zone: UTC−06:00 (Alberta Time)
- Area codes: 403, 587, 825

Anthracite was a locality located within Banff National Park in southern Alberta, Canada. The name was retained into the 21st century by the Government of Alberta for mapping purposes.

== Toponymy ==
Anthracite was named for the eponymous variety of coal that was mined in the area.

== History ==
=== Canadian Anthracite Company management: 1883–1891 ===
Coal was first found by locals of the Banff area in Anthracite in 1883. In 1885, McLeod Stewart and his brother Archibald, along with business associates, formed the Canadian Anthracite Company and purchased land that would become Anthracite and its mine. Mining began in 1886, and the Canadian Pacific Railway (CPR) established a railway station that year to serve the operation.

The settlement reached 300 residents within a year, primarily comprising miners from the United States. A post office, church, and schoolhouse were established to provide for the growing community, alongside two hotels and several stores.

The influx of workers also generated demand for brothels and alcohol, even though Alberta, then part of the North-West Territories, would be subject to strict liquor bans until 1891. In July 1887, the local Justice of the Peace fined Blanche Maloney, owner of the most popular brothel in Anthracite, the then-extraordinary amount of $200 for liquor sale violations.

Demand for coal began to fall early in Anthracite's existence. The CPR also resisted relying on the mine for its supplies, as mines at Lethbridge sold better-quality coal for cheaper prices. In 1890, the Canadian Anthracite Company ended its operation of the mine. American lawyer and entrepreneur Hobart W. McNeill purchased a contract to manage the mine the next year.

=== McNeill family management and closure: 1891–1905 ===
Under McNeill's management, Anthracite's coal production peaked in 1893 at 100,000 tons. The establishment of a permanent North-West Mounted Police barracks near Anthracite that year also reduced crime and antisocial behaviour in the area. In 1897, McNeill described Anthracite in a letter to Archibald Stewart: "A camp of miners, of all nationalities, is not calculated to be free from broils and disturbances in any County. By [the NWMP's] help our camps have been orderly, life and property have been safe, and both Canmore and Anthracite are pleasant places to live in, so far as law and order are concerned".

Nonetheless, McNeill's operation was plagued by two significant floods from the Cascade River in 1894 and 1897. The first flood inflicted damage upon bridges and buildings; the second flood destroyed residential properties and drowned all horses and mules that had been put to work underground. McNeill died suddenly in 1900, and his brother, Wilbur McNeill, assumed control of the operation.

In January 1903, Ernest Cashel, an outlaw who had escaped custody the previous year, began lodging at Anthracite's boarding house. He was recognized by W. L. Macdonald, the station manager of Anthracite's railway station. Cashel was arrested on January 24 after Macdonald called the police.

Over the rest of 1903, Anthracite's mine produced just 5,185 tons of coal. The area also experienced a significant forest fire that year. By the time Wilbur McNeill closed the mine in 1904, Anthracite's population had fallen below 100 residents. McNeill relocated the operation to Canmore; many of Anthracite's residents followed, and Anthracite's post office closed permanently in March 1905.

=== Clearing of the townsite and end of mining: 1906–1973 ===
Following the 1910 completion of a public road between Calgary and Banff, visitors approaching Banff via either road or rail were forced to pass Anthracite's abandoned and dilapidated buildings. The 1911 Canadian census would record Anthracite's population as 25. The town's decline prompted efforts by the federal government and Dominion Parks to demolish what remained of Anthracite, though efforts were delayed by the number of squatters that had moved into empty properties in the area. The church, schoolhouse, and boarding-house were demolished by 1914, and in 1915, the Chief Superintendent of Dominion Parks at Edmonton reported that only two houses and one log store remained of the original locality.

Although Anthracite would never revive after becoming a ghost town, coal mining periodically continued in the area. Frank Wheatley and Sons opened a new mine in 1928 that operated steadily until a flood forced its closure in 1944. Their operation resumed in 1946 after they acquired more coal-bearing land, but the mine closed in 1953 after demand for coal declined in Banff. The 1950s also saw the beginning of the federal government's efforts to eliminate private ownership within Banff National Park.

Parks Canada housed employees in Anthracite in the 1960s, including cemetery supervisor John Pearson. In 1965, an elderly woman visiting the area informed Pearson of an apparent local legend, which provided that a five-year-old girl had drowned in a river near Anthracite in 1883. The girl had allegedly been buried in an unmarked grave beneath a fir tree, behind a house that had once stood across the street from the site of Pearson's lodgings.

Pearson and his family left the area in 1972, earning the distinction of being Anthracite's last residents. After departing, Pearson jokingly referred to himself as "the last mayor of Anthracite." By 1973, all formerly private lands that had constituted Anthracite were returned to Crown ownership, thus ending the use of the original Anthracite site.

=== Later developments and 21st century: 1974–present ===
In 1997, Pearson informed Banff-based journalist Johnnie Bachusky of the story he had heard earlier about the drowned child. Pearson, who had retained an interest in Anthracite's history after moving to Banff in 1972, chose to publicize the story due to the apparent gravesite's worsening state of disrepair.

Parks Canada subsequently sent a team of archaeologists to investigate, who concluded that the mound was a "probable gravesite." They marked the location with a plaque the following year, asking visitors to leave the site undisturbed. Their investigation also identified a site of up to 12 possible graves, believed to be Anthracite's cemetery.

As of the 21st century, little remains of Anthracite except for some wooden and concrete foundations from earlier buildings. The plaque is the only marker that confirms a settlement once stood in the area.

Population history of Anthracite
Year	Pop.	±%
1911	25	—
Source: Statistics Canada

== Population ==
Alberta Culture provides that Anthracite's permanent population peaked at 300 residents shortly after the Canadian Anthracite Company began operating in the area. A 1926 article in the Calgary Herald estimated that, at its height, Anthracite contained 1,500 residents. Journalist and researcher Johnnie Bachusky places Anthracite's peak population at around 1,000 residents.
