= Forty Mile Rail =

Overview
- Headquarters: Foremost, Alberta
- Reporting mark: FMR
- Locale: Southern Alberta, Canada
- Dates of operation: 2016–Present
- Predecessor: Canadian Pacific Railway

Technical
- Track gauge: 4 ft 8 1/2 in (1,435 mm) standard gauge
- Length: 46.80 miles (75.32 km)

Other
- Website: fortymilerail.com

Forty Mile Rail is a short line railway located in Southern Alberta running on the former CP Stirling Subdivision, with its headquarters located in the community of Foremost, Alberta. The rail came to Foremost originally in 1913 and was brought back into working order in 2016. There is track running from Foremost, west to Stirling, Alberta with a couple private elevators remaining on the line. The existing track was rehabilitated prior to 2000 and the last year there was any movement on the line was in 2006 – the last year it was operational until taken over from CP. On 21 September 2016, Forty Mile Rail took delivery of their first locomotive, EMD GP9 JLCX #4004, being leased from J&L Consulting.

The Primary market for Forty Mile Rail's services is expected to be grain and pulse production. Future potential may include oil movement and other non-grain products.

== See also ==
- List of Canadian railways
- Rail transport in Canada
