= Mount Indefatigable =

Mountain in Alberta, Canada

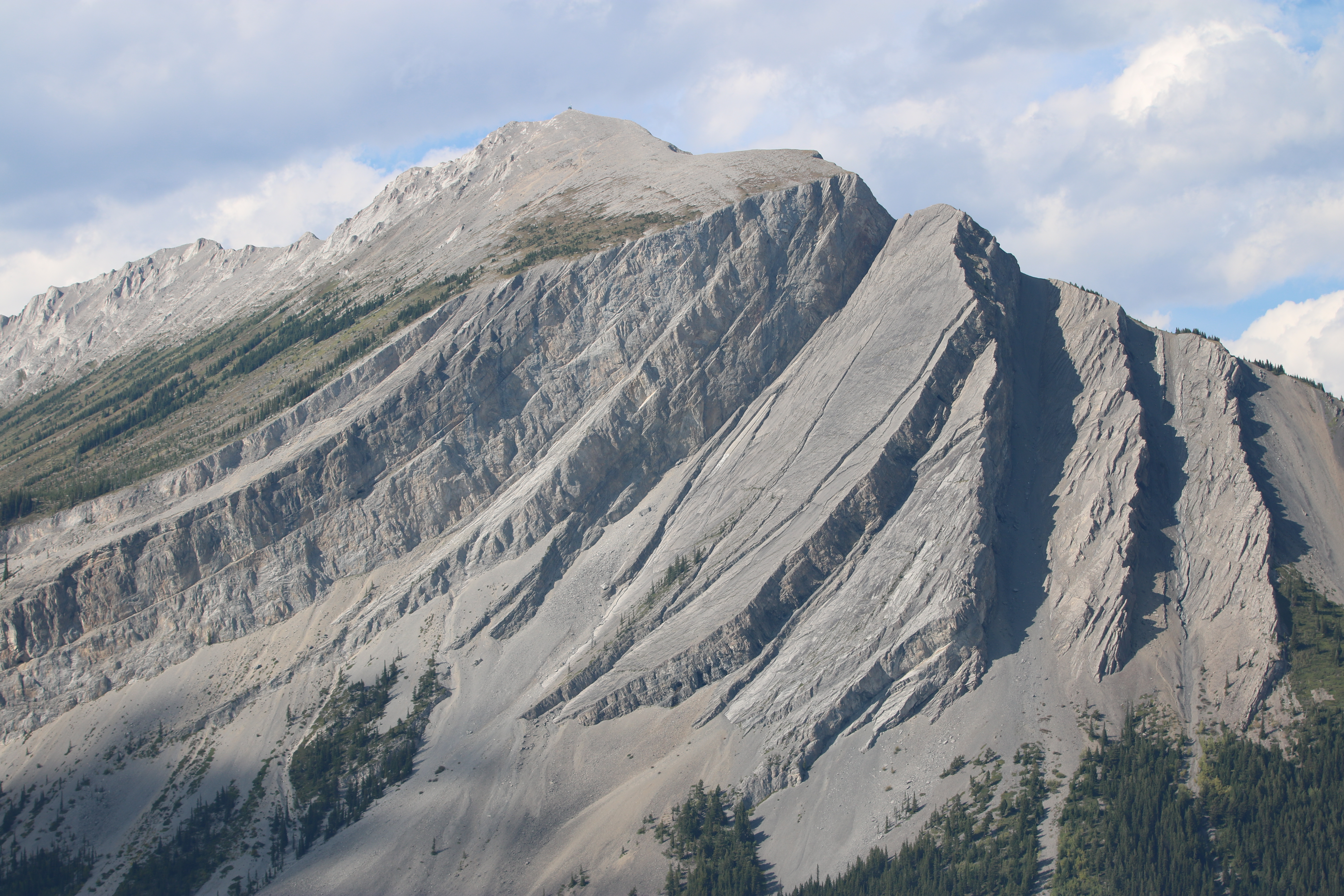
- The southern aspect of Mount Indefatigable

Highest point
- Elevation: 2,670 m (8,760 ft)
- Prominence: 198 m (650 ft)
- Parent peak: Mount Invincible (2700 m)
- Listing: Mountains of Alberta
- Coordinates: 50°39′12″N 115°10′19″W

Geography
- Location within Alberta Location within Canada
- Interactive map of Mount Indefatigable
- Country: Canada
- Province: Alberta
- Parent range: Spray Mountains; Canadian Rockies
- Topo map: NTS 82J11 Kananaskis Lakes

Climbing
- First ascent: 1901 by Walter D. Wilcox
- Easiest route: Climbing is discouraged: Hike to South Peak; Moderate Scramble to North Peak

Mount Indefatigable is a 2,670-metre (8,760-foot) mountain summit located in Peter Lougheed Provincial Park in the Canadian Rockies of Alberta, Canada. The peak is visible from Alberta Highway 40, and the Kananaskis Lakes area. Mount Indefatigable's nearest higher neighbour is Mount Invincible, 1.8 km (1.1 mi) to the northwest.

Like so many of the mountains in Kananaskis Country, Mount Indefatigable received its name from the persons and ships involved in the 1916 Battle of Jutland, the only major sea battle of the First World War.

== History ==
Mount Indefatigable was named in 1917 for HMS Indefatigable, a British battlecruiser that sank during the Battle of Jutland in World War I. The mountain's toponym was officially adopted in 1922 by the Geographical Names Board of Canada.

The first ascent of the peak was made in 1901 by Walter D. Wilcox.

In 2005, the popular trail to the summit of Mount Indefatigable was decommissioned to protect prime grizzly bear habitat. Though the unmaintained trail still exists, travel is discouraged by Alberta Parks.

== Geology ==
Mount Indefatigable is composed of sedimentary rock laid down during the Precambrian to Jurassic periods. Formed in shallow seas, this sedimentary rock was pushed east and over the top of younger rock during the Laramide orogeny.

== Climate ==
Based on the Köppen climate classification, Mount Indefatigable is located in a subarctic climate zone with cold, snowy winters, and mild summers. Winter temperatures can drop below −20 °C with wind chill factors below −30 °C. Precipitation runoff from the mountain drains east into the Kananaskis River, thence into the Bow River.

== Gallery ==
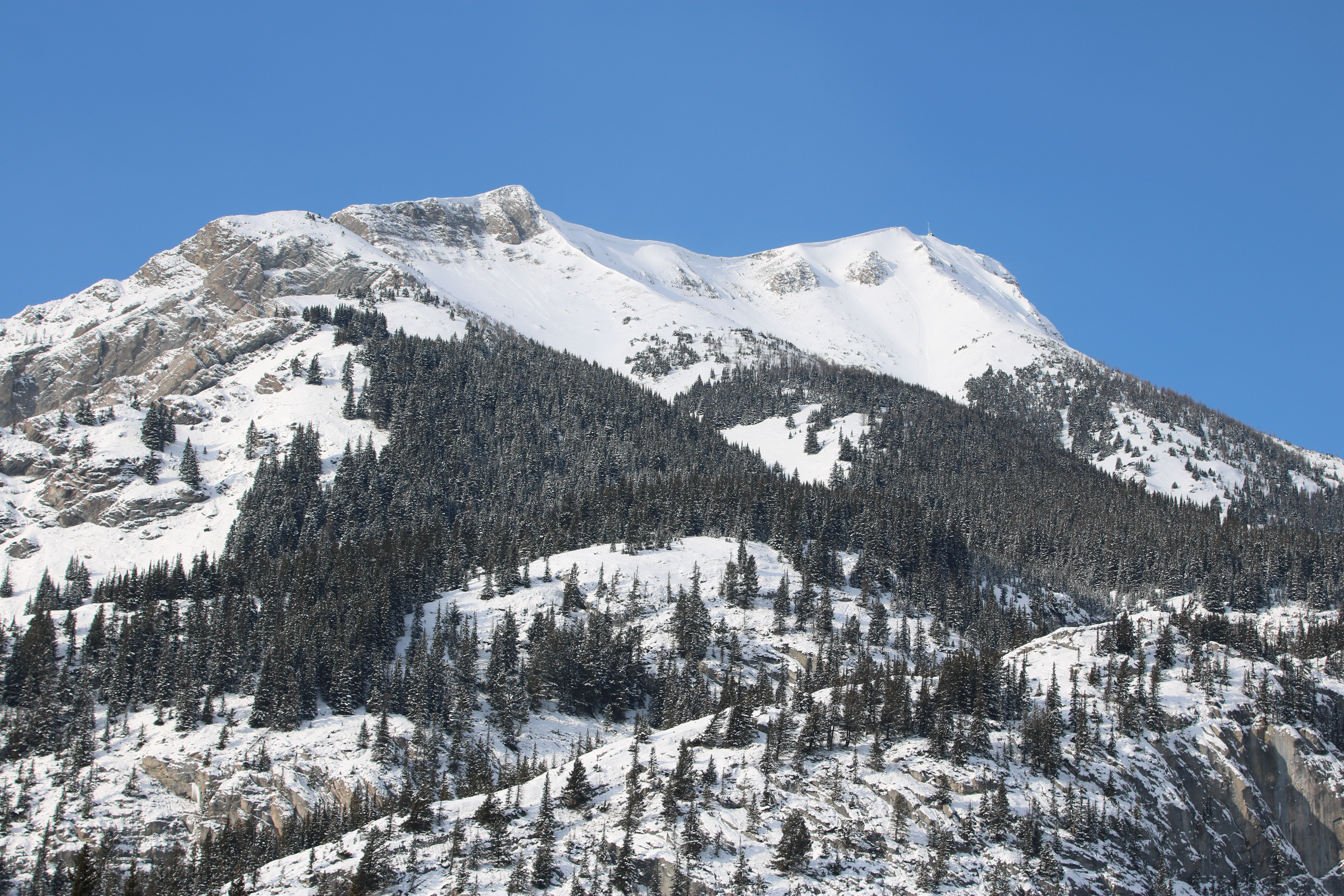
Mount Indefatigable in winter

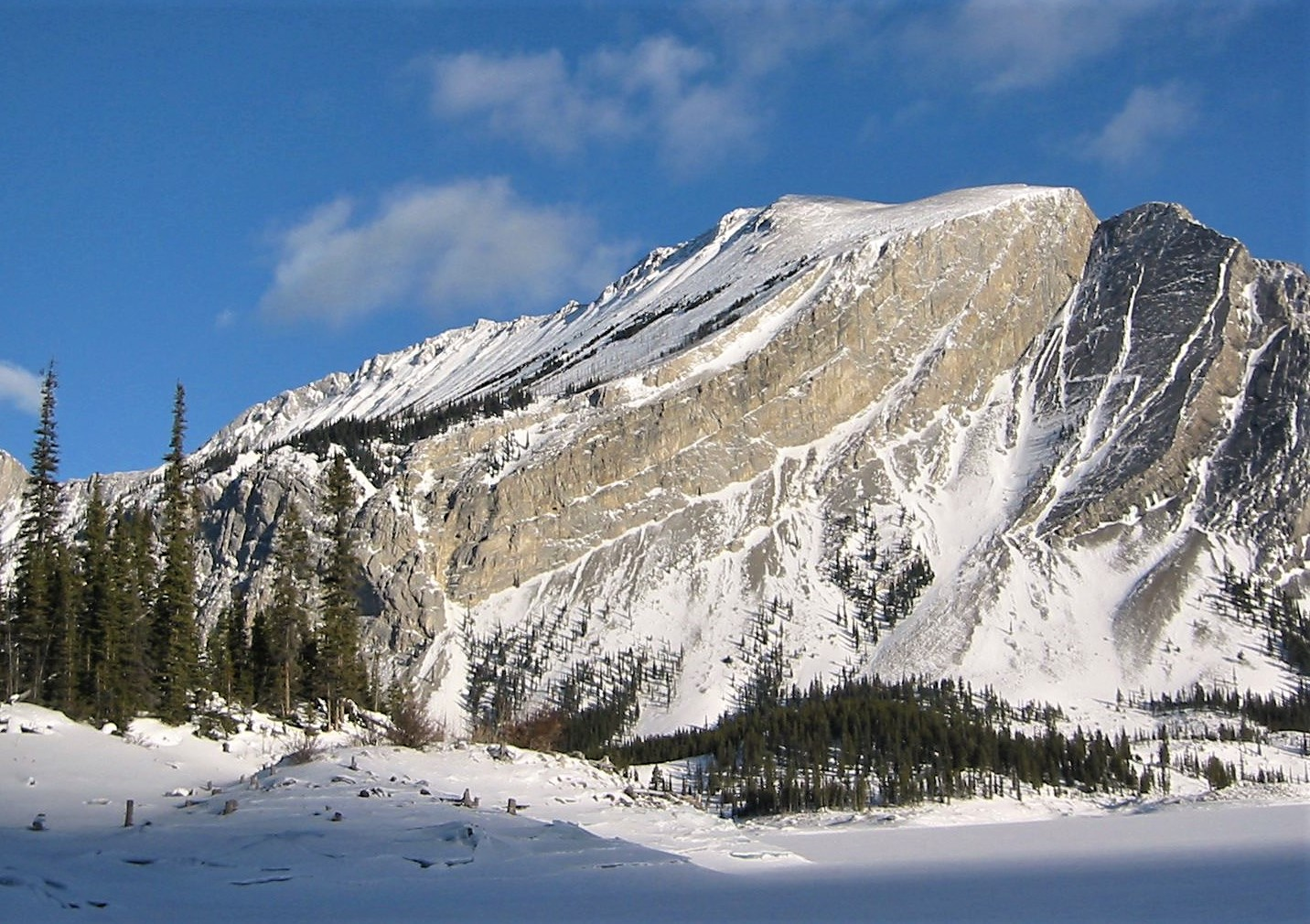

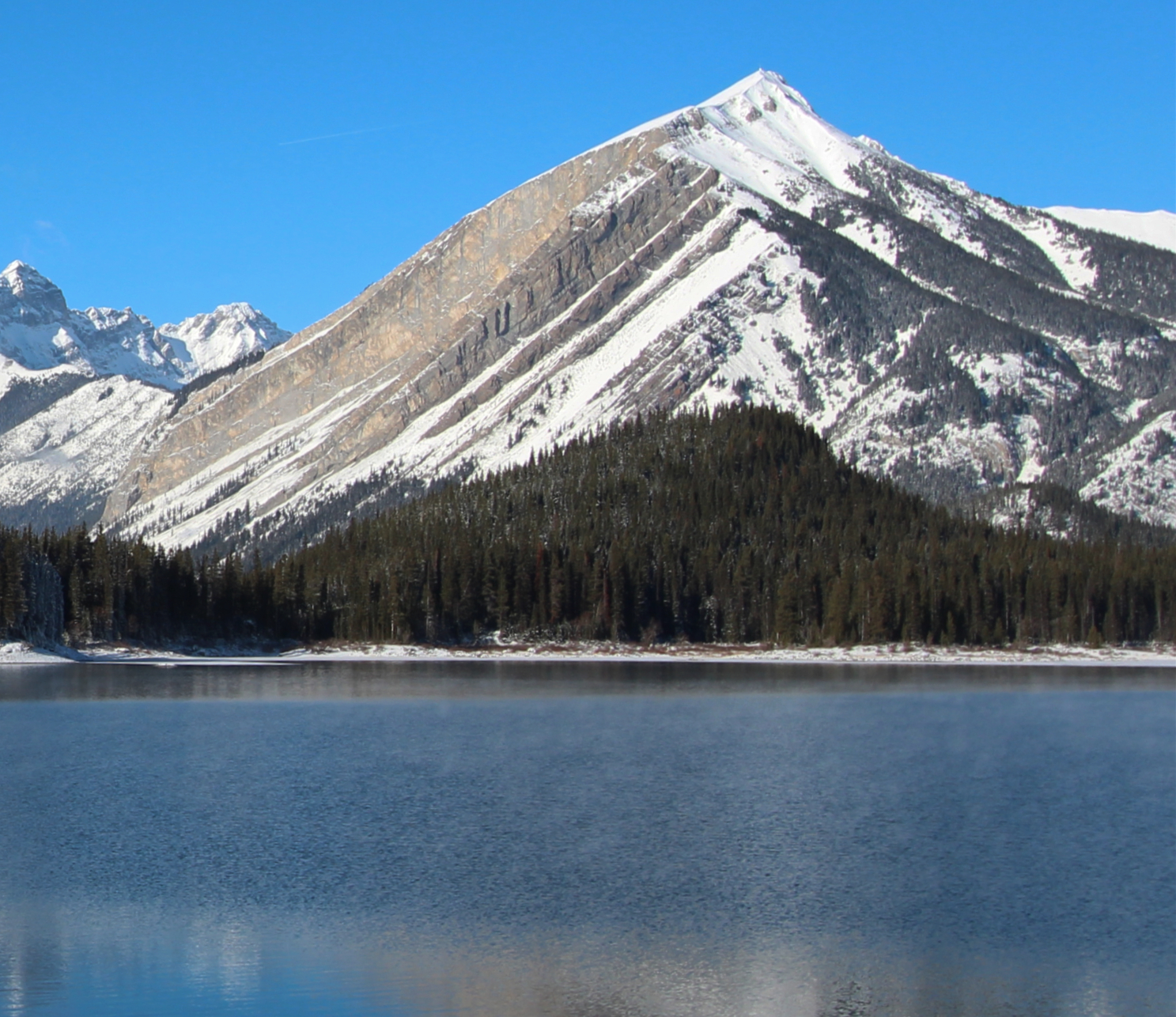
Mount Indefatigable

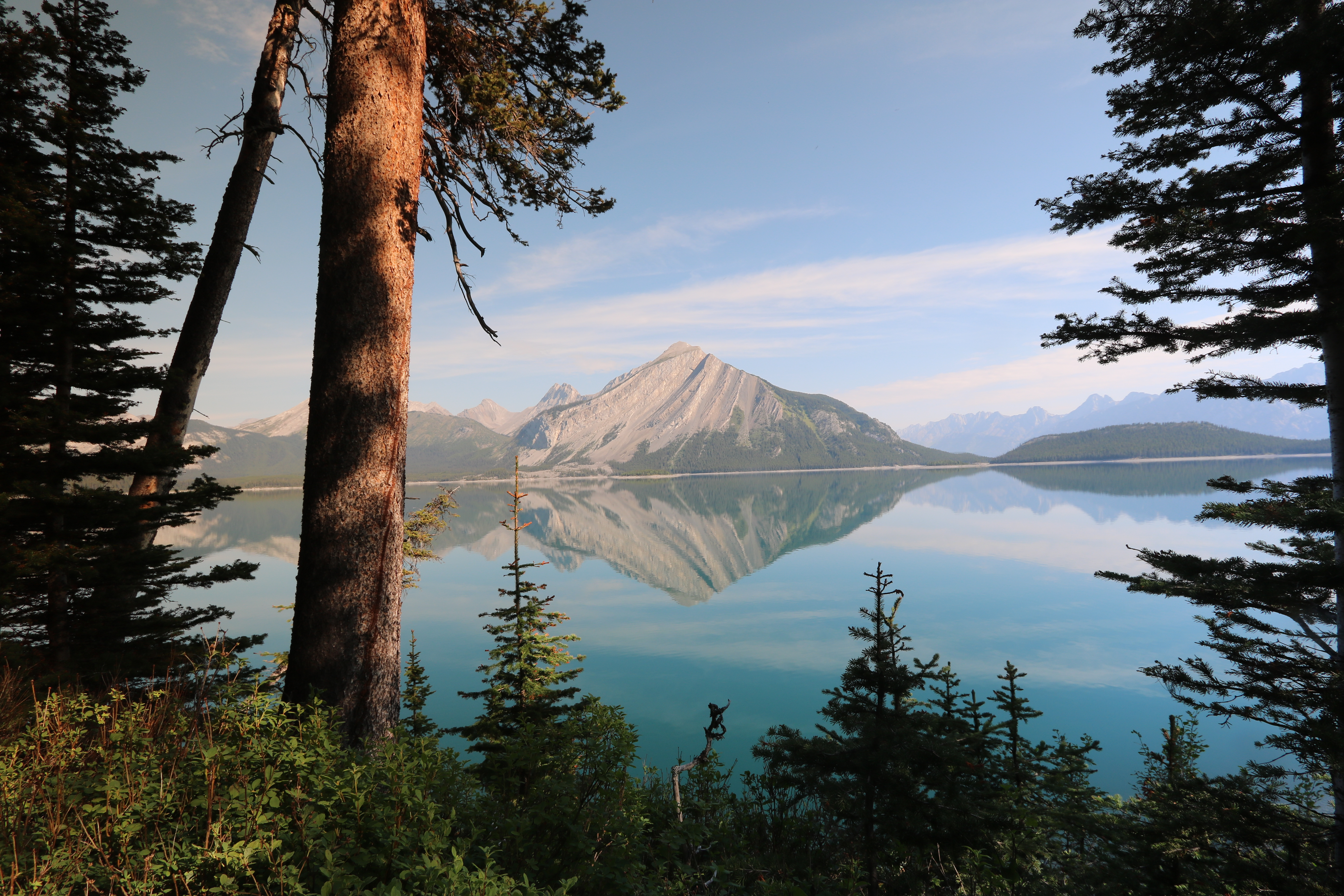
Mount Indefatigable reflected in Upper Kananaskis Lake

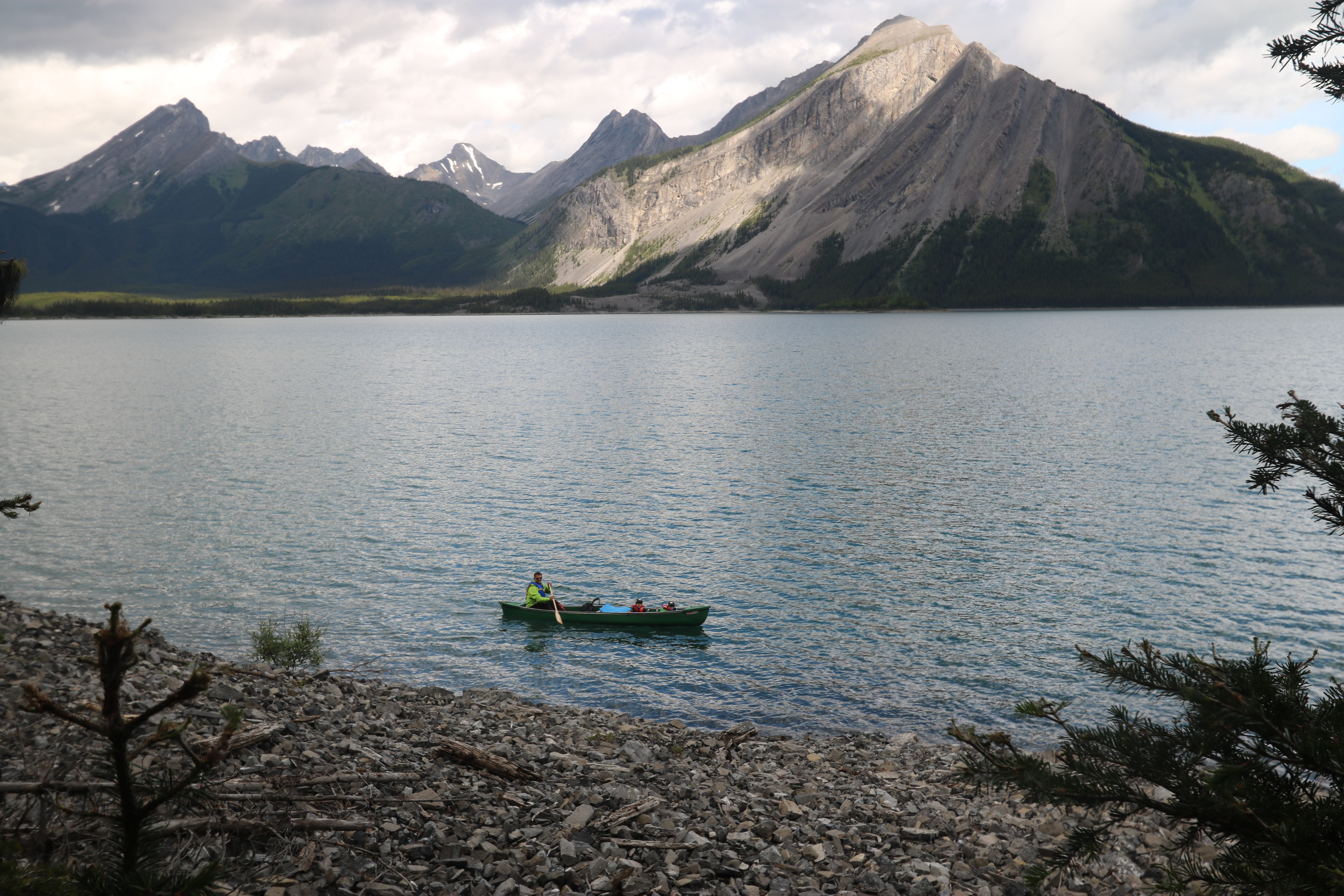
Indefatigable on the right side

== See also ==
- List of mountains in the Canadian Rockies
- Geography of Alberta
