= Mount Invincible =

Mountain in Alberta, Canada

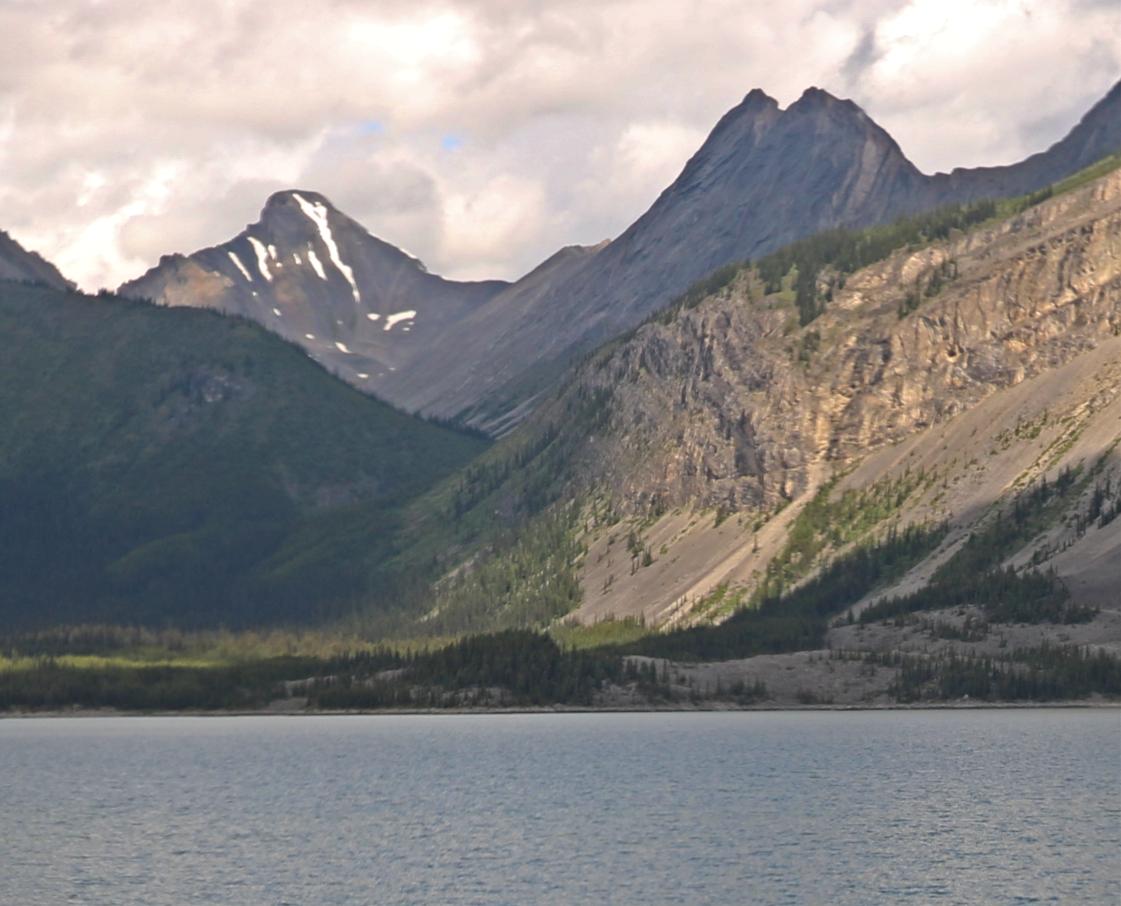
- Warspite (left) and Invincible (right) seen from Upper Kananaskis Lake

Highest point
- Elevation: 2,700 m (8,900 ft)
- Prominence: 140 m (460 ft)
- Parent peak: Mount Warspite (2850 m)
- Listing: Mountains of Alberta
- Coordinates: 50°39′50″N 115°11′27″W

Geography
- Location within Alberta Location within Canada
- Country: Canada
- Province: Alberta
- Parent range: Spray Mountains; Canadian Rockies
- Topo map: NTS 82J11 Kananaskis Lakes

Climbing
- First ascent: 1957 by F. Crickard, R. Higgins, Hans Gmoser
- Easiest route: Scramble

Mount Invincible is a 2,700-metre (8,900-foot) mountain summit located in Peter Lougheed Provincial Park in the Canadian Rockies of Alberta, Canada. The peak is visible from Alberta Highway 40, and the Upper and Lower Kananaskis Lakes area. Mount Invincible's nearest higher peak is Mount Warspite, 2.6 km (1.6 mi) to the northwest.

Like so many of the mountains in Kananaskis Country, Mount Invincible received its name from the persons and ships involved in the 1916 Battle of Jutland, a major sea battle of the First World War.

== History ==
Mount Invincible was named in 1917 to honor HMS Invincible, a British battlecruiser that sank during the Battle of Jutland in World War I. The mountain's name was made official in 1922 by the Geographical Names Board of Canada.

The first ascent of the peak was made in 1957 by F. Crickard and R. Higgins, with Hans Gmoser as guide.

== Geology ==
Mount Invincible is composed of sedimentary rock laid down during the Precambrian to Jurassic periods. Formed in shallow seas, this sedimentary rock was pushed east and over the top of younger rock during the Laramide orogeny.

== Climate ==
Based on the Köppen climate classification, Mount Invincible is located in a subarctic climate with cold, snowy winters, and mild summers. Temperatures can drop below −20 °C (−4 °F) with wind chill factors below −30 °C (−22 °F). Precipitation runoff from the mountain drains into the Kananaskis River which is a tributary of the Bow River.

== See also ==
- List of mountains in the Canadian Rockies
