= Commonwealth Peak =

Mountain summit in Alberta, Canada

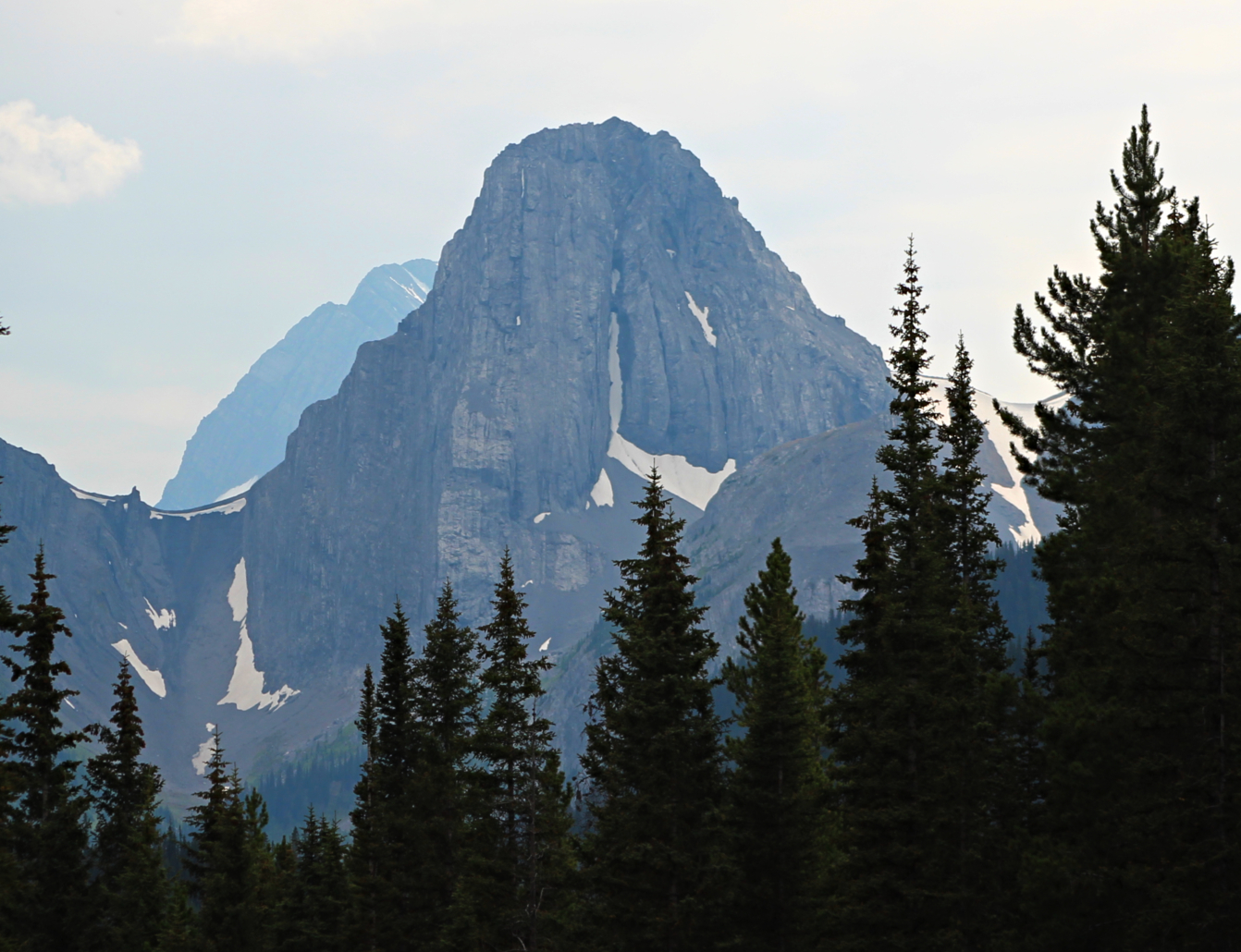

Highest point
- Elevation: 2,775 m (9,104 ft)
- Prominence: 215 m (705 ft)
- Parent peak: Mount Birdwood (3097 m)
- Listing: Mountains of Alberta
- Coordinates: 50°47′25″N 115°20′55″W

Geography
- Location within Alberta Location within Canada
- Interactive map of Commonwealth Peak
- Country: Canada
- Province: Alberta
- Protected area: Peter Lougheed Provincial Park
- Parent range: Spray Mountains; Canadian Rockies
- Topo map: NTS 82J14 Spray Lakes Reservoir

Geology
- Rock age: Cambrian
- Rock type: Limestone

Climbing
- First ascent: 1970 Charlie Locke, Lloyd McKay
- Easiest route: Moderate Scramble on SW face

Commonwealth Peak is a 2,775-metre (9,104-foot) mountain summit in the Spray Mountains, a sub-range of the Canadian Rockies in Alberta, Canada. The mountain is situated in Peter Lougheed Provincial Park. Its nearest higher peak is Mount Birdwood, 1.0 km (0.62 mi) to the west. Both can be seen from Alberta Highway 742, also known as Smith-Dorrien/Spray Trail in Kananaskis Country.

== History ==
Commonwealth Peak was named in 1979 to commemorate the 1978 Commonwealth Games that were held in Edmonton, Alberta.

The mountain's name was officially adopted in 1979 by the Geographical Names Board of Canada.

The first ascent of the peak was made in 1970 by Charlie Locke and Lloyd McKay.

== Geology ==
Commonwealth Peak is composed of sedimentary rock laid down during the Precambrian to Jurassic periods. Formed in shallow seas, this sedimentary rock was pushed east and over the top of younger rock during the Laramide orogeny.

== Climate ==
Based on the Köppen climate classification, Commonwealth Peak is located in a subarctic climate zone with cold, snowy winters, and mild summers. Temperatures can drop below −20 °C with wind chill factors below −30 °C. In terms of favorable weather, July through September are the best months to climb.

== See also ==
- Scrambles in the Canadian Rockies
- Geography of Alberta
