= Mount Murray (Alberta) =

Mountain in Alberta, Canada

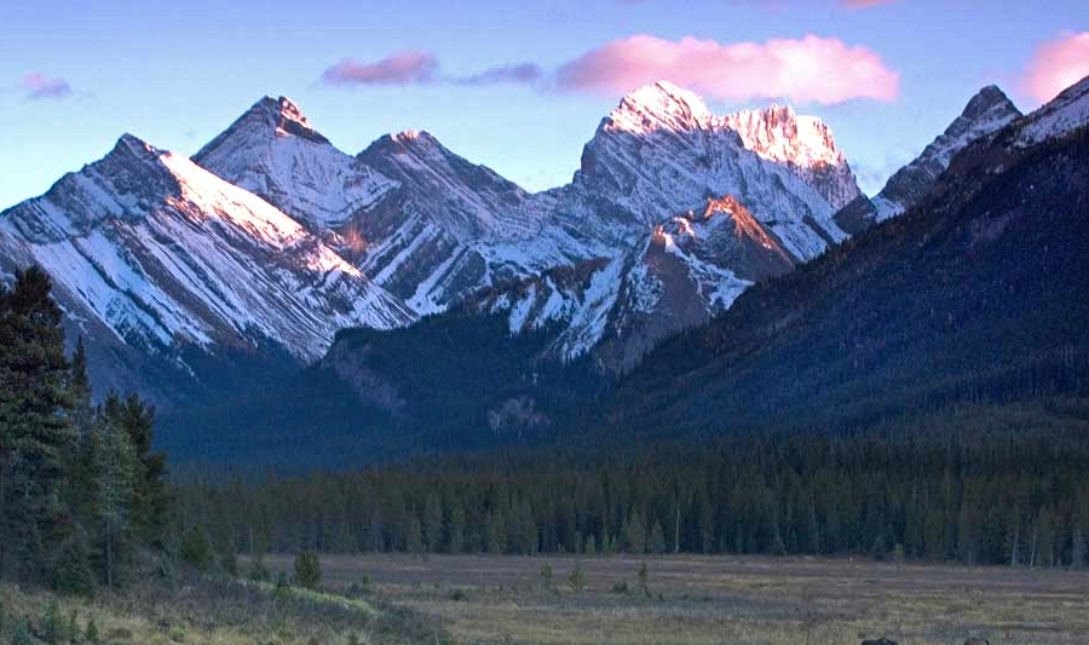
- Mount Murray to left of center. (Mount French right of center under cloud)

Highest point
- Elevation: 3,026 m (9,928 ft)
- Prominence: 313 m (1,027 ft)
- Parent peak: Mount French (3244 m)
- Listing: Mountains of Alberta
- Coordinates: 50°44′57″N 115°17′35″W

Geography
- Location within Alberta Location within Canada
- Country: Canada
- Province: Alberta
- Parent range: Spray Mountains; Canadian Rockies
- Topo map(s): NTS 82J11 Kananaskis Lakes; 82J14 Spray Lakes Reservoir

Geology
- Rock age: Cambrian
- Rock type: Sedimentary rock

Climbing
- Easiest route: Moderate scramble

Mount Murray is a 3,026-metre (9,928-foot) mountain summit in the Spray Mountains range of the Canadian Rockies in Alberta, Canada. The mountain is situated in Peter Lougheed Provincial Park of Kananaskis Country. Its nearest higher peak is Mount French, 2.0 km (1.2 mi) to the south-southwest. Mount Murray can be seen from Alberta Highway 742, the Smith-Dorrien/Spray Trail.

== History ==
The mountain was named in 1918 for General Sir A. J. Murray, (1860-1945). Murray was a British Army officer who served in the Second Boer War and the First World War as Commander-in-Chief of the Egyptian Expeditionary Force from 1916 to 1917.

The mountain's name was officially adopted in 1928 by the Geographical Names Board of Canada.

== Geology ==
Mount Murray is composed of sedimentary rock laid down during the Precambrian to Jurassic periods. Formed in shallow seas, this sedimentary rock was pushed east and over the top of younger rock during the Laramide orogeny.

== Climate ==
Based on the Köppen climate classification, Mount Murray is located in a subarctic climate with cold, snowy winters, and mild summers. Temperatures can drop below −20 °C with wind chill factors below −30 °C. In terms of favorable weather conditions, July to September is best for climbing.

== See also ==
- Geography of Alberta
