= Mount Jellicoe =

Mountain in the country of Canada

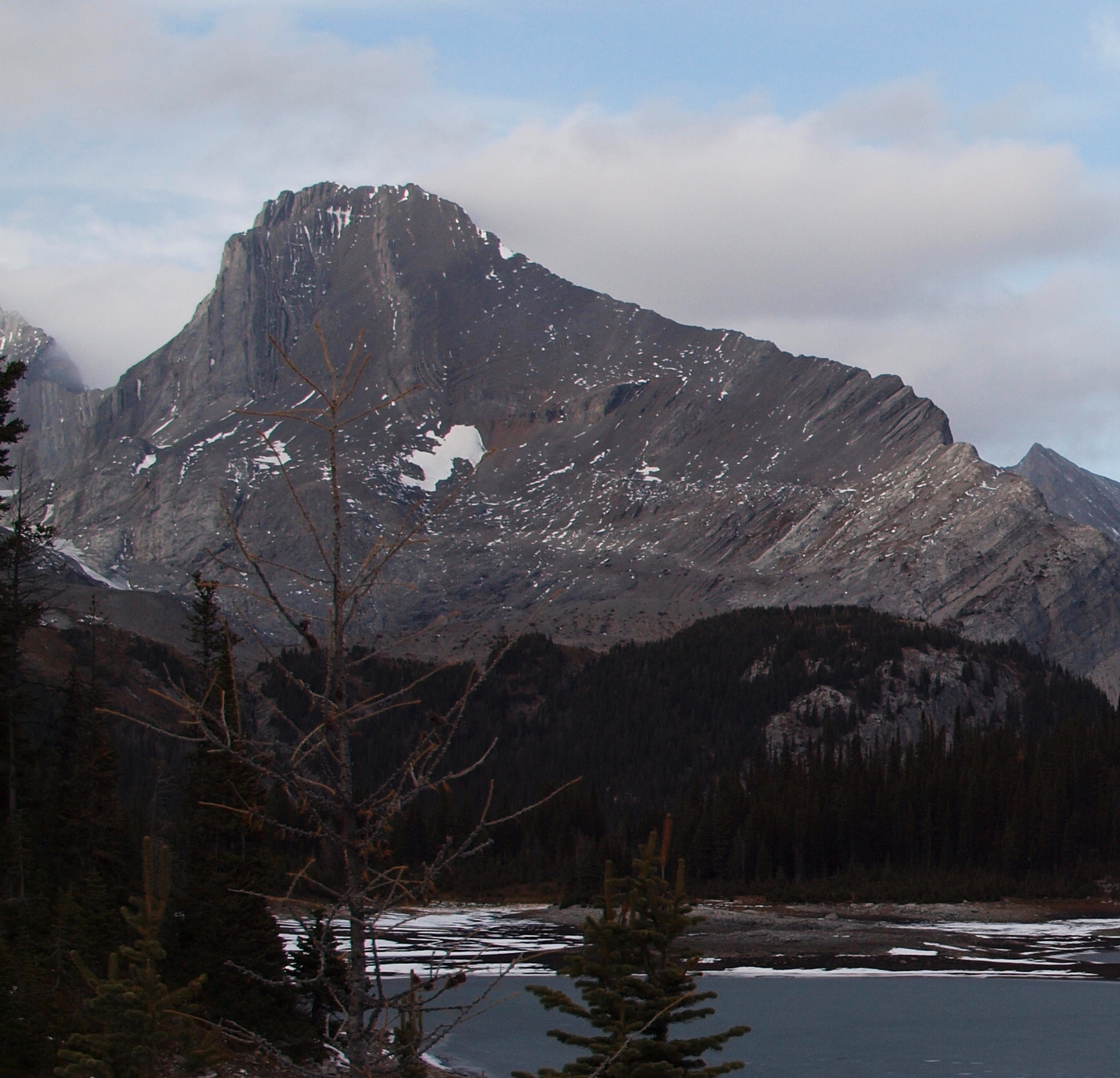
- Mount Jellicoe seen from Turbine Canyon

Highest point
- Elevation: 3,075 m (10,089 ft)
- Prominence: 179 m (587 ft)
- Parent peak: Mount Smith-Dorrien (3151 m)
- Listing: Mountains of Alberta
- Coordinates: 50°42′52″N 115°17′20″W

Geography
- Location within Alberta Location within Canada
- Interactive map of Mount Jellicoe
- Location: Peter Lougheed Provincial Park; Alberta, Canada
- Parent range: Spray Mountains; Canadian Rockies
- Topo map: NTS 82J11 Kananaskis Lakes

Geology
- Rock age: Cambrian
- Rock type: Sedimentary rock

Climbing
- First ascent: 1922 E.W. Crawford, W. Gillespie, M.D. Geddes, M.P. Hendrie, N.D.B. Hendrie
- Easiest route: Scramble

Mount Jellicoe is a 3,075-metre (10,089-foot) mountain summit located in Peter Lougheed Provincial Park in the Canadian Rockies of Alberta, Canada. Its nearest higher peak is Mount Smith-Dorrien, 2.0 km (1.2 mi) to the north. The Haig Glacier lies below the west aspect of Jellicoe, and the Smith-Dorrien Glacier lies to the north. The Continental Divide is 2.0 km (1.2 mi) to the west.

Like so many of the mountains in Kananaskis Country, Mount Jellicoe received its name from the persons and ships involved in the 1916 Battle of Jutland, the only major sea battle of the First World War.

== History ==
Mount Jellicoe was named in 1918 to honor Admiral of the Fleet John R. Jellicoe (1859–1935), the commander of the British Grand Fleet who led the Royal Navy into the Battle of Jutland in World War I.

The first ascent of the peak was made in 1922 by E.W. Crawford, W. Gillespie, M.D. Geddes, M.P. Hendrie, and N.D.B. Hendrie.

The mountain's toponym was officially adopted in 1924 by the Geographical Names Board of Canada.

== Geology ==
Mount Jellicoe is composed of sedimentary rock laid down during the Precambrian to Jurassic periods. Formed in shallow seas, this sedimentary rock was pushed east and over the top of younger rock during the Laramide orogeny.

== Climate ==
Based on the Köppen climate classification, Mount Jellicoe is located in a subarctic climate with cold, snowy winters, and mild summers. Temperatures can drop below −20 °C with wind chill factors below −30 °C. In terms of favorable weather, July through September are the best months to climb. Precipitation runoff from the mountain drains into headwaters of the Upper Kananaskis River.

== Gallery ==
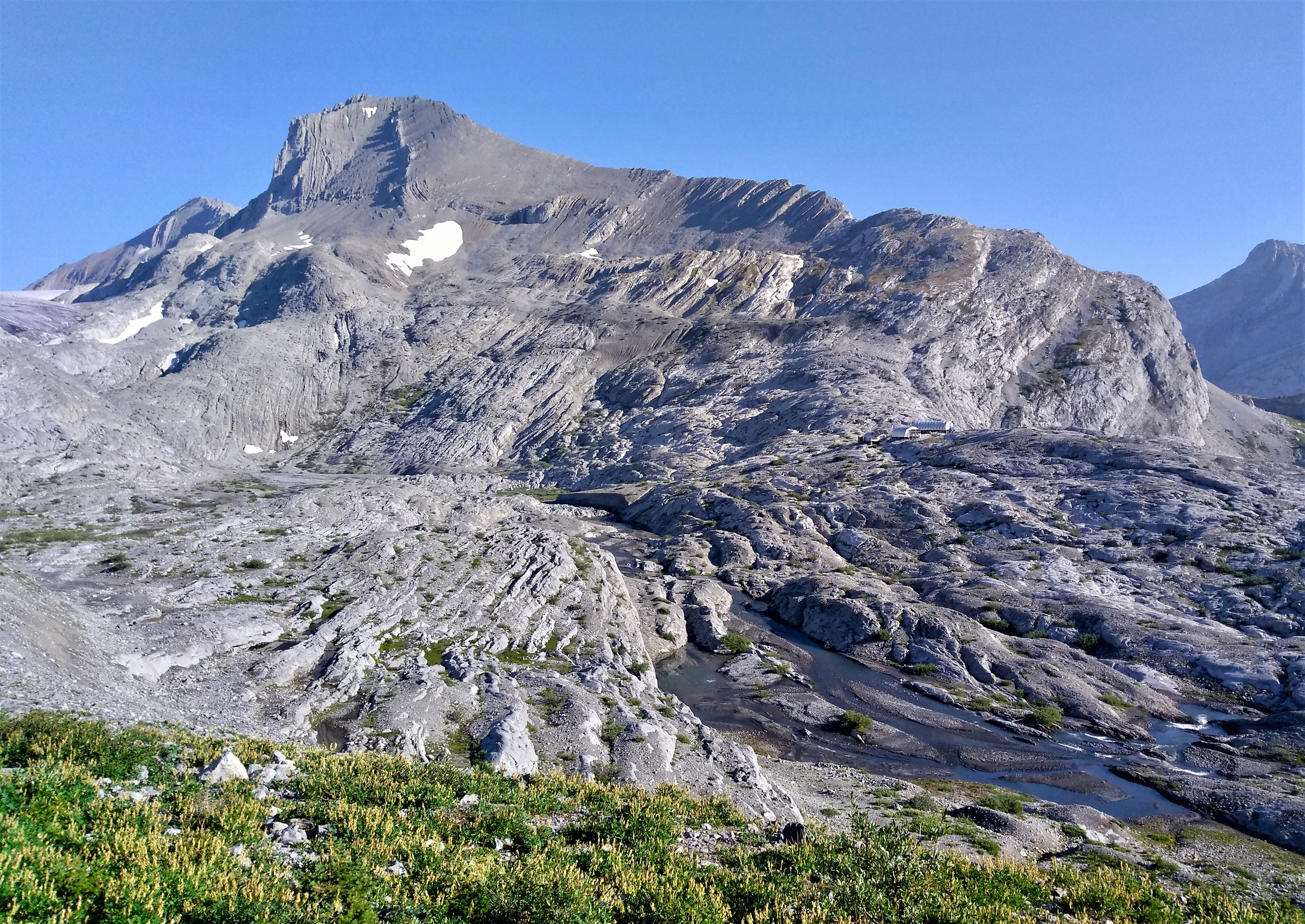
Mount Jellicoe, south aspect

== See also ==
- Alberta's Rockies
- Geography of Alberta
- Geology of the Rocky Mountains
