= Mount Nomad =

Mountain in Alberta, Canada

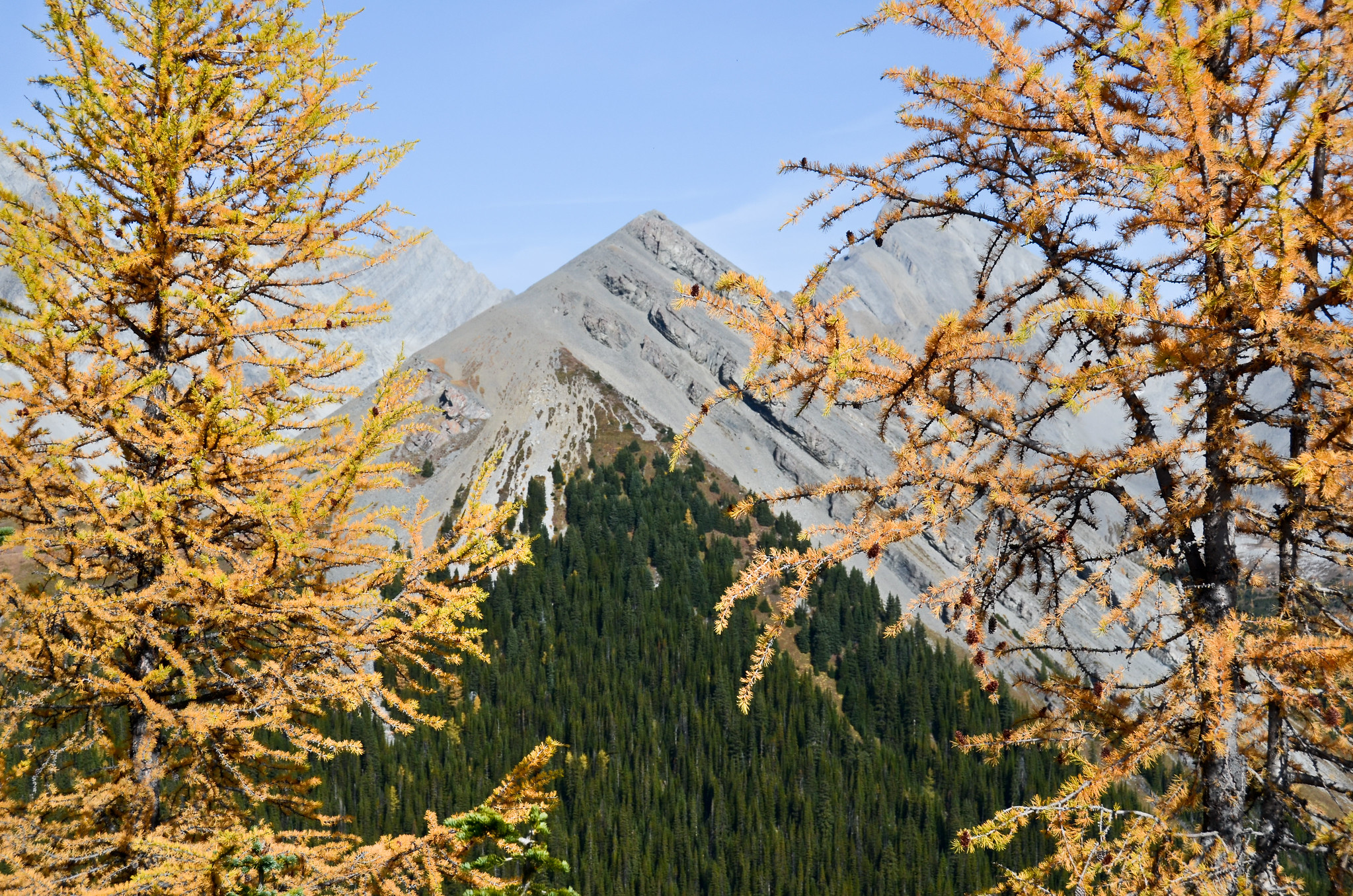
- Mount Nomad between larch trees

Highest point
- Elevation: 2,544 m (8,346 ft)
- Prominence: 185 m (607 ft)
- Listing: Mountains of Alberta
- Coordinates: 50°39′48″N 115°12′38″W

Naming
- Etymology: HMS Nomad

Geography
- Location within Alberta Location within Canada
- Country: Canada
- Province: Alberta
- Protected area: Peter Lougheed Provincial Park
- Parent range: Spray Mountains; Canadian Rockies
- Topo map: NTS 82J11 Kananaskis Lakes

Climbing
- Easiest route: Hike

Mount Nomad is a 2,544-metre (8,346 ft) mountain summit located in Peter Lougheed Provincial Park in the Canadian Rockies of Alberta, Canada.

== History ==
In 1991, The Grand Fleet Expedition recommended that the mountain be named after HMS Nomad in order to commemorate the seventy-fifth anniversary of the Battle of Jutland. The mountain's name was officially adopted in 1995.
