= Mount Warspite =

Mountain in Alberta, Canada

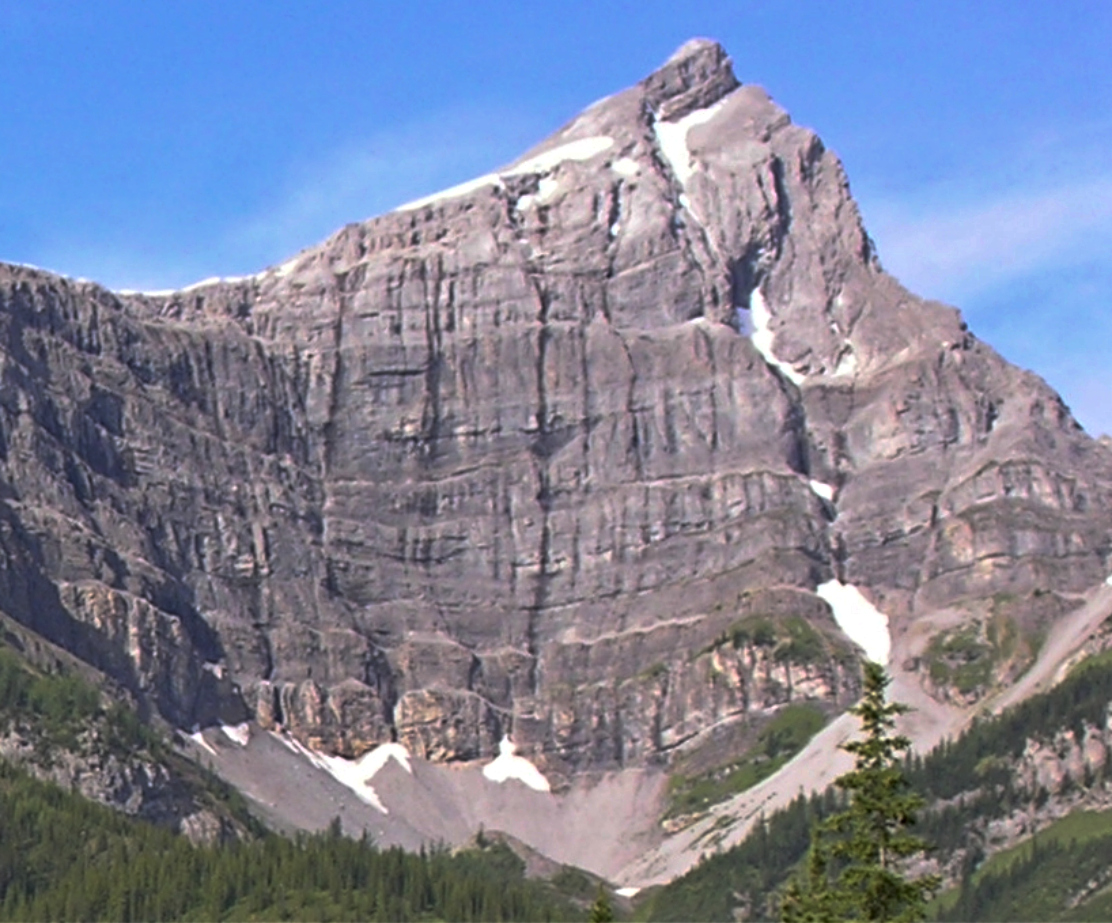
- Mount Warspite, northeast face

Highest point
- Elevation: 2,850 m (9,350 ft) (Note: Another source states 2860 m.)
- Prominence: 240 m (790 ft)
- Parent peak: Mount Black Prince (2939 m)
- Listing: Mountains of Alberta
- Coordinates: 50°40′52″N 115°12′59″W

Geography
- Location within Alberta Location within Canada
- Country: Canada
- Province: Alberta
- Protected area: Peter Lougheed Provincial Park
- Parent range: Spray Mountains; Canadian Rockies
- Topo map: NTS 82J11 Kananaskis Lakes

Climbing
- Easiest route: Difficult Scramble

Mount Warspite is a 2,850-metre (9,350-foot) mountain summit located in Peter Lougheed Provincial Park in the Canadian Rockies of Alberta, Canada. The peak is visible from Smith-Dorrien Road (742), and Alberta Highway 40 in the Kananaskis Lakes area. Mount Warspite's nearest higher peak is Mount Black Prince, located 2.4 km (1.5 mi) to the northwest.

Like many of the mountains in Kananaskis Country, Mount Warspite is named after figures and ships involved in the 1916 Battle of Jutland, a significant naval engagement of the First World War. Mount Warspite was named in 1917 for the British battleship HMS Warspite, one of the most decorated and revered ships in Royal Navy history that fought during the Battle of Jutland and survived to also serve in World War II. The mountain's name was officially adopted in 1922 by the Geographical Names Board of Canada.

== Geology ==
Mount Warspite is composed of sedimentary rock laid down during the Precambrian to Jurassic periods. Formed in shallow seas, this sedimentary rock was pushed east and over the top of younger rock during the Laramide orogeny.

== Climate ==
Based on the Köppen climate classification, Mount Warspite is located in a subarctic climate zone with cold, snowy winters, and mild summers. Temperatures can drop below −20 °C (−4 °F) with wind chill factors below −30 °C (−22 °F). Precipitation runoff from the mountain drains into tributaries of the Kananaskis River, thence into the Bow River.

== See also ==
- List of mountains in the Canadian Rockies
- Geography of Alberta
