= Mount French (Alberta) =

Mountain in the country of Canada

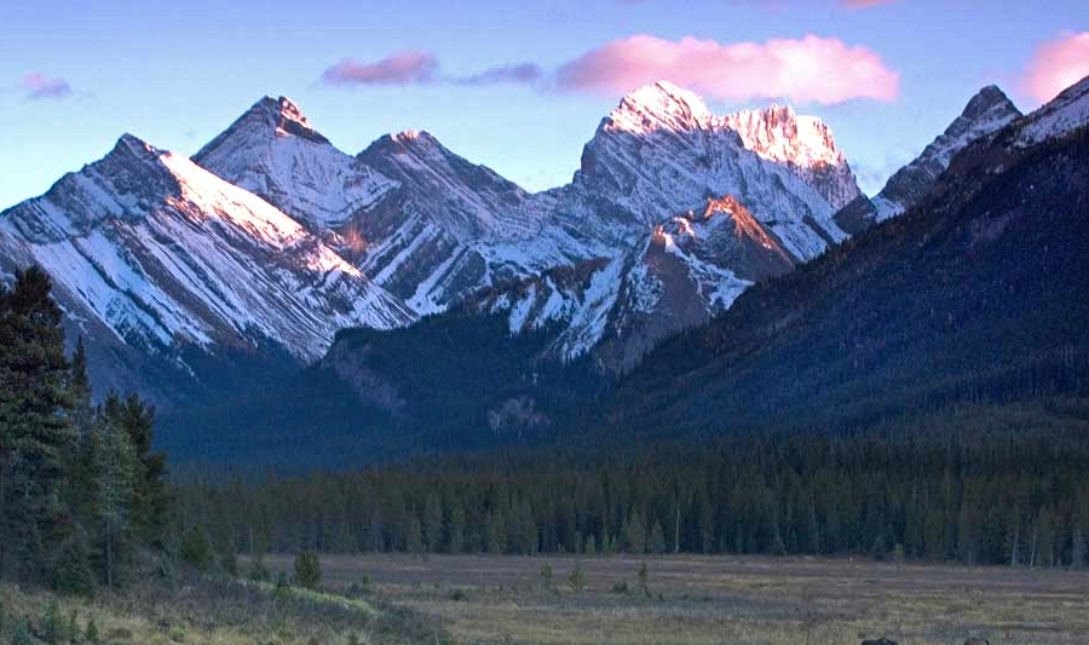
- Mount French (right of center under cloud) seen from the north. Mount Murray to left of center.

Highest point
- Elevation: 3,244 m (10,643 ft) (Note: Other sources state 3234 m.)
- Prominence: 470 m (1,540 ft)
- Parent peak: Mount Sir Douglas (3411 m)
- Listing: Mountains of Alberta
- Coordinates: 50°43′45″N 115°18′20″W

Geography
- Location within Alberta Location within Canada
- Location: Alberta, Canada
- Parent range: Spray Mountains; Canadian Rockies
- Topo map: NTS 82J11 Kananaskis Lakes

Geology
- Rock age: Cambrian
- Rock type: sedimentary rock

Climbing
- First ascent: 1921 by M. Morton Jr., H.S. Hall Jr., Edward Feuz Jr.
- Easiest route: Difficult Scramble/Mountaineering

Mount French is a 3,244-metre (10,643-foot) summit in the Spray Mountains range of the Canadian Rockies in Alberta, Canada. The mountain is situated in Peter Lougheed Provincial Park of Kananaskis Country. French is the second highest point in the Spray Mountains Range. Its nearest higher peak, and highest in the Spray Range, is Mount Sir Douglas, 3.0 km (1.9 mi) to the west. Mount French can be seen from Alberta Highway 742, the Smith-Dorrien/Spray Trail.

== History ==
It was named in 1915 by Morrison P. Bridgland (1878-1948), a Dominion Land Surveyor after Sir John French (1852-1925). French was Commander-in-chief of the British Forces (1914-1915) during the first 16 months of World War I, and in 1922 he was named the first Earl of Ypres.

The first ascent was made in 1921 by M. Morton Jr. and H.S. Hall Jr., with Edward Feuz Jr. as guide.

The mountain's name was officially adopted in 1924 by the Geographical Names Board of Canada.

== Geology ==
Mount French is composed of sedimentary rock laid down during the Precambrian to Jurassic periods. Formed in shallow seas, this sedimentary rock was pushed east and over the top of younger rock during the Laramide orogeny. The French Glacier resides immediately west of the peak. The Haig Glacier, largest singular glacier in Kananaskis Country, lies to the south. The Smith-Dorrien Glacier is situated on the east side of Mount French.

== Climate ==
Based on the Köppen climate classification, Mount French is located in a subarctic climate with cold, snowy winters, and mild summers. Temperatures can drop below −20 °C with wind chill factors below −30 °C.

== See also ==
- List of mountains in the Canadian Rockies
- Scrambles in the Canadian Rockies, Alan Kane, 3rd edition, page 139
