= Mount Burstall =

Mountain in Alberta, Canada

- Location within Alberta Location within Canada

Highest point
- Elevation: 2,760 m (9,060 ft)
- Prominence: 245 m (804 ft)
- Parent peak: Mount Sir Douglas (3406 m)
- Listing: Mountains of Alberta
- Coordinates: 50°46′10″N 115°19′31″W

Geography
- Country: Canada
- Province: Alberta
- Parent range: Spray Mountains; Canadian Rockies
- Topo map: NTS 82J14 Spray Lakes Reservoir

Geology
- Rock age: Cambrian
- Rock type: Sedimentary rock

Climbing
- First ascent: 1972 by M. Brown, I. Carruthers, C. Cobb, B.E. Seyforth
- Easiest route: Difficult Scramble

Mount Burstall is a summit in Alberta, Canada.

Mount Burstall was named for H. E. Burstall, a Canadian Army officer who commanded the 2nd Canadian Division during World War I.
