= Mount Shark =

Mountain in Alberta, Canada

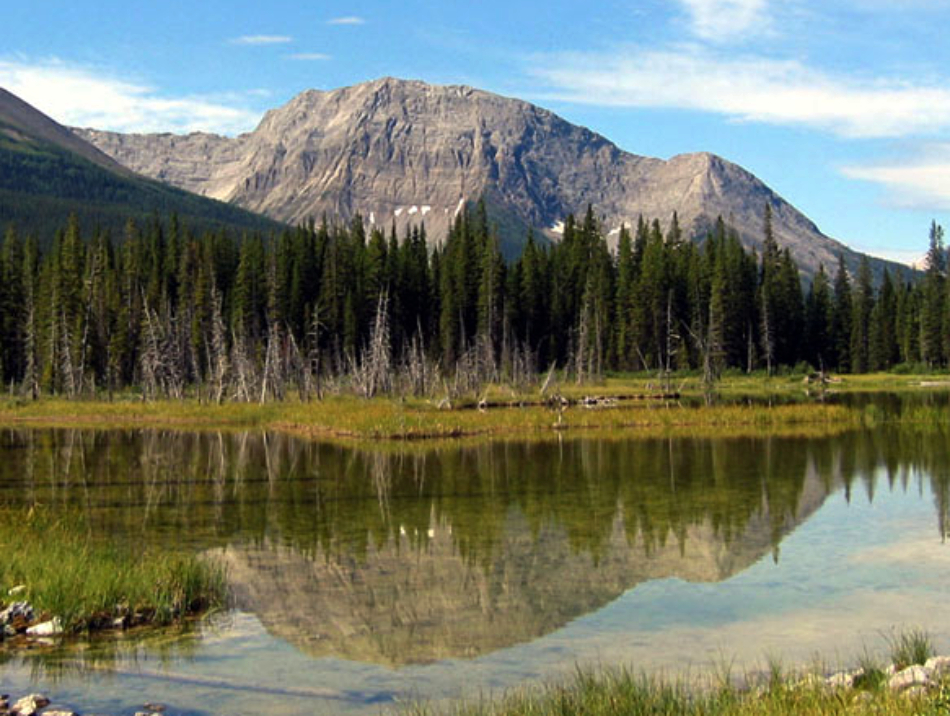
- Mount Shark, northeast aspect

Highest point
- Elevation: 2,786 m (9,140 ft)
- Prominence: 134 m (440 ft)
- Parent peak: Mount Smuts (2938 m)
- Listing: Mountains of Alberta
- Coordinates: 50°49′41″N 115°24′36″W

Geography
- Location within Alberta Location within Canada
- Interactive map of Mount Shark
- Location: Alberta, Canada
- Parent range: Spray Mountains; Canadian Rockies
- Topo map: NTS 82J14 Spray Lakes Reservoir

Geology
- Rock age: Cambrian
- Rock type: Sedimentary rock

Climbing
- Easiest route: Scramble

Mount Shark is a 2,786-metre (9,140-foot) mountain summit located in the Spray Valley of Kananaskis Country at the northern tip of the Spray Mountains range. It is situated on the southern boundary of Banff National Park in the Canadian Rockies of Alberta, Canada. Mount Shark in not visible from any road in Banff Park, however, it can be seen from Alberta Highway 742, also known as the Smith-Dorrien/Spray Trail. Mount Shark's nearest higher peak is Mount Smuts, 3.0 km (1.9 mi) to the southeast.

Like so many of the mountains in Kananaskis Country, Mount Shark received its name from the persons and ships involved in the 1916 Battle of Jutland, the only major sea battle of the First World War.

== History ==
Mount Shark was named in 1917 for HMS Shark, a British destroyer that was sunk by a torpedo launched by the German torpedo boat SMS S54 during the Battle of Jutland in World War I. The mountain's name was officially adopted in 1922 by the Geographical Names Board of Canada. Mount Shark and Mount Sparrowhawk were designated as sites to host alpine skiing events in Calgary's bid for the 1988 Winter Olympics, however, the venue for the alpine skiing events moved to Nakiska shortly after Calgary was awarded the Games.

== Geology ==
Mount Shark is composed of sedimentary rock laid down during the Precambrian to Jurassic periods. Formed in shallow seas, this sedimentary rock was pushed east and over the top of younger rock during the Laramide orogeny.

== Climate ==
Based on the Köppen climate classification, Mount Shark is located in a subarctic climate with cold, snowy winters, and mild summers. Temperatures can drop below −20 °C (−4 °F) with wind chill factors below −30 °C (−22 °F). Precipitation runoff from the mountain drains west into Spray Lakes Reservoir.

== Gallery ==
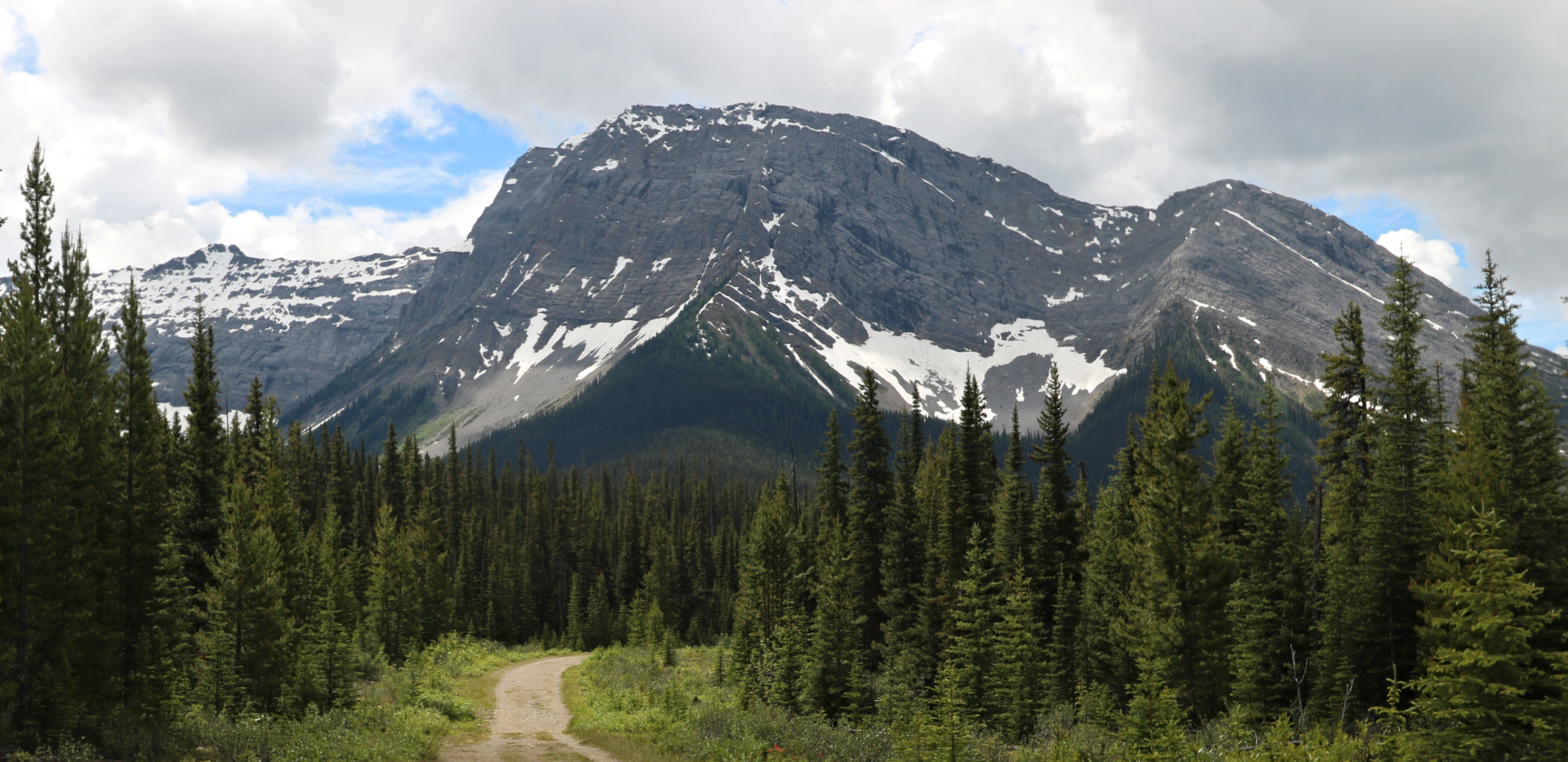
Mount Shark

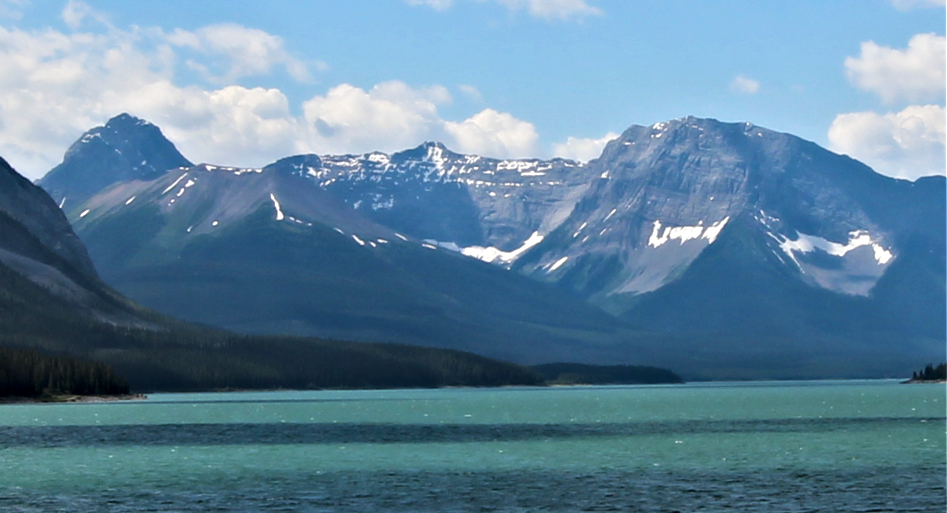
Mt. Smuts (left) and Mt. Shark (right) seen from Spray Lakes

== See also ==
- Mountains of Alberta
- Geography of Alberta
