= Mount French =

Mount French may refer to:

- Mount French (Queensland), a mountain in Queensland, Australia
- Mount French, Queensland, a locality in Queensland, Australia
- Mount French (Alberta), a mountain in Alberta, Canada
