= Mount Smuts =

Mountain in Alberta, Canada

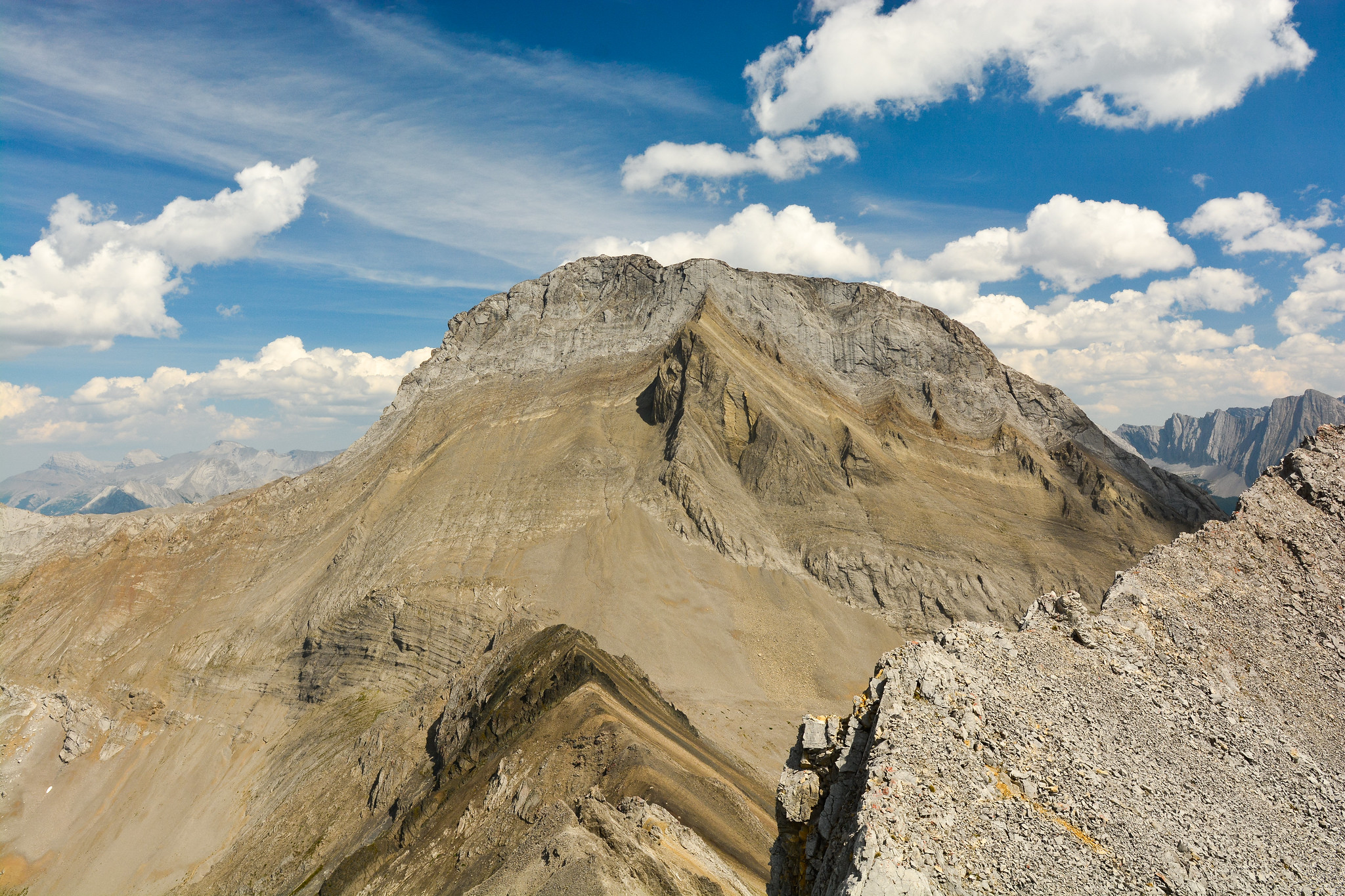
- West aspect of Mount Smuts

Highest point
- Elevation: 2,938 m (9,639 ft)
- Prominence: 591 m (1,939 ft)
- Parent peak: Mount Birdwood (3,097 m)
- Isolation: 2.8 km (1.7 mi)
- Listing: Mountains of Alberta
- Coordinates: 50°48′28″N 115°23′13″W

Geography
- Location within Alberta Location within Canada
- Interactive map of Mount Smuts
- Country: Canada
- Province: Alberta
- Parent range: Spray Mountains; Canadian Rockies
- Topo map: NTS 82J14 Spray Lakes Reservoir

Geology
- Rock age: Cambrian
- Rock type: Limestone

Climbing
- First ascent: 1926 M. Crosby, M. Kennard, H. S. Crosby, C. A. Willard, Rudolph Aemmer
- Easiest route: Scramble

Mount Smuts is a 2,938-metre (9,639-foot) mountain summit located in the Canadian Rockies of Alberta, Canada. It is set in the Spray Valley near the northern end of the Spray Mountains range. It is situated on the common boundary shared by Peter Lougheed Provincial Park with Banff National Park. Mount Smuts is not visible from any road in Banff Park, however it can be seen from Alberta Highway 742, also known as Smith-Dorrien/Spray Trail in Kananaskis Country. Mount Smuts' nearest higher neighbor is Mount Birdwood, 2.8 km (1.7 mi) to the south-southeast.

== History ==
Mount Smuts was named by the Interprovincial Boundary Commission in 1918 for General (later Field Marshal) Jan Smuts (1870–1950), a noted South African and British Imperial statesman and mountaineer. During World War I, he led the armies of South Africa against Germany, capturing German South-West Africa and commanding the British Army in East Africa in 1916-1917.

The mountain's toponym was officially adopted in 1924 by the Geographical Names Board of Canada.

The first ascent of the peak was made in 1926 by M. Crosby, M. Kennard, H. S. Crosby, C. A. Willard, with guide Rudolph Aemmer.

== Geology ==
Mount Smuts is composed of sedimentary rock laid down during the Precambrian to Jurassic periods. Formed in shallow seas, this sedimentary rock was pushed east and over the top of younger rock during the Laramide orogeny.

== Climate ==
Based on the Köppen climate classification, Mount Smuts is located in a subarctic climate zone with cold, snowy winters, and mild summers. Winter temperatures can drop below −20 °C with wind chill factors below −30 °C. In terms of favorable weather, July through September are the best months to climb. Precipitation runoff from the mountain drains west into Spray River, or east to Smuts Creek, both of which empty into Spray Lakes Reservoir.

== Climbing ==
Mount Smuts is a difficult and exposed scramble on limestone slabs via the south ridge, and very few parties successfully summit each year. Rope is recommended for anything less than ideal conditions.

== Gallery ==
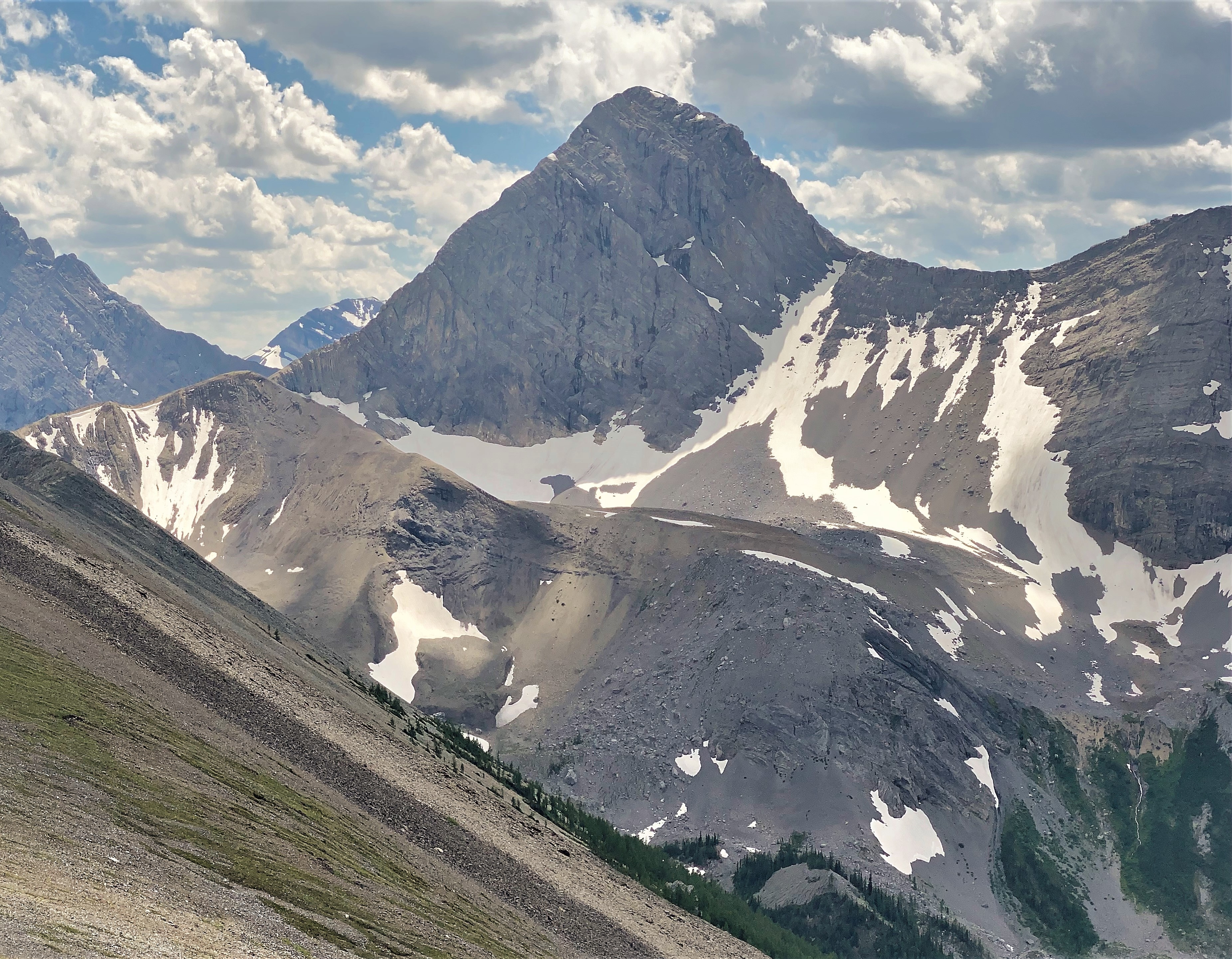
North aspect viewed from Tent Ridge

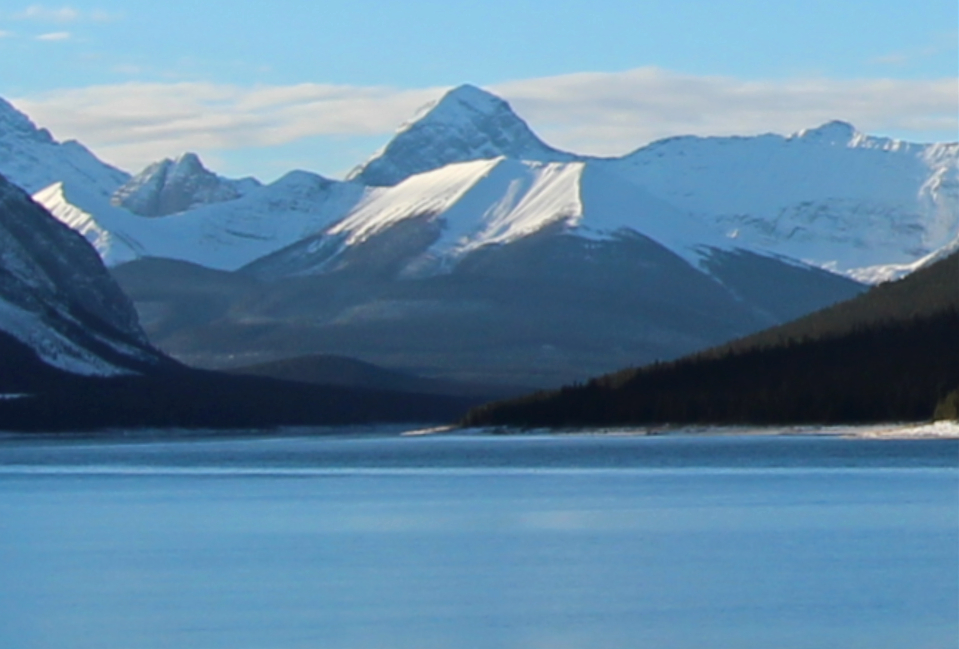
Mount Smuts seen from Spray Lake

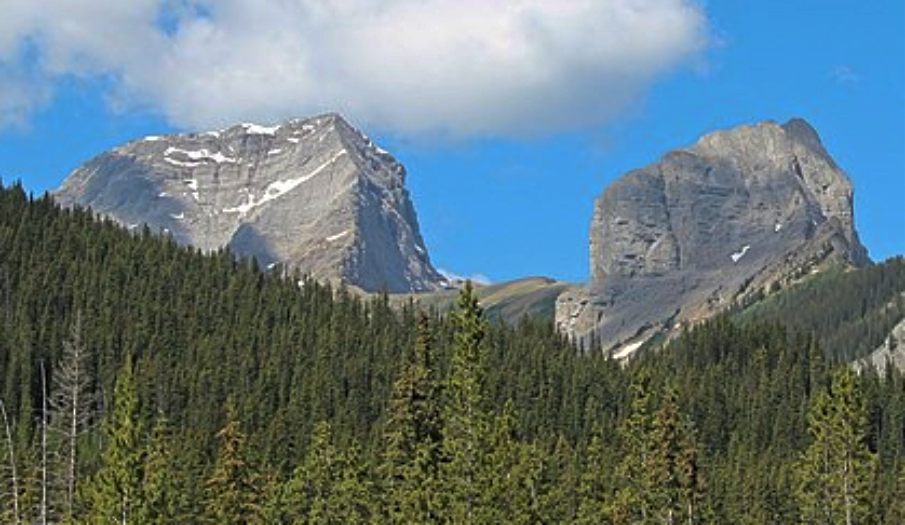
Mount Smuts (left) and The Fist seen from Smith-Dorrien Road

== See also ==
- Geography of Alberta
- List of peaks on the Alberta–British Columbia border
