= PLPP =

- a song by SDHS Family (meaning "pas là pour plaire")
- Peter Lougheed Provincial Park, a park in Alberta
- plasma lipoprotein particle, HDL and LDL cholesterol
- Pusat Latihan & Pembangunan Pengembangan
