= Mount Sparrowhawk =

Mountain in the Canadian Rockies

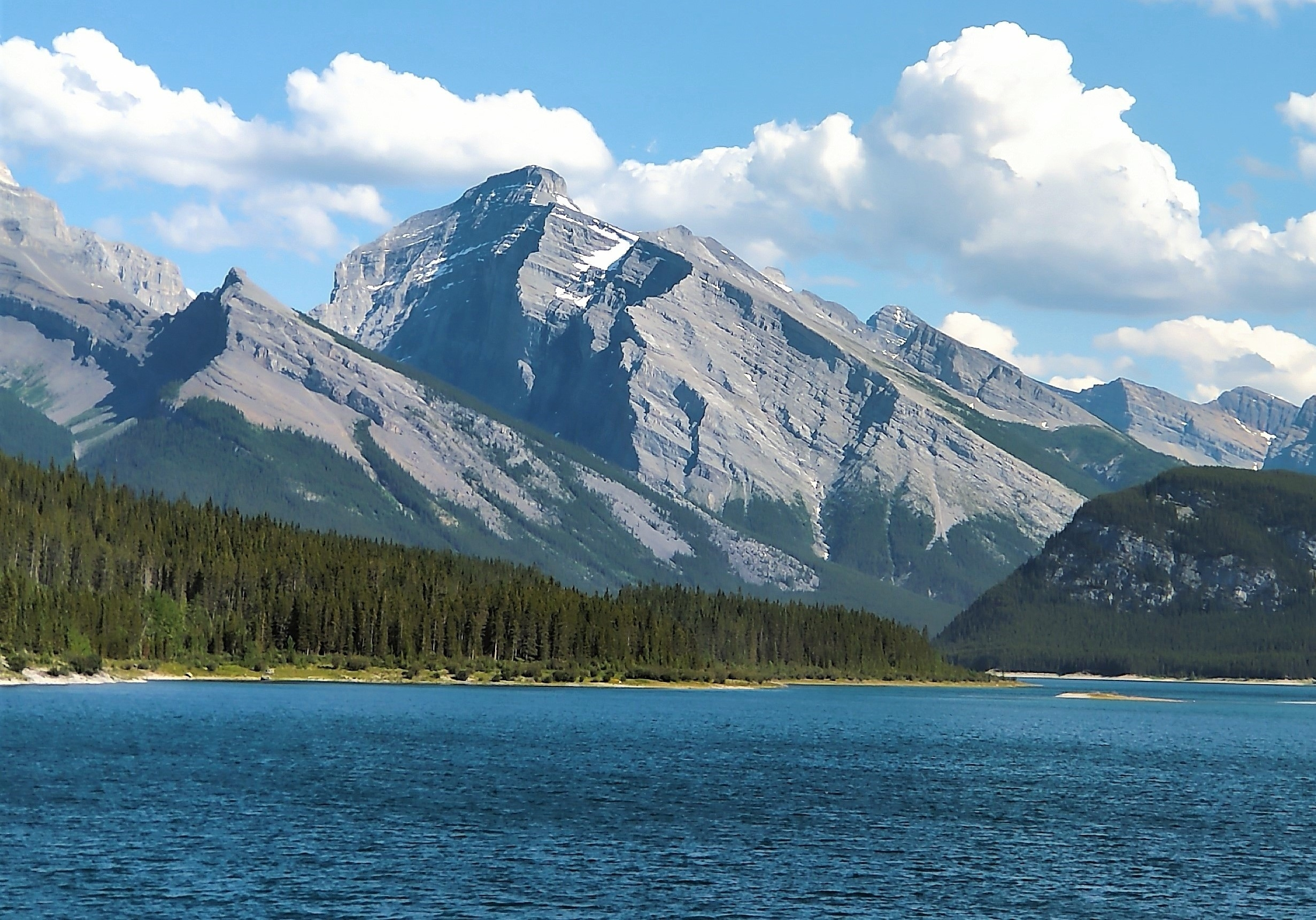
- Mount Sparrowhawk seen from Spray Lakes

Highest point
- Elevation: 3,121 m (10,240 ft)
- Prominence: 256 m (840 ft)
- Parent peak: Mount Bogart (3144 m)
- Listing: Mountains of Alberta
- Coordinates: 50°56′26″N 115°15′57″W

Geography
- Location within Alberta Location within Canada
- Interactive map of Mount Sparrowhawk
- Location: Alberta, Canada
- Parent range: Kananaskis Range; Canadian Rockies
- Topo map: NTS 82J14 Spray Lakes Reservoir

Geology
- Rock age: Cambrian
- Rock type: Limestone

Climbing
- First ascent: 1947 by R.C. Hind, L. Parker, Mr. and Mrs. H.H. Rans
- Easiest route: Scrambling South slope, Easy Scramble west slope

Mount Sparrowhawk is a 3,121-metre (10,240 ft) mountain summit located in Kananaskis Country in the Canadian Rockies of Alberta, Canada. Mount Sparrowhawk's nearest higher peak is Mount Bogart, 3.6 km (2.2 mi) to the southeast. Sparrowhawk's south slope was a candidate to be used as a ski hill for the alpine events at the 1988 Winter Olympics, but nearby Mount Allan's Nakiska was selected instead.

== History ==
Mount Sparrowhawk was named in 1917 for HMS Sparrowhawk, a British destroyer that sank during the Battle of Jutland in World War I. This mountain's name was officially adopted in 1922 by the Geographical Names Board of Canada.

The first ascent of the peak was made in 1947 by R.C. Hind, L. Parker, Mr. and Mrs. H.H. Rans.

Mount Shark and Mount Sparrowhawk were designated as sites to host alpine skiing events in Calgary's bid for the 1988 Winter Olympics, however, the venue for the alpine skiing events moved to Nakiska shortly after Calgary was awarded the Games.

== Geology ==
Mount Sparrowhawk is composed of sedimentary rock laid down during the Precambrian to Jurassic periods. Formed in shallow seas, this sedimentary rock was pushed east and over the top of younger rock during the Laramide orogeny.

== Climate ==
Based on the Köppen climate classification, Mount Sparrowhawk is located in a subarctic climate zone with cold, snowy winters, and mild summers. Winter temperatures can drop below −20 °C (−4 °F) with wind chill factors below −30 °C (−22 °F). Precipitation runoff from the mountain drains east into the Kananaskis River and west into Spray Lakes Reservoir, both of which empty to the Bow River.

== Gallery ==
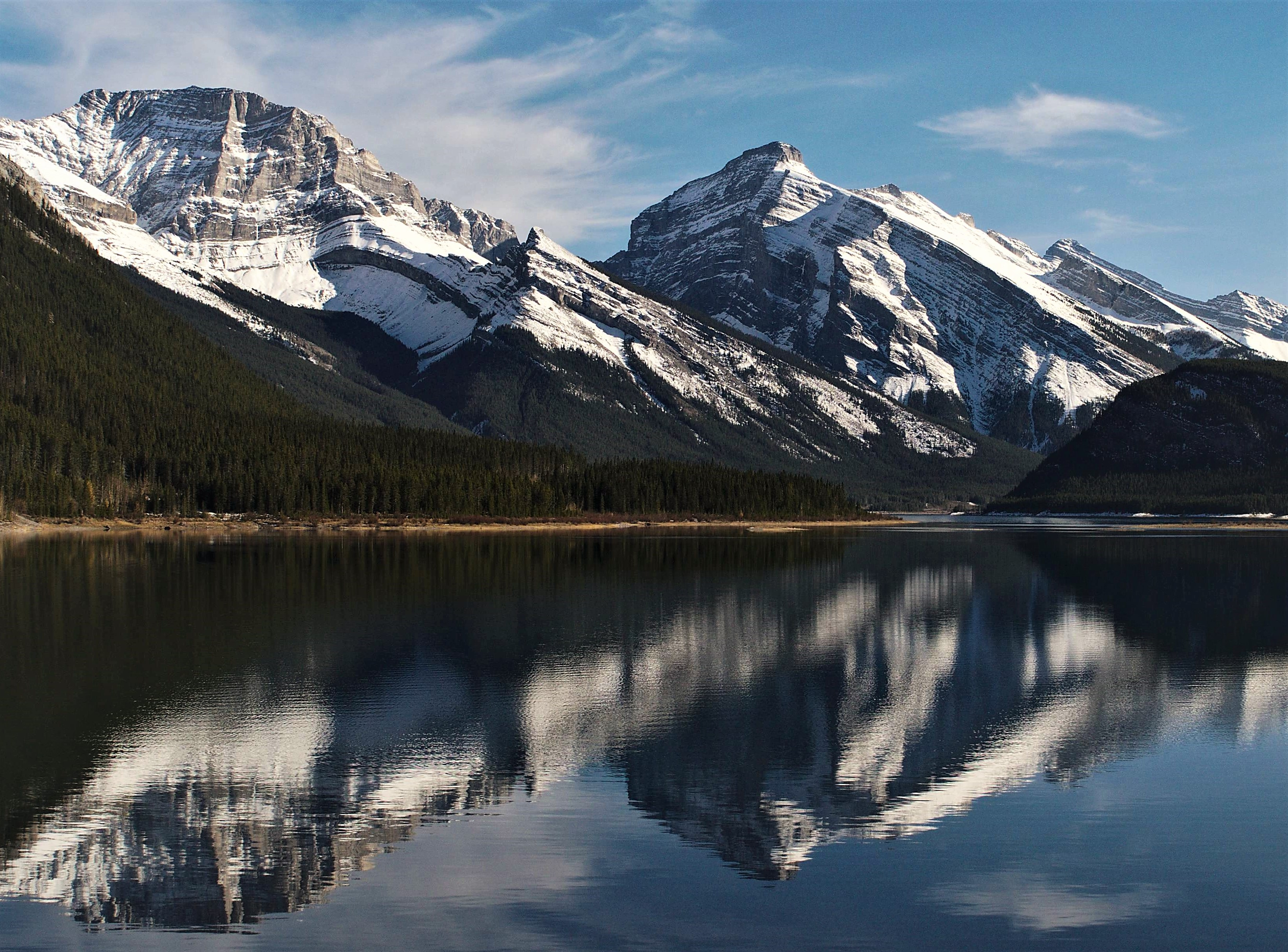
Mount Lougheed (left) and Mount Sparrowhawk

== See also ==
- Mountains of Alberta
- Geography of Alberta
