= Spray Mountains =

Mountain range in Alberta, Canada

- Spray Range
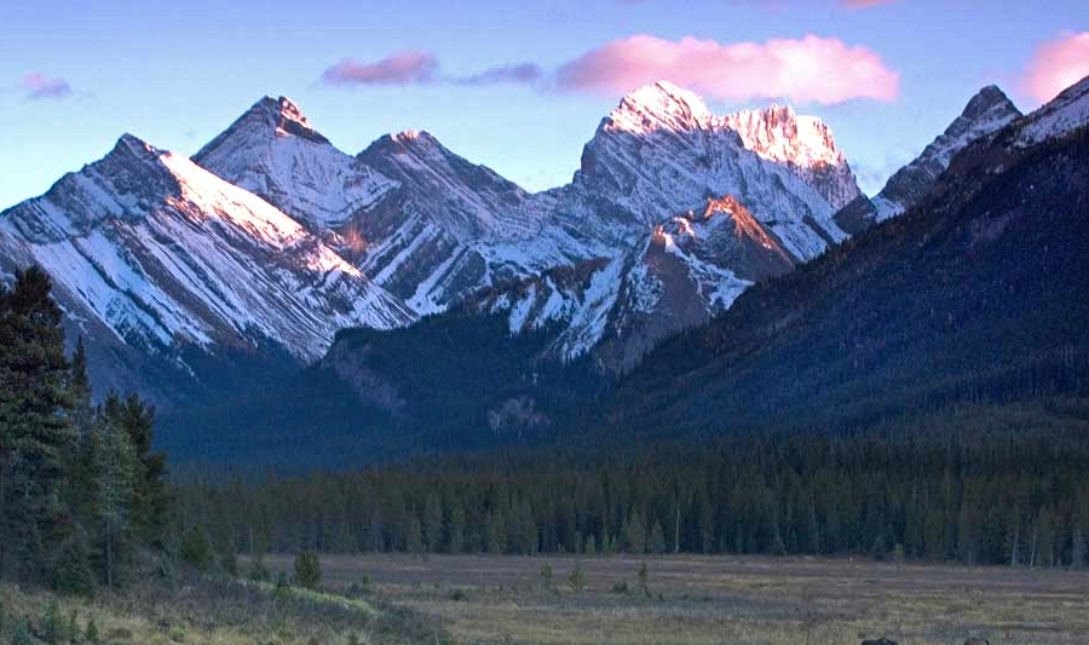
- Mount French (right of center under cloud) seen from the north. Mount Murray to left of center.

Highest point
- Peak: Mount Sir Douglas
- Elevation: 3,406 m (11,175 ft)
- Listing: Ranges of the Canadian Rockies
- Coordinates: 50°43′21″N 115°20′20″W

Geography
- Location within Alberta Location within Canada
- Country: Canada
- Province: Alberta
- Range coordinates: 50°43′45″N 115°18′20″W
- Parent range: Canadian Rockies
- Topo map: 83C/13

The Spray Mountains is a mountain range of the Canadian Rockies located in southwestern Alberta, Canada.

== List of mountains ==
This range includes the following mountains and peaks:

Mountain / Peak	Elevation		Prominence		FA	Coordinates
Mountain / Peak	m	ft	m	ft	FA	Coordinates
Mount Sir Douglas	3,406	11,175	1,110	3,640	1919	50°43′21″N 115°20′20″W
Mount French	3,244	10,643	470	1,540	1921	50°43′45″N 115°18′20″W
Mount Robertson	3,177	10,423	281	922	1928	50°43′34″N 115°19′16″W
Mount Smith-Dorrien	3,155	10,351	225	738	1933	50°43′55″N 115°17′25″W
Mount Birdwood	3,097	10,161	735	2,411	1922	50°47′7″N 115°22′5″W
Mount Jellicoe	3,075	10,089	179	587	1922	50°42′52″N 115°17′20″W
Mount Maude	3,043	9,984	330	1,080	Unk	50°42′2.9″N 115°18′10.8″W
Mount Murray	3,026	9,928	313	1,027	Unk	50°44′57″N 115°17′35″W
Mount Black Prince	2,939	9,642	239	784	1956	50°41′43″N 115°14′41″W
Mount Smuts	2,938	9,639	591	1,939	Unk	50°48′28″N 115°23′13″W
Mount Warspite	2,850	9,350	240	790	Unk	50°40′52″N 115°12′59″W
Pigs Tail	2,822	9,259				
Snow Peak	2,789	9,150	312	1,024	Unk	50°46′21″N 115°23′9″W
Mount Shark	2,786	9,140	134	440	Unk	50°49′41″N 115°24′36″W
Cegnfs	2,785	9,137				
Commonwealth Peak	2,775	9,104	215	705	1970	50°47′25″N 115°20′55″W
Mount Burstall	2,760	9,060	245	804	1972	50°46′10″N 115°19′31″W
Mount Invincible	2,700	8,900	140	460	1957	50°39′50″N 115°11′27″W
Mount Indefatigable	2,670	8,760	198	650	1901	50°39′12″N 115°10′19″W
Mount Nomad	2,544	8,346	185	607	Unk	50°39′48″N 115°12′38″W
