= Mount Sir Douglas =

Mountain in the country of Canada

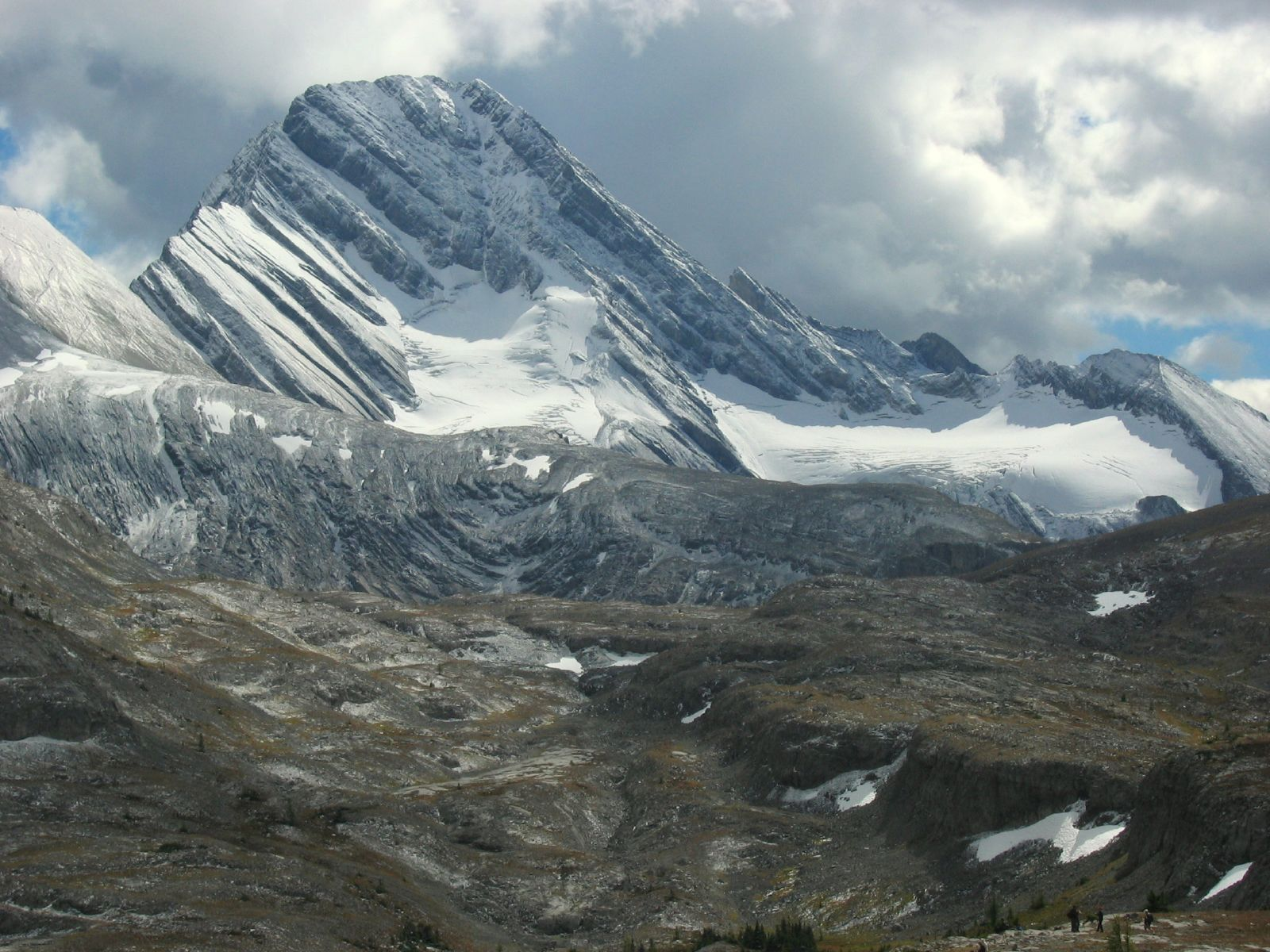

Highest point
- Elevation: 3,406 m (11,175 ft)
- Prominence: 1,110 m (3,640 ft)
- Parent peak: Mount Joffre (3433 m)
- Listing: Mountains of Alberta; Mountains of British Columbia
- Coordinates: 50°43′21″N 115°20′20″W

Geography
- Location within Alberta Location within British Columbia Location within Canada
- Country: Canada
- Provinces: Alberta and British Columbia
- Protected areas: Banff National Park; Height of the Rockies Provincial Park
- Parent range: Spray Mountains; Park Ranges; Canadian Rockies
- Topo map: NTS 82J11 Kananaskis Lakes

Climbing
- First ascent: 1919 J.W.A. Hickson and Edward Feuz Jr.
- Easiest route: North-West Face III

Mount Sir Douglas is located on the border of Alberta and British Columbia on the Continental Divide, at the northern end of Height of the Rockies Provincial Park and east of Invermere. It is Alberta's 18th highest peak, and 28th prominence mountain as well as British Columbia's 28th highest peak. It was named in 1916 by interprovincial boundary surveyors after Field Marshal Sir Douglas Haig.

== Geology ==
Mount Sir Douglas is composed of sedimentary rock laid down during the Precambrian to Jurassic periods. Formed in shallow seas, this sedimentary rock was pushed east and over the top of younger rock during the Laramide orogeny.

== Climate ==
Based on the Köppen climate classification, Mount Sir Douglas is located in a subarctic climate zone with cold, snowy winters, and mild summers. Temperatures can drop below −20 C with wind chill factors below −30 C.

== See also ==
- List of mountains in the Canadian Rockies
- List of peaks on the Alberta–British Columbia border
