= Scrambles in the Canadian Rockies =

1991 climbing guidebook

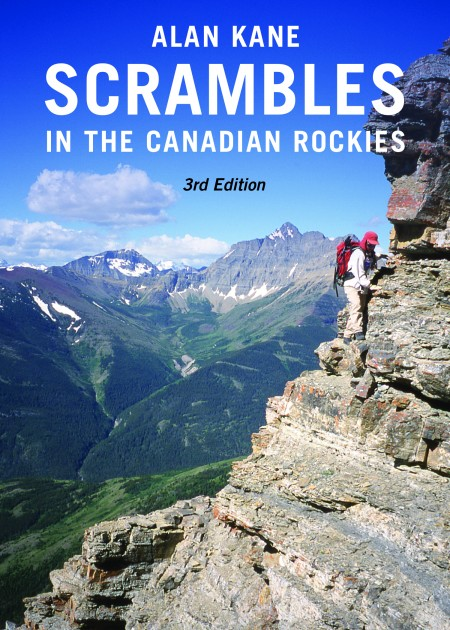
- Author: Alan Kane
- Subject: Climbing
- Published: 1991 Rocky Mountain Books; 2016 (third ed.)
- Publication place: Canada
- ISBN: 9781771600972 (third ed.)

Scrambles in the Canadian Rockies is a climbing guidebook by Alan Kane describing scrambling routes of mountains in the Canadian Rockies.

It is published by Rocky Mountain Books, located in Calgary, Alberta. The third edition ISBN 9781771600972, released in May 2016, has been updated and contains route descriptions for 175 peaks. The peaks are rated from easy to difficult and information on trail heads and the standard routes are covered. Backpacker magazine has twice featured the book as an expedition guide. The Canadian Alpine Journal referred to it as a "scree gospel". The book is solely responsible for creating a widespread interest in scrambling up mountain peaks, whether the peaks are in USA or Western Canada. Since first published in 1991, many similar guidebooks by other authors have followed this one.
