= Mount Birdwood =

Mountain in Alberta, Canada

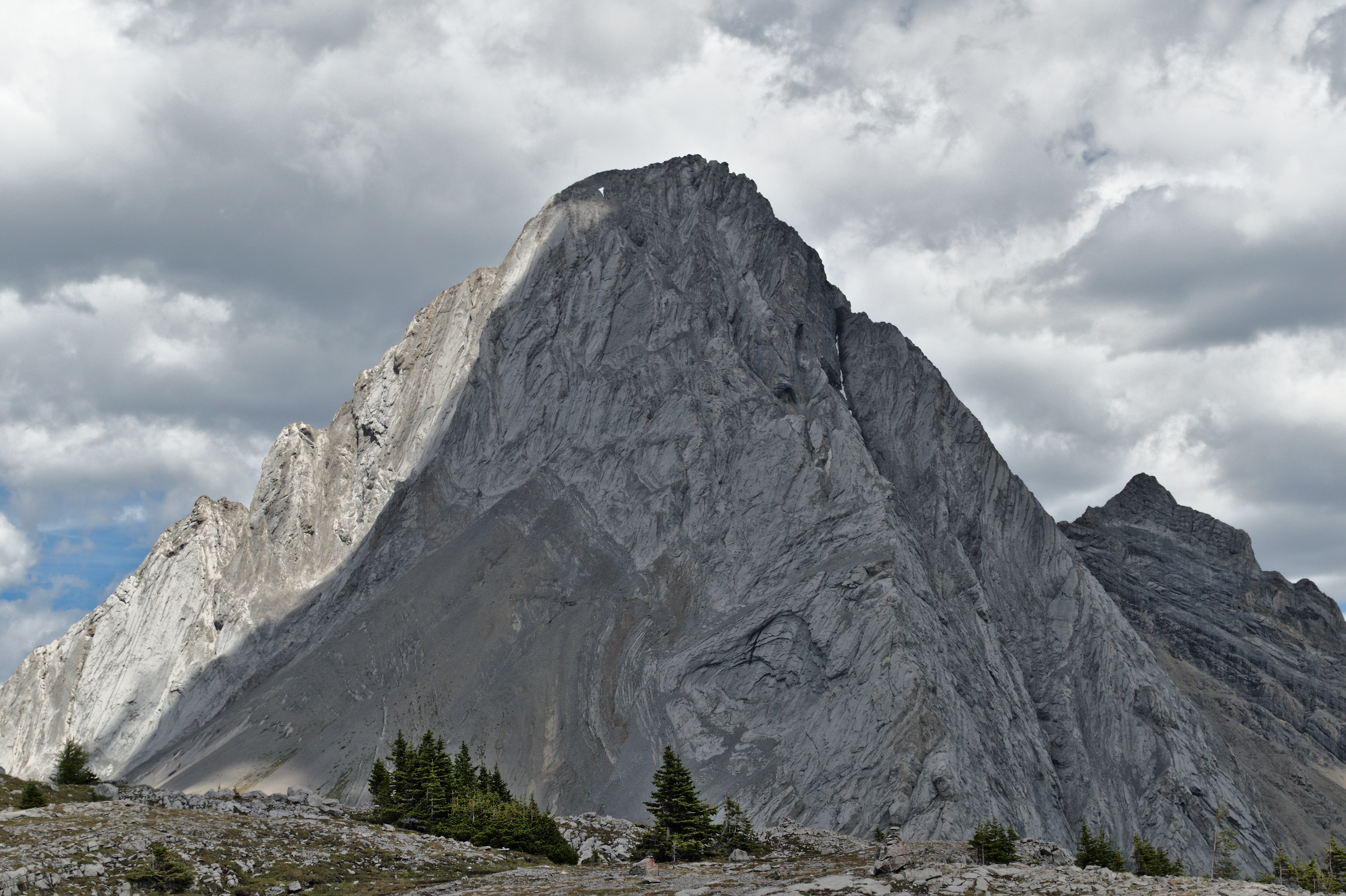
- Mt. Birdwood from Burstall pass

Highest point
- Elevation: 3,097 m (10,161 ft)
- Prominence: 735 m (2,411 ft)
- Listing: Mountains of Alberta
- Coordinates: 50°47′07″N 115°22′05″W

Geography
- Location within Alberta Location within Canada
- Country: Canada
- Province: Alberta
- Parent range: Spray Mountains; Canadian Rockies
- Topo map: NTS 82J14 Spray Lakes Reservoir

Climbing
- First ascent: 1922 by C.F. Hogeboom, F.N. Waterman, Rudolph Aemmer.

Mount Birdwood is a 3,097-metre (10,161-foot) summit in the Spray Mountains range of the Canadian Rockies in Alberta, Canada. The mountain is situated on the east boundary of Banff National Park in the upper Spray Lakes River Valley.

== History ==
Named in 1919, Mount Birdwood honors Lieutenant General Sir William R. Birdwood, General Officer commanding (GOC) the Australian Imperial Force (AIF) in France. The mountain's name became official in 1928 by the Geographical Names Board of Canada. The first ascent was made in 1922 by C.F. Hogeboom, F.N. Waterman, and Rudolph Aemmer.

== Geology ==
Mount Birdwood is composed of sedimentary rock laid down during the Precambrian to Jurassic periods. Formed in shallow seas, this sedimentary rock was pushed east and over the top of younger rock during the Laramide orogeny.

== Climate ==
Based on the Köppen climate classification, Mount Birdwood is located in a subarctic climate with cold, snowy winters, and mild summers. Winter temperatures can drop below −20 °C with wind chill factors below −30 °C. Precipitation runoff from the mountain drains into tributaries of the Spray River which is a tributary of the Bow River.

== Gallery ==
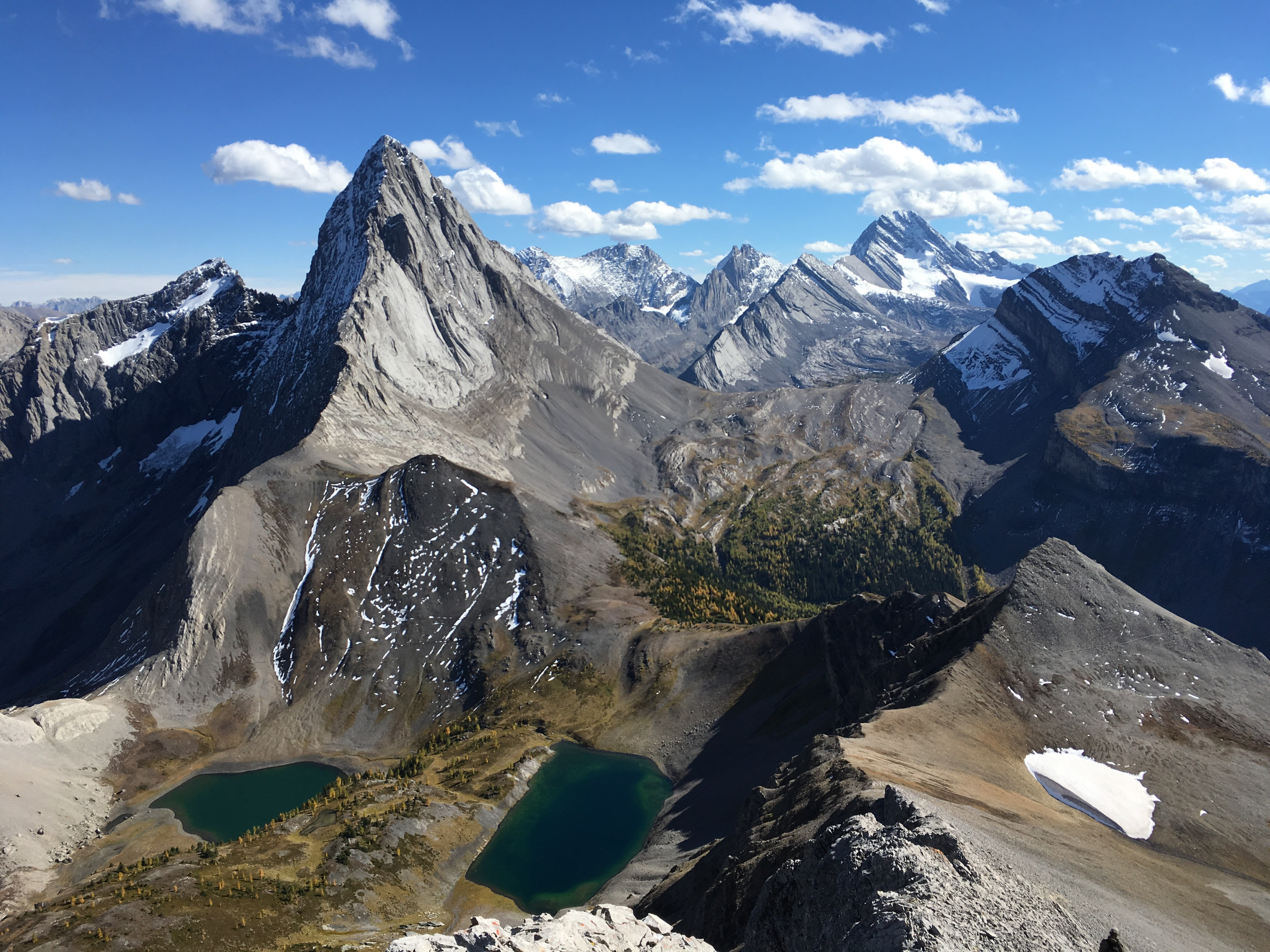
Mt. Birdwood and the Birdwood Lakes, as seen from Smutwood Peak

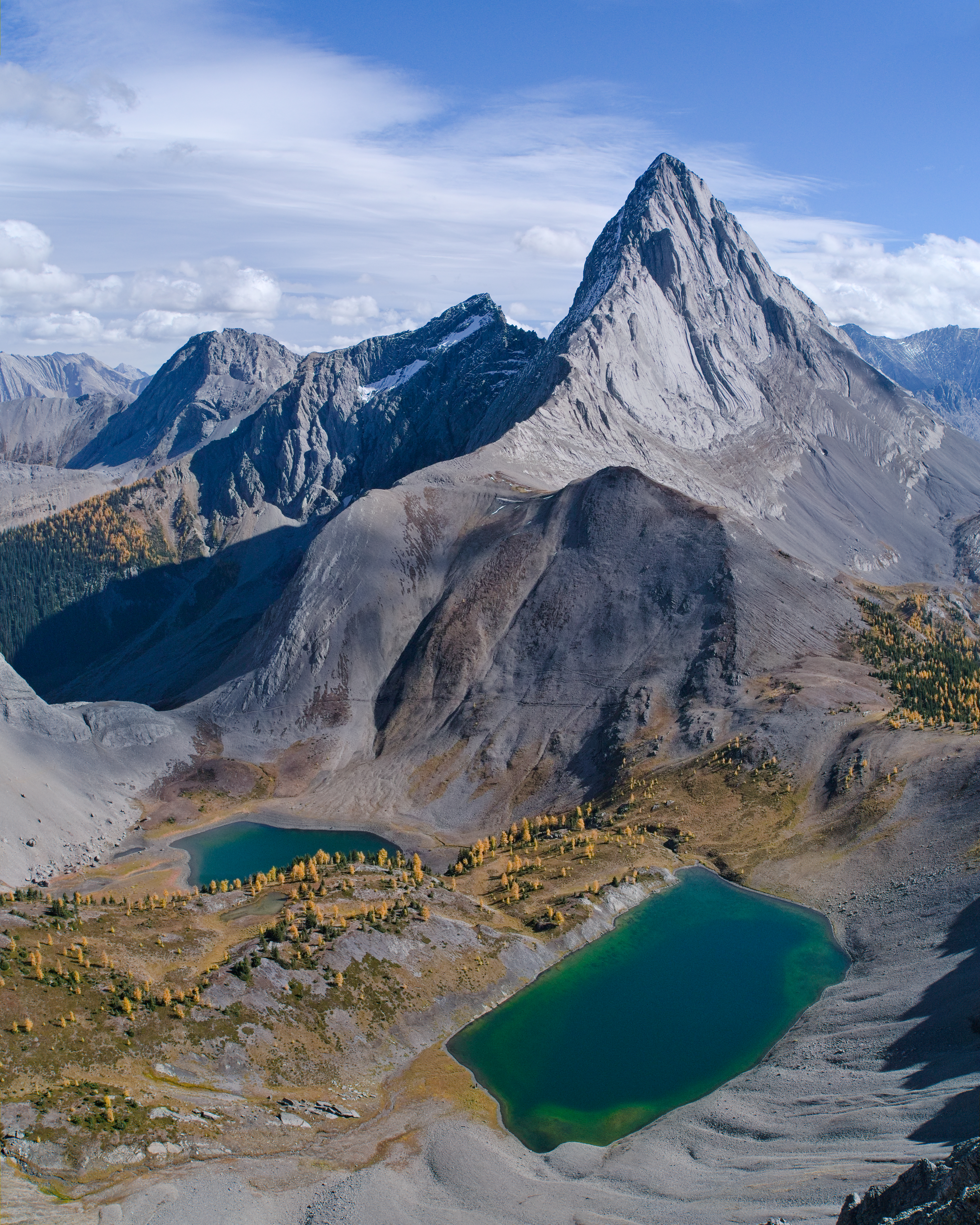
Mt. Birdwood and the Birdwood Lakes

== See also ==
- Alberta's Rockies
- Geology of the Rocky Mountains
- List of mountains in the Canadian Rockies
