= Kananaskis River =

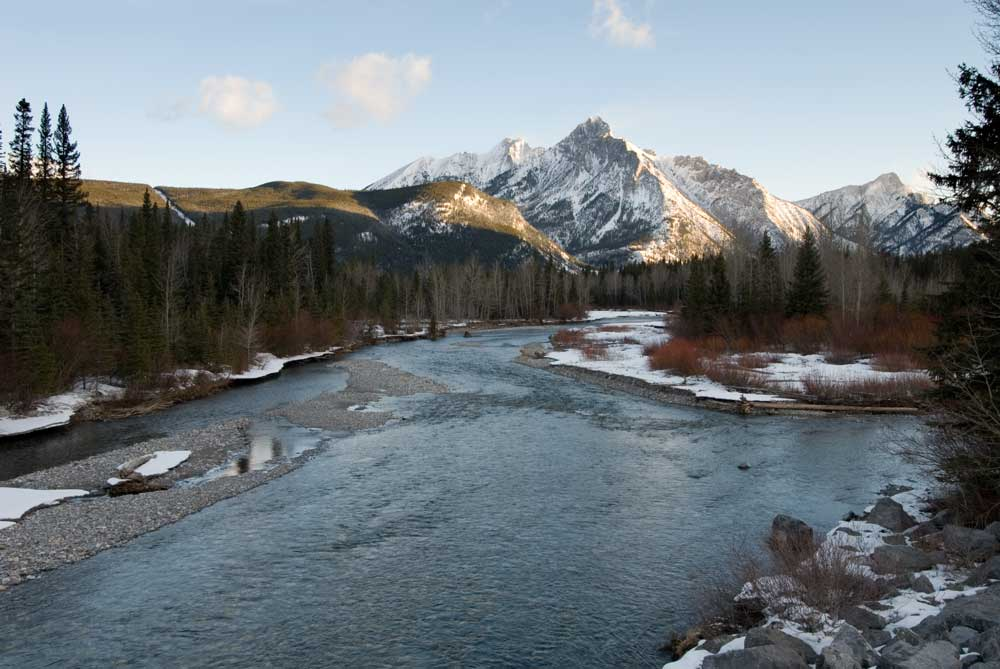
- Kananaskis River

Location
- Country: Canada
- Province: Alberta

Physical characteristics
- Source
  - location: Peter Lougheed Provincial Park
  - coordinates: 50.72803°N 115.28457°W
  - elevation: 2,720 meters (8,920 ft)
- Mouth
  - location: Bow River
  - coordinates: 51.09465°N 115.06190°W
  - elevation: 1,315 meters (4,314 ft)
- Length: 74 km (46 mi)

The Kananaskis River (/ˌkænəˈnæskɪs/, Stoney Ozade Îmne Wapta) is a mountain river in western Alberta, Canada. It is a tributary of the Bow River, crossing much of the length of the northern section of Kananaskis Country.

== Names ==
The name of the river used in English was given by John Palliser in 1858, who named it after a Cree person.

In the Stoney language, according to the Stoney Nakoda elders Walter Simeon and Wallace Ear, the river takes its name from the Upper and Lower Kananaskis Lakes: in Stoney these are together called Ozade Îmne ("y-shaped-fork lake"), and the river that flows through them is called Ozade Îmne Wapta ("y-shaped-fork lake river"). The name refers to the y-shaped confluence of the Kananaskis and Bow rivers.

== Course ==
The Kananaskis originates in the Canadian Rockies, east of the continental divide, in Peter Lougheed Provincial Park. It flows southeast to the Upper Kananaskis Lake, then turns north into the Lower Kananaskis Lake. From here it has a northbound course on the border of Spray Valley Provincial Park and Elbow-Sheep Wildland Provincial Park, where the Kananaskis Trail follows its itinerary. The lower course flows through Bow Valley Provincial Park, where Barrier Lake is formed along the river. Barrier Lake is an artificial lake used for hydroelectric power generation. The Kananaskis merges into the Bow River at Seebe, 30 km east of Canmore.

The Kananaskis River has a total length of 74 kilometers (46 mi).

The river contains three hydroelectric dams, each of which contains a powerhouse. The Pocaterra Hydroelectric Facility involves a 1.5-kilometre penstock to increase the hydraulic head and therefore the amount of electricity it generates.

Dams on the Kananaskis River
Name	Height	Capacity (MW)	Year built	Impounds	Owner
Interlakes Dam	20 m	5	1955	Upper Kananaskis Lake	TransAlta
Pocaterra Dam	8 m	15	1955	Lower Kananaskis Lake	TransAlta
Barrier Dam	18 m	12	1949	Barrier Lake	TransAlta

== Recreation ==
Many hiking trails are found along the upper course of the river. Canoeing, kayaking, and rafting are also popular activities on the lower Kananaskis, with tours starting from Canmore or Banff.

=== Lower Kananaskis River description ===
For whitewater enthusiasts looking to run friendly class II(III) whitewater, the Lower Kananaskis is a popular choice. As the river is dam-controlled, the water levels are predictable, and TransAlta generally posts the release times and flow rates.

The Canoe Meadows site is home to the popular Kananaskis Whitewater Festival ("Kanfest"). This is an annual festival, typically in mid-August, which attracts beginner and expert kayakers alike.

The Upper Kananaskis (upstream of Barrier Lake) is not so paddler friendly: low water levels, many snags and sweepers.

==== Shuttle ====
- The put-in for the Lower Kananaskis is the parking lot for "Widow Maker" Rapid, approximately 1 kilometre upstream of the Kananaskis Information Centre.
- The take-out for the Lower Kananaskis is Canoe Meadows Campground, approximately 1 kilometre downstream of the Kananaskis Information Centre

==== Rapids ====
The first rapid on the Kananaskis is the Widow Maker, which is a class III pool drop that is notoriously tippy. It is easy to put in below the Widow Maker if the paddler is looking to avoid the feature. The first play feature is a small hole on river left called Hollywood. The river then winds down with man-made eddies on either side of the river to the second feature called point-break, which is considered the river's best hole for playboating. Downstream is the river's largest wave, called Santa Claus, with an aggressive hole 30 yards below it (dubbed "Santa's Little Helper"). The section finishes off with Canoe Meadows Campground on the right hand shore, with a large "V" wave popular with river surfers, a second wave called the Green Tongue, and a very developed slalom course. Nearly every rapid on this stretch of river was either created or manipulated by man-made boulder placements. The exit of the river to get back to the take-out is anywhere on the right hand shore after the last slalom gate.

A major flood beginning on June 21, 2013, had a destructive effect on the man-made rapids on the lower Kananaskis River. Very few of them are still considered suitable for playboating, partially due to movement of boulders, and partially due to inconsistent water levels. Soon after, the Alberta Whitewater Association reconstructed an interim slalom course, with plans to improve it further with additional time and funding.

== See also ==
- List of rivers of Alberta
