= Lower Kananaskis Lake =

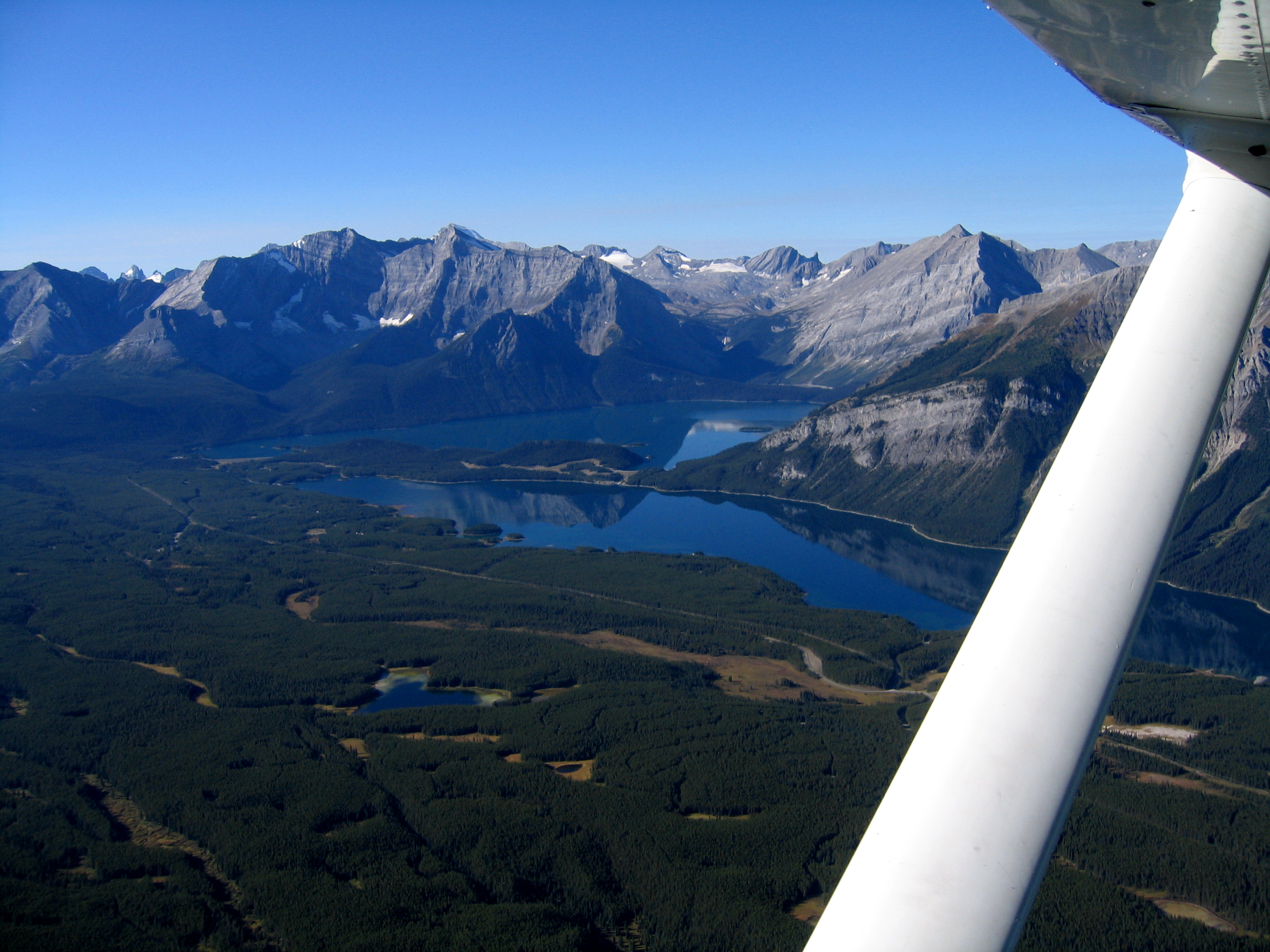
- Lower and Upper Kananaskis Lakes

- Location in Alberta Lower Kananaskis Lake (Canada)
- Location: Kananaskis, Alberta
- Coordinates: 50°39′22″N 115°08′13″W
- Type: reservoir
- Primary inflows: Upper Kananaskis River
- Primary outflows: Kananaskis River
- Basin countries: Canada
- Max. length: 8 km (5 mi)
- Max. width: 1.3 km (0.81 mi)
- Surface elevation: 1,680 m (5,510 ft)

Lower Kananaskis Lake (Stoney Ozade Îmne) is a natural lake that was turned into a reservoir in Kananaskis Country in Alberta, Canada.

Lower Kananaskis Lake is in Peter Lougheed Provincial Park along with the Upper Kananaskis Lake.

The lake is part of a series of natural and man made reservoirs in the Kananaskis and Bow Valleys used for hydro electric power, flood control, and water reserves for the Bow River water users such as the city of Calgary.

The lake is also used for recreational activities, with hiking paths surrounding the lake (and cross-country skiing trails in the winter).

== Names ==
In the Stoney language, the upper and lower Kananaskis lakes are known together as Ozade Îmne, meaning "y-shaped-fork lake". According to the Stoney Nakoda elders Walter Simeon and Wallace Ear, the name refers to the y-shaped confluence of the Kananaskis and Bow rivers.

== Camping ==
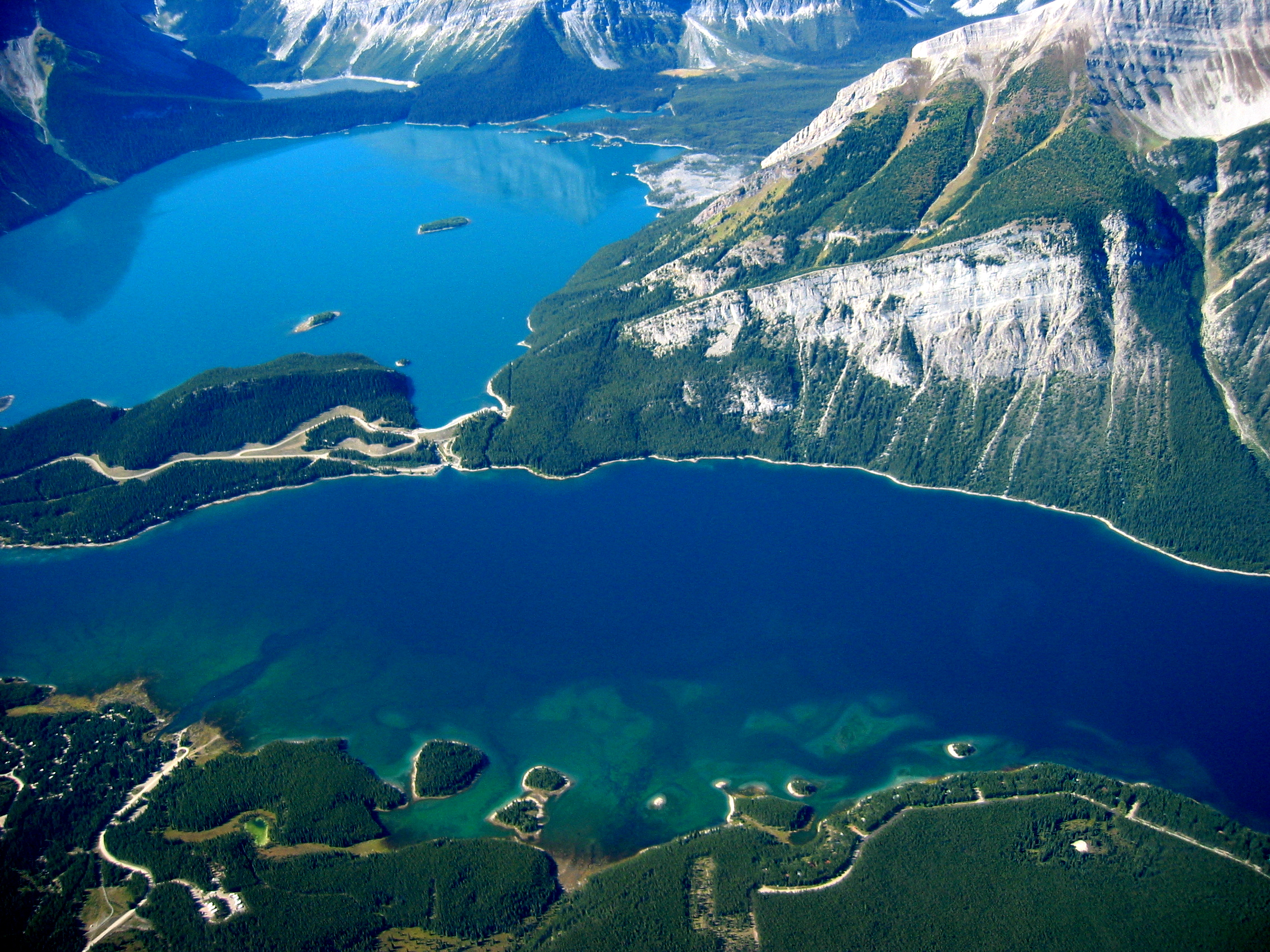
Upper and Lower Kananaskis Lakes

Several campgrounds are located along Kananaskis Lake. Canyon Campground does not have camping spots backing on to the lake, but a lakeside picnic area is available. Lower Lakes Campground does not have spots backing on to shores of Lower Kananaskis Lake either. A network of bicycle trails connects the campgrounds and picnic areas. Most of the year, these are open to the public, but they are closed sometimes due to bears presence in the area. Interlakes Campground is the highest lying campground, and lakeside spots for this campground are available.
