= Peter Lougheed Provincial Park =

Provincial park in Alberta, Canada

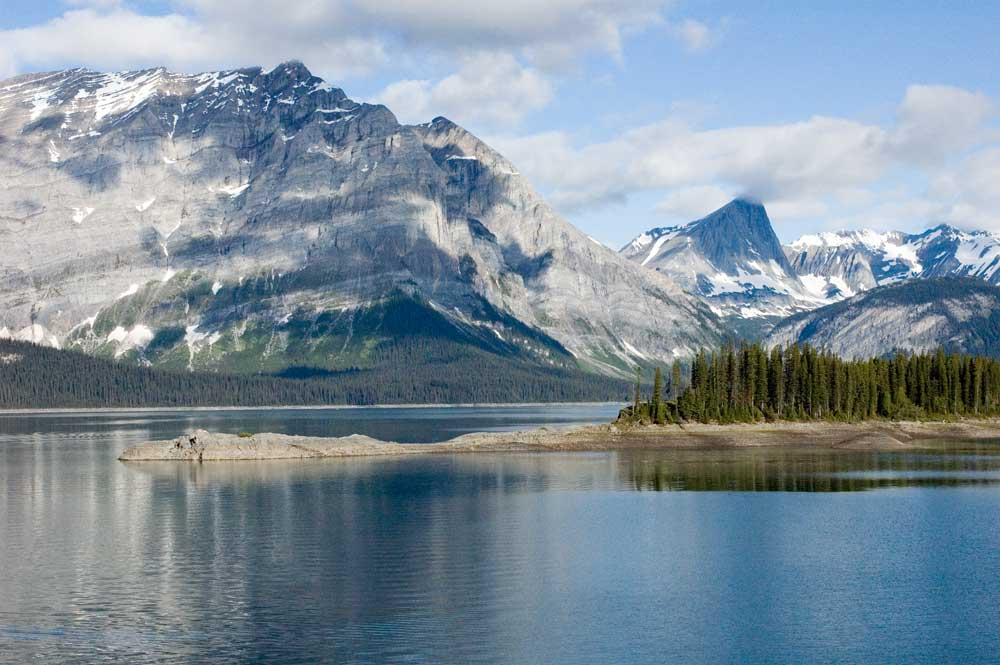
- Upper Kananaskis Lake in Peter Lougheed Provincial Park

- Location within Alberta
- Interactive map of Peter Lougheed Provincial Park
- Location: Kananaskis, Alberta, Canada
- Nearest city: Calgary, Canmore
- Coordinates: 50°41′58″N 115°11′16″W
- Area: 304 km^{2} (117 sq mi)
- Established: September 22, 1977
- Governing body: Alberta Tourism, Parks and Recreation
- Website: https://www.albertaparks.ca/parks/kananaskis/peter-lougheed-pp/

Peter Lougheed Provincial Park is in Kananaskis Country about 90 kilometres (56 mi) west of Calgary, along the Kananaskis Trail in Alberta, Canada.

This park is within Alberta's Rocky Mountains. The park was originally named Kananaskis Provincial Park, but was renamed after Peter Lougheed, premier of Alberta from 1971 to 1985, when he retired in 1986.

One of the largest provincial parks in Alberta, it encompasses 304 square kilometres (117 mi^{2}) around Kananaskis Lakes. The park provides amenities for camping and fishing along with trails for hiking, mountain biking, horseback riding and cross-country skiing. There are six vehicular access campgrounds and six backcountry campgrounds in the park.

Wildlife living in Peter Lougheed Provincial Park include grizzly bears, black bears, elk, deer, moose, bighorn sheep, cougars, lynx, northern Rocky Mountain wolves and the occasional mountain goat.

Some of the most popular backpacking trips in Kananaskis Country are in Peter Lougheed Provincial Park. The Northover Ridge is a two-to-four-day backpacking trip, as is the North and South Kananaskis Pass.

== History ==
Prior to European contact, the area that is now Peter Lougheed Provincial Park, was home to many Indigenous Peoples including the Stoney-Nakoda, Kootenai, Siksika, Kainai, Peigan, and Tsuut’ina people.

Much of the land currently within the park was previously part of Rocky Mountains National Park, but was removed in 1911, and eventually turned over to the Government of Alberta. The land was developed in numerous ways, with hydroelectric dams being constructed in the modern park boundaries.

By the 1970s, the eastern slopes of the Rockies faced more pressure as people from Calgary searched for recreation outside of the city. Key people in creating the park were Bill Milne, a Calgary architect and environmentalist and Alberta Highways Minister and area MLA Clarence Copithorne. Clarence Copithorne was a rancher and planned to upgrade the road access into the Kananaskis Valley to direct people away from ranch-lands. Bill Milne challenged the provincial government to consult the public about the highway upgrade, and a resulting survey showed public support for a large protected area. Legend says Premier Lougheed created the park after a single helicopter flight over the area arranged by Milne and Copithorne. The park was dedicated on September 22, 1978.

== Facilities ==
The park has seven automobile accessible campgrounds, totaling 546 campsites, as well as six backcountry campgrounds, with a total of 83 sites. There are over 12 km of paved bike paths connecting the auto access campgrounds, and many more hiking trails. Boulton Creek Trading Post is the main source for supplies in the park, as well as Fortress Junction, just north of the park.

== Activities ==
The following activities are available in the park:

- Camping and backcountry camping (May to August, permit required)
- Canoeing, kayaking, power boating, sailing, windsurfing
- Cross-country skiing (on Boulton Creek, Elk Pass, Little Highwood, Highwood Meadows, Hydroline, Lodgepole, Lookout, Pocaterra, Ptarmigan Cirque, Rolly Road, Upper Kananaskis Lake, Wheeler and Whiskeyjack trails)
- Fishing and ice fishing
- Front country hiking (trails include Black Prince Cirque, Boulton Creek, Burstall Pass, "Canadian Mt. Everest Expedition", Chester Lake, Elbow Lake, Elk Pass, Hydroline, Kananaskis Canyon, Lodgepole, Lookout, Lower Kananaskis Lake, Marl Lake, Maude-Lawson Lakes, Pocaterra, Ptarmigan Cirque, Rawson Lake, Rock Glacier, Rolly Road, Smith-Dorien, Three Isle Lake and Upper Kananaskis Lake trails)
- Mountain biking (on Burstall Pass, Chester Lake, Elbow Lake trail, Elk Pass, Hydroline, Lookout, Pocaterra, Rolly Road, Smith-Dorien, Three Isle Lake, Wheeler and Whiskeyjack trails)
- Horseback riding (on Elbow Lake trail)
- Snowshoeing
- Climbing

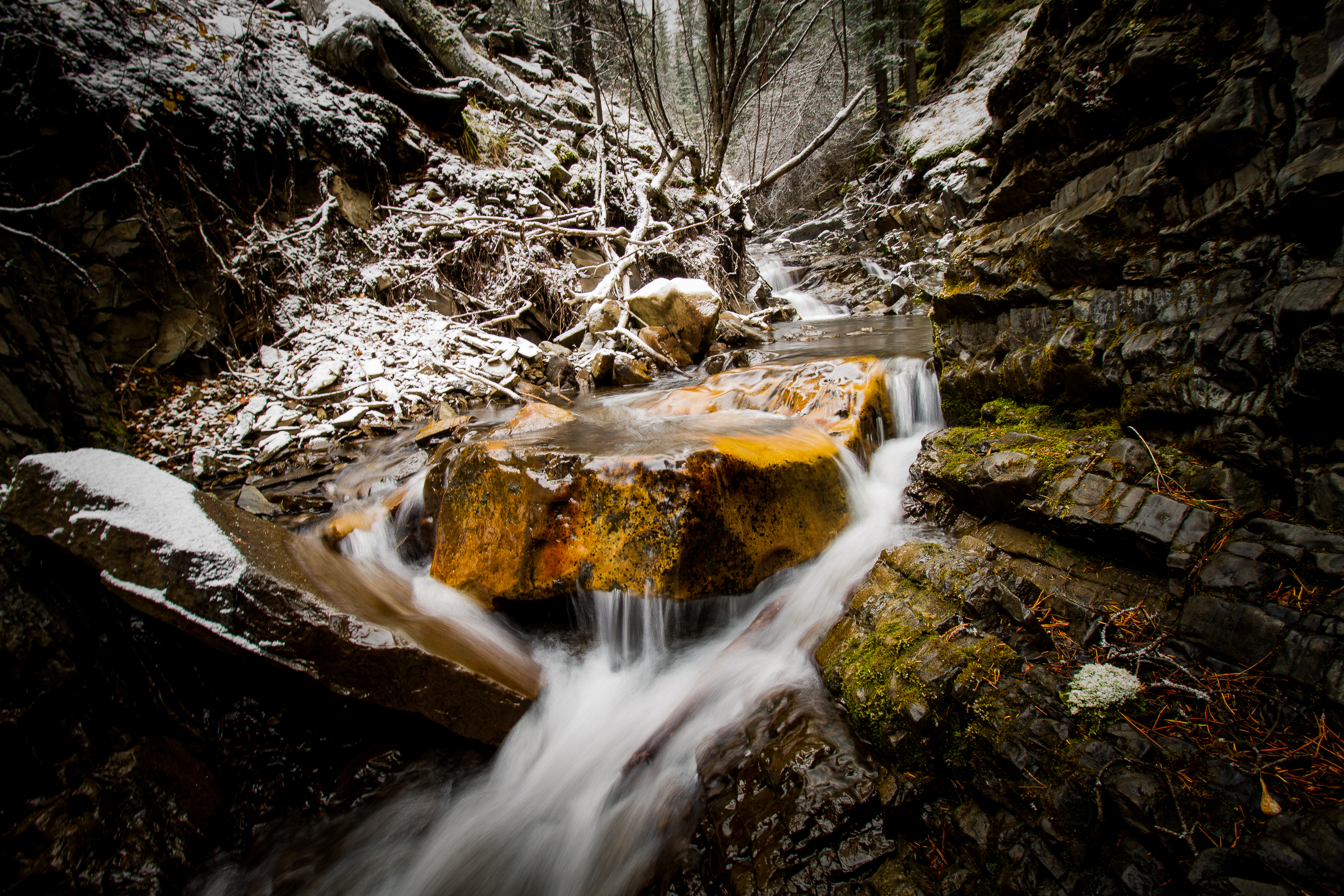
A long exposure photograph of a small waterfall along Elpoca Creek during winter

== See also ==
- List of provincial parks in Alberta
- List of Canadian protected areas
- List of national parks of Canada
