= Bluerock Wildland Provincial Park =

Protected area in southwestern Alberta, Canada

- IUCN category Ib (wilderness area)
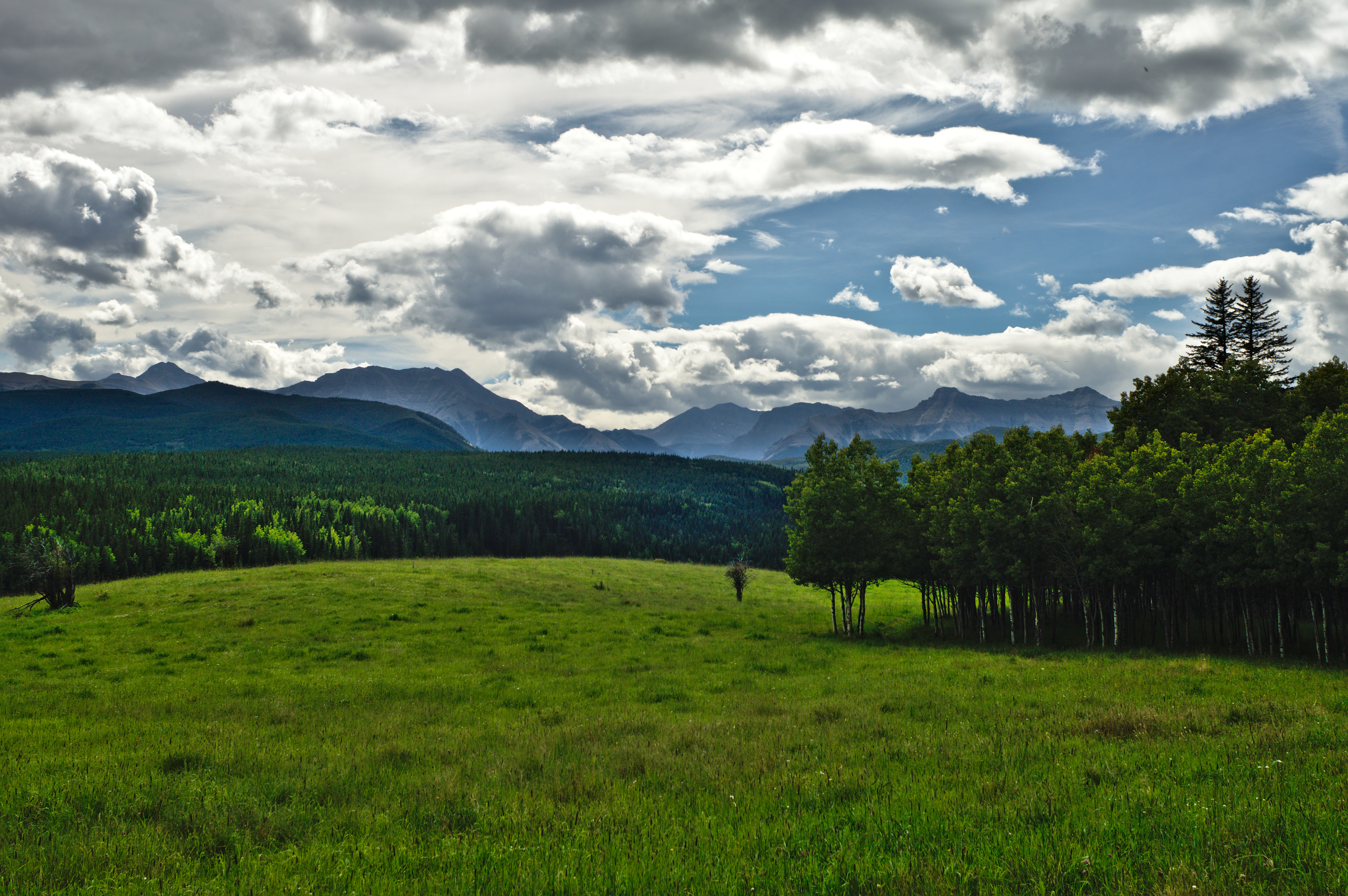
- Bighorn Lookout

- Location within Alberta Location within Canada Location within Kananaskis Improvement District
- Interactive map of Bluerock Wildland Provincial Park
- Location: Kananaskis, Alberta
- Nearest town: Turner Valley, Alberta
- Coordinates: 50°38′33″N 114°39′16″W
- Area: 12,719.59 ha (49.1106 sq mi)
- Established: 24 July 2001
- Governing body: Alberta Forestry, Parks and Tourism

Bluerock Wildland Provincial Park is a wildland provincial park located in Kananaskis Improvement District, Alberta, Canada. It was established on 24 July 2001 and has an area of 12,719.59 hectares (31,430.79 acres; 49.11 sq mi). The park was named for the Bluerock Creek that flows through and forms part of the western boundary of the park and Bluerock Mountain which is the creek's source. The park is included in the South Saskatchewan Region land use framework and administered by the South Saskatchewan Regional Plan. Sheep River Provincial Park and Bluerock Wildland Provincial Park are managed under the same Management Plan.

Source of the names of Bluerock Wildland Provincial Park
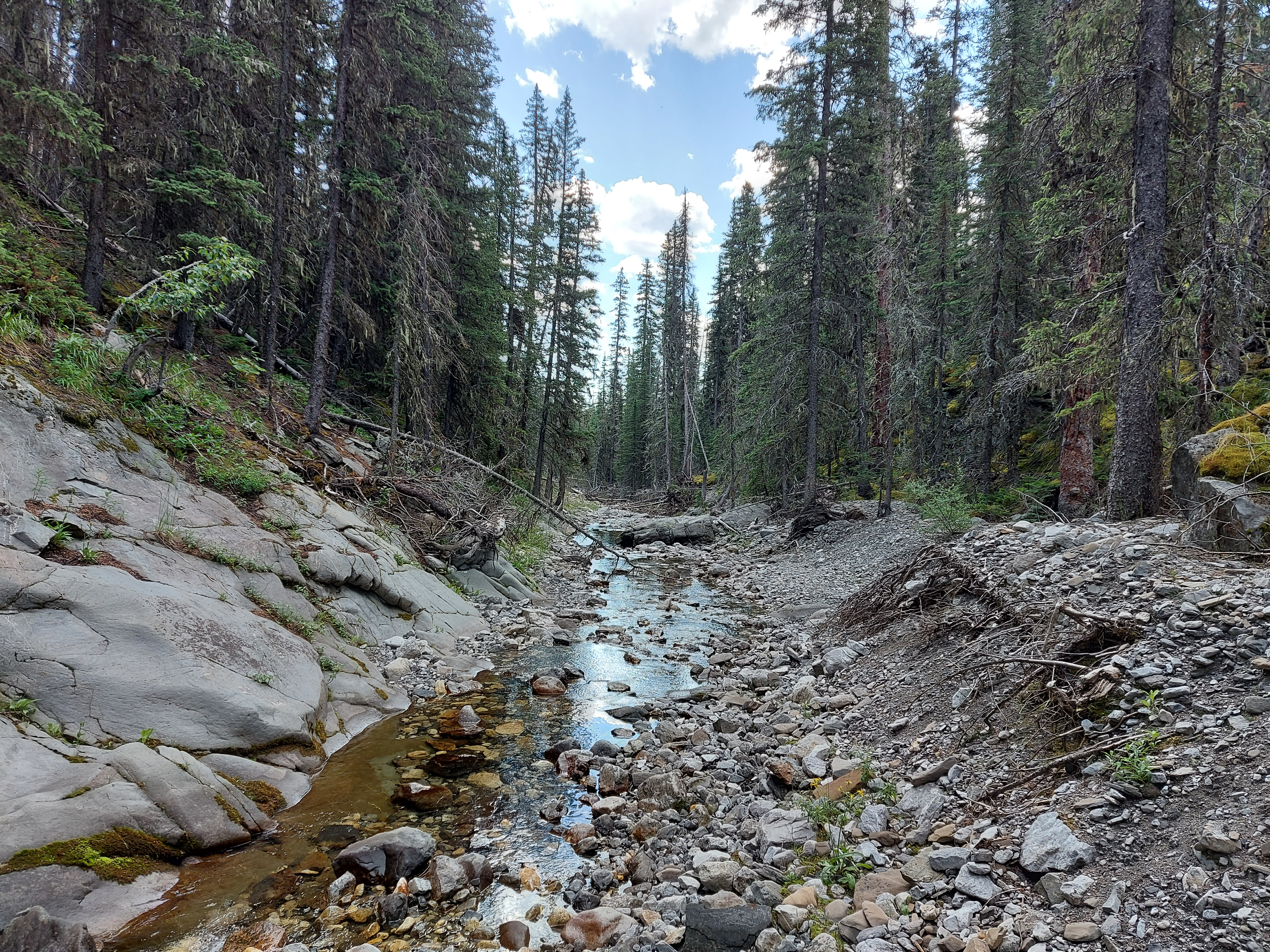
Bluerock Creek

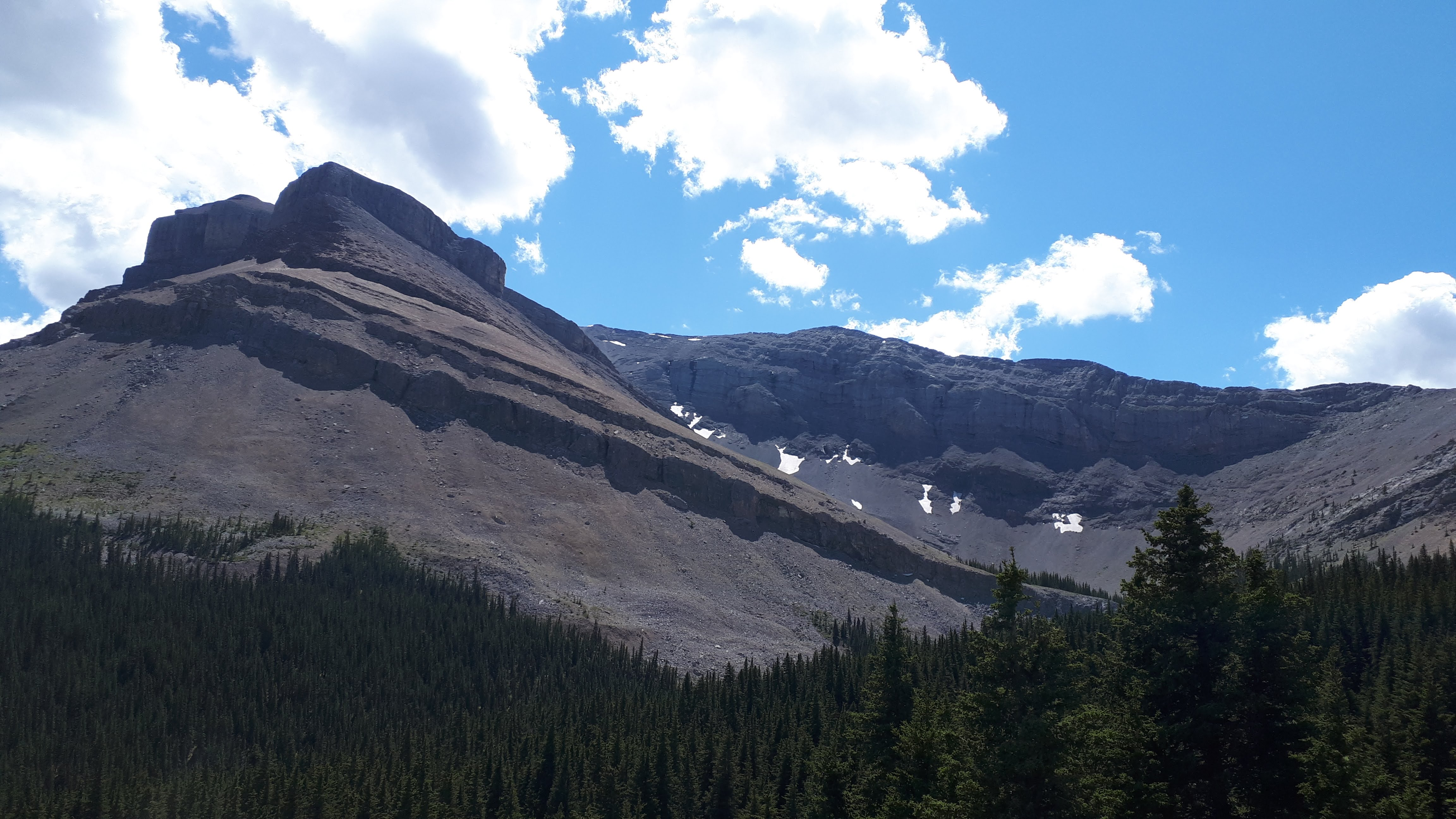
Bluerock Mountain

== Location ==
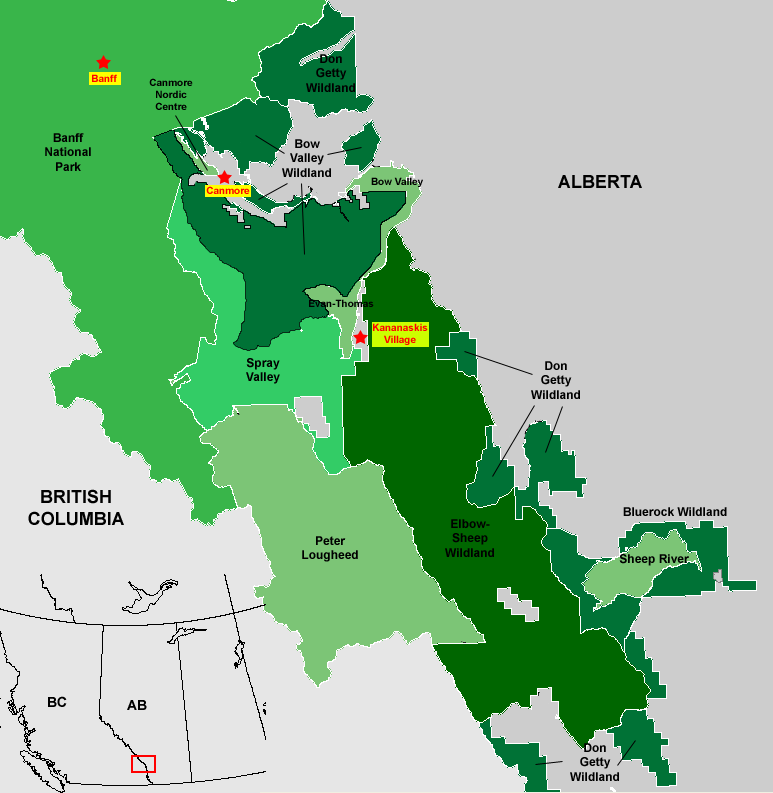
Kananaskis Park System

The park is located 15 kilometres (9.3 mi) west of Turner Valley along Alberta Highway 546. The park surrounds Sheep River Provincial Park and adjoins Elbow-Sheep Wildland Provincial Park on the western boundary. It also touches Don Getty Wildland Provincial Park on the northwest and southwest. On the north, south and east, the park abuts the Rocky Mountains Forest Reserve and the Kananaskis Country Forest Land Use Zone. It is part of the Kananaskis Country park system.

Alberta Highway 546, the main access to the park, is closed from 1 December to 15 May each year west of the Sandy McNabb Recreation Area. The closure also occurs on the other road access point at Gorge Creek in the north of the park. This closure provides an important winter range for Rocky Mountain Bighorn Sheep and other wildlife.

== Ecology ==
The park protects the Sheep River watershed and extends ecological preservation from the Elbow-Sheep Wildland Provincial Park to the eastern boundary of Kananaskis Country. It connects Sheep River Provincial Park with the other provincial and national parks along the eastern slope of the Rocky Mountains. The park contains the Alpine, Sub-Alpine and Montane subregions of the Rocky Mountain Natural Region and provides a transition zone between the Rocky Mountain and Foothills Natural Regions. The western end of the park contains the Alpine subregion while the central and eastern sections contain the sub-alpine and montane subregions; separated largely by elevation. In the National Ecological Framework for Canada used by Environment and Climate Change Canada, the eastern portion of the park is in the Bragg Creek Foothills ecodistrict of the Western Alberta Upland ecoregion of the Boreal Foothills ecoprovince of the Boreal Plains ecozone. The western portion of the park is in the Crowsnest Mountains ecodistrict, Northern Continental Divide ecoregion, Columbia Montane Cordillera ecoprovince, Montane Cordillera ecozone.

=== Geography ===
The park is in the Alberta foothills so the terrain is small, domed mountains, ridges and valleys. The Sheep River valley runs through the center of the park. Elevations range from a high of 2,789 m (9,150 ft) at the peak of Bluerock Mountain in the far northwest to a low of 1,322 m (4,337 ft) in the valley of the Sheep River where it exits the park on the far eastern boundary. In the southern portion of the park, Green Mountain (1,844 m (6,050 ft)) and Mount McNab (1,690 m (5,540 ft)) are the two named mountains. Landforms consist of bedrock ridges of sandstones, shales and siltstone. Covering the bedrock is colluvium on the slopes or glacial debris in valley bottoms. Terraces are present in the Sheep River valley formed during the most recent glaciation. Other main landforms are scenic canyons of the Sheep River and several tributary creeks which have carved out of the softer shales and sandstones.

=== Climate ===
The Köppen climate classification of the park is Continental, Subarctic (Dfc) characterized by long, cold winters, and short, warm to cool summers. Using the data from a weather stations within Sheep River Provincial Park, Sheep River II, for 1991 to 2020, the average daily temperatures exceeds 10 °C (50 °F) only for June, July, and August while average daily temperatures are less than 0 °C (32 °F) for November through March. At Sheep River II, the long-run average precipitation from 1991 to 2020 for the wettest month, June, exceeds 130 mm (5.1 in) per month; conversely, the station receive less than 40 mm (1.6 in) per month from October through March. Prevailing winds are out of the south and southwest with Chinook winds frequent in winter.

=== Hydrology ===
The park protects the watershed of the Sheep River, a tributary of the Bow and South Saskatchewan Rivers. This watershed is an important source of drinking water for downstream users and must be managed to maintain existing flows and high water quality. The Rocky Mountains Forest Reserve was created for "the conservation of the forests ... and for the maintenance of conditions favourable to an optimum water supply". The Bluerock, Gorge and Dyson Creeks enter the Sheep River within Sheep River Provincial Park. The aquatic habitat of the Sheep River in the park is described as "pristine, cold, clear water".

=== Vegetation ===
Vegetation in the park is dictated by the elevation and direction of the slopes. Along the Sheep River valley, deciduous forests are common and are dominated by aspen and pinegrass. Balsam Poplar and cow parsnip grow in seepage areas. The lowest elevation of coniferous forests, the Pine zone, is dominated by lodgepole pine. The next level above the Pine zone, the Spruce-Fir zone, transitions from lodgepole pine to Engelmann spruce and subalpine fir. Above this, the Upper Subalpine zone is characterized Engelmann spruce, alpine fir, whitebark pine, and alpine larch in sparse, open canopied meadows.

At lower altitudes, grasses in the Sheep River valley are rough fescue, Parry's oatgrass and Idaho fescue. In wet areas, the grass and shrublands are water sedge, tufted hairgrass, bog birch and willow dominated. On south-facing slopes at lower elevations, rough fescue, sedge, and Richardson's needlegrass dominate. At higher elevations on steeper slopes, Hairy wild rye and rough fescue dominate.

=== Wildlife ===
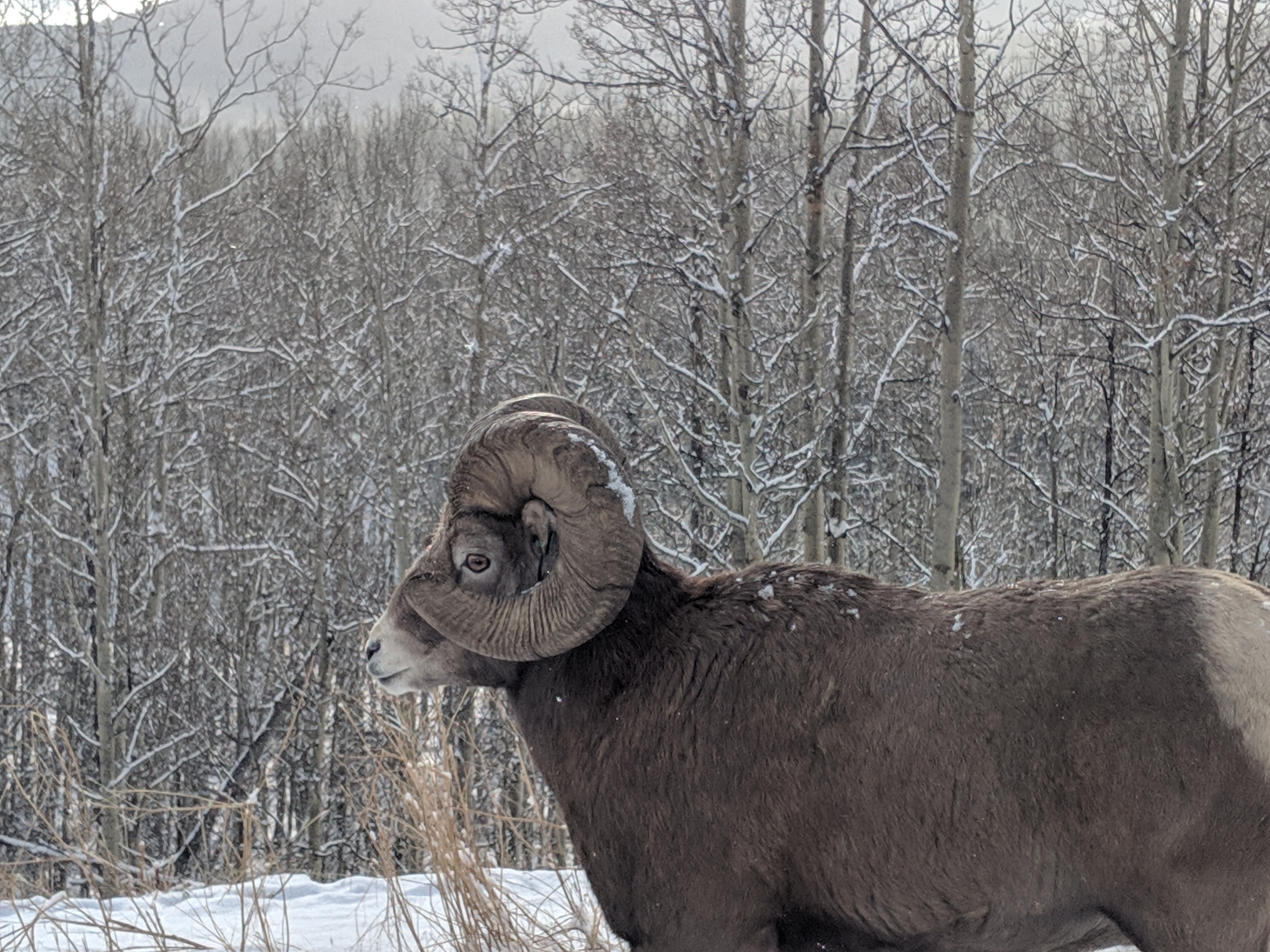
Rocky Mountain Big Horn Sheep in Bluerock Wildland Provincial Park

South and west facing slopes exposed to direct sun and the influence of prevailing and Chinook winds that quickly remove snow provide grazing for large ungulates. The adjacent Sheep River Provincial Park contains the Sheep River Wildlife Sanctuary which was established in 1973 to protect the wintering range of the Rocky Mountain Bighorn Sheep. Other ungulates that are common to the park are elk, mule deer, and white-tailed deer. Moose are present in the park but less common.

Carnivores common to the park are American black bears, bobcat, Canada lynx, coyotes, grizzly bears, wolverines, and northern Rocky Mountain wolves. Cougars are especially abundant; this area has one of the highest densities of cougars found anywhere. The park provides a travel corridor for numerous wildlife species. Many species use the park for a wintering range and then proceed west for the summer.

Upland game birds found in the park include blue, ruffed, and spruce grouse. A migration of birds of prey occurs each spring and fall. Examples of species include Peregrine falcon, golden and bald eagles, gyrfalcons, and Turkey vultures. Species of owl having been recorded in the park include barred, boreal, great gray, great horned, long-eared, northern pygmy, and northern Saw-whet owls. Harlequin ducks have been observed along the Sheep River and Dyson Creek.

The Sheep River is home to native westslope cutthroat trout, bull trout and mountain whitefish. In the mid 1900s, cutthroat trout and non-native rainbow trout and brook trout were stocked into the Sheep River and many of its tributaries. Since 1971, only native cutthroat trout have been stocked in the Sheep River. Since 2001, the Sheep River and its tributaries upstream of the Gorge Creek have been closed to fishing to protect the spawning area for bull trout population. The Sheep River between Gorge Creek and Sheep River Falls has the largest known concentration of spawning bull trout in the Bow River watershed downstream of the Kananaskis River.

== Activities ==
There are no designated backcountry campgrounds so only random backcountry camping is available. There is a significant trail network in the park and into the adjacent parks. Front and backcountry hiking, horseback, trail riding and mountain biking/cycling are permissible on existing trails. Geocaching is available. Hunting and fishing are allowed with permits.

== See also ==
- List of provincial parks in Alberta
- List of Canadian provincial parks
- Ecology of the Rocky Mountains
