= Spray Valley Provincial Park =

Provincial park in Alberta, Canada

- IUCN category II (national park)
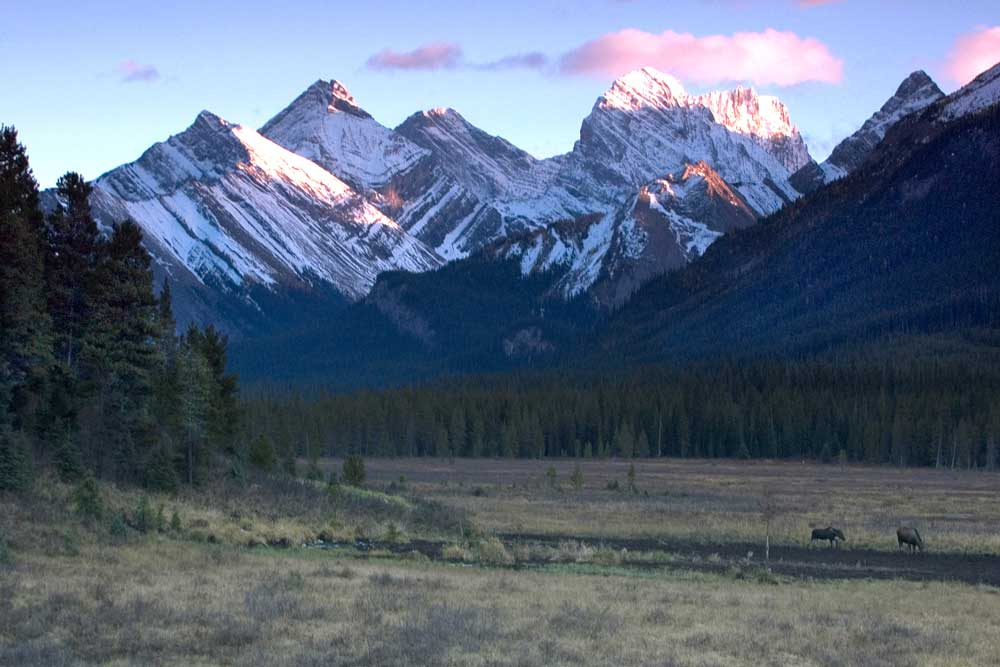
- Spray Valley Provincial Park

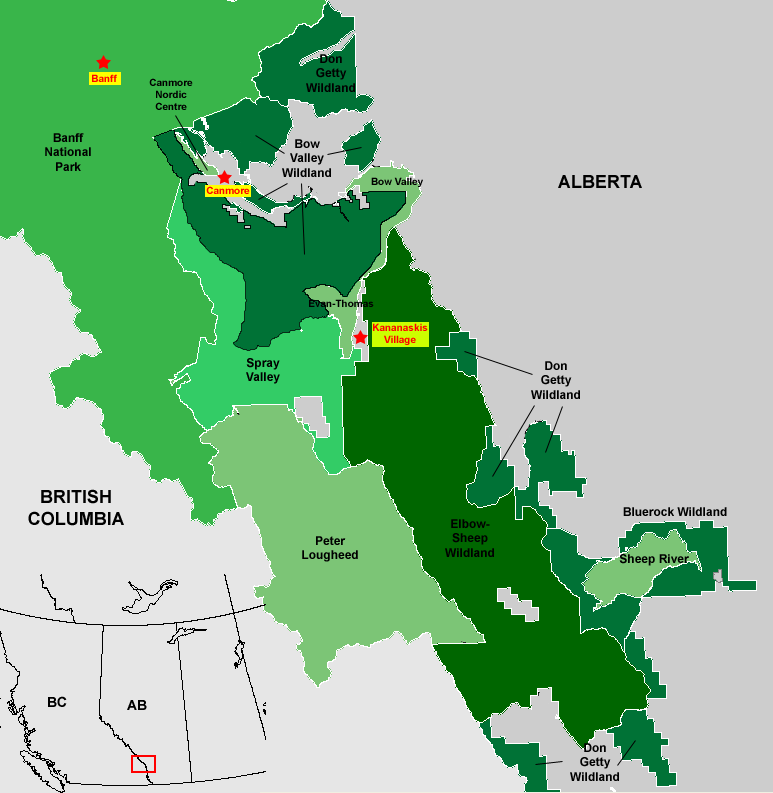
- Location within Kananaskis park system
- Location: Kananaskis, Alberta Canada
- Nearest city: Canmore, Calgary
- Coordinates: 50°53′38″N 115°17′06″W
- Area: 255 km^{2} (98 sq mi)
- Established: December 2000
- Governing body: Alberta Environment and Protected Areas, Kananaskis Country Campgrounds
- Website: https://www.albertaparks.ca/parks/kananaskis/spray-valley-pp/

Spray Valley Provincial Park is a provincial park located east of the Rocky Mountains, along the Spray River in western Alberta, Canada.

The park is part of the Kananaskis Country park system, along with Bluerock Wildland Provincial Park, Bow Valley Provincial Park, Bow Valley Wildland Provincial Park, Canmore Nordic Centre Provincial Park, Don Getty Wildland Provincial Park, Elbow-Sheep Wildland Provincial Park, Peter Lougheed Provincial Park, Plateau Mountain Ecological Reserve, Sheep River Provincial Park and numerous designated provincial recreational areas. Spray Valley borders Banff National Park to the west.

Spray Valley Provincial Park falls under the jurisdiction of Alberta Culture and on-site management is delegated to Cedar & Spruce Campgrounds.

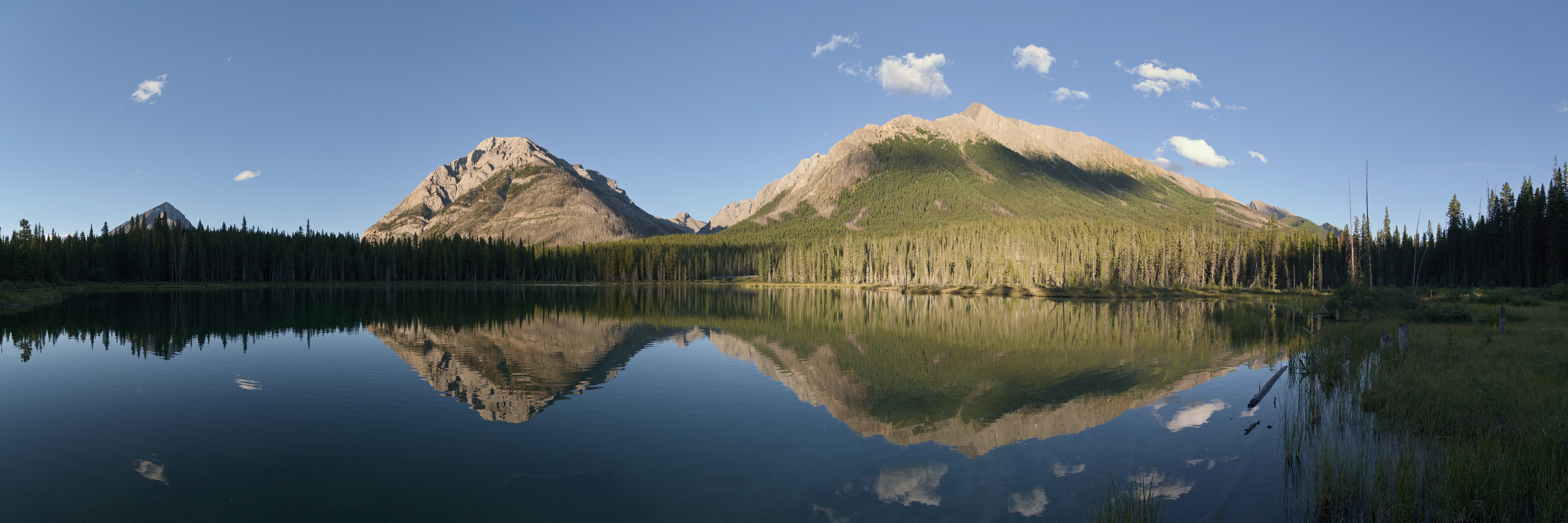
Buller Pond at Mount Buller day use area.

== History ==
Spray Valley mountains, Mount Shark and Mount Sparrowhawk were designated as sites to host alpine skiing events in Calgary's bid for the 1988 Winter Olympics, however, the venue for the alpine skiing events moved to Nakiska shortly after Calgary was awarded the Games.

== Activities ==
Spray Valley Provincial Park is easily accessible by road via the Bighorn Highway, and provides a setting for low impact activities such as hiking and cross-country skiing. Camping is permitted in summer (from Victoria Day weekend in May to Thanksgiving weekend in October) at the Lillian Lake, Ribbon Falls, Ribbon Lake, Eau Claire and Spray Lakes West campgrounds, and in winter at the Buller Mountain and Eau Claire campgrounds. Several day use areas are open for public in summer (with two areas, Sparrowhawk and Mount Shark, available year round).

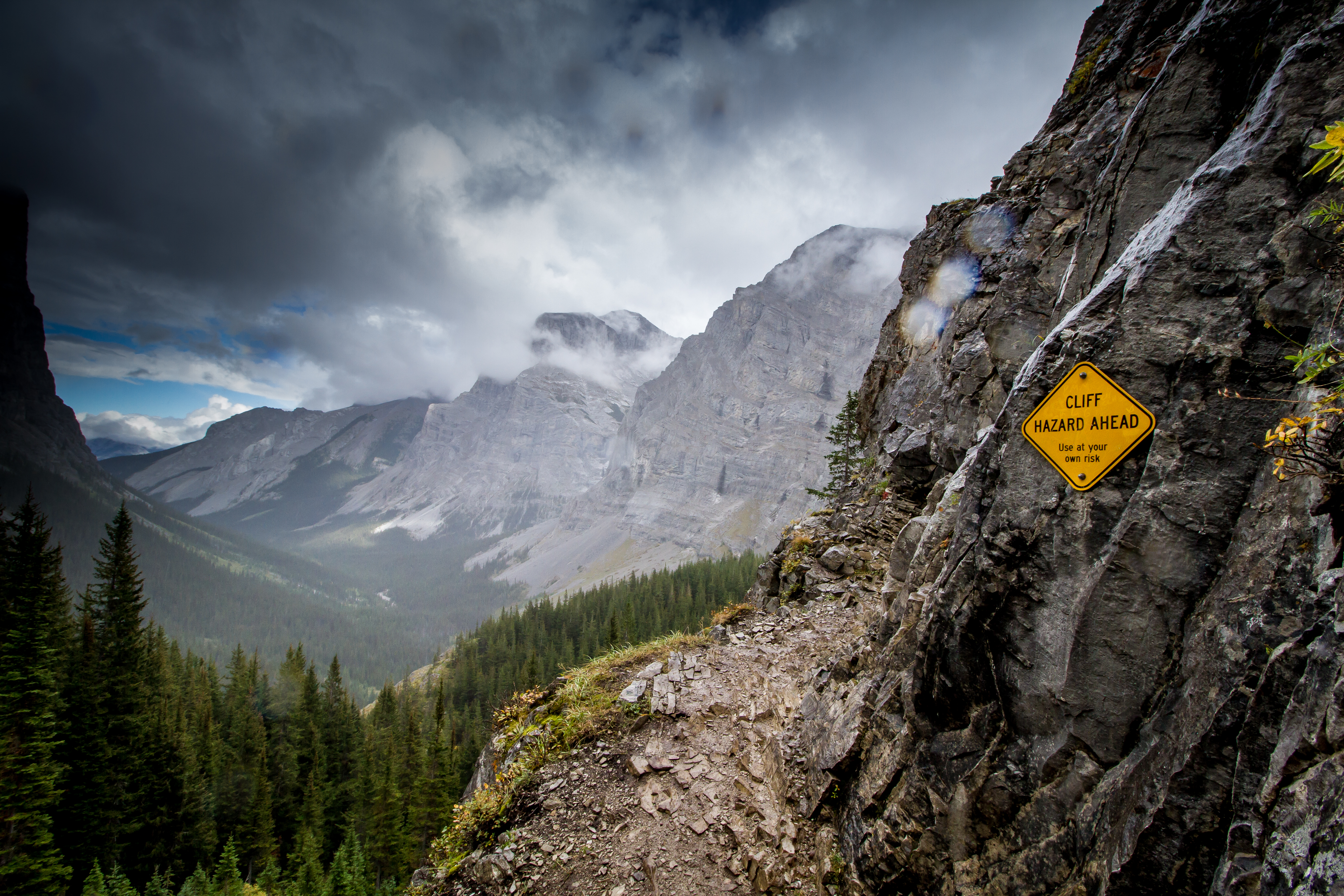
A storm rolling into the Ribbon Creek valley is viewed from the trail leading up the cliff face beside Ribbon Falls in Spray Valley Provincial Park.

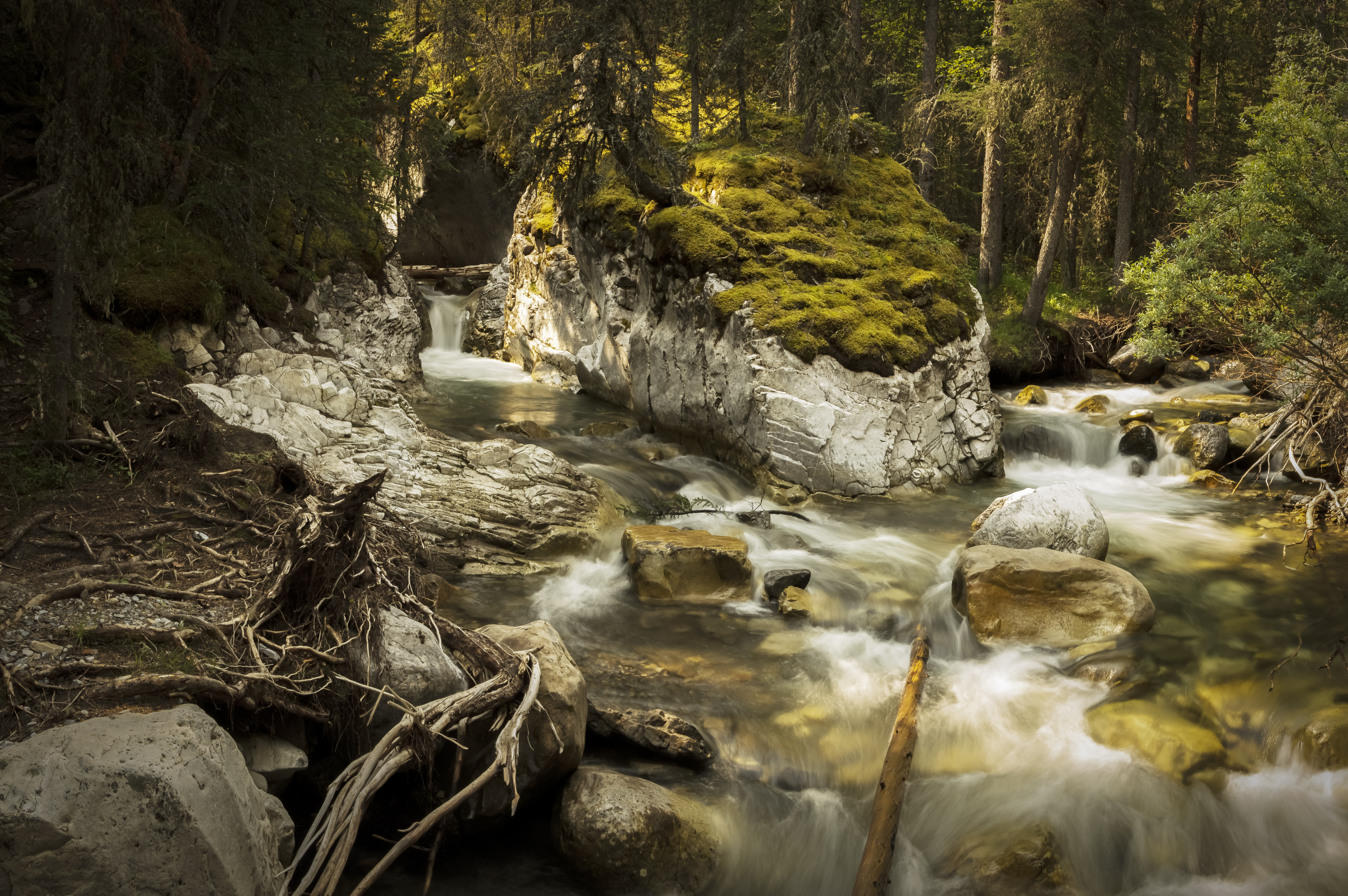
Two tributaries meet along Galatea Creek in Spray Valley Provincial Park.

Other recreational activities include canoeing, kayaking, fishing for trout and ice fishing.

== Conservation ==
A management plan approved in April 2006 by Kananaskis Country restricts further development in the park area, in order to preserve the ecological integrity. Restrictions were imposed on off-road vehicles, snowmobiles, horseback riding and biking, however a site in the Spray Valley is considered for the construction of a small lodge.

== See also ==
- List of provincial parks in Alberta
- List of Canadian protected areas
- List of national parks of Canada
