= Sentinel Pass =

Sentinel Pass may be one of the following:

== Mountain Passes ==
- Sentinel Pass (Banff National Park) – a pass in Banff National Park, Alberta, Canada
- Sentinel Pass (Kananaskis Country) – a pass in Kananaskis Country, Alberta, Canada
