= Kananaskis Country =

Parks in the foothills of the Canadian Rockies, Alberta

Coordinates: 50.9°N 114.9°W

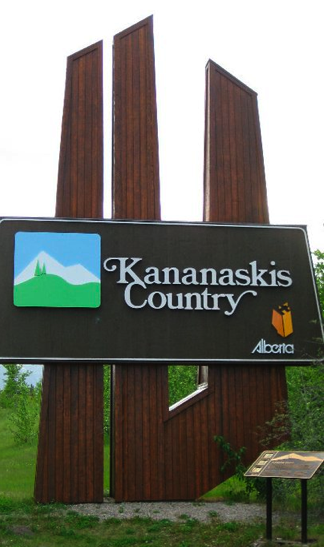
Kananaskis Country highway entry sign

Kananaskis Country (also known as K-Country) is a multi-use area located west of Calgary in the foothills and front ranges of the Canadian Rockies, Alberta, Canada. Kananaskis Country has also been referred to as a recreation area, a park system, and a planning area.

The area's western edge borders Banff National Park and the Alberta-British Columbia border. The region owes its name to the Kananaskis River, which was named by John Palliser in 1858 after a legendary Cree Native. Covering an area of approximately 4,000 km^{2} (1,500 sq mi), Kananaskis Country was established by the Alberta Government in 1978 to provide a variety of land uses and designations. Land uses include resource extraction activities (such as forestry, cattle grazing, water, oil and gas), recreation, power generation, and residential communities. Land designations include public land and protected areas.

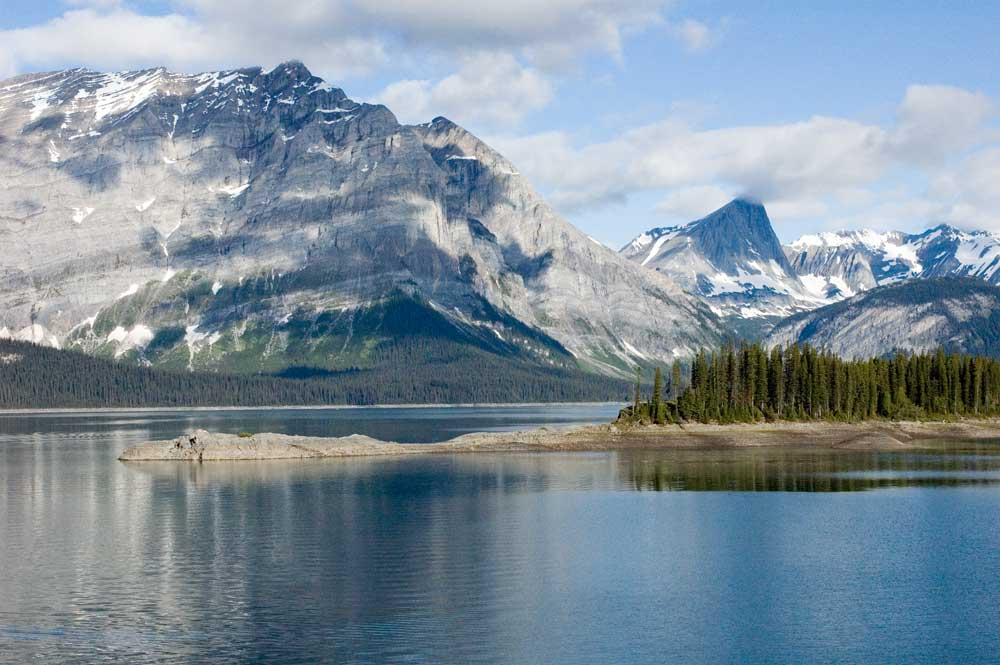
Upper Kananaskis Lake in Peter Lougheed Provincial Park

== History and administration ==
Humans have occupied the Kananaskis area for thousands of years before Europeans arrived. Early First Nations groups followed a seasonal migration pattern based on following bison and other animals. The region was hunting territory of the Blackfoot Confederacy, the Kootenay and the Stoneys (Nakoda). The Stoneys eventually became dominant in the area. After the Blackfoot Confederacy and the Stoneys signed Treaty 7 in 1877, the Stoneys moved to their reserve at nearby Morley (now called Mînî Thnî).

Explorers and traders entered the area in the late 1700s and 1800s. Methodist missionaries were some of the earliest to arrive. During the expedition of 1857–1860, the explorer John Palliser chose to name the pass he was going to cross Kananaskis Pass, "after the name of an Indian, of whom there is a legend, giving an account of his most wonderful recovery from the blow of an axe which had stunned but had failed to kill him". Palliser also gave the name Kananaskis to a river and two lakes in the region.

The late 19th century and early 20th century saw the development of commercial use such as lumbering, hydroelectric developments, and coal mining in the eastern slopes of the Rockies, which included what is now the Kananaskis region. When control over natural resources and Crown land was transferred from federal responsibility to Alberta in 1930, the province's natural resources were considered to be a source of considerable wealth that would stay within the province. This led to more commercial use and the establishing of a provincial park system. Tourism and recreational demand also increased after the Second World War.

Increased recreational use, especially after the completion of industrial access roads, led to serious environmental problems in the eastern slopes area. The environmental effects of the petroleum industry and coal mining were also causing problems that needed to be minimized. Environmental protection, including the importance of protecting and regulating stream flow, became a concern. These issues led to the establishment of Kananaskis Country, whose main intent was to provide recreational opportunities that were balanced with resource protection and commercial interests.

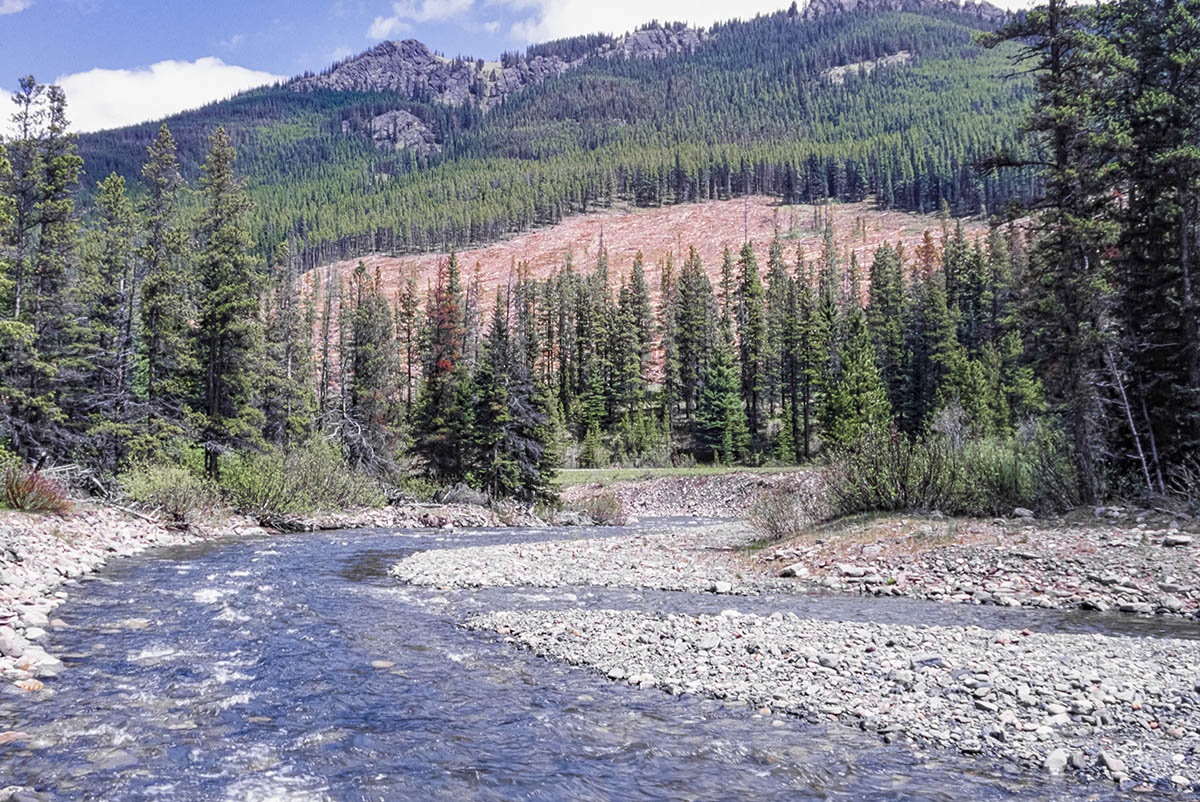
Clearcut area in Kananaskis Country. Logging is one of a number of commercial activities carried on in the region. The stream is Wilkinson Creek.

Three people were instrumental in forming Kananaskis Country: Alberta Premier Peter Lougheed; Minister of Highways and rancher Clarence Copithorne; and architect, environmentalist, and member of the Kananaskis Country Advisory Board, William G.(Bill) Milne. Peter Lougheed's relationship with Kananaskis Country was focused on diversifying the economy. He hoped to open the area to profit-generating activities, while at the same time protecting the area as much as possible. He expected that resource extraction industries in the area such as timber cutting and oil and gas recovery, along with tourism and recreation would strengthen Alberta's economy. The impetus for forming Kananaskis Country started with Clarence Copithorne, who planned to upgrade highway access into the Kananaskis Valley for the purpose of controlling recreational use in the foothills. His vision was one of encouraging strenuous activities in locations that were easily accessible. Bill Milne encouraged public participation in planning and developing the area. Milne proposed a large multi-use area that would protect wildlife and the areas's environment without too much commercial development. This proposal was endorsed by the premier. Kananaskis Country was officially dedicated by the premier in September 1978.

Although Kananaskis Country is often mistaken to be a single park, it comprises several provincial parks, wildland provincial parks, provincial recreation areas, an ecological reserve and Crown Land, and provides for various uses that include recreation, tourism, industry and preservation. The primary reason for Kananaskis Country's establishment, however, was to accommodate recreational pursuits. The Kananaskis Country subregional Integrated Resource Plan ensures that all activities are planned and facilities are developed to prioritize conservation and environmental protection. Not all areas of Kananaskis Country are covered by the same measure of protection and each area has its own permitted activities. The main (regional) Kananaskis parks office is located in Canmore.

Improvement District No. 5 (Kananaskis), which shares most of its boundaries with Kananaskis Country, is the municipal region that provides local government and municipal services including fire protection, ambulance service, garbage handling, water, sewer, collecting taxes, and business licensing. Kananaskis Improvement District's municipal office is located in Kananaskis Village.

== Recreation and tourism ==
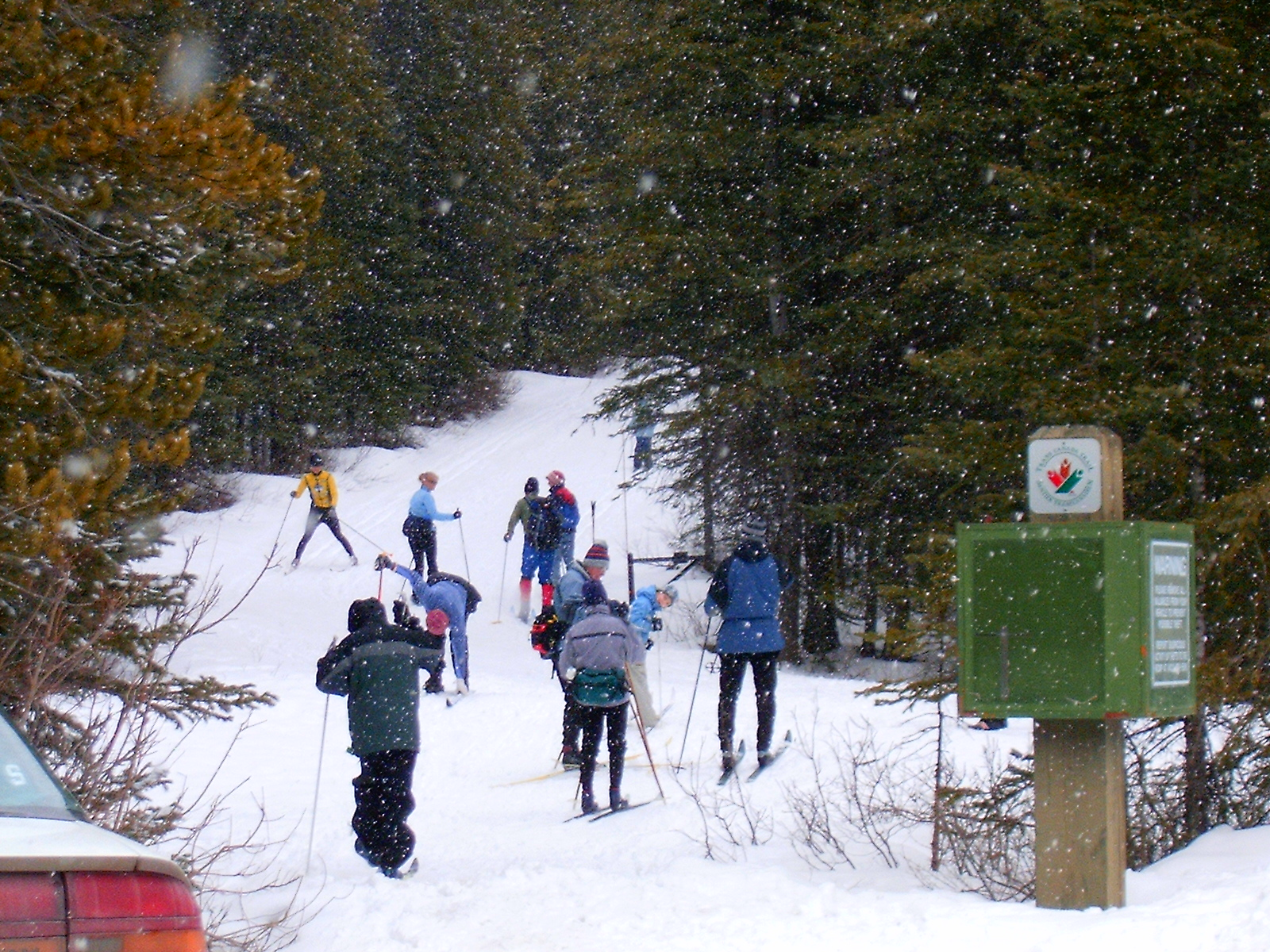
Cross-country skiing in Kananaskis

Although Kananaskis Country is a multi-use area, it is noted for recreation and tourism. One of the reasons the area was established was to "alleviate congestion in national parks, and to provide greater recreation opportunities for Albertans"

Recreation facilities in Kananaskis include several campgrounds, a golf course, a hotel, a holiday ranch, two alpine ski areas (Nakiska, which hosted alpine skiing and freestyle moguls skiing during the 1988 Winter Olympics and Fortress Mountain Resort) and a competitive cross-country ski area, the Canmore Nordic Centre, that the public can use. The Canmore Nordic Centre was the venue for cross-country skiing events during the 1988 Winter Olympics. Most of the development is within Peter Lougheed Provincial Park and along the highway 40 corridor that parallels the Kananaskis River and the Highwood River. Kananaskis has many kilometres of hiking, cross-country ski, and horse trails. Other activities popular in Kananaskis include mountain biking, scrambling, climbing, backpacking, hunting, and fishing.

== Parks and other areas ==
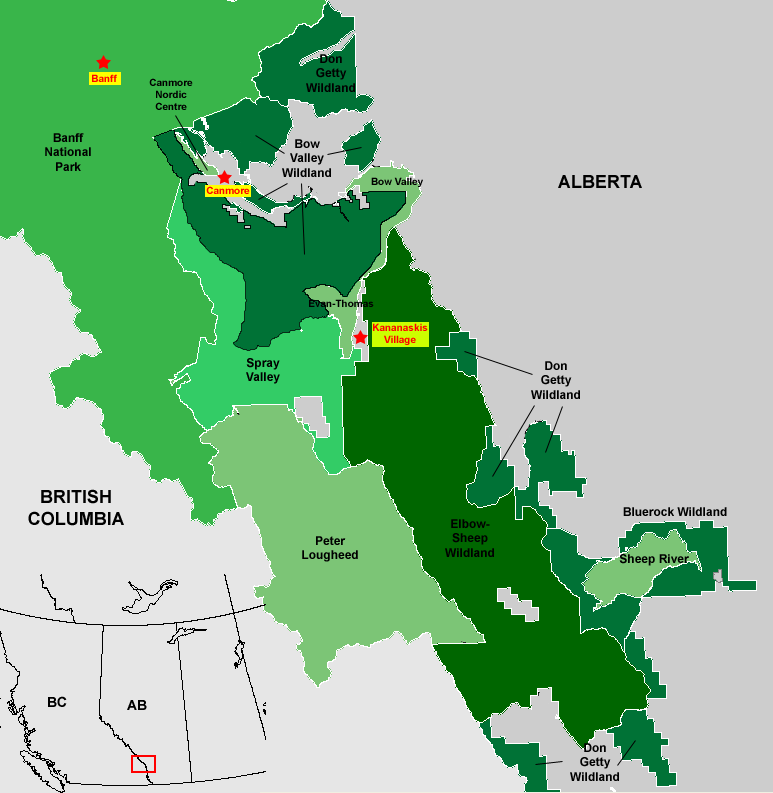
Extent and locations of parks in Kananaskis Country

Kananaskis Country contains five provincial parks, four wildland provincial parks, one ecological reserve, several provincial recreation areas, four public land use zones and two public land recreation trails. Each of these land use designations have a different purpose, different levels of protection, different permitted activities and different management priorities. These areas or designations include:

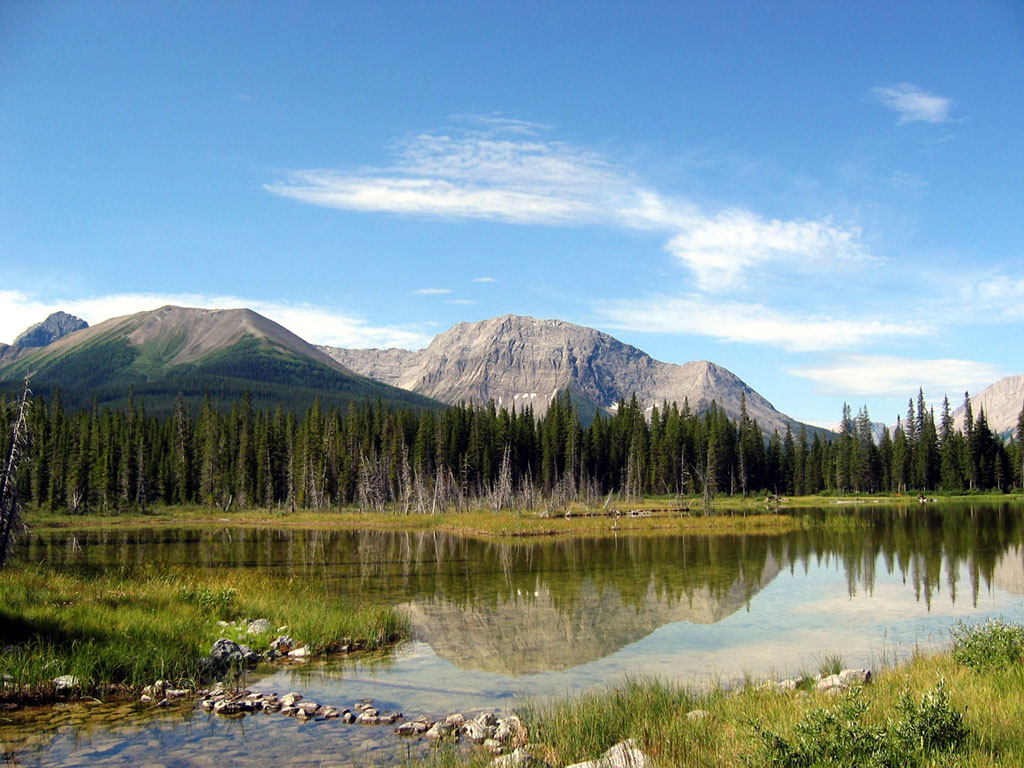
Peter Lougheed Provincial Park

=== Provincial parks ===
- Bow Valley Provincial Park
- Canmore Nordic Centre Provincial Park
- Peter Lougheed Provincial Park
- Sheep River Provincial Park
- Spray Valley Provincial Park

=== Wildland provincial parks ===
- Bluerock Wildland Provincial Park
- Bow Valley Wildland Provincial Park
- Don Getty Wildland Provincial Park
- Elbow-Sheep Wildland Provincial Park

=== Other areas ===
- Plateau Mountain Ecological Reserve

Special areas within Kananaskis Country that are not formally designated as parks or ecological reserves include the Bow Corridor Area, the Elbow River Valley Area, Evan-Thomas Provincial Recreation Area, the Highwood/Cataract Areas, Sentinel Provincial Recreation Area, Stoney Creek Provincial Recreation Area, Strawberry Provincial Recreation Area and the Sibbald Area (Sibbald Lake Provincial Recreation Area, Sibbald Meadows Pond Provincial Recreation Area).

=== Public land use areas ===
Kananaskis Country includes four areas of Crown land (also known as provincial land or public land) called Public Land Use Zones (PLUZ). The largest is the Kananaskis Country Public Land Use Zone which takes up over a quarter of Kananaskis Country's land area. The other public land uses zones are Sibbald, Cataract Creek, and McLean Creek. Land use zones do not include provincial parks or provincial recreation areas. Each Public Land Use Zone is managed differently, but permitted activities may include cattle grazing, trapping, mining, oil and gas exploration and production, logging, pipelines, cultivation, or commercial recreation operations. Recreational uses such as camping, mountain biking, hunting, hiking, horseback riding, and skiing are permitted with certain limitations. Motorized recreation is permitted in all zones except Kananaskis Country Public Land Use Zone.

Two public land recreation trails, which are actually roads, are included to permit motorized recreation: the Ford Creek-Jumpingpound Forest Recreation Trail and the Little Elbow Loop Public Land Recreation Trail.

== Natural environment ==
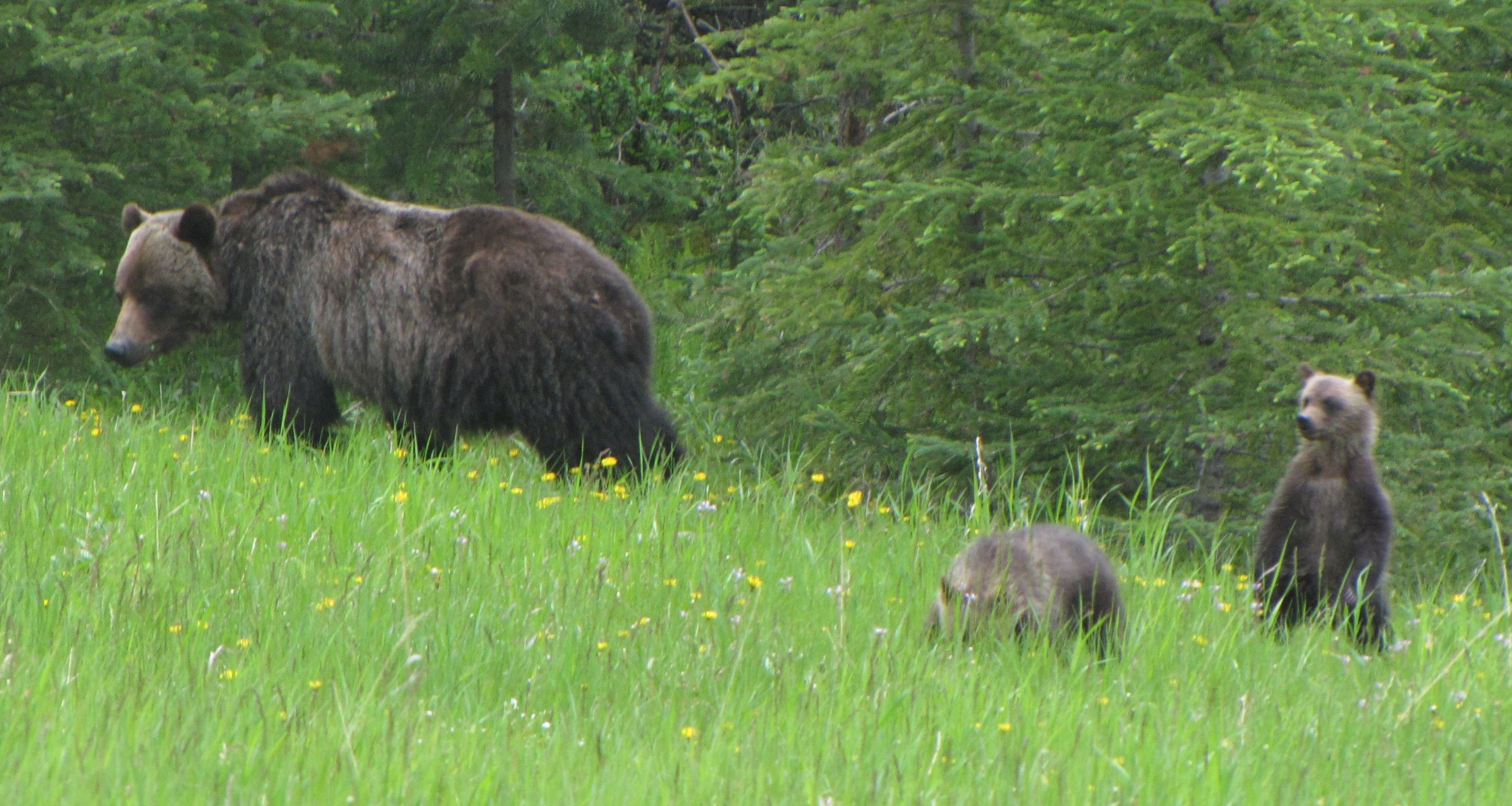
Grizzly bear sow and two cubs in Kananaskis Country

Two main landscapes make up the region: the rugged, high mountain peaks to the west, which includes alpine, subalpine and montane zones, and the lower, rolling foothills to the east. Between these two regions is a transitional zone with characteristics of both the mountains and the foothills. Kananaskis Country is the source of several rivers, including the Kananaskis River, the Elbow River, the Highwood River, the Sheep River, and the Livingstone River.

Major wildlife species include grizzly bears, black bears, cougars, bighorn sheep, pikas, elk, moose, wolves, mule deer, white-tailed deer, and golden eagles. Significant plant life includes Engelmann spruce, subalpine fir, alpine larch, whitebark pine, lodgepole pine, Canada buffalo-berry, white spruce, Douglas fir, rough fescue, and balsam poplar. Fish found in Kananaskis Country include rainbow trout, brown trout, brook trout, cutthroat trout, bull trout, lake trout, Arctic grayling, and mountain whitefish.

== Special facilities ==
A University of Calgary ecological and environmental research station is located at nearby Barrier Lake. A "Tim Horton Children's Foundation" summer camp is also located in the area. Easter Seals Camp Horizon is located within Kananaskis along Highway 66. A YMCA summer camp, Camp Chief Hector, is located alongside the Trans-Canada Highway near exit 114. William Watson Lodge, a facility for people with disabilities, seniors, and their families is located in Peter Lougheed Provincial Park.

== Access ==
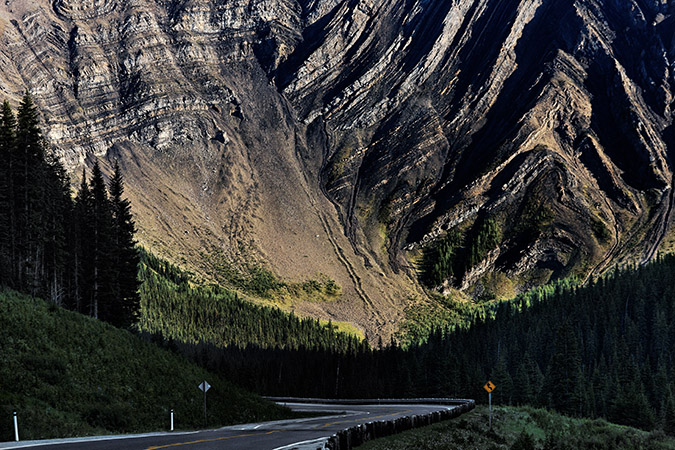
Highway 40 in the Kananaskis Valley, Alberta

Kananaskis Country can be accessed by several routes. Some of these roads have seasonal closures:

- Highway 40, a 66 km (41 mi) segment of the Bighorn Highway and also known as Kananaskis Trail.
- Highway 66, a 28 km (17 mi) highway originating near Bragg Creek known as Elbow Falls Trail
- Highway 68, a 42 km (26 mi) partly gravel highway originating from the Trans-Canada Highway (Highway 1) known as Sibbald Creek Trail
- Highway 546, known as Sheep River Trail, west of Turner Valley
- Highway 549 west of Millarville
- Highway 742, a partly gravel highway originating in Canmore known as Smith-Dorrien Trail, Spray Lakes Road/Trail, Three Sisters Parkway

In June 2021, the Alberta Government implemented fees for all personal and commercial vehicles stopping in Kananaskis Country. The fees, known as a conservation pass, are meant to provide more conservation and safety measures, and improve services and facilities. The fee does not apply to vehicles accessing the McLean Creek Land Use Zone, which caters to motorized recreation.

== G7/G8 summit meetings ==
=== 28th G8 summit ===
On June 26 and June 27, 2002, Kananaskis Country hosted the 28th G8 summit. This annual summit was held at Kananaskis Village. This was the second time Canada used a lodge venue for the G8 Summit, after its inaugural 7th G7 Summit at Montebello, Quebec in 1981. The 2002 conference pumped $300-million into the local economy, however, security cost taxpayers in excess of $200-million.

=== 51st G7 summit ===
On June 16 and June 17, 2025, Kananaskis Country hosted the 51st G7 summit. This annual summit was held at Kananaskis Village. This was the second such summit meeting to be held in Kananaskis, and the seventh summit held in Canada.

== Climate ==
Kananaskis experiences a subarctic climate (Köppen climate classification Dfc).

Climate data for KANANASKIS 1981-2010 Normals
Month	Jan	Feb	Mar	Apr	May	Jun	Jul	Aug	Sep	Oct	Nov	Dec	Year
Record high °C (°F)	19.0 (66.2)	18.0 (64.4)	20.5 (68.9)	26.1 (79.0)	29.5 (85.1)	31.1 (88.0)	34.5 (94.1)	33.3 (91.9)	31.0 (87.8)	27.2 (81.0)	19.5 (67.1)	16.1 (61.0)	34.5 (94.1)
Mean daily maximum °C (°F)	−0.3 (31.5)	1.3 (34.3)	4.5 (40.1)	9.4 (48.9)	14.4 (57.9)	18.3 (64.9)	22.1 (71.8)	21.6 (70.9)	16.5 (61.7)	10.4 (50.7)	2.8 (37.0)	−1.0 (30.2)	10.0 (50.0)
Daily mean °C (°F)	−6.1 (21.0)	−4.7 (23.5)	−1.6 (29.1)	3.2 (37.8)	7.7 (45.9)	11.4 (52.5)	14.5 (58.1)	13.8 (56.8)	9.4 (48.9)	4.5 (40.1)	−2.3 (27.9)	−6.2 (20.8)	3.6 (38.5)
Mean daily minimum °C (°F)	−11.7 (10.9)	−10.7 (12.7)	−7.7 (18.1)	−3.1 (26.4)	0.9 (33.6)	4.5 (40.1)	6.8 (44.2)	6.0 (42.8)	2.2 (36.0)	−1.5 (29.3)	−7.3 (18.9)	−11.4 (11.5)	−2.7 (27.1)
Record low °C (°F)	−45.6 (−50.1)	−43.5 (−46.3)	−40.6 (−41.1)	−31.1 (−24.0)	−21.7 (−7.1)	−8.3 (17.1)	−2.5 (27.5)	−4.0 (24.8)	−14.0 (6.8)	−29.0 (−20.2)	−37.0 (−34.6)	−42.2 (−44.0)	−45.6 (−50.1)
Average precipitation mm (inches)	21.2 (0.83)	21.0 (0.83)	40.7 (1.60)	55.4 (2.18)	88.5 (3.48)	119.4 (4.70)	64.9 (2.56)	70.8 (2.79)	72.8 (2.87)	39.0 (1.54)	26.7 (1.05)	18.9 (0.74)	639.4 (25.17)
Average rainfall mm (inches)	1.2 (0.05)	0.3 (0.01)	2.9 (0.11)	13.9 (0.55)	60.5 (2.38)	118.2 (4.65)	64.9 (2.56)	70.2 (2.76)	56.6 (2.23)	11.2 (0.44)	3.4 (0.13)	1.1 (0.04)	404.6 (15.93)
Average snowfall cm (inches)	22.0 (8.7)	23.7 (9.3)	41.4 (16.3)	44.9 (17.7)	29.2 (11.5)	1.2 (0.5)	0 (0)	0.6 (0.2)	16.3 (6.4)	29.6 (11.7)	28.4 (11.2)	19.2 (7.6)	256.5 (101.0)
Average precipitation days (≥ 0.2 mm)	7.0	6.7	9.6	10.2	13.1	14.9	12.7	13.1	11.4	8.9	7.5	6.3	121.1
Average rainy days (≥ 0.2 mm)	0.63	0.22	1.2	3.8	10.8	14.8	12.7	13.0	10.2	5.0	1.4	0.50	74.2
Average snowy days (≥ 0.2 cm)	6.4	6.5	8.7	7.9	3.9	0.23	0	0.19	2.3	5.5	6.8	5.9	54.2
Mean monthly sunshine hours	63.9	101.8	155.4	171.2	205.7	217.1	250.7	228.9	166.2	133.7	69.2	47.9	1,811.7
Percentage possible sunshine	24.3	36.1	42.3	41.3	42.7	44.0	50.4	50.7	43.7	40.2	25.7	19.3	38.4
Source: Environment Canada. Station elevation is 1391 meters.

== Photo gallery ==
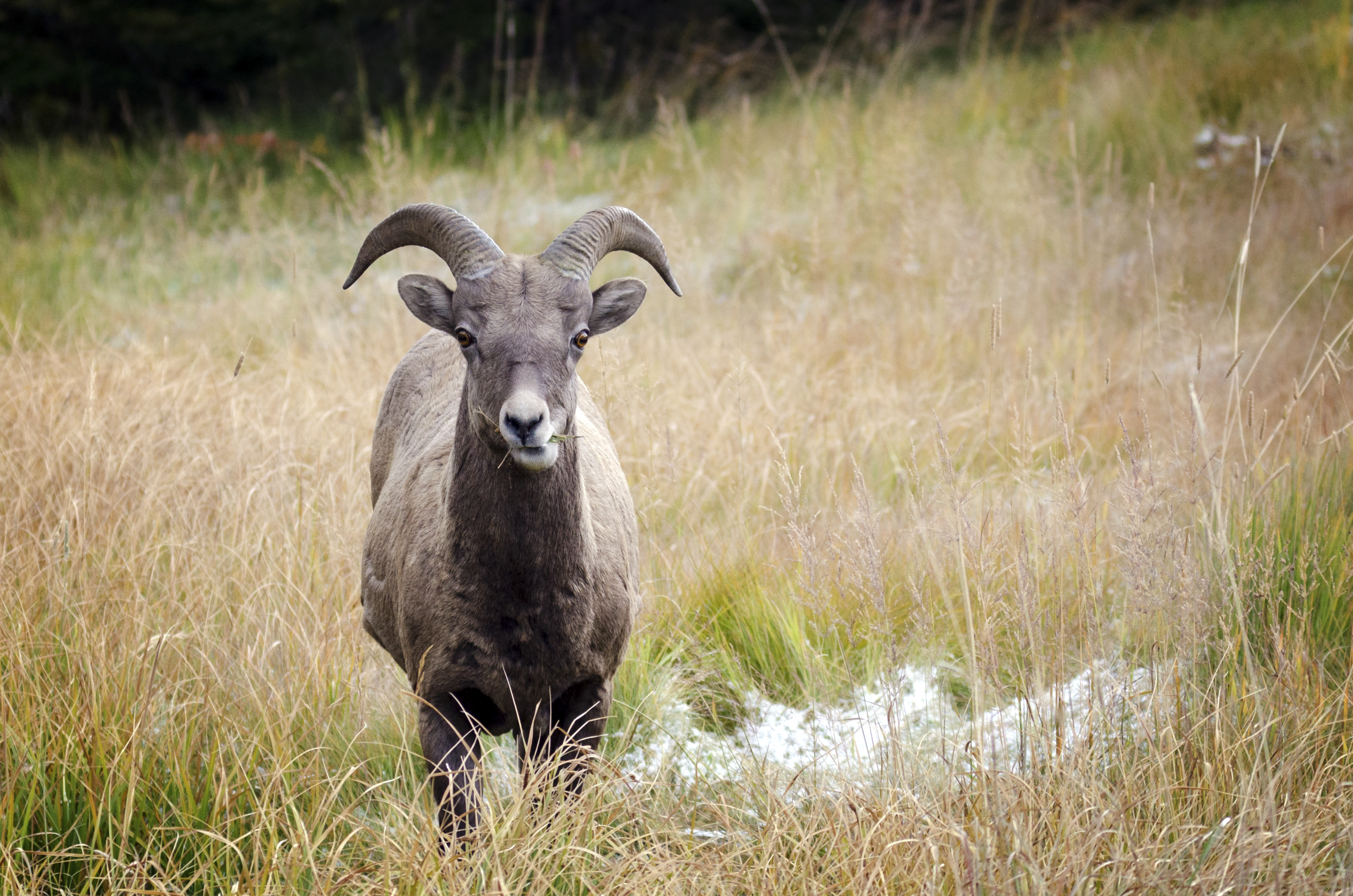
Bighorn sheep in Kananaskis

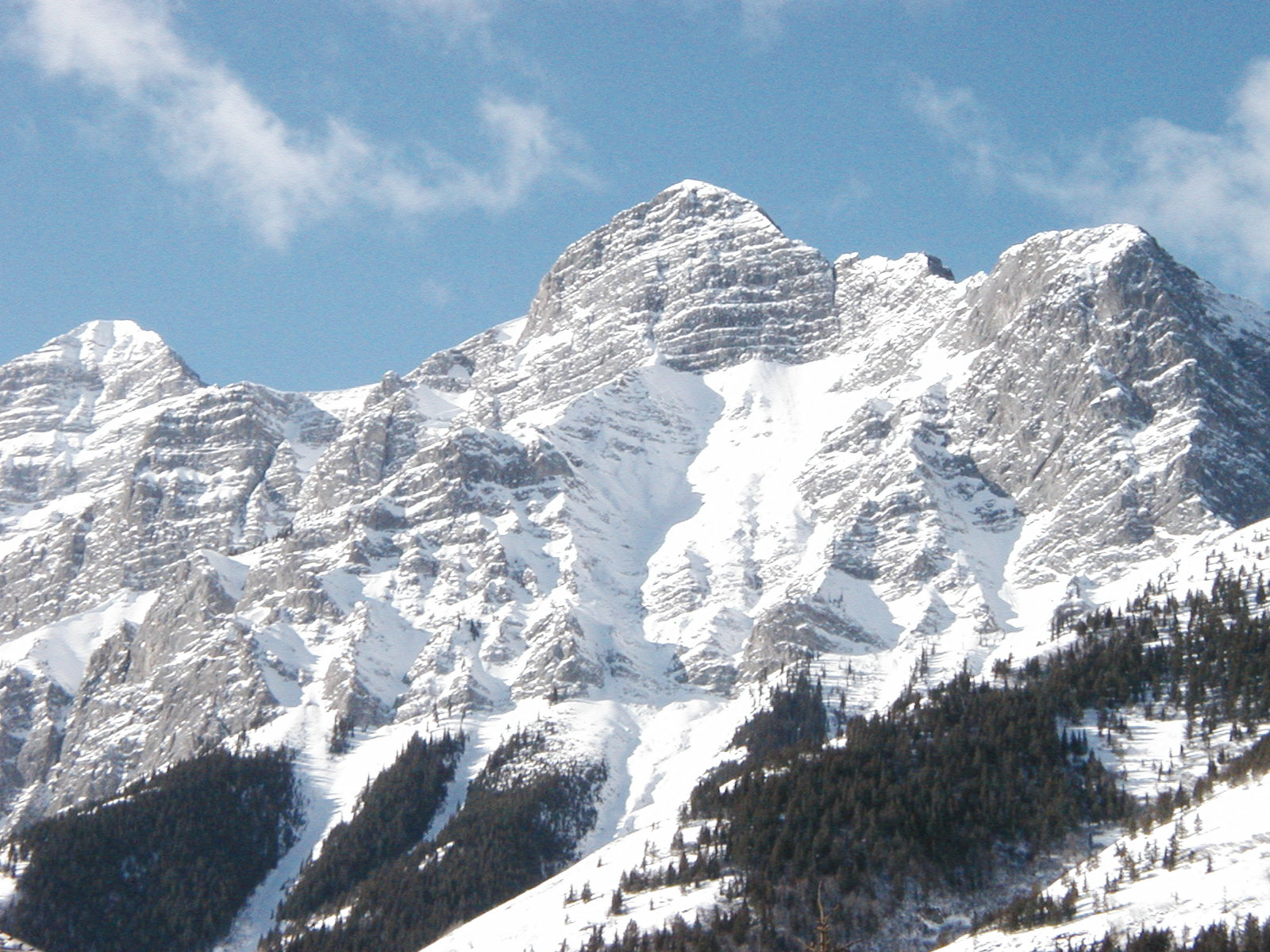
View from Kananaskis Village of Mount Kidd

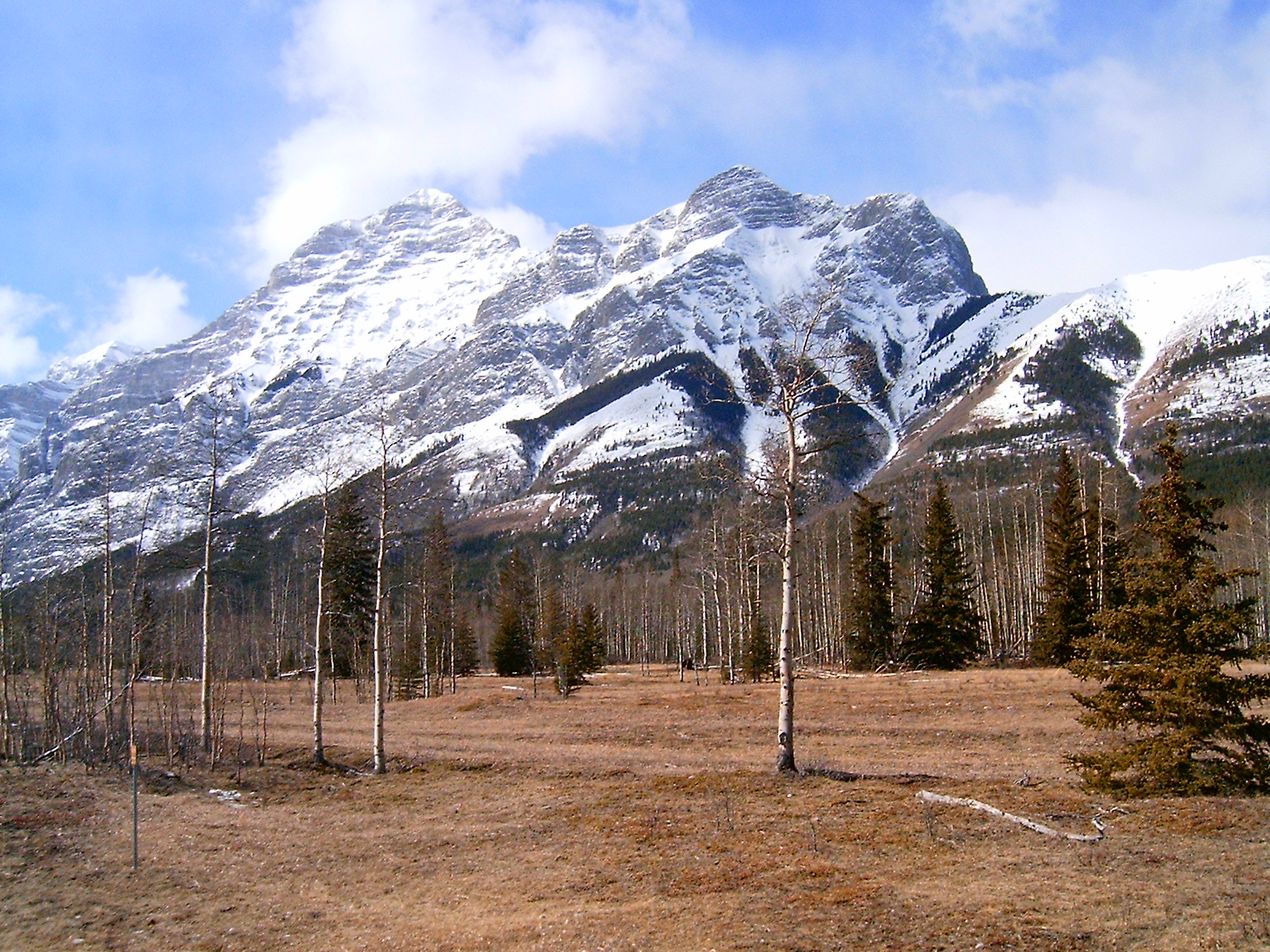
Kananaskis Country

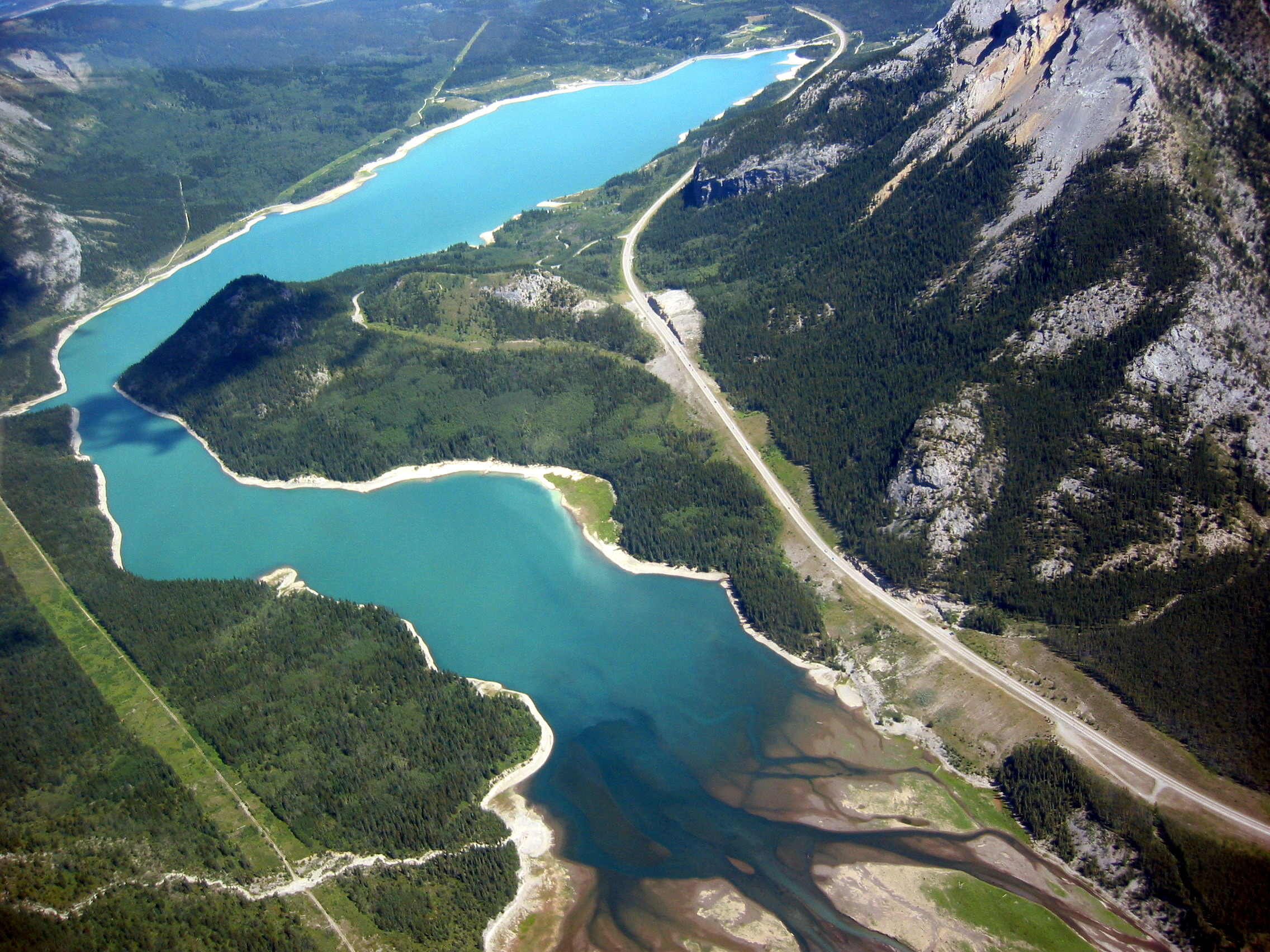
Barrier Lake

== See also ==
- The Canadian Rockies Trail Guide
- Scrambles in the Canadian Rockies
- List of Alberta provincial parks
- Rocky Mountains Forest Reserve
- Alberta Mountain forests
- Camp 130
