= Camp 130 =

Canadian prisoner of war camp

Coordinates: 51.0284°N 115.0347°W

Camp 130, also known as the Kananaskis Camp and the Camp Seebe, was a Canadian prisoner-of-war camp located near Seebe, Alberta. The camp operated from September 1939 to June 1946.

== Overview ==
The camp, located in Kananaskis Country and overlooking Barrier Lake, was founded on September 29, 1939. It initially housed German civilians and merchant seamen. In 1940, 44 Italian-Canadians were sent to the camp. In July 1941 the civilian prisoners were transferred to another camp, and guard towers and barbed wire was installed for its new prisoners. The camp eventually held a population of 725 German soldiers and officers.
