= Rough fescue =

Rough fescue is a common name for several plant and may refer to:

- Festuca altaica, perennial bunchgrass native to Asia and North America
- Festuca campestris, grass native to western North America
