= Junction Creek =

Creek in Alberta, Canada

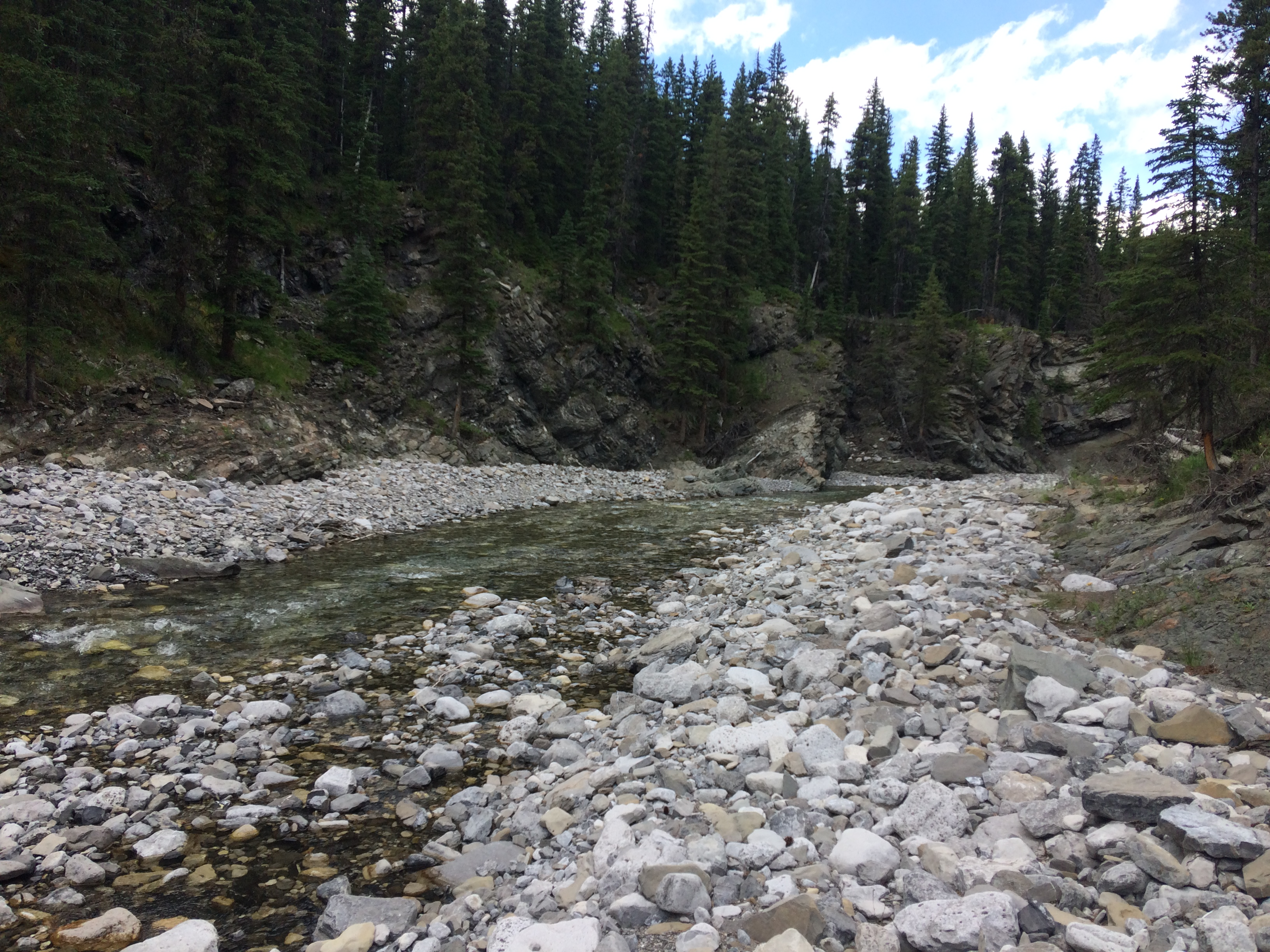
- Junction Creek

Location
- Country: Canada
- Province: Alberta

Physical characteristics
- Source
  - location: Rocky Mountains
- Mouth
  - location: Sheep River
  - coordinates: 50°36′13″N 114°44′08″W
- Length: 10.6 km (6.6 mi)

Junction Creek is a creek in southwestern Alberta. It is a tributary of the Sheep River.

== See also ==
- List of rivers of Alberta
