= Bluerock Creek =

Creek in Alberta, Canada

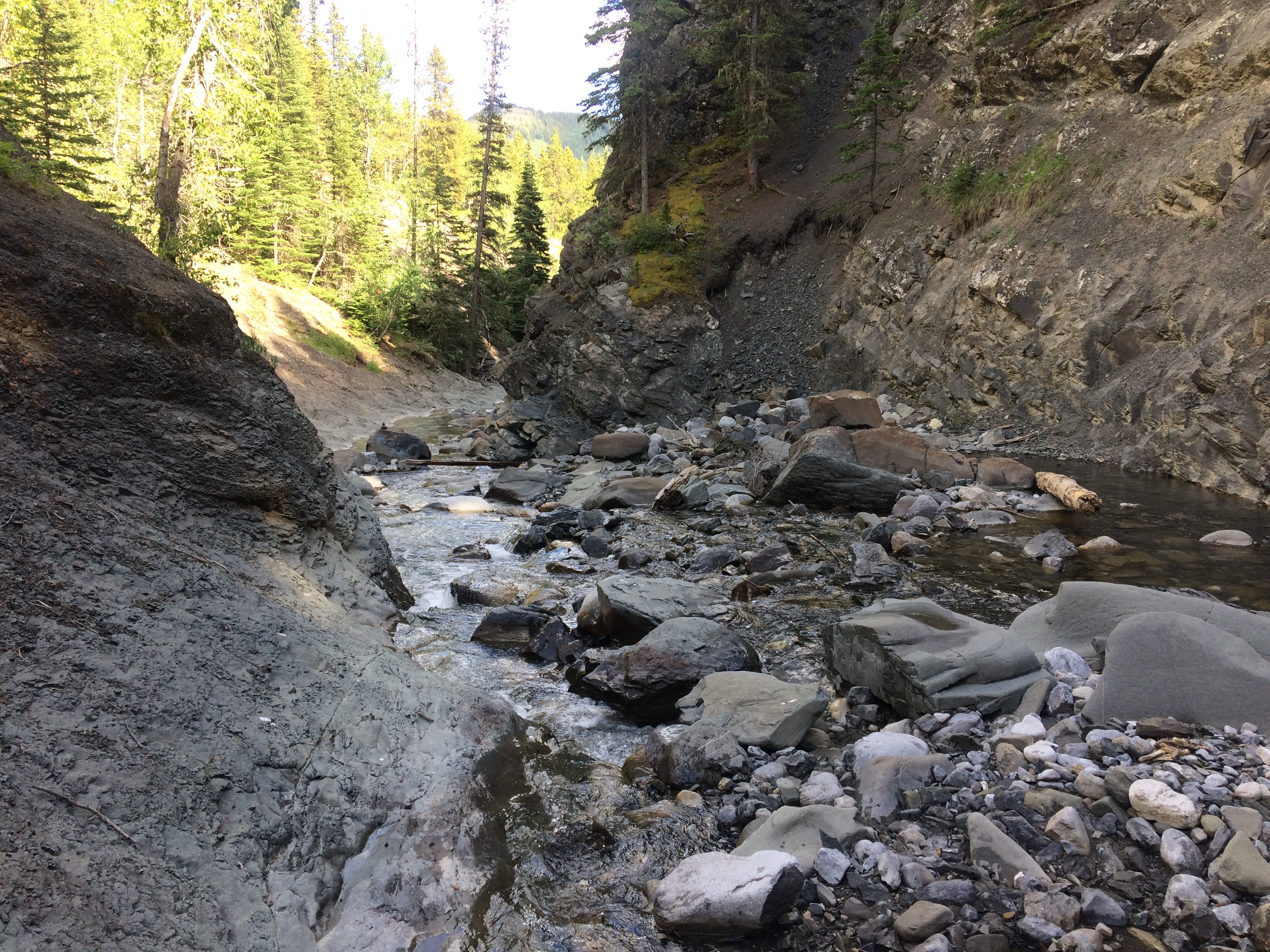
- The deep gorge of Bluerock Creek

Location
- Country: Canada
- Province: Alberta

Physical characteristics
- Source
  - location: Rocky Mountains
- Mouth
  - location: Sheep River
  - coordinates: 50°36′27″N 114°43′40″W
- Length: 11.4 km (7.1 mi)

Bluerock Creek is a creek located in southern Alberta, Canada. It is a tributary of the Sheep River, which itself is a tributary of the Highwood River. The creek runs for 11.4 km from its source in the foothills of the Rocky Mountains to its confluence with the Sheep River.

== History ==
Bluerock Creek's steep canyon walls were created by glacial forces during the last ice age. Logging in and around the Sheep River began in the early 1900s, around the same time nearby Turner Valley was settled. After several decades of sporadic and rather unprofitable logging, the last of these sawmills closed in 1955.

== Recreation ==
Bluerock Campground is located nearby. With 66 sites, the campground is also the trailhead of the Bluerock Creek Trail, which straddles the creek's left side.

== See also ==
- List of rivers of Alberta
