= Rocky Mountains Forest Reserve =

Natural reserve in Alberta, Canada

The Rocky Mountains Forest Reserve is a tract of land owned by the government of the Canadian province of Alberta (called "Crown land") along the eastern slopes and foothills of the Albertan section of the Canadian Rockies. It is a long strip of land just east of the Canadian Rocky Mountain parks, which is managed for forest and water conservation, public recreation, and industrial goals, rather than aesthetic and preservation goals, as in the Rocky Mountain parks.

== Establishment and purpose ==
Forest reserves were established for "...(1) the reserving of timber supplies, (2) the reserving of areas unsuited to agriculture so that they would not be homesteaded, and (3) the preserving of the water level in streams by conserving the timber on the upper watersheds". Government of Canada (1911). "All forest reserves are set aside and constituted for the conservation of the forests and other vegetation in the forests and for the maintenance of conditions favourable to an optimum water supply in those reserves." Province of Alberta (2004). The surveyor William Pearce was an early and influential advocate of preserving the region, and he convinced the government to set aside a large part of the region from the agricultural settlement occurring elsewhere in the Canadian West. His continued efforts persuaded the Canadian government, in 1902, to enlarge the adjacent Rocky Mountain Park (later Banff National Park) to 12,691 square kilometres (4,900 sq mi), twice its modern size. The Rocky Mountains Forest Reserve was first created in 1910 by the federal government of Canada by privy council order #939 to conserve forests and protect the headwaters of the rivers that supply most of the Canadian prairies from development. Since its inception, the area has been managed to conserve headwaters while allowing industrial activity, particularly logging and mining, with secondary importance placed on heavy tourist uses, in contrast to the neighbouring national parks. Nevertheless, water has been a recurring theme, with the protection of the headwaters always being the stated priority of government agencies. A 1911 report on the area by the Department of the Interior describes it as

a timbered area lying alongside of a prairie country hundreds of miles in extent ... form[ing] the watershed for the river systems which water the great plains to the east, where water supply is practically the only limit to anticipated settlement and development.

== Size and shape ==
The size and shape of the reserve changed repeatedly in its early years. In its original configuration in 1910, the forest reserve constituted two disconnected pieces of land, neither of which are part of the modern reserve. The more northerly part was north of Jasper National Park (today the Willmore Wilderness), and the southerly section was between Jasper National Park and Rocky Mountain Park (today the northern third of Banff National Park). In 1911, Jasper and Rocky Mountain parks were reduced in size and the land transferred to the Rocky Mountains Forest Reserve. The reserve was expanded eastwards in 1913. In 1917, Rocky Mountain Park and in 1927 Jasper Park were greatly expanded at the expense of the reserve. In 1929 and 1930, the park boundaries were adjusted slightly, giving the Kananaskis valley back to the reserve. With the passage of the Alberta Natural Resources Act, 1930, management of the parks and reserve became separated, as all public lands (outside of national parks and military bases) in Alberta were transferred from the federal to the provincial government, including the reserve. Water management was still a shared responsibility until the 1970s, however.

== Protected areas ==
Within the boundaries of the RMFR, protected areas include the following types:

- Wildland provincial parks: Brazeau Canyon, Don Getty, Bow Valley, Bluerock, Elbow-Sheep, Bob Creek, and Castle
- Wilderness areas: Ghost, Siffleur, and White Goat
- Provincial parks: Peter Lougheed, Spray Valley, Sheep, Bow Valley, Ram Falls, and Castle
- Natural areas – various
- Ecological reserves – various
- Provincial recreation areas – various

In 1948, the province designated all of its forested lands the "Green Area", including the eastern slopes. The provincial government did not enact legislation to formalize its management of the region as a forest reserve until the Forest Reserves Act of 1964, which provides "for the maintenance of water supply and the conservation of forests and other vegetation". Since the provincial government acquired the reserve, its area has slowly been reduced as other land-use regimes have been established in various smaller parcels of the land, such as the Willmore Wilderness Park, established in the 1950s, the three strict wilderness areas (Ghost River, Siffleur, and White Goat) established in the 1960s, the Kananaskis Country parks system, established in the 1970s, and the numerous small parks and recreation areas along the David Thompson corridor, established over several decades. In 1979, the McLean Creek watershed, along with the Ghost–Waiparous farther north, were designated Forest Land-Use Zones, where off-road vehicles (ORVs) are permitted, and since that time, ORV use in the area has expanded dramatically, causing groups such as the Ghost River Watershed Alliance and the public at large to express concern about stream-bed erosion and other disturbances.
