= Sheep River (Alberta) =

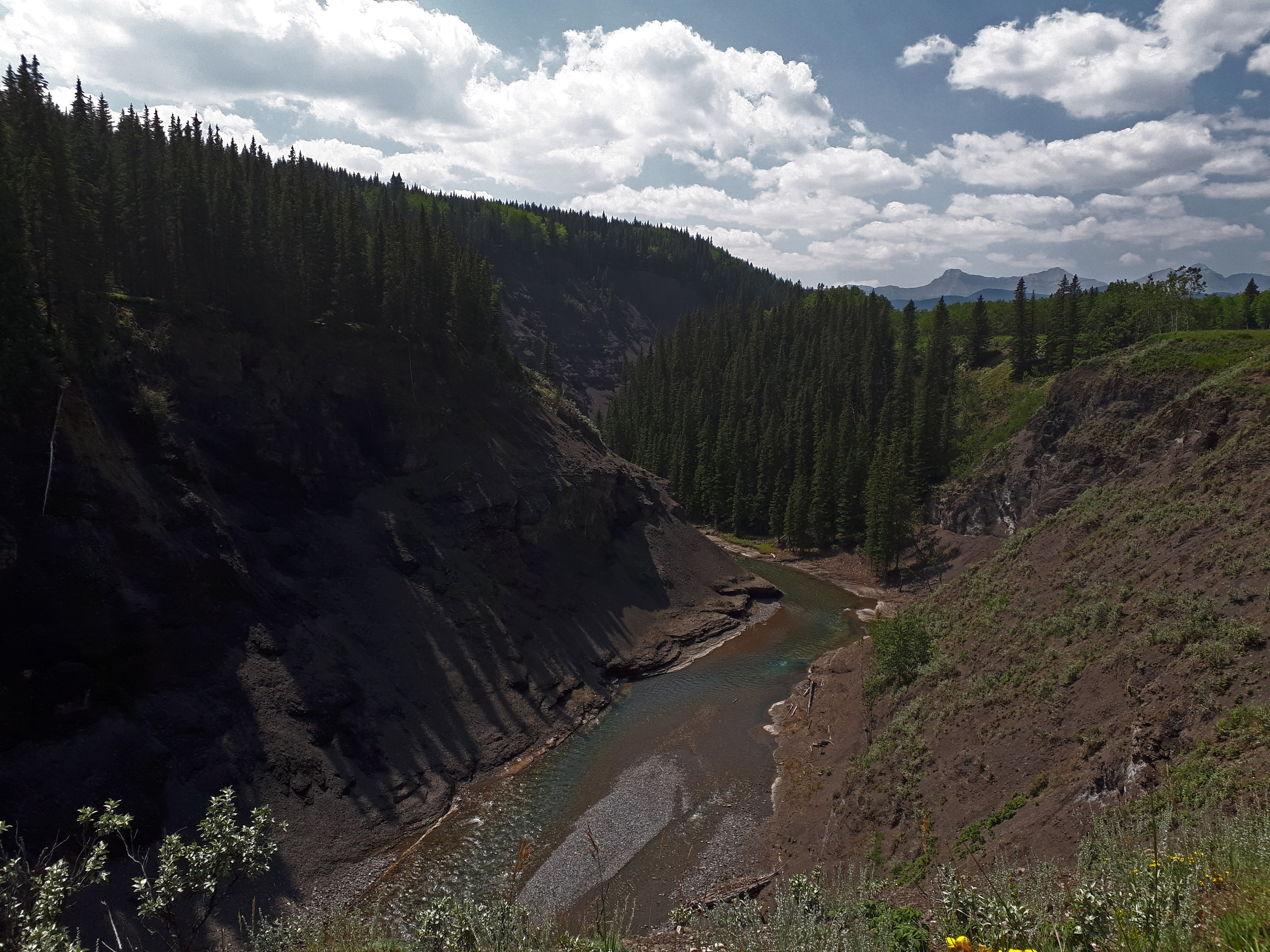
- The gorge of the Sheep River west of Diamond Valley

Location
- Country: Canada
- Province: Alberta

Physical characteristics
- Source
  - location: Elbow-Sheep Wildland Provincial Park
  - coordinates: 50.67278°N 114.95736°W
  - elevation: 2,100 meters (6,900 ft)
- Mouth
  - location: Highwood River
  - coordinates: 50.73998°N 113.85475°W
  - elevation: 983 meters (3,225 ft)
- Discharge
  - average: 6 m^{3}/s (210 cu ft/s) (at Diamond Valley)

The Sheep River is located in southwestern Alberta, Canada, and is part of the Bow River watershed. The river begins in the mountain valleys of Elbow-Sheep Wildland Provincial Park, passes through Sheep River Provincial Park, and joins the Highwood River about 8 km east of Okotoks. The Sheep River provides drinking water for the towns of Diamond Valley, and Okotoks.

== Tributaries ==
From origin to mouth, the Sheep River receives water from the following tributaries:

- Rae Creek (from Mount Rae)
- Burns Creek
- Cliff Creek
- Junction Creek
- Bluerock Creek
- Gorge Creek
- Dyson Creek
- March Creek
- Coal Creek
- Wolf Creek
- Long Prairie Creek
- Macabee Creek
- Waite Valley Creek
- Lineham Creek
- Turner Valley
- Threepoint Creek
- Spring Creek
- Wilson Coulee

== See also ==
- List of rivers of Alberta
