= Sheep River Provincial Park =

Provincial park in Alberta, Canada

- Sheep River Falls near the headwaters of the Sheep River

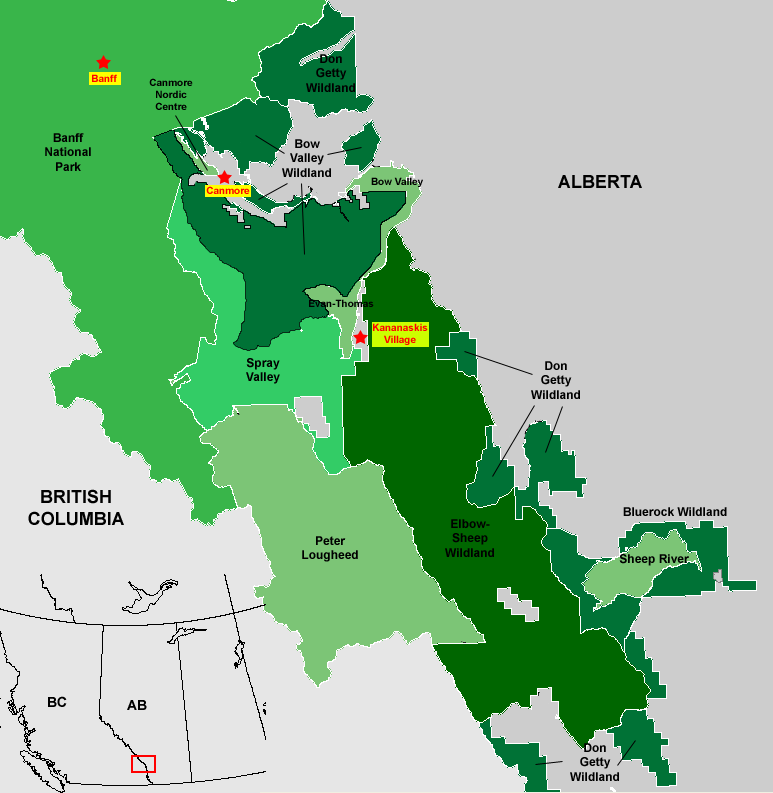
- Location within Kananaskis park system
- Interactive map of Sheep River Provincial Park
- Location: Kananaskis, Alberta, Canada
- Nearest city: Turner Valley
- Coordinates: 50°40′N 114°40′W
- Area: 60.2 km^{2} (23.2 sq mi)
- Governing body: Alberta Tourism, Parks and Recreation, Kananaskis Country Campgrounds

Sheep River Provincial Park is a provincial park located in Alberta, Canada, 23 kilometres (14 mi) west of Diamond Valley on highway 546. It is part of the Kananaskis Country park system and encompasses a portion of the Sheep River valley.

Located on the eastern slopes of the Rocky Mountains, the park includes the Sheep River Wildlife Sanctuary, which provides permanent habitat for bighorn sheep, while the eastern part of the reserve extends to the Foothills Natural Region, offering summer range for elk and deer.

== Activities ==
The following activities are available in the park:

- Camping at Sandy McNabb and Bluerock campgrounds.
- Cross-country skiing on the Sandy McNabb trails.
- Fishing for brown, bull, cutthroat and rainbow trout, longnose dace, northern pearl dace, longnose sucker, mountain sucker, mountain whitefish and spoonhead sculpin on the Sheep River.
- Hiking on a wide variety of trails: 9999, Bighorn, Bluerock, Bluerock Creek, Curley Sands, Death Valley, Foran Grade, Gorge Creek, Green Mountain, Hog's Back, Indian Oils, Junction Creek, Junction Mountain, Link Creek, Missinglink, Mist Creek, Mount McNabb, North Fork, Phone Line, Price Camp, Sandy McNabb, Sheep, South Gorge Creek, Threepoint Creek, Threepoint Mountain, Volcano Creek, Volcano Ridge, Ware Creek, Wildhorse, Windy Point, Wolf Creek.
- Horseback riding on most trails.
- Ice skating at Sandy McNabb campground.
- Mountain biking on most trails.

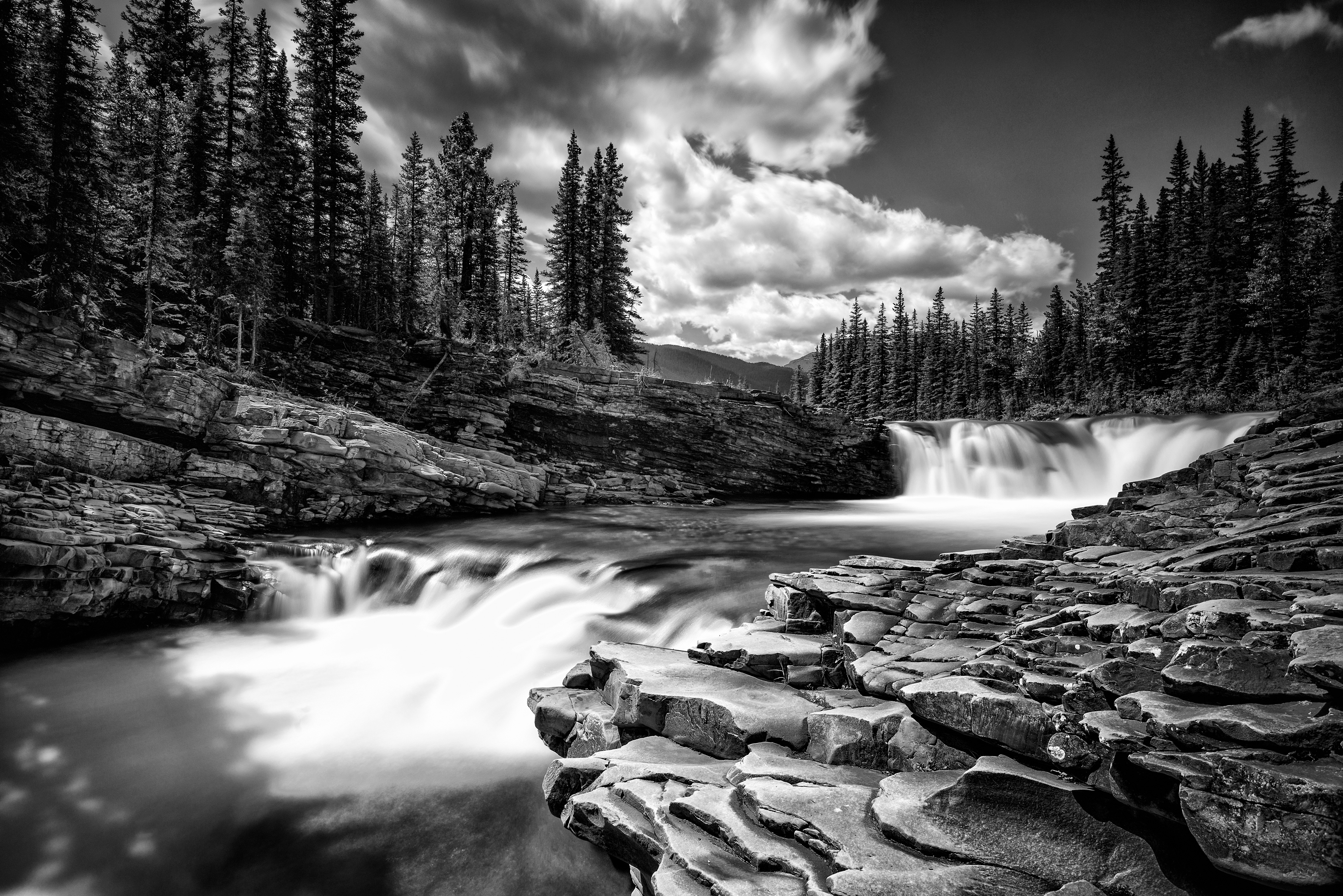
Long exposure photograph of the Sheep River Falls, a popular site among locals in the vicinity of Calgary, AB (1.5 hr. trip) and near the town of Turner Valley.

== See also ==
- List of provincial parks in Alberta
- List of Canadian provincial parks
- List of National Parks of Canada
