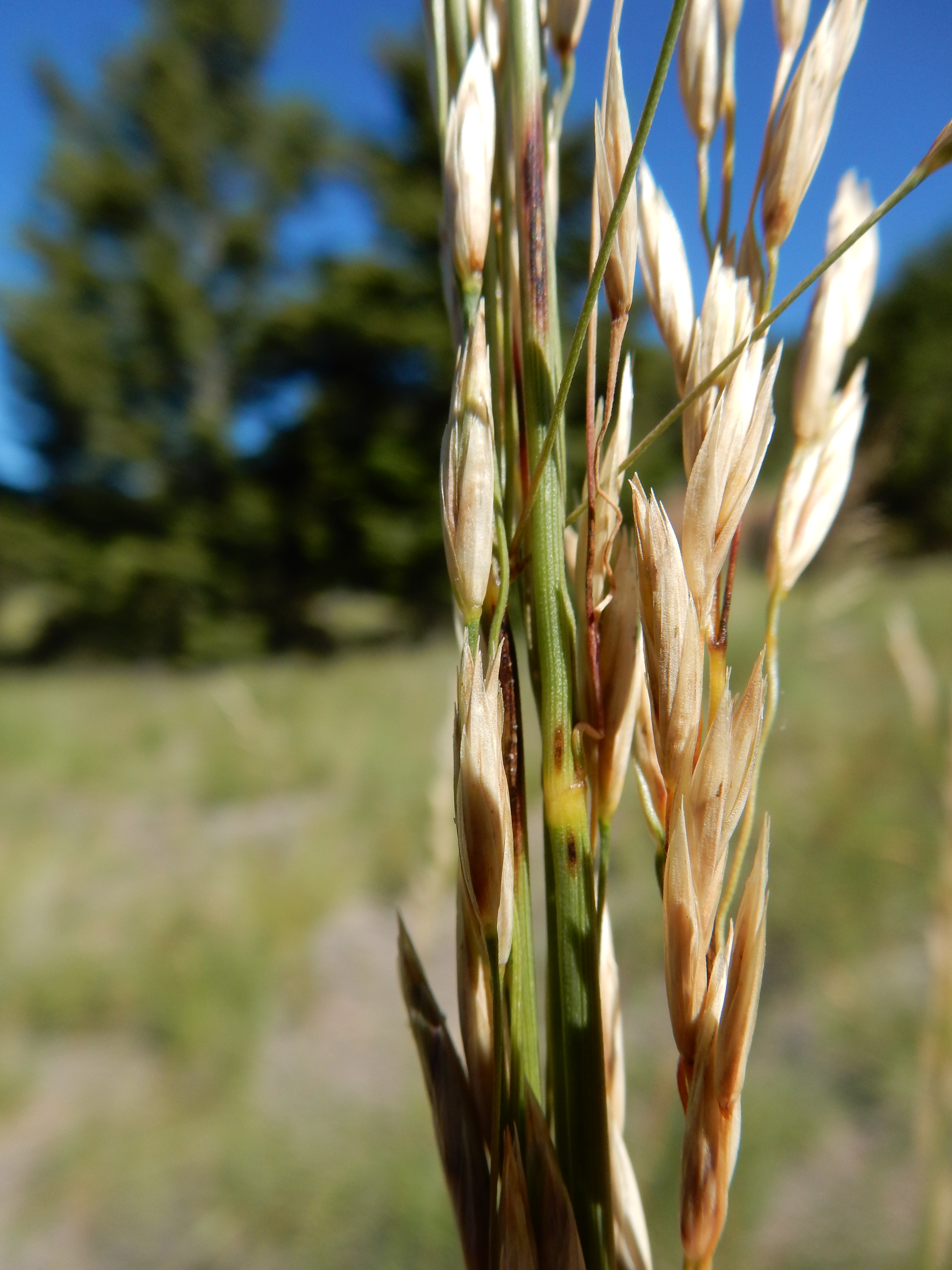
- Festuca campestris near Silver Bow Creek, Montana

Scientific classification
- Kingdom: Plantae
- Clade: Tracheophytes
- Clade: Angiosperms
- Clade: Monocots
- Clade: Commelinids
- Order: Poales
- Family: Poaceae
- Subfamily: Pooideae
- Genus: Festuca
- Species: F. campestris

Binomial name
- Festuca campestris Hack.

= Festuca campestris =

Species of grass

Festuca campestris, also known as the mountain rough fescue, is a species of grass in the family Poaceae. This species prefer subalpine grasslands and grow in higher elevations. Festuca campestris is endemic to southern British Columbia, Alberta, and southwestern Saskatchewan south through Washington, Oregon, Idaho, and Montana. It was first described in 1900 by Eduard Hackel.
