= Elbow-Sheep Wildland Provincial Park =

Provincial park in Alberta, Canada

- IUCN category Ib (wilderness area)
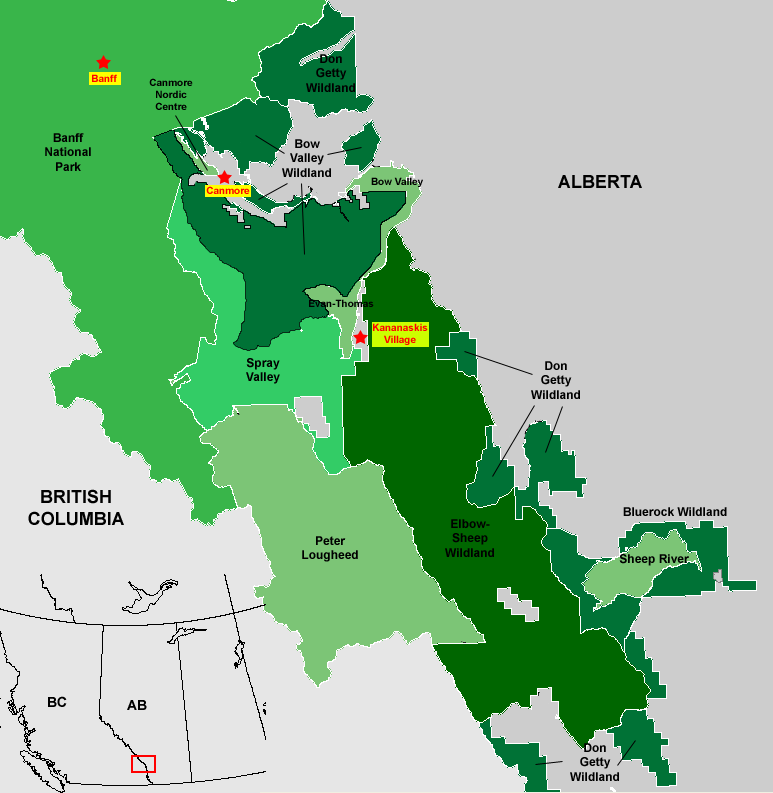
- Location within Kananaskis park system
- Location: Kananaskis, Alberta, Canada
- Nearest city: Calgary
- Coordinates: 50°42′N 115°00′W
- Area: 816.07 km^{2} (315.09 sq mi)
- Established: January 10, 1996
- Governing body: Alberta Tourism, Parks and Recreation

Elbow-Sheep Wildland Provincial Park is a provincial park and wildlife reserve located in the Kananaskis Country in south-western Alberta, Canada. It is within the Canadian Rocky Mountains.

== Activities ==
The park offers setting for hiking, mountain biking and horseback riding through mountain landscapes of lodgepole pine and spruce forests.

== Photo gallery ==
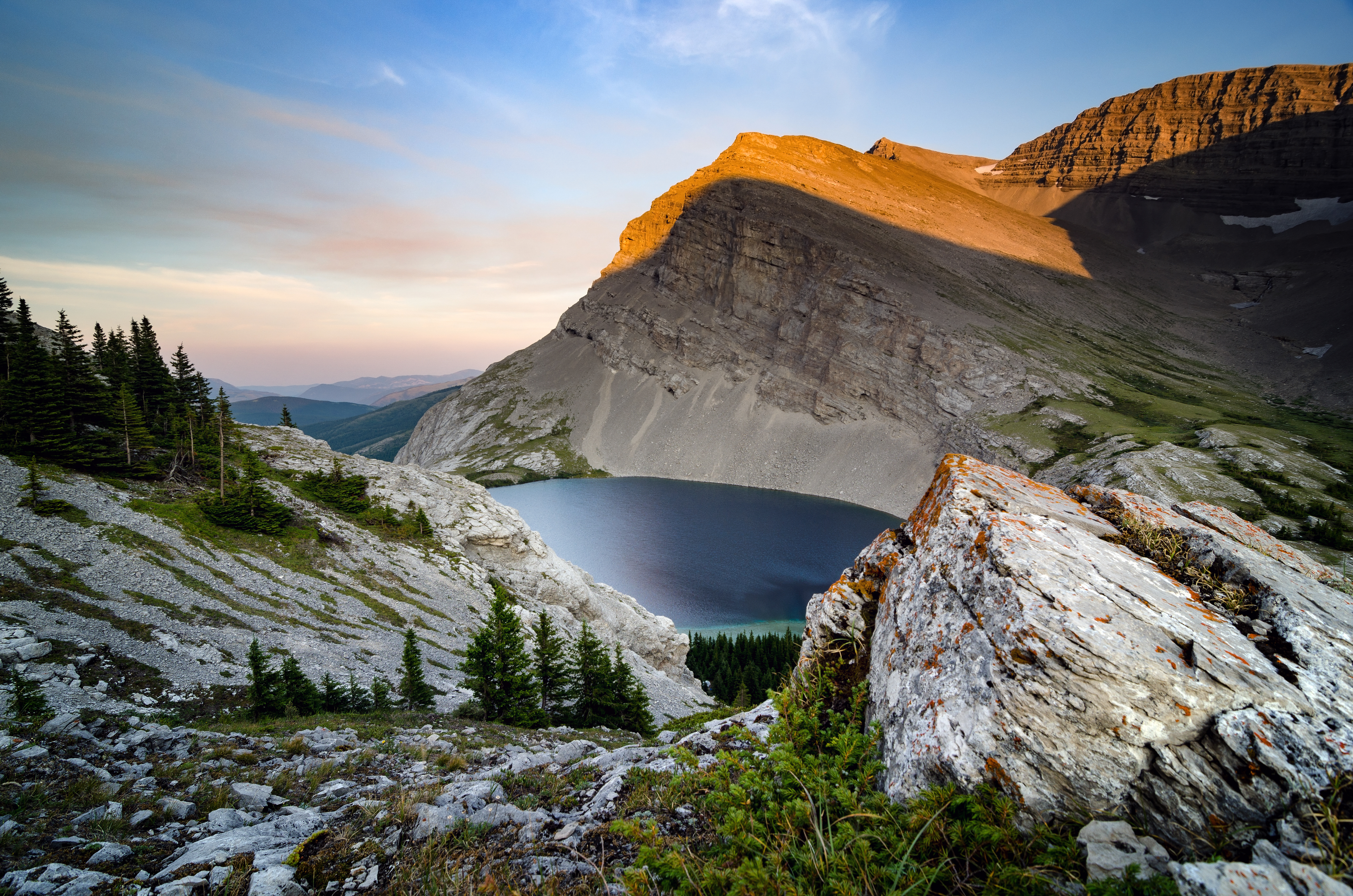
Carnarvon Lake

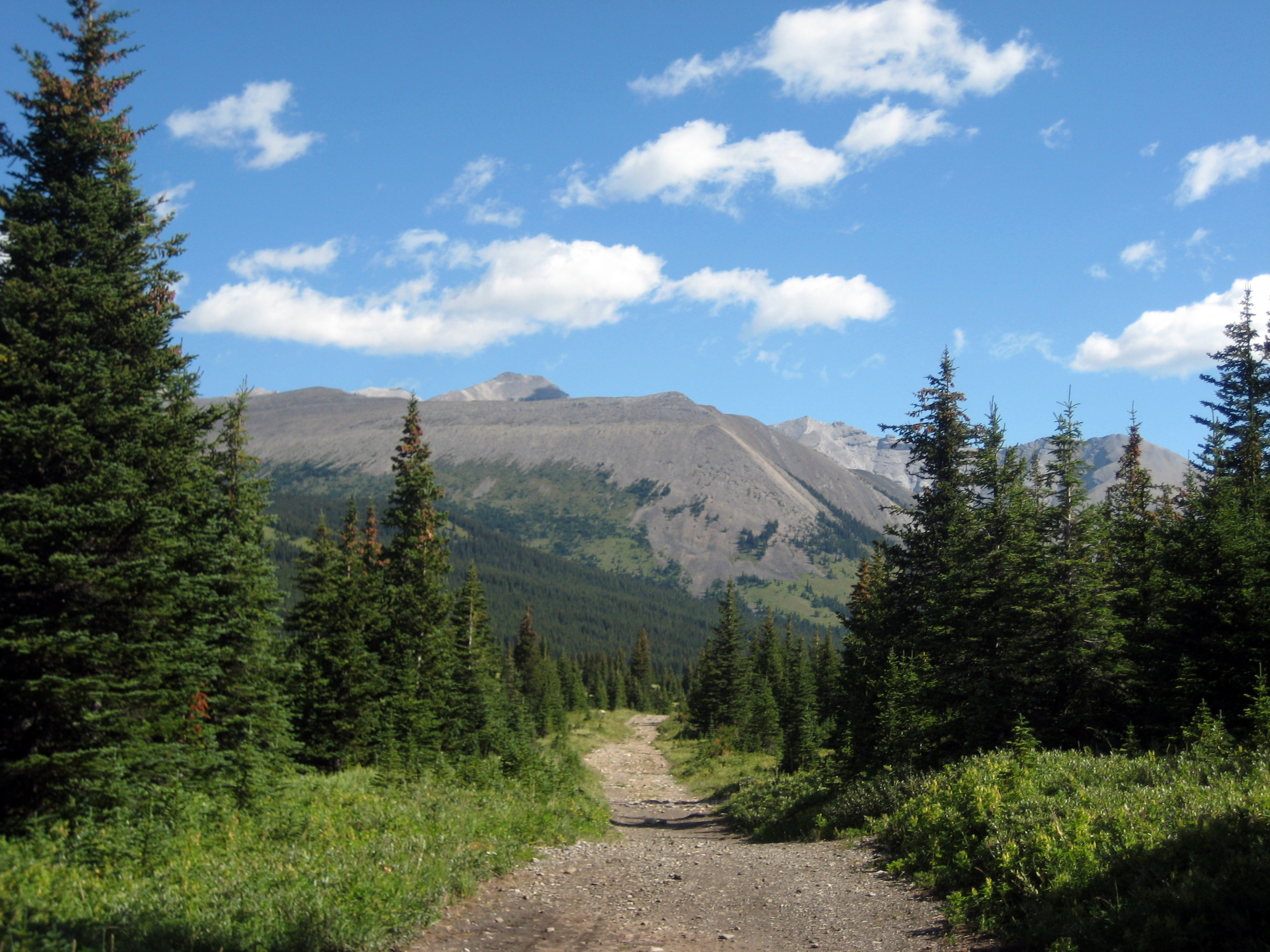
August 2007

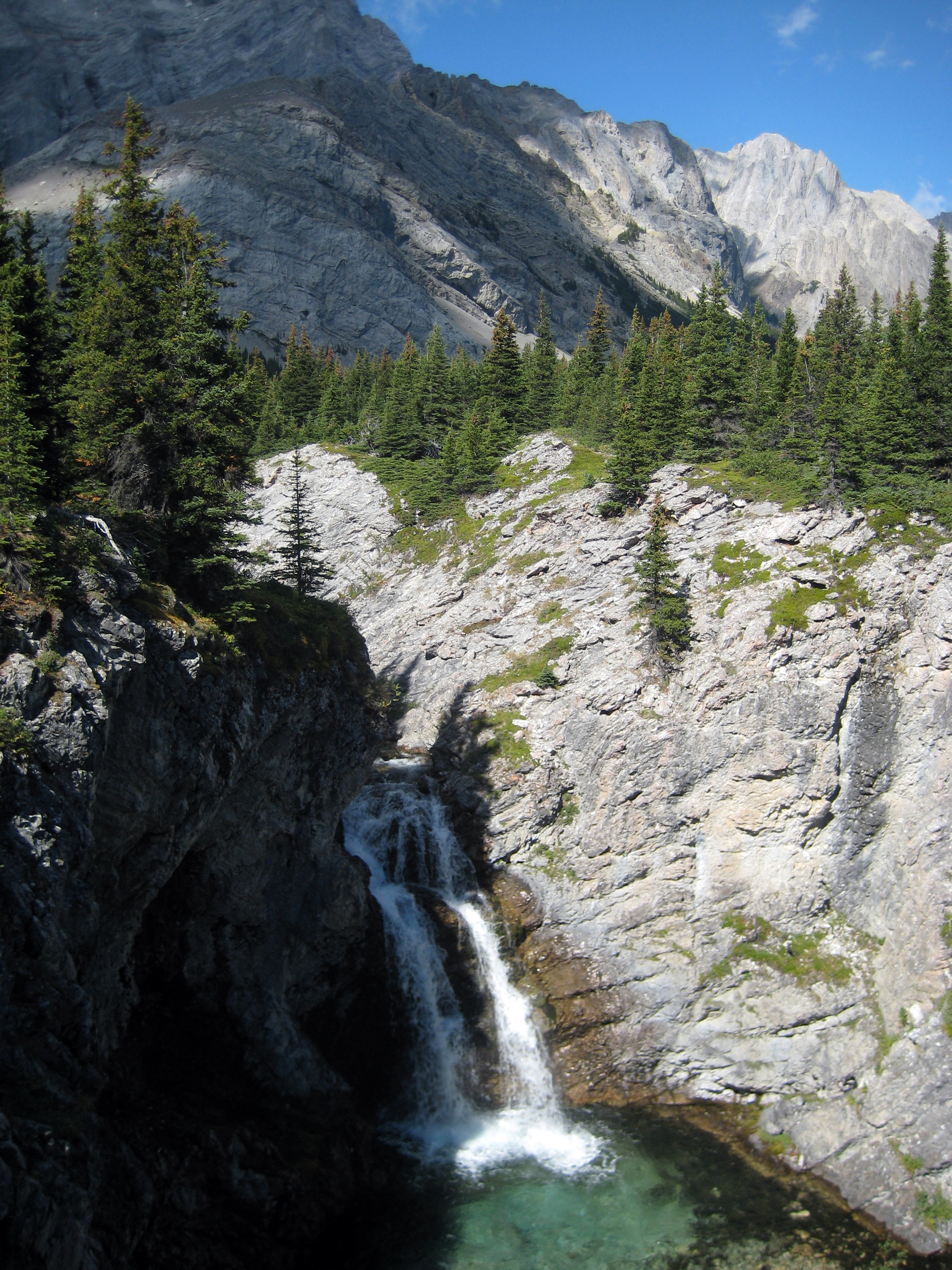
Waterfalls - August 2007

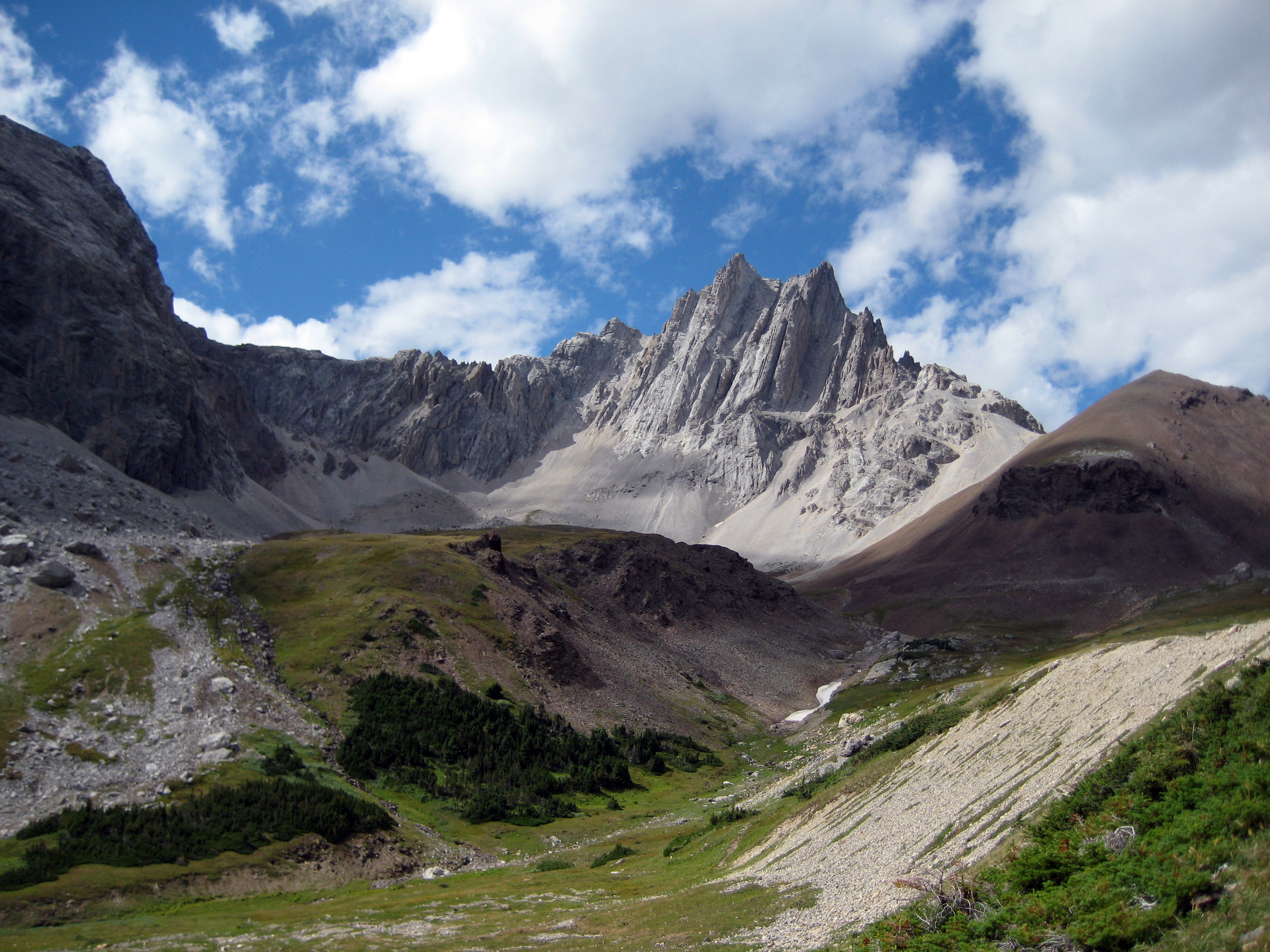
Cat's Ears - August 2007

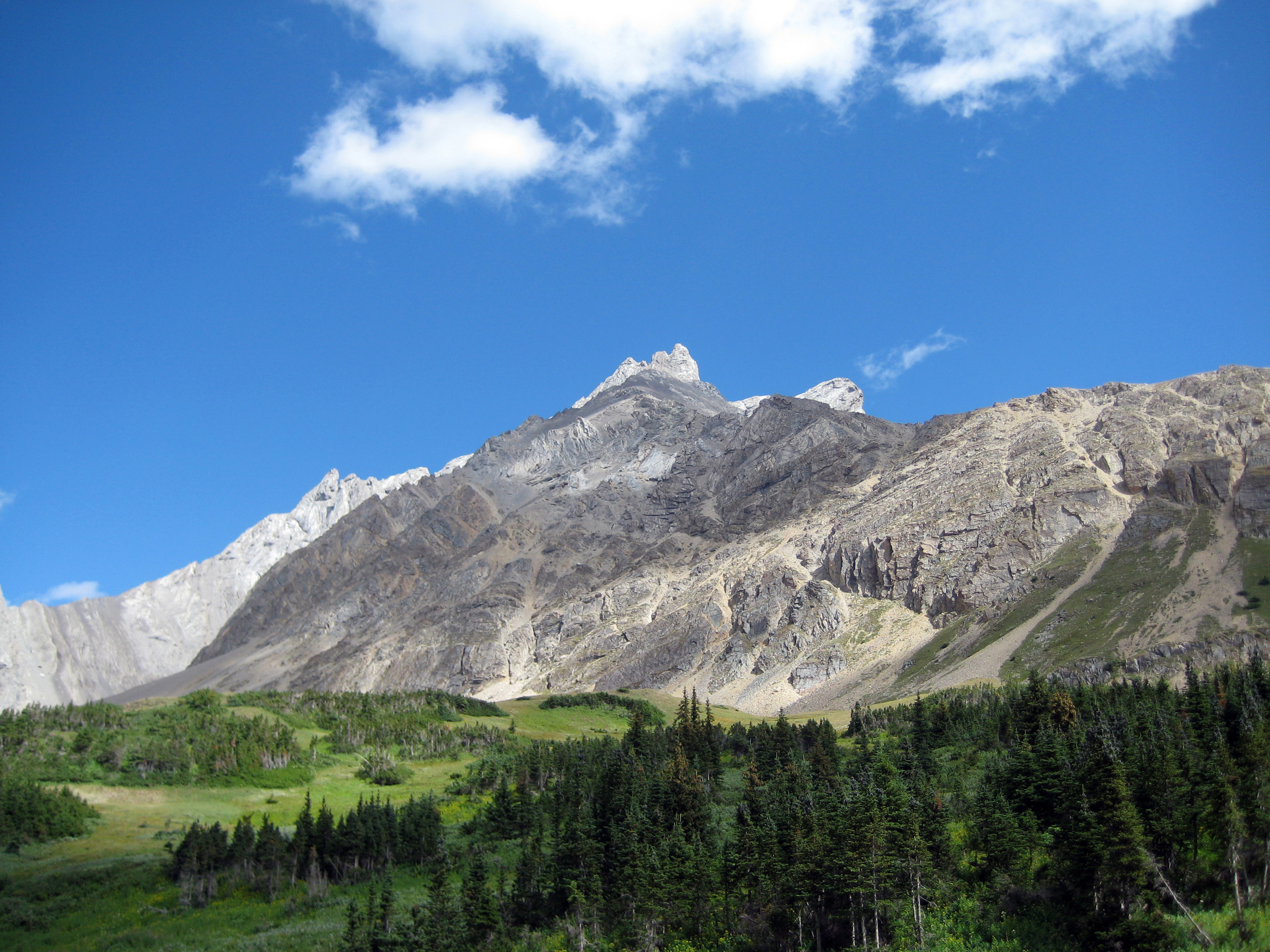
August 2007

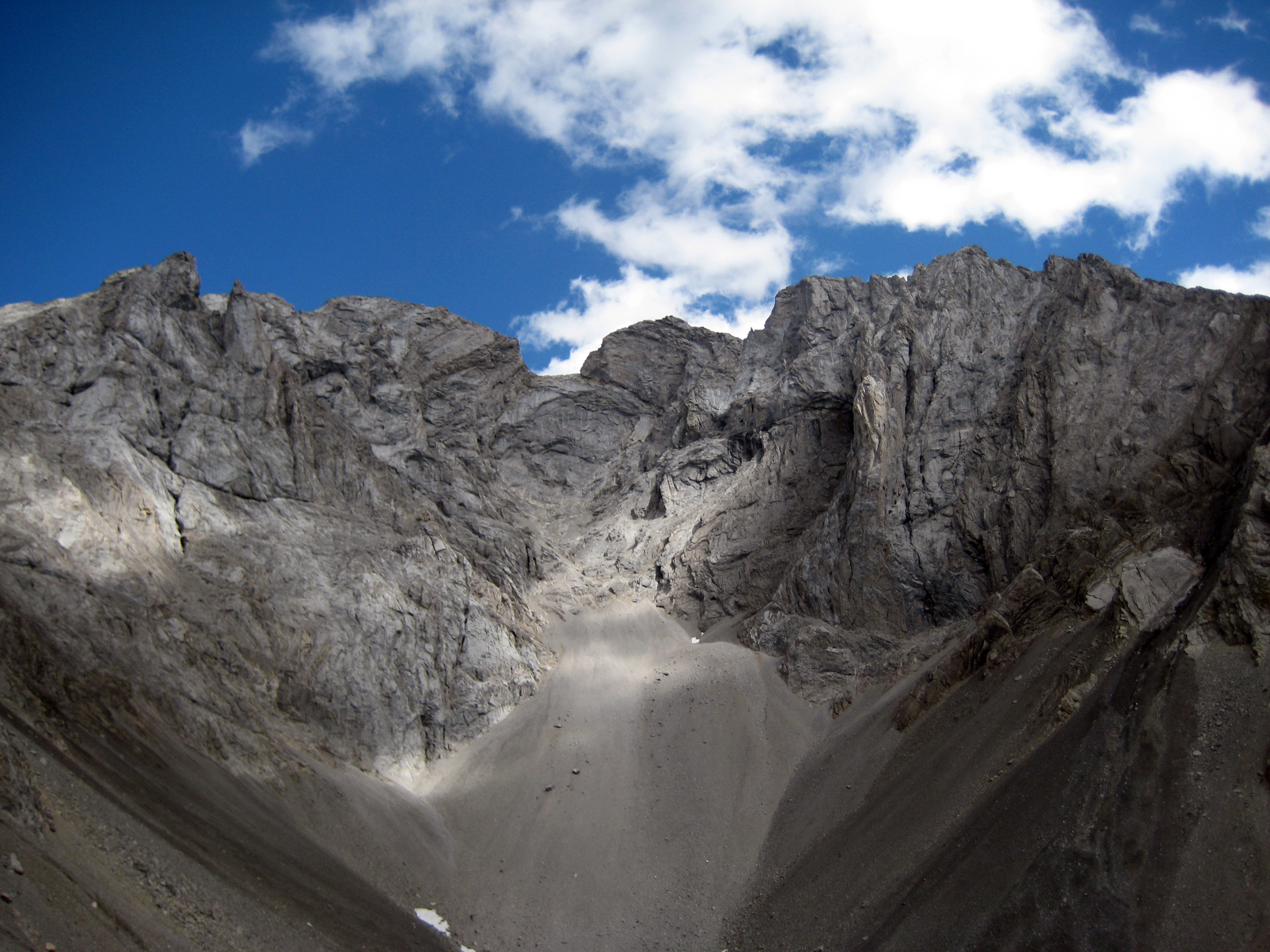
August 2007

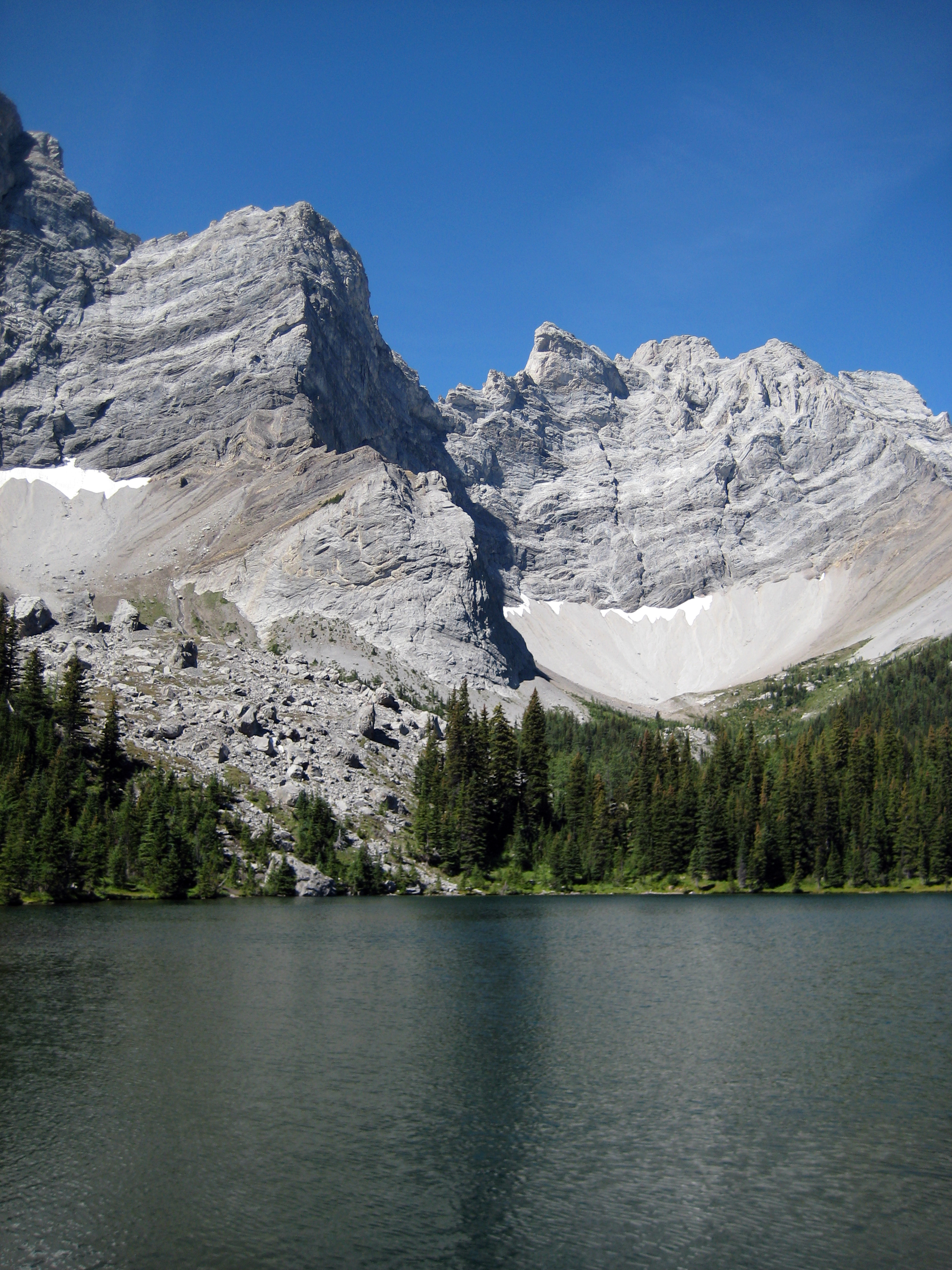
August 2007

== See also ==
- List of provincial parks in Alberta
- List of Canadian provincial parks
