= The Tower (Alberta) =

Prominent peak that sits above Rummel Lake Alberta, Canada

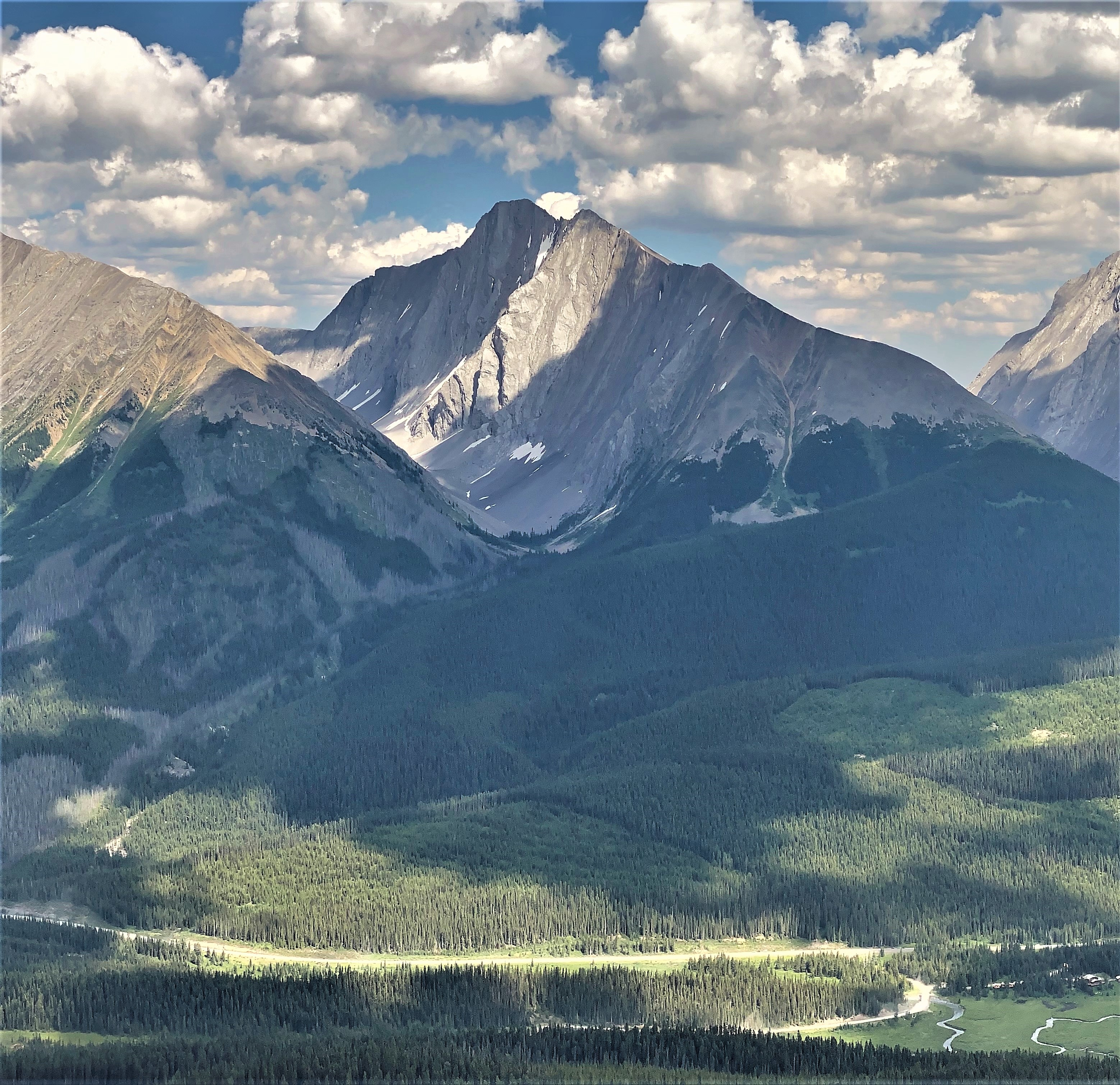
- West aspect, viewed from Tent Ridge

Highest point
- Elevation: 3,117 m (10,226 ft)
- Prominence: 618 m (2,028 ft)
- Parent peak: Mount Bogart (3144 m)
- Listing: Mountains of Alberta
- Coordinates: 50°51′24″N 115°17′22″W

Geography
- Location within Alberta
- Country: Canada
- Province: Alberta
- Parent range: Kananaskis Range
- Topo map: NTS 82J14 Spray Lakes Reservoir

Climbing
- First ascent: Unknown

The Tower is the unofficial name for a large prominent peak that sits above Rummel Lake. It is located between Mount Engadine and Mount Galatea of the Kananaskis Range in Alberta, Canada.

== Geology ==
The Tower is composed of sedimentary rock laid down during the Precambrian to Jurassic periods. Formed in shallow seas, this sedimentary rock was pushed east and over the top of younger rock during the Laramide orogeny.

== Climate ==
Based on the Köppen climate classification, The Tower is located in a subarctic climate zone with cold, snowy winters, and mild summers. Temperatures can drop below −20 °C with wind chill factors below −30 °C.
