= Mary Barclay's Mountain =

Mountain in Alberta, Canada

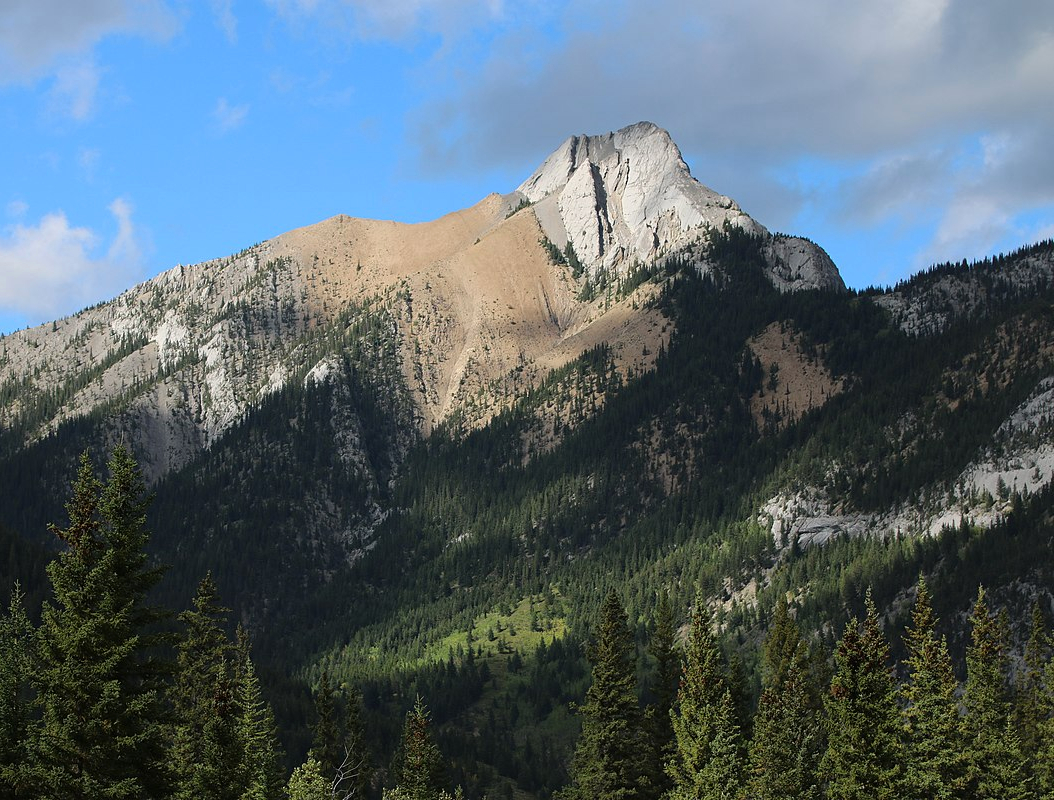
- Mary Barclay's Mountain

Highest point
- Elevation: 2,260 m (7,410 ft)
- Prominence: 160 m (520 ft)
- Parent peak: Skogan Peak (2662 m)
- Listing: Mountains of Alberta
- Coordinates: 50°59′58″N 115°06′15″W

Geography
- Location within Alberta Location within Canada
- Location: Alberta, Canada
- Parent range: Kananaskis Range; Canadian Rockies
- Topo map: NTS 82J14 Spray Lakes Reservoir

Geology
- Rock age: Cambrian
- Rock type: Limestone

Climbing
- Easiest route: Scramble via south ridge

Mary Barclay's Mountain is a 2,260-metre (7,410-foot) summit located in the Kananaskis Range of the Canadian Rockies of Alberta, Canada. Mary Barclay's Mountain can be seen from Highway 40 in Kananaskis Country. The mountain's nearest higher neighbour is Skogan Peak, 3.0 km (1.9 mi) to the west, and Mount Lorette is to the immediate southwest.

== History ==
This summit honours Mary Belle Barclay (1912–1983), who founded the first of the Canadian Youth Hostels in 1933 at Bragg Creek near Calgary, Alberta. With her sister, Catherine, together they officially founded and registered the Canadian Youth Hostel Association in 1938.

== Geology ==
Mary Barclay's Mountain is composed of sedimentary rock laid down during the Precambrian to Jurassic periods. Formed in shallow seas, this sedimentary rock was pushed east and over the top of younger rock during the Laramide orogeny.

== Climate ==
Based on the Köppen climate classification, Mary Barclay's Mountain is located in a subarctic climate zone with cold, snowy winters, and mild summers. Temperatures can drop below −20 °C with wind chill factors below −30 °C. Precipitation runoff from the mountain drains into the Kananaskis River which is a tributary of the Bow River.

== Gallery ==
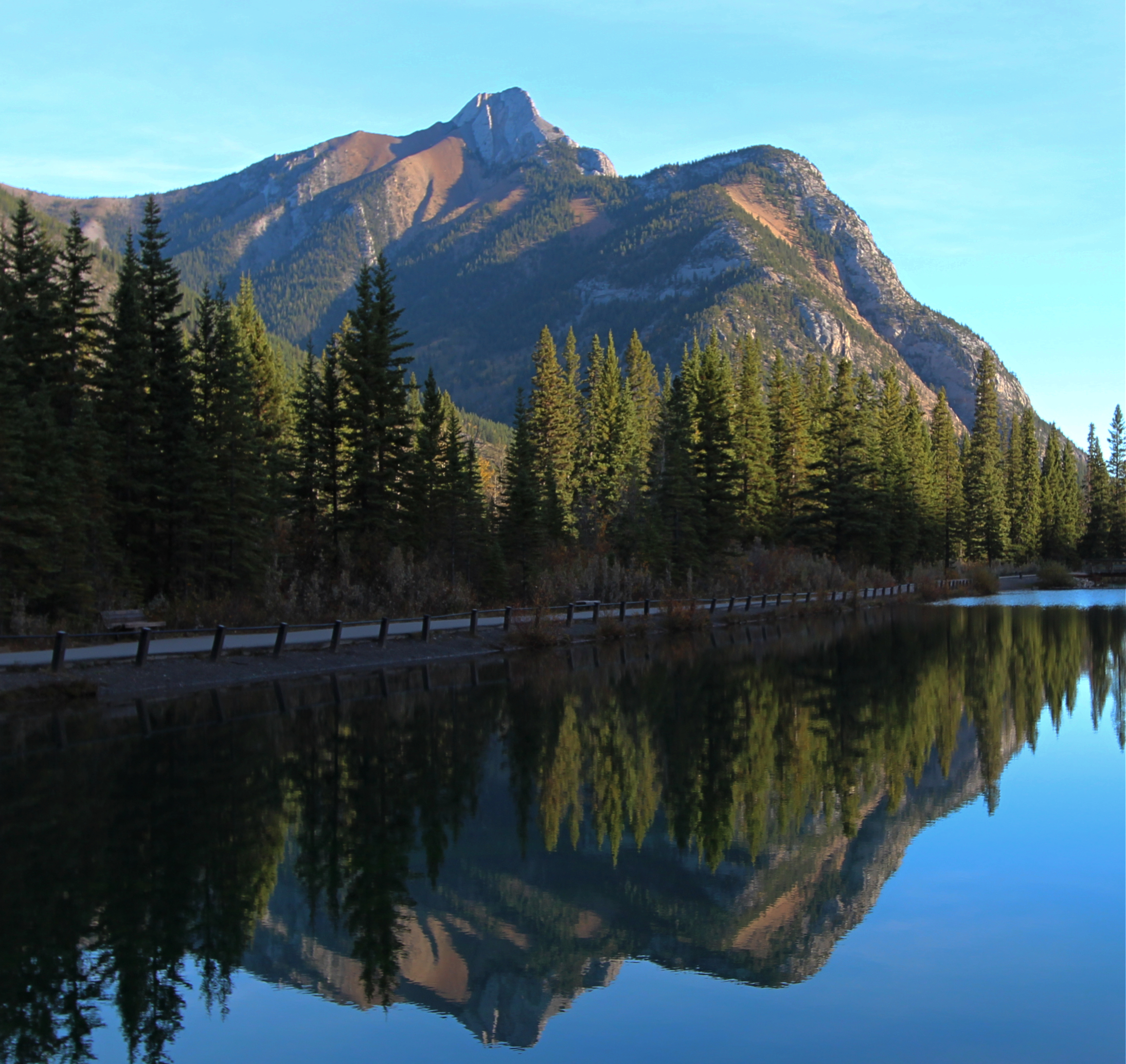
Mary Barclay's Mountain seen from Mount Lorette Ponds

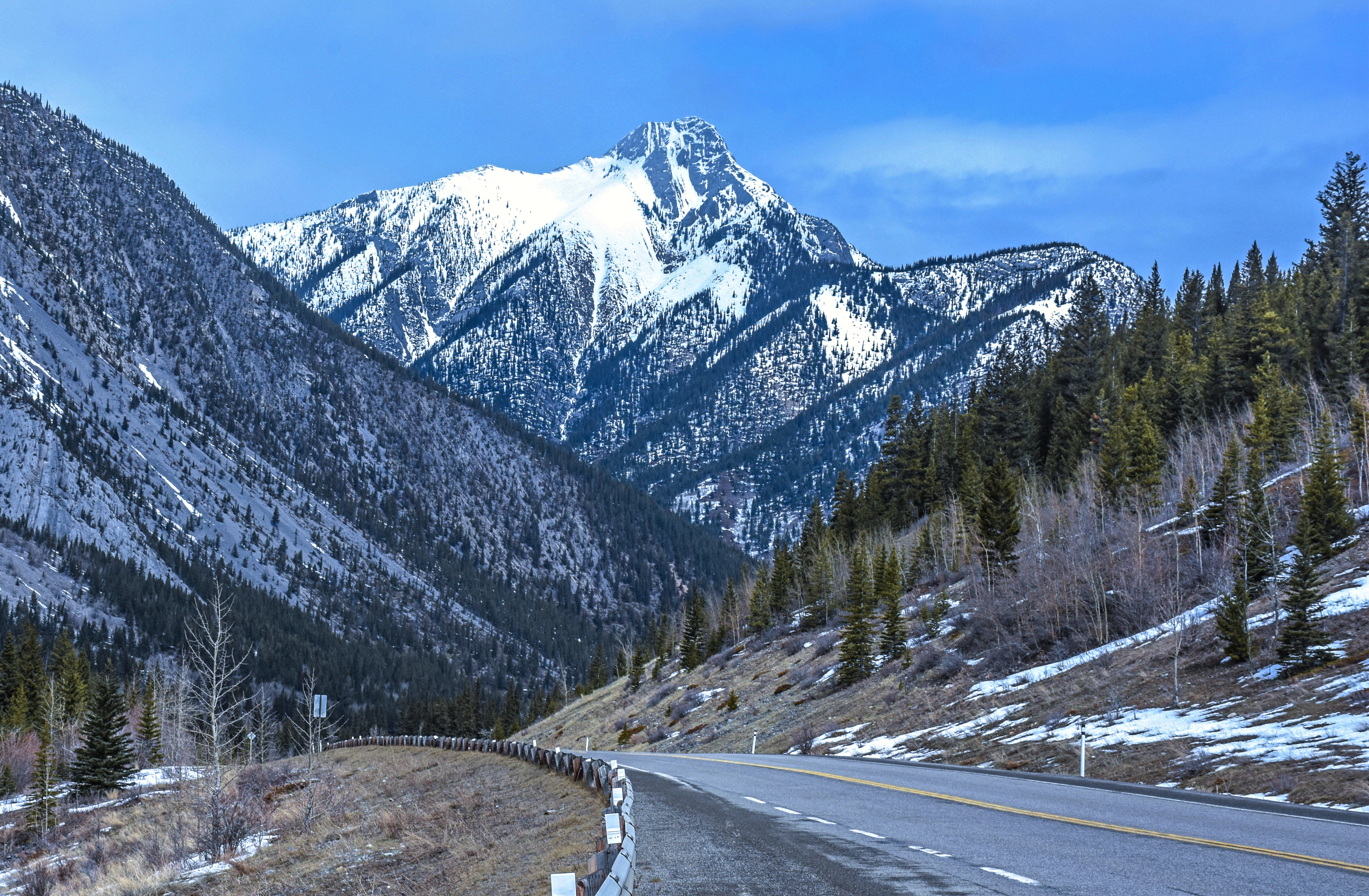
Mary Barclays Mountain from Highway 40

== See also ==
- Alberta's Rockies
- List of mountains of Canada
