= Mount Inflexible =

Mountain in Alberta, Canada

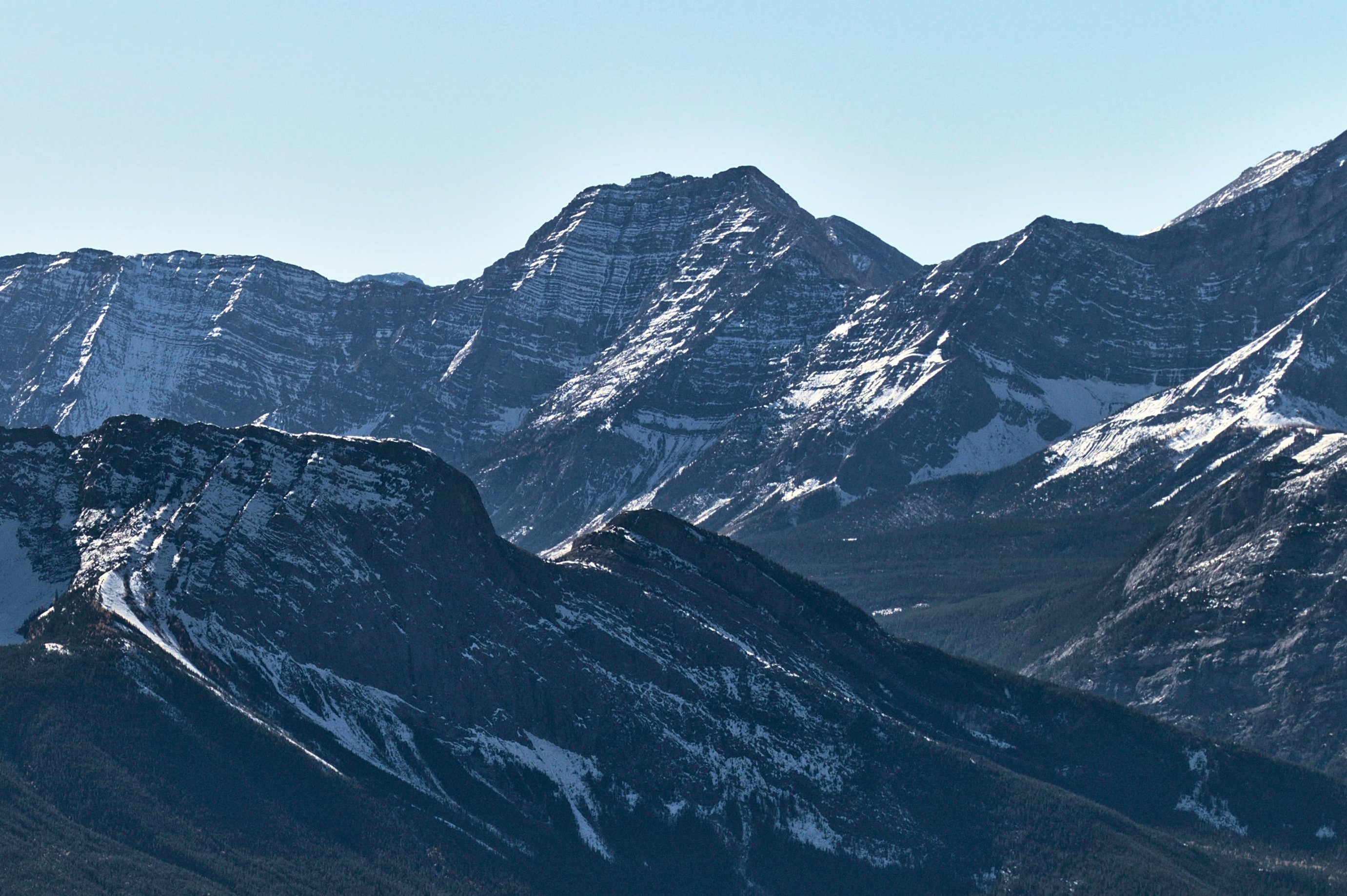
- North aspect

Highest point
- Elevation: 3,000 m (9,800 ft)
- Prominence: 379 m (1,243 ft)
- Parent peak: Mount James Walker (3035 m)
- Listing: Mountains of Alberta
- Coordinates: 50°46′55″N 115°12′24″W

Geography
- Location within Alberta
- Location: Alberta, Canada
- Parent range: Kananaskis Range
- Topo map: NTS 82J14 Spray Lakes Reservoir

Climbing
- First ascent: 1956 Brian Greenwood, R. Lofthouse

Mount Inflexible is a mountain in the Kananaskis Range of Alberta, Canada. It was named in 1922 after HMS Inflexible, a battlecruiser of the Royal Navy serving during the First World War.

== Geology ==
Mount Inflexible is composed of sedimentary rock laid down during the Precambrian to Jurassic periods. Formed in shallow seas, this sedimentary rock was pushed east and over the top of younger rock during the Laramide orogeny.

== Climate ==
Based on the Köppen climate classification, Mount Inflexible is located in a subarctic climate zone with cold, snowy winters, and mild summers. Winter temperatures can drop below −20 °C (−4 °F) with wind chill factors below −30 °C (−22 °F).

== See also ==
- Geography of Alberta
