= Wind Mountain =

Mountain in Alberta, Canada

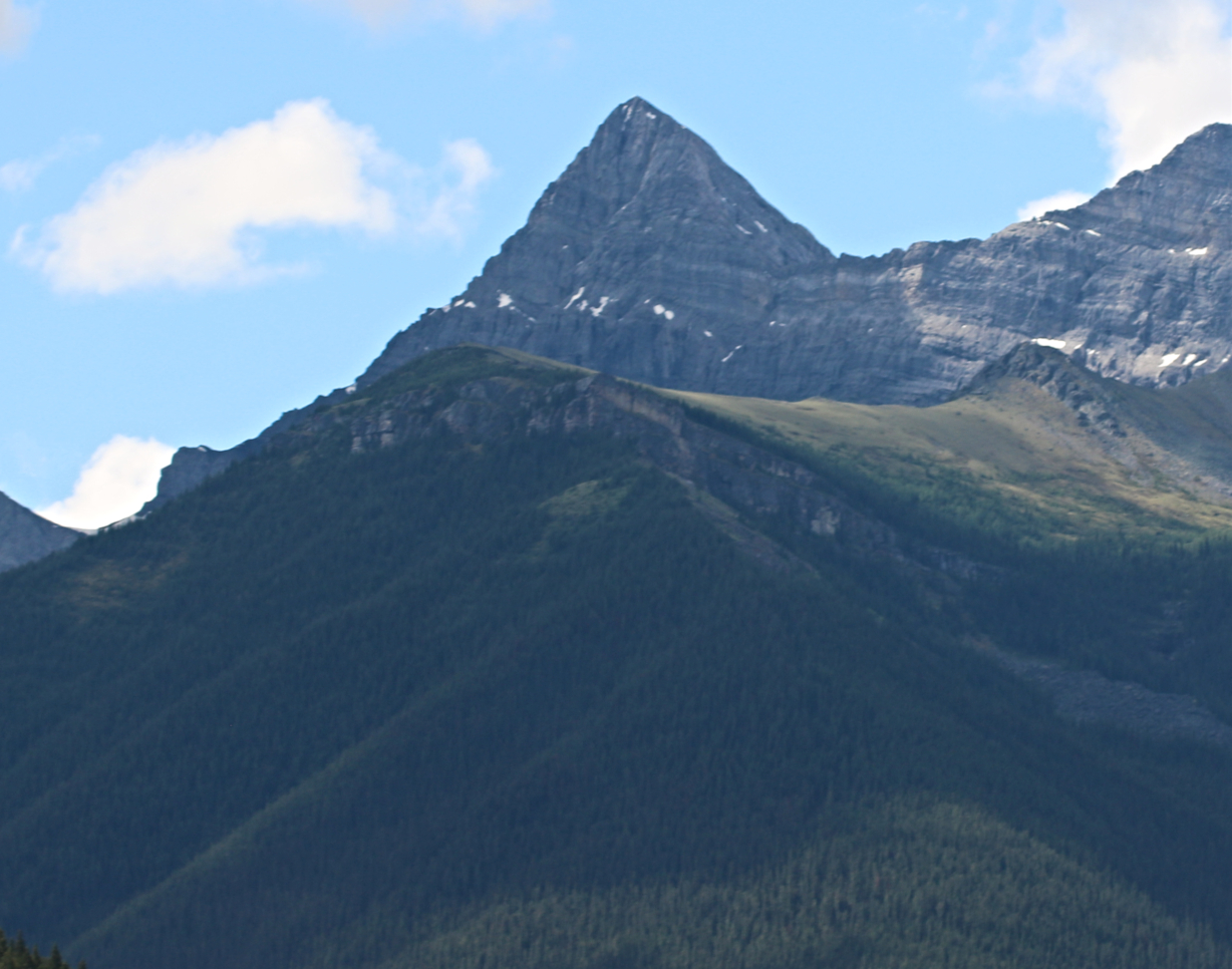
- Wind Mountain seen from Bow Valley

Highest point
- Elevation: 3,153 m (10,344 ft)
- Prominence: 745 m (2,444 ft)
- Parent peak: Mount Galatea (3185 m)
- Listing: Mountains of Alberta
- Coordinates: 50°57′15″N 115°14′46″W

Geography
- Location within Alberta Location within Canada
- Interactive map of Wind Mountain
- Country: Canada
- Province: Alberta
- Parent range: Kananaskis Range; Canadian Rockies
- Topo map: NTS 82J14 Spray Lakes Reservoir

Geology
- Rock age: Cambrian
- Rock type: Limestone

Wind Mountain is a 3,153-metre (10,344-foot) mountain summit located in Kananaskis Country in the Canadian Rockies of Alberta, Canada. Wind Mountain's nearest higher peak is Mount Galatea, 13.0 km (8.1 mi) to the south, and both are part of the Kananaskis Range. Wind Mountain can be seen from the Trans-Canada Highway in the Bow River valley, and from Highway 40.

== History ==
Wind Mountain was a massif with four peaks when originally named by Eugene Bourgeau of the Palliser Expedition in 1858, but three of the four peaks were renamed Mount Lougheed in 1928 after Sir James Lougheed's family pressured the government to name the peak in honor of him following his death. The present day Wind Mountain (highest of the four) was later named in 1983 to honor Bourgeau's original naming. Bourgeau so named the mountain because clouds were gathering and curling around its high peaks.

The mountain's name was officially adopted in 1985 by the Geographical Names Board of Canada.

== Geology ==
Wind Mountain is composed of sedimentary rock laid down during the Precambrian to Jurassic periods. Formed in shallow seas, this sedimentary rock was pushed east and over the top of younger rock during the Laramide orogeny.

== Climate ==
Based on the Köppen climate classification, Wind Mountain is located in a subarctic climate with cold, snowy winters, and mild summers. Temperatures can drop below −20 °C with wind chill factors below −30 °C in winter. The months July through September offer the most favorable weather for viewing and climbing this mountain. Precipitation runoff from the mountain drains into tributaries of the Bow River.

== Gallery ==
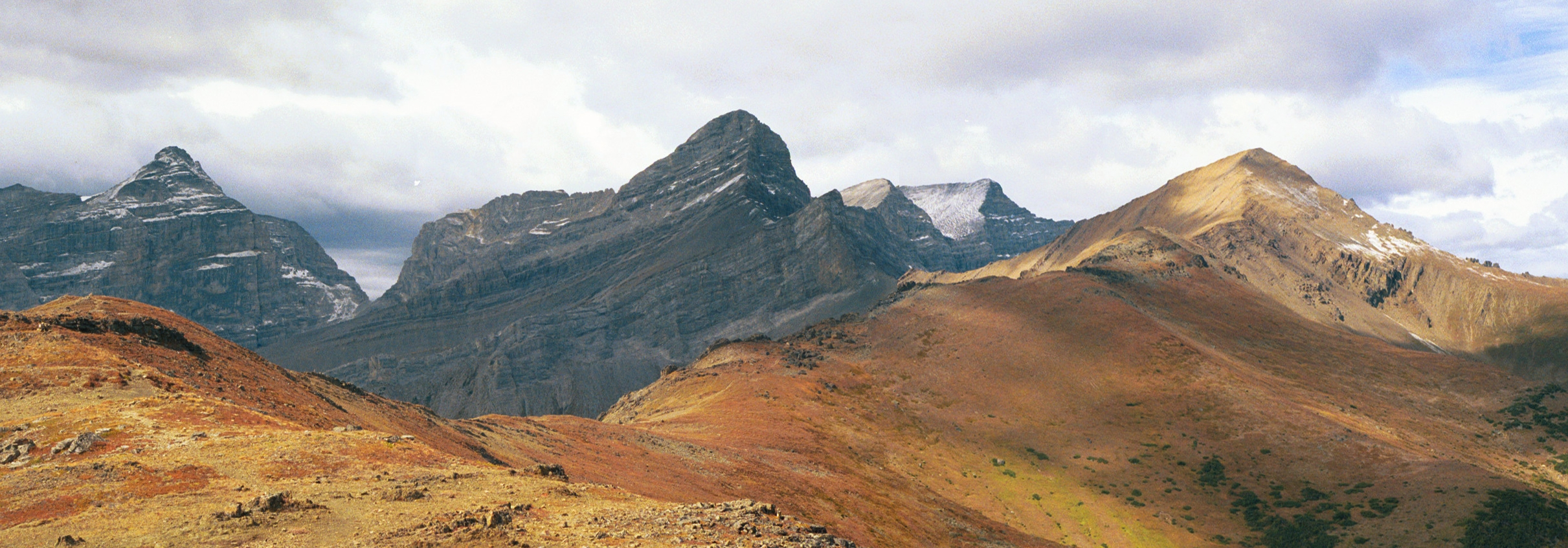
Wind Mountain (centered), from Mount Allan

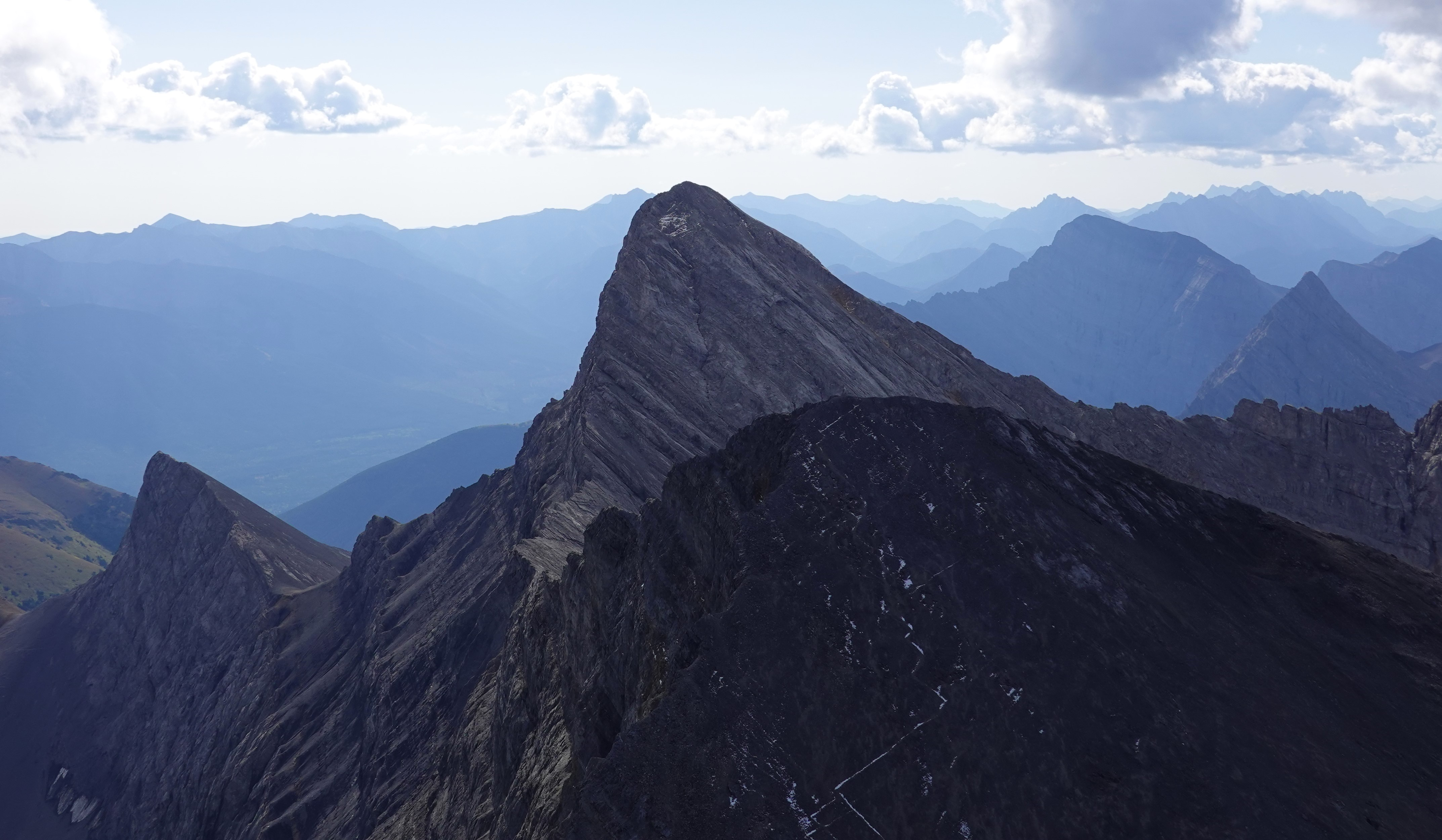
Wind Mountain seen from Mount Lougheed

== See also ==
- Mountains of Alberta
- Geography of Alberta
- List of mountains of Canada
- Geology of Alberta
