= Mount Buller (disambiguation) =

Mount Buller, Victoria is a town in Australia.

Mount Buller may also refer to:

- Mount Buller (Victoria), a mountain in Australia, site of the town of Mount Buller
- Mount Buller Alpine Resort, a ski resort on Mount Buller
- Mount Buller (Alberta), a mountain in Canada
