= Mount Lawson (Alberta) =

Mountain in Alberta, Canada

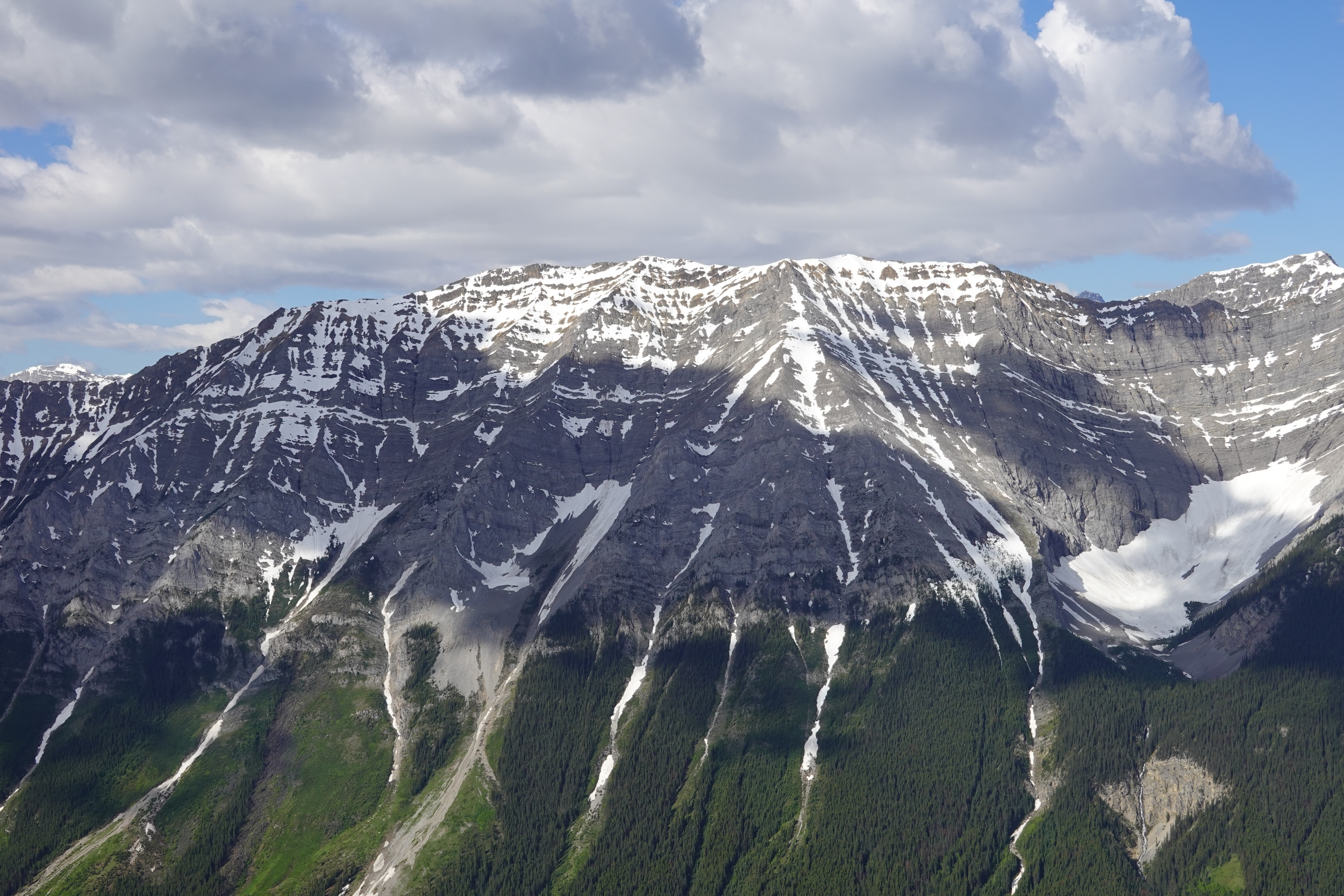
- East aspect

Highest point
- Elevation: 2,795 m (9,170 ft)
- Prominence: 113 m (371 ft)
- Listing: Mountains of Alberta
- Coordinates: 50°45′59″N 115°11′27″W

Geography
- Location within Alberta
- Country: Canada
- Province: Alberta
- Parent range: Kananaskis Range
- Topo map: NTS 82J14 Spray Lakes Reservoir

Climbing
- Easiest route: A moderate scramble via east-facing rubble slopes

Mount Lawson is a mountain located in the Kananaskis Range of Alberta. It was named in 1922 by Walter Wilcox and H.G. Bryant after Major W.E. Lawson, an employee with the Geological Survey of Canada who was killed in France during World War I.
