= Mount James Walker =

Mountain in Alberta, Canada

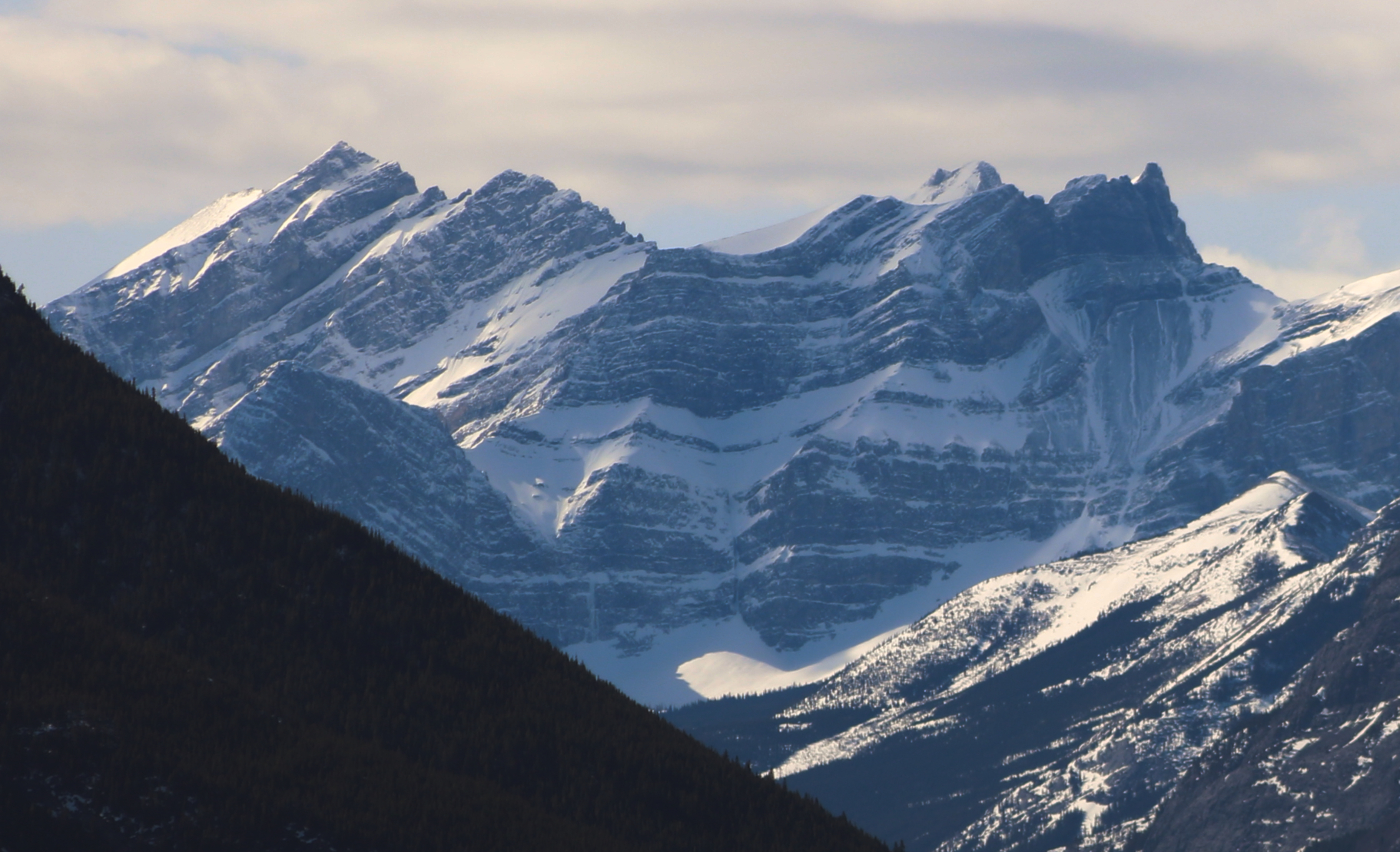
- Mount James Walker seen from the north

Highest point
- Elevation: 3,035 m (9,957 ft)
- Prominence: 322 m (1,056 ft)
- Parent peak: Mount Galatea (3185 m)
- Listing: Mountains of Alberta
- Coordinates: 50°48′17″N 115°13′13″W

Geography
- Location within Alberta Location within Canada
- Country: Canada
- Province: Alberta
- Protected area: Spray Valley Provincial Park
- Parent range: Kananaskis Range; Canadian Rockies
- Topo map: NTS 82J14 Spray Lakes Reservoir

Geology
- Rock age: Cambrian
- Rock type: sedimentary rock

Mount James Walker is a 3,035-metre (9,957-foot) mountain summit located in Kananaskis Country in the Canadian Rockies of Alberta, Canada. Mount James Walker is situated within Spray Valley Provincial Park, and its nearest higher peak is Mount Galatea, 5.0 km (3.1 mi) to the northwest.

== History ==
The mountain was named in 1959 after Colonel James Walker (1846-1936), who was a Mountie, soldier, businessman, and postmaster of the Kananaskis Post Office. He was named Calgary's "Citizen of the Century" during the city's centennial year in 1975.

The mountain's name became official in 1977 by the Geographical Names Board of Canada.

== Geology ==
Mount James Walker is composed of sedimentary rock laid down during the Precambrian to Jurassic periods. Formed in shallow seas, this sedimentary rock was pushed east and over the top of younger rock during the Laramide orogeny. The Lewis Overthrust extends over 450 km from Mount James Walker south to Steamboat Mountain, located west of Great Falls, Montana. Nearby Mount Kidd marks the northern end of the Lewis Thrust Fault.

== Climate ==
Based on the Köppen climate classification, Mount James Walker is located in a subarctic climate with cold, snowy winters, and mild summers. Temperatures can drop below −20 °C with wind chill factors below −30 °C. Precipitation runoff from the mountain drains into the Kananaskis River which is a tributary of the Bow River, and thence the Saskatchewan River.

== See also ==
- Geography of Alberta
