= Mount Lorette (Alberta) =

Mountain in Alberta, Canada

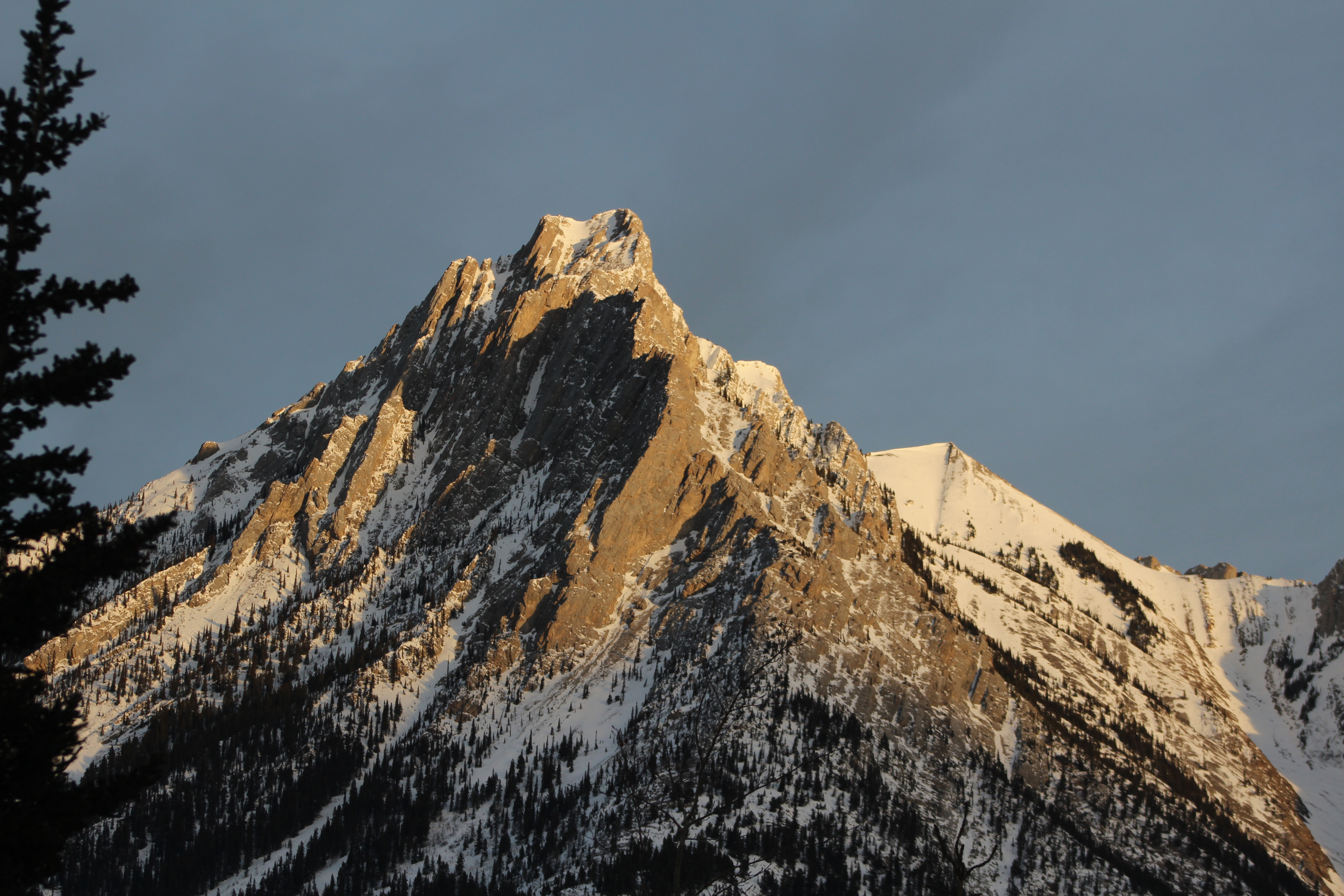
- Mount Lorette in November

Highest point
- Elevation: 2,487 m (8,159 ft)
- Prominence: 49 m (161 ft)
- Parent peak: Skogan Peak (2662 m)
- Listing: Mountains of Alberta
- Coordinates: 50°59′11″N 115°08′01″W

Geography
- Location within Alberta Location within Canada
- Interactive map of Mount Lorette
- Location: Alberta, Canada
- Parent range: Kananaskis Range; Canadian Rockies
- Topo map: NTS 82J14 Spray Lakes Reservoir

Geology
- Rock age: Cambrian
- Rock type: limestone

Climbing
- First ascent: 1952
- Easiest route: Scramble

Mount Lorette is a 2,487-metre (8,159-foot) summit centrally located in Kananaskis Country in the Canadian Rockies of Alberta, Canada. Mount Lorette's nearest higher peak is Skogan Peak, 2.0 km (1.2 mi) to the north-northwest. Mount Lorette is a landmark that can be seen from Highway 40 north of the Kananaskis Village area.

== History ==
It was named in 1922 for Lorette Spur, a ridge to the north of Vimy Ridge which was the scene of very heavy fighting during World War I. Capturing Lorette Spur marked a significant battle in French military history.

The first ascent of the peak was made in 1952 by R.C. Hind, B. Richardson, L. Keeling, J. Manry, J. Dodds, and C. McAllister.

The mountain's name was officially adopted in 1953 by the Geographical Names Board of Canada.

== Geology ==
Mount Lorette is composed of sedimentary rock laid down during the Precambrian to Jurassic periods. Formed in shallow seas, this sedimentary rock was pushed east and over the top of younger rock during the Laramide orogeny.

== Climate ==
Based on the Köppen climate classification, Mount Lorette is located in a subarctic climate with cold, snowy winters, and mild summers. Temperatures can drop below −20 °C with wind chill factors below −30 °C. Precipitation runoff from the mountain drains into the Kananaskis River which is a tributary of the Bow River.

== Gallery ==
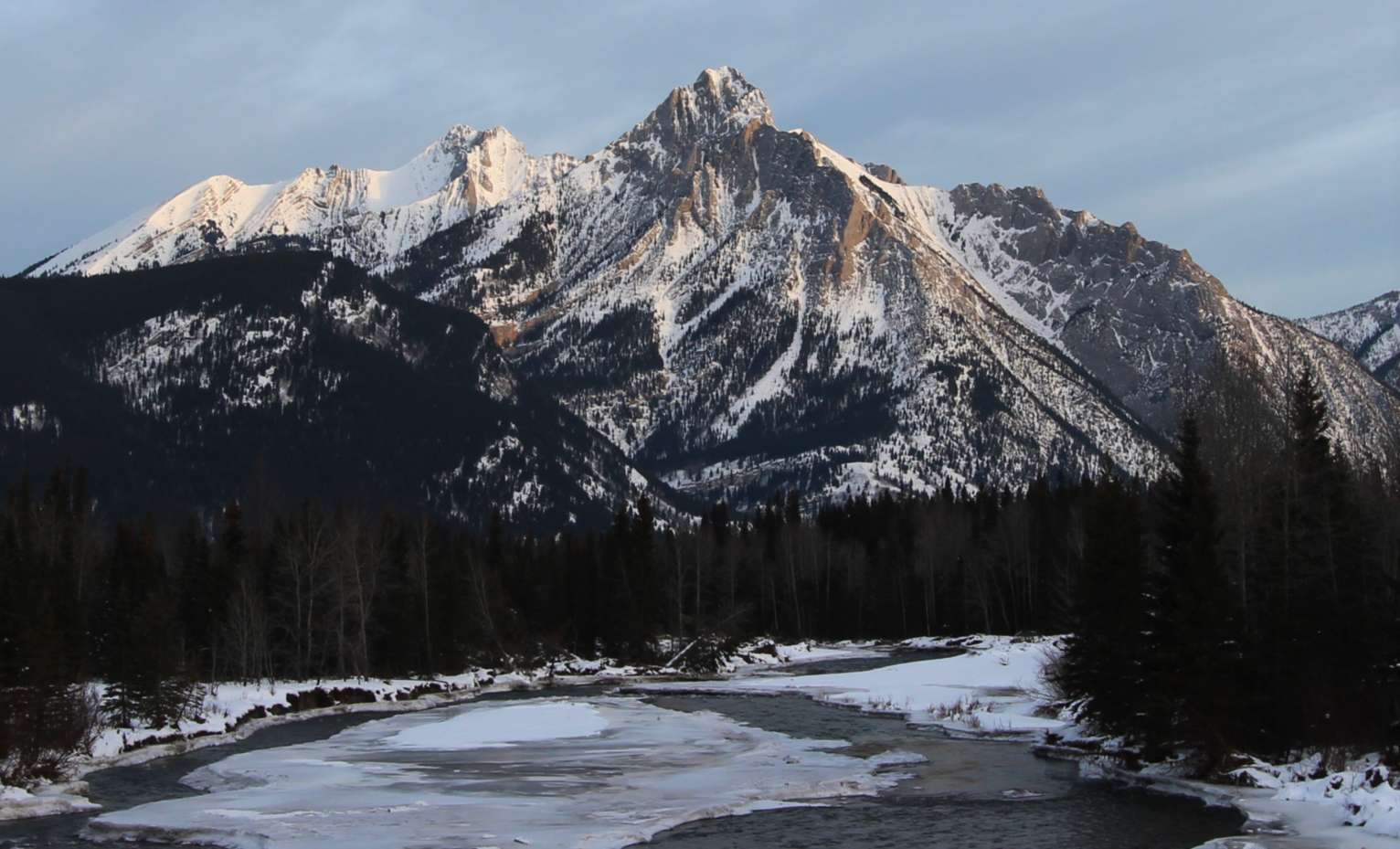
Mount Lorette seen from Kananaskis valley with Skogan Peak behind to left

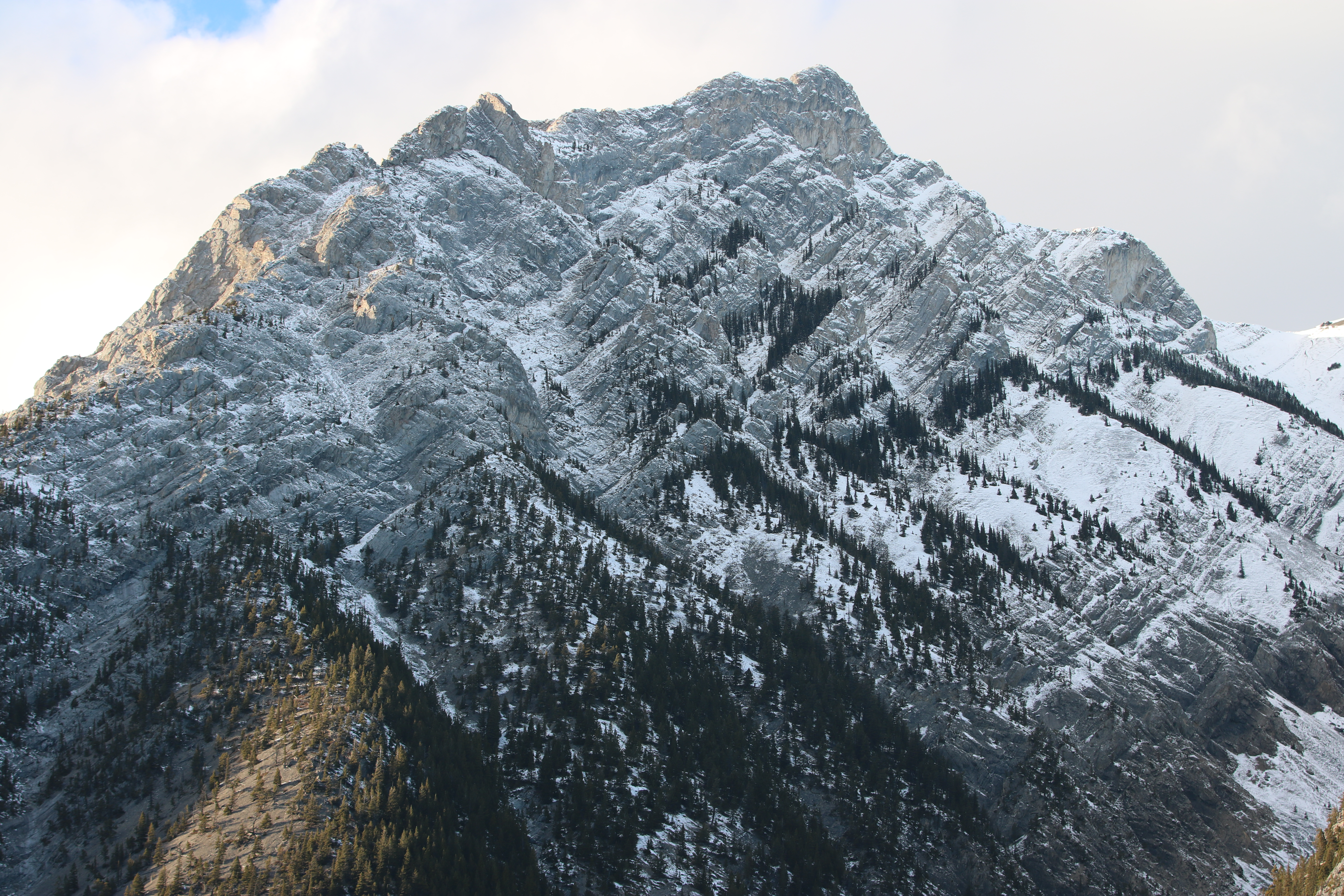
Close-up

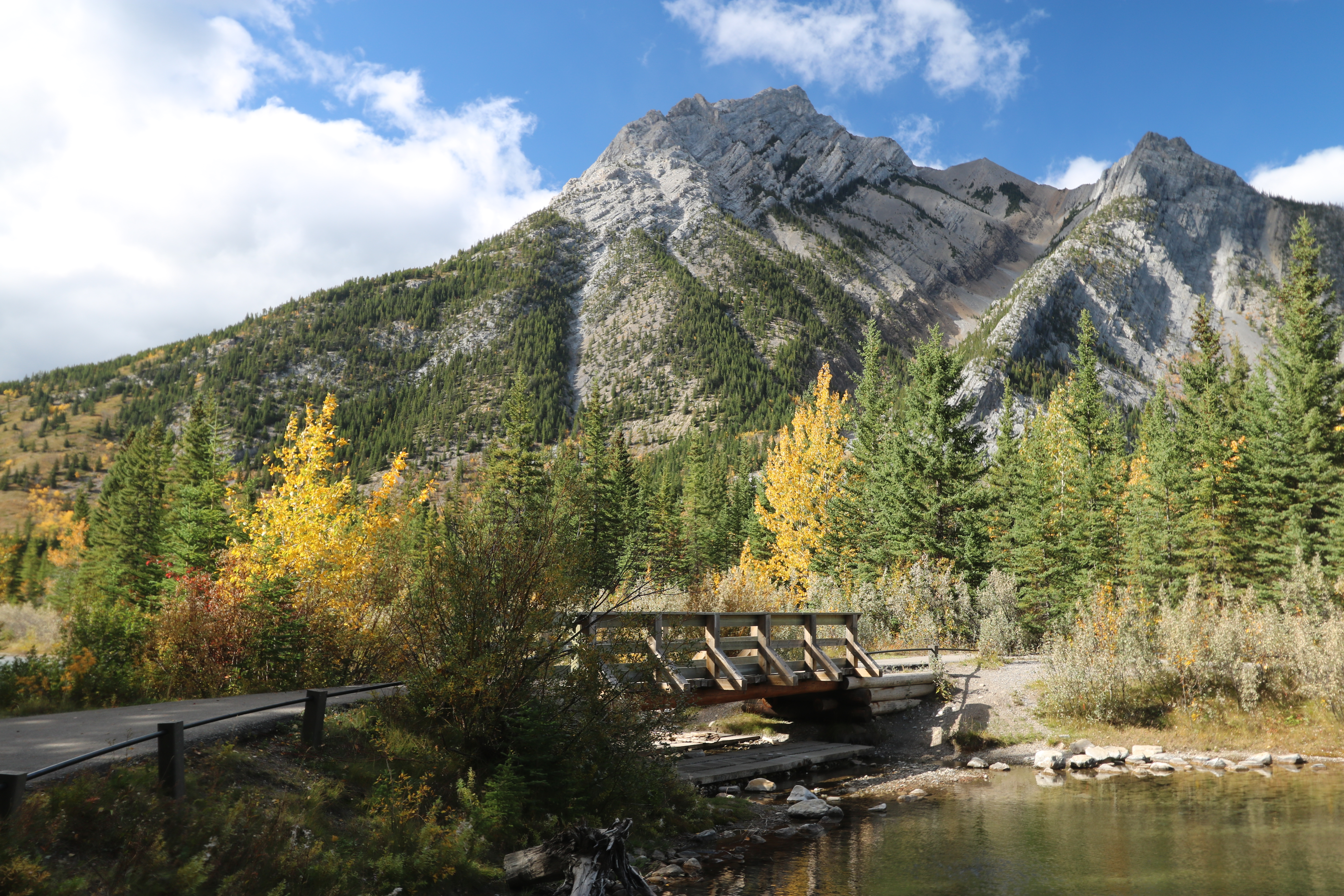
From Lorette Ponds

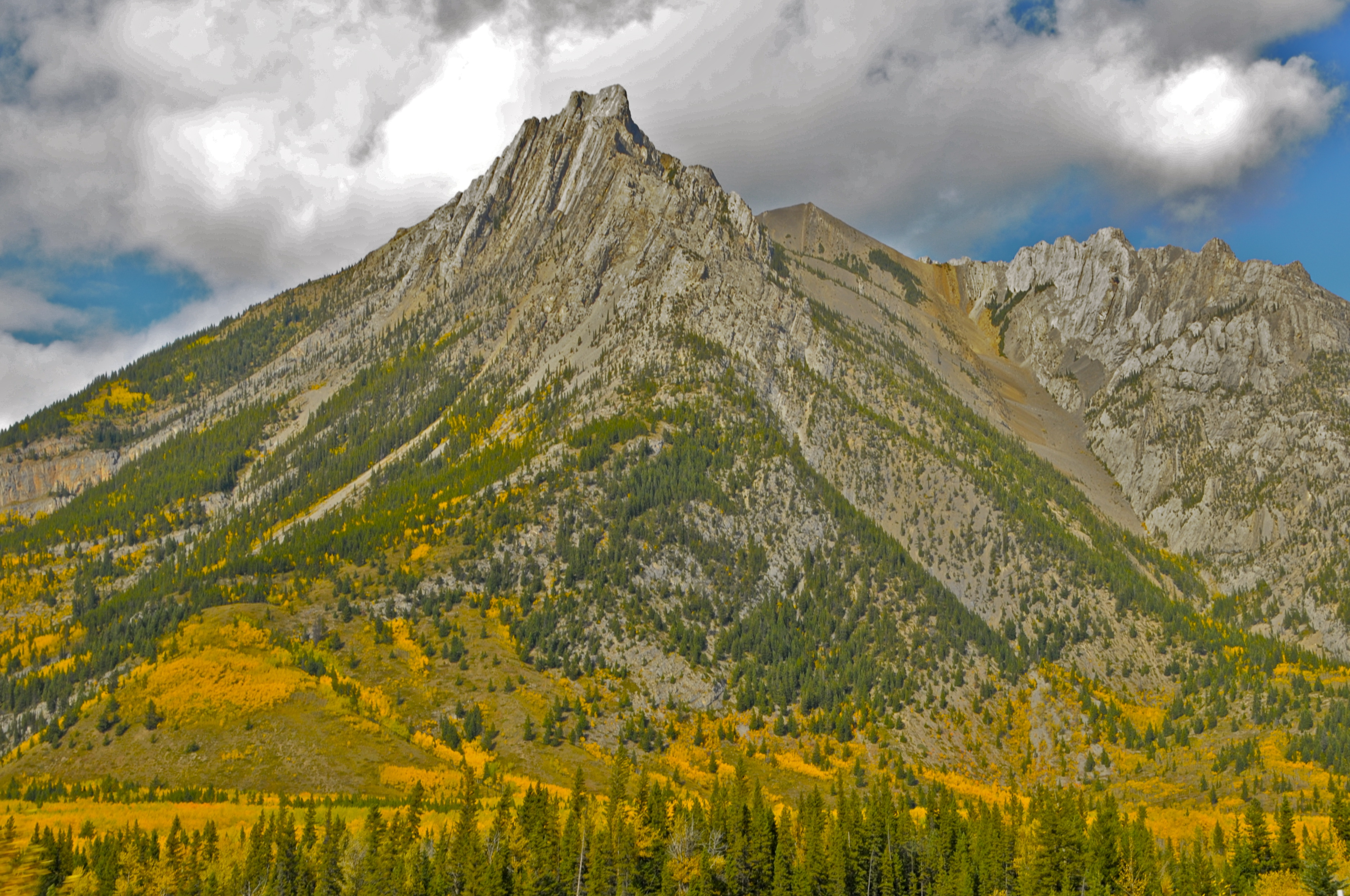
Mount Lorette in autumn

== See also ==
- Geology of Alberta
