= Pigeon Mountain (Alberta) =

Mountain in Alberta, Canada

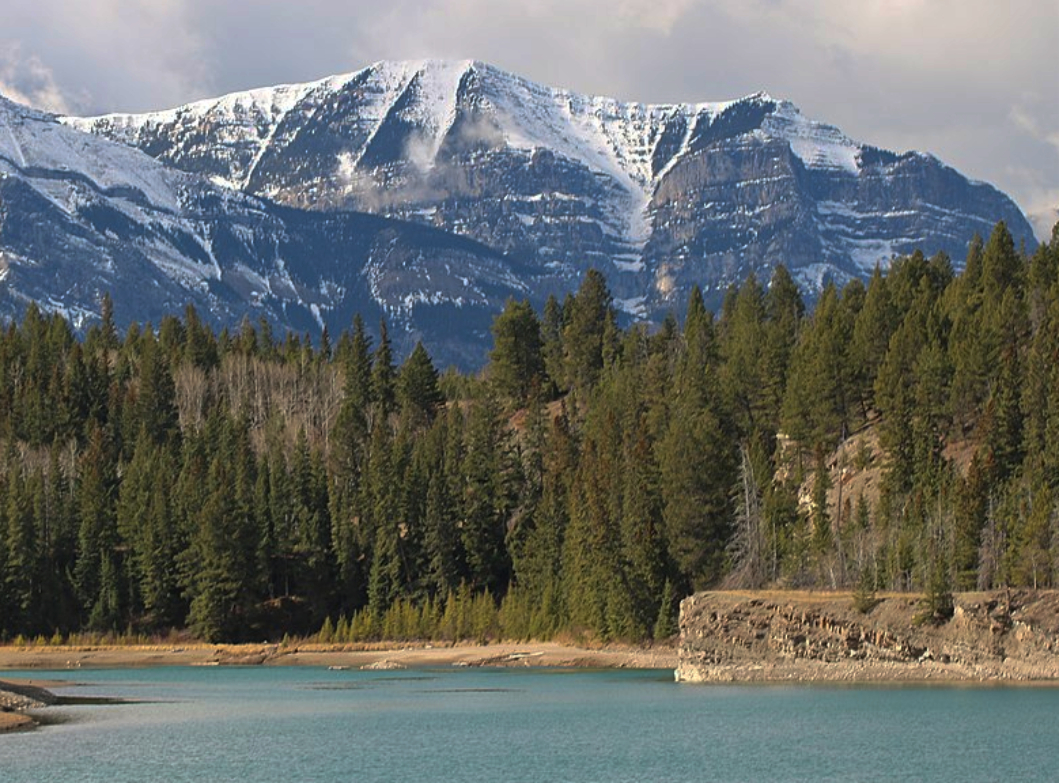
- Pigeon Mountain seen from Bow River

Highest point
- Elevation: 2,394 m (7,854 ft)
- Prominence: 393 m (1,289 ft)
- Parent peak: Skogan Peak (2662 m)
- Listing: Mountains of Alberta
- Coordinates: 51°01′42″N 115°12′24″W

Geography
- Location within Alberta Location within Canada
- Interactive map of Pigeon Mountain
- Location: Alberta, Canada
- Parent range: Kananaskis Range; Canadian Rockies
- Topo map: NTS 82O3 Canmore

Geology
- Rock age: Cambrian

Climbing
- Easiest route: Hiking

Pigeon Mountain is a 2,394-metre (7,854-foot) mountain summit located in the Bow River Valley of Kananaskis Country in the Canadian Rockies of Alberta, Canada. Its parent peak is Skogan Peak, 5.0 km (3.1 mi) to the southeast. Pigeon Mountain can be seen from Highway 1, the Trans-Canada Highway in the Canmore to Exshaw area.

== History ==
This mountain was named Pic de Pigeons in 1858 by Eugene Bourgeau, the French-born botanist while on the Palliser expedition, for flocks of pigeons seen near the mountain. Since pigeons are a species that has been introduced and would not have been present in the Bow Valley in 1858, it is unclear what species of bird Bourgeau observed. The mountain's name was officially adopted in 1956 by the Geographical Names Board of Canada.

== Geology ==
Pigeon Mountain is composed of sedimentary rock laid down during the Precambrian to Jurassic periods. Formed in shallow seas, this sedimentary rock was pushed east and over the top of younger rock during the Laramide orogeny.

== Climate ==
Based on the Köppen climate classification, Pigeon Mountain is located in a subarctic climate zone with cold, snowy winters, and mild summers. Winter temperatures can drop below −20 °C with wind chill factors below −30 °C. Precipitation runoff from Pigeon Mountain drains into the Bow River which is a tributary of the Saskatchewan River.

== Climbing ==
Pigeon Mountain is a hike mostly through meadows from its west side. An unofficial 2.8 kilometre trail gains 535 metres from the Skogan Pass Trail. An exceptional view awaits from the summit.

== Gallery ==
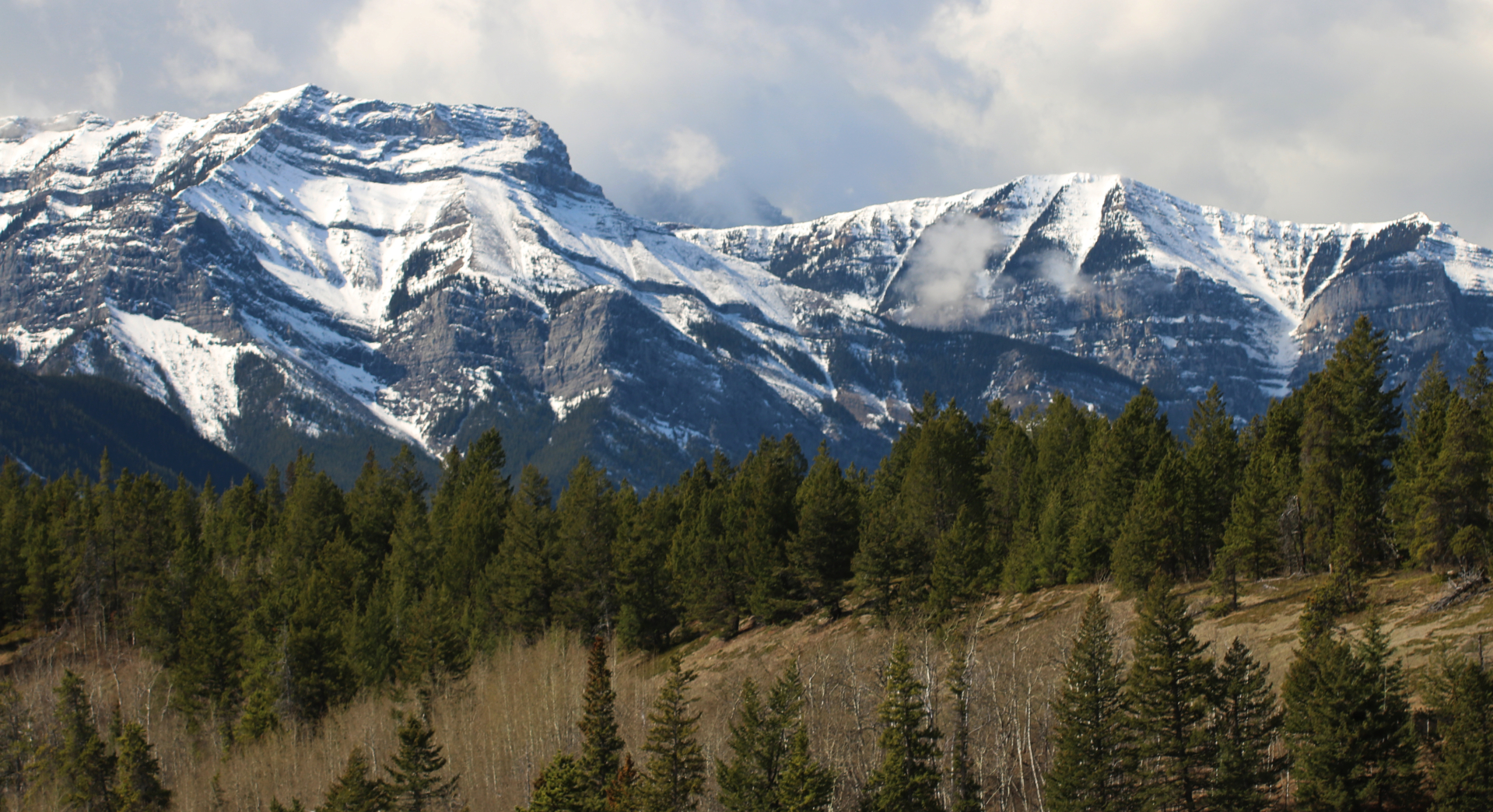
Mount McGillivray (left) and Pigeon Mountain (right)

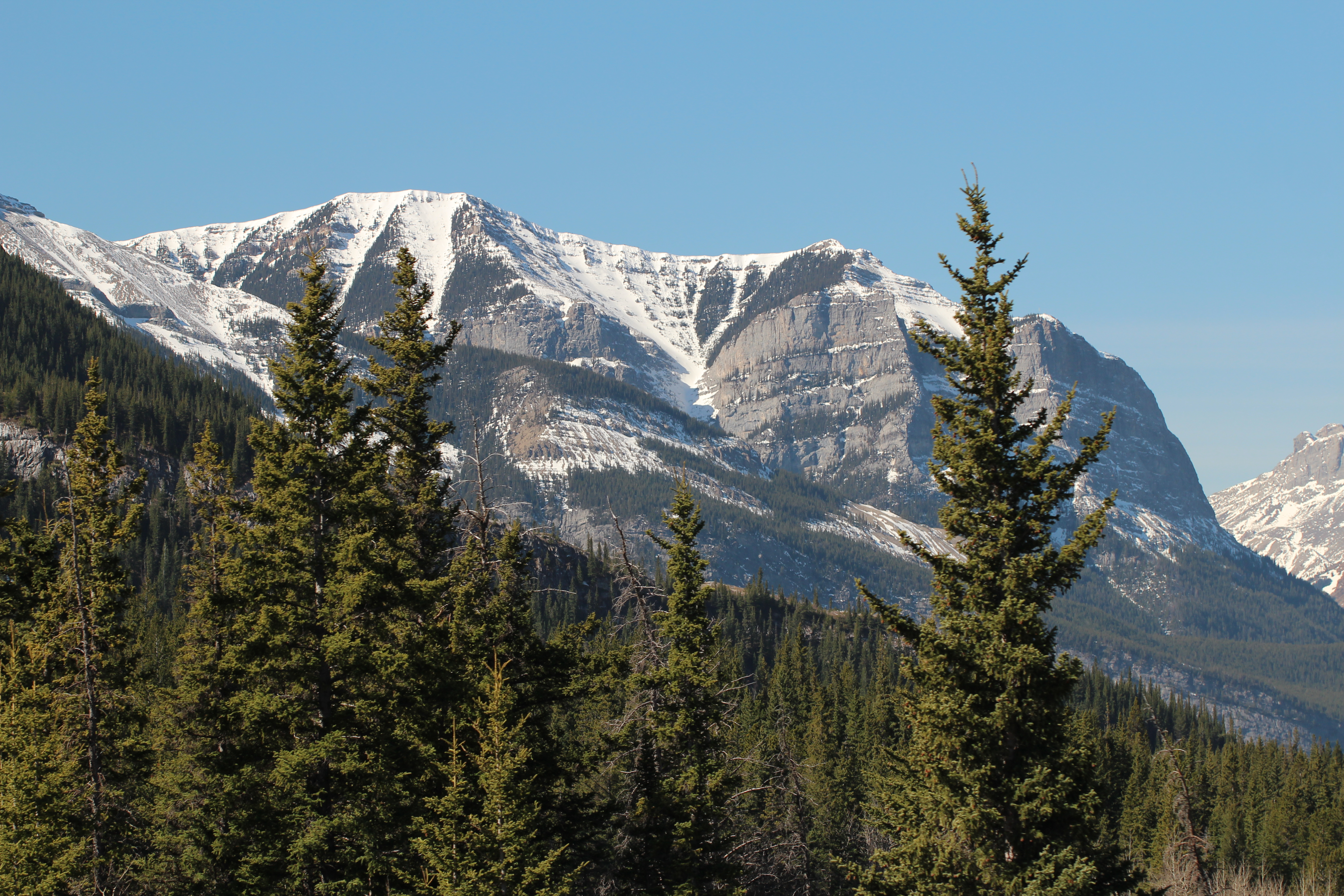
Pigeon Mountain

== See also ==
- List of mountains of Canada
- Geography of Alberta
