= Mount Engadine =

Mountain in the Spray River Valley, Alberta, Canada

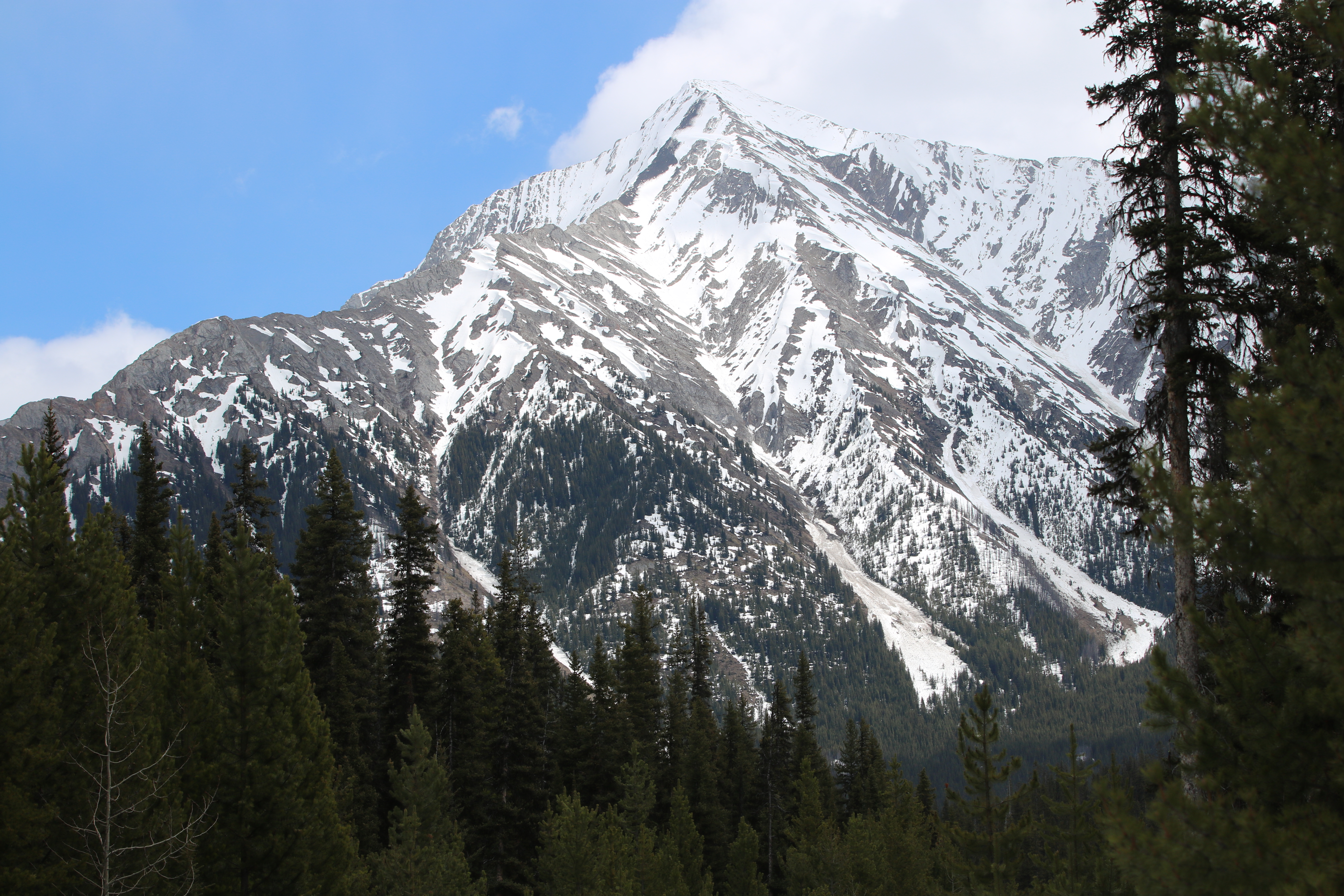
- Mount Engadine

Highest point
- Elevation: 2,972 m (9,751 ft)
- Prominence: 320 m (1,050 ft)
- Listing: Mountains of Alberta
- Coordinates: 50°51′53″N 115°18′39″W

Geography
- Location within Alberta
- Interactive map of Mount Engadine
- Location: Alberta, Canada
- Parent range: Kananaskis Range
- Topo map: NTS 82J14 Spray Lakes Reservoir

Climbing
- First ascent: 1956 B. Fraser, J. Gorrill, M. Hicks
- Easiest route: A difficult scramble via west-northwest ridge.

Mount Engadine is a 2,972-metre (9,751-foot) mountain summit located in the Spray River Valley of Kananaskis Country, in the Canadian Rockies of Alberta, Canada. It was named in 1917 after HMS Engadine, a seaplane tender of the Royal Navy present at the Battle of Jutland during World War I. The mountain is located in the Kananaskis Range in Alberta.

== Geology ==
The mountain is composed of sedimentary rock laid down during the Precambrian to Jurassic periods and was later pushed east and over the top of younger rock during the Laramide orogeny.

== Climate ==
Based on the Köppen climate classification, Mount Engadine is located in a subarctic climate with cold, snowy winters, and mild summers. Temperatures can drop below −20 °C with wind chill factors below −30 °C. In terms of favorable weather, June through September are the best months to climb. Precipitation runoff from the mountain drains into Smuts Creek and Buller Creek, which empty into Spray Lakes Reservoir.

== Gallery ==
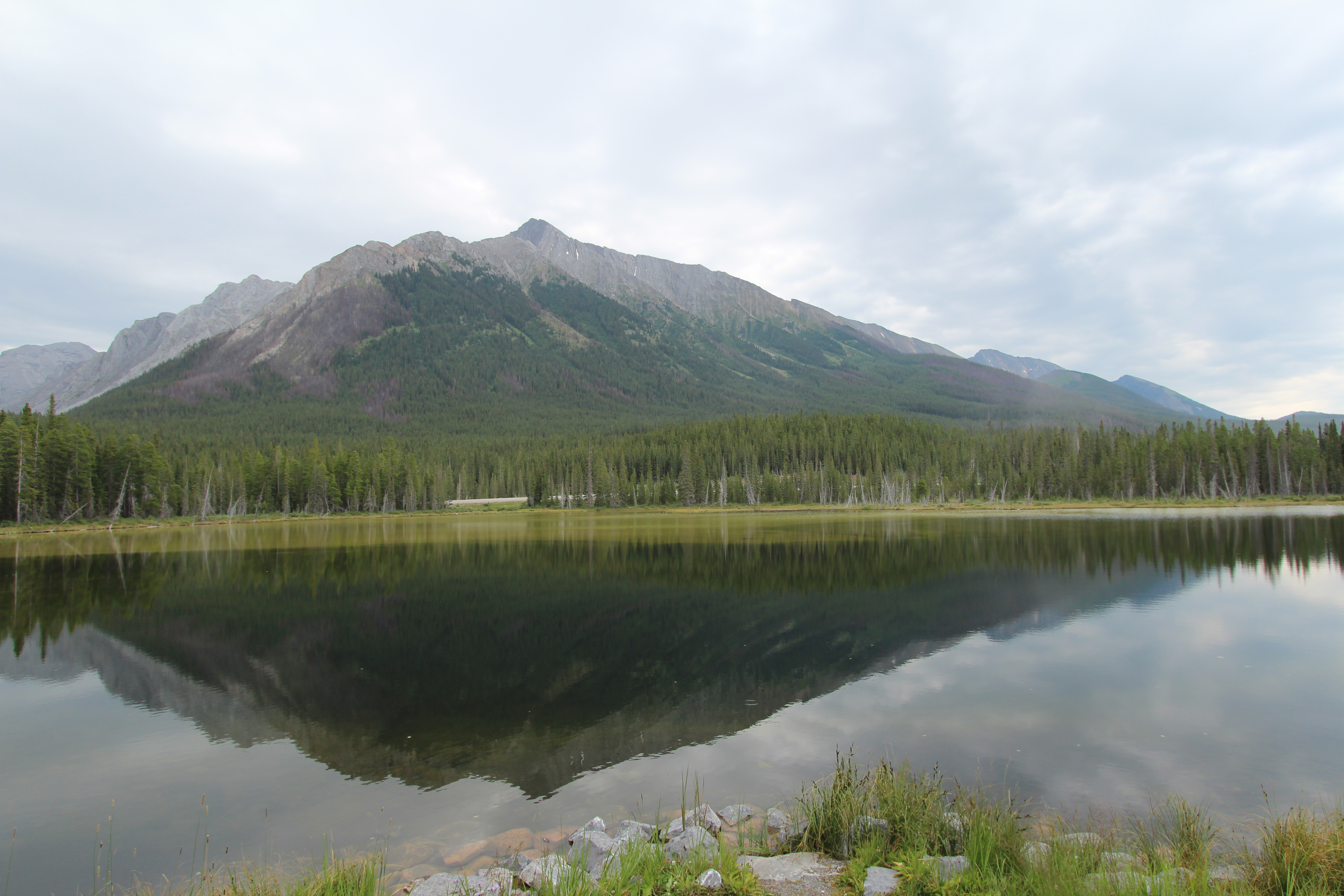
Mount Engadine reflected in Buller Pond

== See also ==
- Geology of the Rocky Mountains
- Geography of Alberta
