= Mount Buller (Alberta) =

Mountain in Alberta, Canada

- Buller Mountain
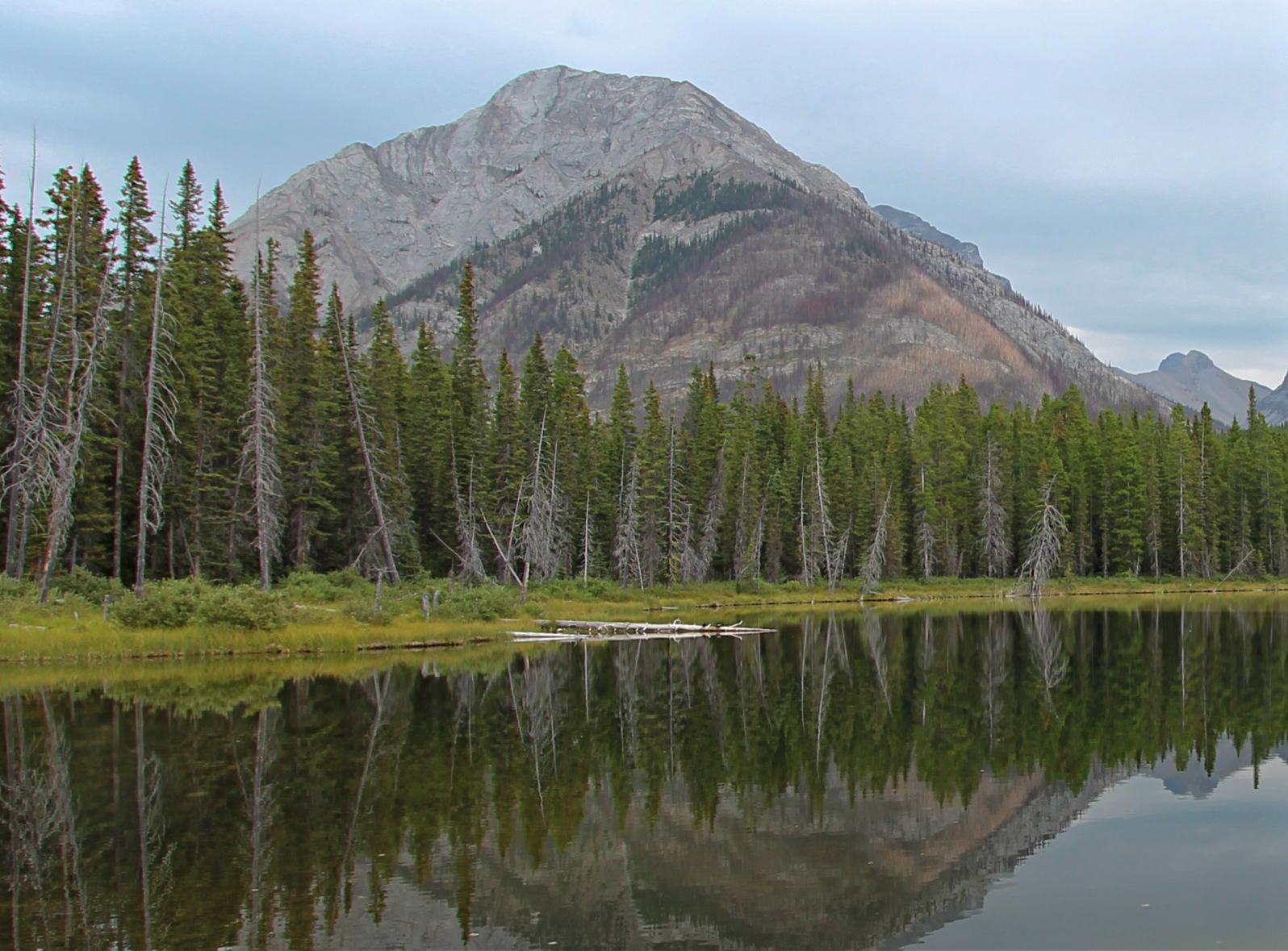
- Mt. Buller seen from Buller Pond

Highest point
- Elevation: 2,805 m (9,203 ft)
- Parent peak: Mount Bogart (3144 m)
- Listing: Mountains of Alberta
- Coordinates: 50°53′33″N 115°18′52″W

Geography
- Location within Alberta
- Location: Alberta, Canada
- Parent range: Kananaskis Range
- Topo map: NTS 82J14 Spray Lakes Reservoir

Climbing
- First ascent: 1956 by B. Fraser, M. Hicks, J. Gorril
- Easiest route: Moderate scramble if upper slabs are snow free

Mount Buller was named in 1922 after Lieutenant Colonel H.C. Buller DSO, a casualty of World War I. It is located in the Kananaskis Range in Alberta.

== Geology ==
Buller is composed of sedimentary rock laid down during the Precambrian to Jurassic periods. Formed in shallow seas, this sedimentary rock was pushed east and over the top of younger rock during the Laramide orogeny.

== Climate ==
Based on the Köppen climate classification, Buller is located in a subarctic climate with cold, snowy winters, and mild summers. Temperatures can drop below −20 °C (−4 °F) with wind chill factors below −30 °C (−22 °F). Precipitation runoff from the mountain drains west into Spray Lakes Reservoir.

== Gallery ==
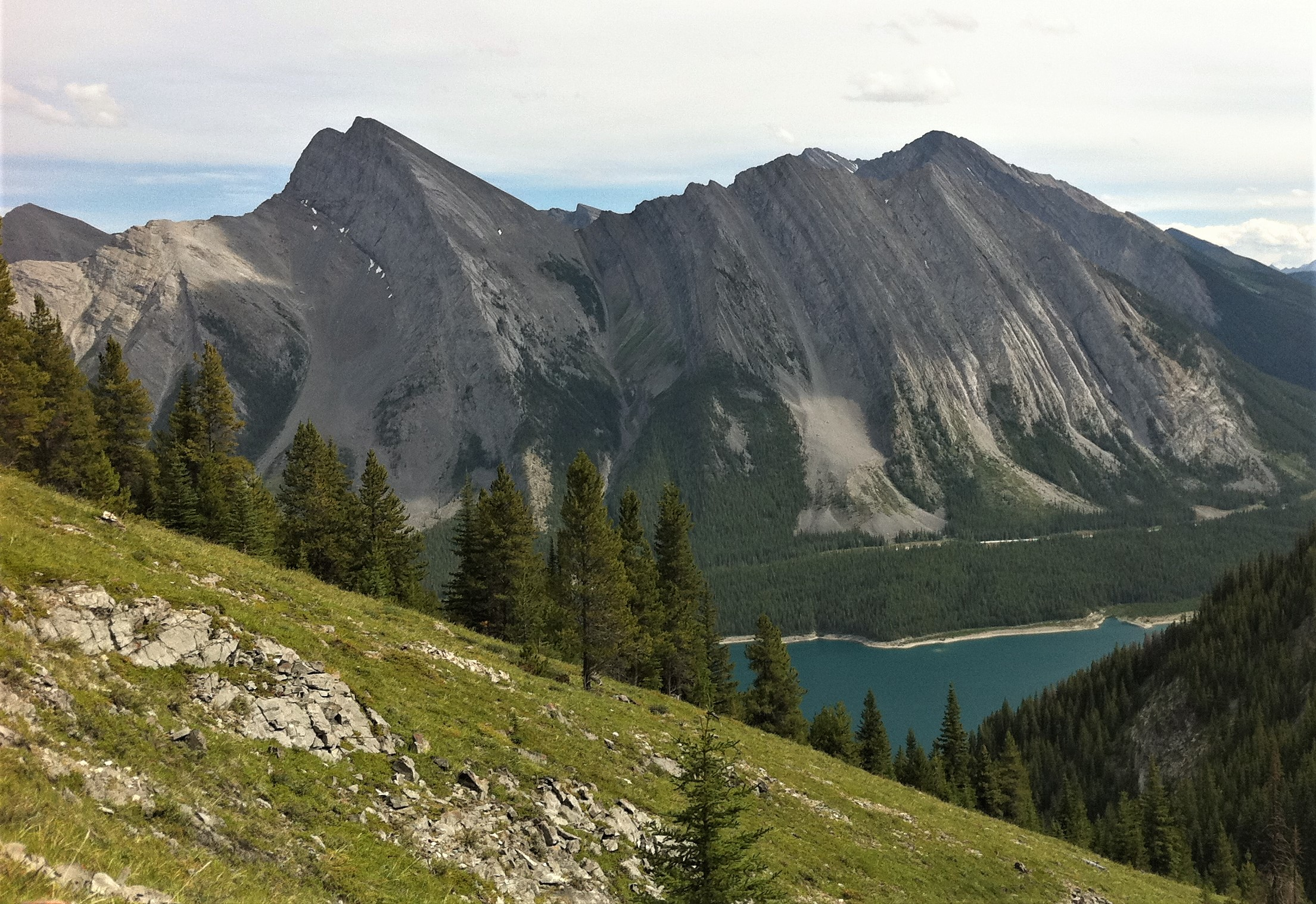
Mount Buller (left) seen from Mount Nestor

== See also ==
- Geography of Alberta
- Media related to Mount Buller (Alberta) at Wikimedia Commons
