= Kananaskis Range =

Subrange of the Front Ranges in Alberta, Canada

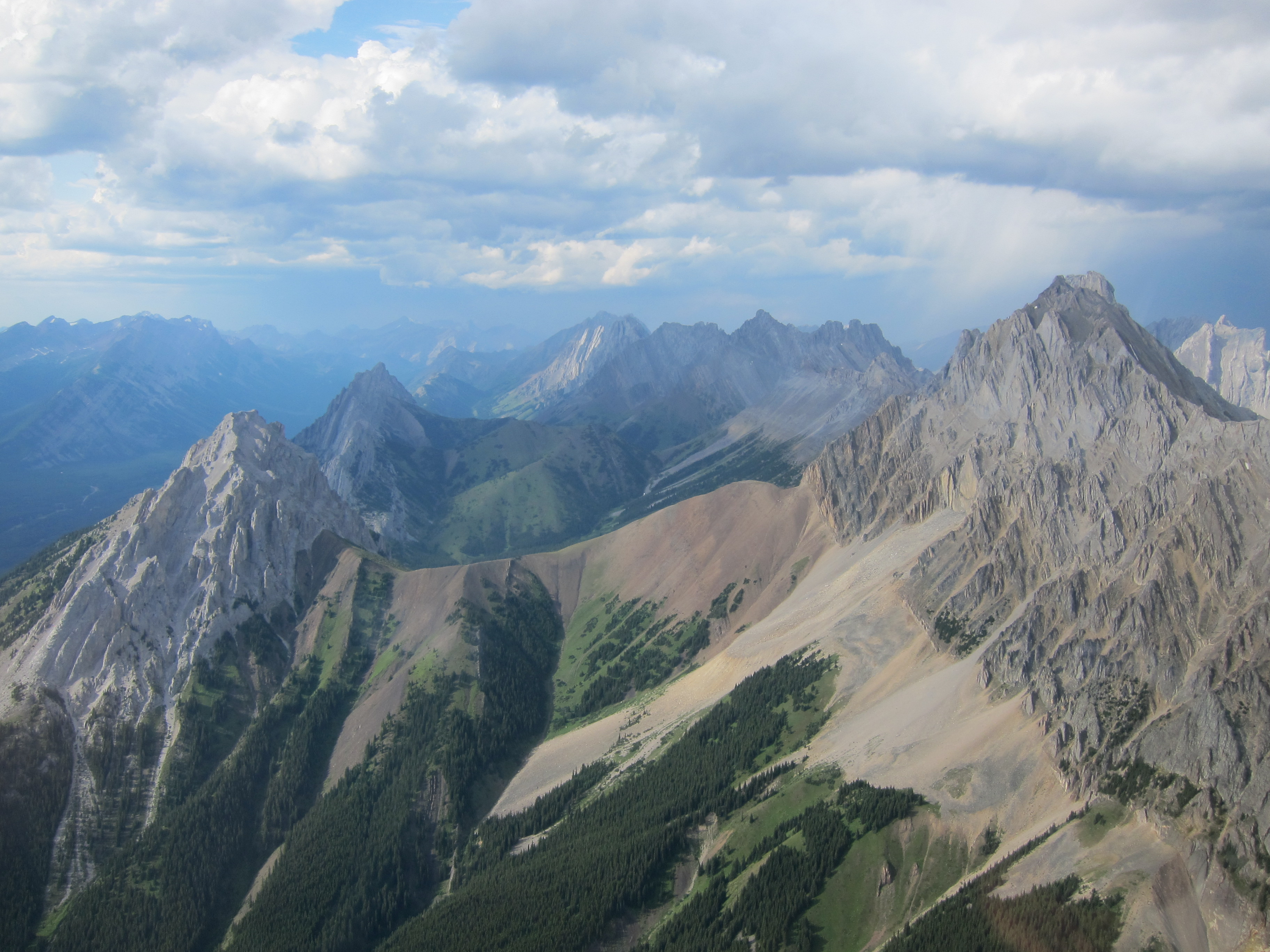
- High Rock Range in Kannaskis

Highest point
- Peak: Mount Galatea
- Elevation: 3,185 m (10,449 ft)
- Coordinates: 50°50′23″N 115°16′26″W

Dimensions
- Length: 44 km (27 mi)
- Width: 25 km (16 mi)

Geography
- Location within Alberta
- Country: Canada
- Province: Alberta
- Range coordinates: 50°51′14″N 115°15′53″W
- Parent range: Continental Ranges
- Topo map: NTS 82J14

The Kananaskis Range is a mountain range west of the Kananaskis River in the Continental Ranges of the Canadian Rockies. Many of the peaks are named after ships and people involved in the Battle of Jutland.

Mount Bogart is named after D.B. Dowling. Bogart was his mother's maiden name and his middle name. D.B. Dowling surveyed the area in the early 1900s for the Geographical Society of Canada. Tower was named after Francis George Towers an early homesteader of the region. Mt McDougal another early homesteader Archie McDougal of Carstairs. Mts. Evans Thomas named after Thomas Oldham Evans an early homesteader.

== List of mountains ==
Peaks of this range include:

Name	Elevation		Prominence		Coordinates
Name	m	ft	m	ft	Coordinates
Mount Galatea	3,185	10,449	1,280	4,200	50°50′23″N 115°16′26″W
Wind Mountain	3,153	10,344	745	2,444	50°57′15″N 115°14′46″W
Mount Bogart	3,144	10,315	492	1,614	50°54′42″N 115°14′35″W
The Tower	3,124	10,249	618	2,028	50°51′24.1″N 115°17′24.0″W
Mount Sparrowhawk	3,121	10,240	256	840	50°56′26″N 115°15′57″W
Mount Lougheed	3,107	10,194	242	794	50°57′56″N 115°15′45″W
Mount Chester	3,054	10,020	341	1,119	50°48′24″N 115°15′47″W
Mount James Walker	3,035	9,957	322	1,056	50°48′18″N 115°13′12″W
The Fortress	3,000	9,800	287	942	50°49′40″N 115°14′36″W
Gusty Peak	3,000	9,800	226	741	50°49′50″N 115°15′31″W
Mount Inflexible	3,000	9,800	379	1,243	50°46′54″N 115°12′25″W
Mount Engadine	2,970	9,740	320	1,050	50°51′54″N 115°18′40″W
Mount Kidd	2,958	9,705	535	1,755	50°53′37″N 115°11′23″W
Mount Buller	2,805	9,203	270	890	50°57′15″N 115°14′46″W
Mount Lawson	2,795	9,170	113	371	50°53′25″N 115°18′50″W
Mount Kent	2,637	8,652	46	151	
Mount Lorette	2,487	8,159	49	161	50°59′11″N 115°8′1″W
Pigeon Mountain	2,394	7,854	393	1,289	51°1′42″N 115°12′24″W
Mary Barclay's Mountain	2,260	7,410	160	520	50°59′58″N 115°6′15″W
