= Skogan Peak =

Mountain peak in Alberta, Canada

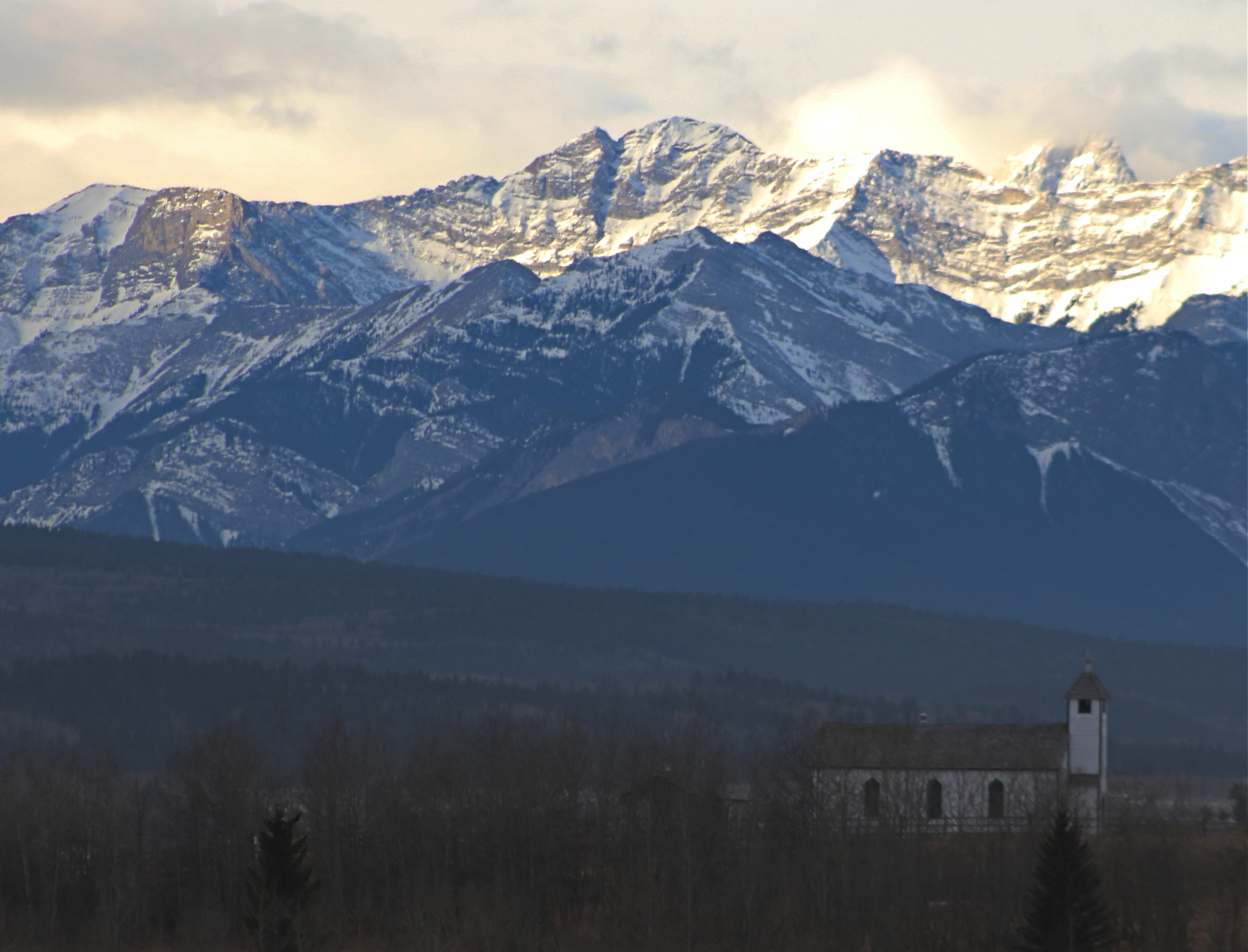
- Skogan Peak seen from Morley

Highest point
- Elevation: 2,662 m (8,734 ft)
- Prominence: 635 m (2,083 ft)
- Parent peak: Wind Mountain (3153 m)
- Listing: Mountains of Alberta
- Coordinates: 51°00′06″N 115°08′42″W

Geography
- Location within Alberta Location within Canada
- Interactive map of Skogan Peak
- Location: Alberta, Canada
- Parent range: Kananaskis Range; Canadian Rockies
- Topo map: NTS 82J14 Spray Lakes Reservoir

Geology
- Rock age: Cambrian
- Rock type: limestone

Climbing
- Easiest route: Scramble

Skogan Peak is a 2,662-metre (8,734-foot) mountain summit located in Kananaskis Country in the Canadian Rockies of Alberta, Canada. Skogan Peak's nearest higher peak is Wind Mountain, 8.8 km (5.5 mi) to the southwest. Skogan Peak can be seen from Highway 40 north of the Kananaskis Village area, and from the Barrier Lake area.

== Geology ==
Skogan Peak is composed of sedimentary rock laid down during the Precambrian to Jurassic periods. Formed in shallow seas, this sedimentary rock was pushed east and over the top of younger rock during the Laramide orogeny.

== Climate ==
Based on the Köppen climate classification, Skogan Peak is located in a subarctic climate zone with cold, snowy winters, and mild summers. Winter temperatures can drop below −20 °C with wind chill factors below −30 °C. Precipitation runoff from the mountain drains into tributaries of the Bow River.

== Gallery ==
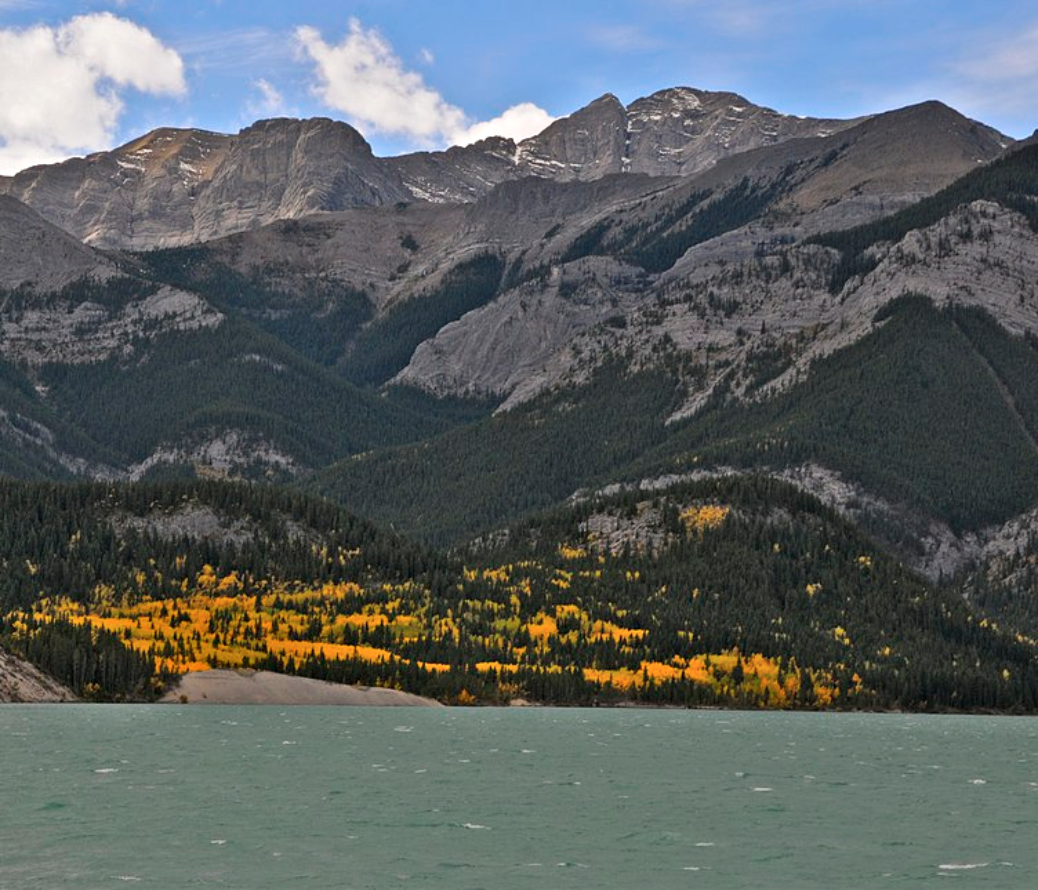
Skogan Peak from Barrier Lake

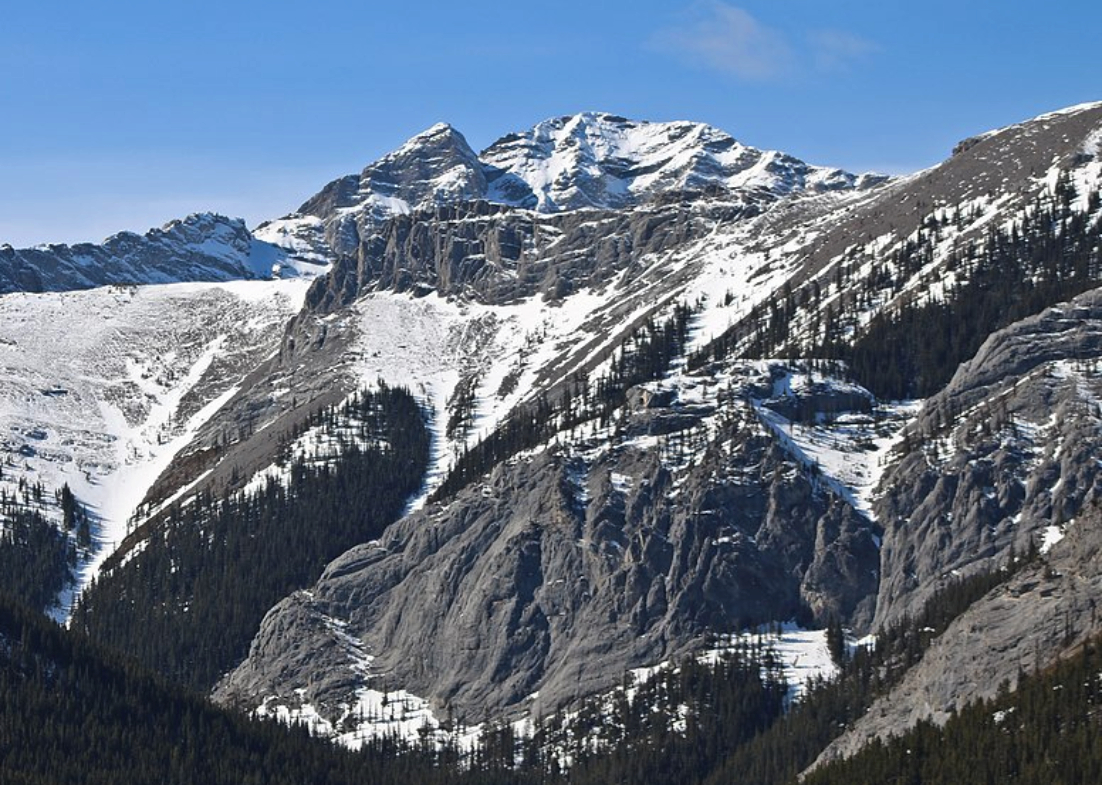
Skogan Peak summit

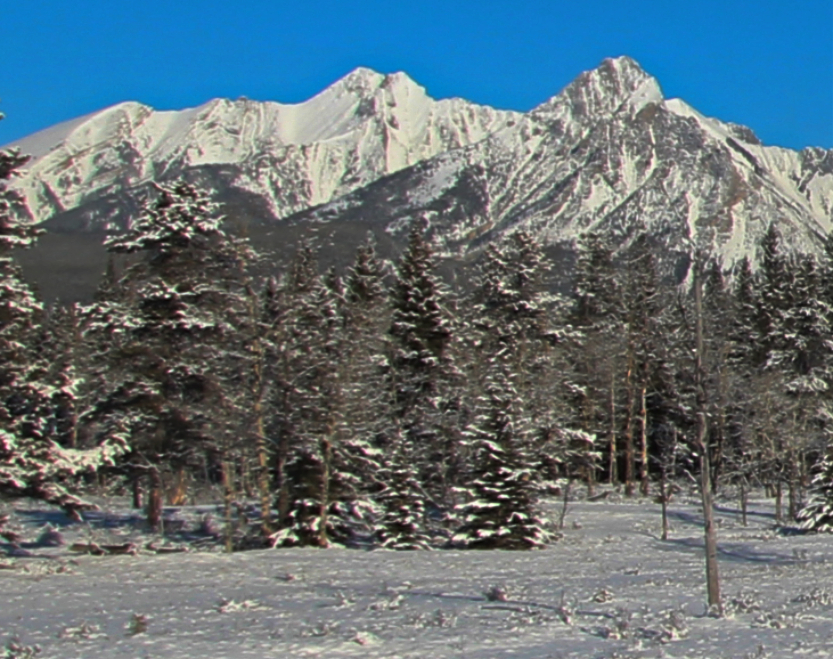
Skogan Peak centered with Lorette to right

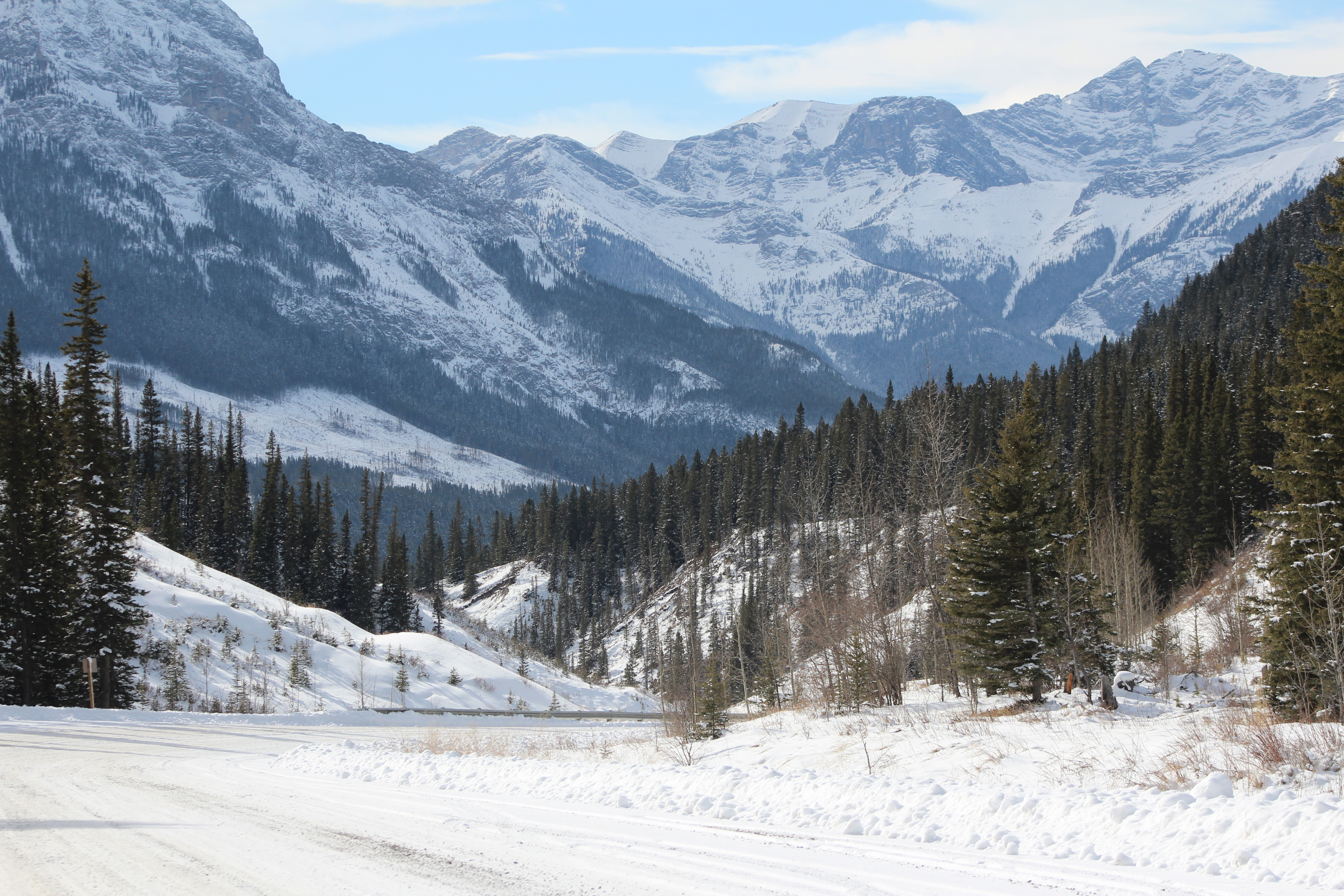
Skogan in upper right corner

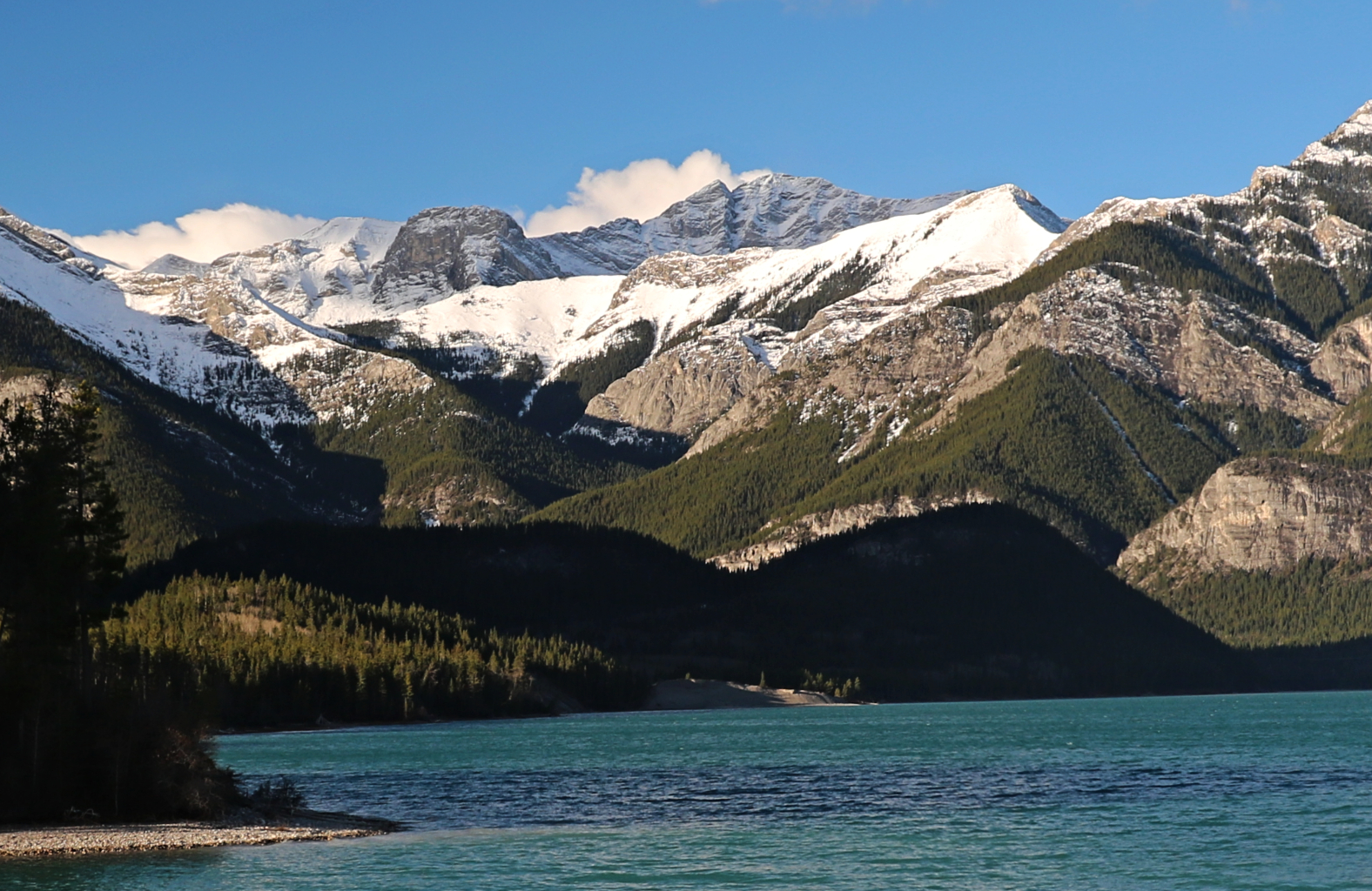
Skogan Peak seen from Barrier Lake

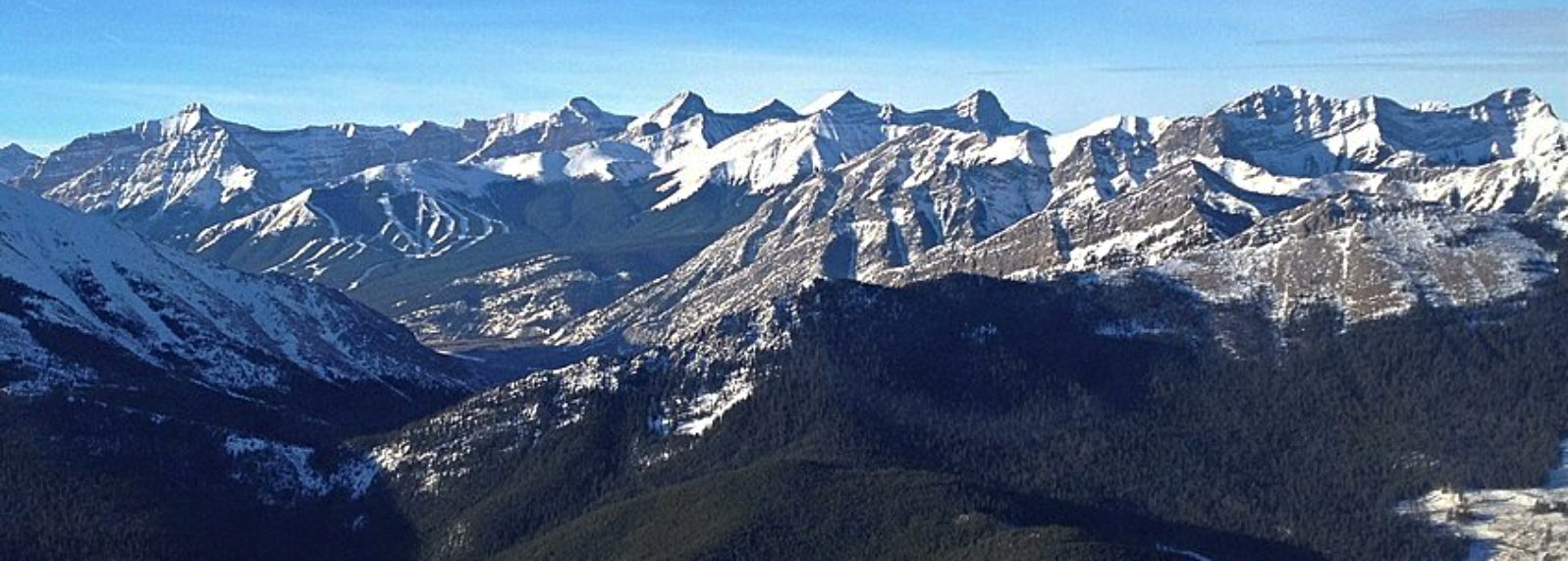
Bogart (L), Lougheed (C), Skogan (R)

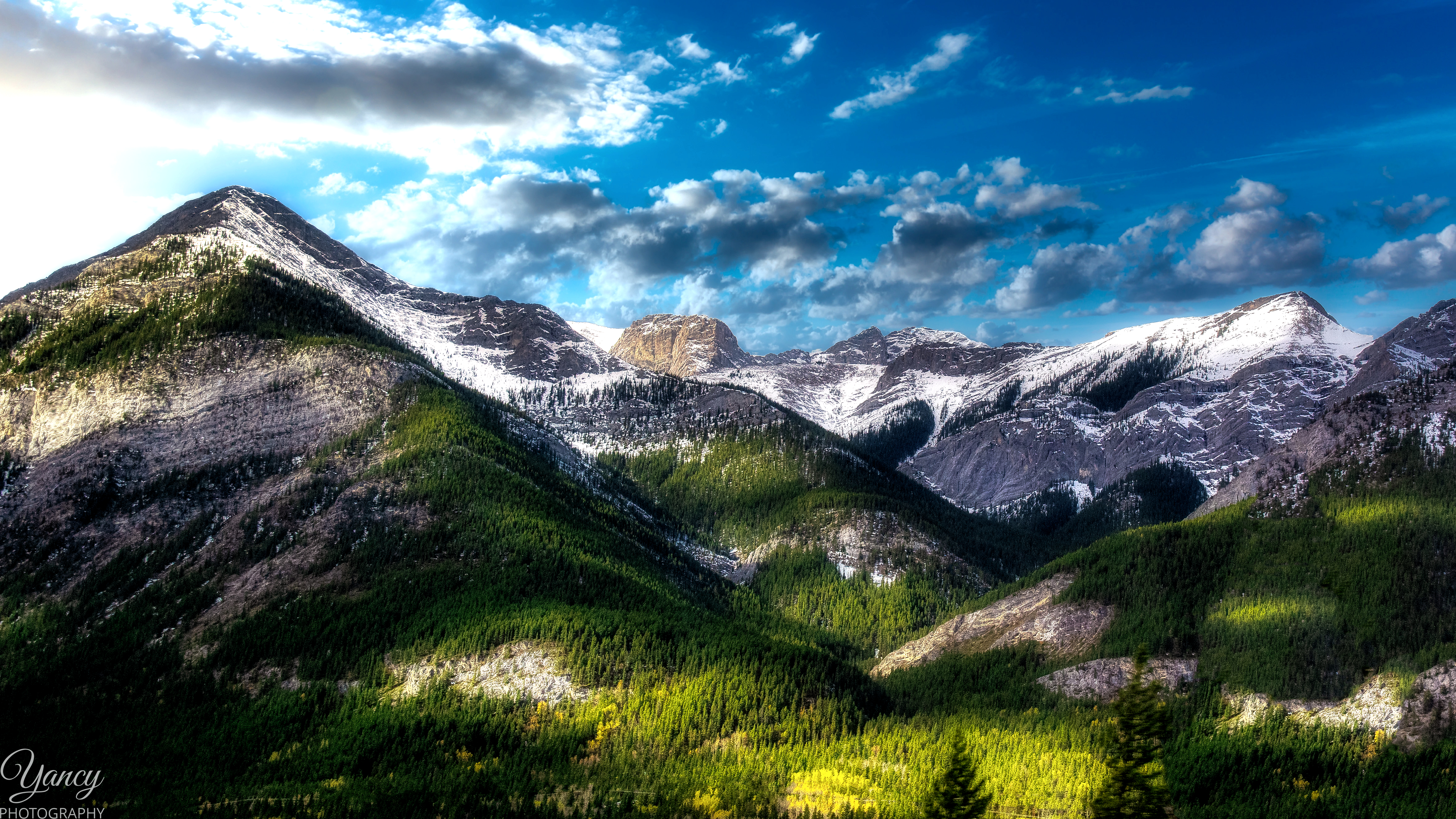
Skogan Peak

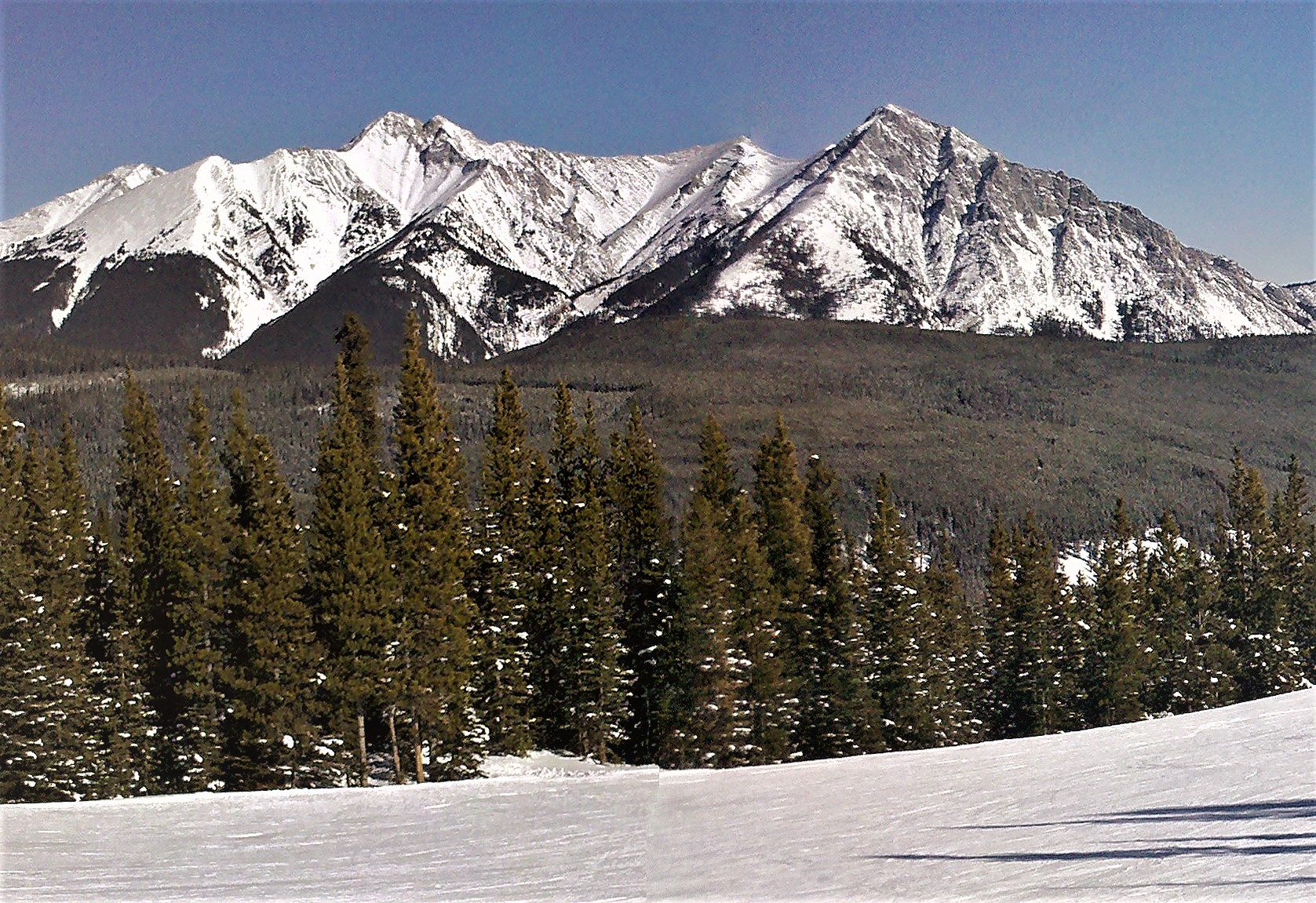
Skogan Peak (left) and Mount Lorette (right) viewed from Nakiska ski area

== See also ==
- Geography of Alberta
- Geology of Alberta
- List of mountains in the Canadian Rockies
