= Mount Galatea =

Mountain in Alberta, Canada

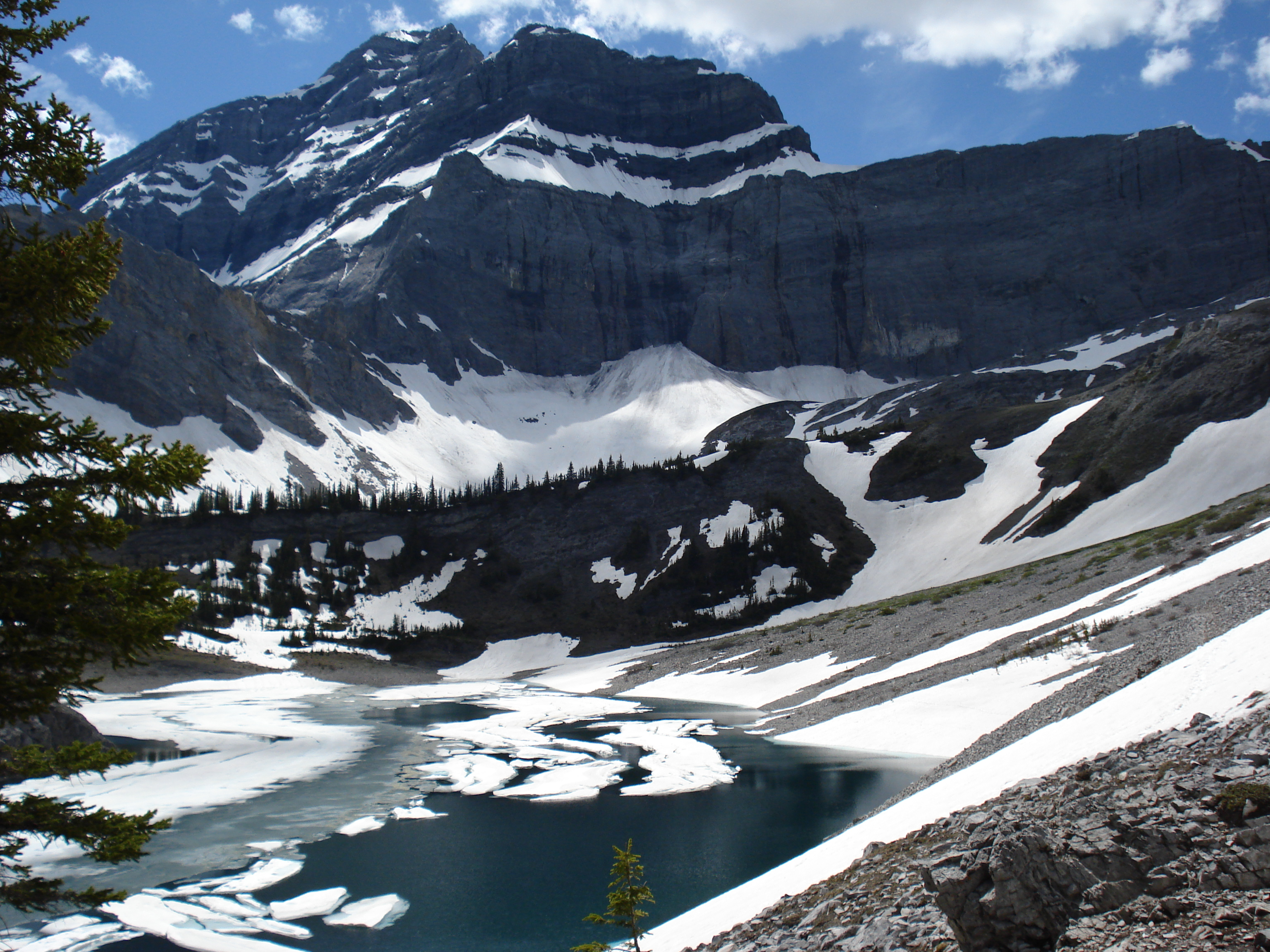
- Mount Galatea from Galatea Lakes in July 2007

Highest point
- Elevation: 3,185 m (10,449 ft)
- Prominence: 1,280 m (4,200 ft)
- Listing: Mountains of Alberta
- Coordinates: 50°50′23″N 115°16′26″W

Geography
- Location within Alberta
- Country: Canada
- Province: Alberta
- Parent range: Kananaskis Range; Canadian Rockies
- Topo map: NTS 82J14 Spray Lakes Reservoir

Climbing
- First ascent: 1930 by Katie Gardiner, guided by Walter Feuz
- Easiest route: South Face: difficult scrambling

Mount Galatea is the highest peak of the Kananaskis Range, a subrange of the Canadian Rockies in the province of Alberta. It is located in the upper Spray Lakes Valley of the Kananaskis Country system of provincial parks. The mountain was named after the Royal Navy cruiser HMS Galatea.

== Geology ==
Mount Galatea is composed of sedimentary rock laid down during the Precambrian to Jurassic periods. Formed in shallow seas, this sedimentary rock was pushed east and over the top of younger rock during the Laramide orogeny.

== Climate ==
Based on the Köppen climate classification, Mount Galatea is located in a subarctic climate zone with cold, snowy winters, and mild summers. Winter temperatures can drop below −20 °C with wind chill factors below −30 °C.

== Gallery ==
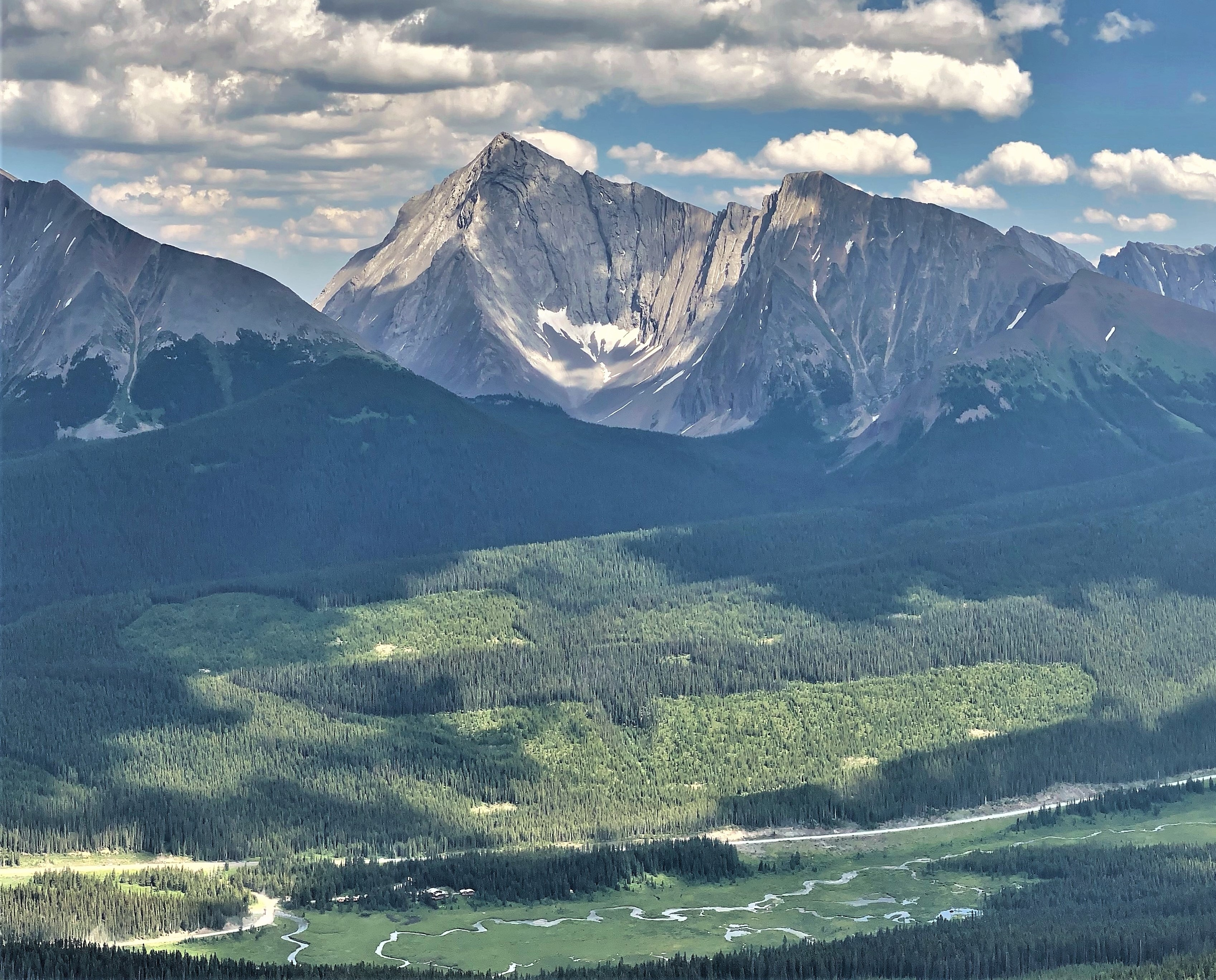
West aspect of Mount Galatea viewed from Tent Ridge
