= Spray Lakes Reservoir =

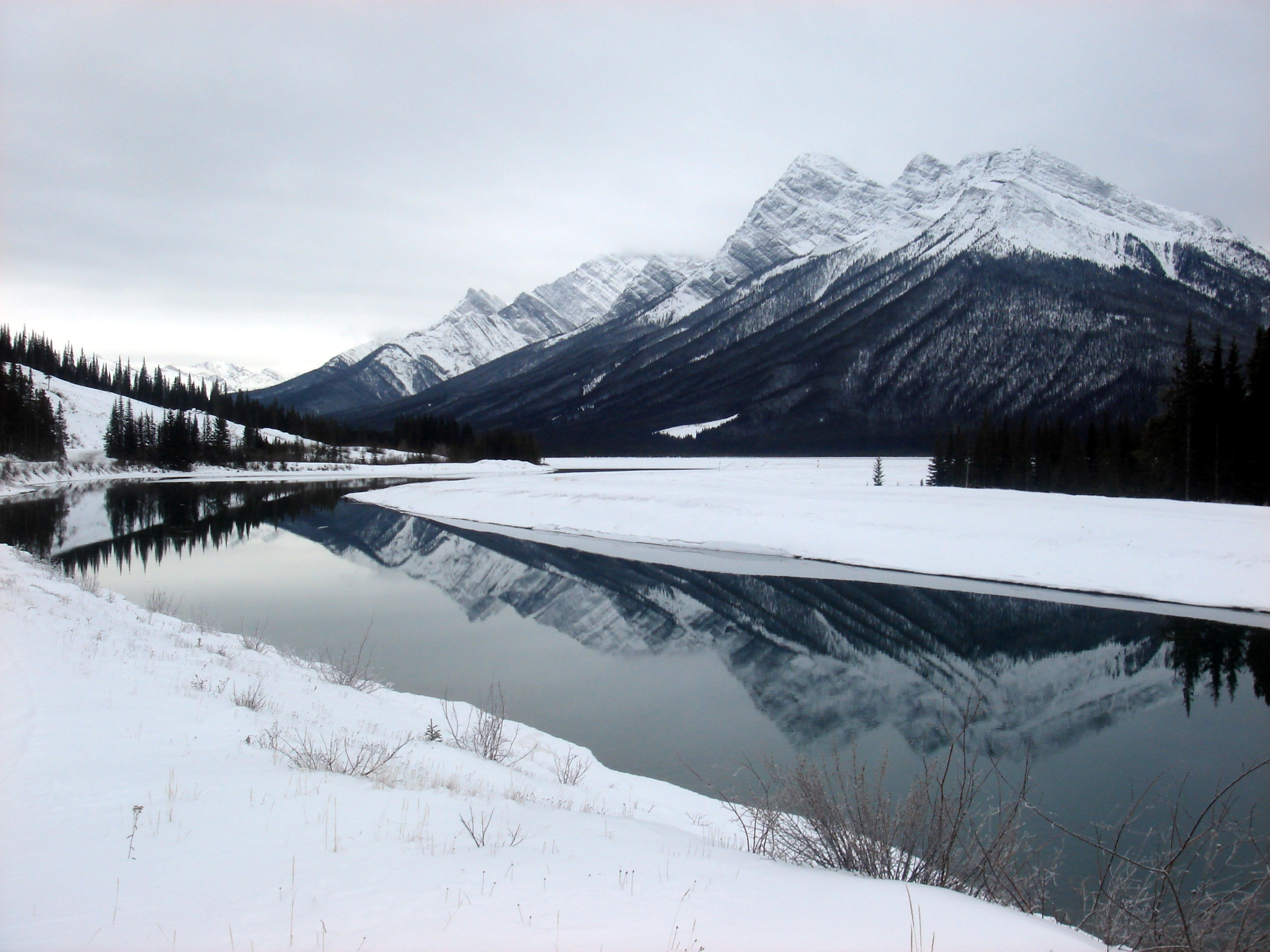
- Spray Lake in winter

- Location within Alberta
- Location: Kananaskis, Alberta
- Coordinates: 50°54′42″N 115°20′22″W
- Type: Reservoir
- Primary inflows: Spray River
- Primary outflows: Spray River
- Basin countries: Canada
- Built: 1950
- First flooded: 1950
- Max. length: 14.8 km (9.2 mi)
- Max. width: 1.7 km (1.1 mi)
- Surface area: 19.9 km^{2} (7.7 sq mi)
- Average depth: 13.5 m (44 ft)
- Max. depth: 65.4 m (215 ft)
- Surface elevation: 1,701 m (5,581 ft)
- References: Spray Lakes Reservoir

Spray Lakes Reservoir is a reservoir in Alberta, Canada. The Spray Lakes were a string of lakes formed along the Spray River, a tributary of the Bow River. With the damming of the river, the lakes were united in the Spray Lakes Reservoir.

It lies between the Goat Range and the Three Sisters ridge, at an elevation of 1,720 metres (5,640 ft). The lake is followed by Highway 742 (Smith-Dorrien Trail) in the northern part.

The Lake is impounded by two embankment dams; the 28-metre-high Canyon Dam is near the southern end of the reservoir and blocks the main outlet of the river in a north-northwestern direction, while the secondary 13-metre-high Three Sisters Dam at the northern end of the reservoir provides the outlet for the diverted water way and contains a small 3 MW powerhouse. The two dams and the lake were created in 1951 as part of the Spray Hydro Electric Project. From the Three Sisters Dam the water is diverted into a secondary reservoir known as the Goat Pond which directs the water into a 6-kilometre-long canal which includes an 800-metre tunnel though the shoulder of Ha Ling Peak. From there it enters White Man Pond before being funnelled into a penstock to the main Spray Powerhouse at Grassi Lakes with a generating capacity of 112 MW. The water continues to another shorter penstock leading to the Rundle Powerhouse where an additional 50 MW of generation is available. From there water is released into the Bow River. The four dams and three power stations are owned and operated by TransAlta. The Spray River Project contains a total of five dams and three powerhouses with a total generating capacity of 165 MW, the Spray River diversion making it the highest-yielding conventional (non-pumped-storage) hydroelectric facility in the province.

As a result of the diversion the river's original water course downstream of the Canyon Dam is nothing more than trickle for most of the year.

== Tributaries ==
The lake is fed by the following waterways, in anticlockwise order starting at the Canyon Dam:

- Turbulent Creek, coming from the northwest out of the Sundance Range
- Bryant Creek, coming from the west-northwest south of the Sundance Range
- Spray River, coming from the south
- Watridge Creek, coming from the south from Mount Shark
- Smuts Creek, coming from the south-southeast alongside the Smith-Dorrien trail
- Buller Creek, coming from the east between Mount Engadine and Mount Buller
- Sparrowhawk Creek, coming from the southeast just south of Mount Sparrowhawk
- Spurling Creek, coming from the northeast alongside the West Wind Pass hiking route

== Parks ==
The lake lies completely inside the north-western corner of the Spray Valley Provincial Park in the recreational area of Kananaskis Country. For more than half of the lake, from the Three Sisters Dam in the north to Mount Buller in the south, the western border of the Bow Valley Wildland Provincial Park runs along the Smith-Dorrien Trail, close to the eastern shore.

For the whole length of the lake, the eastern border of Banff National Park lies within five kilometers of the western shore. In the north, the border of the national park runs along the crest of the Goat Range. Near the southern end of the lake, the border is close to the shore.

An assortment of recreational areas are established on both shores.

- Spray Lakes West Provincial Recreation Area
- Sparrowhawk Provincial Recreation Area
- Buller Mountain Provincial Recreation Area
- Mount Shark Trailhead Provincial Recreation Area

The western shore is paralleled by hiking trails, and picnic sites and campgrounds are set up on both sides of the lake.

== See also ==
- Lakes in Alberta
