= Ribbon Peak =

Summit in the Canadian Rockies

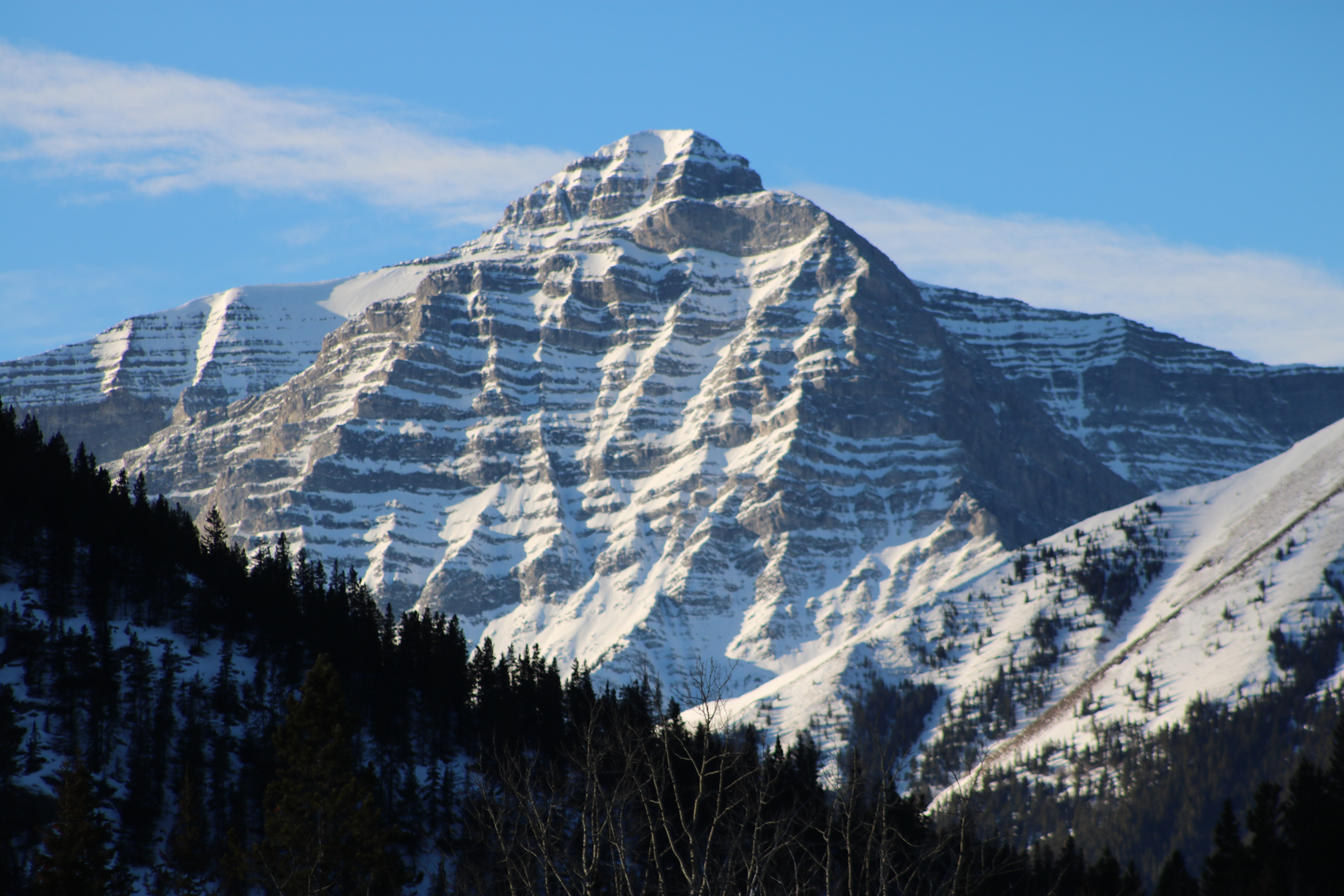
- Ribbon Peak seen with summit of Mount Bogart directly behind

Highest point
- Elevation: 2,880 m (9,450 ft)
- Prominence: 228 m (748 ft)
- Parent peak: Mount Bogart (3,144 m)
- Listing: Mountains of Alberta
- Coordinates: 50°55′09″N 115°13′32″W

Geography
- Location within Alberta Location within Canada
- Country: Canada
- Province: Alberta
- Parent range: Kananaskis Range; Canadian Rockies
- Topo map: NTS 82J14 Spray Lakes Reservoir

Geology
- Rock age: Cambrian
- Rock type: Sedimentary

Climbing
- First ascent: 1957 Crickard, Higgins, Gmoser
- Easiest route: Scramble with exposure via south ridge

Ribbon Peak is a 2,880-metre (9,450-foot) summit located in Kananaskis Country in the Canadian Rockies of Alberta, Canada. Ribbon's nearest higher neighbor is Mount Bogart, 1.0 km (0.62 mi) to the southwest. Ribbon Peak is situated four kilometres northwest of Mount Kidd, and both can be seen from Highway 40 near the Kananaskis Village junction along Highway 40.

== History ==
The first ascent of the peak was made in 1957 by F.W. Crickard, R. Higgins, and Hans Gmoser (guide).

In June 1986, the vicinity was the scene of the first of three related airplane crashes known as the Rescue 807 Crashes. Three lakes on the north aspect of Ribbon Peak were named Memorial Lakes in remembrance of the crash victims.

== Geology ==
Ribbon Peak is composed of sedimentary rock laid down during the Precambrian to Jurassic periods. Formed in shallow seas, this sedimentary rock was pushed east and over the top of younger rock during the Laramide orogeny.

== Climate ==
Based on the Köppen climate classification, Ribbon Peak is located in a subarctic climate with cold, snowy winters, and mild summers. Winter temperatures can drop below −20 °C with wind chill factors below −30 °C.

The months July through October offer the most favorable weather for viewing or climbing Ribbon Peak.

Precipitation runoff from the mountain drains into Ribbon Creek, thence into the Kananaskis River.

== Gallery ==
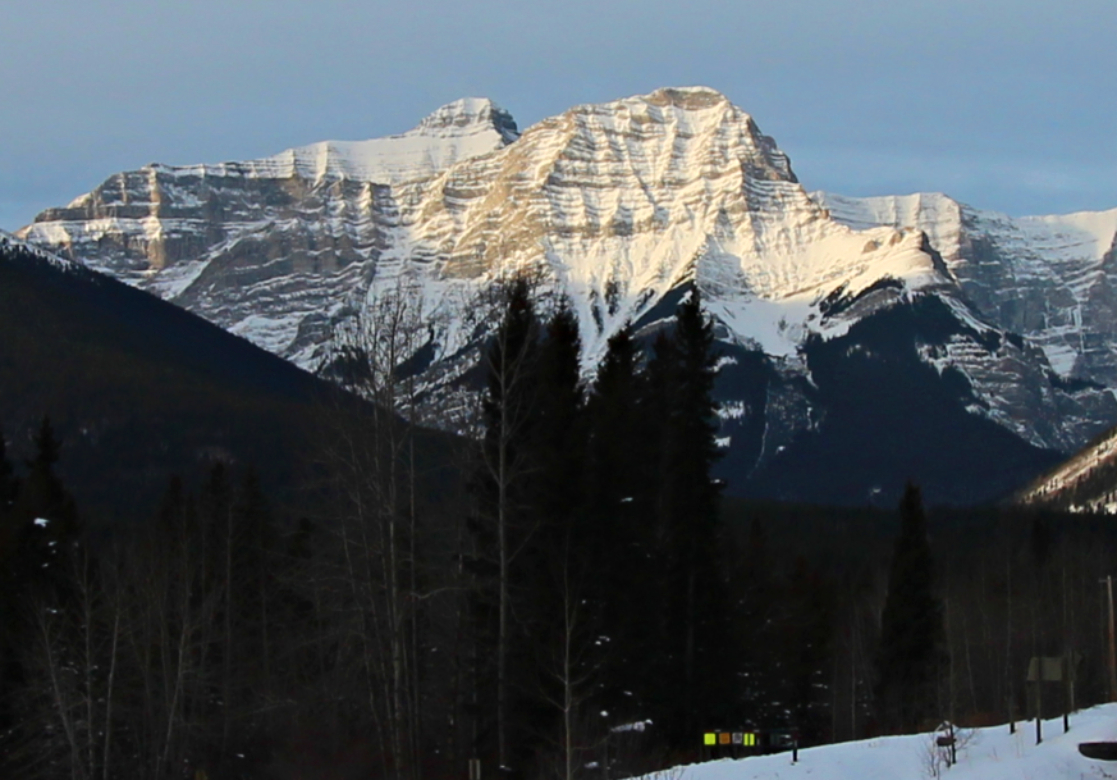
Mount Bogart (left) and Ribbon Peak

== See also ==
- Geography of Alberta
