= Mount Bogart =

Mountain in the country of Canada

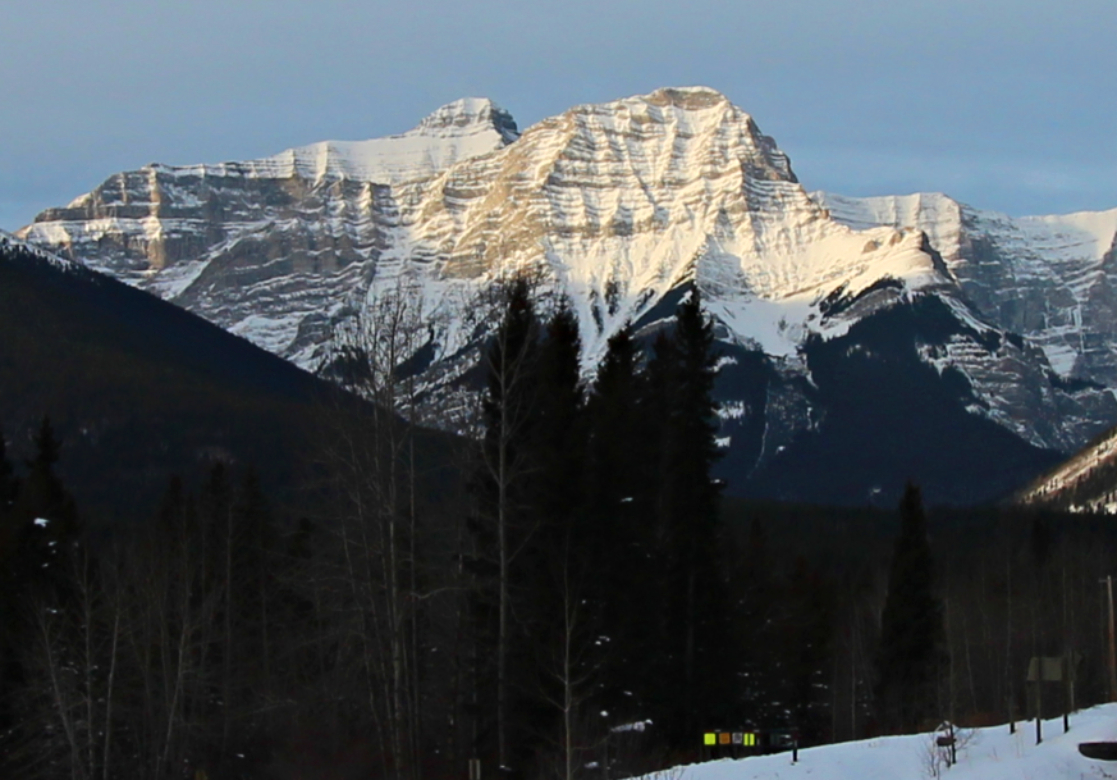
- Mount Bogart (behind, left of center) seen with Ribbon Peak from Highway 40

Highest point
- Elevation: 3,144 m (10,315 ft)
- Prominence: 492 m (1,614 ft)
- Parent peak: Wind Mountain (3153 m)
- Listing: Mountains of Alberta
- Coordinates: 50°54′41″N 115°14′36″W

Geography
- Location within Alberta Location within Canada
- Interactive map of Mount Bogart
- Country: Canada
- Province: Alberta
- Parent range: Kananaskis Range; Canadian Rockies
- Topo map: NTS 82J14 Spray Lakes Reservoir

Geology
- Rock age: Cambrian

Climbing
- First ascent: 1930 by W. Feuz, K. Gardiner
- Easiest route: Moderate Scramble

Mount Bogart is a 3,144-metre (10,315-foot) summit located in Kananaskis Country in the Canadian Rockies of Alberta, Canada. Mount Bogart's nearest higher peak is Wind Mountain, 4.7 km (2.9 mi) to the north. Mount Bogart is situated northwest of Mount Kidd, and both can be seen from Highway 40 near the Kananaskis Village junction.

== History ==
Mount Bogart was named by Donaldson Bogart Dowling (1858-1925), after his mother, whose maiden name was Bogart. Donaldson Dowling, an engineer with the Geological Survey of Canada, explored the area in 1904.

The first ascent of the peak was made in 1930 by Kate Gardiner and Walter Feuz. The duo also made first ascents of Mount Lyautey and Mount Galatea in 1930.

The mountain's name was officially adopted in 2006 by the Geographical Names Board of Canada.

== Geology ==
Mount Bogart is composed of sedimentary rock laid down during the Precambrian to Jurassic periods. Formed in shallow seas, this sedimentary rock was pushed east and over the top of younger rock during the Laramide orogeny.

== Climate ==
Based on the Köppen climate classification, Mount Bogart is located in a subarctic climate with cold, snowy winters, and mild summers. Temperatures can drop below −20 °C with wind chill factors below −30 °C. Precipitation runoff from the mountain drains east into the Kananaskis River and west into Spray Lakes Reservoir which both empty to the Bow River.

== Gallery ==
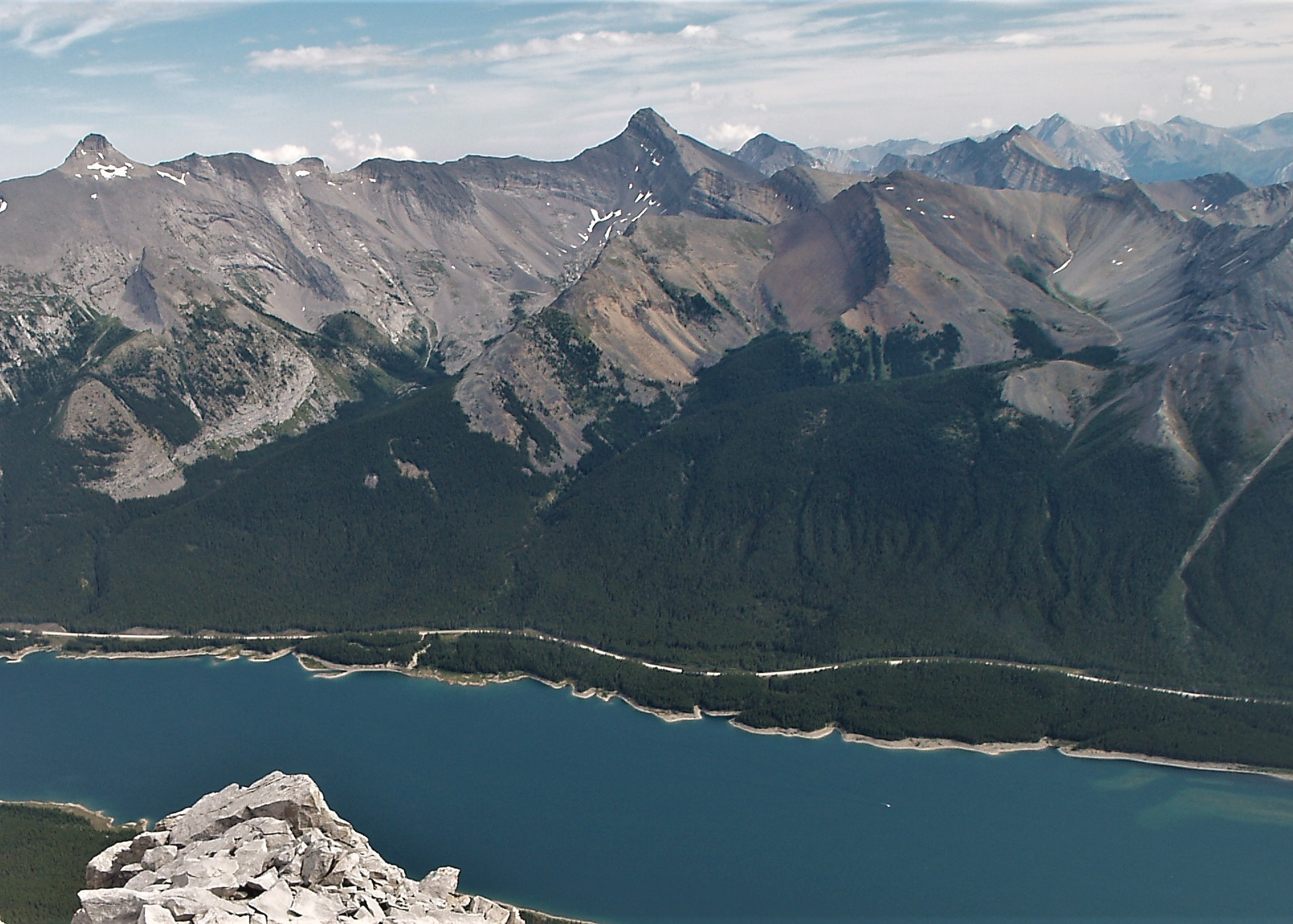
Mount Bogart centered, from Mount Nestor

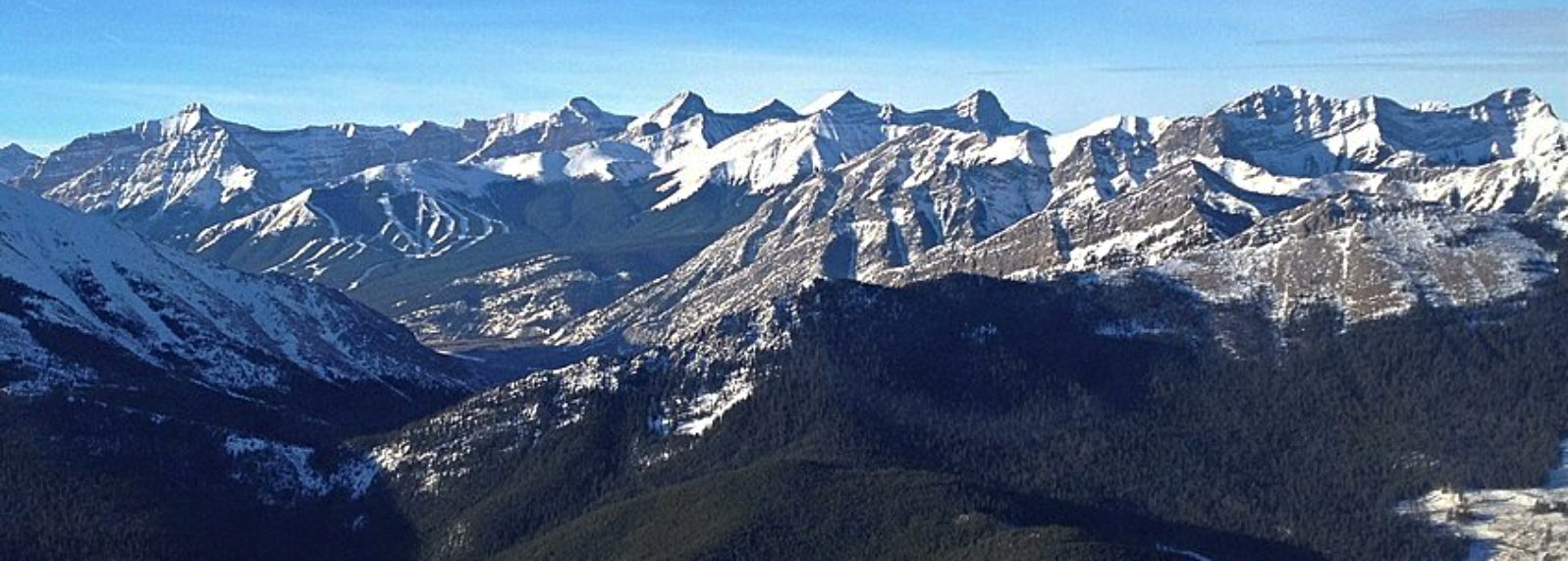
Mount Bogart far left, Lougheed center, Skogan Peak right

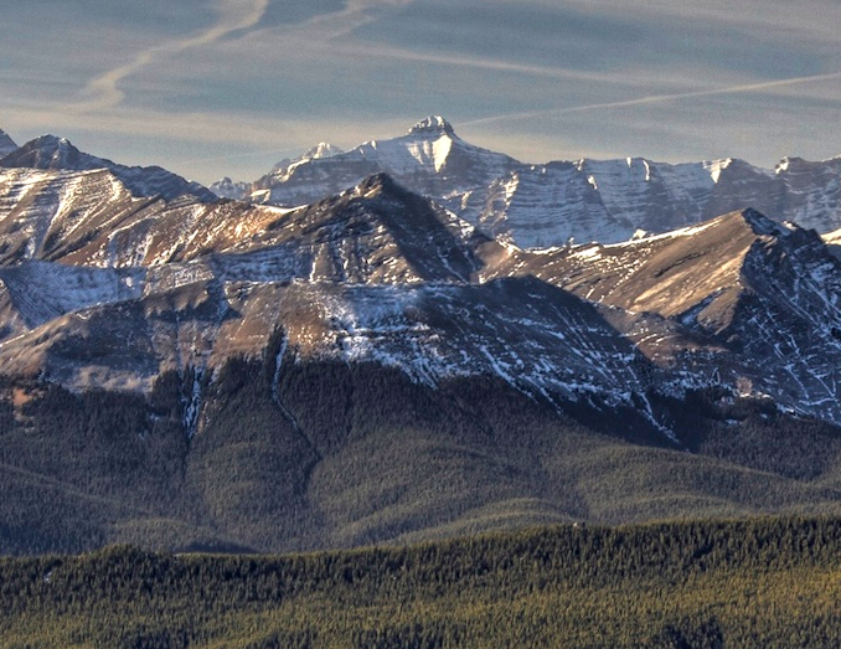
Mount Bogart centered in the distance
