= 51st G7 summit =

2025 international leader meeting in Canada

51st G7 Summit

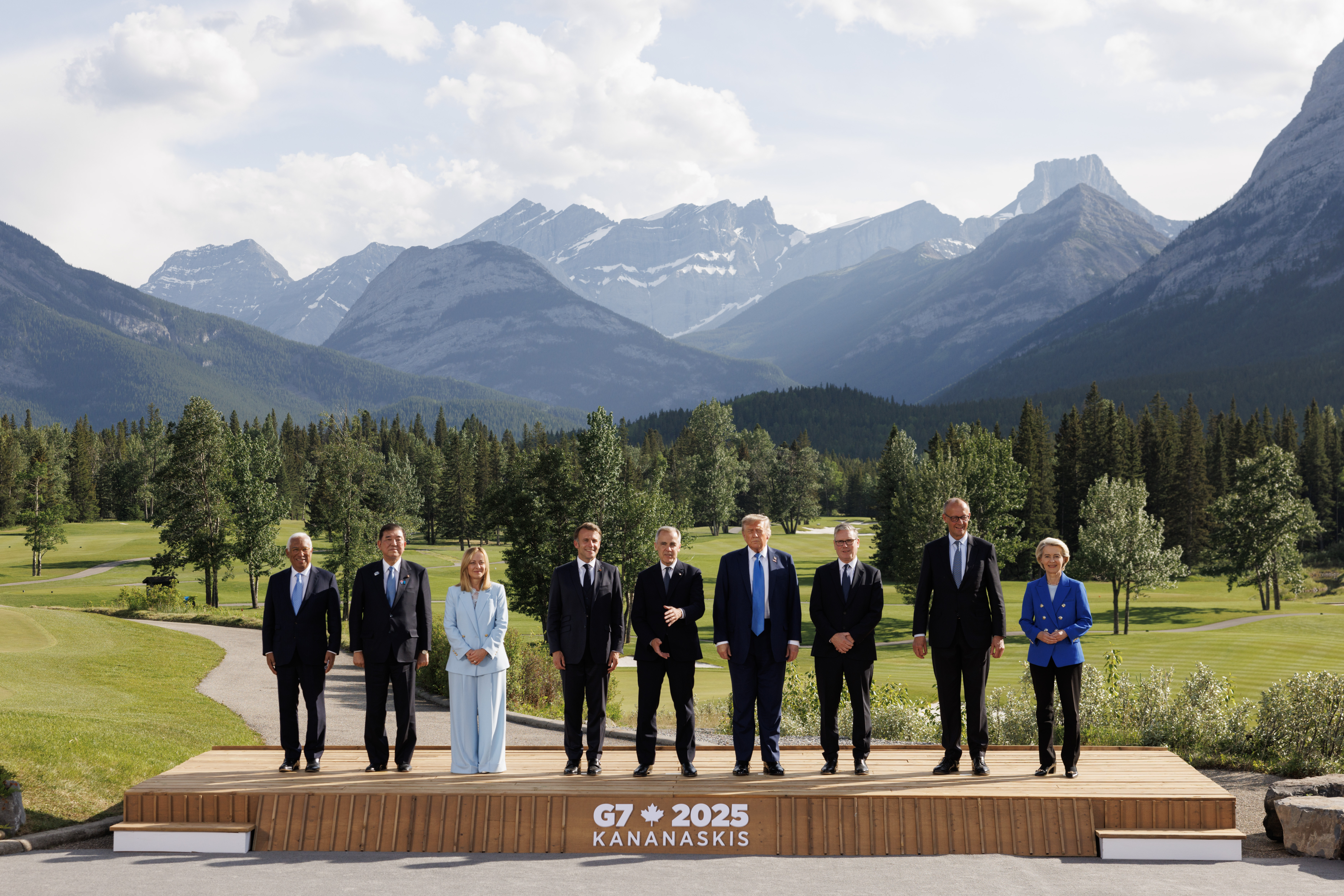
- Host country: Canada
- Date: 16–17 June 2025
- Cities: Kananaskis
- Venues: Kananaskis Resort
- Participants: Canada; France; Germany; Italy; Japan; United Kingdom; United States; European Union; Invited countries: Australia; Brazil; India; Mexico; South Africa; South Korea; Ukraine
- Follows: 50th G7 summit
- Precedes: 52nd G7 summit
- Website: g7.canada.ca/en

The 51st G7 summit, the 57th annual meeting of the G7, was held from 16 to 17 June 2025 in Kananaskis, Alberta, Canada. This was the 2nd G7 summit to be held in Kananaskis since the 28th G8 summit in 2002, and the seventh summit held in Canada. The 2025 summit therefore makes Kananaskis the first Canadian village to host a G7 or G8 leaders' summit twice.

== Leaders at the summit ==
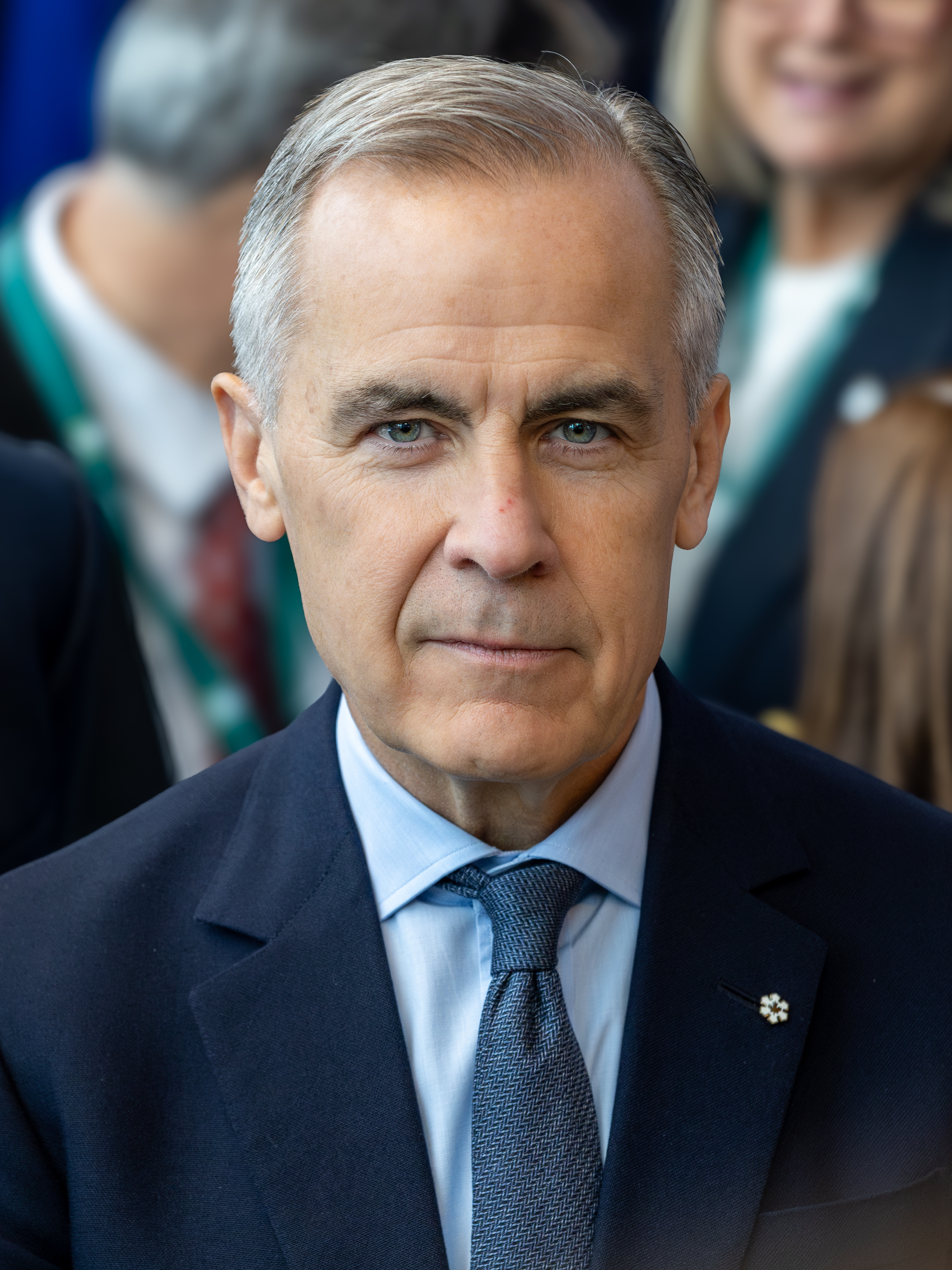
Mark Carney chaired the 51st G7 summit.

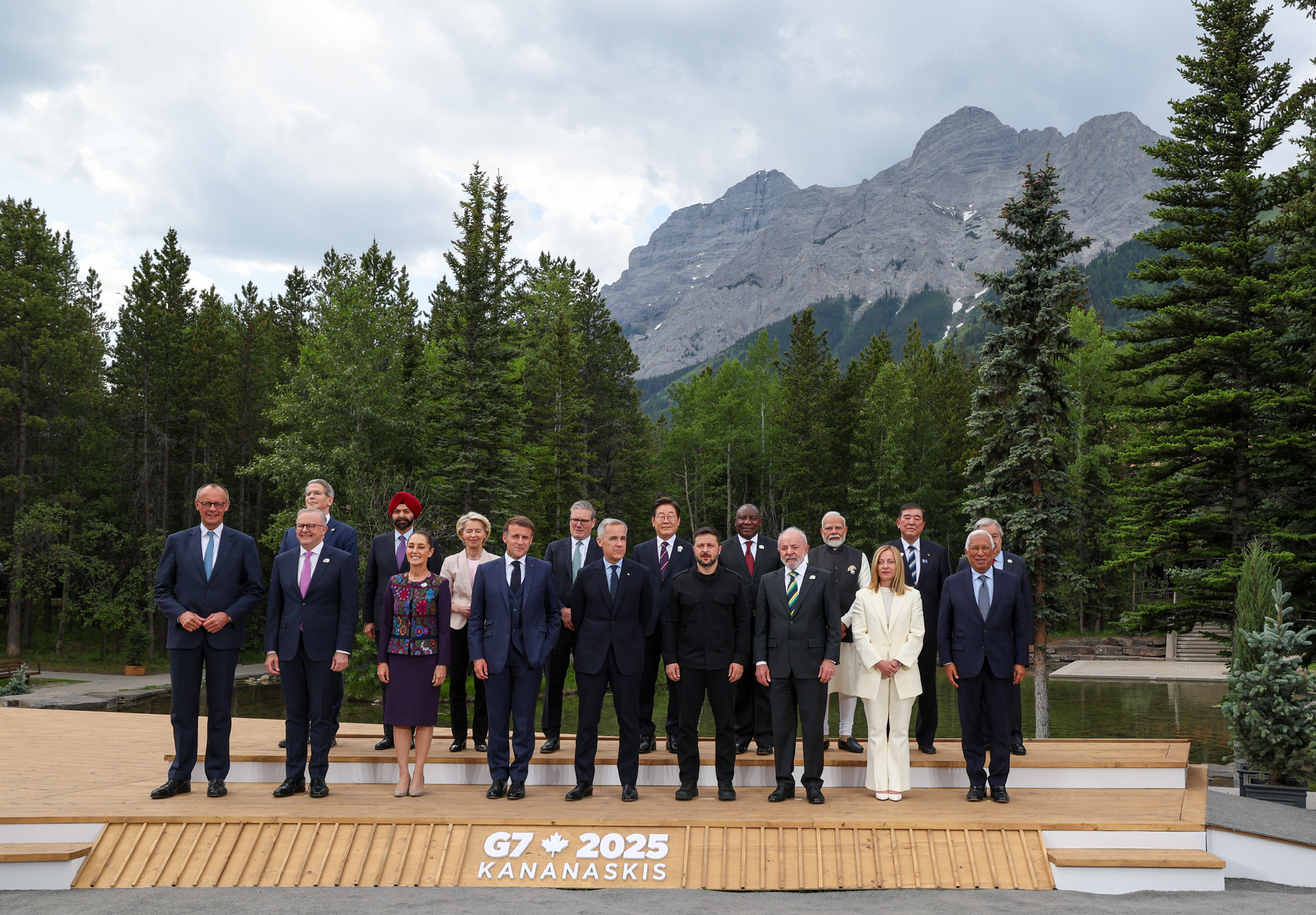
G7 leaders with the leaders of invited countries

The 2025 summit was the first summit for European Council President António Costa, British prime minister Keir Starmer, Canadian prime minister Mark Carney, and German chancellor Friedrich Merz. It was also the first and only summit for Japanese prime minister Shigeru Ishiba. The visit marked the first international visit to Canada for British prime minister Keir Starmer, Japanese prime minister Shigeru Ishiba, German chancellor Friedrich Merz, Australian prime minister Anthony Albanese, South Korean president Lee Jae Myung, and marked the second visit to Canada by Italian prime minister Giorgia Meloni and US president Donald Trump and the first visit since the 44th G7 summit in 2018. It marked the third visit to Canada for French president Emmanuel Macron and Ukrainian president Volodymyr Zelenskyy.

In May, Mexican president Claudia Sheinbaum was invited to attend. Following the announcement, she told reporters that she had not decided if she would attend, but that it is "a possibility". On 30 May, Brazilian president Luiz Inácio Lula da Silva was invited and is expected to attend. In June, Crown Prince of Saudi Arabia Mohammed bin Salman was invited. However, on 12 June it was confirmed that he will not be attending the summit.

Indonesian president Prabowo Subianto was initially invited by Mark Carney to attend the G7 summit, which he accepted. However, on 12 June, Prabowo announced that he would skip the summit and meet Singaporean prime minister Lawrence Wong, Vietnamese president Lương Cường, and Russian president Vladimir Putin instead.

=== Participants and representatives ===
Core G7 Members The host state and leader are shown in bold text.
Member	Represented by	Title
**Canada (Host)**	Mark Carney	Prime Minister
France	Emmanuel Macron	President
Germany	Friedrich Merz	Chancellor
Italy	Giorgia Meloni	Prime Minister
Japan	Shigeru Ishiba	Prime Minister
United Kingdom	Keir Starmer	Prime Minister
United States	Donald Trump	President
European Union	António Costa	Council President
European Union	Ursula von der Leyen	Commission President
**Invitees**
Countries	Represented by	Title
Australia	Anthony Albanese	Prime Minister
Brazil	Luiz Inácio Lula da Silva	President
India	Narendra Modi	Prime Minister
Mexico	Claudia Sheinbaum	President
South Africa	Cyril Ramaphosa	President
South Korea	Lee Jae Myung	President
Ukraine	Volodymyr Zelenskyy	President
International organisations	Represented by	Title
NATO	Mark Rutte	Secretary-General
United Nations	António Guterres	Secretary-General
World Bank	Ajay Banga	President

=== Invited leaders who did not attend ===
Countries	Invited Leader	Title
Indonesia	Prabowo Subianto	President
Saudi Arabia	Mohammed bin Salman	Crown Prince
United Arab Emirates	Mohamed bin Zayed Al Nahyan	President

== Gallery of participating leaders ==
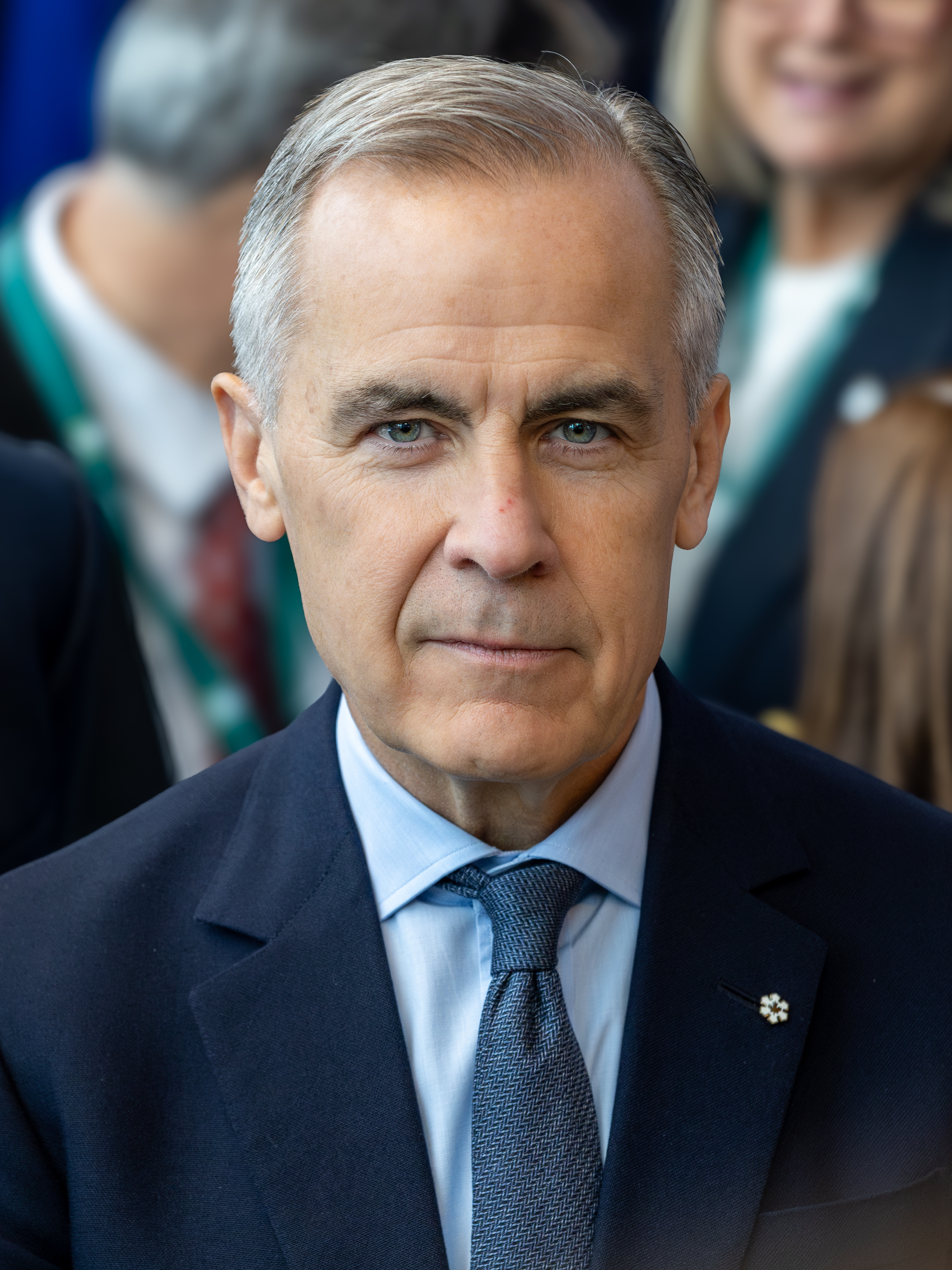
(Canada) Canada
Mark Carney,
Prime Minister (Host)

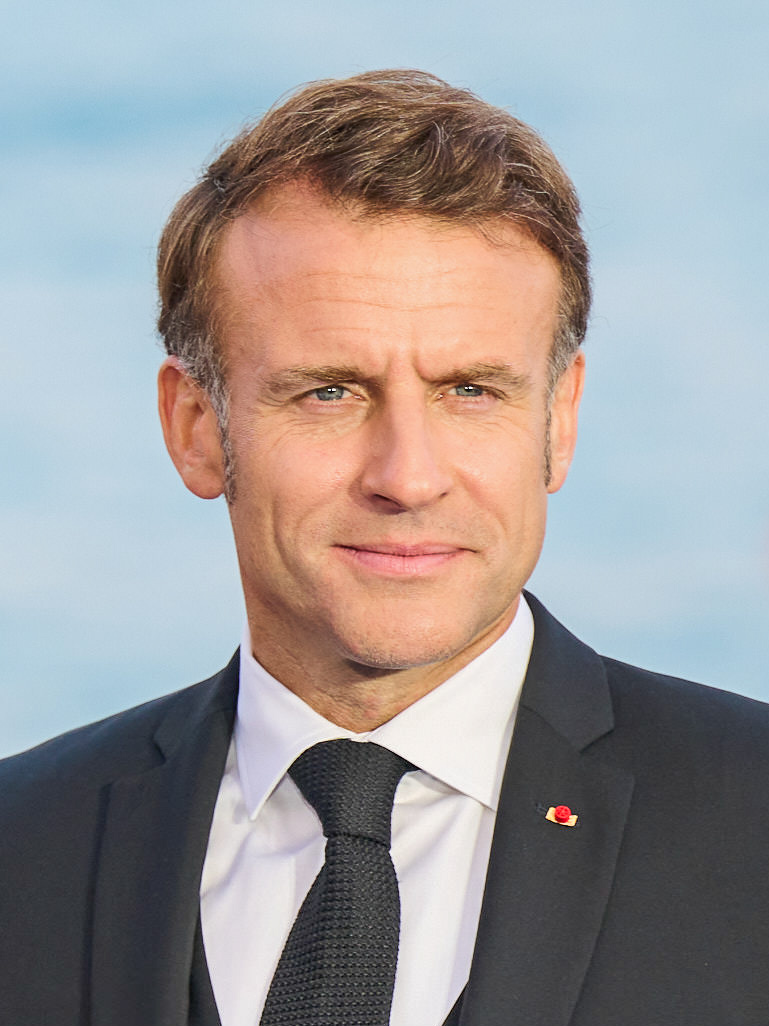
(France) France
Emmanuel Macron,
President

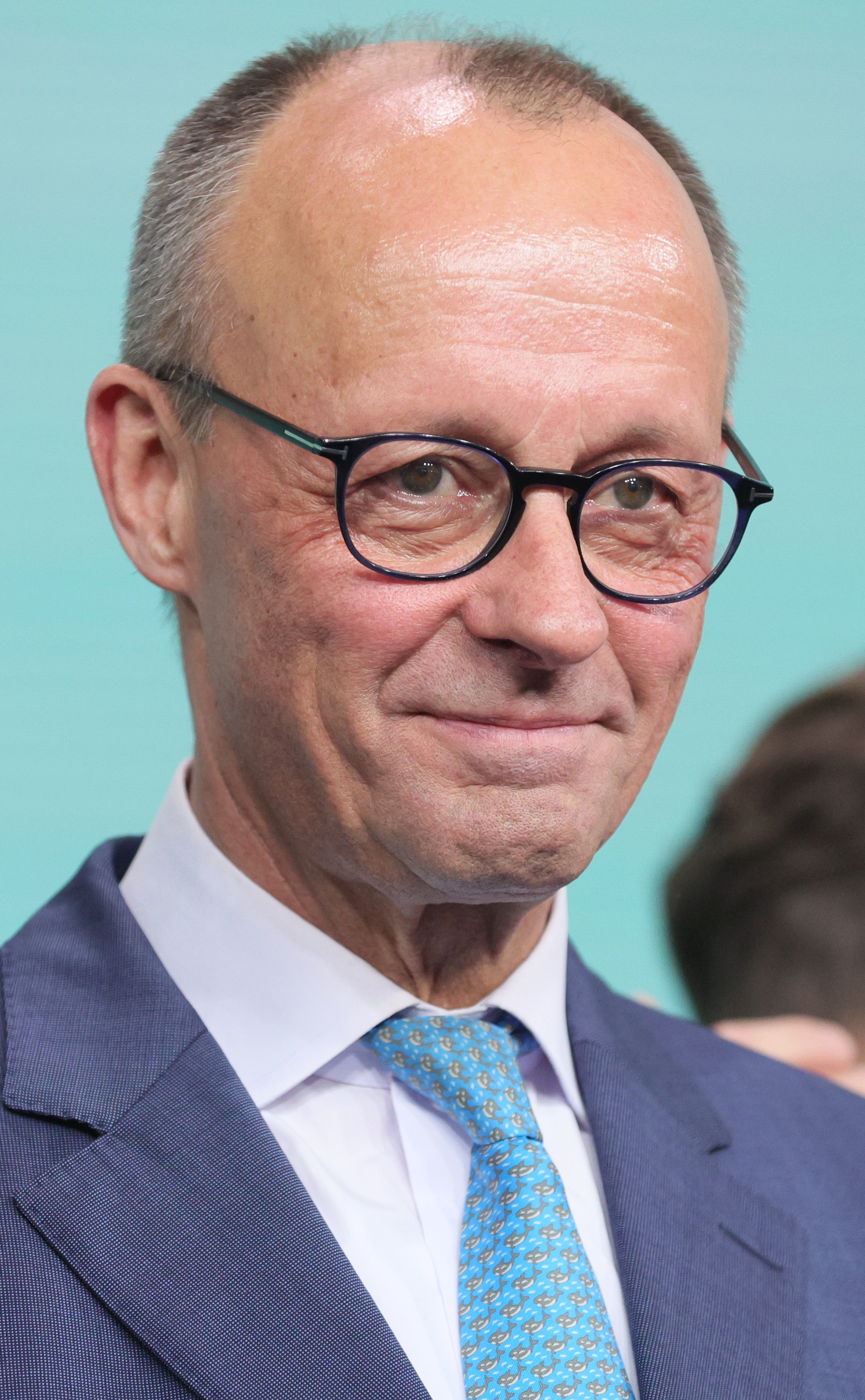
(Germany) Germany
Friedrich Merz,
Chancellor

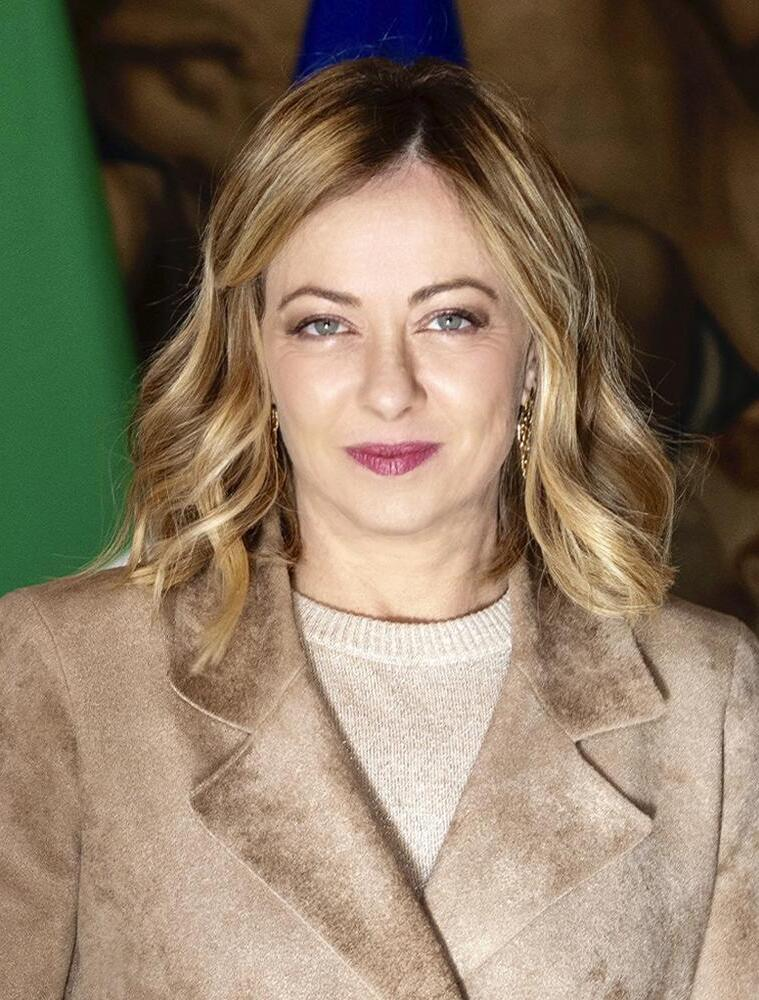
Italy
Giorgia Meloni,
Prime Minister

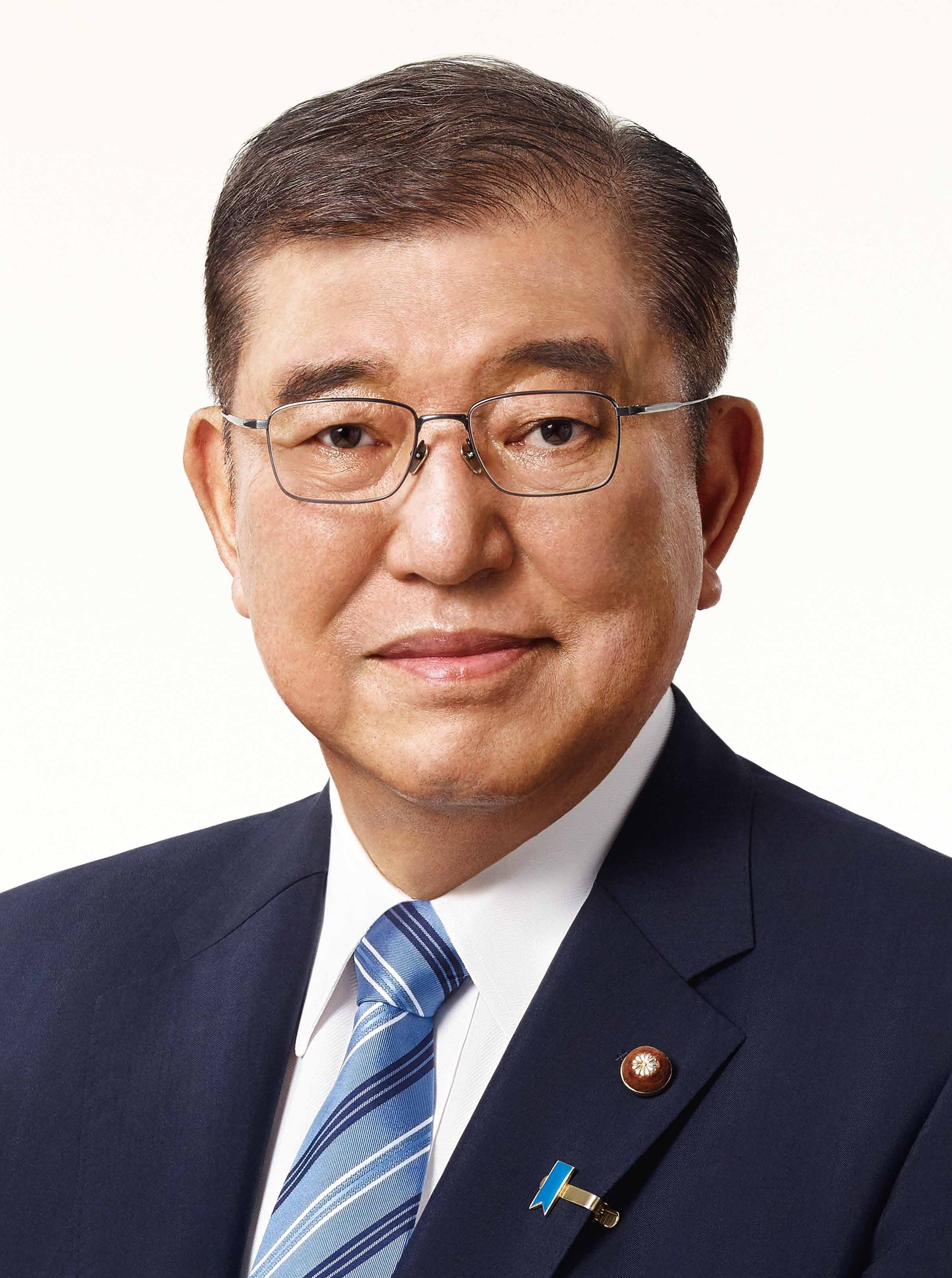
Japan
Shigeru Ishiba, Prime Minister

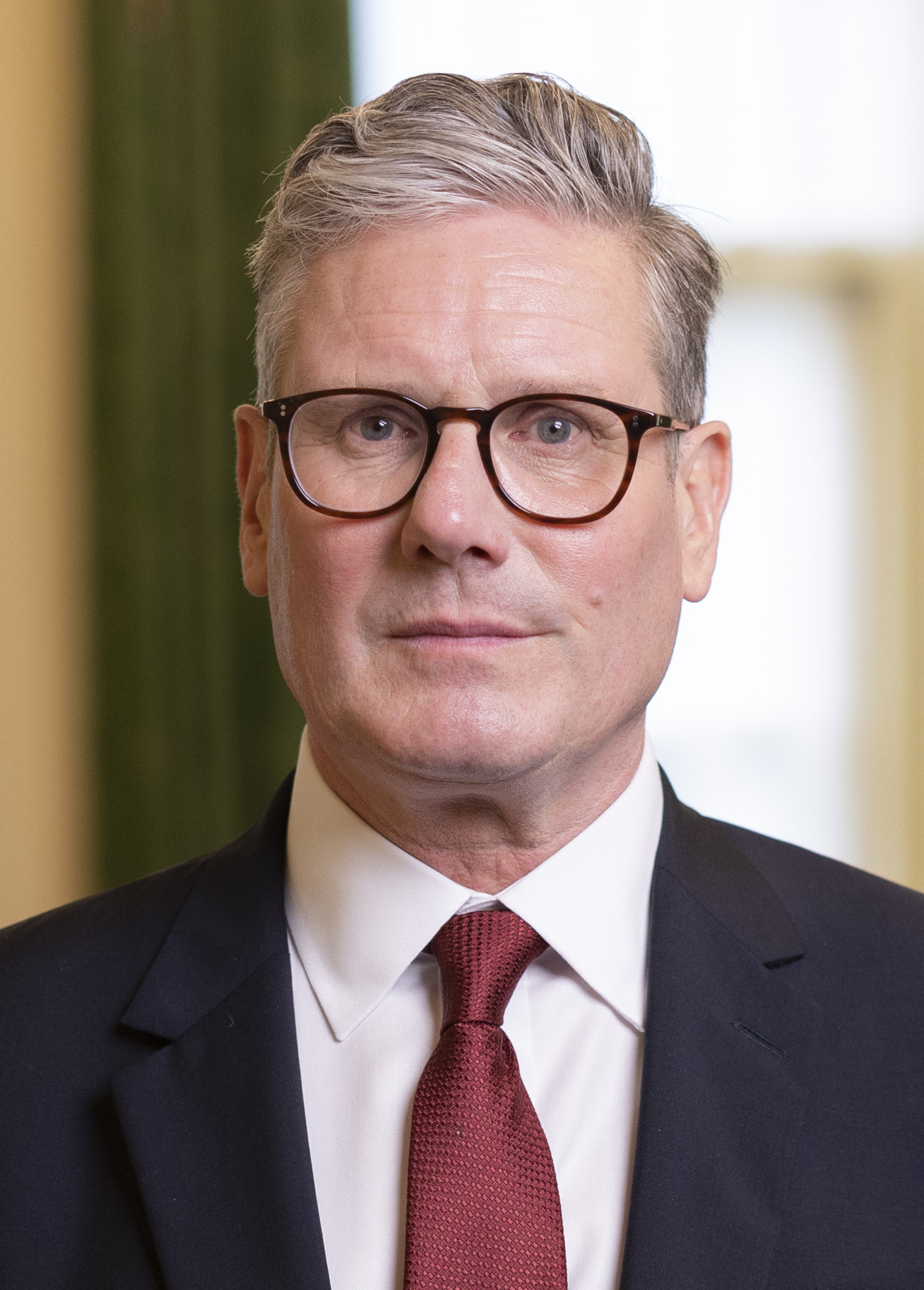
United Kingdom
Keir Starmer,
Prime Minister

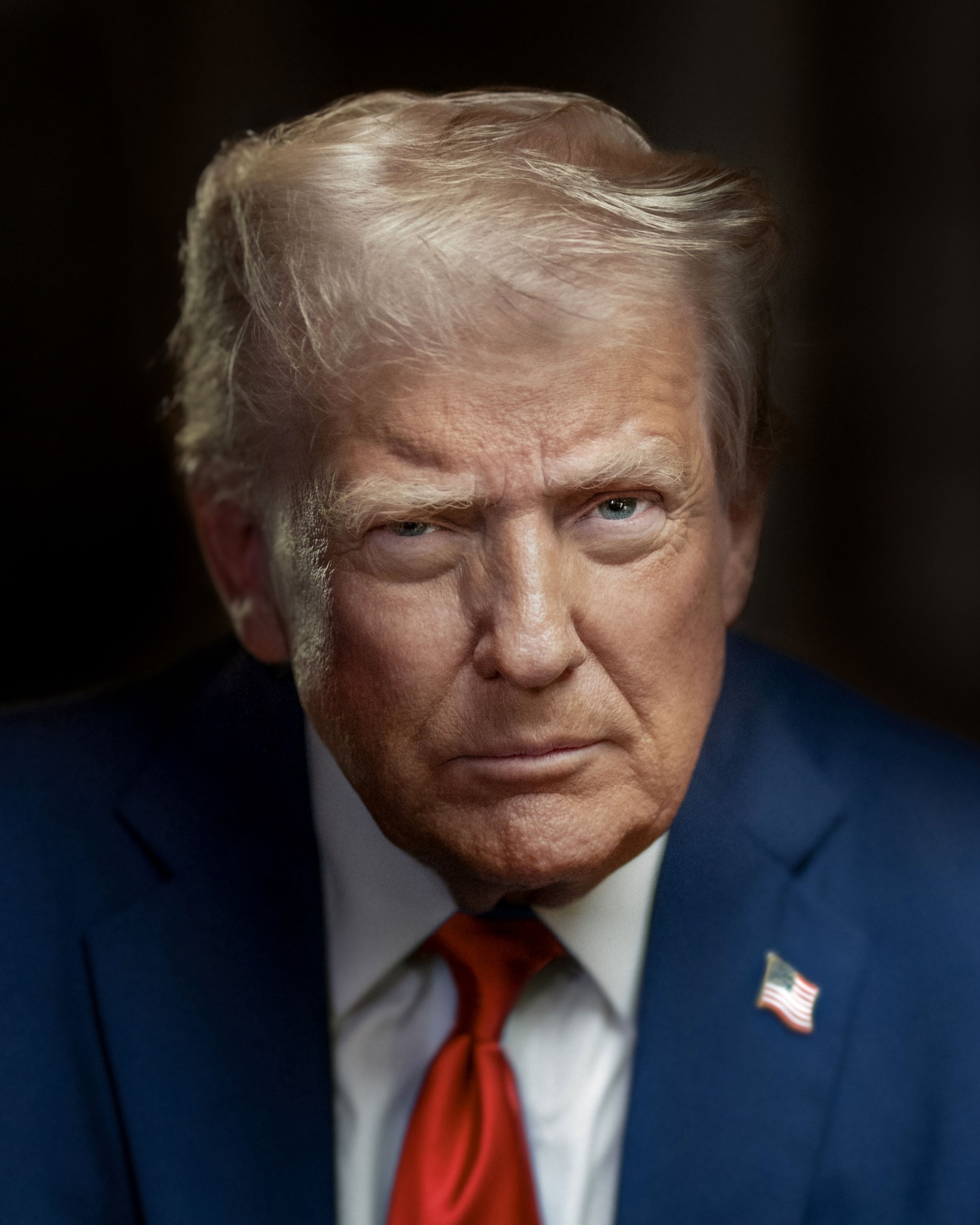
(United States) United States
Donald Trump,
President
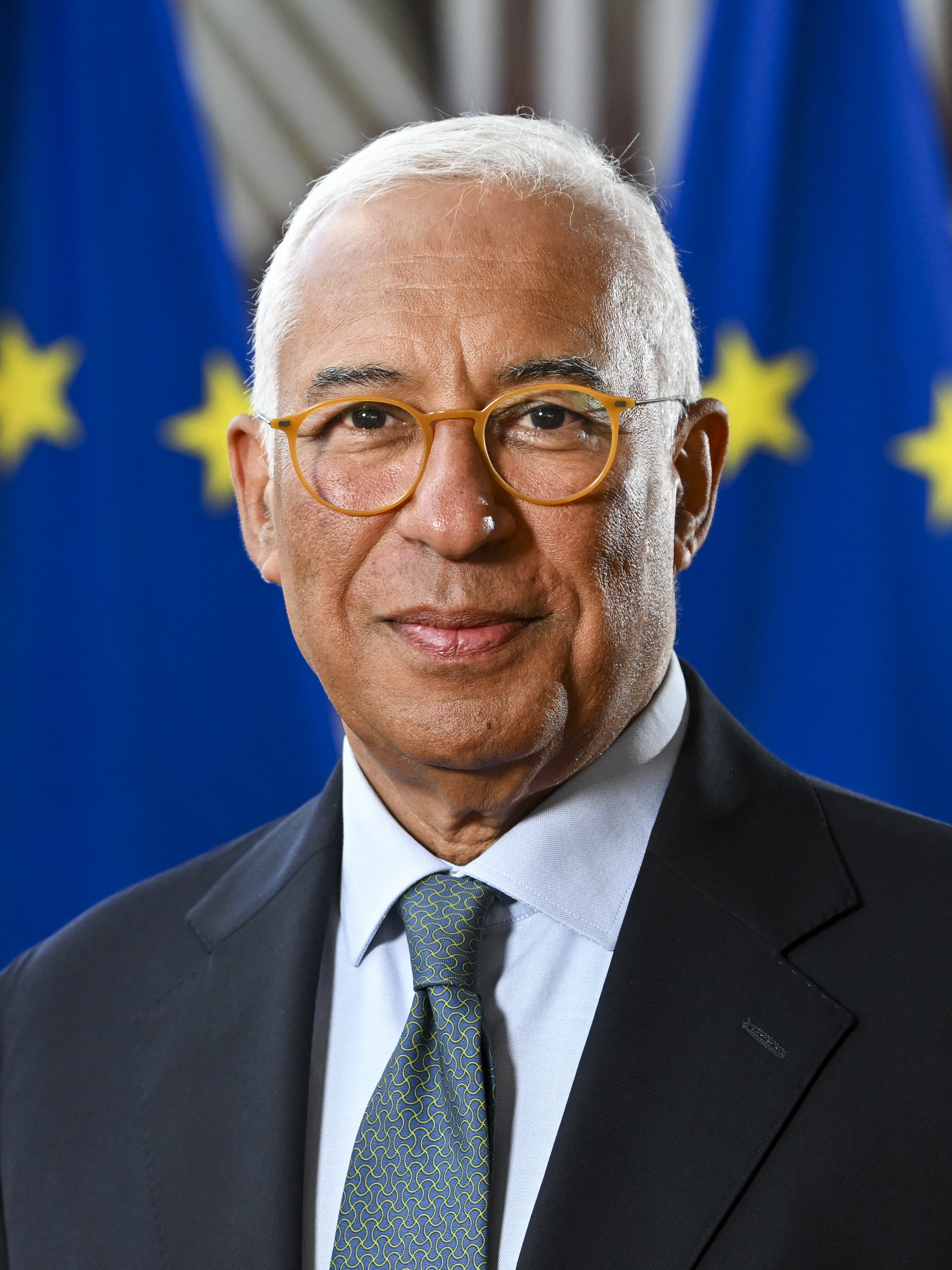
(European Union) European Union
António Costa,
President of the European Council

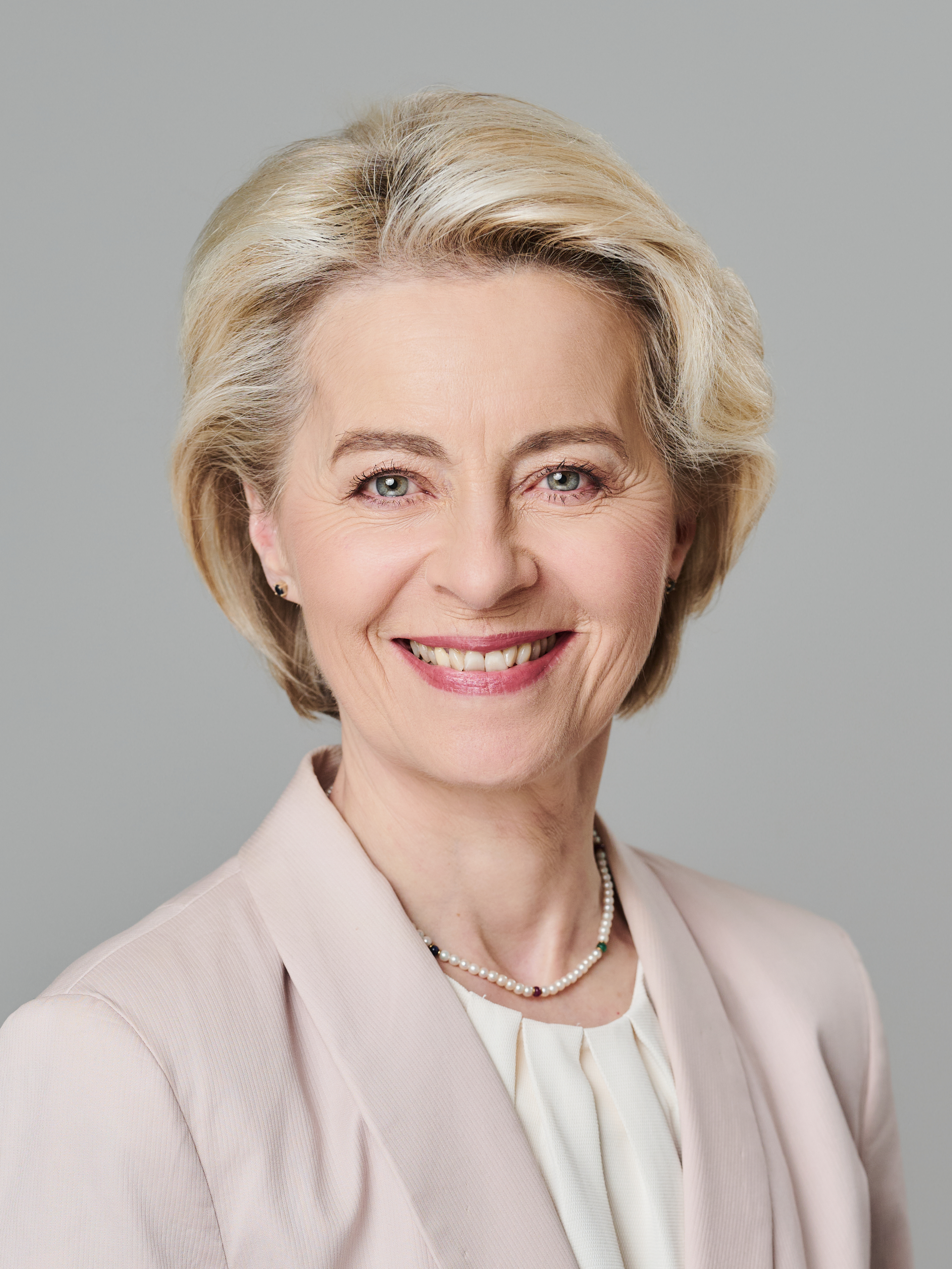
(European Union) European Union
Ursula von der Leyen,
President of the European Commission

== Invited leaders ==
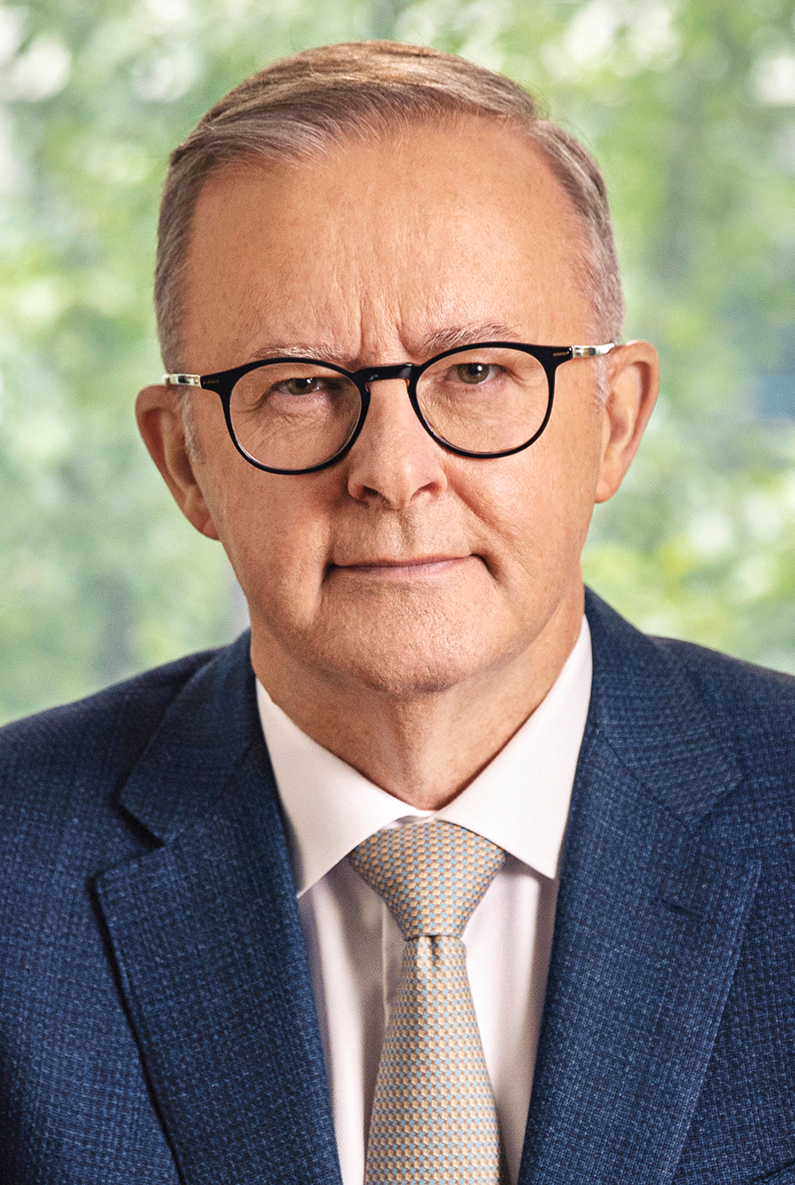
Australia
Anthony Albanese, Prime Minister

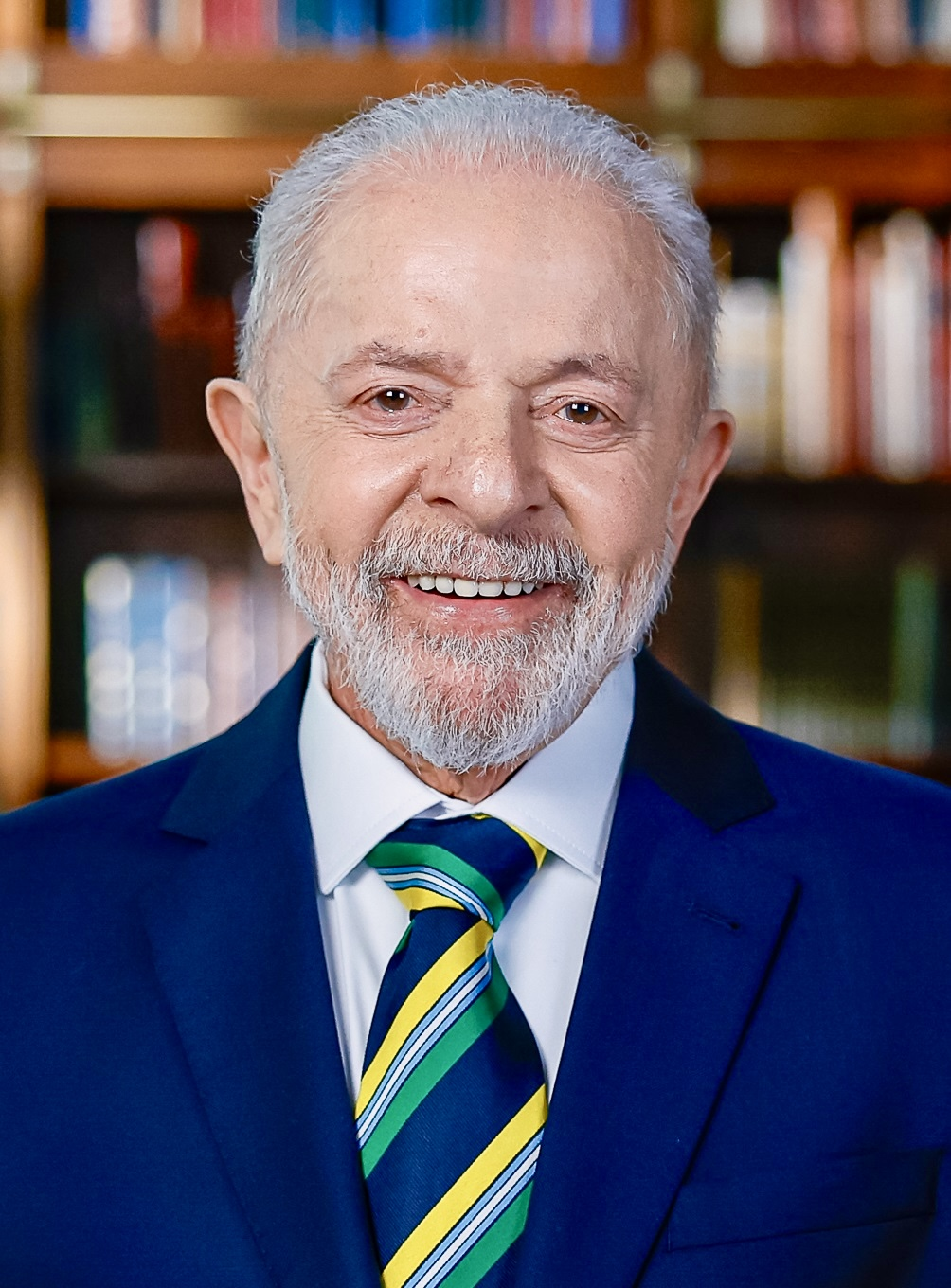
Brazil
Luiz Inácio Lula da Silva, President

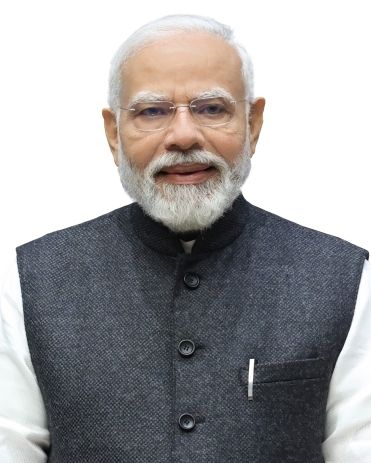
India
Narendra Modi, Prime Minister

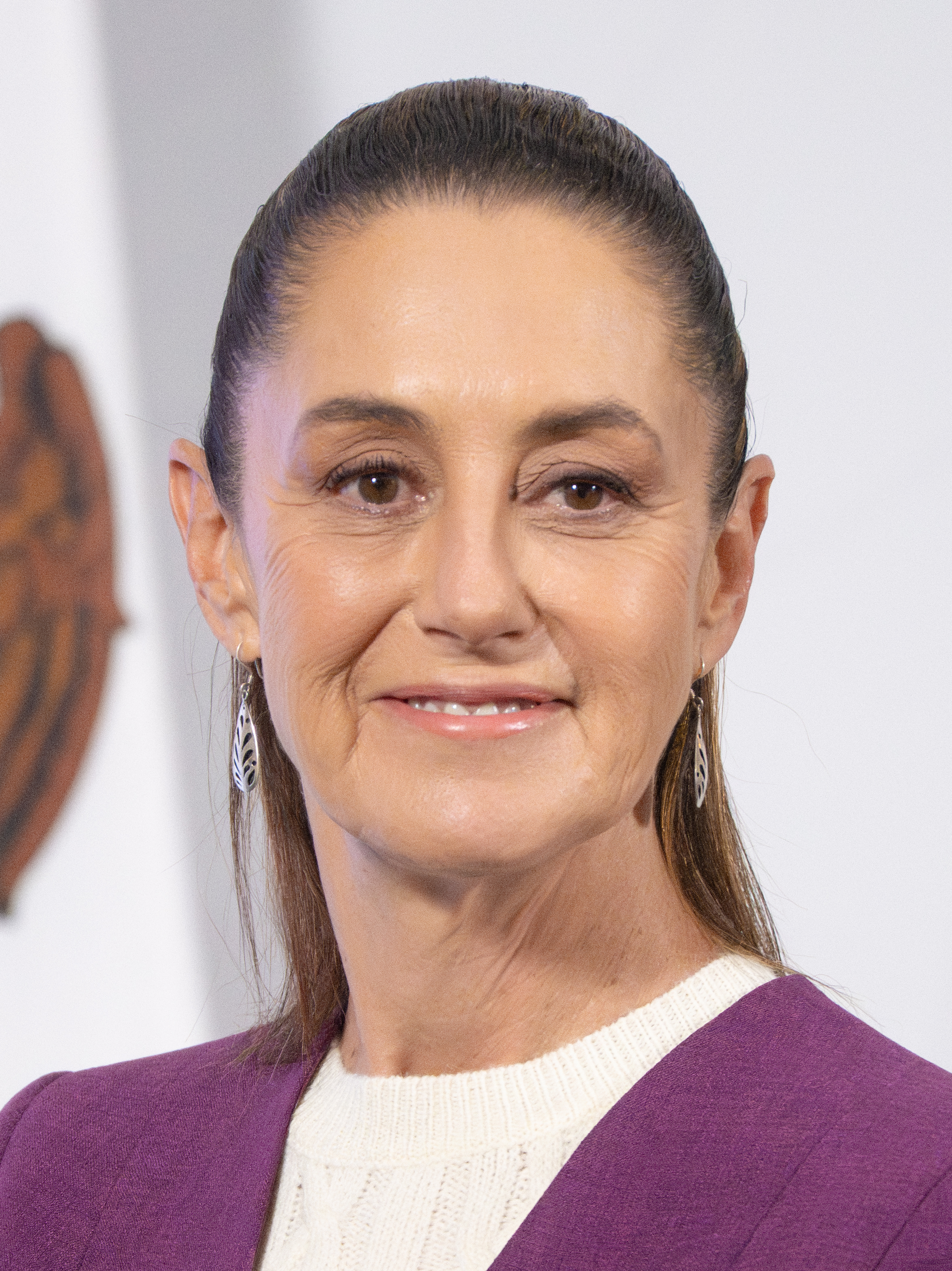
Mexico
Claudia Sheinbaum, President

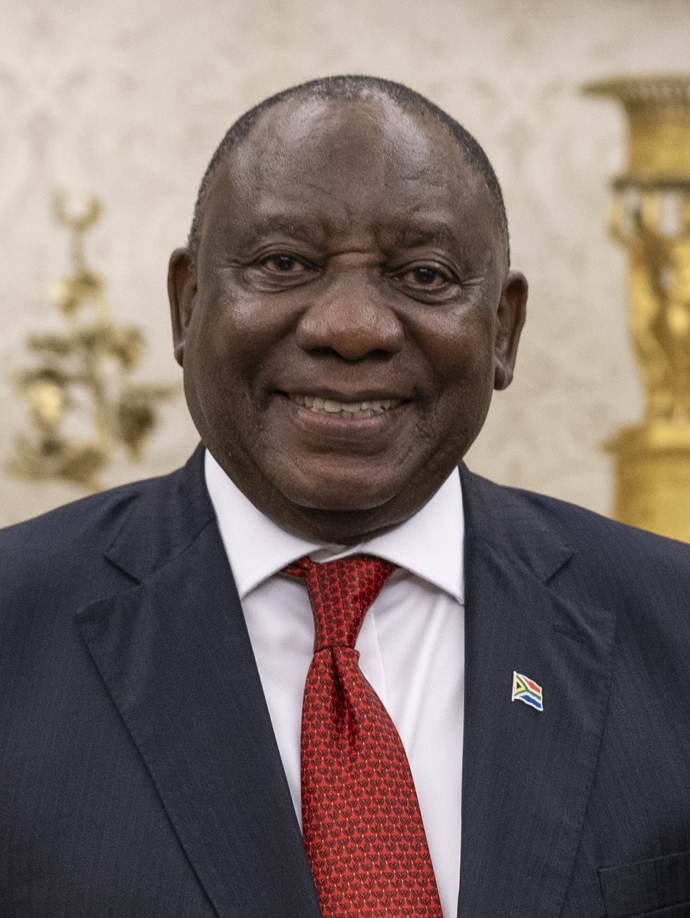
South Africa
Cyril Ramaphosa, President

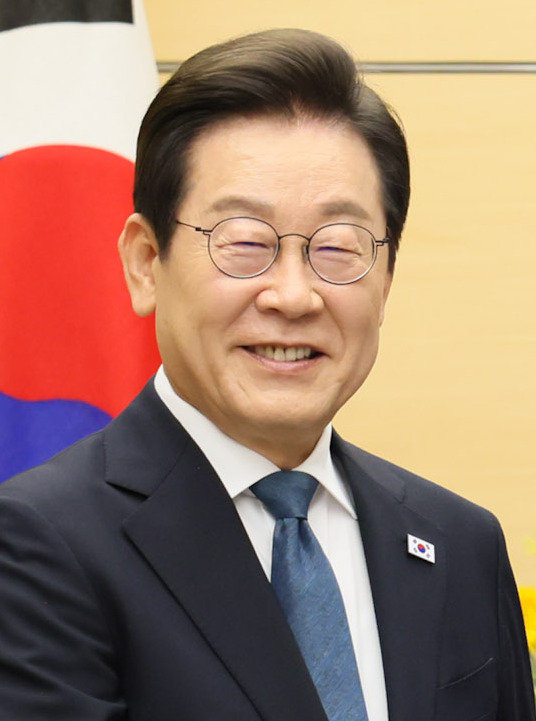
South Korea
Lee Jae Myung, President

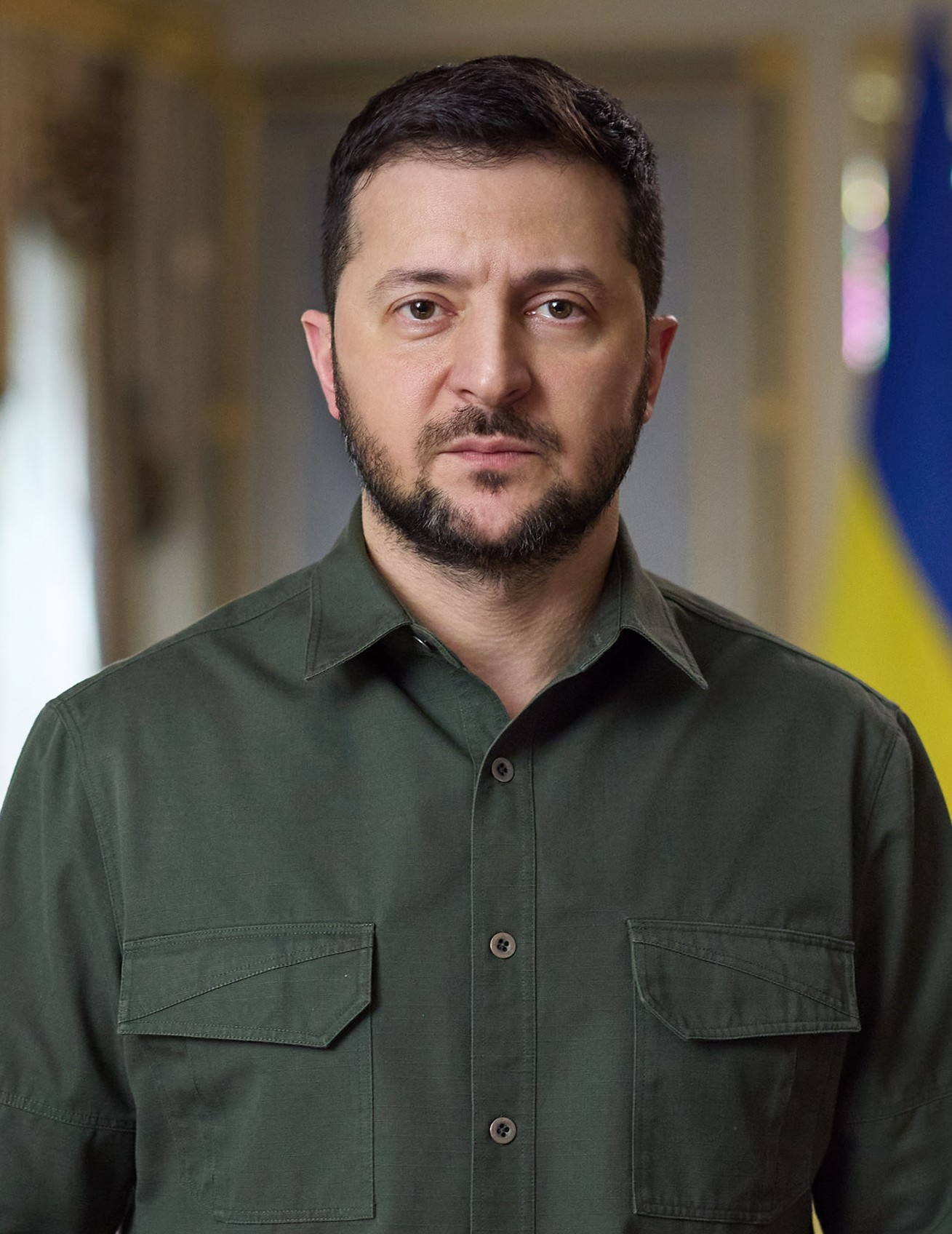
Ukraine
Volodymyr Zelenskyy, President

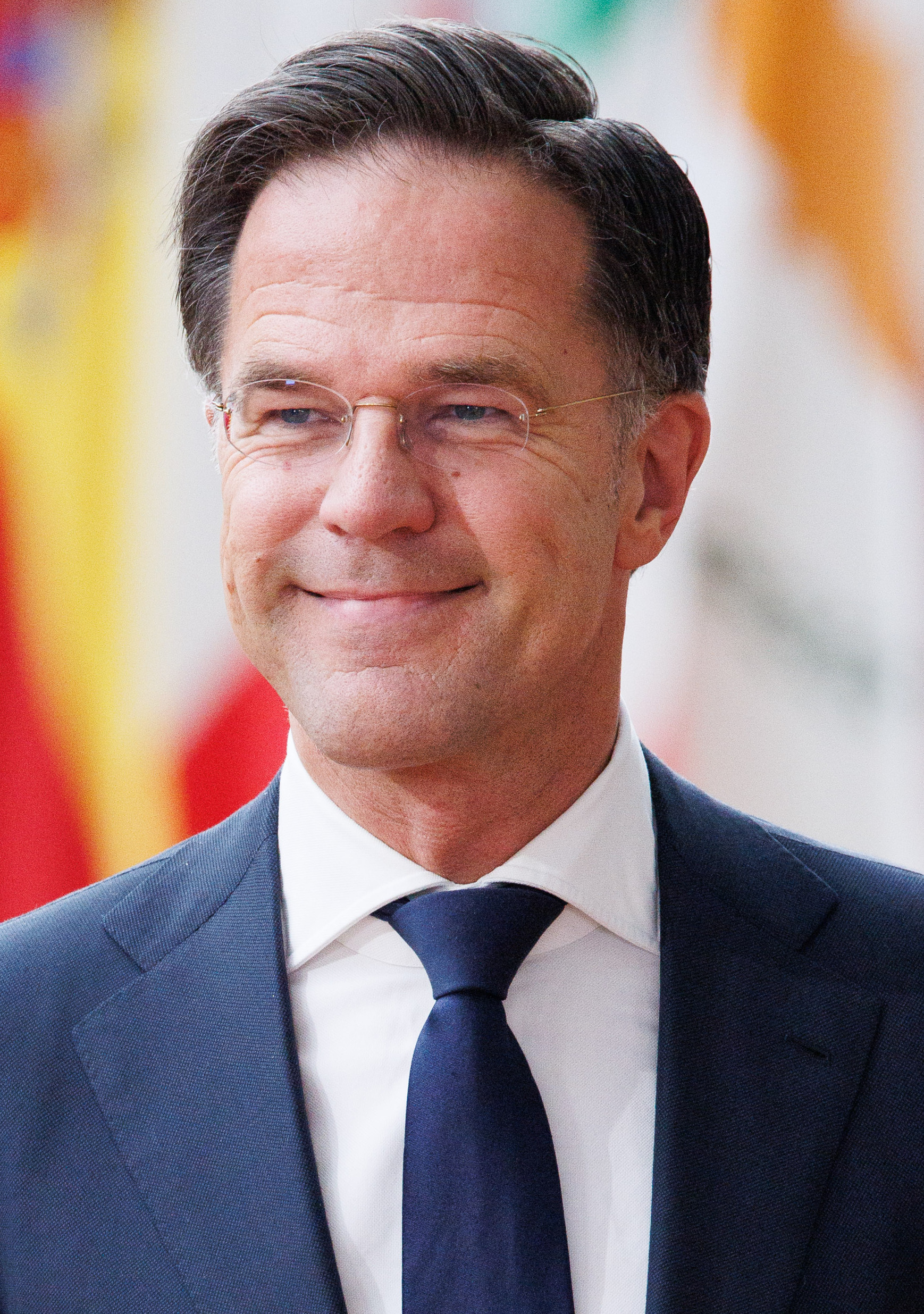
(NATO) NATO
Mark Rutte, Secretary General

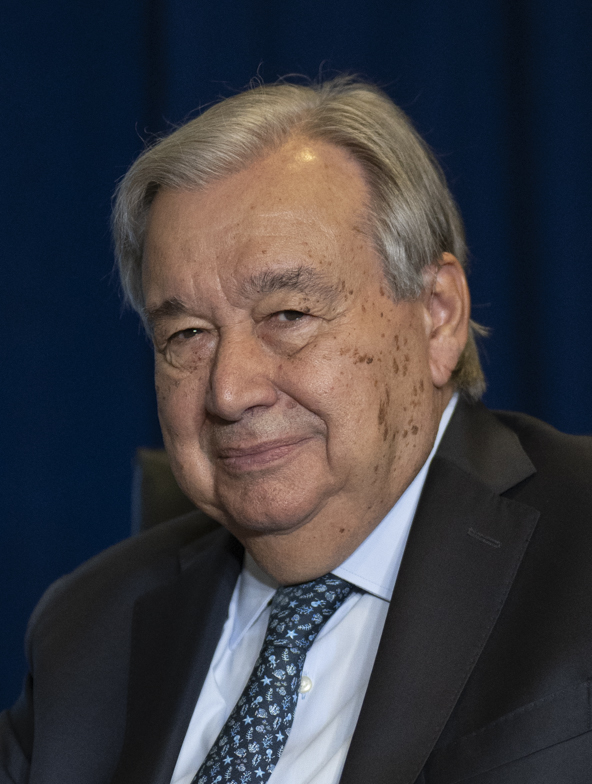
United Nations
António Guterres, Secretary General

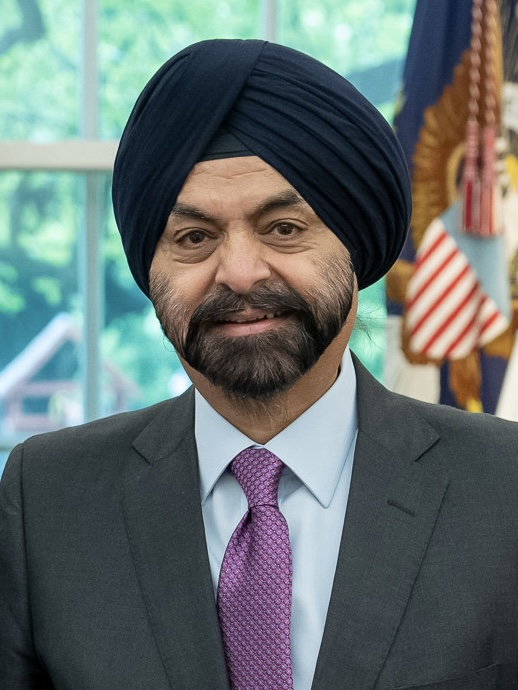
World Bank
Ajay Banga, President

== Event calendar ==
The Canadian Prime Ministerial Office announced the following events:

Date	Event	Venue
12–14 March	Foreign Ministers' Meeting	Charlevoix, Quebec
20–22 May	Finance Ministers and Central Governors' Meeting	Banff, Alberta
15–17 June	Leaders' Summit	Kananaskis Village, Alberta

=== Foreign Ministers' Meeting (12–14 March) ===
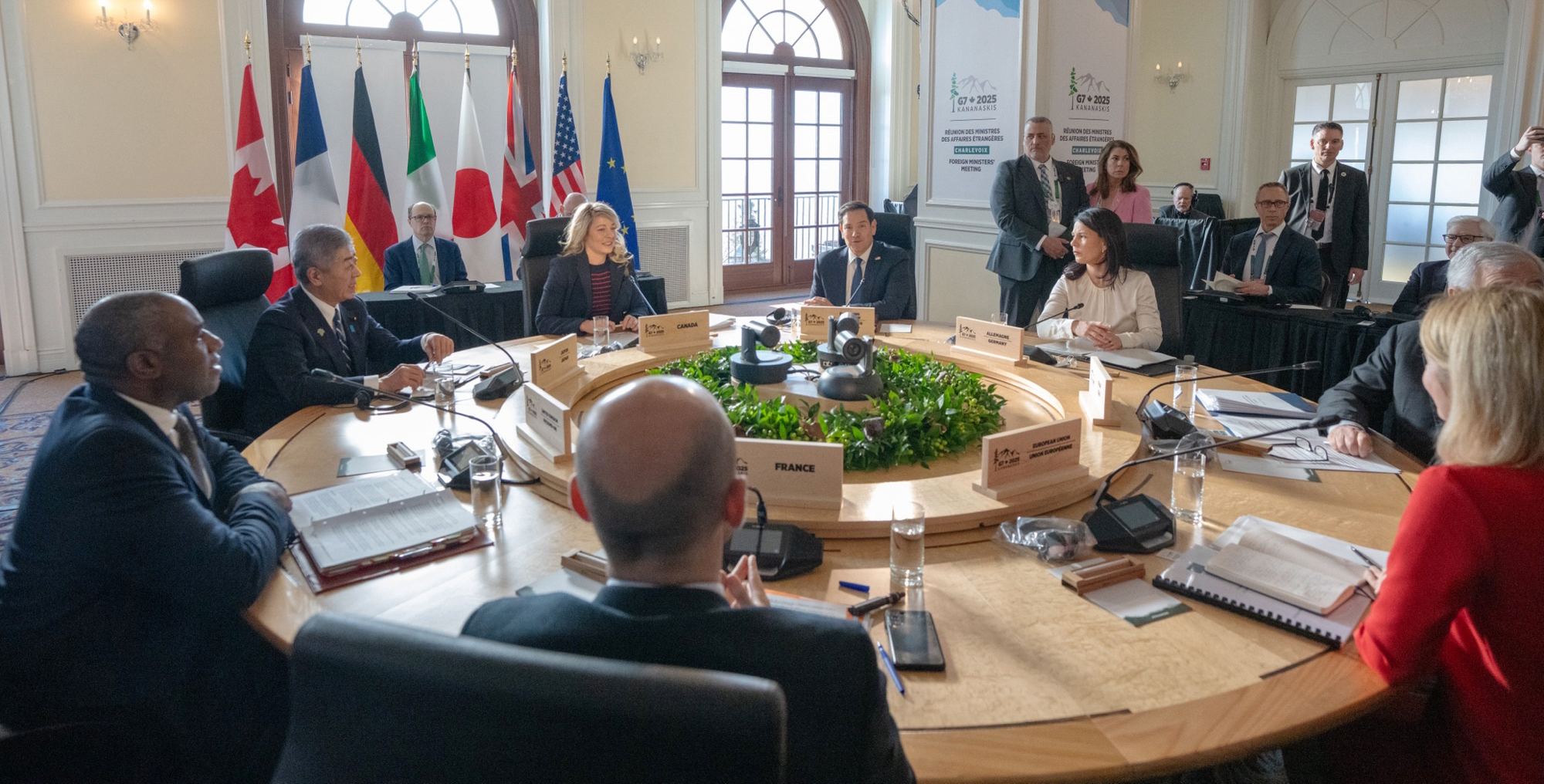
G7 Foreign Ministers meeting in Charlevoix, 13 March 2025

During the G7 Foreign Ministers meeting in Charlevoix on 12–14 March 2025 they made agreements on the following issues:

- Ukraine's long-term prosperity and security
- Regional peace and stability in the Middle East
- Cooperation to increase security and resilience across the Indo-Pacific
- Building stability and resilience in Haiti and Venezuela
- Supporting lasting peace in Sudan and the Democratic Republic of the Congo
- Strengthening sanctions and countering hybrid warfare and sabotage

== Events leading to the summit ==
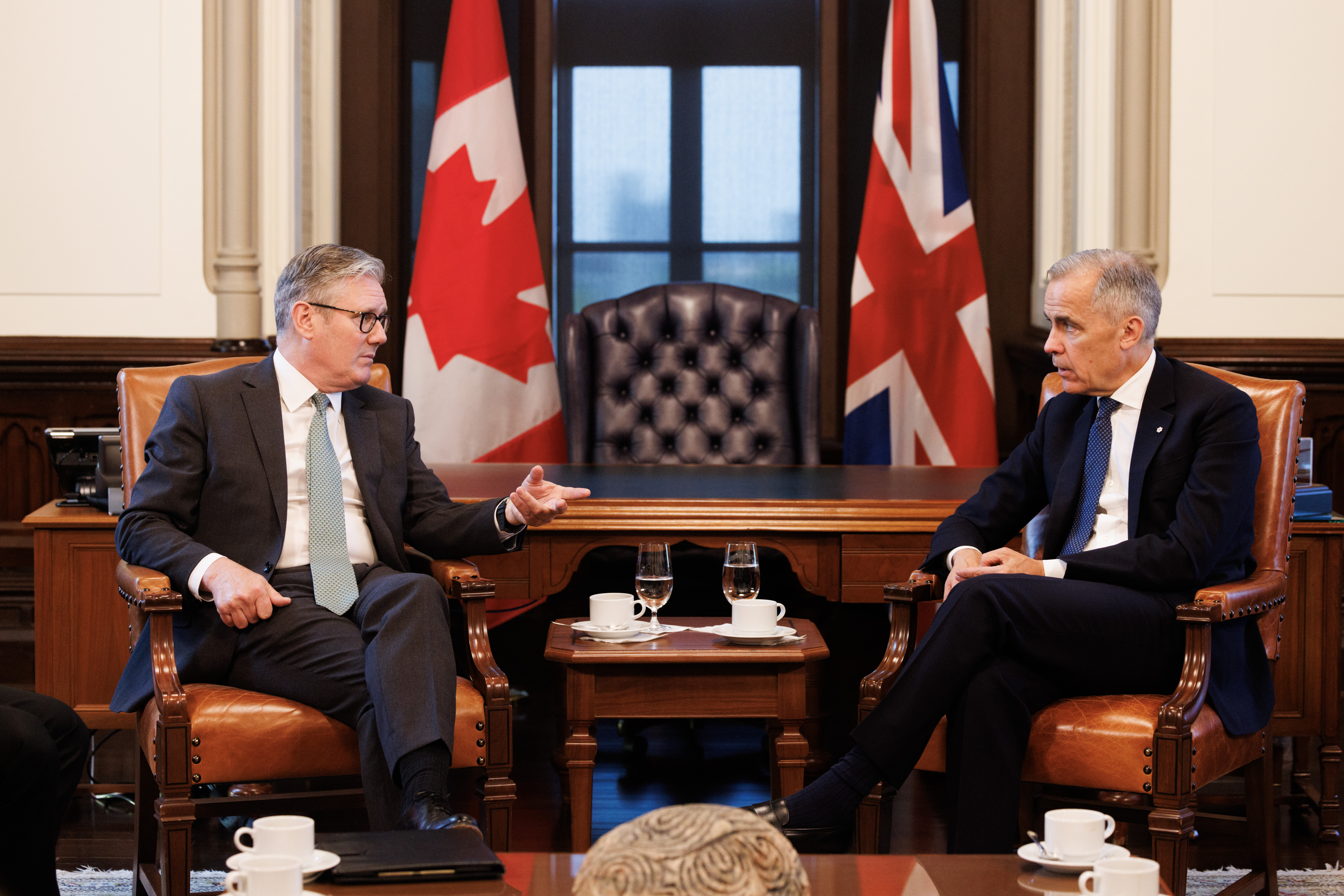
Canadian Prime Minister Mark Carney with British Prime Minister Keir Starmer at Parliament Hill, Ottawa, 15 June 2025

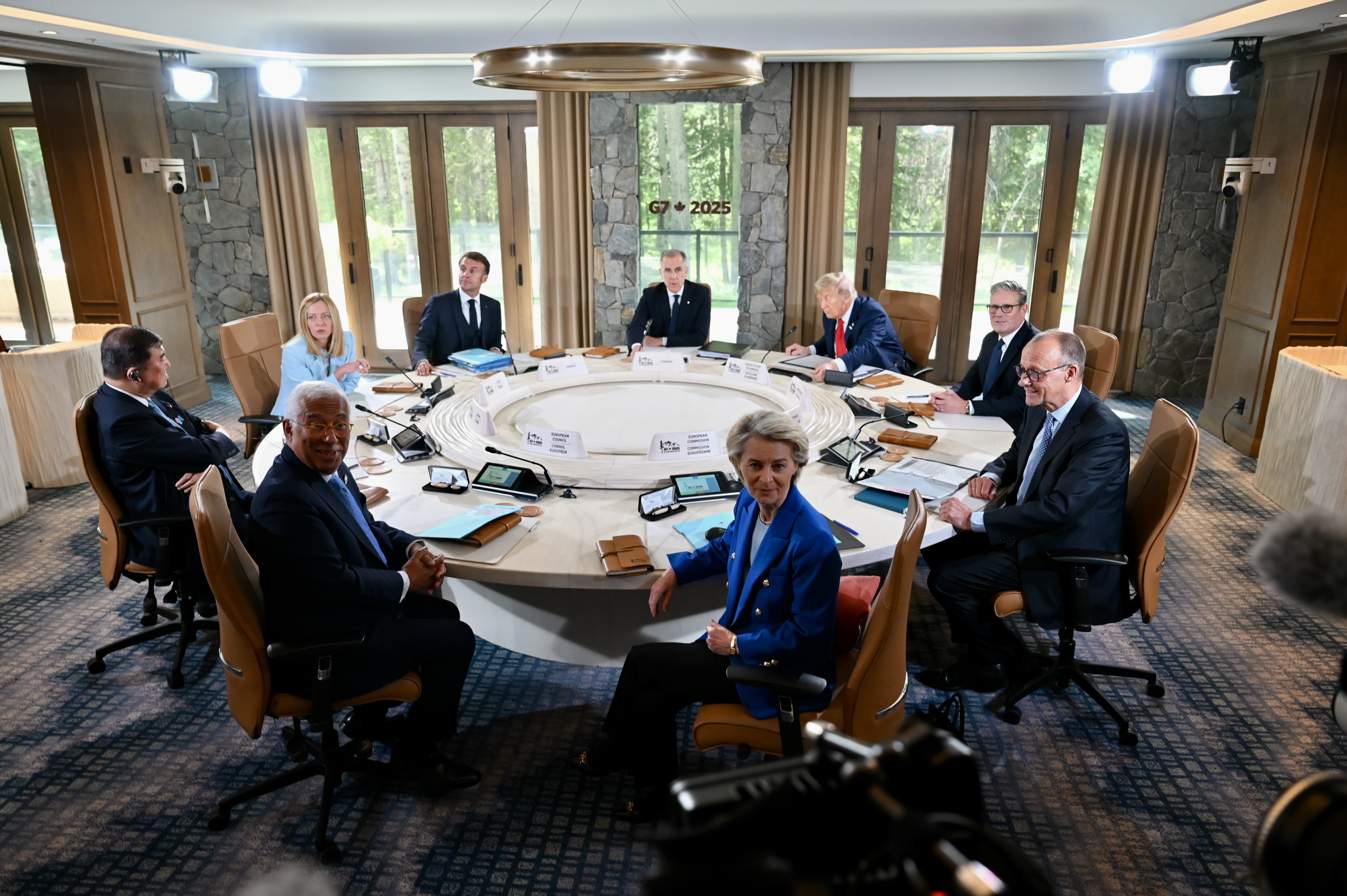
Working session on 16 June 2025

On 14 June, Canadian prime minister Carney and British prime minister Starmer held their bilateral meeting in Ottawa. On route to Ottawa, Starmer stated that "Canada is an independent, sovereign country and a much-valued member of the Commonwealth" in the wake of President Trump's threats to annex Canada as the 51st state. Upon arrival, Starmer had dinner with Canadian prime minister Mark Carney at his official residence at Rideau Cottage, later the two watched a National Hockey League game between the Edmonton Oilers and Florida Panthers. They agreed to establish an Economic and Trade Working Group and to deepen the Trade Continuity Agreement, while Carney committed Canada to ratifying the UK's accession to CPTPP. The meeting was the first between two international leaders since Israel's strikes on Iran starting the 2025 Iran–Israel conflict; Starmer began a diplomatic push to try to de-escalate the Middle Eastern crisis.

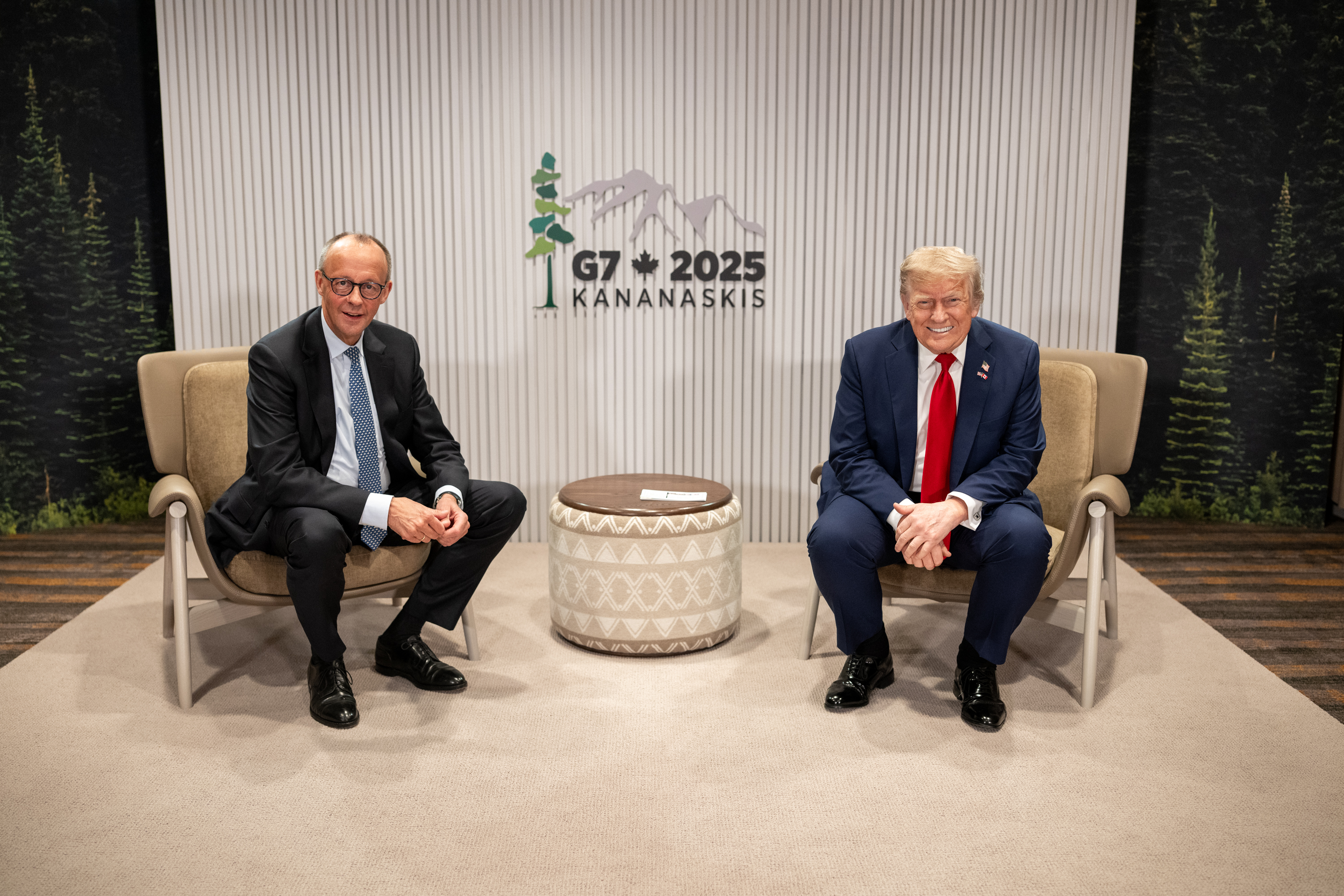
US President Donald Trump with German Chancellor Friedrich Merz, 16 June 2025

== Twelve-Day War ==
Following the outbreak of the Twelve-Day War, Trump stated that he needed to leave to control the United States's response to the conflict, which meant that he sidelined some scheduled meetings with world leaders.

On 16 June 2025, G7 leaders said: "We affirm that Israel has a right to defend itself. We reiterate our support for the security of Israel. Iran is the principal source of regional instability and terror."

== Post summit ==
From 11 to 12 November 2025, the G7 Foreign Ministers' Meeting was held at Niagara-on-the-Lake, and joint statement was issued. The joint statement showed their consensus on Ukraine and Sudan, but stayed away from contentious issues like the US military strikes on boats in the Caribbean and trade. They are increasing the economic costs to Russia and exploring measures against those who finance Russia's war efforts. Also, they raised alarm over China's military buildup and reiterated their resolve to create an alternative to its dominance in critical mineral supplies, and reaffirmed the importance of a Free and Open Indo-Pacific based on the rule of law.

== See also ==
- 2025 G20 Johannesburg summit
- 17th BRICS summit
