= Kananaskis Improvement District =

Improvement district in Alberta, Canada

- Improvement district
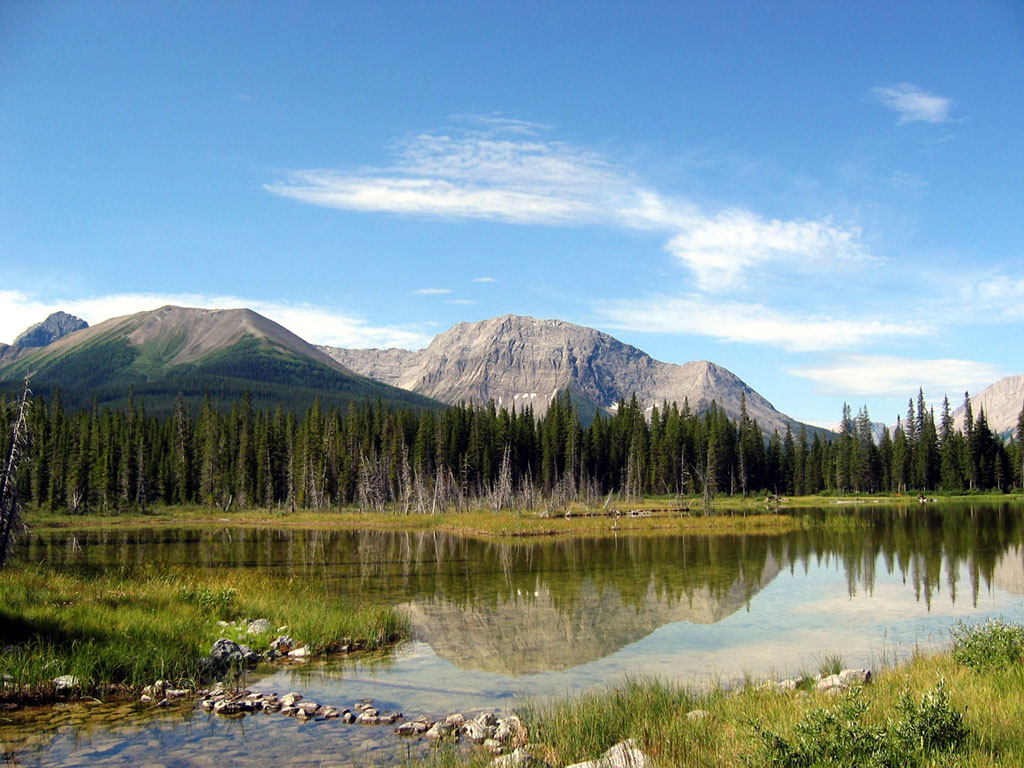
- Kananaskis Country within the improvement district

- Logo

- Location within Alberta
- Coordinates: 50.6°N 114.9°W
- Country: Canada
- Province: Alberta
- Region: Alberta's Rockies
- Census division: No. 15
- Established: January 1, 1983
- Renamed: April 1, 1996

Government
  - Governing body: Kananaskis Council
  - Chair: Erum Afsar
  - Administrative office: Kananaskis Village
  - CAO: Jordie Fraser
  - MLA: Sarah Elmeligi

Area (2021)
  - Land: 4,203.24 km^{2} (1,622.88 sq mi)

Population (2021)
  - Total: 156
  - Density: 0/km^{2} (0/sq mi)
- Time zone: UTC−06:00 (Alberta Time)
- Website: kananaskisid.ca

Kananaskis Improvement District is an improvement district in Alberta, Canada. It is located within Alberta's Rockies, between Calgary and Banff, sharing much of its boundaries with Kananaskis Country.

The administrative centre of the improvement district is Kananaskis Village.

== History ==
The following is the incorporation history of Kananaskis Improvement District.

- April 1, 1945 – Improvement District (I.D.) No. 161, I.D. No. 192, and a portion of I.D. No. 193 amalgamated to form I.D. No. 33
- January 1, 1969 – I.D. No. 33 amalgamated with I.D. No. 27 to form I.D. No. 6, while adjacent I.D. No. 46 and I.D. No. 50 amalgamated to form I.D. No. 8
- January 1, 1983 – portions of I.D. No. 6 and portions of I.D. No. 8 amalgamated to form I.D. No. 5
- April 1, 1996 – the name of I.D. No. 5 changed to Kananaskis Improvement District

== Geography ==
=== Communities and localities ===
There are no communities located within Kananaskis Improvement District.

The following localities are located within Kananaskis Improvement District.

Localities

- Bow Valley Park
- Camp Horizon
- Kananaskis Village
- Kovach
- Mount Kidd RV Park
- Seebe

=== Climate ===
Kananaskis experiences a subarctic climate (Köppen climate classification Dfc).

Climate data for Kananaskis
Month	Jan	Feb	Mar	Apr	May	Jun	Jul	Aug	Sep	Oct	Nov	Dec	Year
Record high °C (°F)	19 (66)	18 (64)	19 (66)	26.1 (79.0)	29.5 (85.1)	31.1 (88.0)	33.9 (93.0)	33.3 (91.9)	31 (88)	27.2 (81.0)	19.5 (67.1)	16.1 (61.0)	33.9 (93.0)
Mean daily maximum °C (°F)	−1.8 (28.8)	0.7 (33.3)	4.2 (39.6)	9.4 (48.9)	14.1 (57.4)	18.2 (64.8)	21.5 (70.7)	21.1 (70.0)	16.5 (61.7)	10.8 (51.4)	2.5 (36.5)	−1.4 (29.5)	9.6 (49.3)
Daily mean °C (°F)	−7.5 (18.5)	−5.1 (22.8)	−1.7 (28.9)	3.1 (37.6)	7.6 (45.7)	11.4 (52.5)	14.1 (57.4)	13.6 (56.5)	9.4 (48.9)	4.8 (40.6)	−2.5 (27.5)	−6.7 (19.9)	3.4 (38.1)
Mean daily minimum °C (°F)	−13.2 (8.2)	−10.9 (12.4)	−7.7 (18.1)	−3.2 (26.2)	1 (34)	4.5 (40.1)	6.6 (43.9)	6.1 (43.0)	2.3 (36.1)	−1.2 (29.8)	−7.6 (18.3)	−11.9 (10.6)	−2.9 (26.8)
Record low °C (°F)	−45.6 (−50.1)	−43.5 (−46.3)	−40.6 (−41.1)	−31.1 (−24.0)	−21.7 (−7.1)	−8.3 (17.1)	−2.5 (27.5)	−4 (25)	−14 (7)	−29 (−20)	−37 (−35)	−42.2 (−44.0)	−45.6 (−50.1)
Average precipitation mm (inches)	28.6 (1.13)	26.6 (1.05)	46.5 (1.83)	52.6 (2.07)	91.6 (3.61)	89.7 (3.53)	68.9 (2.71)	72.7 (2.86)	67.4 (2.65)	36 (1.4)	28.4 (1.12)	29 (1.1)	637.8 (25.11)
Source: Environment Canada

== Demographics ==
In the 2021 Census of Population conducted by Statistics Canada, Kananaskis Improvement District had a population of 156 living in 60 of its 152 total private dwellings, a change of −29.4% from its 2016 population of 221. With a land area of 4,203.24 km^{2} (1,622.88 sq mi), it had a population density of 0.0/km^{2} (0.1/sq mi) in 2021.

In the 2016 Census of Population conducted by Statistics Canada, the Kananaskis Improvement District had a population of 221 living in 58 of its 79 total private dwellings, a change of −11.2% from its 2011 population of 249. With a land area of 4,213.95 km^{2} (1,627.02 sq mi), it had a population density of 0.1/km^{2} (0.1/sq mi) in 2016.

== Government ==
Like all improvement districts in Alberta, Kananaskis Improvement District is administered by Alberta Municipal Affairs. However, residents do elect an advisory council consisting of a chairperson and three councillors to oversee the activities of municipal staff.

== G7/G8 summits ==
The 28th G8 summit was held in the area June 2002, hosted by Jean Chrétien. Held at the Kananaskis Resort (also called the "Delta Lodge at Kananaskis") in Kananaskis Village, this was the second time Canada used a lodge venue for a G8 summit, after its inaugural 7th G7 summit in Montebello, Quebec in 1981. It is estimated the 2002 conference contributed around $300 million into the Kananaskis and Alberta economies while security cost taxpayers in excess of $200 million.

The 51st G7 summit was held in the area in June 2025, hosted by Mark Carney.

The two summits are the only G7/G8 summits to be held in Western Canada.

== See also ==
- List of communities in Alberta
