= Mount Kidd =

Mountain in Alberta, Canada

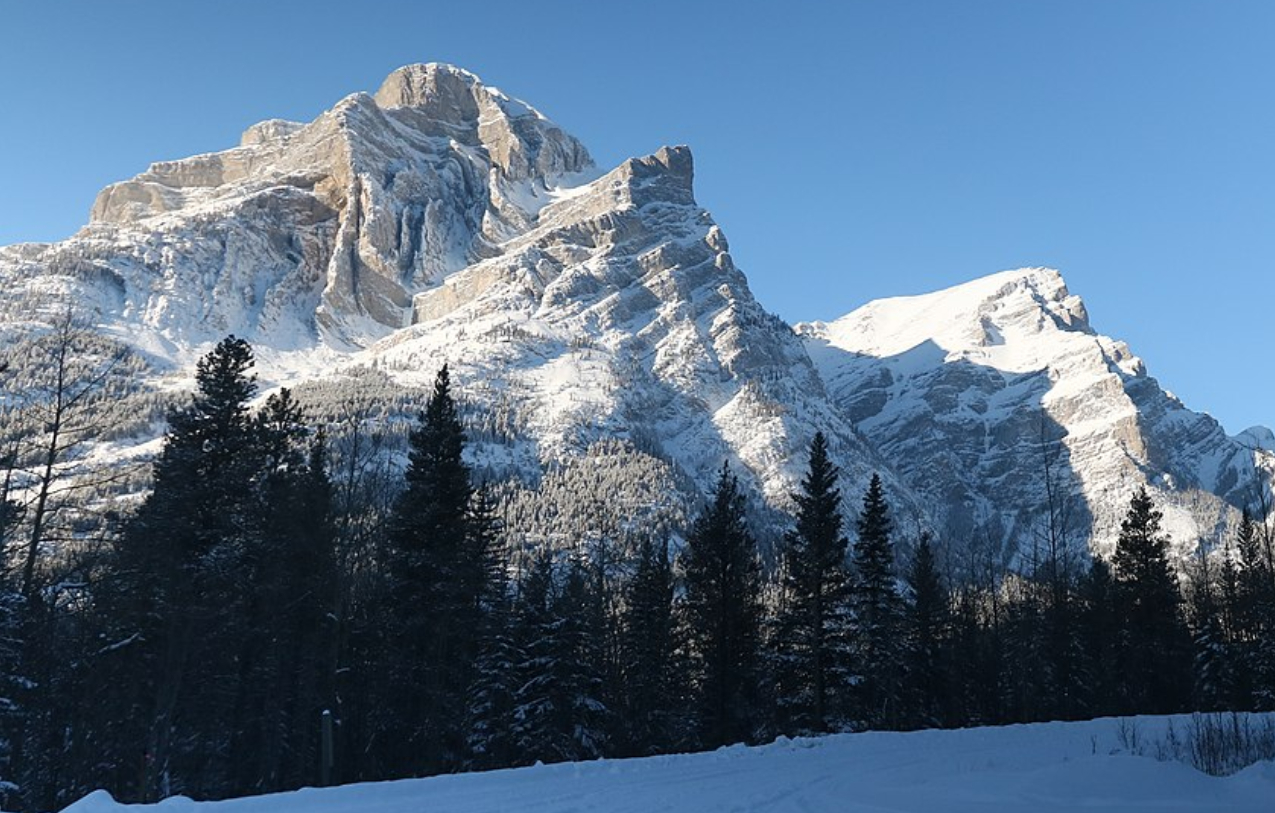
- Mount Kidd seen from northbound Highway 40 with south peak on left and north peak on right

Highest point
- Elevation: 2,958 m (9,705 ft)
- Prominence: 535 m (1,755 ft)
- Parent peak: The Tower (3117 m)
- Isolation: 3.84 km (2.39 mi)
- Listing: Mountains of Alberta
- Coordinates: 50°53′37″N 115°11′23″W

Naming
- Etymology: John Alfred (Fred) Kidd

Geography
- Location within Kananaskis Improvement District Location within Alberta
- Interactive map of Mount Kidd
- Country: Canada
- Province: Alberta
- Protected area: Spray Valley Provincial Park
- Parent range: Kananaskis Range; Canadian Rockies
- Topo map: NTS 82J14 Spray Lakes Reservoir

Geology
- Rock age: Cambrian
- Rock type: sedimentary rock

Climbing
- First ascent: 1947 by R. C. Hind and J.F. Tarrant
- Easiest route: Scramble

Mount Kidd is a 2,958-metre (9,705-foot) double-summit massif centrally located in Kananaskis Country in the Canadian Rockies of Alberta, Canada. Mount Kidd is situated within Spray Valley Provincial Park, and its nearest higher neighbor is Mount Sparrowhawk, 7.0 km (4.3 mi) to the northwest. Mount Kidd is a landmark that can be seen from Highway 40 in the Kananaskis Village area, and from the Kananaskis Country Golf Course which lies at the eastern base of the mountain.

== History ==
In 1907, Dr. Donaldson Bogart Dowling, an engineer with the Geological Survey of Canada, named the mountain for Stuart Kidd, who was a resident of nearby Morley, Alberta. From 1902 to 1907, Kidd ran the Morley general store and outfitted expeditions and geological survey crews such as Dowling's with supplies. The first ascent of the mountain was made in 1947 by R. C. Hind and J. F. Tarrant. The mountain's name was officially adopted in 1953 by the Geographical Names Board of Canada. In June 1986, Mount Kidd was the scene of the first of three related airplane crashes known as the Rescue 807 Crashes. In August 2010, James Hoshizaki stepped onto a snow cornice to pose for a photo when it gave way, resulting in an avalanche that swept him down about 200 metres to his death.

== Geology ==
Mount Kidd is composed of sedimentary rock laid down during the Precambrian to Jurassic periods. Formed in shallow seas, this sedimentary rock was pushed east and over the top of younger rock during the Laramide orogeny. The Lewis Overthrust extends over 450 km (280 mi) from Mount Kidd south to Steamboat Mountain, located west of Great Falls, Montana. Mount Kidd marks the northern end of the Lewis Thrust Fault.

== Climate ==
Based on the Köppen climate classification, Mount Kidd is located in a subarctic climate zone with cold snowy winters and mild summers. Temperatures can drop below −20 °C (−4 °F) with wind chill factors below −30 °C (−22 °F). Weather conditions during winter make Mount Kidd one of the better places in the Rockies for ice climbing. Precipitation runoff from the mountain drains into the Kananaskis River which is a tributary of the Bow River, and thence the Saskatchewan River.

== Climbing ==
Mount Kidd has two summits, a north and south peak, each with scramble routes. The more massive north peak is the true summit at 2,958 m (9,705 ft), whereas the lesser south peak rises to 2,895 m (9,498 ft). Additionally, Mount Kidd has a class 5.7 rock climbing route on its northeast buttress, as well a 5.8 route called The Fold on the south peak. In 1985, Rudi Kranabitter and Ferdl Taxbock made the first ascent of this now-classic route.

Ice Climbing Routes with grades on Mount Kidd:

- A Bridge Too Far – WI4+
- Kidd Falls – WI4
- Tasting Fear – WI5−
- Wedge Smear – WI3
- Sinatra Falls – WI2

== Gallery ==
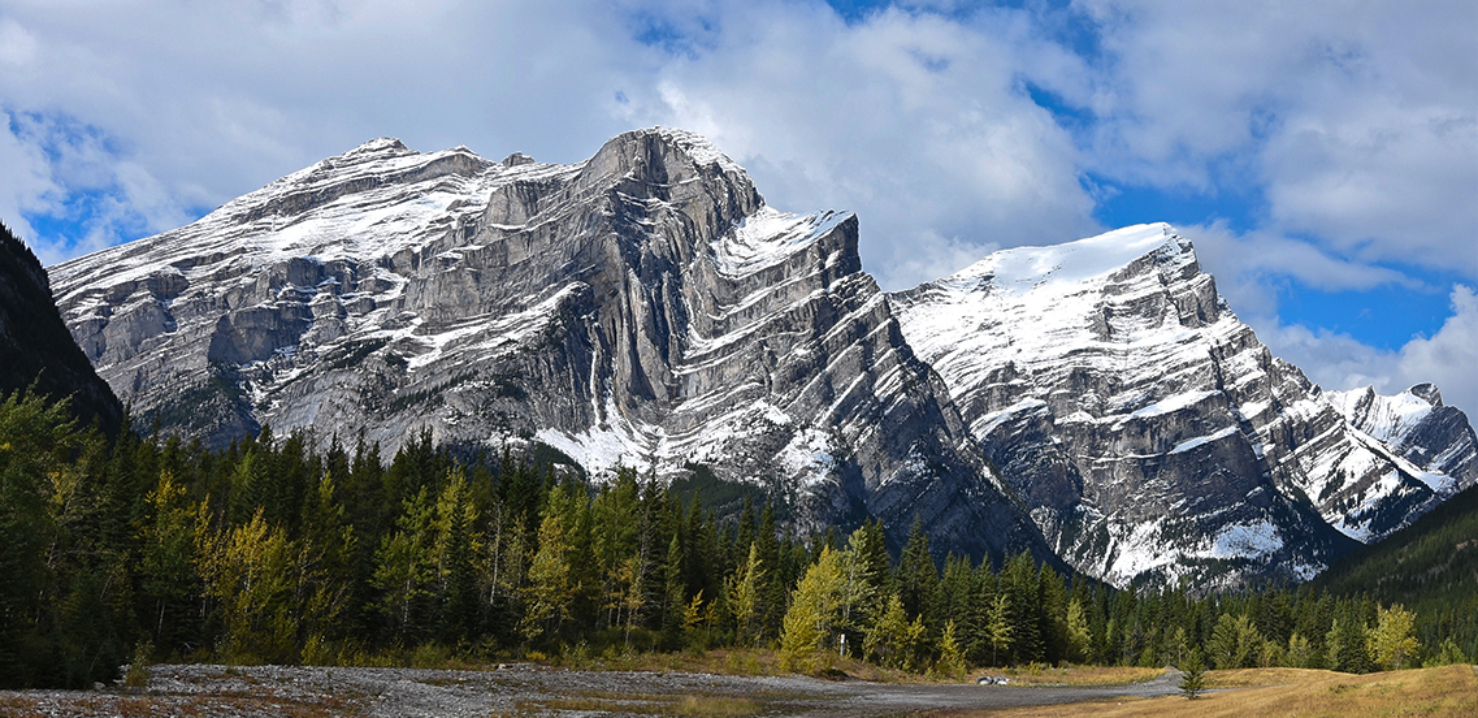
Mount Kidd seen from northbound Highway 40. Note the geologic fold in the mountain

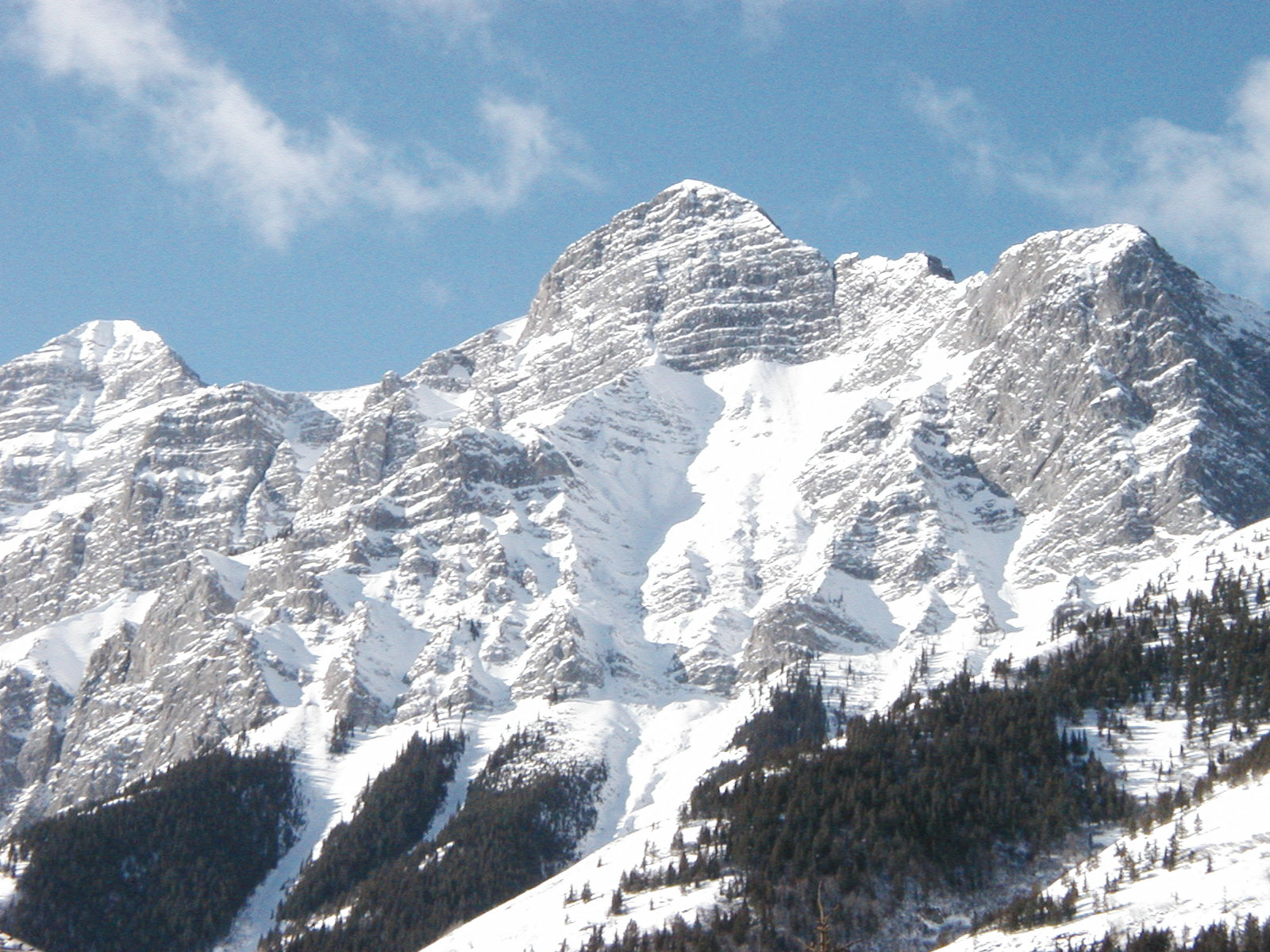
View of Mount Kidd from Kananaskis Village

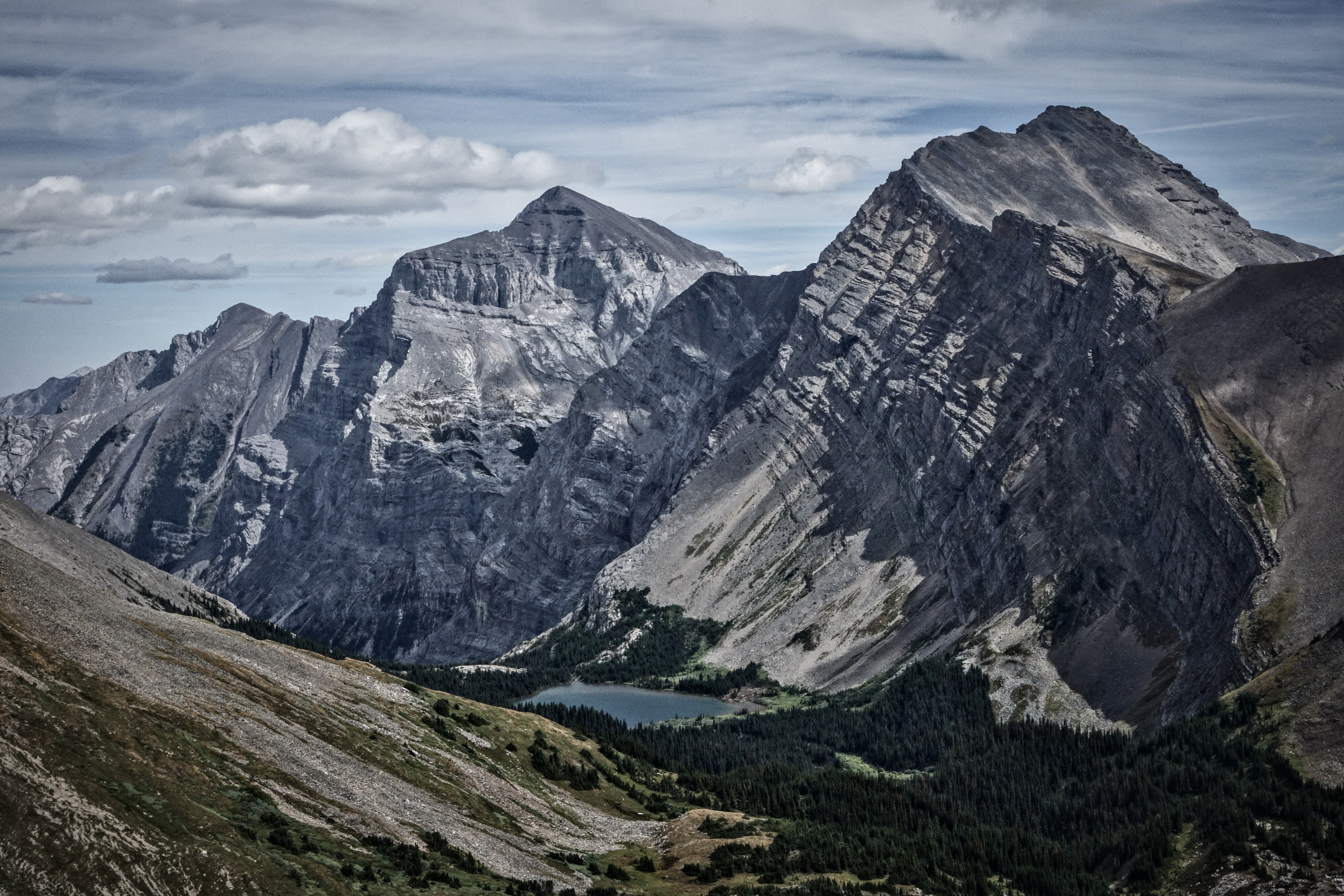
Mt. Kidd centered, South Kidd (right), and Ribbon Lake.

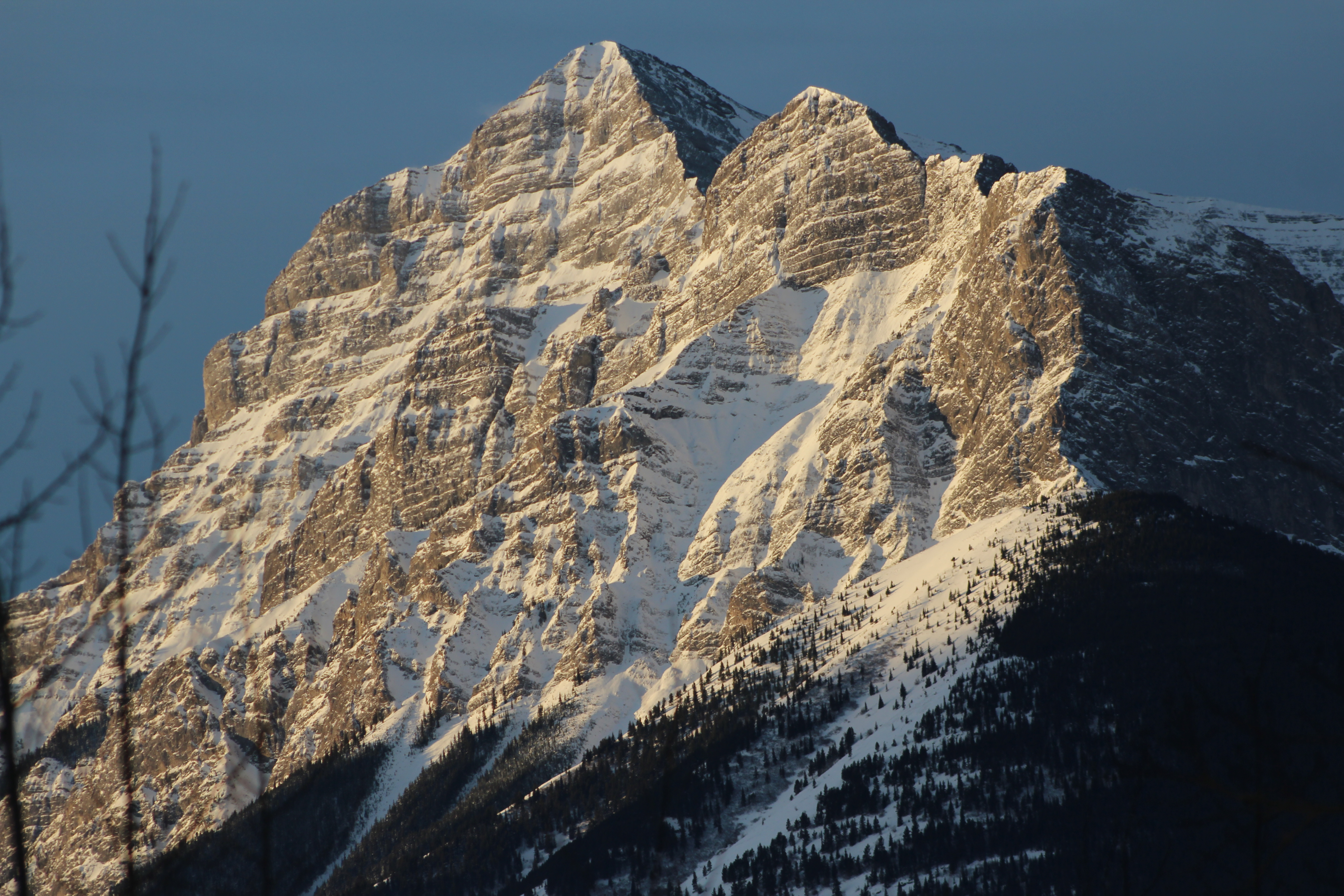
Mount Kidd close-up of East Face

== See also ==
- Scrambles in the Canadian Rockies
- List of mountains of Canada
- Geography of Alberta
