= Kananaskis Village =

Unincorporated community in Alberta, Canada

Kananaskis Village nēhiyawēwin
- Locality
- Location in Alberta Location in Canada
- Coordinates: 50°54′56″N 115°8′30″W
- Country: Canada
- Province: Alberta
- Improvement district: Kananaskis Improvement District
- Time zone: UTC−7 (Mountain)
  - Summer (DST): UTC−6 (MDT)
- Area codes: 403, 587, 825
- Highways: 40

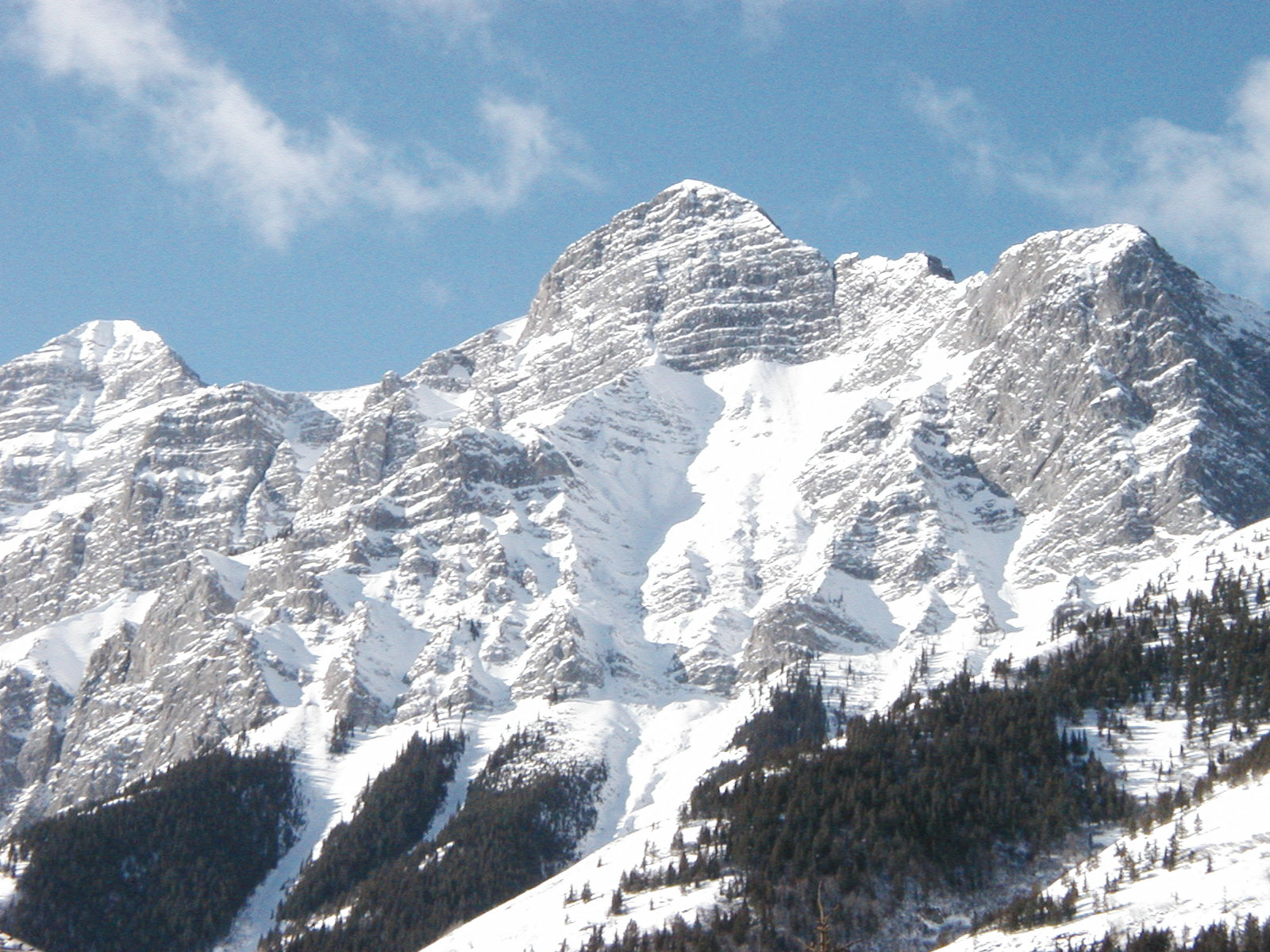
Mountain view from Kananaskis Village

Kananaskis Village is an unincorporated community in Alberta's Rockies within the Kananaskis Country park system in the Kananaskis Improvement District of Alberta, Canada. It is located between Calgary and Banff, approximately 26 km (16 mi) south of the Trans-Canada Highway (Highway 1), 3 km (1.9 mi) west of Highway 40 (Kananaskis Trail) via Mt. Allan Drive and Centennial Drive. The community is located on the west shore of the Kananaskis River at the base of Mount Kidd.

The village was the host of the 28th G8 summit in 2002 and the 51st G7 summit in 2025.

Kananaskis Improvement District's municipal office is located in Kananaskis Village.

== Attractions ==
Kananaskis Village is a resort community. It features hotel-style accommodation and numerous amenities. Amenities include a 36-hole golf course (Kananaskis Country Golf Course), downhill skiing (Nakiska Ski Area), equestrian facilities (Boundary Ranch), and trails for hiking, mountain cycling, and cross-country skiing.

== See also ==
- List of communities in Alberta
