= Alberta Highway 9 =

Highway in Alberta, Canada

Highway 9

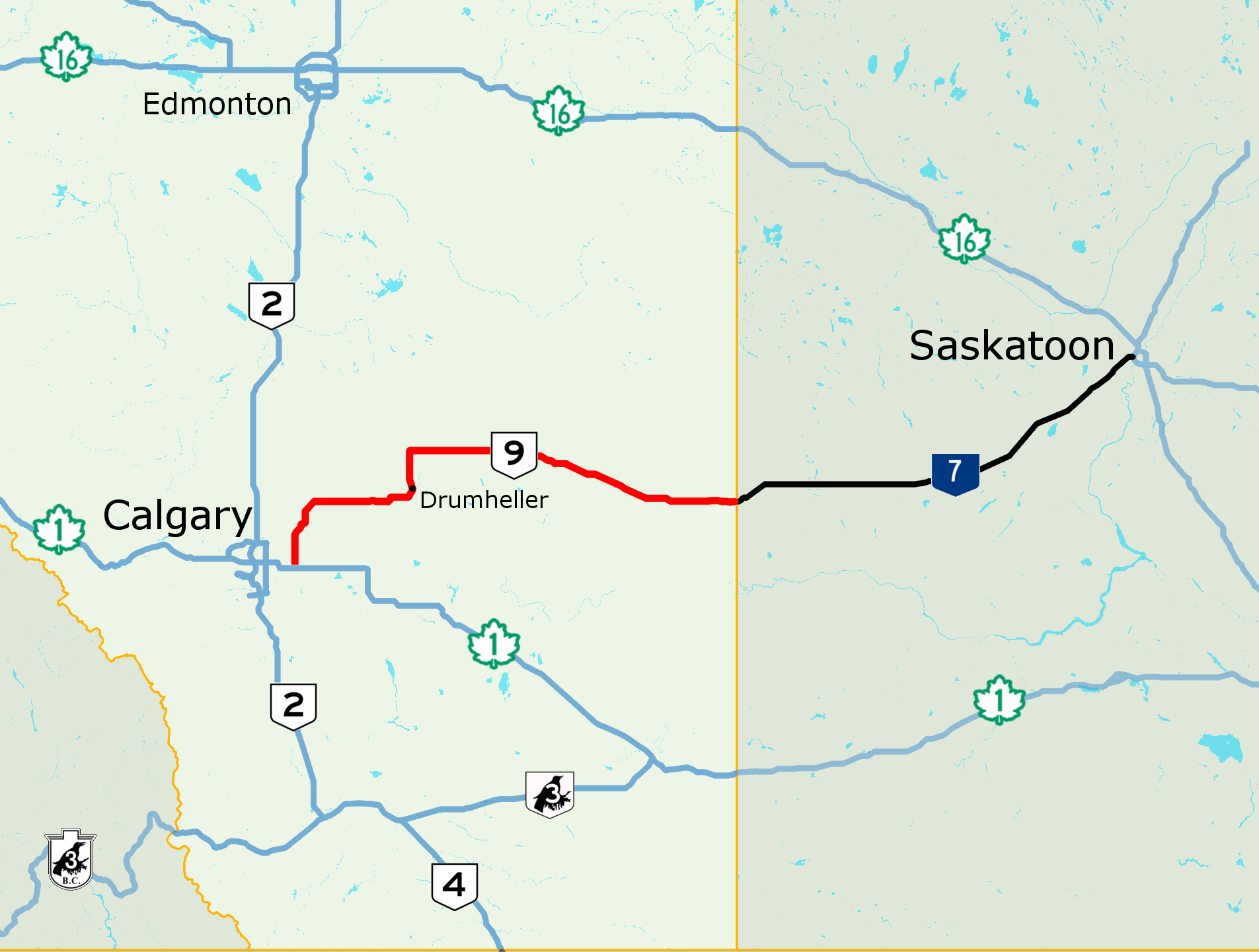
- Alberta Highway 9 (highlighted in red) and Saskatchewan Highway 7 form a core route of the National Highway System between Calgary and Saskatoon

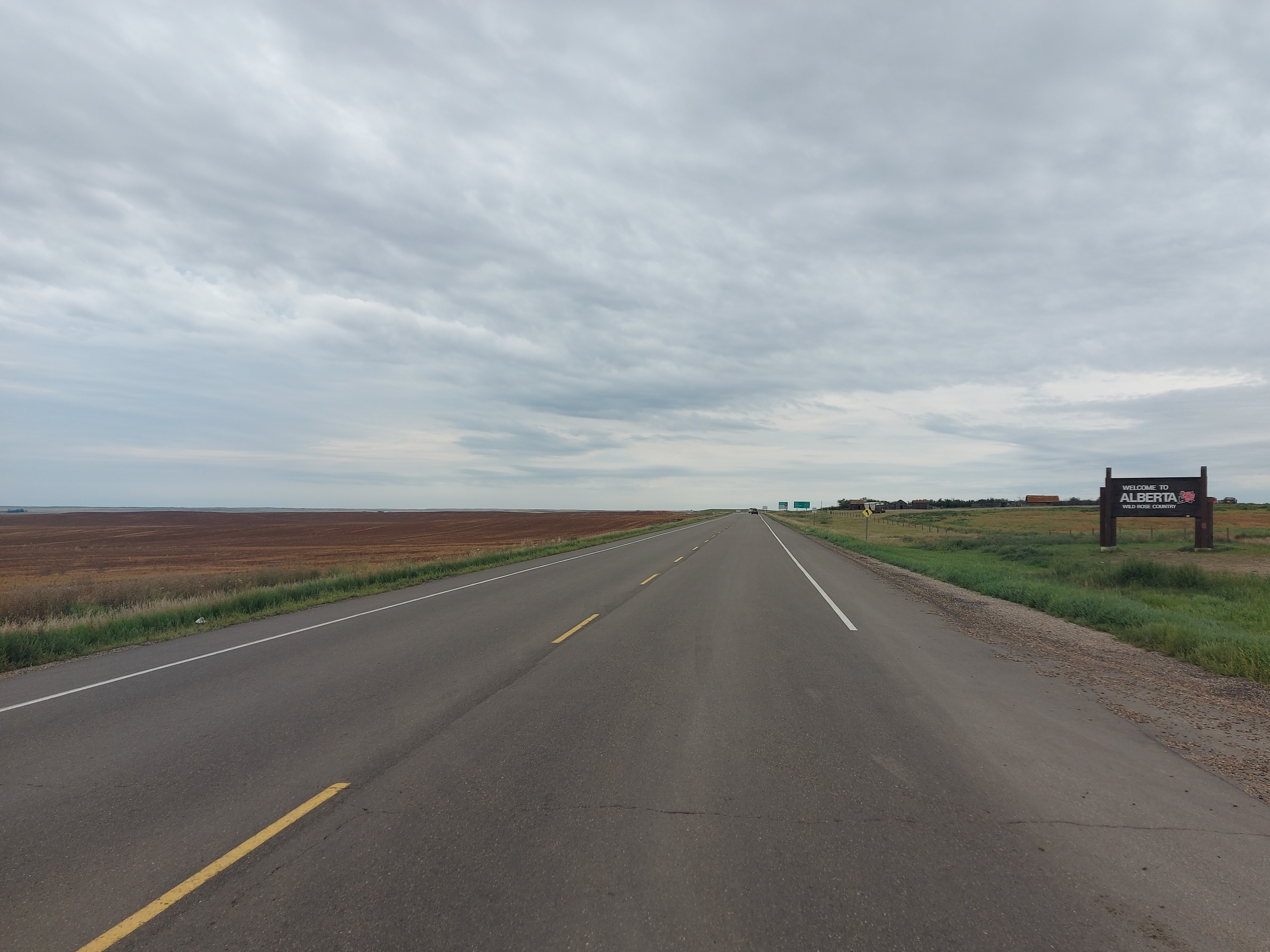
- The eastern terminus of Hwy 9, facing west

Route information
- Maintained by the Ministry of Transportation and Economic Corridors
- Length: 324.1 km (201.4 mi)

Major junctions
- West end: Highway 1 (TCH) / Highway 797 near Langdon
- Highway 72 in Beiseker; Highway 21 near Beiseker; Highway 10 / Highway 56 in Drumheller; Highway 27 / Highway 56 near Morrin; Highway 36 near Hanna; Highway 41 near Oyen
- East end: Highway 7 at Saskatchewan border near Alsask

Location
- Country: Canada
- Province: Alberta
- Specialized and rural municipalities: Rocky View County, Wheatland County, Kneehill County, Starland County, Special Area No. 2, Special Area No. 3
- Towns: Irricana, Drumheller, Hanna
- Villages: Beiseker, Munson, Youngstown, Cereal

Highway system
- Alberta Numbered Highway Network; List; Former
← Highway 8	→ Highway 10

Highway 9 is a highway in south-central Alberta, Canada, which together with Saskatchewan Highway 7 connects Calgary with Saskatoon, Saskatchewan via Drumheller. It is designated as a core route of the National Highway System, forming a portion of an interprovincial corridor. Highway 9 spans approximately 324 kilometres (201 mi) from the Trans-Canada Highway (Highway 1) east of Calgary to Alberta's border with Saskatchewan.

== Route description ==
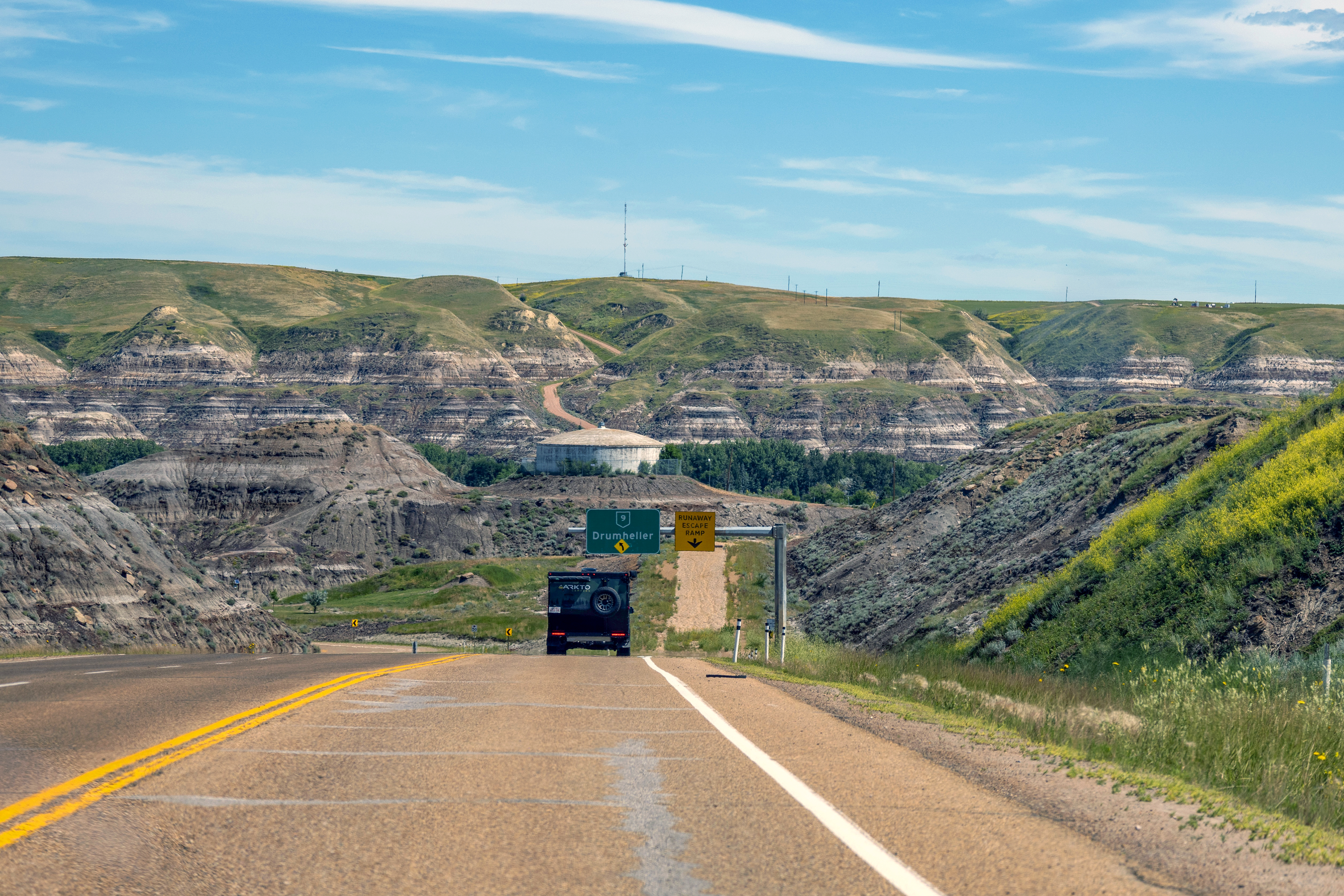
Highway 9 descending into the Red Deer River valley in Drumheller

Highway 9 begins at its interchange with Highway 1 approximately 10 km (6 mi) east of Chestermere and 20 km (12 mi) west of Strathmore, and approximately 6 km (4 mi) north of Langdon via Highway 797. For its first 45 km (28 mi), Highway 9 generally runs in a north/south direction to Beiseker, where it meets Highways 72 and 806. At Beiseker, Highway 9 runs in an east-west direction for 64 km (40 mi) to Drumheller, where it meets Highways 10 and 56. Highways 9 and 56 then run in a north/south concurrence for 22 km (14 mi) from Drumheller to its intersection with Highway 27 east of Morrin. Highway 9 leaves the concurrence at this point and runs east/west for the balance of route to the Saskatchewan border, providing connections to Hanna and Oyen as well as numerous smaller communities, and generally running parallel to Highway 12 to the north. The highway continues as Saskatchewan's Highway 7 in a northeast direction toward Saskatoon.

Drumheller, situated on the Red Deer River approximately 138 km (86 mi) northeast of Calgary, is the principal community along the route. The town lies within the Alberta Badlands, where the Red Deer River has cut deeply into the prairie to expose sedimentary rock formations internationally recognised for the abundance of dinosaur and other fossils they contain; the Royal Tyrrell Museum of Palaeontology, located 6 km (3.7 mi) northwest of Drumheller on Highway 838, houses the largest display of complete dinosaur skeletons in the world. Highway 9 descends from the surrounding prairie into the Red Deer River valley at Drumheller, crossing the river at km 108.3 before climbing back onto the open plains to the east. East of Drumheller the highway traverses Starland County and the Special Areas, a series of provincially administered rural districts established in the 1930s to manage land in the former dry-belt settlement zone, where drought and crop failure had depopulated much of the area during the preceding decades.

== History ==
Over the past few years, the province of Alberta has executed a number of upgrades to the highway, widening shoulders and realigning the road (most recently just west of Drumheller, although the new alignment now bypasses the Horseshoe Canyon landmark as a result). As of 2007, however, the province has yet to twin any stretch of the busy highway, and there have been calls for interchanges to be built at its junctions with Highway 21 and the Trans-Canada due to the number of fatal automobile accidents that have happened at these locations.

A partial cloverleaf interchange was constructed in 2007 where Highway 9 crosses the Trans-Canada Highway. As well, the junction with Highway 21 was changed to a four-way stop in early 2011.

== Major intersections ==
The following is a list of major intersections along Alberta Highway 9 from west to east.

Rural/specialized municipality	Location	km	mi	Destinations	Notes
Foothills County		−22.6	−14.0	Highway 552 – De Winton	Highway 797 southern terminus; unsigned
Foothills County		−19.7	−12.2	dead end	Highway 797 northern terminus
Gap in Highway 797 / Range Road 273 (Bow River)
Rocky View County		−16.2	−10.1	Township Road 220	
Rocky View County		−8.1	−5.0	Highway 22X – Calgary, Gleichen	
Rocky View County	Langdon	−6.5	−4.0	Highway 560 west (Glenmore Trail) / Township Road 234 – Calgary	Highway 797 southern terminus
Rocky View County		0.0	0.0	Highway 1 (TCH) – Strathmore, Medicine Hat, Calgary	Interchange
Rocky View County		0.0	0.0	Highway 9 western terminus • Highway 797 northern terminus	
Rocky View County		13.0	8.1	Highway 564 – Delacour, Calgary	
Rocky View County		19.4	12.1	Highway 566 west – Balzac, Kathyrn, Keoma	
Rocky View County		32.7	20.3	Highway 567 west – Airdrie	
Rocky View County	Irricana	35.1	21.8	UAR 144 west	
Rocky View County	Beiseker	43.2	26.8	UAR 141 west	
Rocky View County	Beiseker	44.3	27.5	Highway 72 west – Crossfield Highway 806 north – Acme, Linden	Highway 9 branches east; former Highway 21A / Highway 26 north
Wheatland County / Kneehill County		63.8	39.6	Highway 21 – Three Hills, Strathmore	
Wheatland County / Kneehill County		70.3	43.7	Highway 836 north – Carbon	Former Highway 26 north
Wheatland County / Kneehill County		82.7	51.4	Highway 840 south – Rosebud, Standard	
Kneehill County		98.6	61.3	Highway 841 south – Dalum	
Drumheller		106.8	66.4	Highway 10 east / Highway 56 south (Railway Avenue S) / 5 Street SE – Rosedale	West end of Highway 56 concurrency
Drumheller		107.7	66.9	Highway 575 west (South Dinosaur Trail) / 2 Street SW – Nacmine	
Drumheller		108.3	67.3	Crosses the Red Deer River	
Drumheller		108.8	67.6	Highway 838 west (North Dinosaur Trail) – Royal Tyrrell Museum	
Drumheller		109.1	67.8	Highway 576 east	
Starland County	Munson	119.4	74.2	Township Road 302	
Starland County		129.0	80.2	Highway 27 west – Morrin, Three Hills Highway 56 north – Stettler	East end of Highway 56 concurrency
Starland County		142.0	88.2	Highway 849 south – Michichi	
Starland County		151.8	94.3	Highway 851 – Byemoor, Delia	
Starland County		161.5	100.4	UAR 122 north – Craigmyle	
Special Area No. 2		172.9	107.4	Highway 855 north – Watts, Endiang	
Special Area No. 2		174.6	108.5	Highway 862 south – Gem	
Special Area No. 2	Hanna	183.1	113.8	Palliser Trail (Range Road 144)	
Special Area No. 2		189.8	117.9	Highway 36 north – Castor, Viking	West end of Highway 36 concurrency
Special Area No. 2		192.4	119.6	Highway 36 south – Brooks, Taber	East end of Highway 36 concurrency
Special Area No. 3	Youngstown	237.0	147.3	Highway 884 south – Big Stone	West end of Highway 884 concurrency
Special Area No. 3		244.0	151.6	Highway 884 north – Veteran	West end of Highway 884 concurrency
Special Area No. 3	Cereal	267.5	166.2	Highway 886 – Sedalia, Consort, Buffalo	
Special Area No. 3	Oyen	291.1	180.9	Highway 41 – Consort, Oyen, Medicine Hat	
Special Area No. 3		309.2	192.1	Highway 899 north – Esther	West end Highway 899 concurrency
Special Area No. 3		310.9	193.2	Highway 899 south	East end of Highway 899 concurrency
Special Area No. 3		324.1	201.4	Highway 7 east – Alsask, Kindersley, Saskatoon	Continues into Saskatchewan
1.000 mi = 1.609 km; 1.000 km = 0.621 mi: Closed/former; Concurrency terminus; Route transition

== Highway 797 ==
Highway 797
- Location: Foothills County, Rocky View County
- Length: 9.4 km (5.8 mi)

Highway 797 is a highway in the Calgary Region that functions as a southern extension of Highway 9. It presently is in two segments; the 6.5 km (4.0 mi) northern segment runs from Highway 560 (Glenmore Trail) in Langdon to the Trans-Canada Highway, while the 2.9 km (1.8 mi) southern section is unsigned and runs from Highway 552 to the south bank of the Bow River. The northern segment used to extend from Langdon to the north bank of the Bow River, indicating that a bridge might be constructed to connect the two sections. The bridge was not constructed and the 9.7 km (6.0 mi) section was transferred to Rocky View County in the 2000s.
