= Alberta Highway 27 =

Highway in Alberta, Canada

Highway 27

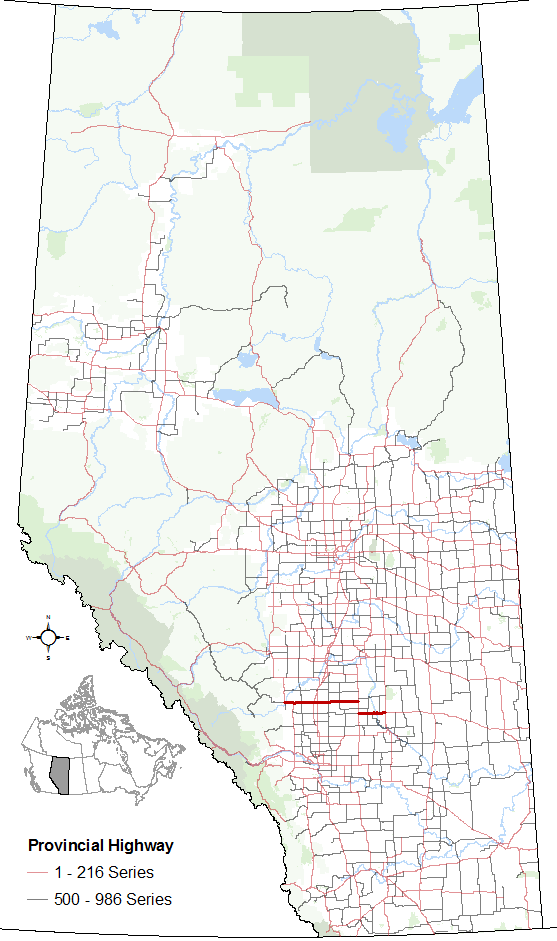

Route information
- Maintained by the Ministry of Transportation and Economic Corridors
- Length: 151 km (94 mi)

Major junctions
- West end: Highway 22 / Highway 584 in Sundre
- Highway 2A in Olds; Highway 2 near Olds; Highway 21 near Three Hills
- East end: Highway 9 / Highway 56 near Morrin

Location
- Country: Canada
- Province: Alberta
- Specialized and rural municipalities: Mountain View County, Kneehill County, Starland County
- Towns: Sundre, Olds, Three Hills
- Villages: Morrin

Highway system
- Alberta Numbered Highway Network; List; Former
← Highway 26	→ Highway 28

Alberta Provincial Highway No. 27, commonly referred to as Highway 27, is a 151-kilometre (94 mi) east-west highway in central Alberta, Canada. It extends from Highway 22 in Sundre, through Olds along 46 Street, and intersects Highway 2 6 km (3.7 mi) east of Olds. It continues east where it intersects Highway 21 4 km (2.5 mi) south of Trochu where it branches south, passes Three Hills, and branches east 10 km (6.2 mi) to the south. The highway ends at intersection of Highways 9 and 56, 5 km (3.1 mi) east of Morrin and 21 km (13 mi) north of Drumheller.

== Major intersections ==
From west to east:

Rural/specialized municipality	Location	km	mi	Destinations	Notes
Sundre		0.0	0.0	Highway 584 west – Bearberry Highway 22 north – Caroline, Rocky Mountain House	Highway 27 western terminus; west end of Highway 22 concurrency; continues as Highway 584
Sundre		2.0	1.2	Crosses the Red Deer River	
Sundre		2.3	1.4	Highway 760 south – Bergen	
Mountain View County	Westward Ho	10.7	6.6	Crosses the Little Red Deer River	
Mountain View County		12.4	7.7	Highway 22 south – Cochrane	East end of Highway 22 concurrency
Mountain View County		23.2	14.4	Highway 766	
Olds		39.5	24.5	Highway 2A (46 Avenue) – Bowden, Didsbury	
Mountain View County		44.4	27.6	Highway 2 – Edmonton, Red Deer, Calgary	Interchange; Highway 2 exit 340 on
Mountain View County		59.4	36.9	Highway 791	
Kneehill County	Torrington	74.0	46.0	Highway 805 – Wimborne, Linden	
Kneehill County		98.4	61.1	Highway 21 north – Trochu, Bashaw, Camrose	West end of Highway 21 concurrency
Kneehill County	Three Hills	108.1	67.2	Highway 583 (2nd Street N)	
Kneehill County		114.5	71.1	Highway 582 west – Didsbury Highway 21 south – Strathmore	East end of Highway 21 concurrency
Kneehill County		125.9	78.2	Highway 836 – Carbon	
Kneehill County		132.4	82.3	Highway 837 south – Bleriot Ferry	
↑ / ↓		138.4	86.0	Crosses the Red Deer River	
Starland County		143.2	89.0	Highway 839 north – Rumsey	
Starland County		148.1	92.0	UAR 113 north – Morrin	
Starland County		151.4	94.1	Highway 9 / Highway 56 – Hanna, Stettler, Drumheller, Calgary	Continues as Highway 9 east
1.000 mi = 1.609 km; 1.000 km = 0.621 mi: Concurrency terminus
