= Alberta Highway 26 =

Highway in Alberta, Canada

Highway 26

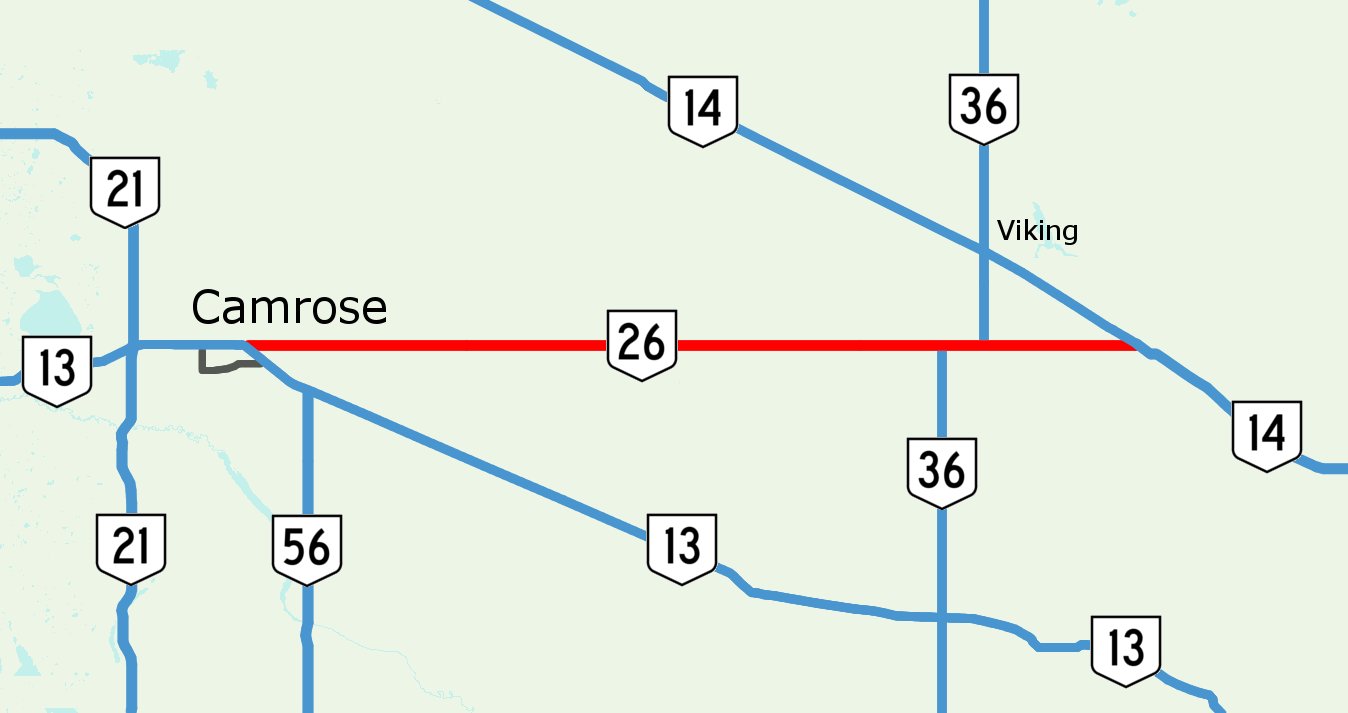

Route information
- Maintained by the Ministry of Transportation and Economic Corridors
- Length: 82.0 km (51.0 mi)

Major junctions
- West end: Highway 13 in Camrose
- Highway 56 near Camrose; Highway 36 near Viking
- East end: Highway 14 near Kinsella

Location
- Country: Canada
- Province: Alberta
- Specialized and rural municipalities: Camrose County, Beaver County
- Major cities: Camrose

Highway system
- Alberta Numbered Highway Network; List; Former
← Highway 25	→ Highway 27

Highway 26 is an east–west highway in central Alberta, Canada that connects Highway 13 in Camrose to Highway 14 near Kinsella. The route follows 12th Correction Line for its entire length, and does not pass through any communities east of Camrose.

The Highway 26 designation first belonged to a stretch of road near Drumheller. The present-day alignment near Camrose was not commissioned until the 1970s, and in 2009 was extended from Highway 36 to reach the current eastern terminus at Highway 14.

== Route description ==
Highway 26 begins in the eastern outskirts of Camrose where it splits due east from Highway 13, which bends southeast toward Ohaton. Highway 26 proceeds east along the 12th Correction Line, first meeting the northern terminus of Highway 56, which prior to 2021 was Highway 834 south. Highways 26 and 834 were concurrent for 5.2 km (3.2 mi) before Highway 834 branches off north to Round Hill. Highway 26 continues east, intersecting Highways 854, 855 and 857. Highway 26 meets Highway 36 approximately 12 km (7 mi) southwest of Viking and the two highways run concurrently for 3 km (2 mi) before Highway 36 turns north into Viking. After leaving Highway 36, the highway continues east to its end at Highway 14, approximately 4 km (2 mi) west of Kinsella.

== History ==
The original alignment of Highway 26 was in Kneehill County west of Drumheller. It began at Highway 9 and ran north for 20 km (12 mi), travelling north along present-day Highway 836 to Carbon, then turned west along present-day Highway 575 to its intersection with Highway 21. In 1962, Highway 21A was renumbered and absorbed as part of Highway 26, resulting in it continuing west along present-day Highway 575 to Acme, then south along present-day Highway 806 to Highway 9 in Beiseker, a total distance of 52 km (32 mi). In 1970, Highway 26 was decommissioned and in subsequent years was renumbered to its current designations.

The section of present-day Highway 26 between Camrose and Highway 36 was commissioned in the late 1970s and was incrementally paved throughout the 1980s. In 2009, Highway 615 between Highway 36 and Highway 14 was renumbered to become part of Highway 26.

== Major intersections ==
From west to east:

Location	km	mi	Destinations	Notes
Camrose	0.0	0.0	Highway 13 (48 Avenue) – Wetaskiwin, Provost	
Camrose County	5.8	3.6	Highway 56 south – Stettler	Former Highway 834 south
Camrose County	11.0	6.8	Highway 834 north – Round Hill, Tofield	
Camrose County	23.9	14.9	Highway 854 – Ryley, Bawlf	
Beaver County	36.9	22.9	Highway 855 – Holden, Daysland	
Beaver County	50.2	31.2	Highway 857 north – Bruce	
Beaver County	64.1	39.8	Highway 36 south – Killam	West end of Highway 36 concurrency
Beaver County	68.0	42.3	Highway 36 north – Viking	East end of Highway 36 concurrency
Beaver County	82.0	51.0	Highway 14 – Edmonton, Wainwright	West of Kinsella
1.000 mi = 1.609 km; 1.000 km = 0.621 mi: Concurrency terminus
