= Alberta Highway 838 =

Road in central Alberta, Canada

Highway 838
- North Dinosaur Trail

Route information
- Maintained by the Ministry of Transportation and Economic Corridors
- Length: 26 km (16 mi)
- Tourist routes: Dinosaur Trail
- Restrictions: Bleriot Ferry closed during the winter.

Major junctions
- Northwest end: Highway 837 near the Bleriot Ferry
- Southeast end: Highway 9 / Highway 56 in Drumheller

Location
- Country: Canada
- Province: Alberta
- Specialized and rural municipalities: Kneehill County

Highway system
- Alberta Provincial Highway Network; List; Former
← Highway 837	→ Highway 839

Alberta Provincial Highway No. 838, commonly referred to as Highway 838, is a short highway in central Alberta, Canada. It runs from Highway 837 across the Red Deer River on the free, cable-operated Bleriot Ferry to Highway 9 / Highway 56 in Drumheller. Outside of Drumheller, Highway 838 does not pass through any communities. All of Highway 838 is part of the Dinosaur Trail and is known as North Dinosaur Trail.

The Bleriot Ferry operates from late April to November.

== Major intersections ==
From northwest to southeast:

Location	km	mi	Destinations	Notes
Kneehill County	0	0.0	Highway 837 (Dinosaur Trail) – Hwy 27, Hwy 575	Dinosaur Trail follows Hwy 837 south 51.56861°N 112.91167°W
↑ / ↓	2	1.2	Bleriot Ferry crosses the Red Deer River	Operates from late April to November; 51.57306°N 112.88528°W
Starland County	6	3.7	Township Road 302 – Munson	Hwy 838 branches south 51.56111°N 112.84083°W
Drumheller	26	16	Highway 9 / Highway 56 – Hanna, Stettler, Calgary	51.47139°N 112.71222°W
1.000 mi = 1.609 km; 1.000 km = 0.621 mi: Route transition
