= Dinosaur Trail =

Motorized tourist route in Alberta, Canada

Dinosaur Trail

Route information
- Maintained by Alberta Transportation; Tourist loop around the Drumheller Valley
- Length: 47.3 km (29.4 mi)
- Component highways: Highway 9 / Highway 56; Highway 575; Highway 837; Highway 838
- Restrictions: Bleriot Ferry closed during the winter.

Location
- Country: Canada
- Province: Alberta
- Specialized and rural municipalities: Starland County, Kneehill County
- Towns: Drumheller

Highway system
- Alberta Provincial Highway Network; List; Former

The Dinosaur Trail is a circular tourist route in the province of Alberta, Canada, located in the Canadian badlands paralleling the Red Deer River on both sides, from Drumheller to the Bleriot Ferry. It is divided in two segments, with the South Dinosaur Trail following the south side of the river and uses portions of Highway 575 and Highway 837, while North Dinosaur Trail follows the north side of the river and is the entirety of Highway 838. The north and south segments of Dinosaur Trail are connected by the Highway 9 / Highway 56 concurrency within Drumheller.

== Route description ==
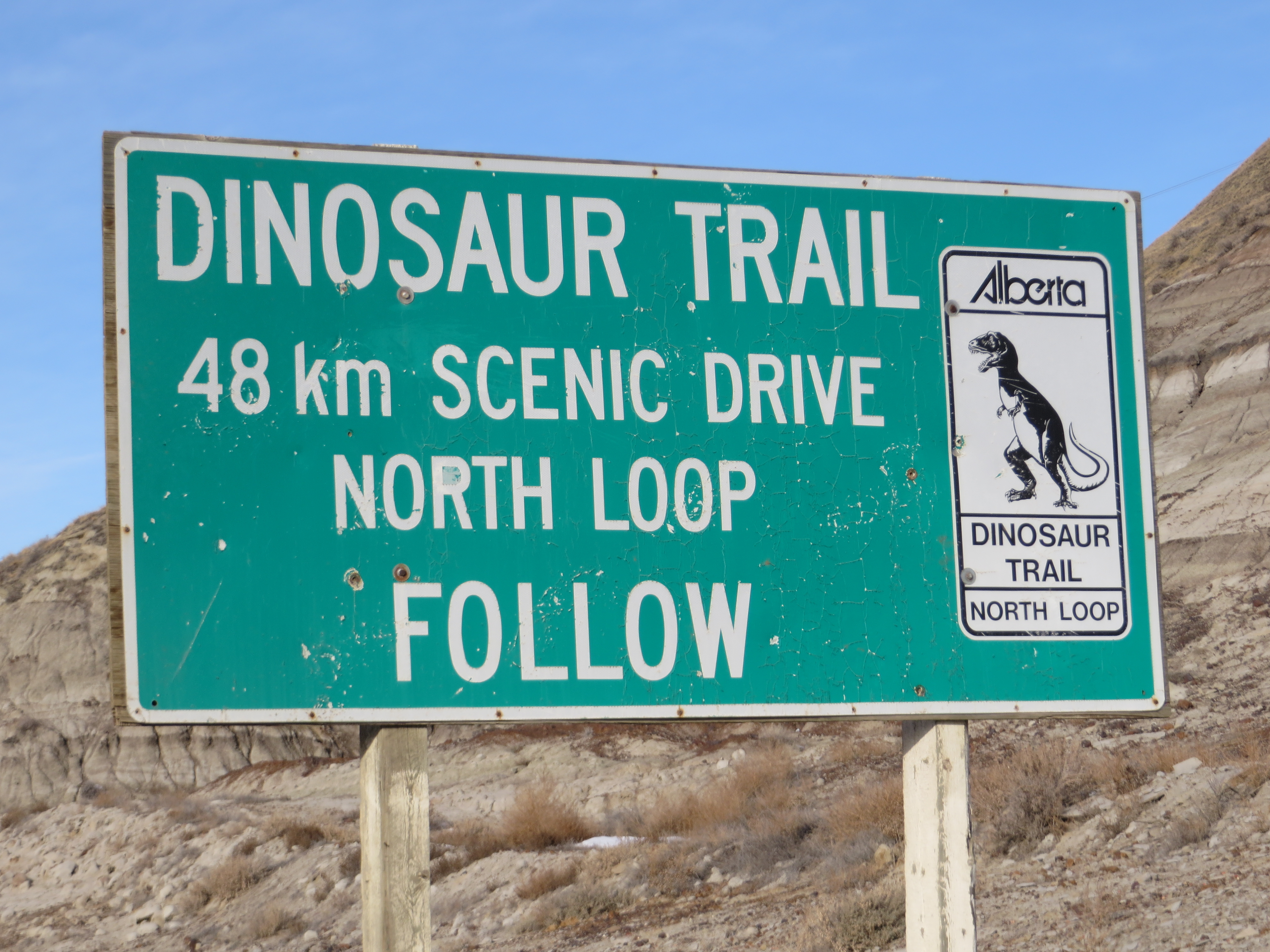
Sign marking the Dinosaur Trail in the Drumheller Valley

The Dinosaur Trail begins at the 2 Street SW / South Railway Avenue intersection (Highway 9 / 56) in Drumheller and travels west along South Railway Avenue (Highway 575). On the western outskirts of the Drumheller townsite, it passes the amphitheatre which houses the Canadian Badlands Passion Play, and continues past the former hamlet of Nacmine, which is now within Drumheller. At the Highway 575/837 intersection, the Dinosaur Trail turns onto Highway 837 while Highway 575 heads west towards Carbon. The Dinosaur Trail continues northwest along the Red Deer River to the intersection of Highway 837/838 intersection, where it turns east onto Highway 838. It crosses the Red Deer River on the free, cable-operated Bleriot Ferry, which has been running since 1913 and operates from late April to November. North of the river, the Dinosaur Trail briefly exits the valley and re-enters it near Horsethief Canyon. The Dinosaur Trail passes through Midland Provincial Park and past the Royal Tyrrell Museum of Palaeontology before ending at Highway 9 / 56 back in Drumheller. The loop is completed by following Highway 9 / 56 (Bridge Street and 2nd Street W) across the Red Deer River, through downtown Drumheller, and rejoining Highway 575.

== Major intersections ==
Beginning at the 2 Street SW and South Railway Avenue intersection in Drumheller and travelling clockwise.

Rural/specialized municipality	Location	km	mi	Destinations	Notes
Town of Drumheller	Drumheller (Townsite)	0.0	0.0	Highway 9 / Highway 56 to Highway 10 – Downtown, Calgary	Dinosaur Trail follows Highway 575 west
Town of Drumheller	Nacmine	5.6	3.5	2nd Street	
Kneehill County		11.3	7.0	Highway 575 west / Highway 837 north – Carbon	Dinosaur Trail follows Hwy 837 north
Kneehill County		20.5	12.7	Highway 837 north / Highway 838	Dinosaur Trail follows Hwy 838 east
Red Deer River		22.7	14.1	Bleriot Ferry (closed during winter)	
Starland County		26.8	16.7	Township Road 302 – Munson	Dinosaur Trail branches south
Town of Drumheller	Midland Provincial Park	41.0	25.5	Royal Tyrrell Museum access road	
Town of Drumheller	Drumheller (Townsite)	46.2	28.7	Highway 9 east / Highway 56 north – Hanna, Stettler	Dinosaur Trail follows Hwy 9 west / Hwy 56 south
Town of Drumheller	Drumheller (Townsite)	46.6	29.0	Crosses the Red Deer River	
Town of Drumheller	Drumheller (Townsite)	46.6– 47.3	29.0– 29.4	Passes through Downtown Drumheller	
Town of Drumheller	Drumheller (Townsite)	47.3 0.0	29.4 0.0	Highway 9 west / Highway 56 south to Highway 10 – Calgary; Highway 575 west (South Railway Avenue)	Dinosaur Trail follows Hwy 575 west
1.000 mi = 1.609 km; 1.000 km = 0.621 mi: Route transition
