= Alberta Highway 21A =

Highway in Alberta, Canada

Southern segment
- Length: 33 km (21 mi)
- South end: Highway 9 in Beiseker
- North end: Highway 21 near Carbon

Northern segment
- Length: 5 km (3.1 mi)
- West end: Highway 21 near Nevis
- East end: Highway 12 near Nevis

Location
- Country: Canada
- Province: Alberta
- Specialized and rural municipalities: Rocky View County, Kneehill County, County of Stettler No. 6
- Villages: Beiseker, Acme

Highway system
- Alberta Provincial Highway Network; List; Former
| ← Highway 21 | → Highway 22 |

Alberta Provincial Highway No. 21A, commonly referred to as Highway 21A, was the designation of two former spur routes of Highway 21 in Alberta, Canada.

== Southern segment ==
The southern section of Highway 21A was a 33 km (21 mi) highway which started at Highway 9 in the Village of Beiseker and traveled north for 13 km (8 mi) to the Village of Acme and then turned east for 20 km (12 mi) to Highway 21, 8 km (5 mi) northeast of the Village of Carbon. It was established in 1958/59 when Highway 21 was realigned from Beiseker to Highway 1 (Trans-Canada Highway) east of Strathmore. Highway 21A was renumbered to Highway 26 in 1962/63, and in 1972/73 the north–south section became Highway 806 while the east–west section became Highway 575.

== Northern segment ==
The northern section of Highway 21A was a 5 km (3 mi) highway that connected Highway 21 with Highway 12 near the Hamlet of Nevis. In the early-1990s, Highway 11 was extended east from Highway 815 near Joffre to Highway 21; when construction was completed, Highway 21A became part of Highway 11.
