= Alberta Highway 56 =

Highway in Alberta

Highway 56
- Highway 56 highlighted in red

Route information
- Maintained by the Ministry of Transportation and Economic Corridors
- Length: 249.8 km (155.2 mi)

Major junctions
- South end: Highway 1 (TCH) near Crowfoot
- Highway 10 in Drumheller; Highway 9 in Drumheller; Highway 9 / Highway 27 near Morrin; Highway 12 in Stettler; Highway 53 near Donalda; Highway 13 near Camrose
- North end: Highway 26 near Camrose

Location
- Country: Canada
- Province: Alberta
- Specialized and rural municipalities: Wheatland County, Starland County, Stettler No. 6 County, Camrose County
- Towns: Stettler, Drumheller

Highway system
- Alberta Provincial Highway Network; List; Former
← Highway 55	→ Highway 58

Alberta Provincial Highway No. 56, commonly referred to as Highway 56, is a north-south highway in central Alberta, Canada. It begins near the locality of Crowfoot, 20 km (12 mi) northwest of Bassano, at Highway 1 (Trans-Canada Highway). It continues through Drumheller and Stettler before ending at Highway 26, 6 km (4 mi) east of Camrose.

== History ==
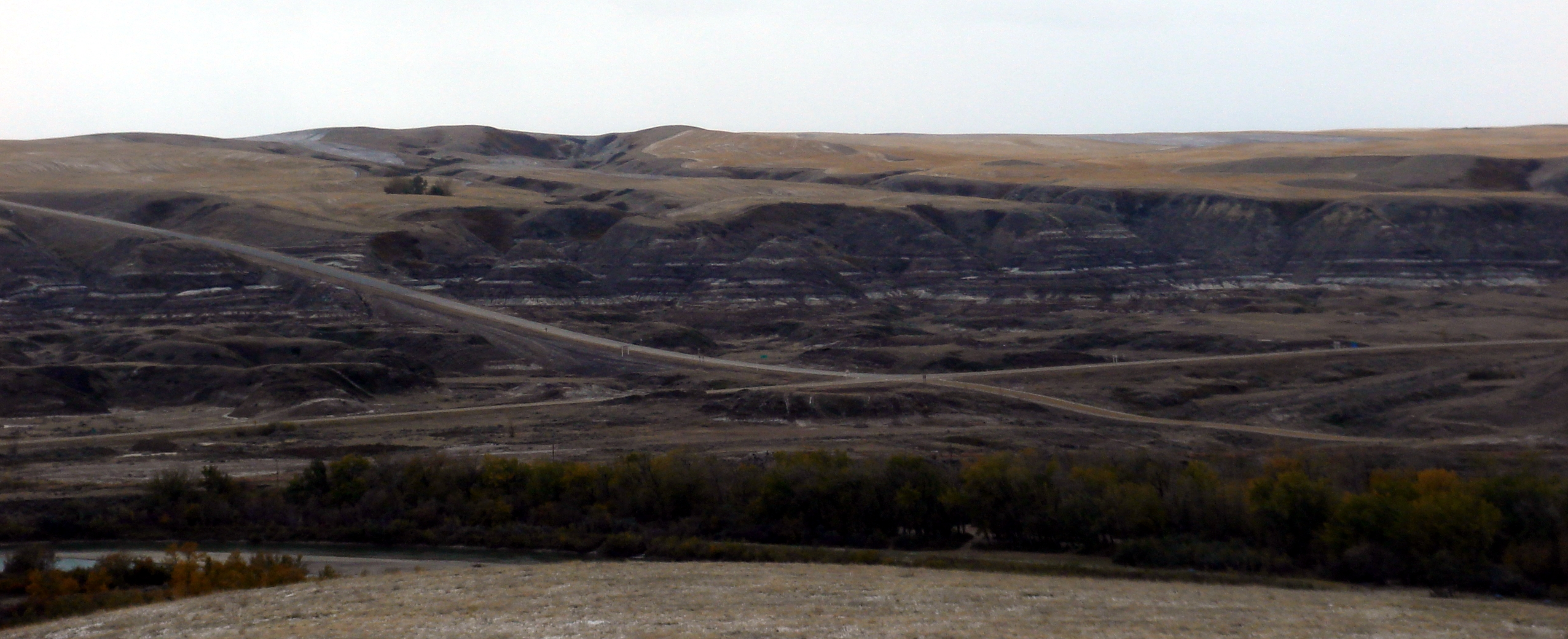
Intersection of Highway 56 and Highway 10

In the early 1990s, there was talk of extending Highway 56 from the Highway 1 to the US border. This was due in large part to then Alberta Premier Don Getty, who at the time was also the MLA for Stettler. All talk of this endeavour stopped once Getty retired from politics and was succeeded as premier by Ralph Klein.

In September 2021, a 4.0 km (2.5 mi) section of Highway 834 was renumbered to Highway 56, extending its northern terminus from Highway 13 to Highway 26. The renumbering was a response to local requests to align the numbering of the short portion of highway with the pre-existing portions of Highway 56. It also rendered the 5.2 km (3.2 mi) Highway 26 / Highway 834 concurrency obsolete.

== Major intersections ==
Starting from the south end of Highway 56:

Rural/specialized municipality	Location	km	mi	Destinations	Notes
Wheatland County		0.0	0.0	Highway 1 (TCH) – Calgary, Medicine Hat	Highway 56 southern terminus; continues as Range Road 201 to Crowfoot Ferry
Wheatland County		19.5	12.1	Highway 561 east	South end of Highway 561 concurrency
Wheatland County	Hussar	22.7	14.1	Highway 561 west – Standard	North end of Highway 561 concurrency
Wheatland County		39.4	24.5	Highway 564	
Wheatland County	Dalum	52.4	32.6	Highway 569	
Town of Drumheller		64.7	40.2	Highway 10 east (Hoodoo Trail) – East Coulee	South end of Highway 10 concurrency
Town of Drumheller		66.1	41.1	Highway 10X south – Wayne	Rosedale
Town of Drumheller		72.8	45.2	Highway 10 ends Highway 9 west / 5 Street SE – Calgary	North end of Highway 10 concurrency; south end of Highway 9 concurrency
Town of Drumheller		73.7	45.8	Highway 575 west (South Dinosaur Trail) / 2 Street SW – Nacmine	
Town of Drumheller		74.3	46.2	Crosses Red Deer River	
Town of Drumheller		74.8	46.5	Highway 838 west (North Dinosaur Trail) – Royal Tyrrell Museum	
Town of Drumheller		75.1	46.7	Highway 576 east	
Starland County	Munson	85.4	53.1	Township Road 302	
Starland County		95.0	59.0	Highway 9 east – Hanna, Saskatoon; Highway 27 west – Morrin, Three Hills	North end of Highway 9 concurrency
Starland County		117.7	73.1	Highway 585 – Rumsey, Trochu	
County of Stettler No. 6		130.6	81.2	Highway 589 east – Byemoor, Endiang	
County of Stettler No. 6	Big Valley	137.0	85.1	Highway 590 west – Innisfail	
County of Stettler No. 6	Big Valley	138.6	86.1	UAR 55 west	
County of Stettler No. 6		156.4	97.2	Highway 594 west	
Town of Stettler		170.0	105.6	Highway 12 – Lacombe, Consort	
County of Stettler No. 6		180.8	112.3	Highway 601 – White Sands, Red Willow	
↑ / ↓		200.2	124.4	Highway 53 – Bashaw, Donalda, Forestburg	
Camrose County	Meeting Creek	212.4	132.0	UAR 210 east	
Camrose County		223.8	139.1	Highway 609 west – Edberg, Ferintosh	South end of Highway 609 concurrency
Camrose County		224.1	139.2	Crosses Battle River	
Camrose County		227.0	141.1	Highway 609 east – Rosalind	North end of Highway 609 concurrency
Camrose County		245.6	152.6	Highway 13 – Camrose, Provost	Former Highway 56 northern terminus; formerly Highway 834. Roundabout under construction as of 2025
Camrose County		249.8	155.2	Highway 26 – Camrose, Viking	Highway 56 northern terminus
1.000 mi = 1.609 km; 1.000 km = 0.621 mi: Concurrency terminus
