= Alberta Highway 837 =

Highway in Alberta, Canada

Highway 837

Route information
- Maintained by the Ministry of Transportation and Economic Corridors
- Length: 23 km (14 mi)
- Tourist routes: Dinosaur Trail

Major junctions
- South end: Highway 575 west of Drumheller
- Highway 838 near the Bleriot Ferry
- North end: Highway 27 west of Morrin

Location
- Country: Canada
- Province: Alberta
- Specialized and rural municipalities: Kneehill County

Highway system
- Alberta Provincial Highway Network; List; Former
| ← Highway 836 | → Highway 838 |

Alberta Provincial Highway No. 837, commonly referred to as Highway 837, is a short north–south highway in central Alberta, Canada. It runs from the Highway 575 to Highway 27 in Kneehill County along the west bank of the Red Deer River in the Canadian badlands; it does not pass through any communities. The section between Highway 575 and Highway 838 is part of the Dinosaur Trail.

== Major intersections ==
From south to north:

| Location | km | mi | Destinations | Notes |
|---|---|---|---|---|
| Kneehill County | 0 | 0.0 | Highway 575 (Dinosaur Trail) – Carbon, Drumheller | South end of Dinosaur Trail; Dinosaur Trail continues along Hwy 575 west 51.502194°N 112.851528°W |
| Kneehill County | 9 | 5.6 | Highway 838 east (Dinosaur Trail) – Bleriot Ferry | North end of Dinosaur Trail; Dinosaur Trail continues along Hwy 838; 51.568528°N 112.911667°W |
| Kneehill County | 23 | 14 | Highway 27 – Three Hills, Morrin, Hanna | 51.649111°N 112.981389°W |
1.000 mi = 1.609 km; 1.000 km = 0.621 mi: Route transition
