= Midland Provincial Park =

Park in Alberta, Canada

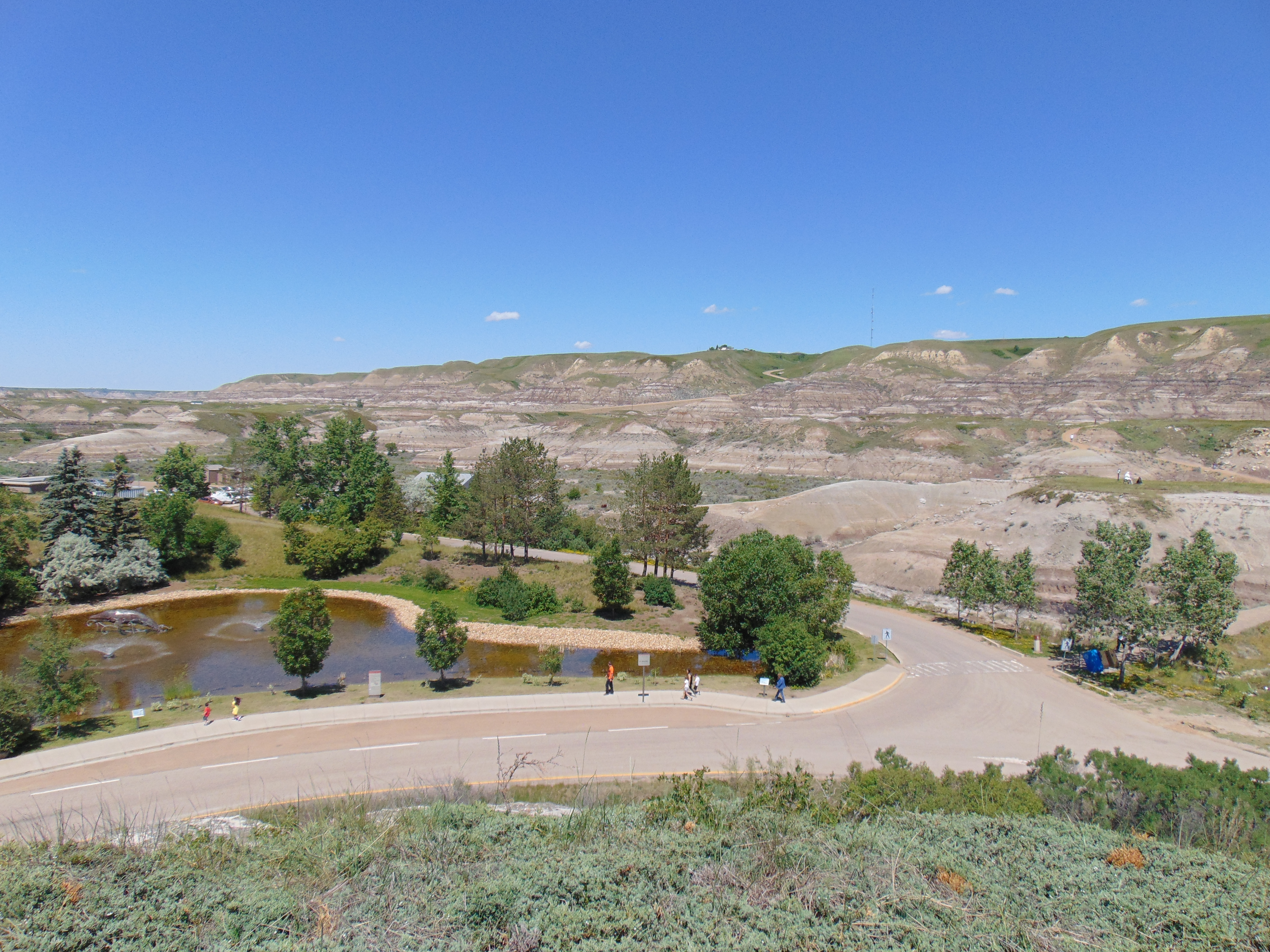

- Location within Alberta
- Interactive map of Midland Provincial Park
- Location: Drumheller / Starland County, Alberta, Canada
- Nearest city: Drumheller
- Coordinates: 51°28′41″N 112°46′20″W
- Area: 6.3 km^{2} (2.4 sq mi)
- Established: 5 Jun 1979
- Governing body: Alberta Tourism, Parks and Recreation

Midland Provincial Park is a provincial park located in Alberta, Canada.

Once the site of the Midland Coal Mine, it was designated as a provincial park on June 5, 1979. It now hosts the Royal Tyrrell Museum of Palaeontology.

It is located 6 km west of Drumheller on Highway 838 (North Dinosaur Trail).

Activities in the park include canoeing, kayaking, fishing, wildlife viewing and hiking through willows and cottonwoods along the Red Deer River. Points of interest are fossil beds, a mine site and the Royal Tyrrell Museum of Palaeontology.

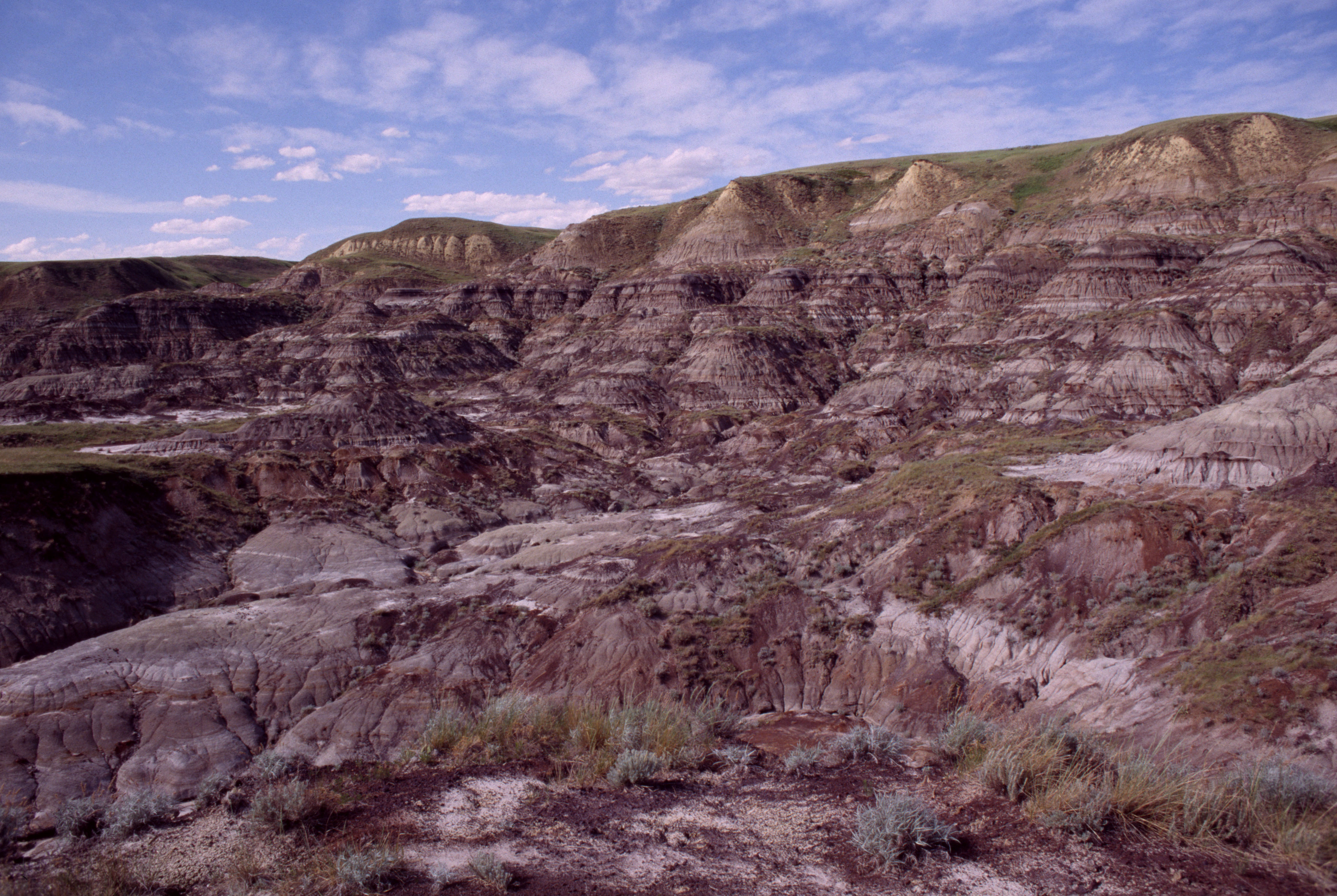
Badlands in Midland Provincial Park

== See also ==
- List of provincial parks in Alberta
