= Alberta Highway 575 =

Highway in Alberta

Highway 575

Route information
- Maintained by the Ministry of Transportation and Economic Corridors
- Length: 79 km (49 mi)
- Tourist routes: Dinosaur Trail

Major junctions
- West end: Highway 791 west of Acme
- Highway 806 in Acme; Highway 21 near Carbon; Highway 836 near Carbon; Highway 837 near Drumheller
- East end: Highway 9 / Highway 56 in Drumheller

Location
- Country: Canada
- Province: Alberta
- Specialized and rural municipalities: Mountain View County, Kneehill County
- Towns: Drumheller
- Villages: Acme, Carbon

Highway system
- Alberta Numbered Highway Network; List; Former
← Highway 574	→ Highway 576

Highway 575 is the designation of an east-west highway in central Alberta, Canada. It runs from the Highway 791, through Acme and Carbon, to Highway 9 and Highway 56 in Drumheller. The section between Highway 837 and Drumheller is part of the Dinosaur Trail.

== History ==
The section of Highway 575 between Acme and Carbon has had a variety of designations in its history. The 5 km (3 mi) section between Carbon and Highway 21, along with a portion of present-day Highway 836, was originally designated as part of Highway 26; while the 20 km (12 mi) section between Highway 21 and Acme, along with present-day Highway 806, was the original alignment of Highway 21. In 1958, the southern portion of Highway 21 was realigned to Highway 1 (Trans-Canada Highway) east of Strathmore, and the former section was renumbered as Highway 21A; however, in 1962, the route was again renumbered to Highway 26. Highway 26 was decommissioned in 1970 and in 1972, it was renumbered to its current designation.

== Major intersections ==
From south to north:

Rural/specialized municipality	Location	km	mi	Destinations	Notes
Mountain View County		0.0	0.0	Highway 791 – Carstairs, Chestermere	
Kneehill County	Acme	21.1	13.1	Highway 806 south – Beiseker	Highway 806 concurrency west end
Kneehill County	Acme	22.3	13.9	Highway 806 north – Linden	Highway 806 concurrency east end
Kneehill County		35.8	22.2	Range Road 243 – Swalwell	
Kneehill County		40.8	25.4	Highway 21 – Three Hills, Strathmore	
Kneehill County		45.9	28.5	Highway 836 south – Carbon	Highway 836 concurrency west end
Kneehill County		52.4	32.6	Highway 836 north	Highway 836 concurrency east end
Kneehill County		68.1	42.3	Highway 837 north (Dinosaur Trail)	Becomes part of Dinosaur Trail
Town of Drumheller	Nacmine	73.8	45.9	2nd Street	
Town of Drumheller	Drumheller (Townsite)	79.4	49.3	Highway 9 / Highway 56 (2 Street SW / South Railway Avenue) – Hanna, Stettler, Calgary	Continues as Highway 9 west / Highway 56 south (South Railway Avenue) to Highway 10
1.000 mi = 1.609 km; 1.000 km = 0.621 mi: Concurrency terminus; Route transition
