= Alberta Highway 806 =

Highway in Alberta

Highway 806
- Highway 806 highlighted in red

Route information
- Maintained by the Ministry of Transportation and Economic Corridors
- Length: 37.1 km (23.1 mi)

Major junctions
- South end: Highway 9 / Highway 72 at Beiseker
- Highway 575 in Acme; Highway 582 near Linden
- North end: Highway 583 near Three Hills

Location
- Country: Canada
- Province: Alberta
- Specialized and rural municipalities: Rocky View County, Kneehill County
- Villages: Beiseker, Acme, Linden

Highway system
- Alberta Numbered Highway Network; List; Former
← Highway 805	→ Highway 808

Alberta Provincial Highway No. 806, commonly referred to as Highway 806, is a north–south highway in central Alberta, Canada. It runs from the Highway 9 / Highway 72 junction in the Village of Beiseker, through the Villages of Acme and Linden, to Highway 583 located 16 km (10 mi) west of the Town of Three Hills.

== History ==
The 13-kilometre (8 mi) section of Highway 806 between Beiseker and Acme has had multiple designations in its history. Along with a portion of Highway 575, the route was originally designated as part of Highway 21. In 1958, the southern portion of Highway 21 was realigned to Highway 1 (Trans-Canada Highway) east of Strathmore, and the former section was renumbered as Highway 21A. However, in 1962 the route was again renumbered to Highway 26, as at the time it connected the Village of Carbon Highway 9 and Highway 21. Highway 26 was decommissioned in 1970 and in 1972, it was renumbered to its current designation.

== Major intersections ==
From south to north:

Rural/specialized municipality	Location	km	mi	Destinations	Notes
Rocky View County	Beiseker	0.0	0.0	Highway 9 / Highway 72 west – Drumheller, Crossfield, Irricana, Calgary	
Kneehill County	Acme	12.9	8.0	Highway 575 west – Carstairs	South end of Highway 575 concurrency
Kneehill County	Acme	14.2	8.8	Highway 575 east – Carbon	North end of Highway 575 concurrency
Kneehill County	Linden	24.1	15.0		
Kneehill County		30.6	19.0	Highway 582 – Didsbury	East of Sunnyslope
Kneehill County		37.1	23.1	Highway 583 – Torrington, Three Hills	
1.000 mi = 1.609 km; 1.000 km = 0.621 mi: Concurrency terminus
