= Springwater School =

Coordinates: 53.5889°N 113.7072°W

Location of Springwater School in Alberta

Springwater School was built in 1922 and is located in Starland County, 10 miles north of the Michichi turn off on Highway 9 in Alberta, Canada. The School was part of the Drumheller School Division No. 30. Even though it is no longer in use, it has been well maintained by the Springwater Homestead Foundation.

== History ==
Built by a local stonemason, the school was built with all local stones. There were only ten students when the school originally opened. In addition to being a school, the building also hosted many community events, even after closing as a school. In April, 1952, the school was sold to the Majestic Farrell Lake Women's Institute. It was sold for $200 and remained as a community hall.

== Film ==
The 1988 movie Bye Bye Blues was filmed in the area, and the Springwater School was used as a set.
