= Horseshoe Canyon =

Horseshoe Canyon may refer to:

- Horseshoe Canyon (Alberta) a canyon in Alberta, Canada
  - Horseshoe Canyon Formation, a stratigraphical unit in the Western Canadian Sedimentary Basin
- Horseshoe Canyon (Chiricahua Mountains), a canyon in Cochise County, Arizona, United States
- Horseshoe Canyon (Utah) in southern Utah, United States
