= Gartly, Alberta =

Coordinates: 51.56683°N 112.58516°W

Location of Gartly in Alberta.

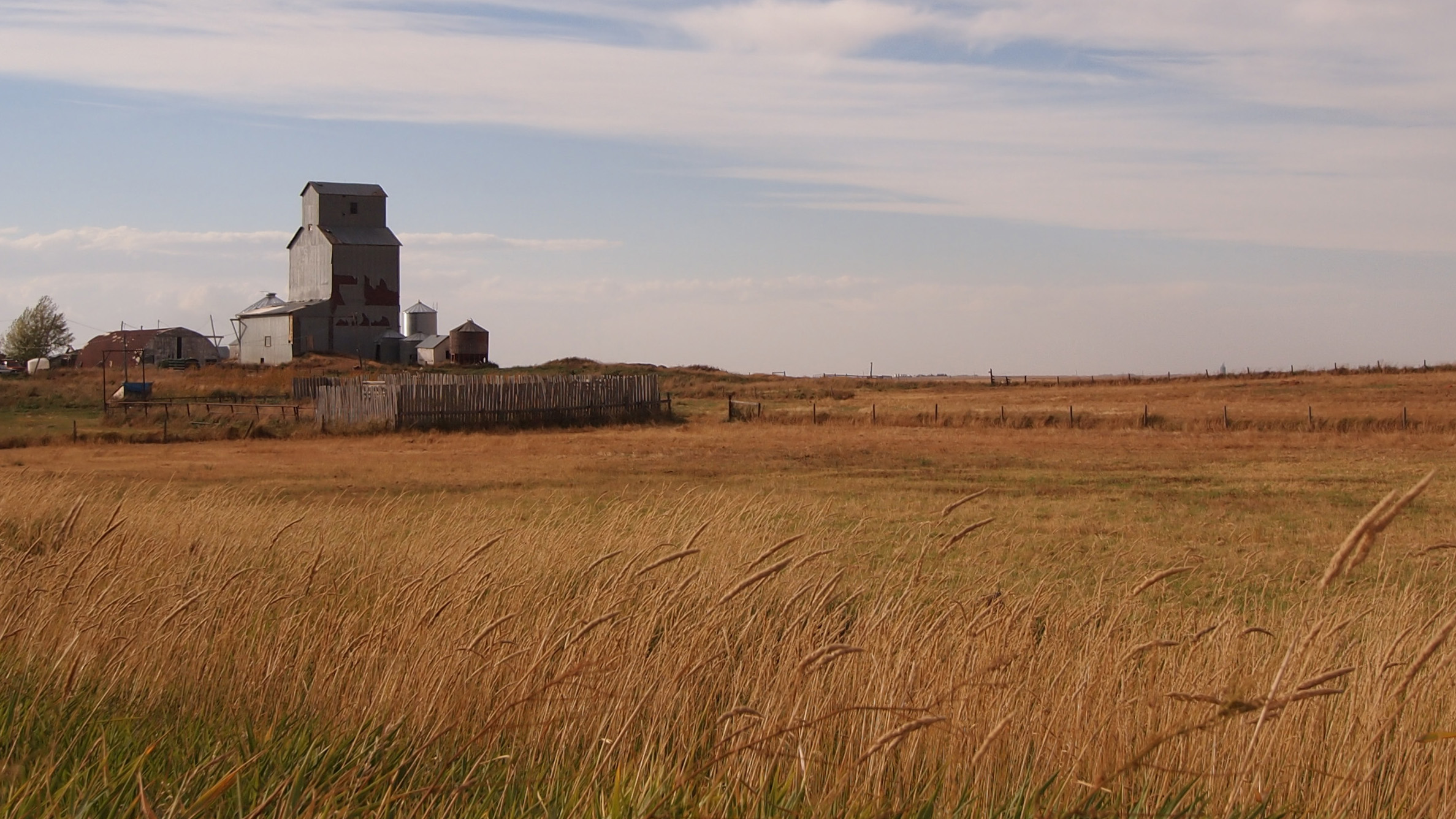
Wheat field and elevator in Gartly

Gartly is a locality in Alberta, Canada. It is located in the southern section of Starland County. The settlement was built near to a now defunct railway.

The community takes its name from Gartly, in Scotland.
