= Horsethief Canyon (Alberta) =

Canyon 16 km northwest of Drumheller, in Starland County, Alberta, Canada

Coordinates: 51°32′17.6″N 112°52′13.2″W

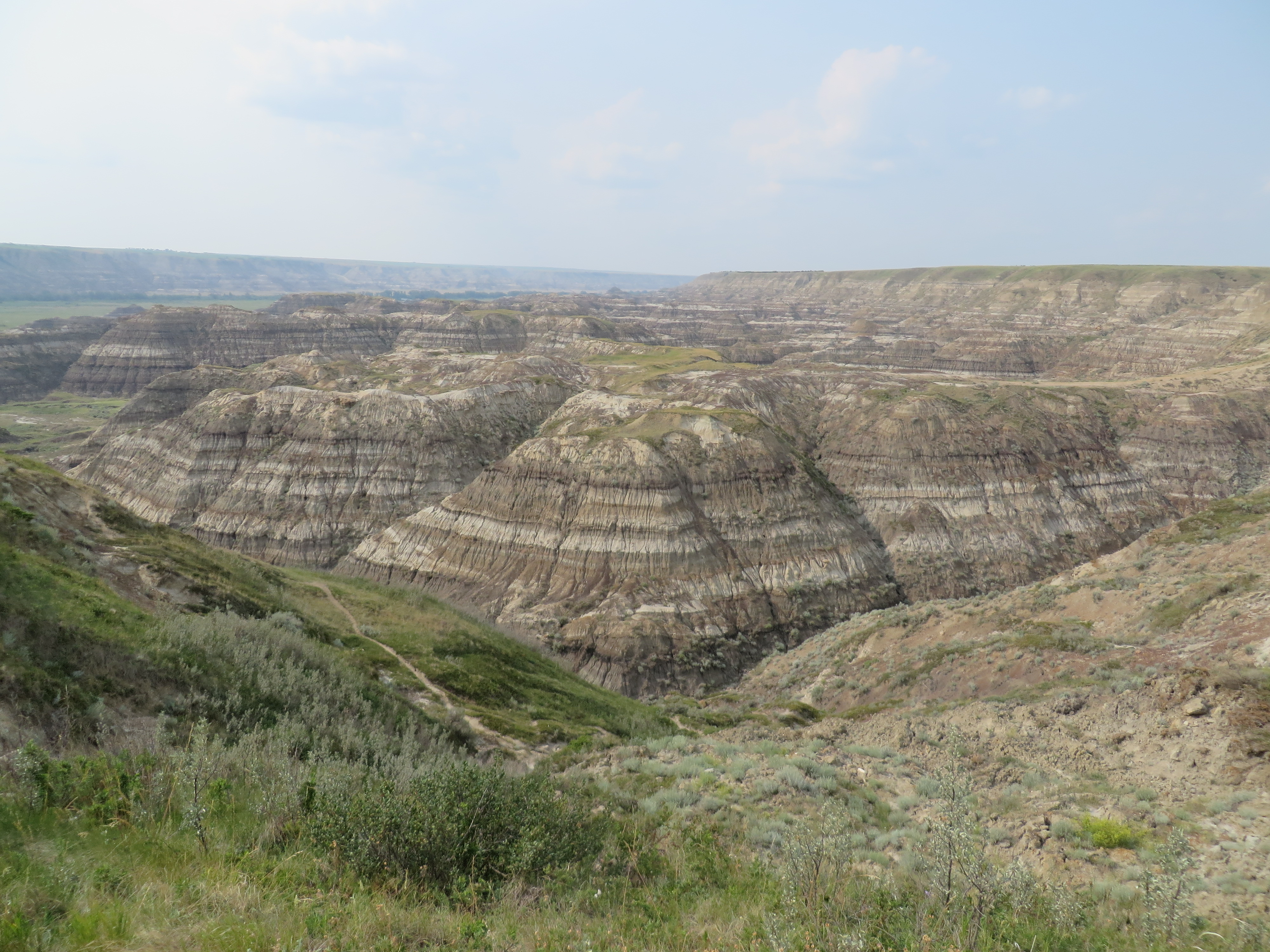
Horsethief Canyon

Horsethief Canyon is found 16 kilometres (9.9 mi) northwest of the town of Drumheller, in Starland County in the province of Alberta, Canada. It is on the east bank of the Red Deer River, along Highway 838 (known locally as North Dinosaur Trail). Both Horsethief Canyon and Horseshoe Canyon are distinctive features of the surrounding badlands of central Alberta. Although the two canyons look similar, they are separated by several kilometres and were created by different tributaries of the Red Deer River.

The name "Horsethief" was given to this area because of an illegal horse trade network used in the last century. Horses being smuggled illegally between the United States and Alberta were supposedly hidden in this canyon, but the true origin of the name is not clear.

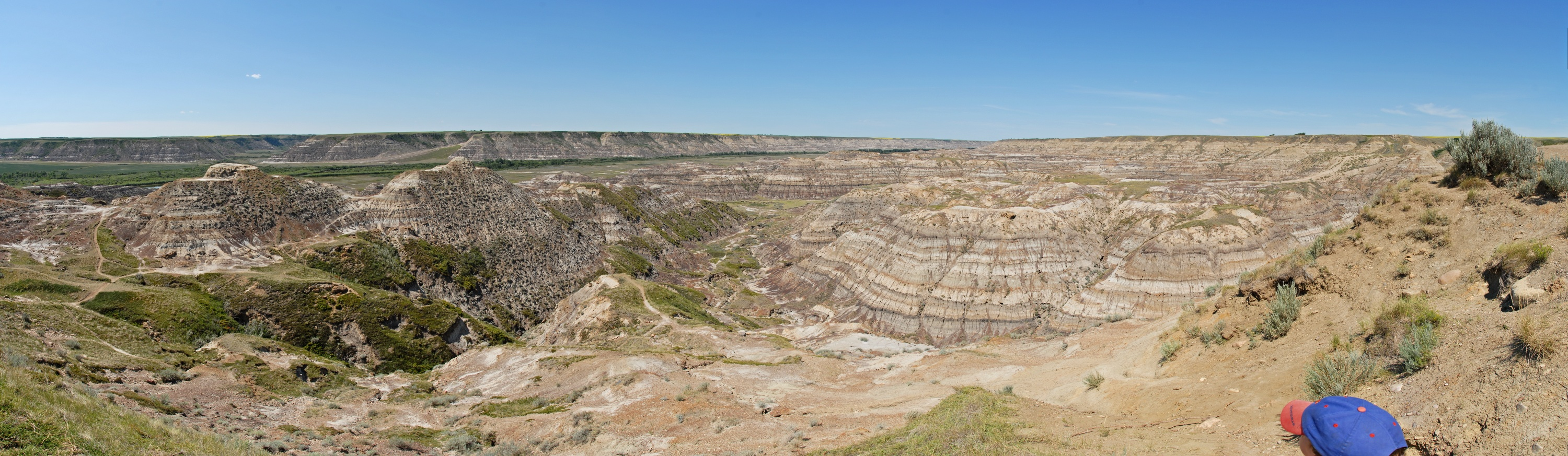
Horsethief canyon, Alberta, Canada

== See also ==
- Geography of Alberta
