= Carl Stettler =

Swiss settler (1861–1920)

Carl Stettler (June 6, 1861 – February 1, 1920) was a Swiss-Canadian farmer, businessman and postmaster, after whom the town of Stettler, Alberta is named.

Stettler was born at Eggiwil near Bern, Switzerland, on June 6, 1861. He moved from Switzerland to the U.S. in 1886. After travelling and working across the U.S., he arrived in Alberta, Canada, in 1903 and bought a Dominion Lands Act homestead plot two-and-a-half miles east of the present town of Stettler, Alberta. He founded and was the first postmaster of the Swiss and German colony of Blumenau, Alberta in 1905. In the same year, the building of the Canadian Pacific Railway (CPR) required moving the entire town of Blumenau to the Stettler site. Stettler became postmaster of the new town, was a CPR land agent there, and the town was named in his honour. He was a member of the first Town Council of Stettler. He built and owned the National Hotel in Stettler which was destroyed by fire in 1908.

After selling the property he moved east to Castor, Alberta where he built and owned two other hotels the National Hotel which burned down in 1924 and the Cosmopolitan Hotel which is still standing and organized the Castor Coal Company. He remained in Castor until 1919. In his final year, he moved back to Stettler. He died on February 1, 1920, while visiting Memphis, Tennessee. His remains were buried in Stettler.

== See also ==
=== Archives ===
There is a Carl Stettler fonds at Library and Archives Canada. The archival reference number is R1762.
