= Michichi =

- Hamlet
- Location of Michichi Michichi (Canada)
- Coordinates: 51°35′07″N 112°32′01″W
- Country: Canada
- Province: Alberta
- Region: Southern Alberta
- Census division: 5
- Municipal district: Starland County
- Founder: Canadian Northern Railway
- Named for: Hand Hills

Government
  - Type: Unincorporated
  - Governing body: Starland County Council

Population (2013)
  - Total: 34
- Time zone: UTC−06:00 (Alberta Time)
- Area codes: 403, 587, 825

Michichi (/mɪˈtʃɪtʃi/) is a hamlet in southern Alberta, Canada, within Starland County. It is located 7 kilometres (4.3 mi) south of Highway 9, approximately 121 kilometres (75 mi) northeast of Calgary.

The name Michichi derives from the Cree word ᒥᒋᐦᒋᕀ (micihciy 'hand'), a reference to the nearby Hand Hills.

== Demographics ==
Population history of Michichi
Year	Pop.	±%
1941	73	—
1951	57	−21.9%
1956	62	+8.8%
1961	52	−16.1%
1966	35	−32.7%
1971	28	−20.0%
1976	30	+7.1%
1981	25	−16.7%
1986	33	+32.0%
1991	42	+27.3%
Source: Statistics Canada

The population of Michichi according to the 2013 municipal census conducted by Starland County is 34.

== See also ==
- List of communities in Alberta
- List of hamlets in Alberta
