= Rumsey, Alberta =

Rumsey
- Hamlet
- Location of Rumsey Rumsey (Canada)
- Coordinates: 51°50′31″N 112°50′33″W
- Country: Canada
- Province: Alberta
- Region: Southern Alberta
- Census division: 5
- Municipal district: Starland County

Government
  - Type: Unincorporated
  - Governing body: Starland County Council

Population (2013)
  - Total: 64
- Time zone: UTC−06:00 (Alberta Time)
- Area codes: 403, 587, 825

Rumsey is a hamlet in southern Alberta, Canada within Starland County. It is located 8 kilometres (5.0 mi) west of Highway 56, approximately 80 kilometres (50 mi) southeast of Red Deer.

== Demographics ==
The population of Rumsey according to the 2013 municipal census conducted by Starland County is 64.

== See also ==
- List of communities in Alberta
- List of former urban municipalities in Alberta
- List of hamlets in Alberta
