= Morrin, Alberta =

Morrin
- Village
- Village of Morrin
- Location within Starland County Location within Alberta
- Coordinates: 51°39′30″N 112°45′59″W
- Country: Canada
- Province: Alberta
- Region: Southern Alberta
- Census Division: No. 5
- Municipal district: Starland County
- Incorporated
  - Village: April 16, 1920

Government
  - Mayor: Chris Hall
  - Governing body: Morrin Village Council

Area (2021)
  - Land: 0.67 km^{2} (0.26 sq mi)
- Elevation: 832 m (2,730 ft)

Population (2021)
  - Total: 205
  - Density: 305.2/km^{2} (790/sq mi)
- Time zone: UTC−06:00 (Alberta Time)
- Highways: 27, 9, 56
- Waterways: West Michichi Creek, Red Deer River
- Website: www.morrin.ca

Morrin is a village in central Alberta, Canada. It is located 26 km north of the Town of Drumheller, along Highway 27 and the Railink Central Western railway.

The Morrin Bridge Provincial recreation area is located 10 km west of the village, in the Red Deer River valley, and Dry Island Buffalo Jump Provincial Park is located 40 km north.

Morrin was originally named "Blooming Prairie" but was renamed Morrin in honour of the engineer of the first train to the village.

== Demographics ==
In the 2021 Census of Population conducted by Statistics Canada, the Village of Morrin had a population of 205 living in 113 of its 131 total private dwellings, a change of −14.6% from its 2016 population of 240. With a land area of 0.67 km^{2} (0.26 sq mi), it had a population density of 306.0/km^{2} (792.5/sq mi) in 2021.

In the 2016 Census of Population conducted by Statistics Canada, the Village of Morrin recorded a population of 240 living in 110 of its 132 total private dwellings, a −2% change from its 2011 population of 245. With a land area of 0.67 km^{2} (0.26 sq mi), it had a population density of 358.2/km^{2} (927.8/sq mi) in 2016.

== See also ==
- List of communities in Alberta
- List of francophone communities in Alberta
- List of villages in Alberta
