= Horseshoe Canyon (Alberta) =

Region of badlands in Alberta, Canada

Coordinates: 51°27′09″N 112°53′28″W

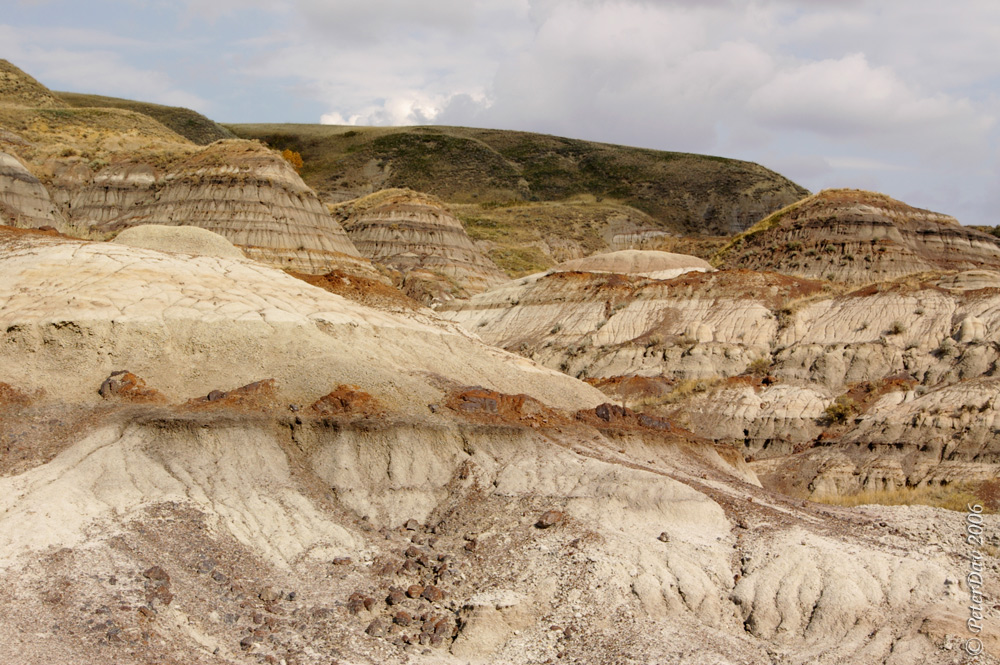
Badlands, Drumheller

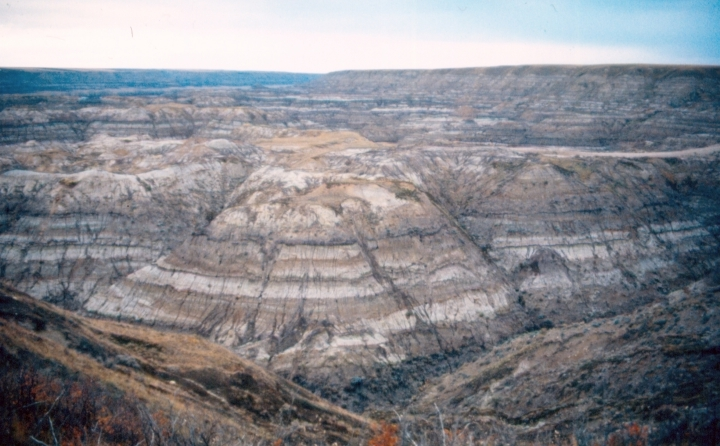
Horseshoe Canyon in 1988

Horseshoe Canyon is a region of badlands surrounded by prairie in the province of Alberta, Canada. It is located about 11 miles (17 km) west of the town of Drumheller, Alberta, along Highway 9.

The canyon gets its name from its horseshoe shape, defined by two coulees that flow into the Kneehill Creek, a tributary of the Red Deer River. The canyon's two arms are approximately 5 km long each, extending from Highway 9 to Kneehill Creek, at two former mining communities of Dunphy and Gatine. In turn, it gives the name to the Horseshoe Canyon Formation.

In 2020, a boy named Nathan Hrushkin discovered a dinosaur fossil at the canyon dating back to 69 million years.

== See also ==
- Geography of Alberta
