= Bleriot Ferry =

Cable ferry in Alberta, Canada

Coordinates: 51°34′23″N 112°53′07″W

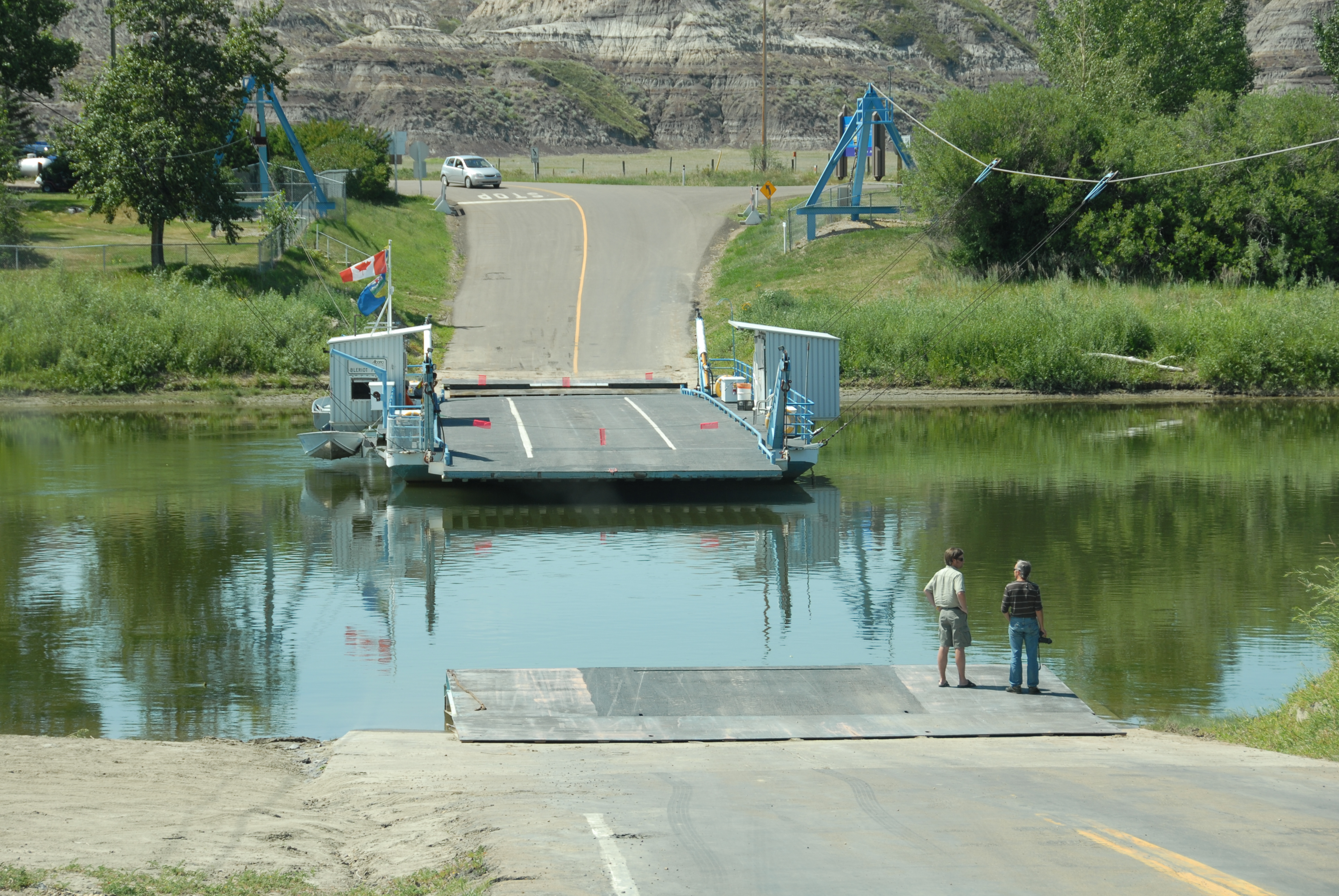
- Locale: Kneehill County, Starland County
- Waterway: Red Deer River
- Transit type: Automobile
- Operator: Alberta Transportation
- System length: 105 m (344 ft)
- Website: Ferries - Alberta Transportation

The Bleriot Ferry is a cable ferry in Alberta, Canada. It links the two sections of the North Dinosaur Trail (Highway 838) as it crosses the Red Deer River from Kneehill County on the west, to Starland County on the east.

Originally known as the Munson Ferry, it was commissioned in 1913 with Andre Bleriot, brother of aviator Louis Blériot, as its first operator. In addition to providing an essential transport service, it acted as a major social hub in the Drumheller area.

The ferry operates from late April to November.
