= Linden, Alberta =

Linden
- Village
- Village of Linden
- Motto: Rural Industrial Capital of Alberta
- Location within Alberta
- Coordinates: 51°35′26″N 113°29′0″W
- Country: Canada
- Province: Alberta
- Region: Central Alberta
- Census Division: No. 5
- Municipal district: Kneehill County
- Founded: 1902
- Incorporated
  - Village: January 1, 1964

Government
  - Mayor: Flo Robinson
  - Deputy Mayor: Kelly Klassen
  - Governing body: Linden Village Council

Area (2021)
  - Land: 2.55 km^{2} (0.98 sq mi)
- Elevation: 890 m (2,920 ft)

Population (2021)
  - Total: 747
- Time zone: UTC−06:00 (Alberta Time)
- Postal code: T0M
- Area code: 403
- Highways: 806
- Waterways: Kneehill Creek
- Website: Official website

Linden is a village located in central Alberta, Canada that is surrounded by Kneehill County. It is located 28 km (17 mi) southwest of Three Hills and 26 km (16 mi) north of Beiseker.

The area surrounding the village was originally settled by members of the Mennonite church, and many current residents trace their heritage to this group. The first post office was opened in 1949. Linden was incorporated as a village in 1964.

== Demographics ==
In the 2021 Census of Population conducted by Statistics Canada, the Village of Linden had a population of 747 living in 297 of its 333 total private dwellings, a change of −9.8% from its 2016 population of 828. With a land area of 2.55 km^{2} (0.98 sq mi), it had a population density of 292.9/km^{2} (758.7/sq mi) in 2021.

In the 2016 Census of Population conducted by Statistics Canada, the Village of Linden recorded a population of 828 living in 306 of its 331 total private dwellings, a 14.2% change from its 2011 population of 725. With a land area of 2.58 km^{2} (1.00 sq mi), it had a population density of 320.9/km^{2} (831.2/sq mi) in 2016.

== Education ==
Dr. Elliot School is a K-9 school within Linden, with Kurt Ratzlaff serving as principal. The school offers a badminton team and a track & field team.

High school aged students living in Linden are given the option of attending school 10 km south of Linden, in Acme, as there is no High school in the village.

Dr. Elliott School was founded in 1958 by Dr. Elliott Harvard

== See also ==
- List of communities in Alberta
- List of villages in Alberta

== Notable people ==
- Musician Mike Edel
- Legendary Poultry Farm Hand Jaxon Brown
