= Nacmine =

- Former hamlet
- Location within Town of Drumheller Location within Alberta
- Coordinates: 51.469°N 112.788°W
- Country: Canada
- Province: Alberta
- Municipality: Town of Drumheller

Government
  - Mayor: Heather Colberg
  - Governing body: Drumheller Town Council: Lisa Hansen-Zacharuk; Patrick Kolafa; Tony Lacher; Stephanie Price; Crystal Sereda; Tom Zariski
- Time zone: UTC−06:00 (Alberta Time)
- Area codes: 403, 587, 825

Nacmine is a community within the Town of Drumheller, Alberta, Canada. It was previously a hamlet within the former Municipal District (MD) of Badlands No. 7 prior to the MD's amalgamation with the former City of Drumheller on January 1, 1998.

Nacmine is located within the Red Deer River valley on South Dinosaur Trail (Highway 575), approximately 5 km (3 mi) west of Drumheller's main townsite and 112 km (70 mi) northeast of Calgary. The community is within Census Division No. 5 and in the federal riding of Crowfoot.

Population history of Nacmine
Year	Pop.	±%
1941	483	—
1951	547	+13.3%
1956	371	−32.2%
1961	285	−23.2%
1966	338	+18.6%
1971	350	+3.6%
1976	333	−4.9%
1981	389	+16.8%
1986	391	+0.5%
1991	447	+14.3%
1996	489	+9.4%
2001	513	+4.9%
Source: Statistics Canada

== See also ==
- List of communities in Alberta
