= Beiseker =

Village in Alberta, Canada

- Village
- Village of Beiseker
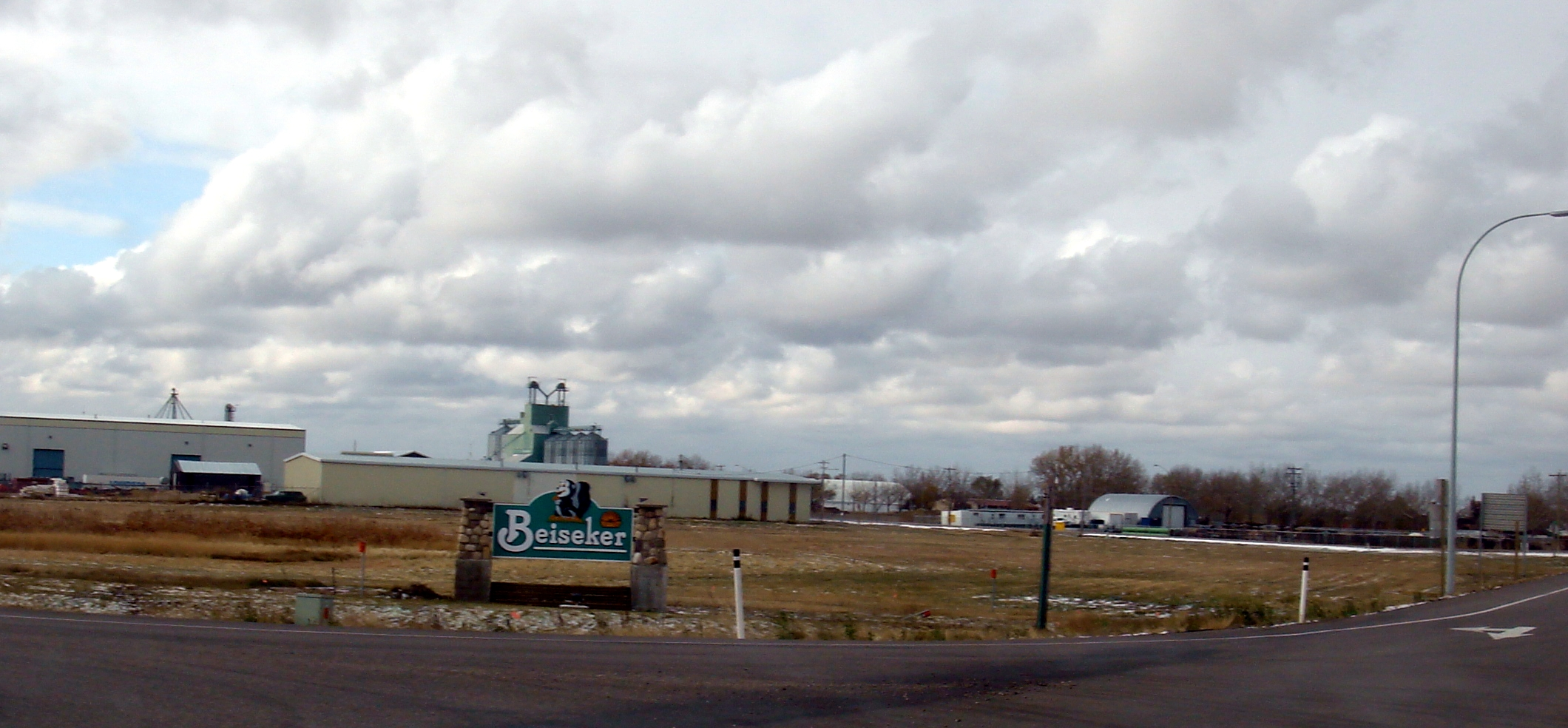
- Beiseker welcome sign, 2009
- Motto: Crossroads to the Future
- Location within Alberta
- Coordinates: 51°23′13.1″N 113°31′58.5″W
- Country: Canada
- Province: Alberta
- Region: Calgary Region
- Census division: 6
- Municipal district: Rocky View County
- Founded: 1908
- Incorporated
  - Village: February 23, 1921

Government
  - Mayor: Neil Young
  - Governing body: Beiseker Village Council
  - MP: David Bexte
  - MLA: Tara Sawyer

Area (2021)
  - Land: 2.85 km^{2} (1.10 sq mi)
- Elevation: 915 m (3,002 ft)

Population (2021)
  - Total: 754
  - Density: 264.3/km^{2} (685/sq mi)
- Demonym: Beisekerite
- Time zone: UTC−06:00 (Alberta Time)
- Postal code span: T0M 0G0
- Highways: Highway 9; Highway 72; Highway 806
- Website: Official website

Beiseker (/ˈbaɪsɪkər/) is a village in the Canadian province of Alberta, approximately 70 kilometres (43 mi) northeast of Calgary. It is an outermost part of the Calgary Region, and is included within Calgary's Census Metropolitan Area (CMA). The village is surrounded by rural Rocky View County, and the closest neighbouring communities are Irricana, Kathyrn, and Acme.

== History ==
Lying in a belt of rich black soil, Beiseker was developed as an agricultural service centre. It was founded by the Calgary Colonization Company, whose purpose was to promote settlement by demonstrating the grain-growing potential of the area. The village's name came from Thomas Lincoln Beiseker (1866-1941), a partner and vice president of the company. Initial colonization took place in 1908 when the company recruited a number of ethnic German settlers from the Great Plains of the Dakotas. This is reflected in the number of German family names which predominate the area.

The village began to grow in 1910 when the branch line of the Canadian Pacific Railway was completed. In 1910, the first general store was opened in a large two-story building which housed the school and dance hall. The Grand Trunk Pacific line - now owned by Canadian National Railway - was constructed in 1912 to the east of the central business district. Telephone arrived in 1912 and electricity in 1928. With the construction and intersection of Highways 9, 72 and 806 at the northeast edge of the village, Beiseker came to have a very favourable location in terms of road and rail access. Since it is located almost equidistant from Calgary and Drumheller, Beiseker began to emerge as a local service and trade centre for the surrounding rural agricultural area. Village status was achieved in 1921.

Beiseker-area farmers, including Jerry Leiske and Larry Hixt, repeatedly won prestigious 'Wheat King' titles at international events, including the Royal Agricultural Winter Fair in Toronto. This recognition led to Beiseker becoming called the "World Wheat King Capital", or as a top producing area of wheat.

== Infrastructure ==
Beiseker Community School is located in the village, and was first opened in 1914. It is part of the Rocky View Schools system, and teaches from kindergarten to grade 12.

The village is also home to Baptist, Catholic and Anglican congregations. As Beiseker is at the intersection of three provincial highways, and hosts a campground and motel, it is a popular stop for campers and other travelers coming to and from Saskatoon and Drumheller. There is also a small airport which serves the community, located a five kilometres east of town along Alberta Highway 9.

== Economy ==
Beiseker currently serves as a centre for local agricultural services including fertilizer, seed cleaning, and soil testing. There is a local UFA outlet, a Richardson International facility, and a Canadian Malting Co. grain elevator serving farmers in the area. Local industries serve the oilpatch, and there are many sites extracting natural gas in the immediate area surrounding Beiseker, as well as several major pipelines.

Beiseker also has a number of small businesses on its main street (6 Street) offering a variety of services, including a local credit union, grocery store, pharmacist and hair dressers, as well as several small restaurants.

The Canadian office of Lampson International, a large international company specializing in construction cranes, is based in Beiseker.

== Notable people ==
William Samuel McGee (born 1868, Lindsay, Ontario - d 1940, Beiseker) lived for several years on a farm with his wife and daughter just outside Beiseker and is buried in the area. His name was to be the inspiration for the poem The Cremation of Sam McGee by Robert W. Service.

== Arts and culture ==
Beiseker is a regular filming location in Alberta, beginning in the 1970s and 1980s. Sites east of the village stood in for Smallville in the 1978 Superman movie, and several locations in town were featured in the 1997 TV movie Seduction in a Small Town, starring Melissa Gilbert and Dennis Weaver.

Several locations in and around Beiseker were featured in the filming of Ang Lee's Academy Award-winning 2005 film Brokeback Mountain, including the site of the 'Twist Ranch' that figures importantly in the penultimate scene of the film.

In 2016, Beiseker was selected as a filming location for the third season of FX Network's show Fargo, standing in for Eden Valley, Minnesota, as well as an episode of TBS's series The Detour. In 2018, Beiseker hosted the production for the Netflix zombie horror series Black Summer. In 2019, Beiseker hosted on-location shooting for Ghostbusters: Afterlife. In 2023, Beiseker hosted productions of Wind River: The Next Chapter as well as the fifth season of the Fargo TV series.

The Beiseker Station Museum, which showcases local history and artifacts dating from the village's founding in the early 1900s, is located in the former Canadian Pacific Railway station and village offices.

The village also hosts an annual community festival, the Beiseker Country Fair, on the second Saturday in June. The festival, known for many years as Beiseker Sports Day, has been held since 1912.

== Mascot ==
In the early 1990s, the Village of Beiseker began promoting itself with the mascot, "Squirt the Skunk", which included promotional items such as pins and postcards. A "Squirt the Skunk" statue, 13 ft (4.0 m) in height, was first erected in the municipal campground near Highway 72, but later moved to Centennial Park near the village's Main Street. A "Squirt the Skunk" costume was also made, so the mascot may appear at village events.

== Demographics ==
In the 2021 Census of Population conducted by Statistics Canada, the Village of Beiseker had a population of 754 living in 314 of its 333 total private dwellings, a change of −7.9% from its 2016 population of 819. With a land area of 2.85 km^{2} (1.10 sq mi), it had a population density of 264.6/km^{2} (685.2/sq mi) in 2021.

In the 2016 Census of Population conducted by Statistics Canada, the Village of Beiseker recorded a population of 819 living in 331 of its 338 total private dwellings, a 4.3% change from its 2011 population of 785. With a land area of 2.85 km^{2} (1.10 sq mi), it had a population density of 287.4/km^{2} (744.3/sq mi) in 2016.

== See also ==
- List of communities in Alberta
- List of villages in Alberta
