= Munson, Alberta =

Munson
- Village
- Village of Munson
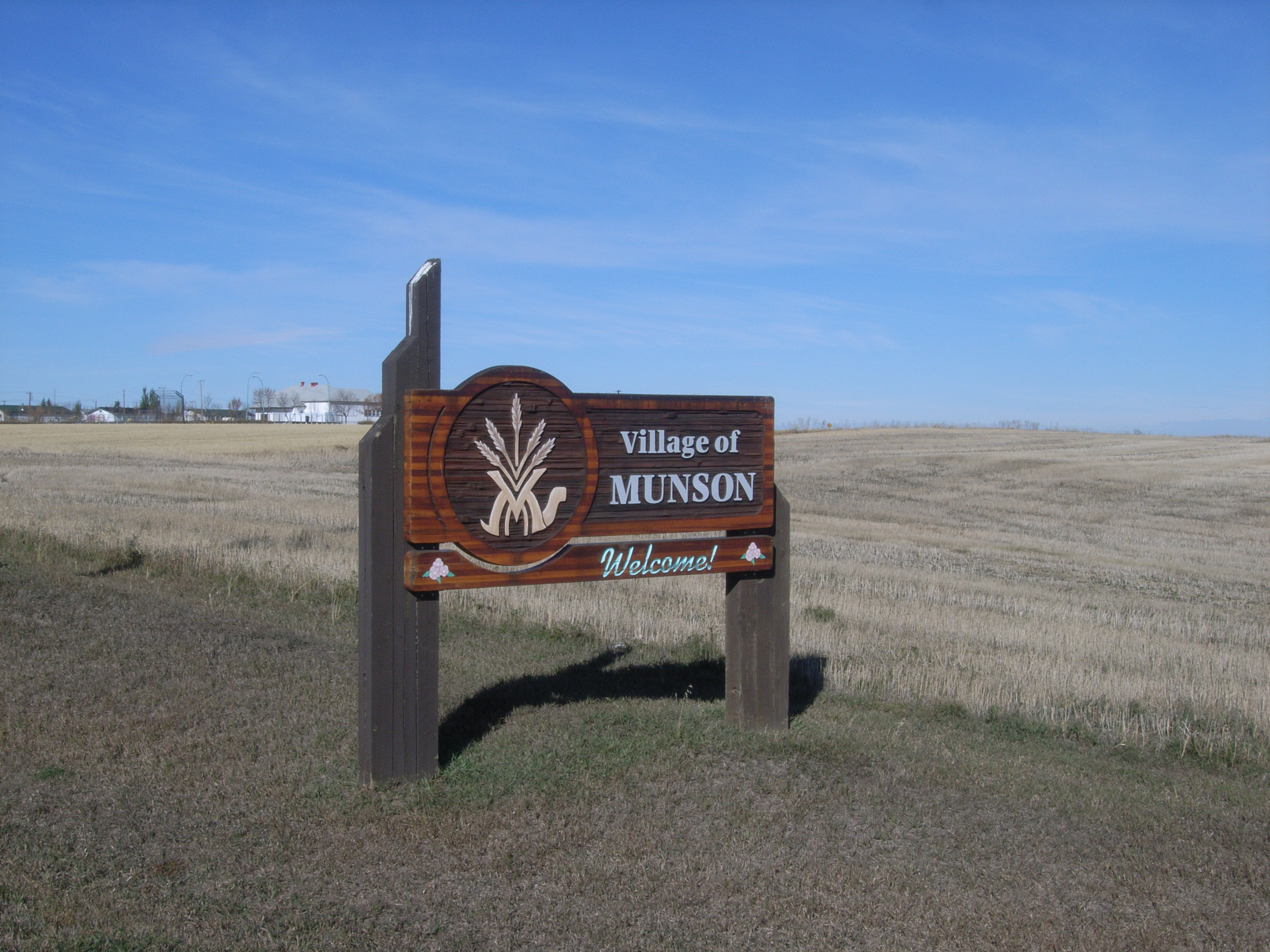

- Location within Alberta
- Coordinates: 51°33′47″N 112°44′30″W
- Country: Canada
- Province: Alberta
- Region: Central Alberta
- Census Division: No. 5
- Municipal district: Starland County
- Incorporated
  - Village: May 5, 1911

Government
  - Mayor: Mary Taylor
  - Governing body: Munson Village Council

Area (2021)
  - Land: 2.56 km^{2} (0.99 sq mi)
- Elevation: 825 m (2,707 ft)

Population (2021)
  - Total: 170
  - Density: 66.3/km^{2} (172/sq mi)
- Time zone: UTC−06:00 (Alberta Time)
- Highways: 9

Munson is a village in central Alberta, Canada. It is located 13 km north of the Town of Drumheller along Highway 9 and the Canadian National Railway tracks.

== History ==
Prior to the end of World War I, Munson was the site of a Ukrainian Canadian internment camp where non-citizen immigrant prisoners laboured on the railway. The camp, which remained open until March 21, 1919, consisted of shelters made of railway cars.

== Demographics ==
In the 2021 Census of Population conducted by Statistics Canada, the Village of Munson had a population of 170 living in 74 of its 82 total private dwellings, a change of −11.5% from its 2016 population of 192. With a land area of 2.56 km^{2} (0.99 sq mi), it had a population density of 66.4/km^{2} (172.0/sq mi) in 2021.

In the 2016 Census of Population conducted by Statistics Canada, the Village of Munson recorded a population of 192 living in 82 of its 89 total private dwellings, a −5.9% change from its 2011 population of 204. With a land area of 2.53 km^{2} (0.98 sq mi), it had a population density of 75.9/km^{2} (196.6/sq mi) in 2016.

== See also ==
- List of communities in Alberta
- List of francophone communities in Alberta
- List of villages in Alberta
