= Acme, Alberta =

Acme
- Village
- Village of Acme
- Flag
- Nickname: The Rural Recreational Capital of Alberta
- Location within Kneehill County

- Location within Alberta
- Coordinates: 51°29′59″N 113°29′53″W
- Country: Canada
- Province: Alberta
- Region: Southern Alberta
- Census division: 5
- Municipal district: Kneehill County
- Founded: 1909
- Incorporated
  - Village: July 7, 1910

Government
  - Mayor: Jason Bates
  - Governing body: Acme Village Council

Area (2021)
  - Land: 2.49 km^{2} (0.96 sq mi)
- Elevation: 905 m (2,969 ft)

Population (2021)
  - Total: 606
  - Density: 243.7/km^{2} (631/sq mi)
- Time zone: UTC−06:00 (Alberta Time)
- Postal Code: T0M 0A0
- Highways: Highway 575; Highway 806
- Website: Official website

Acme /ˈækmiː/ is a village in south-central Alberta, Canada. It is located 83 kilometres (52 mi) northeast of Calgary. It was the first village to be incorporated in Kneehill County.

The name Acme is derived from the village's railway heritage. When the Canadian Pacific Railway reached the area in 1909, the village's station became the most northernly stop on the company's network. The moniker Acme (of Greek origin, meaning 'the highest point') was thus applied to the community by CPR surveyors of the day. The first train arrived July 7, 1910, and the village was incorporated that day as well.

== Demographics ==
In the 2021 Census of Population conducted by Statistics Canada, the Village of Acme had a population of 606 living in 272 of its 294 total private dwellings, a change of −7.2% from its 2016 population of 653. With a land area of 2.49 km^{2} (0.96 sq mi), it had a population density of 243.4/km^{2} (630.3/sq mi) in 2021.

In the 2016 Census of Population conducted by Statistics Canada, the Village of Acme recorded a population of 653 living in 281 of its 301 total private dwellings, which represents no change from its 2011 population of 653. With a land area of 2.48 km^{2} (0.96 sq mi), it had a population density of 263.3/km^{2} (682.0/sq mi) in 2016.

== Economy ==
The primary industries in the Acme area are agriculture, including livestock and grain farming, and oil and natural gas. Trucking also plays a significant role in the local economy, mostly supporting the agriculture industry.

== Culture ==
Cultural facilities within Acme include the Acme Municipal Library and the Acme Community Centre. The community centre replaced the village's Memorial Hall that was lost to fire in 2004.

== Attractions ==
Acme is home to a campground, curling rink, golf course, outdoor pool, outdoor skating rink, beach volleyball pit, soccer field, three ball diamonds, numerous parks, and a senior centre. Squash, racquetball, and wallyball courts are located in a building attached to Acme School.

== Education ==
Acme School, operated by Golden Hills Regional Division No. 75, serves students in kindergarten through grade 6 and students in grades 10 through 12. Students in grades 7 through 9 attend Dr. Elliott Community School in nearby Linden. Acme School's high school sports teams are nicknamed the Acme Reds.

== Clubs and organizations ==
Acme has a variety of local clubs and societies, including a Royal Canadian Legion branch, a senior association, an Elks of Canada club, a Masonic Lodge, and a variety of other organizations, including multiple church groups.

== Climate ==
Climate data for Acme
Month	Jan	Feb	Mar	Apr	May	Jun	Jul	Aug	Sep	Oct	Nov	Dec	Year
Record high °C (°F)	13.9 (57.0)	16.1 (61.0)	23.9 (75.0)	30.0 (86.0)	30.6 (87.1)	34.4 (93.9)	36.5 (97.7)	36.1 (97.0)	36.7 (98.1)	31.0 (87.8)	23.3 (73.9)	14.4 (57.9)	36.7 (98.1)
Mean daily maximum °C (°F)	−8.7 (16.3)	−3.6 (25.5)	1.4 (34.5)	10.7 (51.3)	17.5 (63.5)	21.7 (71.1)	24.3 (75.7)	24.1 (75.4)	18.4 (65.1)	13.0 (55.4)	2.1 (35.8)	−5.4 (22.3)	9.6 (49.3)
Daily mean °C (°F)	−13.9 (7.0)	−9 (16)	−4.2 (24.4)	4.0 (39.2)	10.3 (50.5)	14.6 (58.3)	16.8 (62.2)	16.2 (61.2)	11.1 (52.0)	5.7 (42.3)	−3.7 (25.3)	−10.7 (12.7)	3.1 (37.6)
Mean daily minimum °C (°F)	−19.2 (−2.6)	−14.5 (5.9)	−10 (14)	−2.8 (27.0)	3.0 (37.4)	7.4 (45.3)	9.3 (48.7)	8.3 (46.9)	3.7 (38.7)	−1.6 (29.1)	−9.6 (14.7)	−16.2 (2.8)	−3.5 (25.7)
Record low °C (°F)	−43.3 (−45.9)	−37.8 (−36.0)	−35 (−31)	−21.1 (−6.0)	−10 (14)	−2.8 (27.0)	−0.6 (30.9)	−1.5 (29.3)	−8.3 (17.1)	−20.6 (−5.1)	−32.8 (−27.0)	−42 (−44)	−43.3 (−45.9)
Average precipitation mm (inches)	—	—	22.3 (0.88)	28.3 (1.11)	54.3 (2.14)	69.4 (2.73)	59 (2.3)	—	45.3 (1.78)	18 (0.7)	22.9 (0.90)	—	—
Average rainfall mm (inches)	—	0.0 (0.0)	1.5 (0.06)	15.1 (0.59)	52.7 (2.07)	69.4 (2.73)	59.0 (2.32)	—	42.0 (1.65)	10.0 (0.39)	1.6 (0.06)	0.3 (0.01)	—
Average snowfall cm (inches)	—	—	20.8 (8.2)	13.1 (5.2)	1.6 (0.6)	0.0 (0.0)	0.0 (0.0)	0.0 (0.0)	3.3 (1.3)	8.0 (3.1)	21.3 (8.4)	—	—

== Notable people ==
- Honourable Helen Hunley – first female Lieutenant Governor of Alberta
- Constance Elaine "Connie" Osterman, Canadian politician, Progressive Conservative MLA and cabinet minister (1979–1992)

== See also ==
- List of communities in Alberta
- List of villages in Alberta
