= Stettler, Alberta =

Stettler
- Town
- Town of Stettler
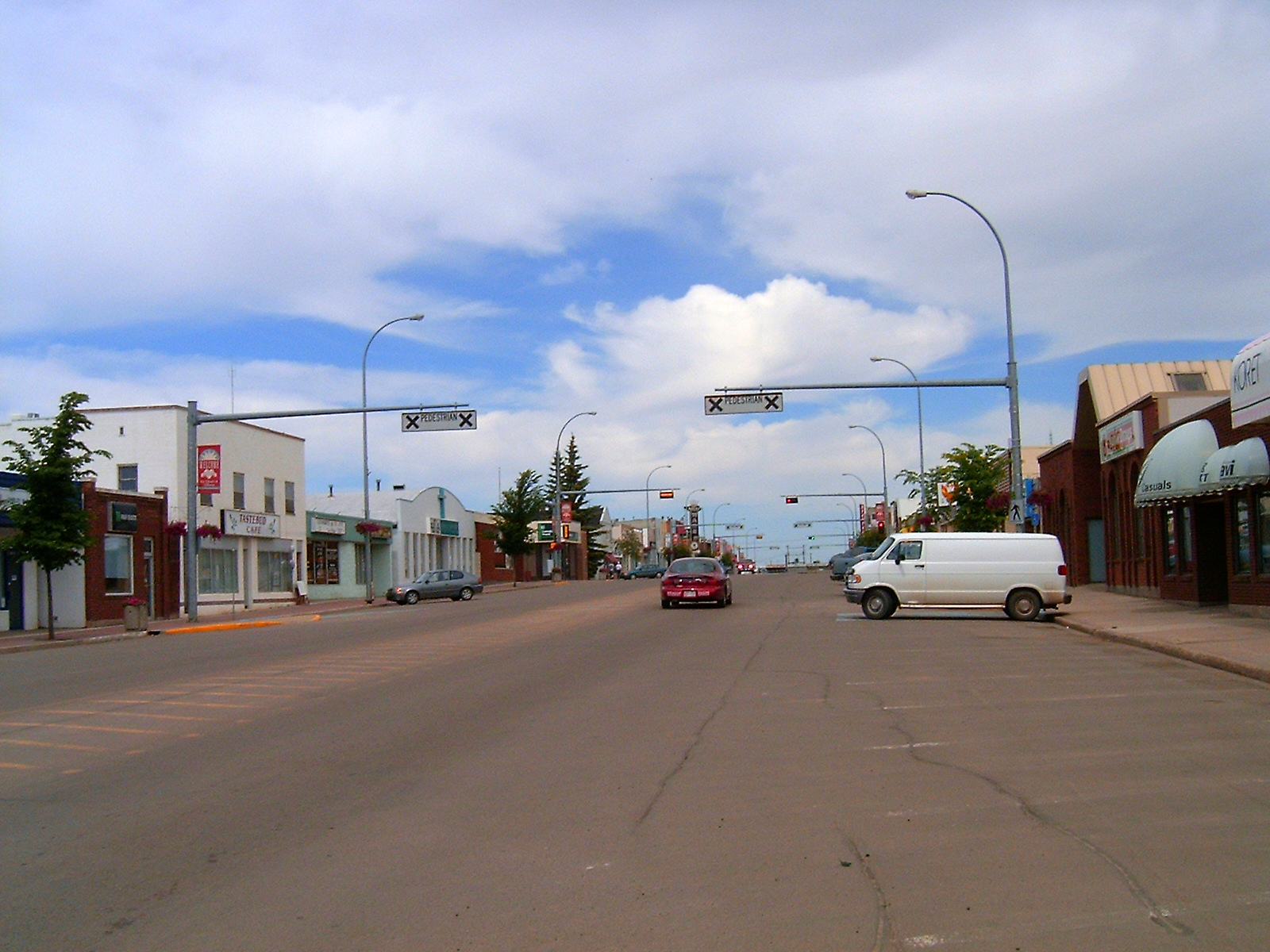
- Main Street, Stettler
- Nickname: The Heart of Alberta
- Location within the County of Stettler Location within Alberta
- Coordinates: 52°19′25″N 112°43′09″W
- Country: Canada
- Province: Alberta
- Region: Central Alberta
- Incorporated
  - Village: June 30, 1906
  - Town: November 23, 1906

Government
  - Mayor: Gord Lawlor
  - Governing body: Stettler Town Council

Area (2021)
  - Land: 13.19 km^{2} (5.09 sq mi)
- Elevation: 820 m (2,690 ft)

Population (2021)
  - Total: 5,695
  - Density: 431.9/km^{2} (1,119/sq mi)
- Time zone: UTC−06:00 (Alberta Time)
- Postal code span: T4K & T0C 2L0 to 2L2
- Area codes: 403, 587
- Highways: Highway 12; Highway 56
- Waterway: Redwillow Creek
- Website: www.stettler.net

Stettler is a town in east-central Alberta, Canada, that is surrounded by the County of Stettler No. 6.

== History ==
Stettler was founded in 1905 and was named after Swiss immigrant Carl Stettler, who also founded a settlement east of the town at Blumenau, as well as being influential in the nearby community of Castor. He also served on the first Town Council of Stettler.

Stettler was the site of the worst mass murders in Alberta history in 1959, when Robert Raymond Cook killed his father, stepmother, and their five children. The crime also led to the last execution in Alberta, when Cook was hanged in 1960.

== Geography ==
=== Climate ===
Stettler experiences a humid continental climate (Köppen climate classification Dfb).

Climate data for Stettler
Month	Jan	Feb	Mar	Apr	May	Jun	Jul	Aug	Sep	Oct	Nov	Dec	Year
Record high °C (°F)	10 (50)	15 (59)	20 (68)	29 (84)	33.5 (92.3)	33.5 (92.3)	34.5 (94.1)	36 (97)	35 (95)	29.5 (85.1)	21 (70)	14 (57)	36 (97)
Mean daily maximum °C (°F)	−7.2 (19.0)	−3.7 (25.3)	2.3 (36.1)	11.4 (52.5)	17.3 (63.1)	20.8 (69.4)	23 (73)	22.5 (72.5)	17.5 (63.5)	11.4 (52.5)	0.1 (32.2)	−5.5 (22.1)	9.2 (48.6)
Daily mean °C (°F)	−12.6 (9.3)	−9.5 (14.9)	−3.3 (26.1)	4.7 (40.5)	10.4 (50.7)	14.3 (57.7)	16.4 (61.5)	15.5 (59.9)	10.7 (51.3)	4.8 (40.6)	−5 (23)	−10.6 (12.9)	3 (37)
Mean daily minimum °C (°F)	−18.1 (−0.6)	−15.2 (4.6)	−8.8 (16.2)	−2 (28)	3.5 (38.3)	7.8 (46.0)	9.8 (49.6)	8.5 (47.3)	3.9 (39.0)	−1.8 (28.8)	−10 (14)	−15.6 (3.9)	−3.2 (26.2)
Record low °C (°F)	−45 (−49)	−42 (−44)	−32 (−26)	−27 (−17)	−8.5 (16.7)	−1.5 (29.3)	1 (34)	−3 (27)	−11 (12)	−25 (−13)	−34 (−29)	−45 (−49)	−45 (−49)
Average precipitation mm (inches)	21.5 (0.85)	13.8 (0.54)	21.4 (0.84)	23.3 (0.92)	54.5 (2.15)	87.1 (3.43)	88.3 (3.48)	64.2 (2.53)	50.9 (2.00)	20.7 (0.81)	17.4 (0.69)	18.1 (0.71)	481.1 (18.94)
Source: Environment Canada

== Demographics ==
Population history
Year	Pop.	±%
2001	5,125	—
2006	5,445	+6.2%
2011	5,748	+5.6%
2016	5,952	+3.5%
2021	5,695	−4.3%
Source: Statistics Canada

In the 2021 Census of Population conducted by Statistics Canada, the Town of Stettler had a population of 5,695 living in 2,384 of its 2,574 total private dwellings, a change of −4.3% from its 2016 population of 5,952. With a land area of 13.19 km^{2} (5.09 sq mi), it had a population density of 431.8/km^{2} (1,118.3/sq mi) in 2021.

In the 2016 Census of Population conducted by Statistics Canada, the Town of Stettler recorded a population of 5,952 living in 2,415 of its 2,607 total private dwellings, a 3.5% change from its 2011 population of 5,748. With a land area of 13.14 km^{2} (5.07 sq mi), it had a population density of 453.0/km^{2} (1,173.2/sq mi) in 2016.

The population of the Town of Stettler according to its 2008 municipal census is 5,843.

The median household income in 2005 for Stettler was $56,201, which is below the Alberta provincial average of $63,988.

== Attractions ==
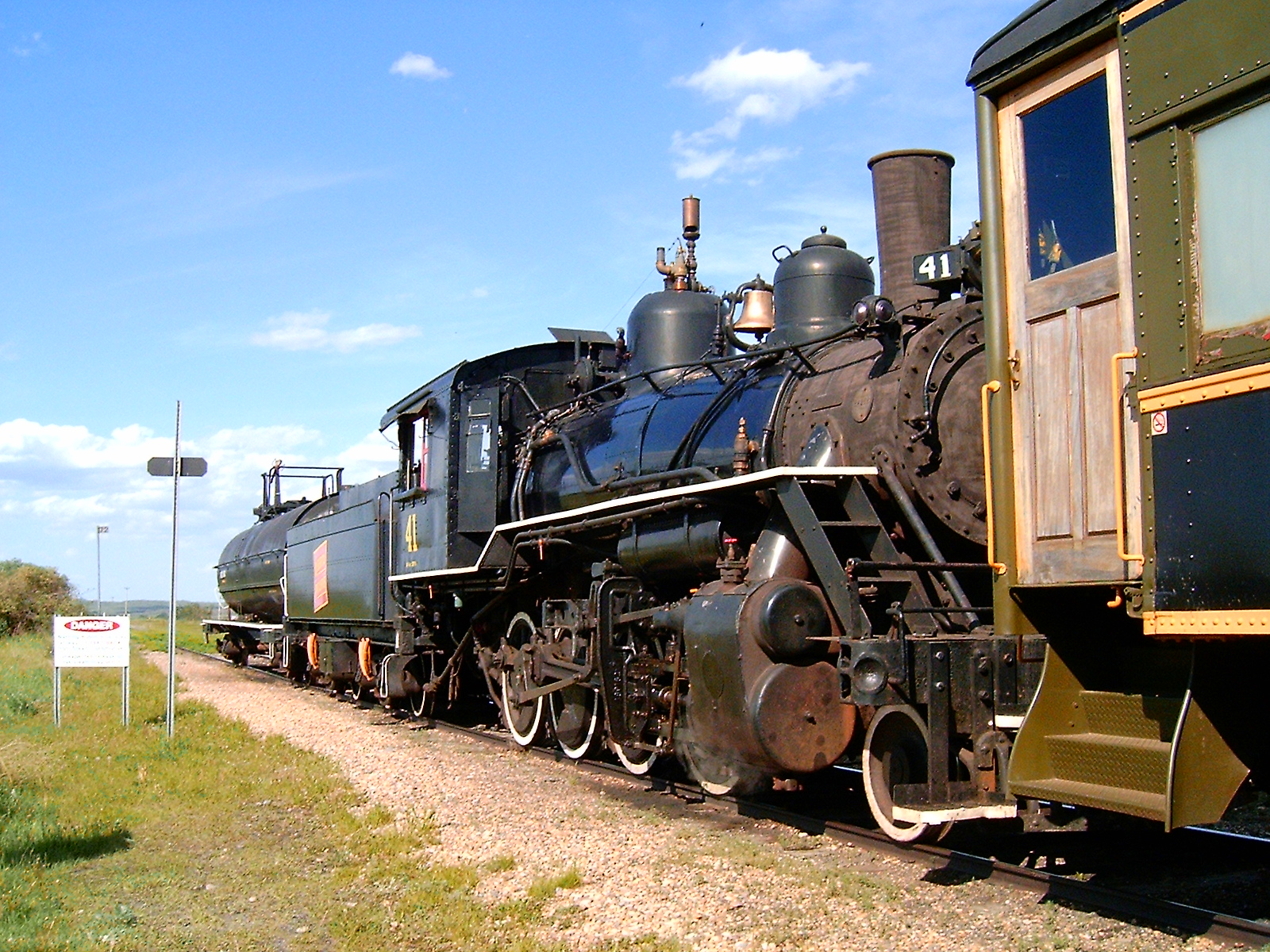
Alberta Prairie Railway, engine 41

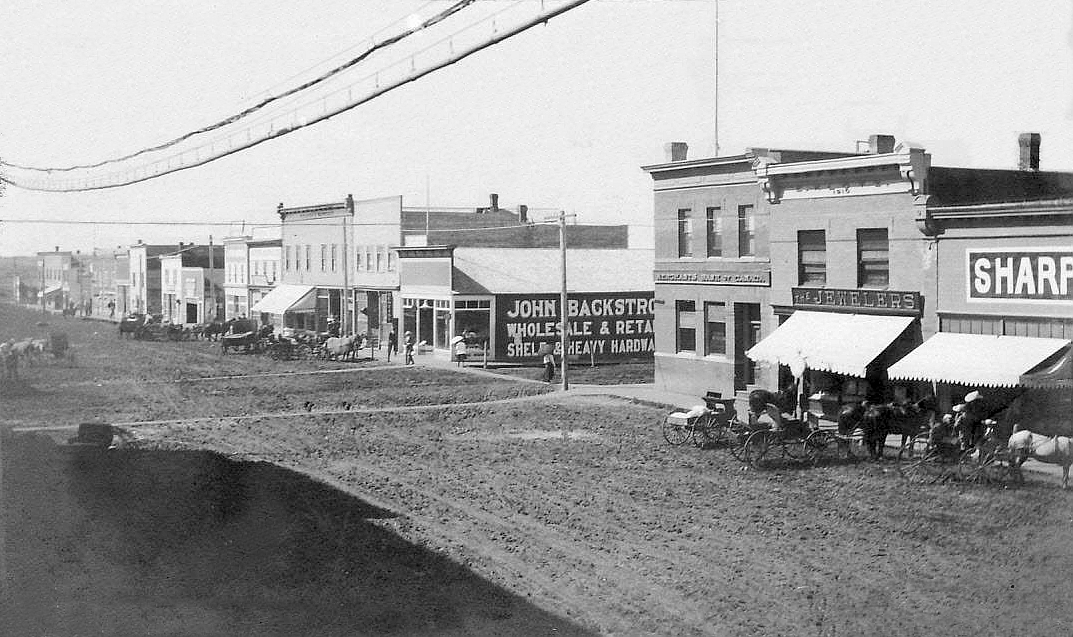
Stettler, circa 1900

Alberta Prairie Railway Excursions is in Stettler, offering rail tours on a line from Stettler to Big Valley, a 35 km (22 mi), one-hour trip.

In addition, Stettler has a historic Parrish & Heimbecker grain elevator overlooking the railway tracks. One of the last elevators in Alberta and the only survivor of the three elevators that previously operated in Stettler. It operates as a museum and also houses a 1887 Heeber and Son's Little Giant threshing machine, a 1912 International Harvester hit-and-miss engine called the Beast and a 1940s Ford tractor called Mickey Mouse. All run (including the elevator's "leg") and in 2016 the Little Giant travelled to Winnipeg and joined more than 150 other threshing machines that claimed a Guinness World Records record for the most threshing machines operating simultaneously. The Little Giant had the distinction of being the oldest one there and possibly may be one of the oldest still working threshing machines.

There is also a county museum featuring the original town train station which was moved and other historic buildings.

The Jewel Theatre was built in 1952. The movie theatre was renovated in 2021 to become a 200-seat theatre.

== Government ==
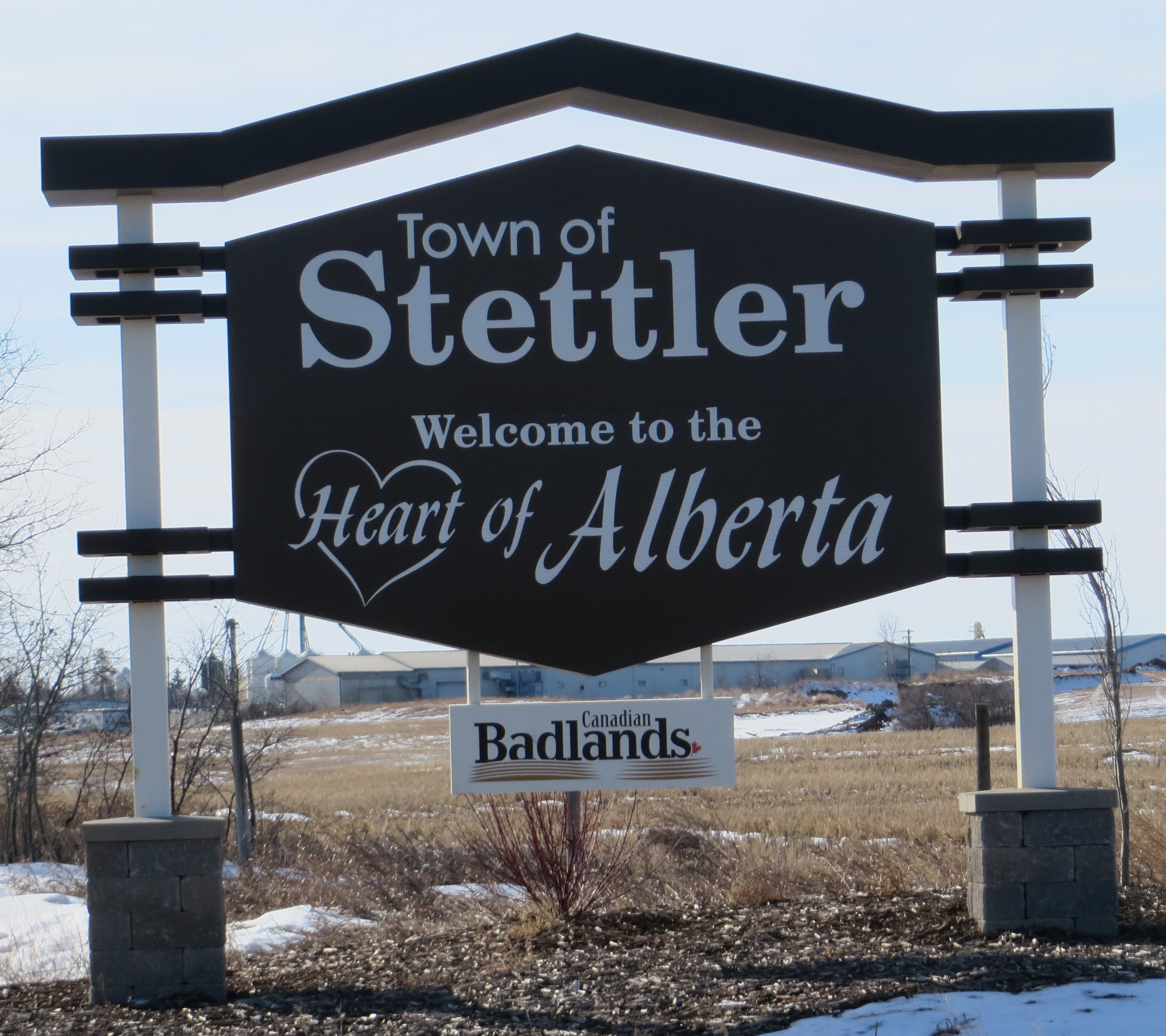
Stettler welcome sign

As of 2022, the mayor is Sean Nolls, and the councillors are Cheryl Barros, Kurt Baker, Travis Randell, Gord Lawlor, Scott Pfeiffer, and Wayne Smith.

== Education ==
The town has two schools in the Clearview Public Schools school district: Stettler Elementary School, and William E. Hay Stettler Secondary Campus.

Christ King Catholic School is part of the East Central Catholic School Division.

== Notable people ==
- Kenn Borek — founder of Kenn Borek Air
- Robert Raymond Cook — "last man to be hanged in Alberta" after being convicted of the 1959 murder of his family
- Bob Falkenberg — retired professional hockey player
- Marie Jean Laing — Canadian politician, NDP MLA (1986–1993)
- Brian Ogilvie — retired professional hockey player
- Chester Reynolds — Social Credit Party politician in the Alberta provincial government and grandfather to actor Ryan Reynolds

== See also ==
- List of communities in Alberta
- List of towns in Alberta
