= Carbon, Alberta =

Carbon
- Village
- Village of Carbon
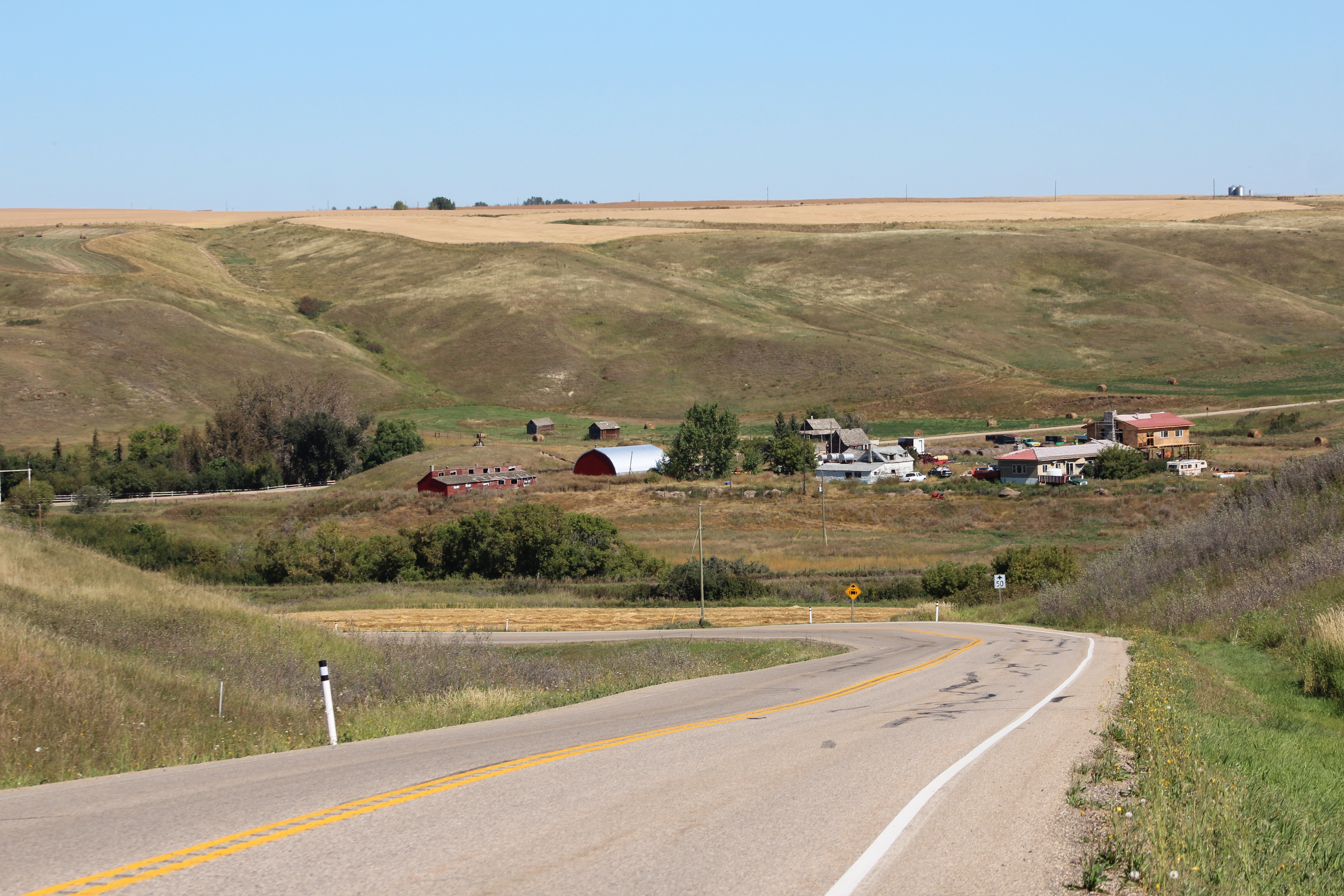

- Location in Alberta
- Coordinates: 51°29′19.7″N 113°09′14.0″W
- Country: Canada
- Province: Alberta
- Region: Central Alberta
- Census division: 5
- Municipal district: Kneehill County
- Incorporated
  - Village: November 18, 1912

Government
  - Mayor: Bryan Peever
  - Governing body: Carbon Village Council

Area (2021)
  - Land: 1.99 km^{2} (0.77 sq mi)

Population (2021)
  - Total: 492
  - Density: 246.8/km^{2} (639/sq mi)
- Time zone: UTC−06:00 (Alberta Time)
- Postal code span: T0M 0L0
- Area code: +1-403
- Highways: Highway 575; Highway 836
- Waterway: Kneehill Creek
- Website: www.villageofcarbon.com

Carbon is a village in central Alberta, Canada.

It is located in Kneehill County, 41 kilometres (25 mi) west of Drumheller and 120 kilometres (75 mi) northeast of Calgary, along Highway 836, 7 kilometres (4.3 mi) each of Highway 21 on Highway 575. Built at the beginning of the 20th century in the Kneehill Creek Valley, Carbon is a village with paved, quiet streets lined with trees.

== History ==
The Carbon district has a colourful and interesting history. Ranching, farming and coal mining were the major activities of the early settlers. The name Carbon was suggested by L.D. Elliot, an area rancher, and was adopted for the new post office opened on October 1, 1904. The village was incorporated in 1912.

Carbon had a railroad running through it which has since been removed. This railroad is on the south side of the Kneehill Creek. On both sides of the village (west/east) you can still see this railroad flying over (2016). This railroad was operated by CP rail. Glenbow museum in Calgary has photos of this railroad under construction on file. This railroad was primarily used to support the coal mining in the area.

== Demographics ==
In the 2021 Census of Population conducted by Statistics Canada, the Village of Carbon had a population of 492 living in 222 of its 240 total private dwellings, a change of 8.4% from its 2016 population of 454. With a land area of 1.99 km^{2} (0.77 sq mi), it had a population density of 247.2/km^{2} (640.3/sq mi) in 2021.

The population of the Village of Carbon according to its 2017 municipal census is 500.

In the 2016 Census of Population conducted by Statistics Canada, the Village of Carbon recorded a population of 500 living in 199 of its 222 total private dwellings, a −23.3% change from its 2011 population of 592. With a land area of 1.99 km^{2} (0.77 sq mi), it had a population density of 228.1/km^{2} (590.9/sq mi) in 2016.

== Facilities and amenities ==
The village also features a K-9 school, swimming pool, museum and art gallery, curling rink, and two campgrounds. Maintained walking paths are also available year-round following the creek through the valley.

== Notable people ==
- Archie Gouldie, professional wrestler better known by his ring name Mongolian Stomper

== See also ==
- List of communities in Alberta
- List of villages in Alberta
- List of francophone communities in Alberta
- Archie Gouldie
