= Starland County =

Municipal district in Alberta, Canada

- Municipal district
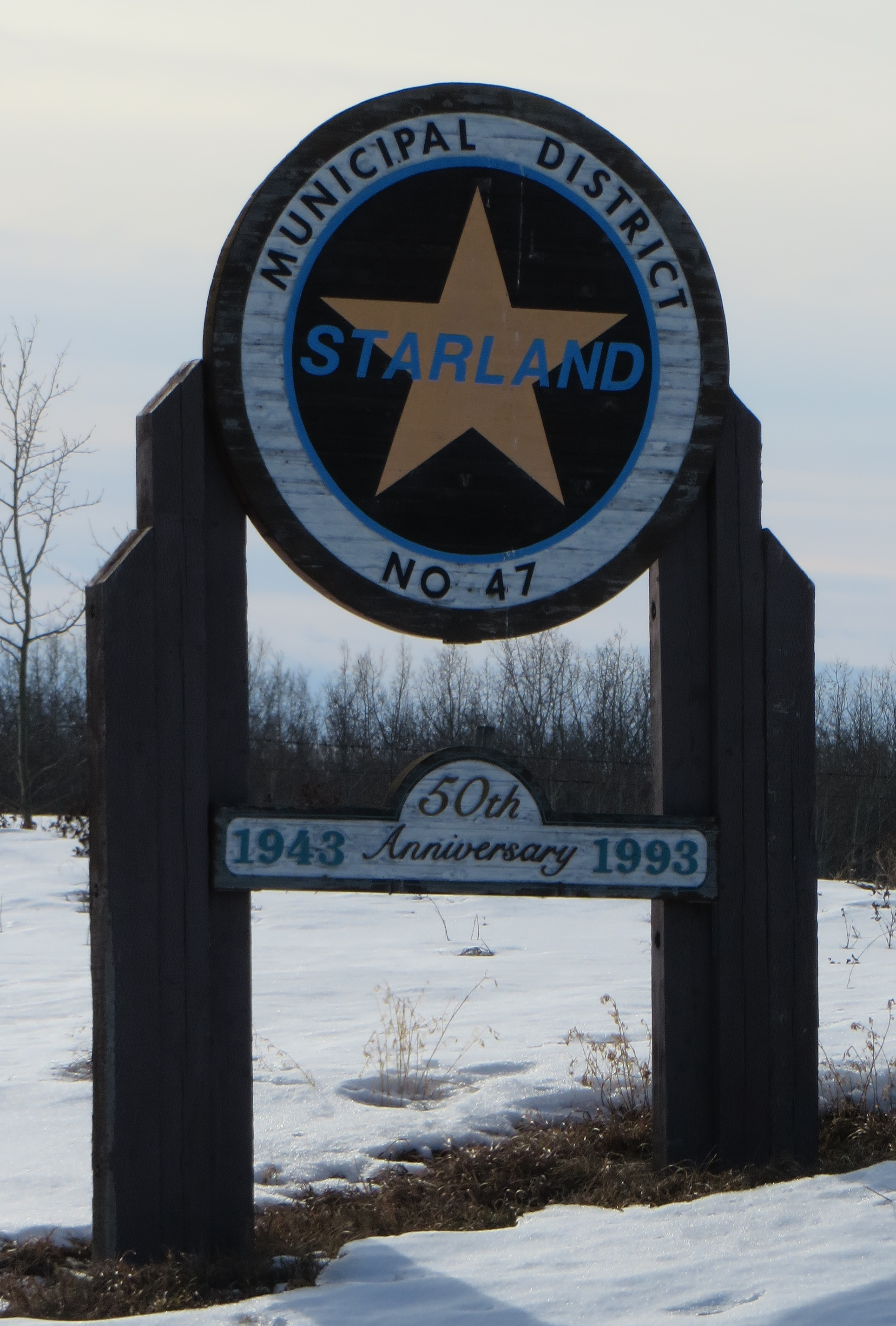
- Welcome sign

- Location within Alberta
- Country: Canada
- Province: Alberta
- Region: Red Deer
- Federal riding: Battle River—Crowfoot
- Established: 1943
- Incorporated: 1912
- 1998 (name change)

Government
  - Reeve: Steve Wannstrom
  - Governing body: Starland County Council
  - Administrative office: Morrin

Area (2021)
  - Land: 2,540.85 km^{2} (981.03 sq mi)

Population (2021)
  - Total: 1,821
  - Density: 0.7/km^{2} (1.8/sq mi)
- Time zone: UTC−06:00 (Alberta Time)
- Website: starlandcounty.com

Starland County is a municipal district located in southern Alberta, Canada.

== History ==
The municipality was incorporated in 1912, and established in the current boundaries in 1943, under the name Municipal District of Morrin No. 277. The name was changed the same year to Municipal District of Starland No. 277. Its name was changed again to Starland County in 1998.

== Geography ==
=== Communities and localities ===
The following urban municipalities are surrounded by Starland County.

Cities

- none

Towns

- none

Villages

- Delia
- Morrin (location of municipal office)
- Munson

Summer villages

- none

The following hamlets are located within Starland County.

Hamlets

- Craigmyle
- Michichi
- Rowley
- Rumsey (dissolved from village status in 1995)

The following localities are located within Starland County.

Localities

- Dinosaur
- Dowling Lake
- Gartly
- Rainbow

- Stonelaw
- Verdant Valley
- Victor

== Demographics ==
In the 2021 Census of Population conducted by Statistics Canada, Starland County had a population of 1,821 living in 588 of its 679 total private dwellings, a change of −11.9% from its 2016 population of 2,066. With a land area of 2,540.85 km^{2} (981.03 sq mi), it had a population density of 0.7/km^{2} (1.9/sq mi) in 2021.

In the 2016 Census of Population conducted by Statistics Canada, Starland County had a population of 2,066 living in 611 of its 693 total private dwellings, a 0.4% change from its 2011 population of 2,057. With a land area of 2,559.95 km^{2} (988.40 sq mi), it had a population density of 0.8/km^{2} (2.1/sq mi) in 2016.

Starland County's 2013 municipal census counted a population of 2,071.

== Attractions ==
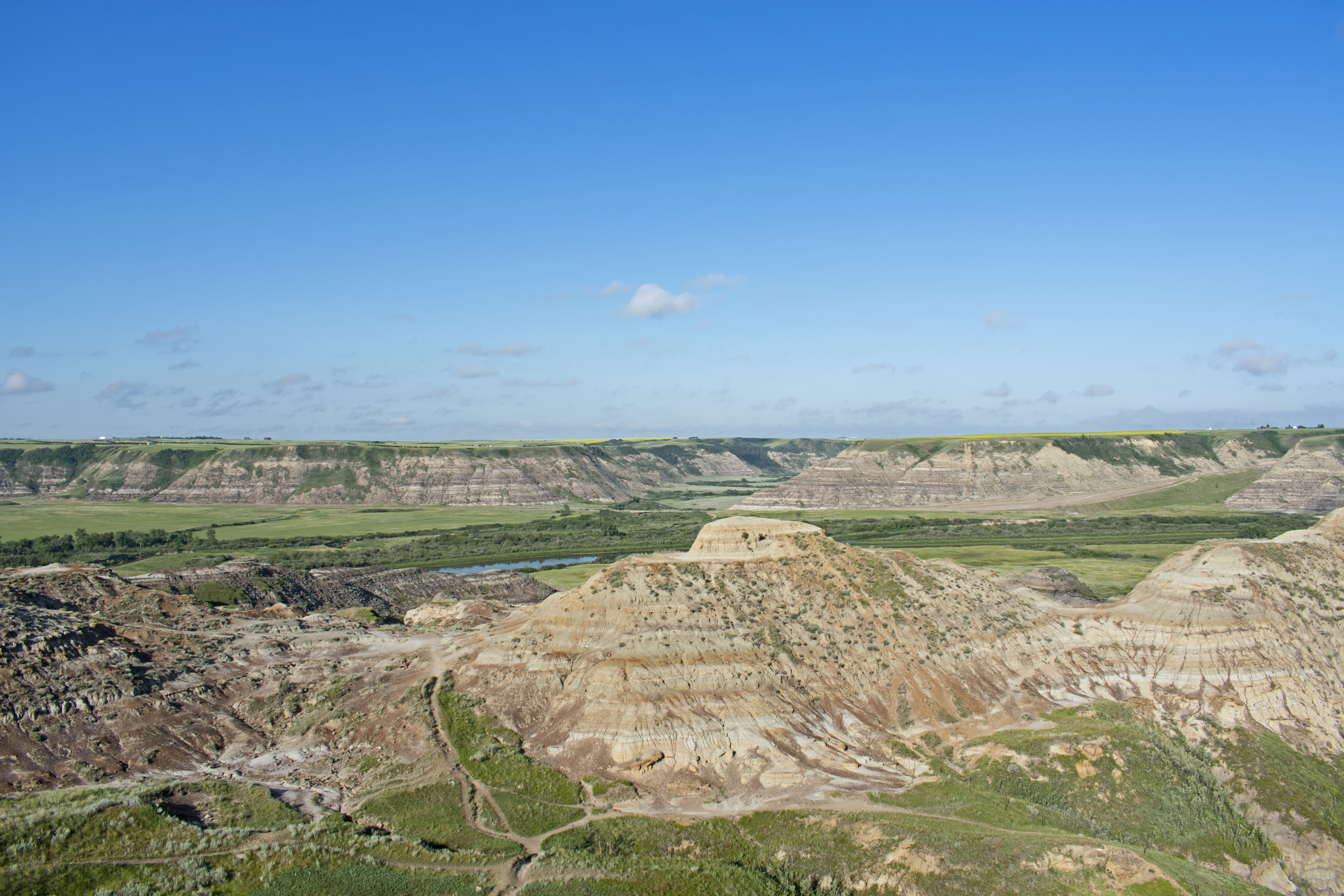
Horsethief Canyon and the Red Deer River

- McLaren Dam Recreation Area
- Michichi Dam Recreation Area
- Starland Recreation Area
- Rowley Historical Town

== See also ==
- List of communities in Alberta
- List of municipal districts in Alberta
