= Alberta Highway 2A =

Highway in Alberta, Canada

Highway 2A
- Highway 2A highlighted in red

Route information
- Auxiliary route of Highway 2
- Maintained by the Ministry of Transportation and Economic Corridors

Southern Alberta segment
- Length: 41 km (25 mi)
- South end: Highway 543 in High River
- Major intersections: Highway 7 at Okotoks
- North end: Highway 201 in Calgary

Central Alberta segment
- Length: 229 km (142 mi)
- South end: Highway 2 / Highway 72 near Crossfield
- Major intersections: Highway 27 in Olds; Highway 42 in Penhold; Highway 2 in Red Deer; Highway 11 in Red Deer; Highway 11A in Red Deer; Highway 12 in Lacombe; Highway 53 in Ponoka; Highway 13 in Wetaskiwin
- North end: Highway 2 in Leduc

Northern Alberta segments
- Length: 38 km (24 mi) High Prairie 27 km (17 mi); Grimshaw 11 km (7 mi)

Location
- Country: Canada
- Province: Alberta
- Specialized and rural municipalities: Foothills County, Rocky View County, Mountain View County, Red Deer County, Lacombe County, Ponoka County, Wetaskiwin No. 10 County, Leduc County, Lesser Slave River No. 124 M.D., Big Lakes County, Smoky River No. 130 M.D., Peace No. 135 M.D.
- Major cities: Calgary, Red Deer, Lacombe, Wetaskiwin, Leduc
- Towns: High River, Okotoks, Crossfield, Carstairs, Olds, Bowden, Innisfail, Penhold, Blackfalds, Ponoka, Millet, Grimshaw

Highway system
- Alberta Numbered Highway Network; List; Former
← Highway 2	→ Highway 3

Highway 2A is the designation of six alternate routes off Highway 2 in Alberta, Canada. In general, these are original sections of Highway 2, such as the southern portion of Macleod Trail in Calgary. They passed through communities before limited-access freeways were built to shorten driving distance, accommodate heavier volumes and to bypass city traffic. Portions of the alignment of Highway 2A follow the route of the former Calgary and Edmonton Trail, a historic overland route that predates the province of Alberta itself.

The six segments of Highway 2A span three broad regions of the province. The southernmost runs 41 km (25 mi) from High River north to Calgary as Macleod Trail. The Central Alberta segment, the longest at 229 km (142 mi), runs in two sub-sections from near Crossfield to Leduc, passing through Red Deer and several smaller communities along the way. The three northern segments—at Smith, near High Prairie, and at Grimshaw—together cover 53 km (33 mi) in the Peace River Country and Lesser Slave Lake region.

== History ==
The Central Alberta segment of Highway 2A was, until the early 1960s, the primary route between Calgary and Edmonton. Much of that alignment in turn follows the older Calgary and Edmonton Trail, a trade route in use by Indigenous peoples long before European settlement and traveled by explorer David Thompson in 1800. The more developed overland trail was blazed by John McDougall in 1873 and extended to Calgary by 1875; mail service between Calgary and Edmonton began operating over the route in July 1883.

By the late 1950s, the two-lane highway through communities such as Carstairs, Olds, the centre of Red Deer, Blackfalds, Ponoka, and Wetaskiwin was inadequate for growing traffic. Plans for a new four-lane divided highway bypassing most of those communities were developed and the bypass of Red Deer and Lacombe was announced by minister Gordon Taylor on September 15, 1960, at a meeting in Red Deer. The new route veered west of the existing road to cross the Red Deer and Blindman Rivers before rejoining it north of Lacombe; the routing surprised local residents, who had expected the bypass to pass east of the city. The former two-lane route had been carrying 5,000 vehicles per day. The bypass opened on November 21, 1962, and the former route through Red Deer was redesignated as Highway 2A.

In Calgary, Highway 2A was established along Barlow Trail in 1971 when Highway 2 was realigned onto the newly constructed Blackfoot Trail freeway (later renamed Deerfoot Trail). The Barlow Trail designation of Highway 2A was phased out in the mid-1980s, after a portion of the road was closed to allow for runway expansion at Calgary International Airport.

In northern Alberta, the segment near High Prairie was previously signed as part of Highway 2 and was renumbered as Highway 2A in 1990 at the same time that Highway 34 was renumbered to Highway 43 north of Valleyview.

== High River – Calgary ==
Highway 2A currently begins in the Town of High River and follows 12 Avenue SE and Centre Street before passing by Aldersyde and intersecting Highway 7. The highway then travels westward to the Town of Okotoks, where it branches north and follows Southridge Drive and Northridge Drive through Okotoks before rejoining Highway 2 near De Winton. In 2003, it was extended north by sharing a common alignment with Highway 2 for 3 km (2 mi) until it splits to Deerfoot Trail (Highway 2) and Macleod Trail (Highway 2A), ending in the City of Calgary at Stoney Trail (Highway 201). Macleod Trail continues north into downtown Calgary but does not carry a highway designation.

Macleod Trail takes its name from its destination to the south, Fort Macleod, a town named for James Macleod of the North-West Mounted Police. The road's origins as a trail connecting Calgary to Fort Macleod long predate the highway designation. South of Calgary, Highway 2A follows what was the old two-lane Highway 2 alignment through the communities of the Foothills County before the divided expressway was constructed to the east. The portion between De Winton and Stoney Trail in Calgary follows Macleod Trail through suburban south Calgary and carries substantial local traffic.

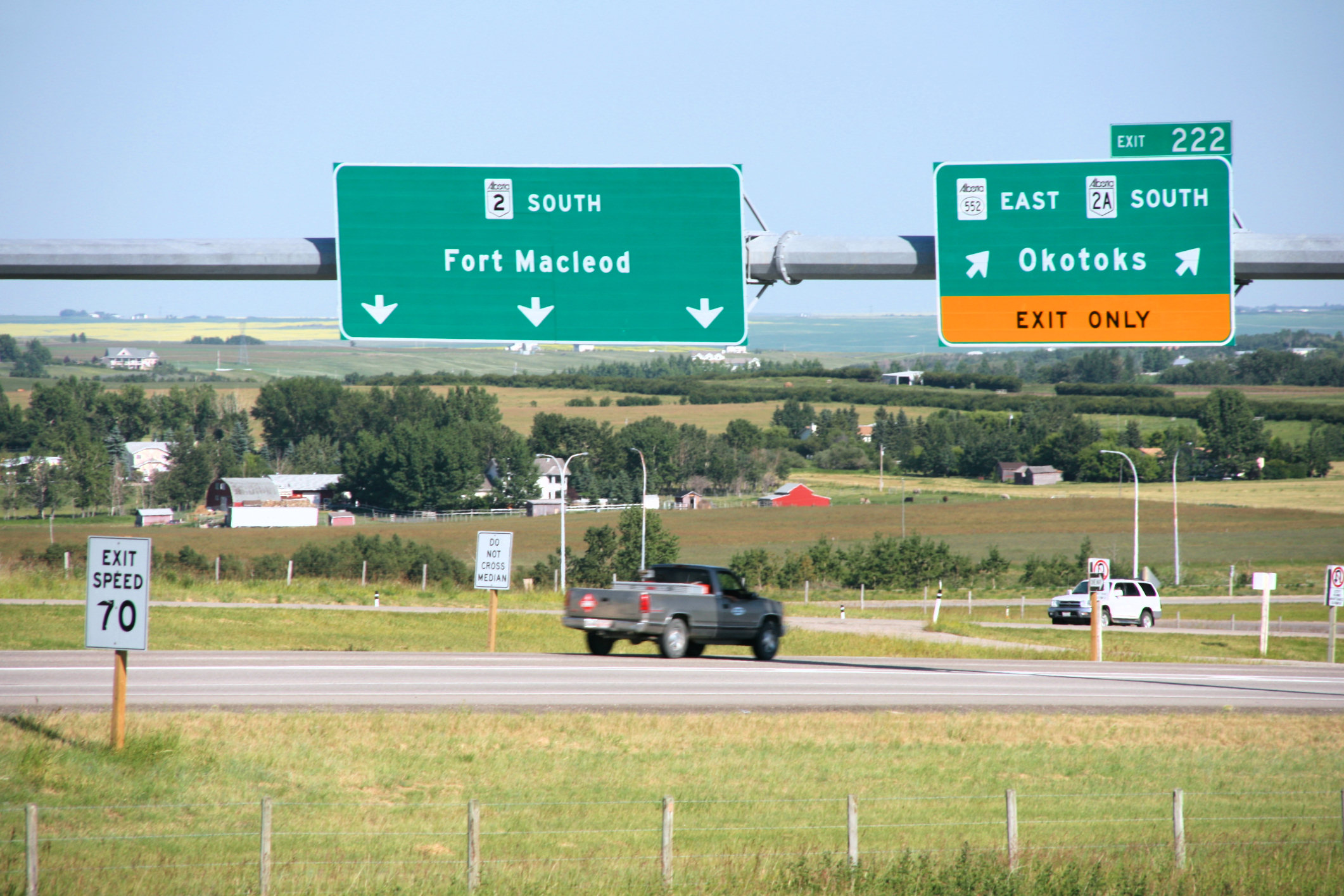
Near De Winton, Highway 2A splits to the southwest, connecting Calgary to Okotoks.

=== Major intersections ===
Rural/specialized municipality	Location	km	mi	Destinations	Notes
M.D. of Willow Creek No. 26–Foothills County boundary	Connemara	−25.2	−15.7	Highway 2 – Calgary, Fort Macleod, Lethbridge	Former Highway 2A southern terminus
Foothills County	Cayley	−18.7	−11.6		
Foothills County		−14.9	−9.3	Highway 540	
High River		−1.6	−0.99	12 Avenue SE to Highway 23 east – Vulcan	Former Highway 2A follows 12 Avenue SE; to Highway 2 (exit 194)
High River		−3.6	−2.2	Centre Street / 12 Avenue SE	Former Highway 2A follows Centre Street
High River		−2.3	−1.4	Crosses the Highwood River	
Foothills County		0.0	0.0	Highway 543 west / 498 Avenue E east – Longview	High River town limits; Highway 2A southern terminus; to Highway 2 (exit 197)
Foothills County	Aldersyde	10.7	6.6	Highway 7 east to Highway 2 / Highway 547 – Mossleigh, Calgary, Fort Macleod	South end of Highway 7 concurrency; to Highway 2 (exit 209)
Okotoks		15.0	9.3	32 Street E	
Okotoks		16.7	10.4	Highway 7 west – Black Diamond, Turner Valley Southridge Drive (Highway 783 south)	North end of Highway 7 concurrency; Highway 2A follows Southridge Drive
Okotoks		19.0	11.8	Crosses the Sheep River (North end of Southridge Drive • South end of Northridge Drive)	
Okotoks		19.5	12.1	Elizabeth Street (Highway 549 west) – Millarville	
Foothills County		26.9	16.7	290 Avenue E – De Winton	
Foothills County		27.9	17.3	Highway 552 east Highway 2 south – Fort Macleod, Lethbridge	Highway 2 exit 222; south end of Highway 2 concurrency
Foothills County		30.5	19.0	Highway 2 north (Deerfoot Trail) – Calgary	Highway 2 exit 225; northbound exit and southbound entrance; north end of Highway 2 concurrency
Foothills County		33.3	20.7	Dunbow Road – De Winton, Heritage Pointe	Proposed Interchange; Northbound access to Highway 552
City of Calgary		35.3	21.9	Highway 552 south (226 Avenue S) – De Winton	Calgary city limits; proposed interchange; southbound right in/right out; becomes Macleod Trail
City of Calgary		37.5	23.3	210 Avenue S	Proposed Diverging diamond interchange
City of Calgary		38.6	24.0	194 Avenue S	Proposed partial interchange; to be a southbound exit and northbound entrance
City of Calgary		40.6	25.2	Stoney Trail (Highway 201) Macleod Trail – City Centre	Highway 2A northern terminus; Highway 201 exit 5; formerly Highway 22X; Macleod Trail continues north
1.000 mi = 1.609 km; 1.000 km = 0.621 mi: Closed/former; Concurrency terminus; Incomplete access

== Central Alberta ==
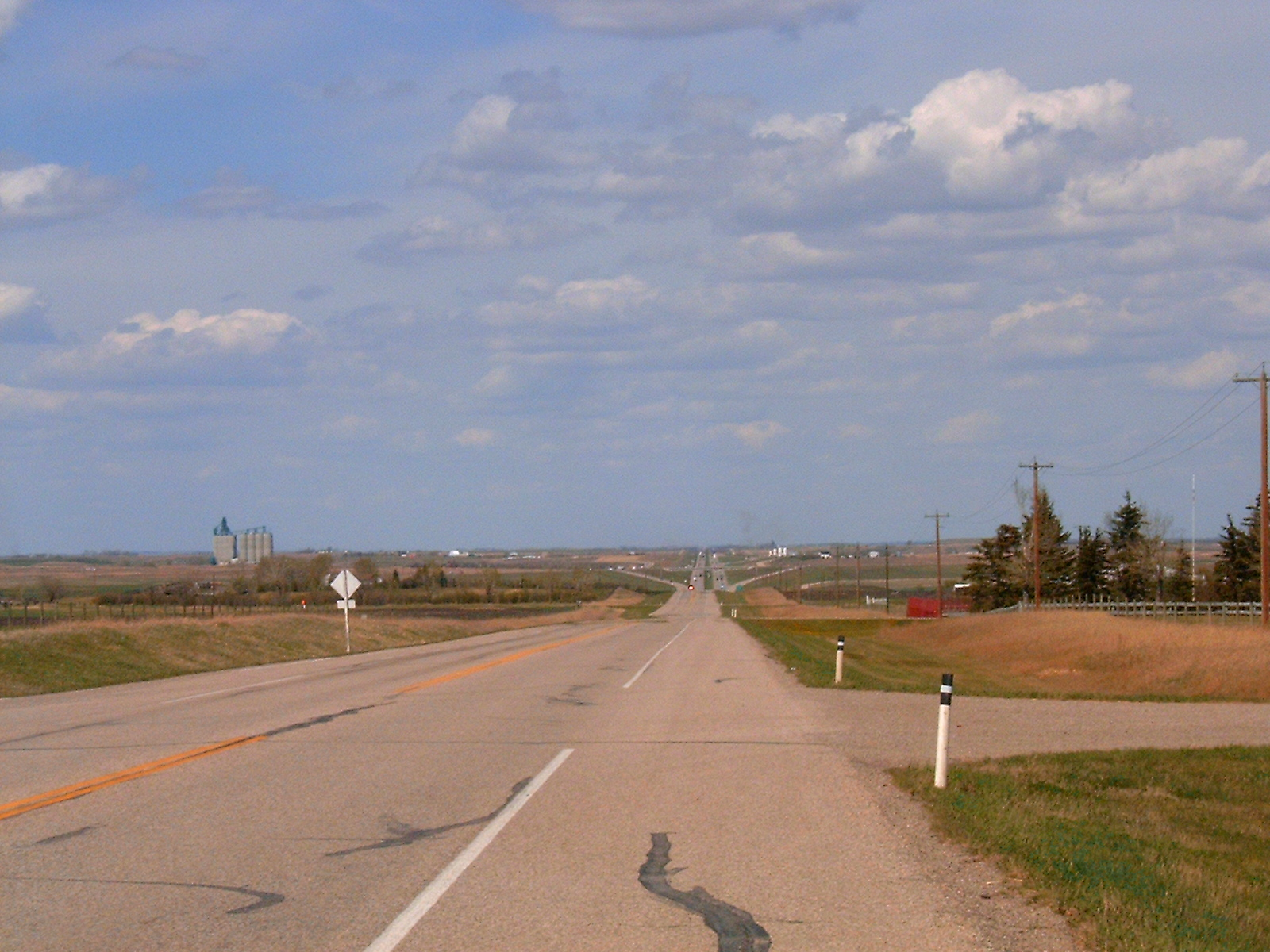
Highway 2A north of Crossfield in the foreground with divided Highway 2 in the distance.

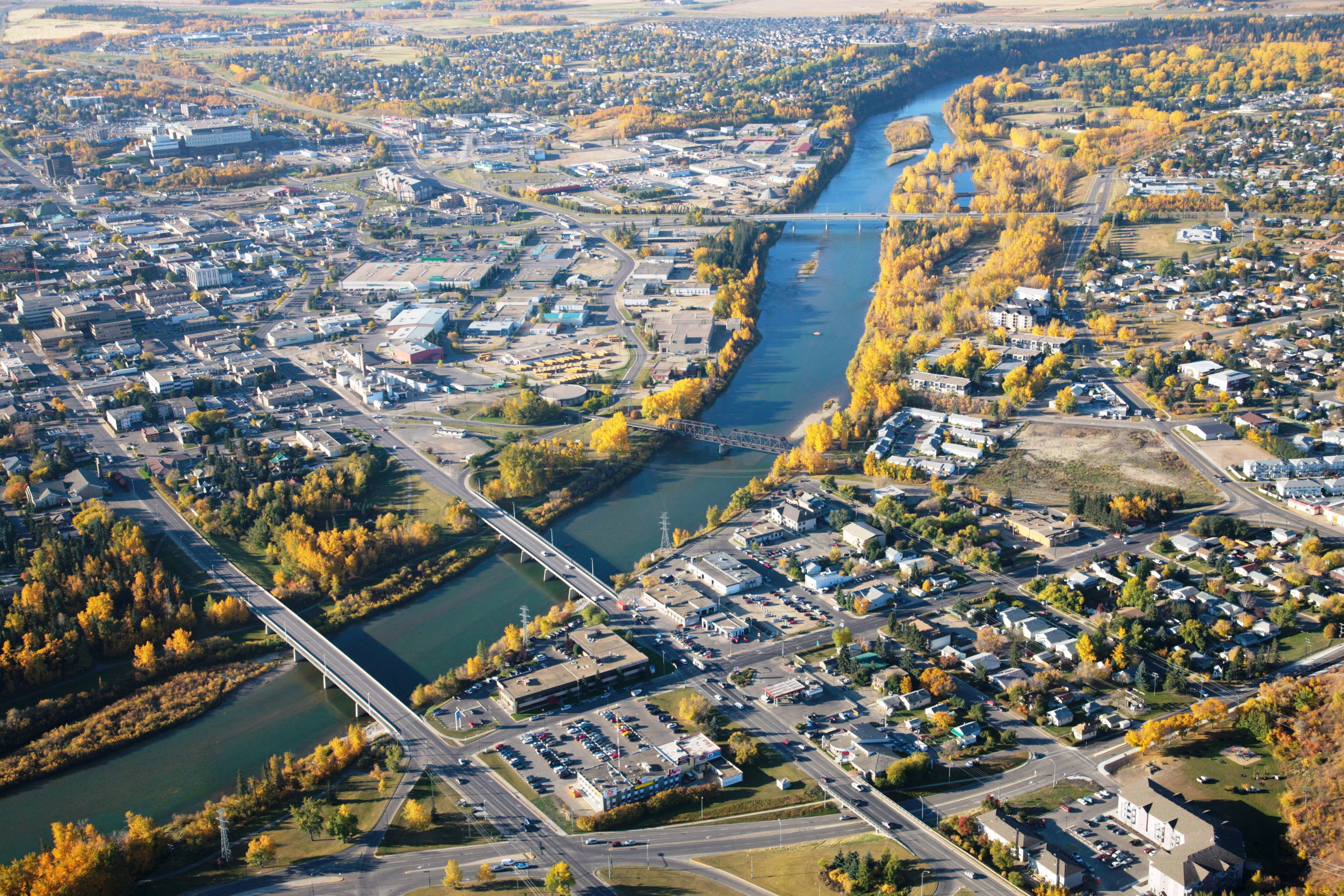
Downtown Red Deer from the air with Highway 2A twin bridges crossing the Red Deer River.

In its central Alberta segment, Highway 2A runs adjacent to the Queen Elizabeth II Highway without entering Calgary or Edmonton. Highway 2A generally runs parallel to the Canadian Pacific Railway Calgary–Edmonton line, which runs to the west of Highway 2 between Crossfield and Red Deer, and to the east of Highway 2 between Red Deer and Leduc. Highway 2A is divided into two subsections with a 13 km (8 mi) gap between Bowden and Innisfail.

The first subsection of Highway 2A starts at the Highway 2 / Highway 72 interchange (Exit 295) and passes through the town of Crossfield, town of Carstairs, and by the town of Didsbury before entering the town of Olds along 46 Avenue and intersecting Highway 27 (46 Street). The highway continues north to the town of Bowden before terminating at Highway 587, just west of Highway 2 (Exit 357).

The second subsection begins in the town of Innisfail at Highway 590 (50 Street), just west of Highway 2 (Exit 368), along 42 Avenue. The highway continues north and passes through the town of Penhold before entering the city of Red Deer along Taylor Drive. The highway turns east along 19 Street and then north along Gaetz Avenue. Highway 2A splits into one-way couplets through downtown Red Deer, with northbound traffic following 49 Avenue and southbound traffic following portions of Gaetz Avenue and 51 Avenue. After crossing the Red Deer River, the one-way streets rejoin and intersect Highway 11 (67 Street) and Highway 11A, which forms Red Deer's northern city limit. The highway continues north through the town of Blackfalds and city of Lacombe. North of Lacombe, the highway rejoins Highway 2 and shares the same alignment for 5 km (3 mi) before the highway branches northeast and passes through hamlet of Morningside, town of Ponoka, and hamlet of Maskwacis. The highway enters the city of Wetaskiwin along 56 Street and continues north through the town of Millet, by the hamlet of Kavanagh, before it rejoins Highway 2 (Exit 516) in the city of Leduc.

=== Major intersections ===
Rural/specialized municipality	Location	km	mi	Destinations	Notes
Rocky View County		0.0	0.0	Highway 72 east – Beiseker, Drumheller Highway 2 – Calgary, Red Deer, Edmonton	Interchange; Highway 2 exit 295; continues as Highway 72
Rocky View County		2.1	1.3	Dickson Stevenson Trail – Airdrie	
Rocky View County	Crossfield	6.4	4.0	Highway 574 west – Madden	
Rocky View County		11.3	7.0	Acme Road (Township Road 292) to Highway 2 – Acme	Highway 2 exit 305
Mountain View County		18.9	11.7	Highway 580 west – Cremona	
Mountain View County	Carstairs	22.4	13.9	Highway 581 east (Gough Road)	
Mountain View County	Didsbury	33.8	21.0	Highway 582 – Linden	
Mountain View County	Olds	48.3	30.0	Highway 27 (46 Street) – Sundre, Three Hills	
Red Deer County		62.2	38.6	Highway 2 south	Access only from southbound Highway 2 (exit 353)
Red Deer County	Bowden	66.4	41.3	Highway 587 to Highway 2	Adjacent to Highway 2 / Highway 587 interchange (exit 357)
Gap in route
Red Deer County	Innisfail	79.0	49.1	50 Street (Highway 590 east) to Highway 2 – Big Valley	Formerly Highway 54; adjacent to Highway 2 / Highway 590 interchange (exit 368)
Red Deer County	Penhold	92.7	57.6	Highway 42 east / Highway 592 west – Pine Lake	
Red Deer County	Springbrook	96.0	59.7	Airport Drive (Township Road 372) – Airport	
Red Deer County		99.5	61.8	McKenzie Road (Township Road 374)	
City of Red Deer		102.9– 103.6	63.9– 64.4	Highway 2 / 19 Street / Taylor Drive – Calgary, Edmonton	Highway 2 exit 395; Highway 2A follows 19 Street
City of Red Deer		104.1	64.7	19 Street (Highway 595 east) – Delburne Gaetz Avenue to Highway 2 south – Calgary	Highway 2A follows Gaetz Avenue; Highway 2 exit 394; northbound exit and southbound entrance to/from Highway 2
City of Red Deer		106.1	65.9	32 Street	
City of Red Deer		109.1	67.8	Crosses the Red Deer River	
City of Red Deer		110.4	68.6	67 Street (Highway 11) – Rocky Mountain House, Stettler	
City of Red Deer		113.6	70.6	Highway 11A west – Sylvan Lake	
Red Deer County	No major junctions				
Red Deer County–Lacombe County boundary		118.7	73.8	Crosses the Blindman River	
Lacombe County	Blackfalds	120.0	74.6	Highway 597 – Joffre	
City of Lacombe		132.3	82.2	50 Avenue (Highway 12) – Bentley, Stettler	
Lacombe County		138.4	86.0	Highway 2 south – Red Deer, Calgary	Highway 2 exit 431; south end of Highway 2 concurrency
Lacombe County		144.0	89.5	Highway 2 north – Edmonton	Highway 2 exit 437; north end of Highway 2 concurrency
Lacombe County	Morningside	146.9	91.3	Highway 597 west	
Ponoka County		156.4	97.2	Crosses the Battle River	
Ponoka County	Ponoka	158.2	98.3	Highway 53 – Rimbey, Bashaw	
Samson I.R. No. 137	Maskwacis	177.3	110.2	Highway 611 east – Ferintosh, New Norway	South end of Highway 611 concurrency
Ermineskin I.R. No. 138	Maskwacis	180.1	111.9	Highway 611 west	North end of Highway 611 concurrency
County of Wetaskiwin No. 10	No major junctions				
City of Wetaskiwin		193.5	120.2	Highway 13 west / Highway 613 east (40 Avenue) – Winfield	South end of Highway 13 concurrency
City of Wetaskiwin		196.7	122.2	Highway 13 east – Camrose	North end of Highway 13 concurrency
County of Wetaskiwin No. 10	Millet	209.5	130.2	Highway 616 west (45 Avenue) / Township Road 475 – Mulhurst	South end of Highway 616 concurrency
Leduc County		214.5	133.3	Highway 616 east – Armena	North end of Highway 616 concurrency
Leduc County	Kavanagh	221.3	137.5	Glen Park Road (Township Road 490)	
City of Leduc		227.2	141.2	Southfork Drive / 50 Street	Former alignment through Leduc
City of Leduc		229.0	142.3	Highway 2 – Edmonton, Red Deer, Calgary	Interchange; Highway 2; exit 516
1.000 mi = 1.609 km; 1.000 km = 0.621 mi: Concurrency terminus; Incomplete access

== Smith ==
- Highway 2A
- Length: 15 km (9 mi)
- South end: Highway 2 near Hondo
- North end: Smith

Highway 2A, known as Highway 2A:44 by Alberta Transportation, begins at Highway 2 near the hamlet of Hondo and connects with the hamlet of Smith. The segment provides access to communities in the Municipal District of Lesser Slave River No. 124 that are not directly served by Highway 2.

=== Major intersections ===
The entire route is in M.D. of Lesser Slave River No. 124.

Location	km	mi	Destinations	Notes
	0.0	0.0	Highway 2 – Slave Lake, Edmonton	Southern terminus
Hondo	2.9	1.8	Range Road 11A / Township Road 703A	
Smith	14.7	9.1	1 Avenue S	
Smith	14.7	9.1	Old Smith Highway	Continues west
1.000 mi = 1.609 km; 1.000 km = 0.621 mi

== High Prairie ==
- Highway 2A
- Length: 27 km (17 mi)
- East end: Highway 2 near High Prairie
- West end: Highway 49 near Guy

Highway 2A, known as Highway 2A:54 by Alberta Transportation, begins at Highway 2 at the locality of Triangle, 15 km (9 mi) west of the Town of High Prairie, and connects with Highway 49 near the hamlet of Guy. Prior to 1990, this section was signed as Highway 2 but was renumbered at the same time that Highway 34 was renumbered to Highway 43 (present day Highway 49) north of the Town of Valleyview.

This segment of Highway 2A is considered an alternate route of the Northern Woods and Water Route.

=== Major intersections ===
Rural/specialized municipality	Location	km	mi	Destinations	Notes
Big Lakes County		0.0	0.0	Highway 2 – McLennan, High Prairie, Edmonton	
M.D. of Smoky River No. 130		5.9	3.7	Highway 747 south – Sunset House	Formerly Highway 34 / Highway 34A
M.D. of Smoky River No. 130		27.4	17.0	Highway 49 – Valleyview, Peace River	
1.000 mi = 1.609 km; 1.000 km = 0.621 mi

== Grimshaw ==
- Highway 2A
- Length: 11 km (7 mi)
- East end: Highway 2 at Roma Junction
- West end: Highway 2 in Grimshaw

Highway 2A, known as Highway 2A:36 by Alberta Transportation, begins at Highway 2 at the locality of Roma Junction, 2 km (1 mi) west of the Peace River Airport and 13 km (8 mi) west of the town of Peace River, and terminates in the town of Grimshaw, where it passes the Mile Zero monument of the Mackenzie Highway.

The segment of Highway 2A through Grimshaw passes the starting point of Highway 35, the Mackenzie Highway, which runs north through the Peace River Country to the Northwest Territories. The town is the site of the Historic Mile 0 Mackenzie Park, which marks the southern terminus of that route.

=== Major intersections ===
The entire route is in M.D. of Peace No. 135.

Location	km	mi	Destinations	Notes
Roma Junction	0.0	0.0	Highway 2 – Grimshaw, Peace River	
Grimshaw	11.4	7.1	Highway 2 to Highway 35 / Highway 685 – Fairview, Peace River	Mile Zero of Mackenzie Highway
1.000 mi = 1.609 km; 1.000 km = 0.621 mi

== Former alignments ==
=== Barlow Trail ===
Highway 2A
- Barlow Trail
- Location: Calgary
- Length: 11 km (6.8 mi)
- Existed: 1971–1980s

In the 1960s, Highway 2 entered north Calgary along Barlow Trail; however in 1971 Highway 2 was realigned to the newly constructed Blackfoot Trail freeway (later renamed Deerfoot Trail). Highway 2A was established along most of the original alignment, starting at 16 Avenue NE (Trans-Canada Highway, Highway 1) in the south and continuing north along Barlow Trail for 10 km (6.2 mi), past the Calgary International Airport, to 112 Avenue NE (later renamed Country Hills Boulevard), where it travelled west for 1 km (0.62 mi) to its interchange with Deerfoot Trail. Direct access from Barlow Trail to Blackfoot Trail was closed to make room for the 17 Avenue SE / Blackfoot Trail / Deerfoot Trail interchange.

The Highway 2A designation was phased out in the mid-1980s and the Barlow Trail between 48 Avenue NE (just north of McKnight Boulevard) and the main terminal access was closed to allow for additional runway construction.

=== High River – Cayley ===
Highway 2A
- Location: Foothills County
- Length: 20 km (12 mi)
- Existed: 1950s–1997

The existing section of Highway 2A used to extend from High River along 10 Street SE, through the hamlet of Cayley, and intersect Highway 2 at the locality of Connemara, located 8 km (5 mi) north of the town of Nanton along the Foothills County / Willow Creek M.D. boundary. The segment was located only 1.6 km (0.99 mi) west of Highway 2 and was dropped by the province in 1997.

== See also ==
- Transportation in Calgary
