= Naphtha, Alberta =

Hamlet in Alberta, Canada

Naphtha
- Hamlet
- Location of Naphtha in Foothills County Naphtha (Alberta)
- Coordinates: 50.631302°N 114.231591°W
- Country: Canada
- Province: Alberta
- Region: Southern Alberta
- Census division: No. 6
- Municipal district: Foothills County

Government
  - Type: Unincorporated
  - Reeve: Delilah Miller
  - Governing body: Foothills County Council
- Time zone: UTC−06:00 (Alberta Time)
- Highways: Highway 22

Naphtha is a hamlet located in Foothills County, Alberta, Canada approximately 6.3 km (3.9 mi) south of the town of Diamond Valley and 10.7 km (6.6 mi) north of the village of Longview along Alberta Highway 22. The name comes from the liquid product Naphtha. Many of the houses in the original hamlet were bunkhouses built to house workers for the Home Oil Company, who drilled their first well in the area in 1929.

== See also ==
- List of hamlets in Alberta
