= Aldersyde, Alberta =

Aldersyde
- Hamlet
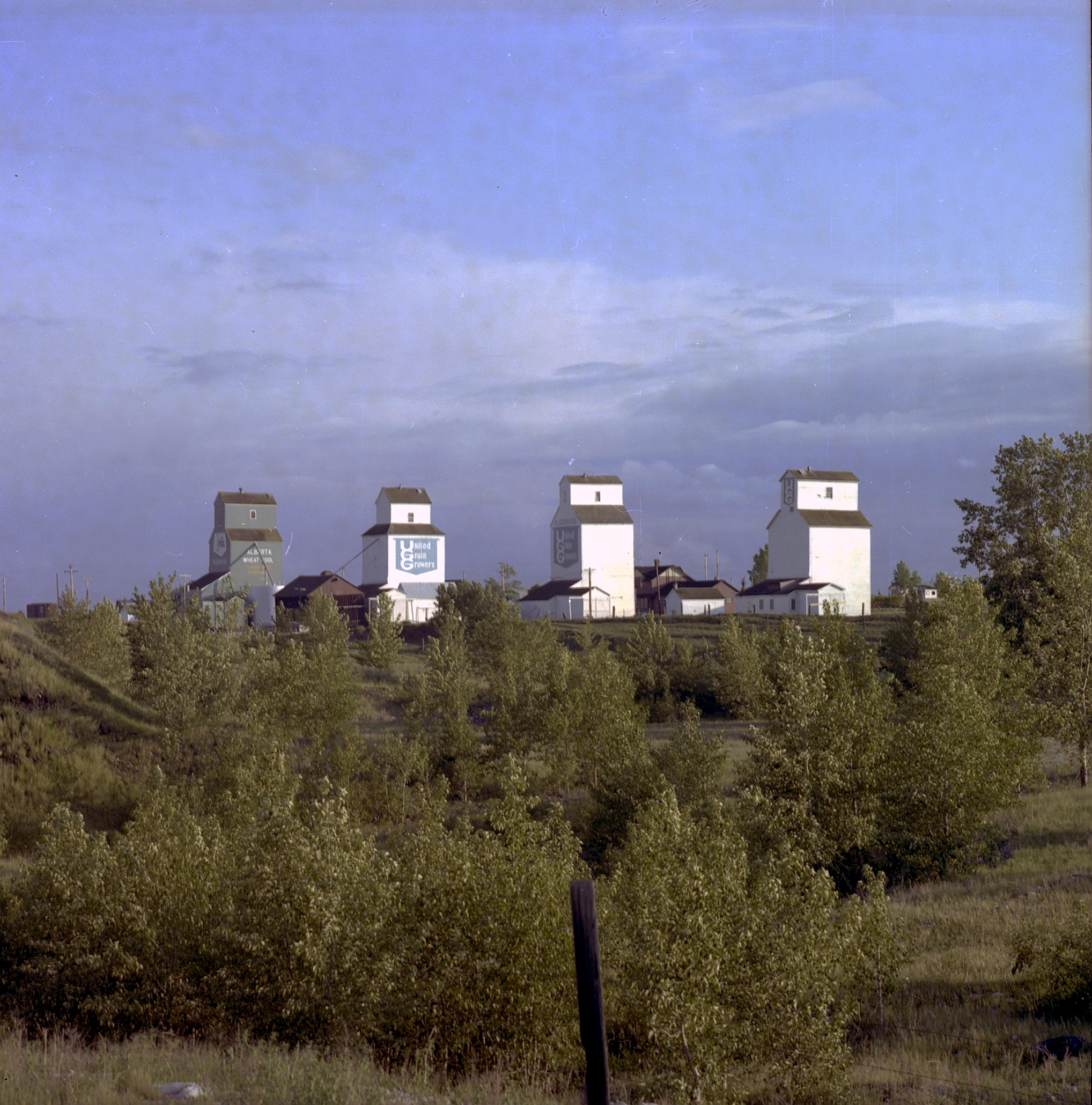
- Grain elevators, 1975

- Location of Aldersyde in Alberta
- Coordinates: 50°40′34″N 113°52′44″W
- Country: Canada
- Province: Alberta
- Region: Southern Alberta
- Census division: 6
- Municipal district: Foothills County

Population (2003)
  - Total: 64
- Time zone: UTC−06:00 (Alberta Time)
- Area code: +1-403

Aldersyde is a hamlet in Alberta, Canada within the Foothills County. Located between Highway 2 and Highway 2A south of Highway 7, the hamlet is approximately 8 kilometres (5.0 mi) southeast of Okotoks, 10 kilometres (6.2 mi) north of High River and 25 kilometres (16 mi) south of Calgary.

== Toponymy ==
Four origins have been proposed for Aldersyde's name, two of which are attributed to Aldersyde's early settlers being primarily Scottish. In these tellings, Aldersyde may derive its name from Aldersyde in Scotland, or from a fictitious location depicted in an 1883 book, Aldersyde, by Scottish writer Annie Swan.

Alternatively, the Calgary Herald reported in 1937 that J. D. O'Neal, upon whose land Aldersyde was built, named the hamlet for an abundance of alders in the area. According to the archives of the Mennonite Church Canada, Aldersyde was named by its first settler and postmaster, Elias Bricker.

== History ==
=== Before settlement ===
A prehistoric tipi ring was identified in the Aldersyde area by a 1986 archaeological survey, indicating the early presence of Indigenous groups.

=== Norma: 1890–1907 ===
Aldersyde began as a settlement named Norma, which was established around the year 1889. Some settlers relocated to Aldersyde's current location in 1893 following the establishment of a Canadian Pacific Railway line. What remained of Norma was destroyed in a fire soon after, and Aldersyde absorbed its surviving residents.

Mount View Mennonite Church opened in either 1901 or 1902, and a cemetery was established shortly afterwards. A schoolhouse named the Maple Leaf School opened in 1903.

The townsite was known as Aldersyde by 1907, when settler Elias Bricker established a post office under that name inside a general store.

=== Aldersyde: 1908–1980 ===
In 1911, Aldersyde was connected to Lethbridge and Vulcan via the Kipp-Aldersyde line. Surveyors from the Dominion Land Survey recorded Aldersyde Station as a community in 1919.

Aldersyde's church closed in 1946. Maple Leaf School closed in 1953, and the building was repurposed into a community hall by Aldersyde Community Association in 1956.

Owing to a dwindling number of parishioners, the Mount View Mennonite Church closed in 1974. The church was converted into a private dwelling, while the Trinity Mennonite Church of Calgary assumed responsibility for maintaining the cemetery. As of 2021, the cemetery remains in use.

=== Hamlet: 1980–present ===
Aldersyde was declared a hamlet in 1980.

The Magnesium Company of Canada opened a smelting plant in Aldersyde in February 1990, creating 145 jobs in the area. Following a decline in magnesium prices, majority partner Alberta Natural Gas pulled out of the plant, and the operation closed in February 1991. The abandoned plant remains standing outside Aldersyde as of 2018.

The Foothills School Division announced its intention to build a high school in Aldersyde in September 2015. The project was abandoned by May 2016 after the Town of Okotoks raised concerns about the location.

In 2021, the Alberta Law Enforcement Response Team (ALERT) dismantled a fentanyl "superlab" operating in Aldersyde. The volume of fentanyl and other substances seized by the investigation, named Project Essence, had an estimated street value of over $300 million. As of 2025, the volume of isotonitazene seized represented the largest seizure of its kind in North America.

In October 2022, TC Energy announced plans to install a $146-million solar power farm near Aldersyde. By January 2024, enough bifacial solar cells were installed to generate 81 megawatts, sufficient to power approximately 20,000 homes. A second solar energy project planned for the area, this time by Capital Power, was cancelled in 2024 after the Government of Alberta announced a temporary pause on renewable energy approvals.

Foothills County Council approved a 1,100-acre residential development bordering Aldersyde in April 2025. If completed, the development could add between 4,000 and 16,000 residents to Aldersyde, as well as a school and fire hall.

== Services ==
=== Municipal services ===
Aldersyde receives waste management and potable water services via the Foothills County municipality, as well as emergency services.

=== Rail connections ===
As of 2026, the Canadian Pacific Kansas City railroad operates through the hamlet.

=== Recreation ===
The Foothills-Okotoks Regional Field House in Aldersyde provides indoor recreation facilities as of 2026. The Aldersyde Community Association also remains active.

== Demographics ==
The population of Aldersyde according to the 2003 municipal census conducted by Foothills County is 64.

== See also ==
- List of communities in Alberta
- List of hamlets in Alberta
