= Azure, Alberta =

Locality in Foothills County, Canada

Coordinates: 50.502°N 113.871°W

Location of Azure, Alberta

Azure is a locality within the Foothills County in the Calgary Region, of Alberta, Canada. It is located 3.0 km (1.9 mi) west of Highway 2 on a Canadian Pacific rail line, 7.8 km (4.8 mi) south of High River and 5.8 km (3.6 mi) north of Cayley.

== See also ==
- List of communities in Alberta
