= Hartell, Alberta =

Hamlet in Alberta, Canada

Hartell
- Hamlet
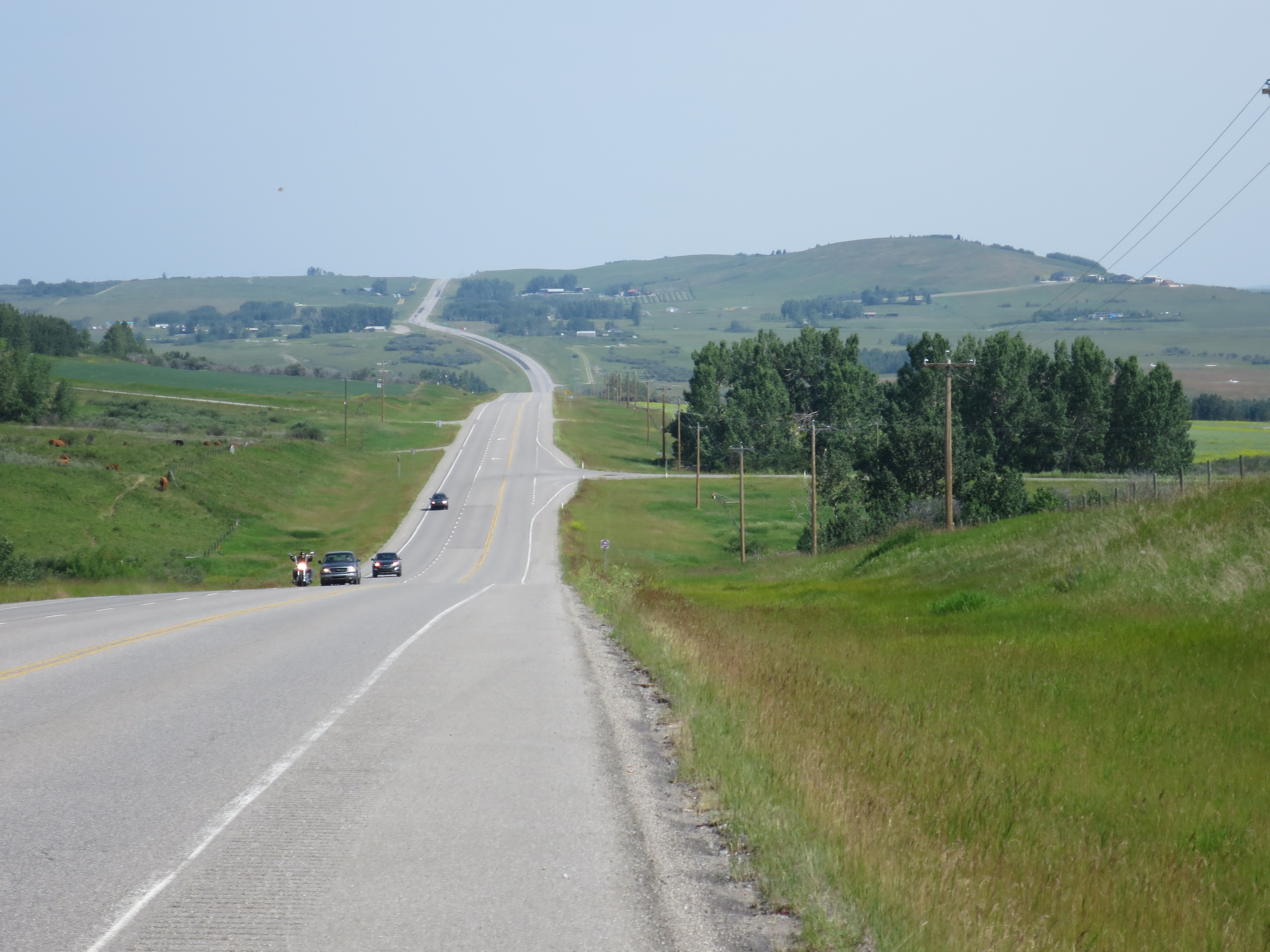
- Hartell seen from the south

- Location of Hartell in Foothills County Hartell (Alberta)
- Coordinates: 50.6022°N 114.2353°W
- Country: Canada
- Province: Alberta
- Region: Southern Alberta
- Census division: No. 6
- Municipal district: Foothills County

Government
  - Type: Unincorporated
  - Reeve: Delilah Miller
  - Governing body: Foothills County Council
- Time zone: UTC−06:00 (Alberta Time)
- Highways: Highway 22; Highway 543

Hartell is a hamlet in Alberta, Canada that is under the jurisdiction of Foothills County. It is at the intersection of Highway 22 and Highway 543, approximately 10 km (6.2 mi) south of Black Diamond, 8 km (5.0 mi) north of Longview, and 27 km (17 mi) west of High River.

== See also ==
- List of hamlets in Alberta
