= Alberta Highway 7 =

Highway in Alberta, Canada

Highway 7

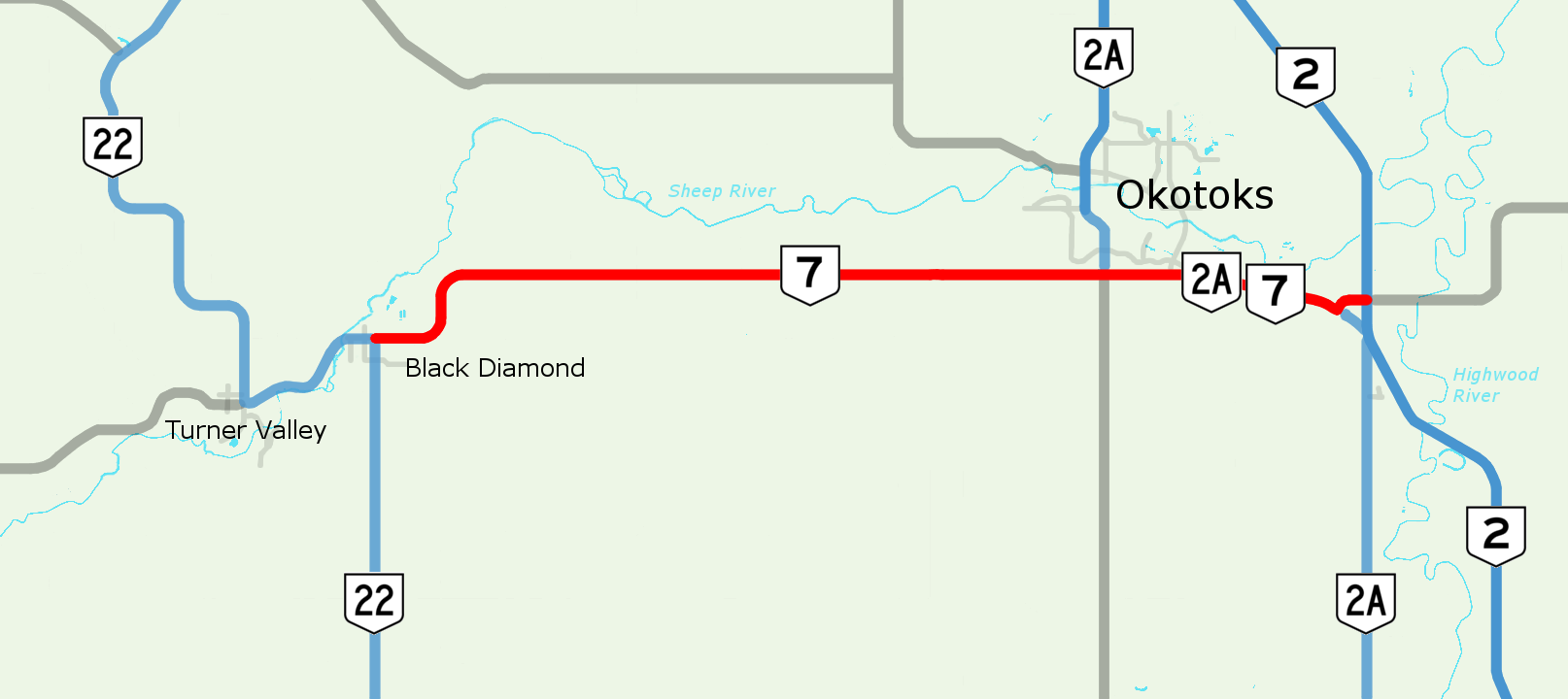

Route information
- Maintained by the Ministry of Transportation and Economic Corridors
- Length: 26.2 km (16.3 mi)

Major junctions
- West end: Highway 22 in Diamond Valley
- Highway 2A in Okotoks
- East end: Highway 2 / Highway 547 near Aldersyde

Location
- Country: Canada
- Province: Alberta
- Specialized and rural municipalities: Foothills County
- Towns: Diamond Valley, Okotoks

Highway system
- Alberta Numbered Highway Network; List; Former
← Highway 6	→ Highway 8

Highway 7 is an east–west highway in the Calgary Region of Alberta, Canada. Running 26.2 km (16.3 mi) between Highway 22 at its western terminus in Diamond Valley and Highway 2 near the hamlet of Aldersyde at its eastern end, the route traverses Foothills County through open ranching and agricultural country south of Calgary. The two principal communities along the route are Diamond Valley near the western terminus and Okotoks near the eastern end, with the highway passing along the southern boundary of Okotoks before reaching the Highway 2 interchange at Aldersyde, where it is succeeded by Highway 547 continuing east.

Highway 7 begins in Diamond Valley, a town created on January 1, 2023 through the amalgamation of the former towns of Black Diamond and Turner Valley, communities that had discussed merging for approximately four decades before the consolidation took effect. The western terminus at Highway 22 lies at the junction with the north-south corridor connecting Longview to the south and Bragg Creek to the north.

The communities now forming Diamond Valley developed in proximity to the Turner Valley oil and gas field. On May 14, 1914, the Dingman No. 1 well struck gas-saturated formations beneath the valley floor, an event credited to William Stewart Herron and Archibald Dingman, triggering the first major oil rush in western Canada. The field produced primarily natural gas through the 1910s, 1920s and early 1930s, then on June 16, 1936, the Royalties No. 1 well reached a major oil reservoir beneath the gas formation, making Turner Valley one of Canada's principal producing fields through the 1940s. The Black Diamond and Turner Valley communities, now amalgamated as Diamond Valley, grew and diversified through and after this period, with Highway 7 connecting them to the broader regional road network at the Highway 22 corridor.

From Diamond Valley the highway runs east through Foothills County, a ranching and mixed-farming municipality occupying the western approaches to the Calgary urban area. West of Okotoks, the route passes the Okotoks Erratic, a quartzite boulder commonly known as the Big Rock. The erratic weighs approximately 16,500 tonnes and measures roughly 41 m (135 ft) in length, 18 m (59 ft) in width and 9 m (30 ft) in height, placing it among the largest glacial erratics on record. The rock originated in what is now Jasper National Park, formed from sediments deposited between 600 million and 520 million years ago and subsequently hardened into quartzite by heat and pressure. A rockslide during the last ice age deposited it onto a glacier in the Athabasca River valley; the glacial sheet transported it across the landscape before retreating and leaving it on the prairie approximately 10,000 years ago. The site holds spiritual significance for Blackfoot peoples and is administered as a provincial historic site; the name Okotoks derives from the Blackfoot word for rock, okatok.

The highway passes along the southern edge of Okotoks, which had a population of 30,214 in the 2021 census. The community's name reflects the same Blackfoot word as the erratic to its west. A stopping house on the Macleod Trail in the 1880s preceded permanent settlement, and a Canadian Pacific Railway branch line reached Okotoks in 1891, after which it functioned as a centre for ranching, sawmilling and transportation in the Foothills district. The 1914 Turner Valley discovery brought further growth to the area. From the 1960s and 1970s onward, Okotoks grew substantially as a commuter community for Calgary, located approximately 20 km (12 mi) to the north, and residential expansion continued through subsequent decades as the population of the Calgary metropolitan area increased.

Through Okotoks, Highway 7 shares its alignment with Highway 2A at two points: from the western Okotoks junction (km 19.3) to 32 Street E (km 20.9), and again from west of Highway 2 (km 25.2) to the eastern terminus (km 26.2). Highway 2A occupies an older north-south alignment through Foothills County, connecting communities along the former through-traffic route that predates the twinning of Highway 2. At km 26.2, Highway 7 ends at an interchange with Highway 2 north of the hamlet of Aldersyde, where it is succeeded by Highway 547 continuing east toward Mossleigh.

Highway 7 originally continued south from Black Diamond to Longview, but the section was renumbered as an extension of Highway 22 in the early 1970s.

== Major intersections ==
The following is a list of major intersections along Alberta Highway 7 from west to east.

Rural/specialized municipality	Location	km	mi	Destinations	Notes
Diamond Valley		0.0	0.0	Highway 22 (Government Road / Centre Avenue) – Longview, Bragg Creek	Continues as Highway 22 north
Foothills County	No major junctions				
Okotoks		19.3	12.0	Highway 2A north (Southridge Drive) / Highway 783 south – Calgary	West end of Highway 2A concurrency
Okotoks		20.9	13.0	32 Street E	
Foothills County	Aldersyde	25.2	15.7	Highway 2A south – High River	East end of Highway 2A concurrency
Foothills County	Aldersyde	26.2	16.3	Highway 2 – Calgary, Fort Macleod, Lethbridge Highway 547 east – Mossleigh	Interchange; Highway 2 exit 209; continues as Highway 547 east
1.000 mi = 1.609 km; 1.000 km = 0.621 mi: Concurrency terminus
