= Paul Green =

Paul Green may refer to:

== Sports ==
- Paul Green (American football) (born 1966), American football player
- Paul Green (cricketer) (born 1976), former English cricketer
- Paul Green (footballer, born 1983), Irish footballer
- Paul Green (footballer, born 1987), English footballer
- Paul Green (rugby league) (1972–2022), Australian rugby league player and coach
- Paul Green (taekwondo) (born 1977), GB Taekwondo National Team coach and former Olympic taekwondo athlete

== Others ==
- Paul Green (Australian politician) (born 1966), mayor of Shoalhaven City Council and member of the Legislative Council of New South Wales
- Paul Green (American politician), member of the Montana House of Representatives
- Paul Green (drug dealer), operator of the UK's largest drug supply ring
- Paul Green (engineer) (1924–2018), American electrical engineer
- Paul Green (musician) (born 1972), founder of the Paul Green School of Rock Music
- Paul Green (playwright) (1894–1981), American playwright
- Paul E. Green (1927–2012), American marketing professor and statistician
- Paul W. Green (born 1952), Texas Supreme Court justice

== See also ==
- Paul Greene (disambiguation)
