= Port Cornwall, Alberta =

Port Cornwall Mirror Landing
- Former village
- Location of Port Cornwall Port Cornwall (Alberta)
- Coordinates: 55°10′01″N 114°03′30″W
- Country: Canada
- Province: Alberta
- Region: Northern Alberta
- Census division: 17
- Municipal district (MD): MD of Lesser Slave River No. 124
- Incorporated (village): October 27, 1913
- Dissolved: September 11, 1917

Government
  - Type: Unincorporated
  - Governing body: MD of Lesser Slave River No. 124 Council
- Time zone: UTC−06:00 (Alberta Time)
- Area codes: 780, 587, 825
- Waterways: Athabasca River, Lesser Slave River

Port Cornwall, also known as Mirror Landing, was a village in northern Alberta within the Municipal District of Lesser Slave River No. 124. Located on the north shore where the Lesser Slave River meets the Athabasca River, it was effectively replaced by Smith, located 1.4 km (0.87 mi) away on the south shore.

== Toponymy ==
Port Cornwall was named for politician James Cornwall.

== History ==
=== Early settlement and founding: 1700s–1912 ===
The first semi-permanent settlement at the site of Port Cornwall was a trading post of the North West Company, established in 1799. It would not be until 1909 that a townsite was founded, named Mirror Landing, beside the confluence of the Lesser Slave River and the Athabasca River. The community developed as a trading post and rest stop for traders and travellers who navigated the rivers by boat.

By the early 1910s, Mirror Landing contained several stores and boarding houses, as well as a pool room and restaurants. An unofficial school began operating to serve children from the community.

In 1912, the Government of Alberta introduced a ferry service that would cross the Athabasca River, launching 300 yards downstream from Mirror Landing. In anticipation of business the ferry would bring, Mirror Landing's business community built around six additional boarding houses.

=== Railway and change of name: 1913 ===
In 1913, the Edmonton, Dunvegan and British Columbia Railway (ED&BC) reached Mirror Landing. Work began to extend the railroad through the townsite, and the introduction of construction and railway workers to the area brought a temporary boost to Mirror Landing's economy. The area also attracted bootleggers, gamblers, and sex workers.

Locals petitioned to incorporate their settlement as a village, though under the name Port Cornwall rather than Mirror Landing. The board of trade had voted to honour politician James Cornwall, who was involved with the area's lumber industry. When the community was incorporated as a village on October 27, the Ministry of Municipal Affairs erroneously printed its name as Fort Cornwall (rather than Port). Despite the change, a post office opened that same month under the name Mirror Landing.

According to Alberta Municipal Affairs, Port Cornwall's population reached 200 in 1913. The Royal North West Mounted Police established a barracks in the village, and the federal government installed a justice of the peace, William Mortimer Gardiner. He quickly began issuing fines for assaults and public drunkenness.

=== Dissolution and replacement by Smith: 1914–1917 ===
Port Cornwall's growth quickly reversed when the ED&BC continued building across the confluence, establishing a divisional point across the river in 1914. Railway industrialist J. D. McArthur opted to bypass Port Cornwall for financial reasons: the ED&BC company stood to profit from creating a town of its own, where it controlled the lots it could sell to residents. This new community became the hamlet of Smith.

As freight rail services began to eliminate demand for cargo ships, Port Cornwall's population declined, and its post office moved to Smith. In 1915, Port Cornwall's judge, Gardiner, became the subject of police scrutiny when he failed to surrender money he had collected from issuing fines. Wanted for larceny, he became a fugitive in July.

In January 1916, a provincial deputy minister reported that Port Cornwall had "practically ceased to exist, that is, most of the people who were living [there] have left". The Village of Port Cornwall was officially dissolved by the provincial government on September 11, 1917.

== Modern day ==
By 1976, none of the village's buildings remained standing.

== See also ==
- List of communities in Alberta
- List of former urban municipalities in Alberta
- List of ghost towns in Alberta
