= Alberta Highway 72 =

Highway in Alberta, Canada

Highway 72

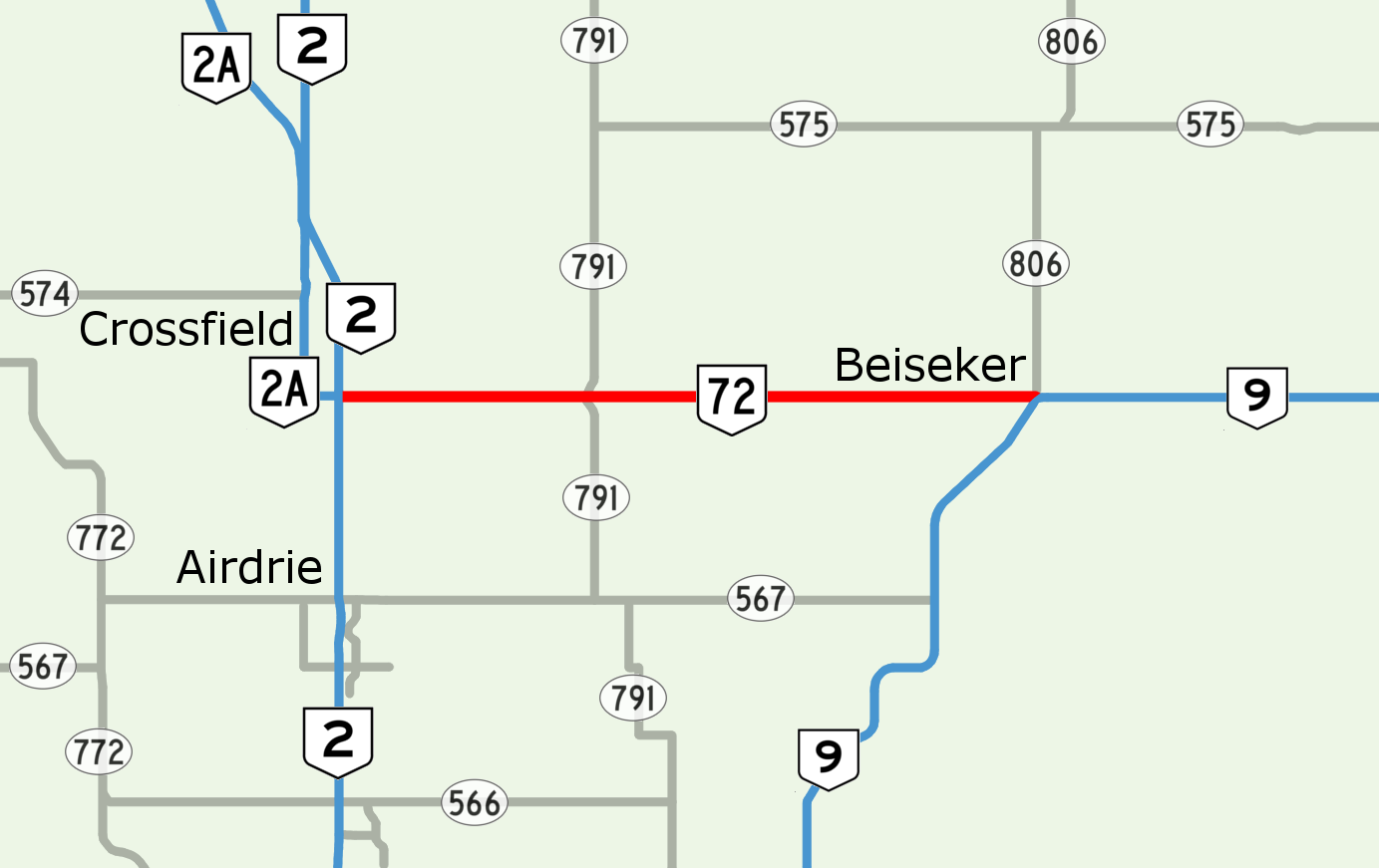
- Highway 72 highlighted in red

Route information
- Maintained by the Ministry of Transportation and Economic Corridors
- Length: 33.4 km (20.8 mi)

Major junctions
- West end: Highway 2 / Highway 2A near Crossfield
- East end: Highway 9 / Highway 806 in Beiseker

Location
- Country: Canada
- Province: Alberta
- Specialized and rural municipalities: Rocky View County
- Villages: Beiseker

Highway system
- Alberta Provincial Highway Network; List; Former
← Highway 68	→ Highway 88

Highway 72 is a 33 km (21 mi) highway in central Alberta, Canada, connecting the Queen Elizabeth II Highway near Crossfield to Highway in Beiseker.

At its west end, Highway 72 begins at its intersection with Highways 2 and 2A at Exit 295 southeast of the Town of Crossfield and ends at Highways 9 and 806 at the Village of Beiseker. The entire stretch of Highway 72 is in Rocky View County.

== Major intersections ==
The entire route is in Rocky View County.

Location	km	mi	Destinations	Notes
	0.0	0.0	Highway 2A north – Crossfield Highway 2 – Calgary, Red Deer, Edmonton	Interchange; exit 295 on Highway 2; through traffic follows Highway 2A
	11.9	7.4	Highway 791	
Beiseker	33.5	20.8	Highway 9 – Drumheller, Irricana, Calgary; Highway 806 north – Acme, Linden	Through traffic follows Highway 9 east
1.000 mi = 1.609 km; 1.000 km = 0.621 mi
