= Foothills County =

Municipal district in Alberta, Canada

Foothills County Municipal District of Sheep River No. 31 (1954) Municipal District of Foothills No. 31 (1954–2018)
- Municipal district
- Logo

- Location
- Country: Canada
- Province: Alberta
- Region: Calgary Region
- Census division: 6
- Established: 1944
- Incorporated: 1944
- Name change: January 1, 2019

Government
  - Reeve: Rob Siewert
  - Governing body: Foothills County Council
  - CAO: Ryan Payne
  - Administrative office: High River

Area (2021)
  - Land: 3,604.76 km^{2} (1,391.81 sq mi)

Population (2021)
  - Total: 23,199
  - Density: 6.4/km^{2} (17/sq mi)
- Time zone: UTC−06:00 (Alberta Time)
- Website: mdfoothills.com

Foothills County is a municipal district in southern Alberta, Canada adjacent to the south side of Calgary in Census Division No. 6. Despite sharing a common border with the City of Calgary, it does not form part of the Calgary census metropolitan area (CMA) as defined by Statistics Canada. It is however a member municipality of the Calgary Metropolitan Region Board, though it has indicated that it may withdraw its membership.

== History ==
Foothills County was originally formed as the Municipal District (MD) of Sheep River No. 31 on January 1, 1954, through the amalgamation of portions of Improvement District No. 46 and the MDs of Highwood No. 31, Turner Valley No. 32, and Springbank No. 45. Its name was changed to the MD of Foothills No. 31 shortly thereafter on March 25, 1954. Foothills County assumed its present name on January 1, 2019.

== Geography ==
=== Communities and localities ===
The following urban municipalities are surrounded by Foothills County.

Cities

- none

Towns

- Diamond Valley
- High River
- Okotoks

Villages

- Longview

Summer villages

- none

The following hamlets are located within Foothills County.

- Aldersyde
- Blackie
- Cayley
- De Winton
- Hartell
- Heritage Pointe
- Millarville
- Naphtha
- Priddis
- Priddis Greens

The following localities are located within Foothills County.

Localities

- Alder Heights
- Aspen Creek Estates
- Azure
- Black Diamond
- Caravelle Estates
- Connemara
- De Winton Heights
- Eltham
- Gladys
- Kew
- Leduc Lynnwood Ranch

- Leisure Lake
- Mazeppa
- Naptha
- Pekisko
- Pineridge Estates
- Rio Frio
- Royalties
- Sandstone
- Turner Valley
- Valleyview Acres

== Demographics ==
In the 2021 Census of Population conducted by Statistics Canada, Foothills County had a population of 23,199 living in 8,450 of its 9,075 total private dwellings, a change of 2.6% from its 2016 population of 22,616. With a land area of 3,604.76 km^{2} (1,391.81 sq mi), it had a population density of 6.4/km^{2} (16.7/sq mi) in 2021.

In the 2016 Census of Population conducted by Statistics Canada, Foothills County had a population of 22,766 living in 8,156 of its 8,689 total private dwellings, a 7.1% change from its 2011 population of 21,248. With a land area of 3,636.8 km^{2} (1,404.2 sq mi), it had a population density of 6.3/km^{2} (16.2/sq mi) in 2016.

== Attractions ==
- Big Rock
- Cavalry FC
- De Winton/South Calgary Airport
- Frank Lake
- High River Airport
- Spruce Meadows

== See also ==
- List of communities in Alberta
- List of municipal districts in Alberta
