= Kavanagh, Alberta =

Hamlet in Alberta, Canada

Kavanagh
- Hamlet
- Location of Kavanagh Kavanagh (Canada)
- Coordinates: 53°10′56″N 113°31′01″W
- Country: Canada
- Province: Alberta
- Region: Edmonton Metropolitan Region
- Census division: 11
- Municipal district: Leduc County
- Established: 1980

Government
  - Type: Unincorporated
  - Governing body: Leduc County Council

Area (2021)
  - Land: 0.33 km^{2} (0.13 sq mi)

Population (2021)
  - Total: 39
  - Density: 118.3/km^{2} (306/sq mi)
- Time zone: UTC−06:00 (Alberta Time)
- Area codes: 780, 587, 825

Kavanagh is a hamlet in Alberta, Canada within Leduc County. It is located on Highway 2A between Millet and Leduc, approximately 30 kilometres (19 mi) south of Edmonton.

The hamlet was settled by workers of the Kavanagh block of the Canadian National Railway and was named for Charles Edmund Kavanagh, railway superintendent. The grain elevators have since closed and been relocated.

Kavanagh was declared a hamlet on January 5, 1980 by Marvin E. Moore, Minister of Municipal Affairs.

== Demographics ==
In the 2021 Census of Population conducted by Statistics Canada, Kavanagh had a population of 39 living in 19 of its 21 total private dwellings, a change of −17% from its 2016 population of 47. With a land area of 0.33 km^{2} (0.13 sq mi), it had a population density of 118.2/km^{2} (306.1/sq mi) in 2021.

As a designated place in the 2016 Census of Population conducted by Statistics Canada, Kavanagh had a population of 47 living in 20 of its 21 total private dwellings, a change of −9.6% from its 2011 population of 52. With a land area of 0.33 km^{2} (0.13 sq mi), it had a population density of 142.4/km^{2} (368.9/sq mi) in 2016.

== See also ==
- List of communities in Alberta
- List of hamlets in Alberta
- Leduc County
