= Morningside, Alberta =

Morningside
- Hamlet
- Location of Morningside Morningside (Canada)
- Coordinates: 52°34′40″N 113°38′02″W
- Country: Canada
- Province: Alberta
- Region: Central Alberta
- Census division: 8
- Municipal district: Lacombe County

Government
  - Type: Unincorporated
  - Governing body: Lacombe County Council

Area (2021)
  - Land: 0.25 km^{2} (0.097 sq mi)

Population (2021)
  - Total: 85
  - Density: 339.3/km^{2} (879/sq mi)
- Time zone: UTC−06:00 (Alberta Time)
- Area codes: 403, 587, 825

Morningside is a hamlet in central Alberta, Canada, within Lacombe County. It is located just east of Highway 2 at the intersection of Highway 2A and Highway 604, approximately 36 kilometres (22 mi) north of Red Deer.

== Toponymy ==
Morningside was named after a suburb in Edinburgh, Scotland.

According to local tradition, the name was selected by a psychiatrist who hoped to establish a psychiatric hospital in the area, reminiscent of the Royal Edinburgh Hospital in the hamlet's Scottish namesake.

== Topography ==
Morningside's terrain is characterized by black chernozem soil originating from glaciolacustrine deposits. It is situated upon the Red Deer Plain, which falls within the aspen parkland.

=== Ecology ===
The Morningside area is home to fauna including moose, beavers, sharp-shinned hawks, Wilson's snipes, and ovenbirds. Flora in the area includes wild strawberries and marsh marigolds.

== History ==
=== Founding and development: 1892–1928 ===
Morningside was founded as a railway station in 1892 by the Calgary and Edmonton Railway. The railway's completion saw an influx of settlers who established farms and ranches. Morningside received a post office in January 1901 within its general store. The proprietor and postmaster allowed the space above the store to be used as an early school.

Over the next decade, Morningside expanded to host a boarding house and several commercial operations, including a pharmacy, creamery, and grain elevators. The community's Presbyterian parish built a church in 1904. A dedicated Morningside School followed in 1916, and Morningside United Church opened in 1925.

=== Great Depression and the remaining 20th century: 1929–2000 ===
Morningside's rapid development began to reverse during the Great Depression of the 1930s. Some businesses closed and nearly all the others burned down, at one point leaving the locality with only a hardware store. Morningside's church was also lost to fire damage in 1939, and it was not rebuilt.

Morningside School closed in 1953 due to falling enrolment. Passenger railway services were phased out in the 1970s, and Morningside United Church closed by the end of the decade. The Government of Alberta recognized Morningside as a hamlet on August 13, 1979.

Morningside's post office closed in January 1982. In 1985, the local Collett family sold 635 acres of land to the provincial government at a reduced rate, on the condition it would become a conservation area. The land subsequently became a provincial park named the JJ Collett Natural Area.

=== 21st century: 2001–present ===
In 2018, a group of local volunteers formed the Morningside Community Fundraising Committee to raise funds for a playground. Construction began in May 2020 and ended the same month.

== Demographics ==
Population history of Morningside
Year	Pop.	±%
1956	48	—
1961	72	+50.0%
1966	49	−31.9%
1971	52	+6.1%
1976	53	+1.9%
1981	61	+15.1%
1986	65	+6.6%
1991	68	+4.6%
1991A	68	+0.0%
1996	90	+32.4%
2001	97	+7.8%
2006	107	+10.3%
2011	95	−11.2%
2016	97	+2.1%
2021	85	−12.4%
Source: Statistics Canada

In the 2021 Census of Population conducted by Statistics Canada, Morningside had a population of 85 living in 48 of its 49 total private dwellings, a change of −12.4% from its 2016 population of 97. With a land area of 0.25 km^{2} (0.097 sq mi), it had a population density of 340.0/km^{2} (880.6/sq mi) in 2021.

As a designated place in the 2016 Census of Population conducted by Statistics Canada, Morningside had a population of 97 living in 39 of its 40 total private dwellings, a change of 2.1% from its 2011 population of 95. With a land area of 0.25 km^{2} (0.097 sq mi), it had a population density of 388.0/km^{2} (1,004.9/sq mi) in 2016.

== Services and recreation ==
=== Services ===
In January 2026, the provincial and federal governments announced plans to install high-speed Internet access to rural communities including Morningside by the end of the year.

=== Recreation ===
Morningside Community Hall serves as an event venue.

The JJ Collett Natural Area, which is accessible to the public, contains over 36 kilometres (22 mi) of hiking trails. A wheelchair-accessible path was introduced to the park in 2025.

== Notable people ==
- Earle Binley (1904–1995) – poet who spent the first seven years of his life in Morningside.
- John Dodds (1948–2005) – rodeo competitor who lived in Morningside during his career; inducted into the Canadian Pro Rodeo Hall of Fame in 1999.

== See also ==
- List of communities in Alberta
- List of designated places in Alberta
- List of hamlets in Alberta
