= Paul Greene =

Paul Greene may refer to:

- Paul Greene (actor) (born 1974), Canadian actor
- Paul Greene (athlete) (born 1972), Australian athlete and musician
- Paul Chet Greene, member of the Antigua and Barbuda House of Representatives

== See also ==
- Paul Green (disambiguation)
