= Smith, Alberta =

Smith
- Hamlet
- Location of Smith Smith (Alberta)
- Coordinates: 55°09′46″N 114°02′13″W
- Country: Canada
- Province: Alberta
- Region: Northern Alberta
- Census division: 17
- Municipal district: Municipal District of Lesser Slave River No. 124

Government
  - Type: Unincorporated
  - Governing body: Municipal District of Lesser Slave River No. 124 Council

Area (2021)
  - Land: 2.42 km^{2} (0.93 sq mi)

Population (2021)
  - Total: 227
  - Density: 93.7/km^{2} (243/sq mi)
- Time zone: UTC−06:00 (Alberta Time)
- Area codes: 780, 587, 825
- Waterways: Athabasca River, Lesser Slave River

Smith is a hamlet in northern Alberta, Canada, within the Municipal District of Lesser Slave River No. 124. It is located on Highway 2A, approximately 182 kilometres (113 mi) northwest of Edmonton, at the confluence of the Lesser Slave River and the Athabasca River.

== Toponymy ==
Smith is named for W. Rathbone Smith, general manager of the Edmonton, Dunvegan and British Columbia Railway when the community was established.

== History ==
=== Founding: 1914–1917 ===
Smith was first settled in 1914, when the Edmonton, Dunvegan and British Columbia Railway (later Northern Alberta Railways) established a divisional point in the area. The site was chosen for its position by the confluence of the Lesser Slave and Athabasca Rivers, on the north shore.

The community of Port Cornwall lay across the confluence, on the south shore. The locality was originally known as Mirror Landing, a name retained by its post office at the time Smith was founded.

Until Smith's establishment, Port Cornwall relied upon business from freight ships and travellers using the nearby rivers. The introduction of the railway ended Port Cornwall's utility as a hub for transit and commerce. Its post office subsequently relocated to Smith shortly after Smith's establishment, and Port Cornwall dissolved from village status in 1917.

=== Development: 1918–1967 ===
Smith School opened in 1925, using a building purchased from a resident. The community received a Catholic place of worship, the Church of St. James the Major, in 1920, and the Anglican Church of the Good Shepherd, in 1936.

A bridge was built over the confluence beside Smith in 1944, to accommodate vehicle traffic during the Second World War. Constructed by the US Army, Smith Bridge was expected to last for 75 years.

Smith received a dedicated schoolhouse in 1948, and the Mirror Landing post office finally changed its name to Smith in April 1957.

Smith's Mennonite community opened Bethany Christian Church in 1960, five miles south-east of the Smith townsite. The Church of St. James the Major burned down in 1966 and was replaced that same year with a new structure.

=== Failed township bid and remaining 20th century: 1968–2000 ===
Smith applied to the Alberta Municipal Government Board for town status in 1968. The request was ultimately declined after an economic feasibility study concluded that Smith was unlikely to attract new industries or expand current ones.

By 1970, Smith was situated at the junction of Highways 2 and 44. The Government of Alberta shortened Highway 44 in the early 1970s, connecting Slave Lake to Hondo directly below Smith. Although some residents were concerned that Smith could become a ghost town in the same way Port Cornwall had disappeared, Smith had developed a strong lumber industry by this time that protected its population and businesses.

Passenger rail services to Smith ended in 1974, and its railway station was torn down in 1983. Bethany Christian Church relocated inside Smith's borders in 1997.

=== 21st century: 2001–present ===
Smith received a new community hall, the Smith Community Complex and Arena, in 2015.

In 2022, residents of Smith raised concerns with provincial and municipal authorities around the integrity of Smith Bridge. Over time, the bridge's steel structure had taken damage and rusted in places. The Government of Alberta and the Municipal District of Lesser Slave River entered negotiations around a cost-sharing agreement to replace the bridge, which are nearing completion as of September 2026.

== Services ==
=== Education ===
Smith School teaches students from kindergarten to grade nine.

=== Recreation ===
The Smith Community Complex serves as an events venue and provides access to free outdoor skating facilities in the winter. The Smith-Hondo Agricultural Society hosts an annual rodeo and fair, the Smith-Hondo Fall Fair.

=== Places of worship ===
As of 2026, St. James the Major hosts services for Catholic congregants on the second Sunday of every month. Bethany Christian Church also remains in regular use.

== Places of interest ==
=== Historic cemeteries ===
Smith contains Smith Community Cemetery and St. James the Major Cemetery, in which veterans of the First and Second World Wars are interred.

== Demographics ==
Population history of Smith
Year	Pop.	±%
1941	90	—
1951	192	+113.3%
1956	271	+41.1%
1961	86	−68.3%
1966	133	+54.7%
1971	445	+234.6%
1976	353	−20.7%
1981	216	−38.8%
1986	251	+16.2%
1991	258	+2.8%
1991A	263	+1.9%
1996	264	+0.4%
2001	262	−0.8%
2006	229	−12.6%
2011	218	−4.8%
2016	148	−32.1%
2021	227	+53.4%
Source: Statistics Canada

In the 2021 Census of Population conducted by Statistics Canada, Smith had a population of 227 living in 90 of its 101 total private dwellings, a change of 53.4% from its 2016 population of 148. With a land area of 2.42 km^{2} (0.93 sq mi), it had a population density of 93.8/km^{2} (242.9/sq mi) in 2021.

As a designated place in the 2016 Census of Population conducted by Statistics Canada, Smith had a population of 148 living in 55 of its 76 total private dwellings, a change of −32.1% from its 2011 population of 218. With a land area of 2.45 km^{2} (0.95 sq mi), it had a population density of 60.4/km^{2} (156.5/sq mi) in 2016.

== See also ==
- List of communities in Alberta
- List of designated places in Alberta
- List of hamlets in Alberta
