= Paul Green (drug dealer) =

British drug dealer

Paul Green is a British drug dealer convicted in 2024 of smuggling up to £7bn worth of drugs by street value. Green, a resident of Widnes, was sentenced to 32 years in custody for his role in running an international drug supply network primarily running between Amstelveen, Netherlands, and the United Kingdom.

Drugs were disguised as vegetables, with onions and other strong-smelling items used to conceal the smell of the contraband.
