= Heritage Pointe =

- Hamlet
- Location of Heritage Pointe Heritage Pointe (Canada)
- Coordinates: 50.841°N 114.004°W
- Country: Canada
- Province: Alberta
- Region: Calgary Metropolitan Region
- Census division: 6
- Municipal district: Foothills County

Government
  - Type: Unincorporated
  - Governing body: Foothills County Council

Area
  - Land: 4.78 km^{2} (1.85 sq mi)

Population (2021)
  - Total: 1,974
  - Density: 413/km^{2} (1,070/sq mi)
- Time zone: UTC−06:00 (Alberta Time)
- Area codes: 403, 587, 825
- Highways: Highway 2, Highway 2A
- Waterways: Pine Creek

Heritage Pointe is a hamlet located in Alberta, Canada within Foothills County. It is located north of Dunbow Road, between Highway 2 (Deerfoot Trail) and Highway 2A (MacLeod Trail), adjacent to the southern boundary of Calgary. The community was developed beginning in the early 1990s around the Heritage Pointe Golf Club and a private lake. It had a population of 1,974 in the 2021 census.

== History ==
Development of Heritage Pointe began in 1991 with the Heritage Pointe Golf Course and clubhouse and four residential development areas. The golf course opened in 1992. The project was led by developer Carolina Oxtoby of Heritage Pointe Properties.

The Municipal District of Foothills No. 31 (now Foothills County) adopted the Heritage Pointe Area Structure Plan as Bylaw 97/94 on September 28, 1995. A 2004 amendment (Bylaw 80/2004) revised the plan boundary. The amended plan covers approximately 892 acres (361 ha) and allocates land for residential development, a golf course, a 28-acre (11 ha) lake and associated amenities, commercial uses, parks and natural open space, with the potential for up to 698 housing units.

In March 2021, county council gave first reading to an amendment to the area structure plan for Serenity, a residential area between the hamlet's commercial district and The Ravine community. Following discussions with neighbouring residents, the proposal was reduced from 87 to 65 homes and row housing was removed. In 2024, the Lake at Heritage Pointe Owners Association applied to redesignate a 2.46-acre (1.00 ha) parcel from residential to open space to reflect its use as a community park and playground.

South of Dunbow Road, Foothills County adopted the Heritage Estates Area Structure Plan (Bylaw 50/2025) on August 27, 2025, for a 15-acre (6.1 ha) residential area.

== Geography ==
Heritage Pointe lies immediately south of the Calgary city limits, east of Highway 2 and north of Dunbow Road. The valley of Pine Creek, a tributary of the Bow River, runs through the community.

== Demographics ==
Population history of Heritage Pointe
Year	Pop.	±%
2011	2,041	—
2016	2,075	+1.7%
2021	1,974	−4.9%
Source: Statistics Canada

In the 2021 Census of Population, the urban population centre of Heritage Pointe, as delineated by Statistics Canada, recorded a population of 1,974 living in 707 of its 726 total private dwellings, a change of −4.9% from its 2016 population of 2,075. With a land area of 4.78 km^{2} (1.85 sq mi), it had a population density of 413.0/km^{2} (1,069.6/sq mi) in 2021.

In the 2016 Census of Population conducted by Statistics Canada, Heritage Pointe recorded a population of 2,075 living in 710 of its 721 total private dwellings, a 1.7% change from its 2011 population of 2,041. With a land area of 4.78 km^{2} (1.85 sq mi), it had a population density of 434.1/km^{2} (1,124.3/sq mi) in 2016.

== Recreation ==
Heritage Pointe Golf Club is a 27-hole semi-private facility designed by American architect Ron Garl. It is owned and operated by Windmill Golf Group. Its three nine-hole courses, the Heritage, Pointe and Desert, opened on the same day in 1992 and are played in three par-72 combinations of 6,869 to 7,093 yards (6,281 to 6,486 m). The Heritage and Pointe nines follow the Pine Creek valley, while the links-style Desert nine sits on open prairie at the entrance to the property. The Desert–Heritage combination has appeared on SCOREGolf's rankings of Canada's top courses, and the club was listed among SCOREGolf's top 50 public courses in Canada in 2021.

=== Tournaments ===
The club hosted the Calgary Open, an event on the Canadian Tour (the predecessor of PGA Tour Canada), in each of its four editions from 1997 to 2000.

In July 2026, Heritage Pointe co-hosted the 121st Canadian Men's Amateur Championship with Mickelson National Golf Club, staging the first two rounds of the championship and the concurrent Willingdon Cup inter-provincial team competition. Dawson Lew won the championship at Mickelson National.

=== Driving range ===
In January 2021, county council redesignated golf course land from agricultural to recreational use to permit LaunchPad, a year-round, two-level driving range facility with 40 hitting bays. Some residents objected, citing traffic, noise, lighting and the level of public consultation; the county stated that its notification met requirements. Construction began in June 2021.

=== Lake ===
The community includes a private lake and associated amenity area.

== Infrastructure ==
=== Water and wastewater ===
Because Heritage Pointe is outside Calgary's boundary, it did not have access to the city's water supply. The developer obtained a provincial licence to draw water from the Bow River and established a utility to serve the community and golf course. A 2006 provincial moratorium on new water licences in the South Saskatchewan River basin, which includes the Bow River, limits access to new licences for further development in the area.

The utility draws water through an intake and pump house on the Bow River. During the 2013 Alberta floods, the river eroded the bank around the intake up to the edge of the pump house, although service was not interrupted. The province provided a $400,000 grant from its Flood Recovery and Erosion Control Program to cover the bank repairs carried out by the operator, Corix Utilities. As of 2026, the system is operated by Bluestem Utilities, a member of Nexus Water Group, which provides potable water, wastewater and irrigation water service.

=== Emergency services ===
The Heritage Pointe Fire Hall, next to the hamlet's commercial centre, opened on September 4, 2012. The Municipal District of Foothills began planning the hall in 2009 after the City of Calgary announced it would stop providing fire coverage to the northern part of the municipality. Built at a cost of nearly $4.2 million, it was the municipality's first fire hall staffed 24 hours a day and serves Heritage Pointe, De Winton and the Dunbow Road area. It is the Foothills Fire Department station for District 9.

== See also ==
- List of communities in Alberta
- List of hamlets in Alberta
