= Connemara, Alberta =

Locality in Alberta, Canada

Coordinates: 50.40008°N 113.81866°W

Location of Connemara in Alberta

Connemara is a locality in Alberta, Canada within Foothills County. The locality takes its name from Connemara, in Ireland.
