= Cayley, Alberta =

Cayley
- Hamlet
- Location of Cayley in Alberta
- Coordinates: 50.4481°N 113.8472°W
- Country: Canada
- Province: Alberta
- Census division: No. 6
- Municipal district: Foothills County

Government
  - Type: Unincorporated
  - Reeve: Rob Siewert
  - Governing body: M.D. of Foothills Council: Suzanne Oel; Benita Estes; Laura Kendall; Alan Alger; John Callister; RD McHugh; Rob Siewert

Area (2021)
  - Land: 0.62 km^{2} (0.24 sq mi)

Population (2021)
  - Total: 414
  - Density: 672.7/km^{2} (1,742/sq mi)
- Time zone: UTC−06:00 (Alberta Time)

Cayley is a hamlet in southern Alberta, Canada within the Foothills County. It is also recognized as a designated place by Statistics Canada.

Cayley is approximately 73 kilometres (45 mi) south of Calgary, 13 kilometres (8.1 mi) south of High River and 1.2 kilometres (0.75 mi) west of Highway 2 on Range Road 290 (former designated as Highway 2A). It is located within Census Division No. 6.

== History ==
The community was named for the Hon. Hugh St. Quentin Cayley, a barrister and the publisher of the Calgary Herald in 1884, who also represented Calgary in the Northwest Territories legislature from 1886 to 1894. The hamlet originally contained at least seven grain elevators; all have been demolished. Cayley is also home to a Hutterite colony and a colony school; in 2001, two Cayley Colony girls were the first students from an Alberta colony school to write provincial diploma exams and graduate from high school.

=== Incorporation history ===
Previously incorporated as a village on August 4, 1904, Cayley dissolved to hamlet status on June 1, 1996.

== Demographics ==
Historical population
Year	Pop.	±%
1926 {est.}	135	—
1936	135	+0.0%
2011	265	+96.3%
2016	340	+28.3%
2021	414	+21.8%

In the 2021 Census of Population conducted by Statistics Canada, Cayley had a population of 414 living in 166 of its 170 total private dwellings, a change of 9.8% from its 2016 population of 377. With a land area of 0.62 km^{2} (0.24 sq mi), it had a population density of 667.7/km^{2} (1,729.4/sq mi) in 2021.

As a designated place in the 2016 Census of Population conducted by Statistics Canada, Cayley had a population of 340 living in 143 of its 143 total private dwellings, a change of 28.3% from its 2011 population of 265. With a land area of 0.48 km^{2} (0.19 sq mi), it had a population density of 708.3/km^{2} (1,834.6/sq mi) in 2016.

== See also ==
- List of communities in Alberta
- List of designated places in Alberta
- List of former urban municipalities in Alberta
- List of hamlets in Alberta
