= Diamond Valley, Alberta =

Diamond Valley
- Town
- Town of Diamond Valley
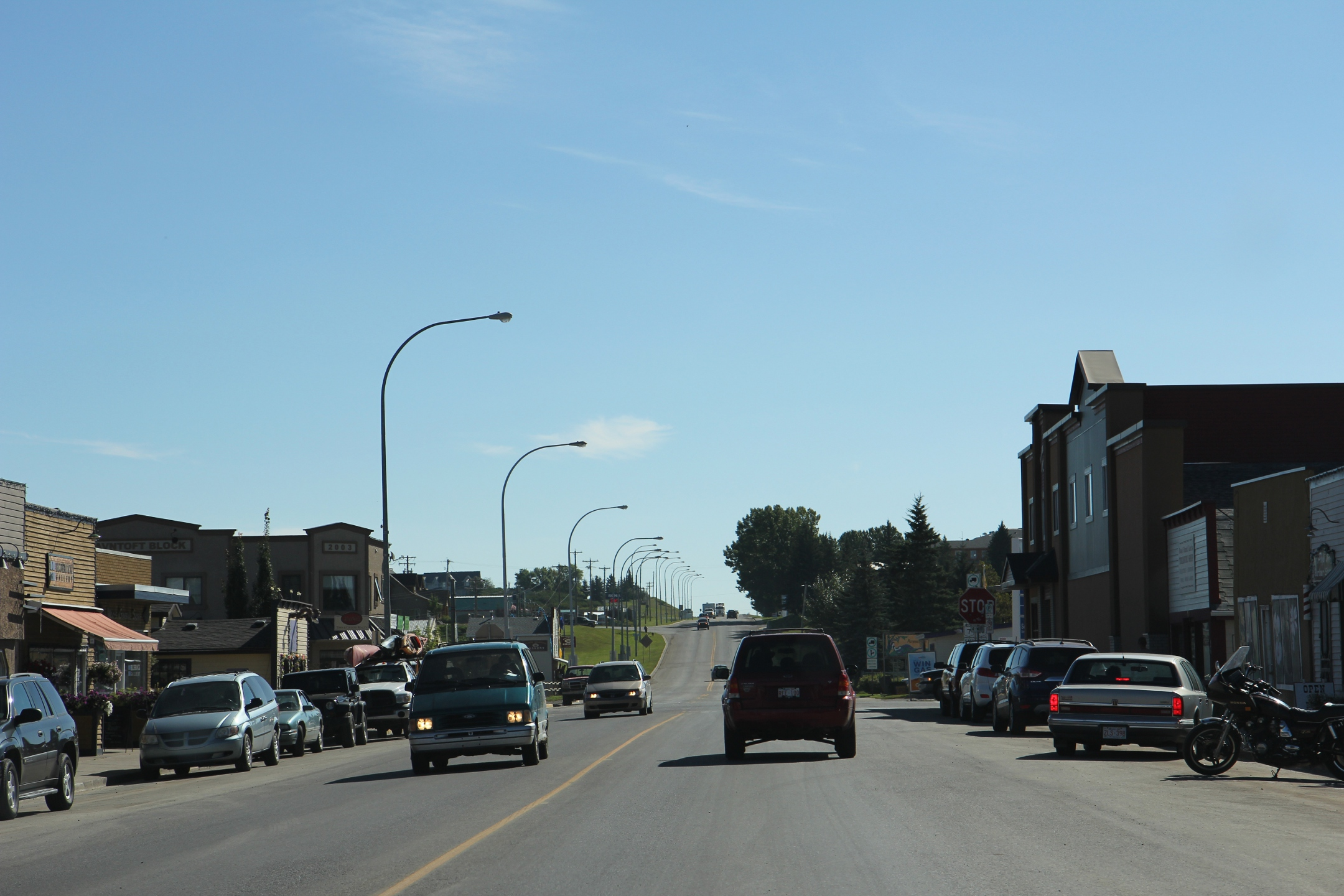
- Highway 22 in downtown Black Diamond

- Location of Diamond Valley Diamond Valley (Canada)
- Coordinates: 50.676°N 114.260°W
- Country: Canada
- Province: Alberta
- Region: Calgary Metropolitan Region
- Census division: 6
- Municipal district: Foothills County
- Village (BD): May 8, 1929
- Village (TV): February 23, 1930
- Town (BD): January 1, 1956
- Town (TV): September 1, 1977
- Amalgamated: January 1, 2023

Government
  - Mayor: Brendan Kelly
  - Governing body: Diamond Valley Town Council
  - CAO: Adam Davey

Area (2021)
  - Land: 12.57 km^{2} (4.85 sq mi)
- Elevation: 1,159–1,215 m (3,802–3,986 ft)

Population (2021)
  - Total: 5,341
  - Density: 424.9/km^{2} (1,100/sq mi)
- Time zone: UTC−06:00 (Alberta Time)
- Postal code span: T0L
- Area code: +1-403
- Highways: Highway 22; Highway 7
- Waterways: Sheep River
- Website: Official website

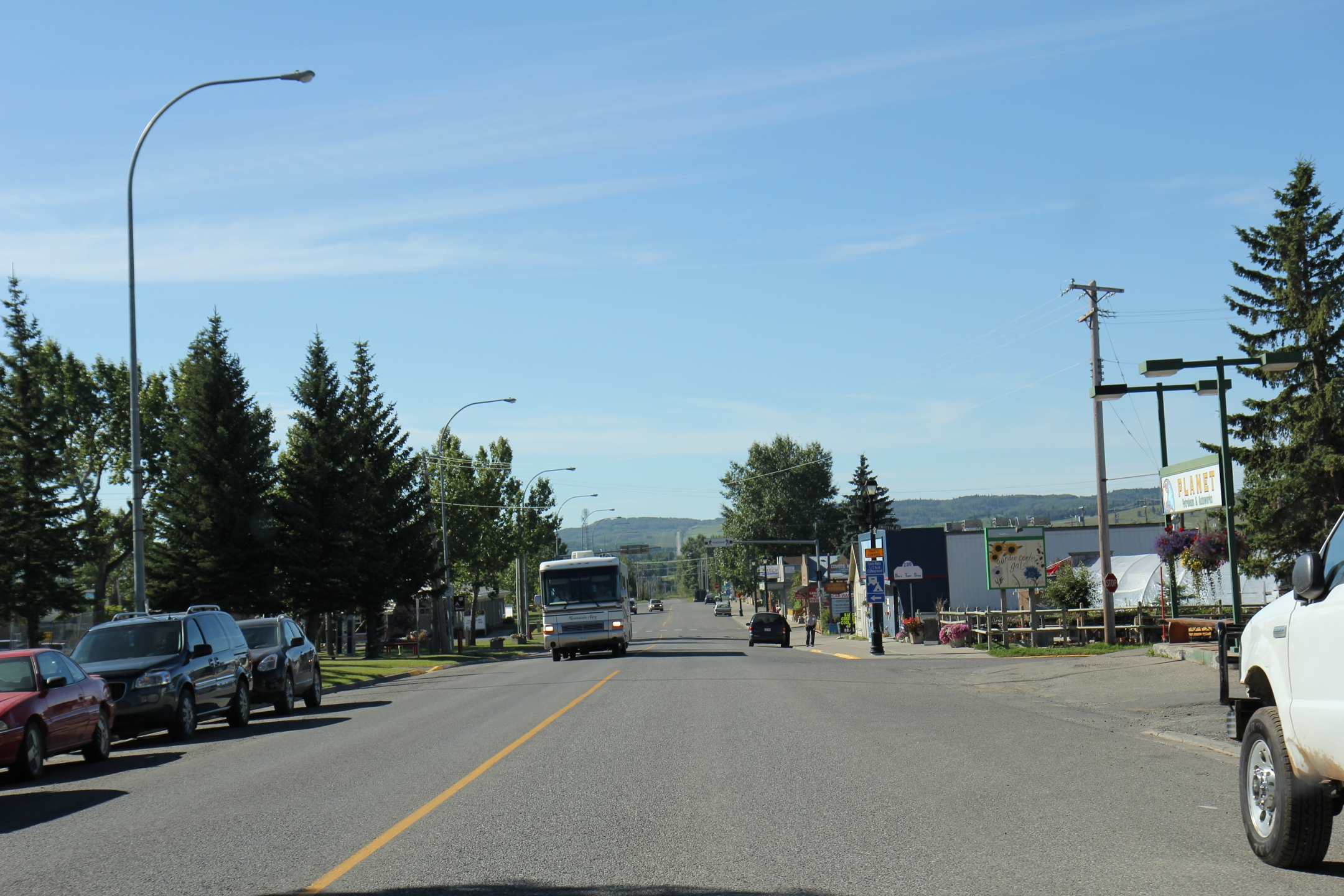
Looking south in Turner Valley

Diamond Valley is a town in the Calgary Metropolitan Region of Alberta, Canada within Foothills County. It is at the intersection of Highway 22 (Cowboy Trail) and Highway 7. It was established through the amalgamation of the former towns of Black Diamond and Turner Valley on January 1, 2023.

Diamond Valley is home to several local businesses, including the Black Diamond Hotel and the Chuckwagon Cafe, which was featured on the television series You Gotta Eat Here!.

== History ==
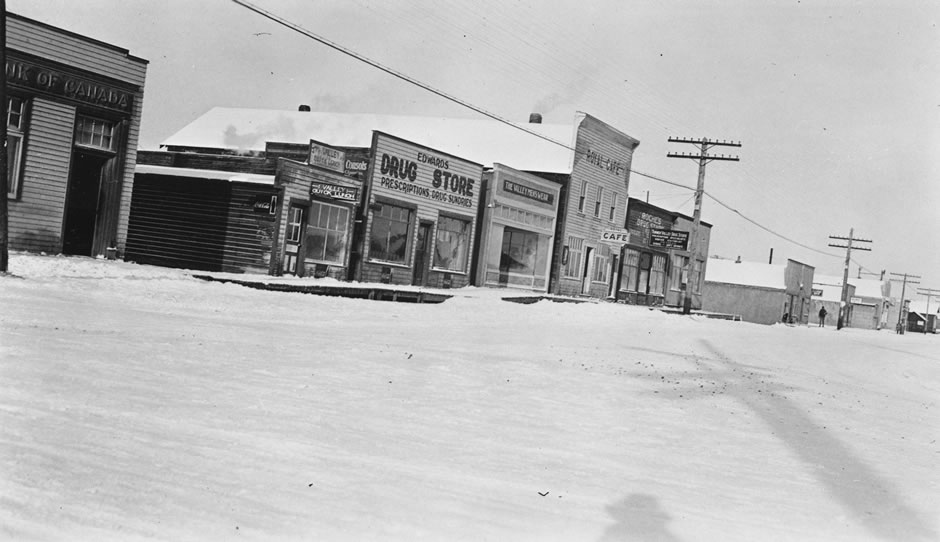
Turner Valley, 1932

Black Diamond and Turner Valley incorporated as villages on May 8, 1929 and February 23, 1930 respectively. After nearly 26 years as a village, Black Diamond incorporated as a town on January 1, 1956. Turner Valley incorporated as a town on September 1, 1977 after 47 years of village status.

The thought of amalgamating the towns of Black Diamond and Turner Valley first surfaced in the mid-1980s. Turner Valley withdrew from the discussions after Alberta Municipal Affairs completed a feasibility report on the amalgamation in 1986.

The possibility resurfaced in 2006 when the towns initiated discussions on a possible amalgamation of the two municipalities. The discussions culminated in a plebiscite held on October 15, 2007, concurrently with their municipal elections, in which the question asked of voters was "Do you support an amalgamation of the Town of Black Diamond and the Town of Turner Valley to form one municipality?" The results of the plebiscite were 66% of Turner Valley voters were in favour of amalgamation, while 71% of Black Diamond voters were against amalgamation.

A third amalgamation investigation began in early 2016 through a joint request of Black Diamond and Turner Valley for a provincial grant to undertake a feasibility study. Following negotiations and engagement, the two town councils decided to proceed with an amalgamation application in September 2021. The name of the amalgamated municipality was proposed to be the Town of Diamond Valley. Among over 200 name suggestions, Diamond Valley received the majority of responses in a survey of three shortlisted suggestions; the other two being Sheep River and Black Valley. The proposed effective date of the amalgamation was January 1, 2023. On May 25, 2022, the Government of Alberta approved the amalgamation application with the municipality name and effective date as originally proposed. On November 28, 2022, both towns voted for their new town's first mayor and council with Turner Valley's last mayor Barry Crane being elected Diamond Valley's first mayor.

== Demographics ==
The combined population of the towns of Black Diamond and Turner Valley, according to the 2021 Census of Population conducted by Statistics Canada, is 5,341, up from 5,264 in 2016. The two towns have a combined land area of 12.57 km^{2} (4.85 sq mi).

Black Diamond
In 2021, the Town of Black Diamond had a population of 2,730 living in 1,178 of its 1,233 total private dwellings, a change of 0.9% from its 2016 population of 2,705. With a land area of 6.82 km^{2} (2.63 sq mi), it had a population density of 400.3/km^{2} (1,036.8/sq mi) in 2021.

Turner Valley
In 2021, the Town of Turner Valley had a population of 2,611 living in 1,073 of its 1,133 total private dwellings, a change of 2% from its 2016 population of 2,559. With a land area of 5.75 km^{2} (2.22 sq mi), it had a population density of 454.1/km^{2} (1,176.1/sq mi) in 2021.

== Government ==
The Town of Diamond Valley has a seven-person council comprising a mayor and six councillors all elected at-large. The first election occurred on November 28, 2022. Its first chief administrative officer (CAO) was Shawn Patience, who was the CAO of the Town of Turner Valley.

The first council of Diamond Valley, based on the official results of the election, held November 28, 2022:

- Mayor, Barry Crane
- Councillor, Jonathan Gordon
- Councillor, Cindy Holladay
- Councillor, Brendan Kelly
- Councillor, Veronica Kloiber
- Councillor, Hazel Martin
- Councillor, Heather Thomson

== See also ==
- List of communities in Alberta
- List of former urban municipalities in Alberta
- List of municipal amalgamations in Alberta
- List of towns in Alberta
