= Street value =

Market value of contraband

In crime and policing, street value or street price is the notional value of contraband in the target market in its finished state. It is generally applied to narcotics, including prescription drugs.

In the case of cannabis, street value may be based on extrapolation from plants at an early stage of growth. This may even include growing the plants to harvest to assess factors such as THC content, as a counter to defendants' claims that seized crops were of poor quality or unlikely to mature.

The street value is an estimate based on intelligence kept by enforcement agencies and open source resources.
