= Turner Valley =

- Former town
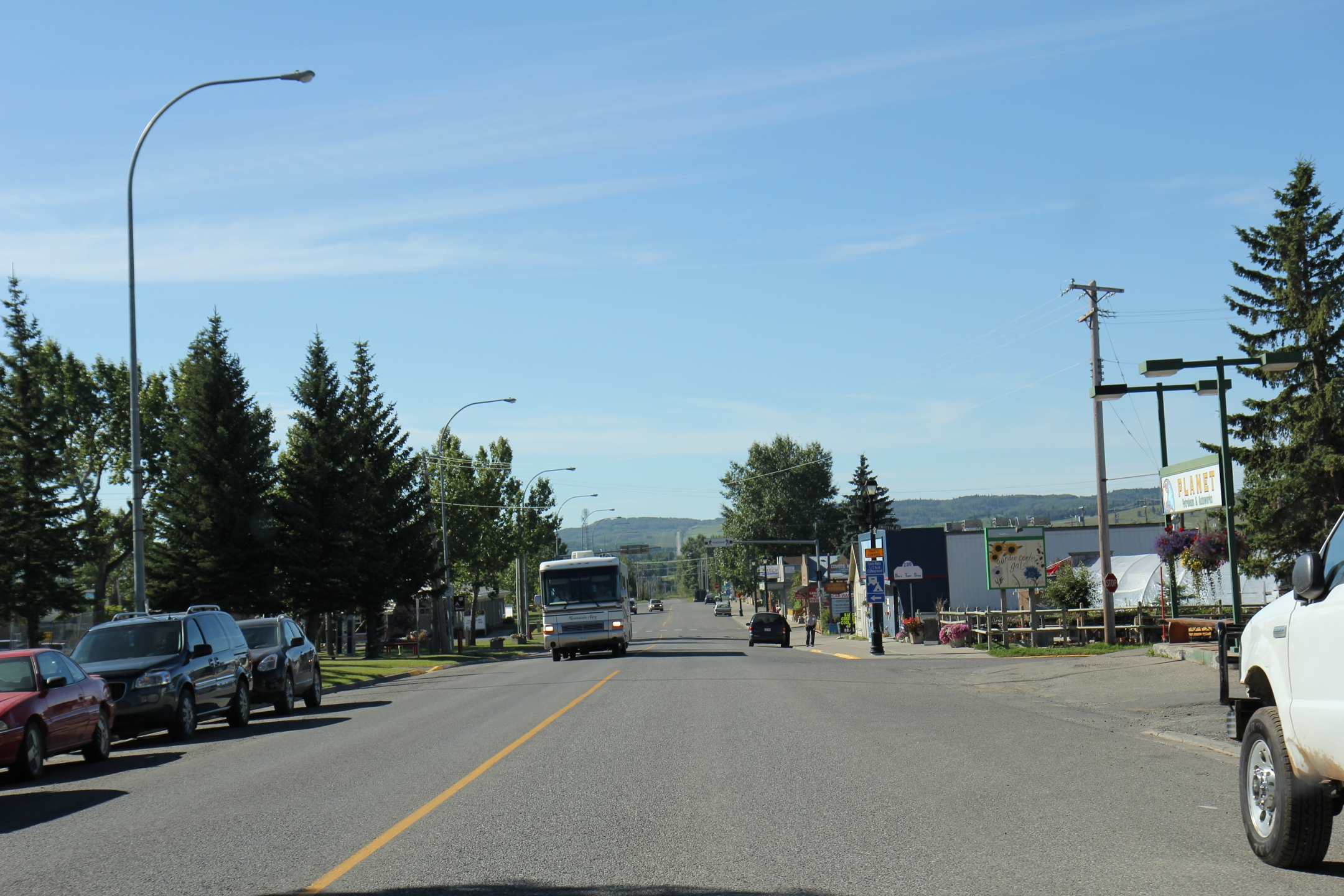
- Looking south in Turner Valley

- Location of Turner Valley in Alberta
- Coordinates: 50°40′26″N 114°16′43″W
- Country: Canada
- Province: Alberta
- Region: Calgary Region
- Census division: No. 6
- Town: Diamond Valley
- Incorporated
  - Village: February 23, 1930
  - Town: September 1, 1977
- Amalgamated: January 1, 2023

Government
  - Governing body: Diamond Valley Town Council

Area (2021)
  - Land: 5.75 km^{2} (2.22 sq mi)
- Elevation: 1,215 m (3,986 ft)

Population (2021)
  - Total: 2,611
  - Density: 453.7/km^{2} (1,175/sq mi)
- Time zone: UTC−06:00 (Alberta Time)
- Postal Code: T0L 2A0
- Area codes: 403, 587, 825, 368
- Highways: Highway 7 Highway 22; Highway 546
- Waterways: Sheep River
- Website: turnervalley.ca

Turner Valley was a town in the Calgary Metropolitan Region of Alberta, Canada that is now within the Town of Diamond Valley. It is on Highway 22 (Cowboy Trail), 3 km (1.9 mi) west of Black Diamond and approximately 60 km (37 mi) southwest of Calgary. It was named after Robert and John Turner who settled in the area in 1886.

The town was once the centre of an oil and natural gas boom. For 30 years, the Turner Valley oilfields were a major supplier of oil and gas and the largest producer in the British Empire.

== History ==
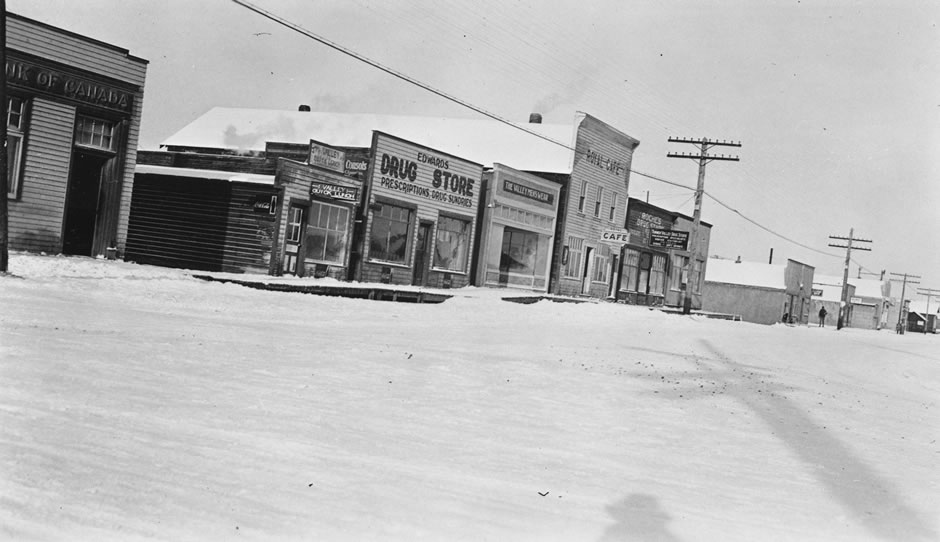
Turner Valley, 1932

Turner Valley incorporated as a village on February 23, 1930. After 47 years as a village, Turner Valley incorporated as a town on September 1, 1977. On January 1, 2023, the Town of Turner Valley amalgamated with its neighbouring Town of Black Diamond to form the Town of Diamond Valley.

On May 25, 2022, the Province of Alberta issued an Order in Council to amalgamate Black Diamond and Turner Valley to form the new Town of Diamond Valley, with an incorporation date of January 1, 2023.

This followed decades of talk and a 2007 plebiscite that saw Turner Valley citizens embrace amalgamation and Black Diamond residents reject it.

Ultimately, the prospect of efficiencies and possible cost savings of $1 million a year became a major catalyst to approving the merger without a plebiscite.

On January 1, 2023, the Town of Black Diamond amalgamated with its neighbouring Town of Turner Valley to form the Town of Diamond Valley.

Turner Valley Gas Plant

W. Stewart Herron, a rancher from nearby Okotoks, gathered investors from local contacts such as James Lougheed, R.B. Bennett and A.E. Cross. Herron himself lacked the technical expertise to drill Turner Valley's fossil-fuel that was some 800 m (2,600 ft) underground. Herron recruited drilling expert Archibald Dingman, a 19th-century American veteran from Pennsylvania.

On May 14, 1914, A.W. Dingman struck wet natural gas, which produced gasoline. However, in 1920, the main buildings burned to the ground. Herron's group could not afford to rebuild and operate the site. Imperial Oil bought Calgary Petroleum Products, created a subsidiary named Royalite Oil Co., and rebuilt the plant.

The plant ceased operations in 1985 and with the encouragement of a local group, the Turner Valley Oilfield Society, and the most recent owner of the gas plant, the Alberta provincial government, accepted the site as part of its group of historic sites. Since that time Alberta Culture has been at work on the Turner Valley Gas Plant, primarily stabilizing the facility and removing or mitigating the contaminants on the site. In 2014, Alberta Culture held a celebration on May 14, 2014, on the day of the centennial of the discovery of oil on the site. More than 2,000 people attended this full day of events. It is estimated that, along with the $20 million spent on restoring the site, an additional $20 million will be needed to help get the site operational.

=== Amalgamation ===
On May 25, 2022, the Province of Alberta issued an order in council to amalgamate Turner Valley and Black Diamond to form the new Town of Diamond Valley, with an incorporation date of January 1, 2023.

This followed decades of talk and a 2007 plebiscite that saw Turner Valley citizens embrace amalgamation and Black Diamond residents reject it.

Ultimately, the prospect of efficiencies and possible cost savings of $1 million a year became a major catalyst to approving the merger without a plebiscite, and on January 1, 2023, the Town of Black Diamond amalgamated with its neighbouring Town of Turner Valley to form the Town of Diamond Valley.

== Demographics ==
In the 2021 Census of Population conducted by Statistics Canada, the Town of Turner Valley had a population of 2,611 living in 1,073 of its 1,133 total private dwellings, a change of 2% from its 2016 population of 2,559. With a land area of 5.75 km^{2} (2.22 sq mi), it had a population density of 454.1/km^{2} (1,176.1/sq mi) in 2021.

In the 2016 Census of Population conducted by Statistics Canada, the Town of Turner Valley recorded a population of 2,559 living in 1,019 of its 1,066 total private dwellings, a change of 18.1% from its 2011 population of 2,167. With a land area of 5.79 km^{2} (2.24 sq mi), it had a population density of 442.0/km^{2} (1,144.7/sq mi) in 2016.

The population of the Town of Turner Valley according to its 2015 municipal census is 2,511, a change of 24.2% from its 2008 municipal census population of 2,022.

== Attractions ==
Kananaskis Country, approximately 25 km (16 mi) to the west, offers camping, hiking, cross-country skiing, horseback riding, fishing and bird watching.

Recreation venues include the 18-hole semi-private Turner Valley Golf and Country Club, outdoor Dr. Lander Memorial Pool, an outdoor rink and skateboard park, and Friendship Trail, 3 km (1.9 mi) paved link to nearby Black Diamond.

== Government ==
Turner Valley was governed by a town council of seven including a mayor and six councillors. The final mayor of the Town of Turner Valley was Barry Crane.

== Education ==
Students in kindergarten through grade 6 attend Turner Valley Elementary School. Junior and senior high school students attend Oilfields High School in Black Diamond.

== Notable people ==
- Laureen Harper, wife of former Prime Minister Stephen Harper
- Dwight Lodeweges, former professional soccer player
- Stanley A. Milner, Canadian businessman and former politician

== Gallery ==
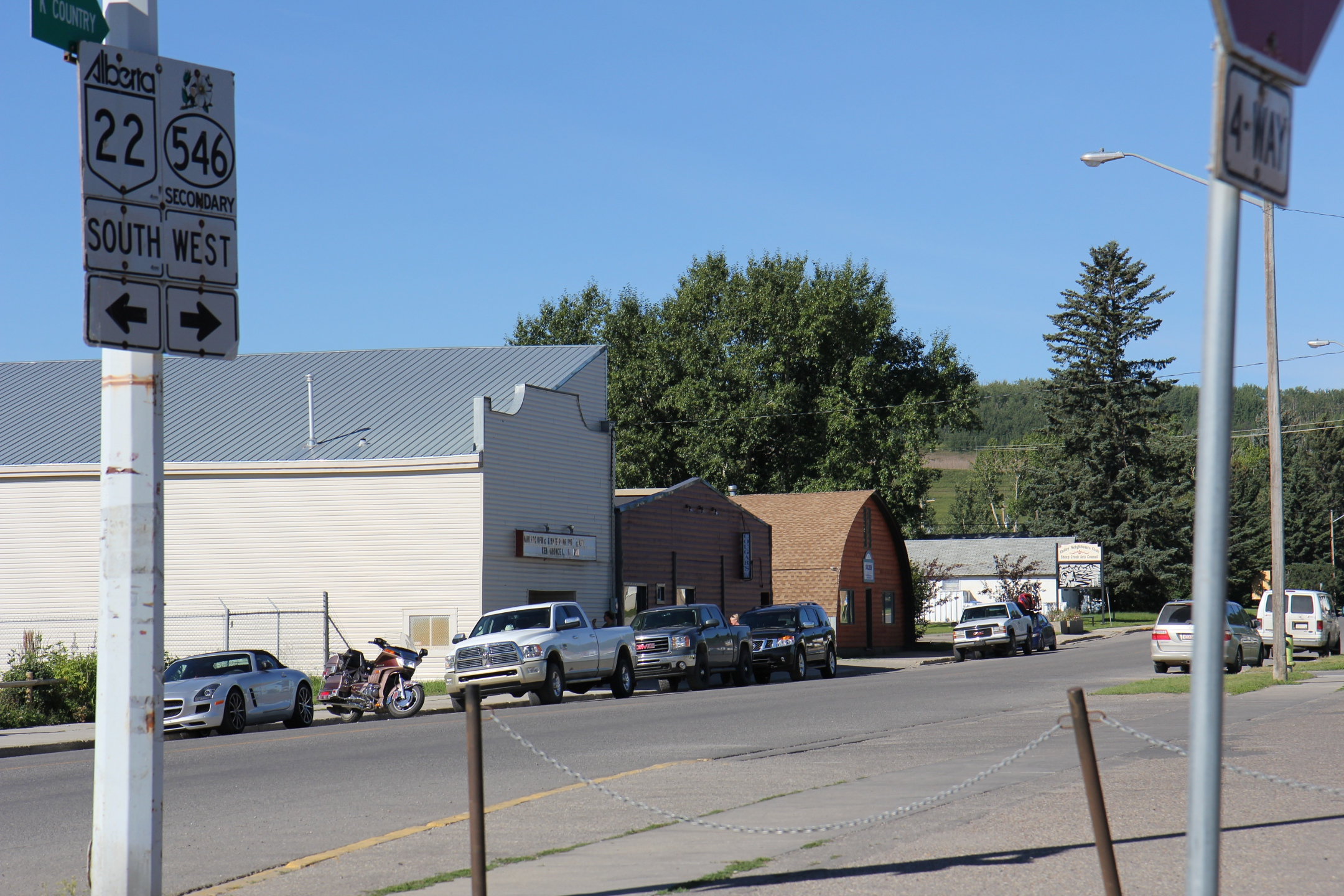
Looking west in Turner Valley

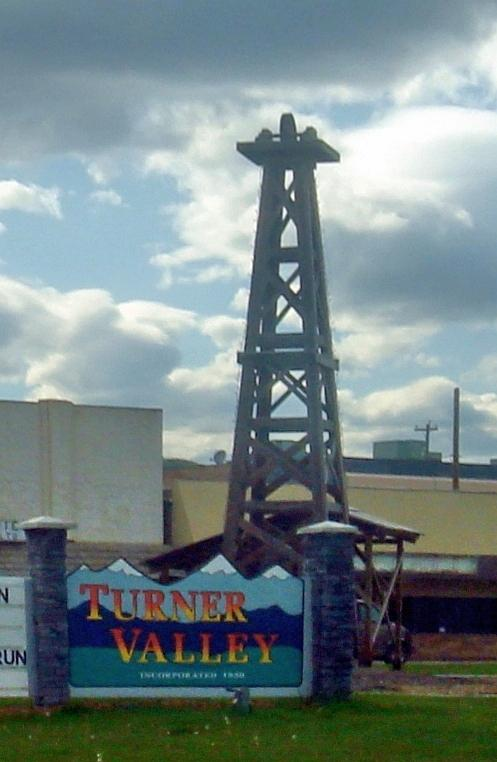
Welcome sign

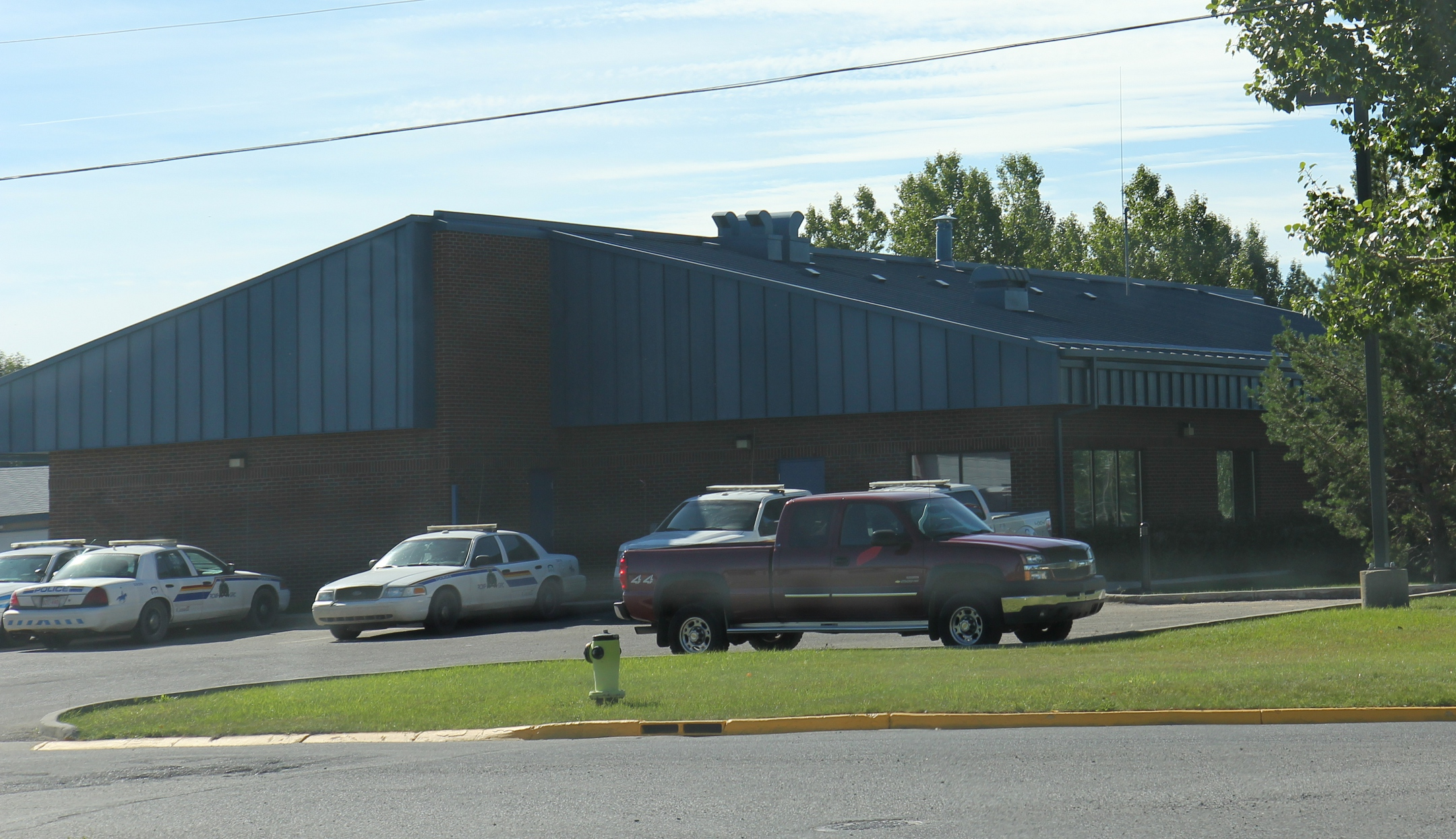
Police station

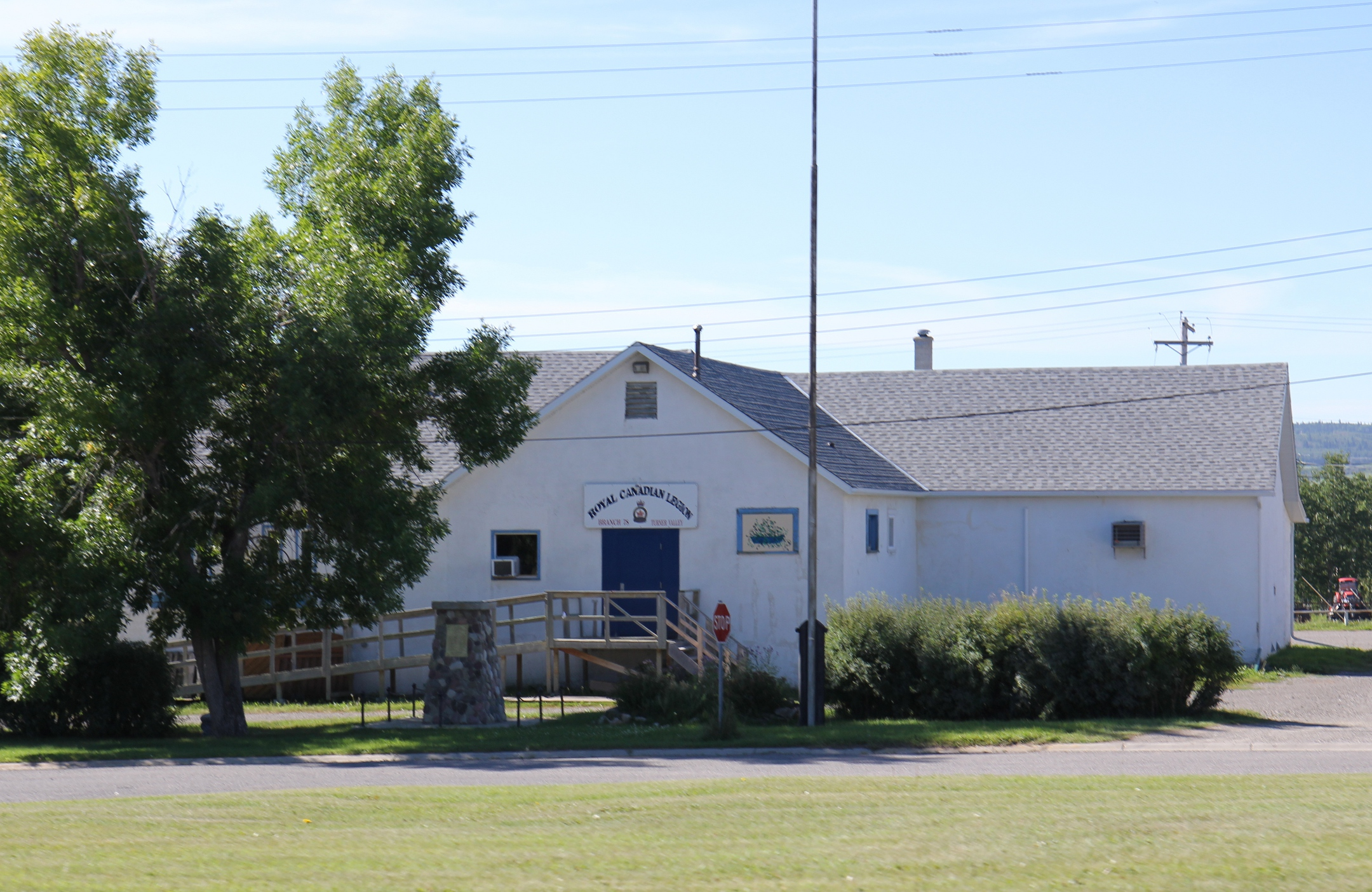
Royal Canadian Legion building

== See also ==
- List of communities in Alberta
- List of towns in Alberta
- Turner Valley Formation
