= Black Diamond, Alberta =

Black Diamond
- Former town
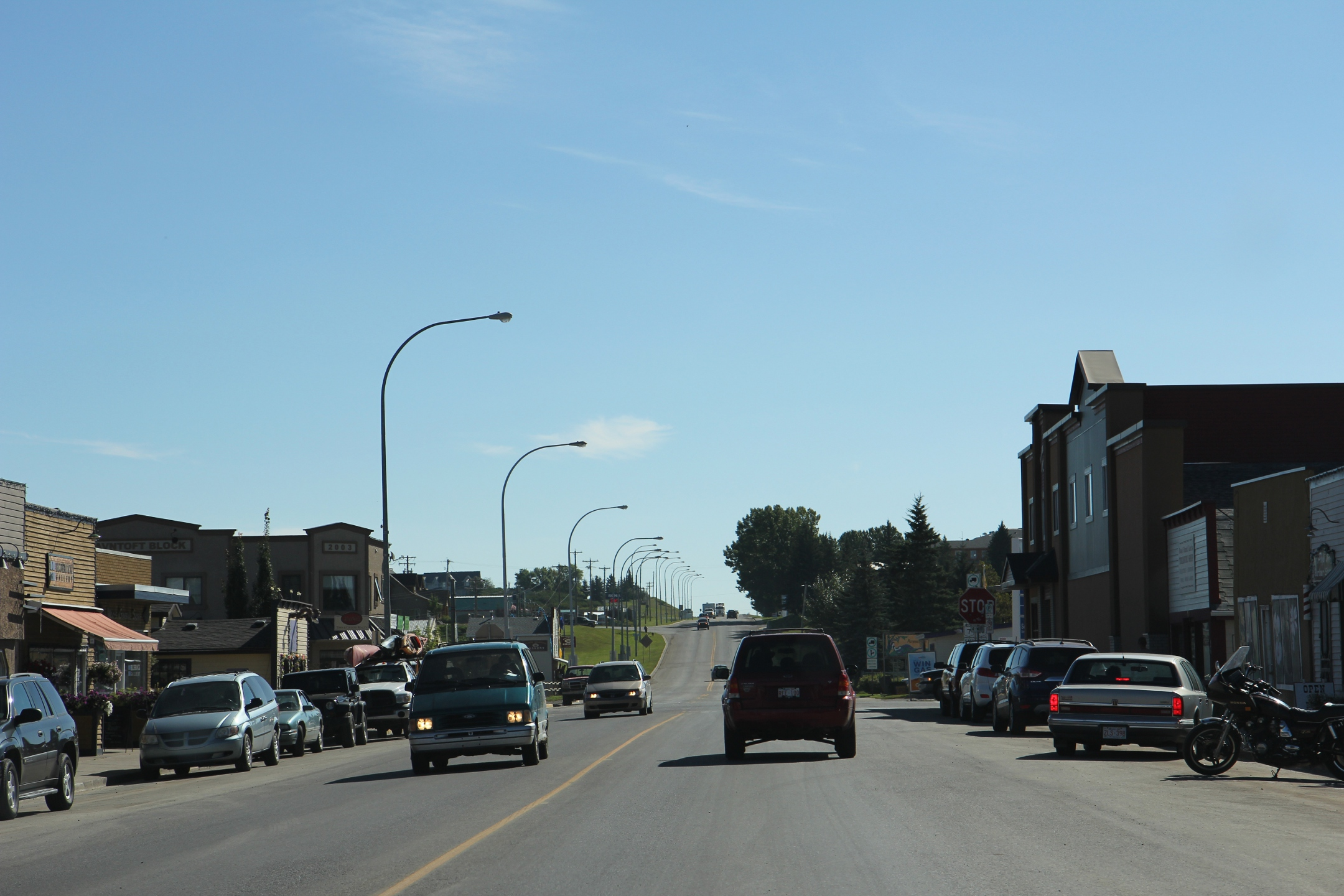
- Downtown Black Diamond on Alberta Highway 22

- Location of Black Diamond Black Diamond (Canada)
- Coordinates: 50°41′17″N 114°14′00″W
- Country: Canada
- Province: Alberta
- Region: Calgary Metropolitan Region
- Census division: 6
- Town: Diamond Valley
- Incorporated
  - Village: May 8, 1929
  - Town: January 1, 1956
- Amalgamated: January 1, 2023

Government
  - Governing body: Diamond Valley Town Council

Area (2021)
  - Land: 6.82 km^{2} (2.63 sq mi)
- Elevation: 1,159 m (3,802 ft)

Population (2021)
  - Total: 2,730
  - Density: 400.4/km^{2} (1,037/sq mi)
- Time zone: UTC−06:00 (Alberta Time)
- Postal code span: T0L
- Area codes: 403, 587, 825, 368
- Highways: Highway 22; Highway 7
- Waterways: Sheep River
- Website: town.blackdiamond.ab.ca (archived December 29, 2022)

Black Diamond is a town in the Calgary Metropolitan Region of Alberta, Canada that is now within municipality of Diamond Valley. It is at the intersection of Highway 22 (Cowboy Trail) and Highway 7. Its first post office opened in 1907. Black Diamond is named because of coal deposits near the original town site. Little oil or gas remains.

It is a sister town to Turner Valley, and has a hospital, shops, hotels and residences, elementary school (K-6th grade), high school (7th-12th grade), hockey rink and a Boys and Girls Club.

Black Diamond is located in the foothills of the Canadian Rockies in the midst of some of Canada's best ranch country.

A 3 km (1.9 mi) trail next to the roadway between Black Diamond and Turner Valley is named the Friendship Trail.

== History ==
Black Diamond incorporated as a village on May 8, 1929. After nearly 26 years as a village, Black Diamond incorporated as a town on January 1, 1956.

On May 25, 2022, the Province of Alberta issued an order in council to amalgamate Black Diamond and Turner Valley to form the new Town of Diamond Valley, with an incorporation date of January 1, 2023.

This followed decades of talk and a 2007 plebiscite that saw Turner Valley citizens embrace amalgamation and Black Diamond residents reject it.

Ultimately, the prospect of efficiencies, and possible cost savings of $1 million a year became a major catalyst to approving the merger without a plebiscite.

On January 1, 2023, the Town of Black Diamond amalgamated with its neighbouring Town of Turner Valley to form the Town of Diamond Valley.

== Demographics ==
In the 2021 Census of Population conducted by Statistics Canada, the Town of Black Diamond had a population of 2,730 living in 1,178 of its 1,233 total private dwellings, a change of 0.9% from its 2016 population of 2,705. With a land area of 6.82 km^{2} (2.63 sq mi), it had a population density of 400.3/km^{2} (1,036.8/sq mi) in 2021.

In the 2016 Census of Population conducted by Statistics Canada, the Town of Black Diamond recorded a population of 2,700 living in 1,098 of its 1,108 total private dwellings, a 13.8% change from its 2011 population of 2,373. With a land area of 3.84 km^{2} (1.48 sq mi), it had a population density of 703.1/km^{2} (1,821.1/sq mi) in 2016.

== Government ==
Black Diamond was governed by a town council of seven including a mayor and six councillors. The final mayor of the Town of Black Diamond was Brendan Kelly.

Since January 1, 2023, the area of Black Diamond is governed by the Diamond Valley Town Council.

== Gallery ==
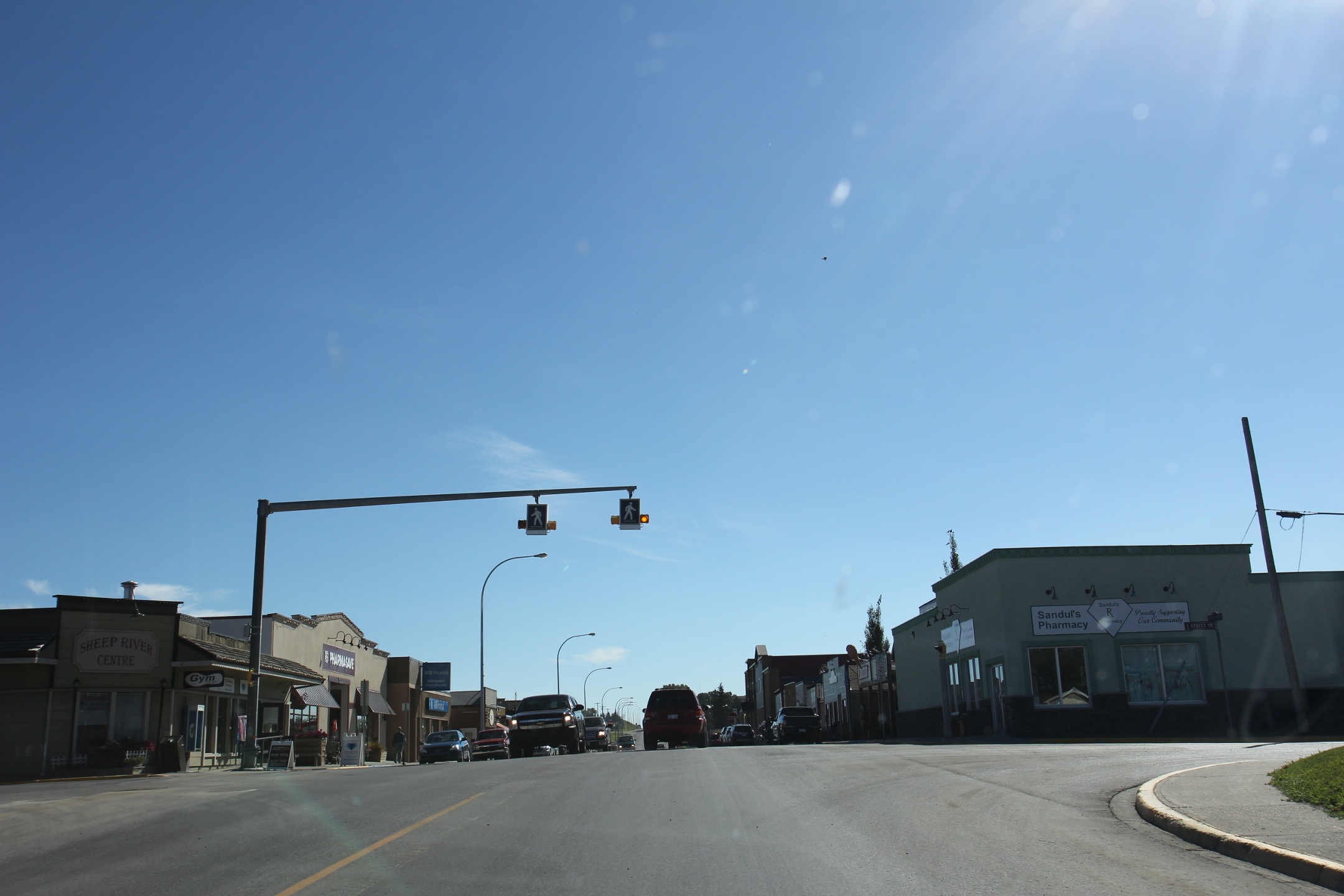
Looking south in Black Diamond

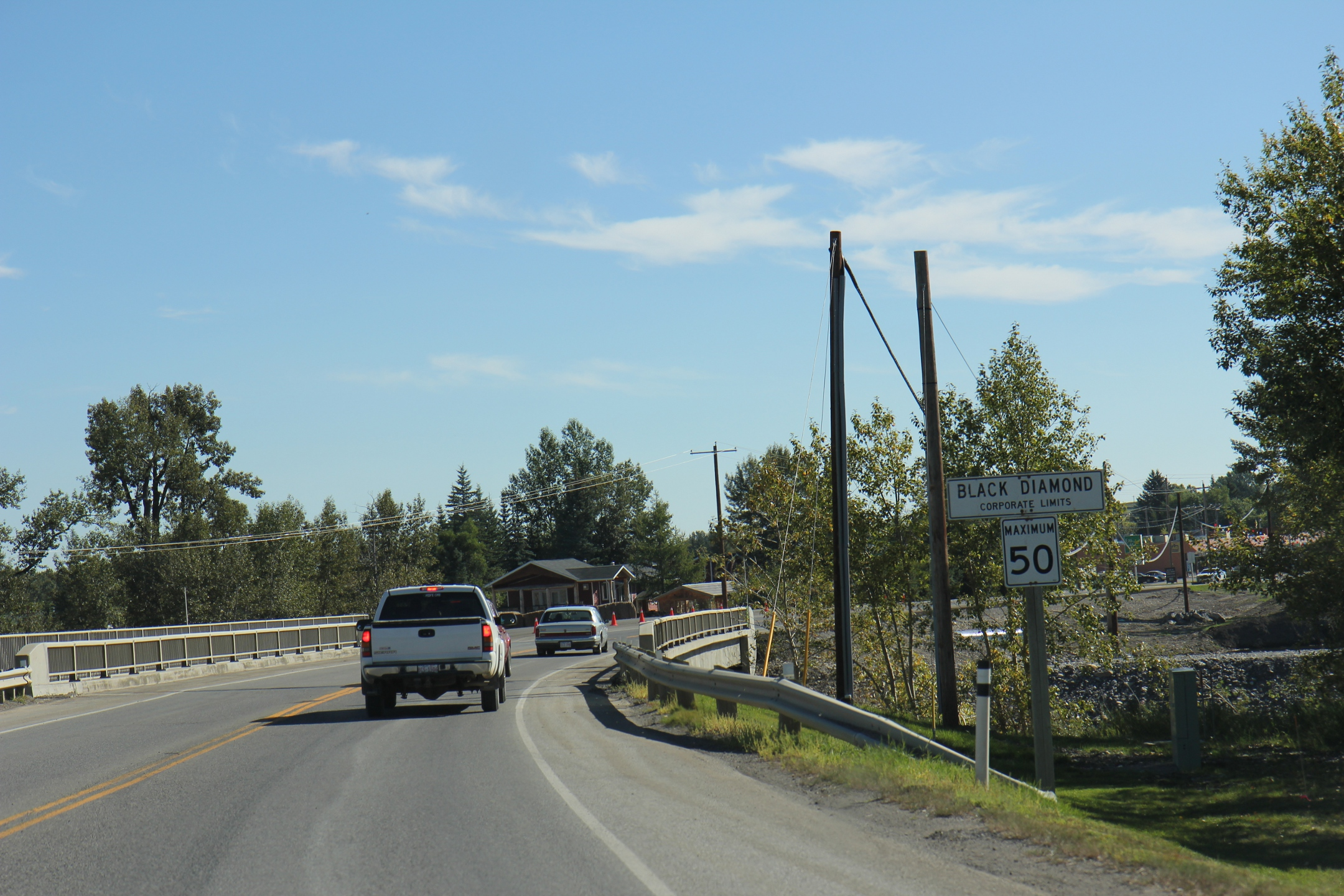
Sign looking east on Alberta Highway 22

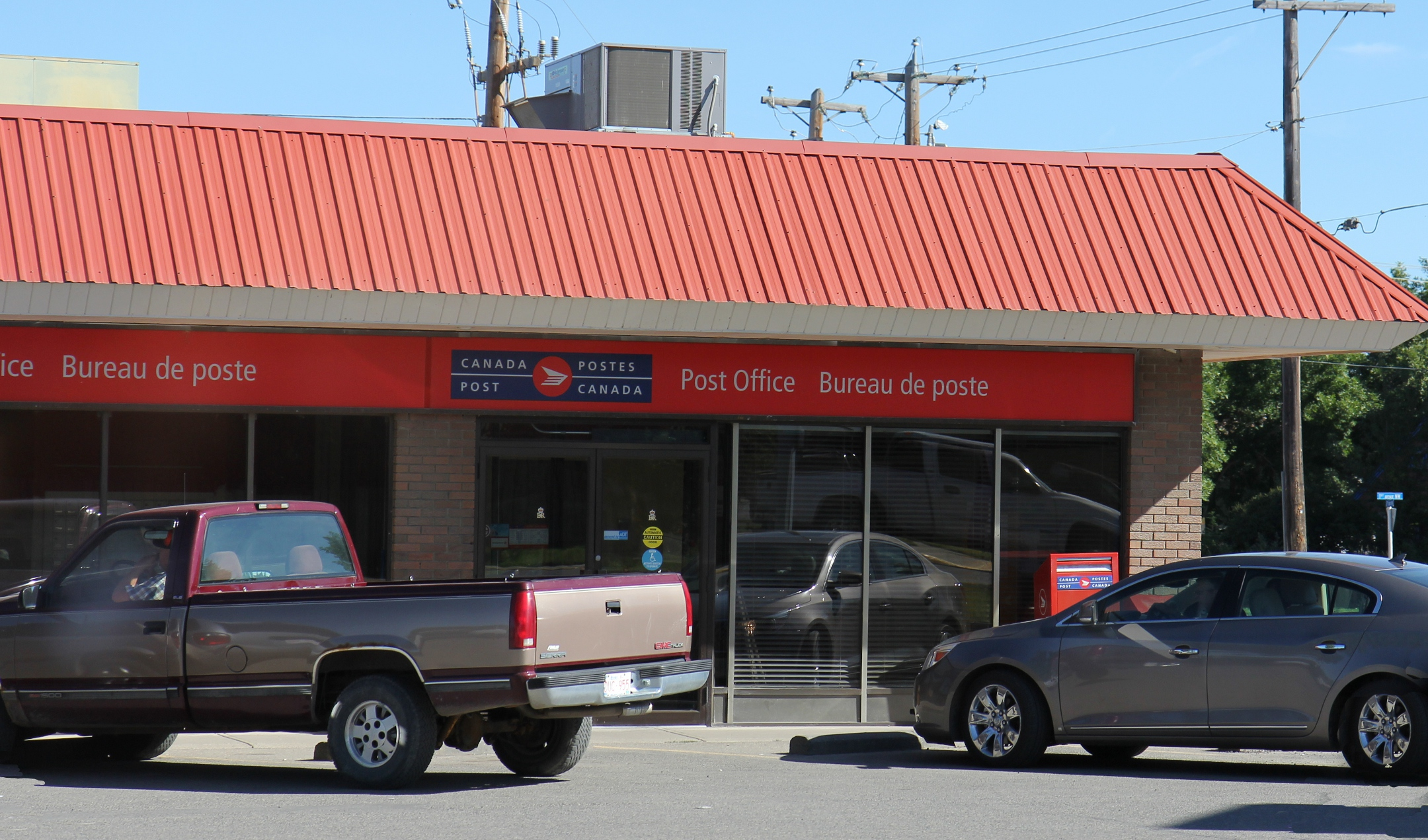
Post office

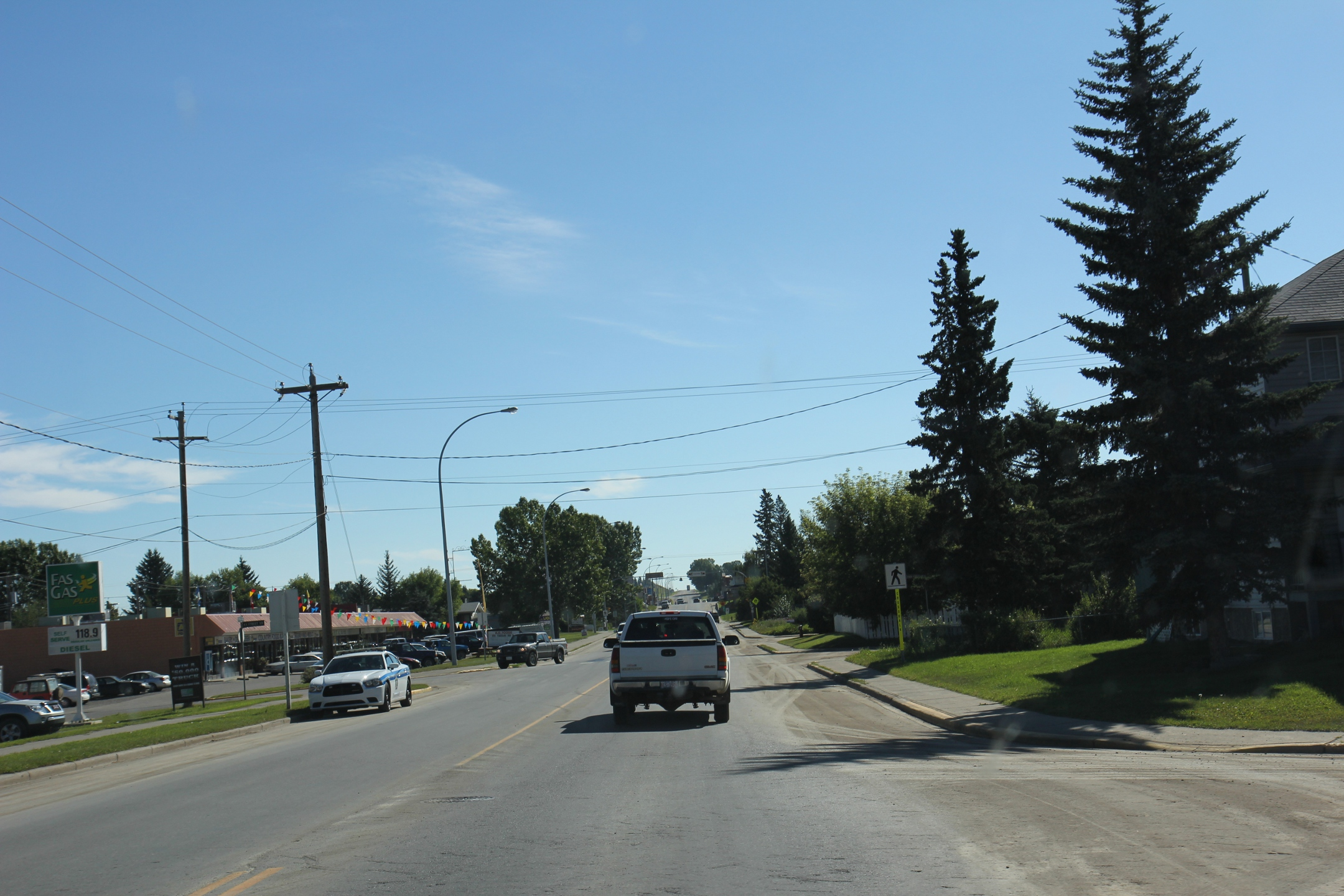
Looking east at Black Diamond

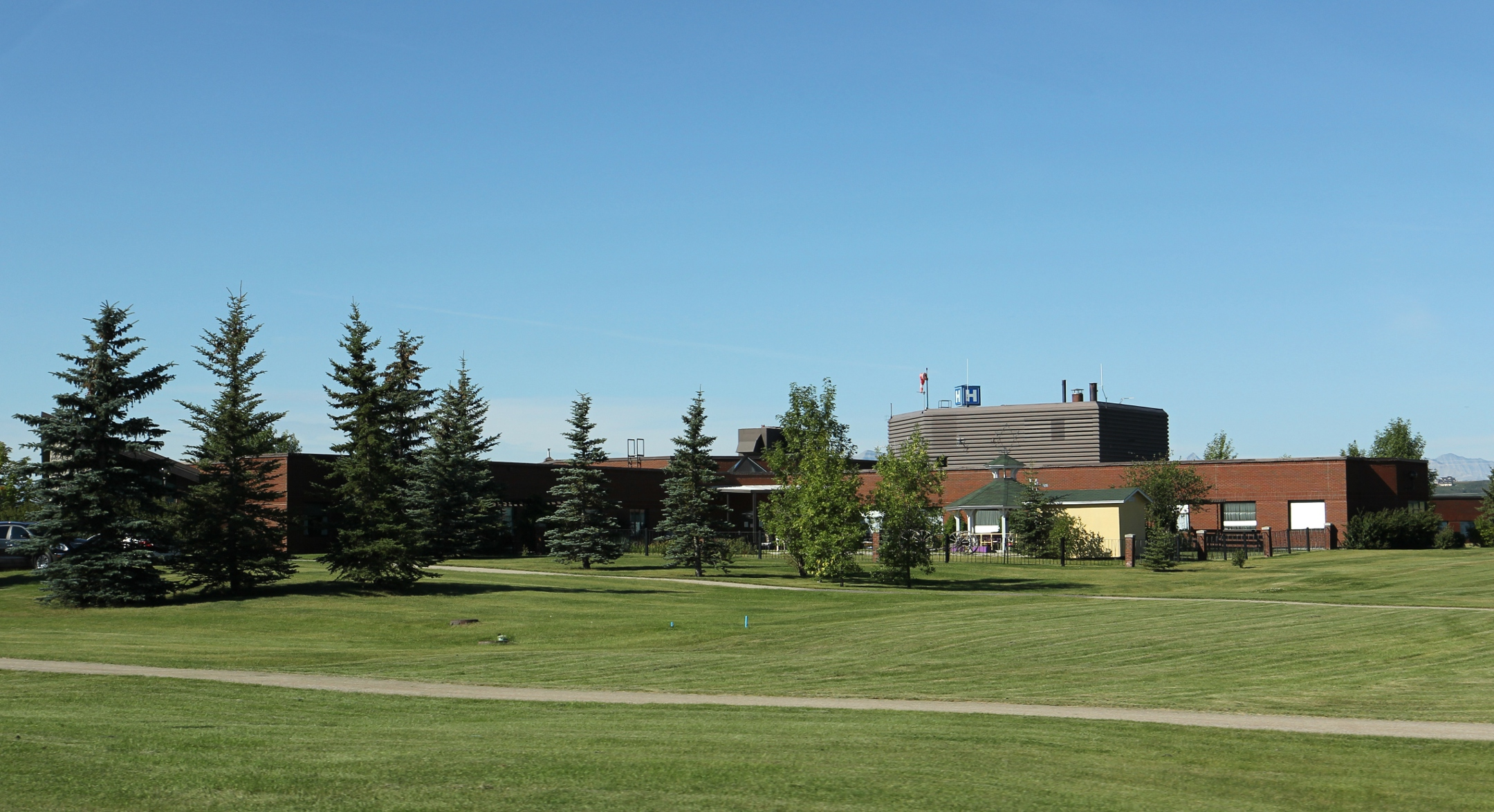
Oilfields General Hospital

== See also ==
- Black Diamond (Oilfields General Hospital) Heliport
- Black Diamond/Cu Nim Airport
- Black Diamond/Flying R Ranch Aerodrome
- List of communities in Alberta
- List of former urban municipalities in Alberta
