= Ferintosh, Alberta =

Ferintosh
- Hamlet
- Hamlet of Ferintosh
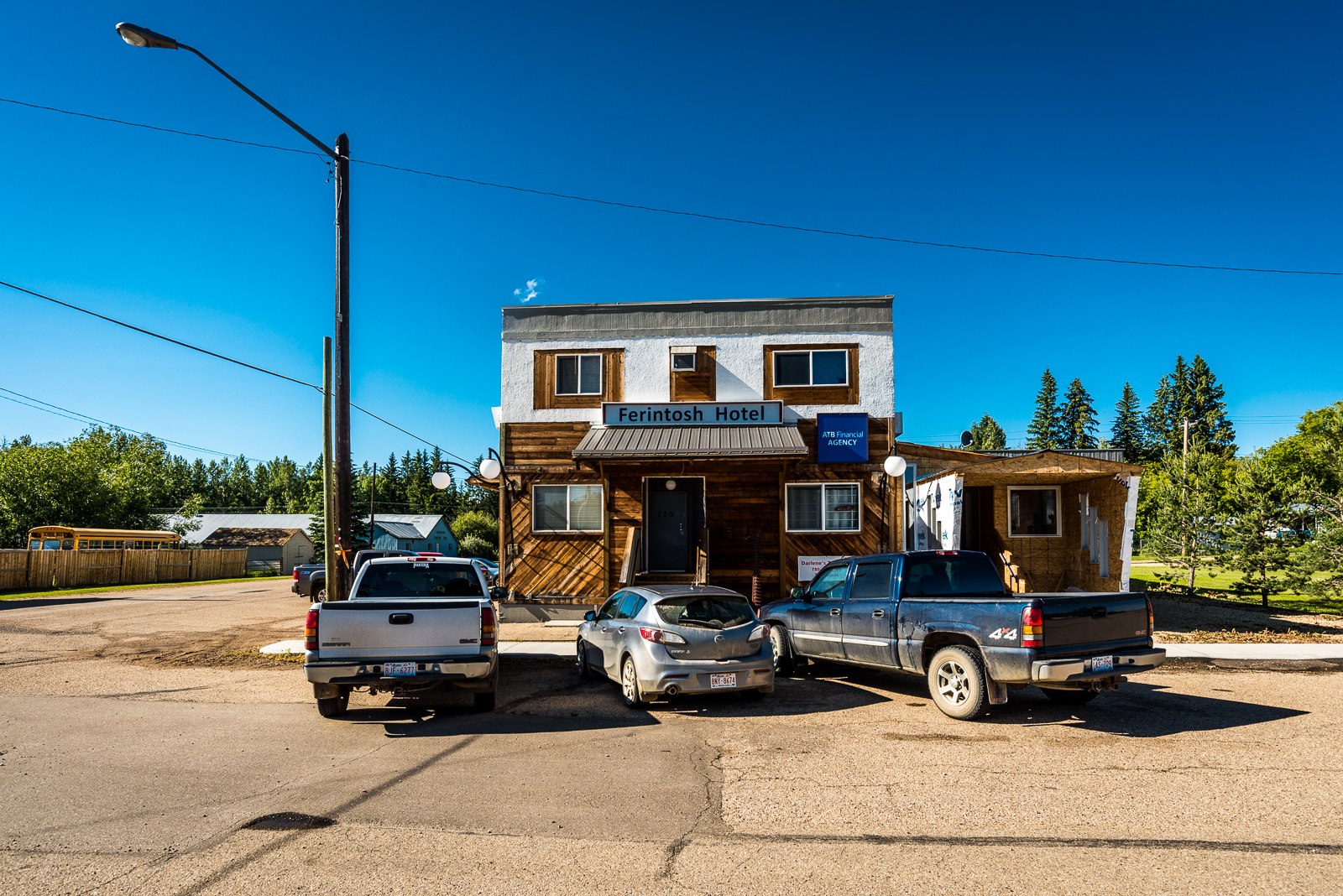
- Ferintosh Hotel

- Location in Alberta
- Coordinates: 52°45′56″N 112°58′9″W
- Country: Canada
- Province: Alberta
- Region: Central Alberta
- Census division: 10
- Municipal district: Camrose County
- Incorporated
  - Village: January 9, 1911
- Dissolved: January 1, 2020

Government
  - Mayor: Marvin Jassman
  - Governing body: Ferintosh Village Council

Area (2021)
  - Land: 0.64 km^{2} (0.25 sq mi)
- Elevation: 760 m (2,490 ft)

Population (2021)
  - Total: 180
  - Density: 282.6/km^{2} (732/sq mi)
- Time zone: UTC−06:00 (Alberta Time)
- Highways: Highway 21; Highway 609
- Website: Official website

Ferintosh is a hamlet in central Alberta, Canada within Camrose County. It is located approximately 38 kilometres (24 mi) south of Camrose, and 102 kilometres (63 mi) southeast of Edmonton. The hamlet is situated on Little Beaver Lake. The community takes its name from Ferintosh, in Scotland.

== History ==
Ferintosh incorporated as a village on January 9, 1911. It relinquished its village status on January 1, 2020, when it dissolved to become a hamlet under the jurisdiction of Camrose County.

== Geography ==
Nearby communities include:

- New Norway
- Edberg
- Bashaw
- Meeting Creek

== Demographics ==
In the 2021 Census of Population conducted by Statistics Canada, Ferintosh had a population of 180 living in 90 of its 105 total private dwellings, a change of −10.9% from its 2016 population of 202. With a land area of 0.64 km^{2} (0.25 sq mi), it had a population density of 281.3/km^{2} (728.4/sq mi) in 2021.

As a designated place in the 2016 Census of Population conducted by Statistics Canada, Ferintosh had a population of 202 living in 97 of its 103 total private dwellings, a change of 11.6% from its 2011 population of 181. With a land area of 0.66 km^{2} (0.25 sq mi), it had a population density of 306.1/km^{2} (792.7/sq mi) in 2016.

== See also ==
- List of communities in Alberta
- List of former urban municipalities in Alberta
- List of hamlets in Alberta
