= Alberta Highway 595 =

Highway in Alberta, Canada

Highway 595
- Delburne Road

Route information
- Maintained by City of Red Deer & Alberta Transportation
- Length: 38 km (24 mi)

Major junctions
- West end: Highway 2 / Highway 2A in Red Deer
- East end: Highway 21 near Delburne

Location
- Country: Canada
- Province: Alberta
- Specialized and rural municipalities: Red Deer County
- Major cities: Red Deer

Highway system
- Alberta Numbered Highway Network; List; Former
← Highway 594	→ Highway 597

Alberta Provincial Highway No. 595, also known as Highway 595, is a short highway in the province of Alberta, Canada. It runs west–east from Gaetz Avenue (Highway 2A) along 19 Street, along the southern edge of the Red Deer River valley, to Highway 21 approximately five kilometres (3 mi) north of the village of Delburne. It is also known as Delburne Road and "The Coal Trail" deriving from the route being used to access the Coal mines near Delburne from Red Deer in the early 1900s and is about 38 kilometres (24 mi) long.

Prior to the completion of Highway 11 in the early 1990s, Highway 595 was Red Deer's main eastern approach. Highway 595 used to extended 5.7 kilometres (3.5 mi) east of its current eastern terminus at Range Road 231, but when Highway 21 was realigned to bypass Delburne in the 1980s, the section became part of Highway 21.

== Major intersections ==
Starting from the west end of Highway 595:

Location	km	mi	Destinations	Notes
Red Deer	−0.5	−0.31	To Highway 2 north – Edmonton Taylor Drive (Highway 2A south)	Highway 2 exit 395
Red Deer	0.0	0.0	Gaetz Avenue (Highway 2A north); To Highway 2 south – Calgary	Western terminus; Highway 2 exit 394
Red Deer County	14.7	9.1	Highway 808 north	
Red Deer County	21.1	13.1	Highway 816 south – Pine Lake	
Red Deer County	38.2	23.7	Highway 21 south – Delburne, Three Hills	Eastern terminus; continues as Highway 21 north; proposed Highway 921 north (ROW to proposed Red Deer River crossing)
Red Deer County	43.9	27.3	Highway 21 north / Range Road 231 – Bashaw	Former eastern terminus
1.000 mi = 1.609 km; 1.000 km = 0.621 mi: Closed/former
