= Alberta Highway 21 =

Highway in Alberta

Highway 21

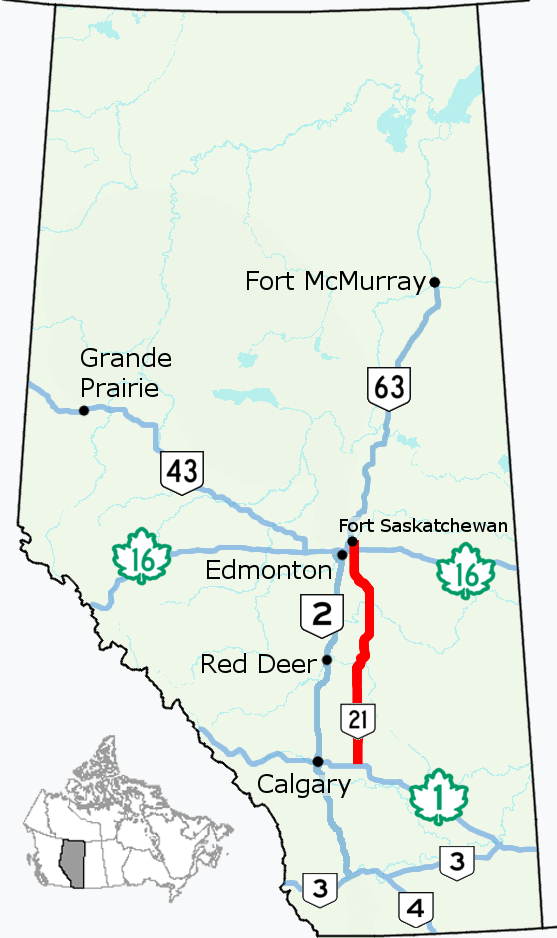
- Highway 21 highlighted in red

Route information
- Maintained by Alberta Transportation
- Length: 328 km (204 mi)

Major junctions
- South end: Highway 1 (TCH) east of Strathmore
- Highway 9 near Beiseker; Highway 27 near Three Hills; Highway 42 near Lousana; Highway 11 near Alix; Highway 12 near Alix; Highway 50 in Mirror; Highway 53 in Bashaw; Highway 13 near Camrose; Highway 14 near Sherwood Park; Highway 16 (TCH) near Sherwood Park
- North end: Highway 15 in Fort Saskatchewan

Location
- Country: Canada
- Province: Alberta
- Specialized and rural municipalities: Wheatland County, Kneehill County, Red Deer County, Stettler No. 6 County, Lacombe County, Camrose County, Leduc County, Strathcona County
- Major cities: Camrose, Sherwood Park, Fort Saskatchewan
- Towns: Three Hills, Trochu, Bashaw
- Villages: Delburne, Ferintosh, Hay Lakes

Highway system
- Alberta Numbered Highway Network; List; Former
← Highway 20	→ Highway 22

Highway 21 is a north–south highway in Alberta, Canada that parallels Highway 2 between Calgary and Edmonton. It is approximately 328 kilometres (204 mi) in length. It begins at the Trans-Canada Highway (Highway 1) east of Strathmore, and ends at Fort Saskatchewan where it is succeeded by Highway 15. The northernmost 25 kilometres (16 mi) of the highway are twinned. Highway 21 runs roughly parallel to the main north–south CN rail line between Calgary and Edmonton between Three Hills and Looma.

== Route description ==
Highway 21 begins at Highway 1 approximately 10 kilometres (6 mi) east of Strathmore in Wheatland County and travels north, passing near the village of Rockyford (located about 8 km (5 mi) east of Highway 21) and it reaches a four-way stop at Highway 9 between Beiseker and Drumheller, where it crosses into Kneehill County. It continues north past the village Carbon (located about 6 km (4 mi) east of Highway 21) to the intersection of Highway 27 east / Highway 582 west, beginning 16-kilometre (10 mi) concurrency with Highway 27. Highway 21 continues to the town of Three Hills, home of Prairie Bible Institute, passing along the town's eastern edge. North of Three Hills, the CN rail line begins to run parallel to the highway, serving most of the communities along the route. Highway 27 departs from Highway 21 towards Olds, about 3 kilometres (2 mi) south of the town Trochu. Highway 21 passes the hamlet of Huxley and the access road to Dry Island Buffalo Jump Provincial Park before entering Red Deer County; the Kneehill / Red Deer county boundary also signifies the transition from the prairie to aspen parkland ecosystem, with increasing foliage. Highway 21 bypasses Elnora and Lousana prior to Delburne, skirting its western edge on a bypass constructed in the 1980s. North of Delburne, Highway 21 reaches a T intersection with Highway 595 and turns east for 5.7 kilometres (3.5 mi) along Township Road 380, then north at Range Road 231, the former alignment through Delburne. The roadway narrows for the following 23 kilometres (14 mi) as it heads towards the Red Deer River, which it crosses at the Content Bridge. North of the Red Deer River, it briefly enters Stettler County, crossing Highway 11 and Highway 12.

Highway 21 turns west and follows Highway 12 for 1 mile (1.6 km) entering Lacombe County, before turning north, about 6 kilometres (4 mi) east of the village of Alix. It passes by the hamlet of Mirror before entering Camrose County, passing northwest of Buffalo Lake. The route bypasses Bashaw, concurrent with Highway 53 7 kilometres (4 mi), then continues north past Ferintosh and the hamlets of New Norway and Duhamel, crossing the Battle River at an area locally known as Ross' Flats. Highway 21 intersects Highway 13 at the locality of Ervick, about 6 kilometres (4 mi) west of the city of Camrose, home of the Augustana Faculty of the University of Alberta (formerly Augustana University College) and Big Valley Jamboree; Highway 21 is considered the main north–south highway serving Camrose despite not entering city limits. It continues north past the hamlet of Armena and village of Hay Lakes, entering Leduc County just south of the hamlet of New Sarepta, into the eastern portion of the Edmonton Metropolitan Region. North of the hamlet Looma, it enters Strathcona County and reaches an interchange with Highway 14. It becomes a divided highway, passing along the eastern edge of Sherwood Park prior to an interchange at Highway 16. Highway 21 continues north to the city of Fort Saskatchewan in which it ends at Highway 15.

== History ==
The southern terminus of Highway 21 was originally at Highway 9 in the village of Beiseker, travelled north for 13 kilometres (8 mi) along present-day Highway 806 to the village of Acme, travelled east for approximately 20 kilometres (12 mi) along present-day Highway 575, before turning north towards Three Hills. In c. 1958, Highway 21 was realigned to travel due south from Three Hills to Highway 9, and was later extended to Highway 1 near Strathmore, while the former section was renumbered to Highway 21A until c. 1962, when it was renumbered to Highway 26, and again renumbered in c. 1972 to its present designations.

The section from Fort Saskatchewan to Highway 16 was originally designated as Highway 55. By 1960, Highway 21 terminated at Highway 14 southwest of Edmonton. In the 1970s, Highway 21 was extended north from Highway 14 past Sherwood Park to Highway 16, while Highway 55 was renumbered and became part of Highway 21. The section of Highway 21 previously designated as 55 was twinned in the 1980s, and the section adjacent to Sherwood Park was completed in late 2009.

== Future ==
Alberta Transportation has long-term plans to replace the Content Bridge across the Red Deer River with a new crossing north of Delburne. Right-of-way is protected from the Highway 595 intersection to Highway 11 southwest of Alix, as well as from the current Highway 21 north / Highway 12 intersection south to Highway 11 – internally designated as Highway 921. There is no timeline on construction.

Alberta Transportation, in partnership with the City of Edmonton, City of Fort Saskatchewan, Strathcona County, and Sturgeon County, is also studying a new North Saskatchewan River crossing in northeast Edmonton that would include a new roadway from the Highway 15 / Highway 28A intersection to Highway 21 south of Fort Saskatchewan. The study is still in the early stages, but proposals show that Highway 21 might be realigned so that through traffic would flow from Highway 16 to the new bridge and tie into Highway 28A. The final alignment has not been determined and it is not yet known if it would be designated as part of Highway 21. The proposed bridge and its connecting roads will not be constructed for another 25 to 35 years. There are also long-term plans to upgrade Highway 21 to expressway/freeway standards from the northeast river crossing to Highway 625 as part of a High Load/Heavy Haul bypass connecting Nisku to northeastern Alberta and Fort McMurray.

== Major intersections ==
Starting from the south end of Highway 21:

Rural/specialized municipality	Location	km	mi	Destinations	Notes
Wheatland County		0.0	0.0	Highway 1 (TCH) – Medicine Hat, Strathmore, Calgary	
Wheatland County		13.0	8.1	Highway 564 west – Nightingale	South end of Highway 564 concurrency
Wheatland County		16.3	10.1	Highway 564 east	North end of Highway 564 concurrency
Wheatland County		21.2	13.2	UAR 133 east – Rockyford	
Wheatland County		31.5	19.6	Crosses the Rosebud River	
↑ / ↓		39.3	24.4	Highway 9 – Calgary, Drumheller	
Kneehill County		53.2	33.1	Highway 575 – Acme, Carbon	
Kneehill County		59.2	36.8	UAR 187 west – Swalwell	
Kneehill County		69.0	42.9	Highway 27 east – Morrin, Hanna; Highway 582 west – Didsbury	South end of Highway 27 concurrency
Kneehill County	Three Hills	75.4	46.9	Highway 583 (2nd Street N)	
Kneehill County		85.1	52.9	Highway 27 west – Torrington, Olds	North end of Highway 27 concurrency
Kneehill County	Trochu	88.4	54.9	Highway 585 east – Rumsey	
Kneehill County		98.1	61.0	Highway 587 west – Bowden	
Kneehill County	Huxley	99.5	61.8	UAR 71 east	
Kneehill County		101.4	63.0	PAR 133 east – Dry Island Buffalo Jump Provincial Park	
Red Deer County		107.8	67.0	UAR 89 east – Elnora	
Red Deer County		111.0	69.0	Highway 590 – Innisfail, Big Valley	
Red Deer County		120.8	75.1	Highway 42 west – Pine Lake, Penhold; UAR 90 east – Lousana	
Red Deer County	Delburne	130.7	81.2	UAR 221 east (20 Street)	
Red Deer County		133.9	83.2	Highway 595 west – Red Deer	Unsigned Highway 921 north; south end of ROW to proposed Red Deer River crossing
↑ / ↓		154.2	95.8	Crosses the Red Deer River	
County of Stettler No. 6		155.6	96.7	Highway 11 – Red Deer, Stettler	Former Highway 21A east
County of Stettler No. 6		161.2	100.2	Highway 12 east – Stettler	South end of Highway 12 concurrency
Lacombe County		162.8	101.2	Highway 12 west – Alix, Lacombe	North end of Highway 12 concurrency; unsigned Highway 921 south; north end of ROW to proposed Red Deer River crossing
Lacombe County		166.8	103.6	Highway 601 – Alix, Buffalo Lake	
Lacombe County	Mirror	173.3	107.7	Highway 50 west (49 Avenue) – Lacombe	
Camrose County	Bashaw	190.3	118.2	Highway 53 east – Forestburg; Highway 605 west	South end of Highway 53 concurrency
Camrose County	Bashaw	191.1	118.7	UAR 206 east (50 Avenue)	
Camrose County		197.3	122.6	Highway 53 west – Ponoka	North end of Highway 53 concurrency
Camrose County	Ferintosh	212.0	131.7	Township Road 441	
Camrose County		213.8	132.8	Highway 609 east – Edberg	
Camrose County		217.3	135.0	Highway 611 west – Maskwacis	
Camrose County	New Norway	223.8	139.1	Township Road 452	
Camrose County		232.6	144.5	Crosses the Battle River	
Camrose County	Ervick	240.2	149.3	Highway 13 – Wetaskiwin, Camrose	Roundabout
Camrose County	Armena	251.8	156.5	Range Road 211	
Camrose County		253.6	157.6	Highway 616 west – Millet	
Camrose County	Hay Lakes	262.7	163.2	Highway 617 east – Kingman	
Leduc County		274.8	170.8	Highway 623 – Rolly View, Leduc, Miquelon Lake Provincial Park	
Leduc County	New Sarepta	275.6	171.2	UAR 172 north	
Leduc County	New Sarepta	279.2	173.5	UAR 172 south	
Leduc County		283.7	176.3	Airport Road – Edmonton International Airport	
Leduc County		287.4	178.6	Highway 625 west – Beaumont, Nisku	
Strathcona County		299.5	186.1	Highway 14 – Edmonton, Wainwright	Interchange
Strathcona County		303.5	188.6	Highway 628 west – Edmonton	To Whitemud Drive
Strathcona County	Sherwood Park	306.8	190.6	Wye Road (Highway 630 east)	
Strathcona County	Sherwood Park	310.0	192.6	Baseline Road	
Strathcona County	Bremner	313.3	194.7	Highway 16 (TCH/YH) – Edmonton, Lloydminster	Interchange; Highway 16 exit 406; to Yellowhead Trail
City of Fort Saskatchewan		328.1	203.9	Highway 15 to Highway 37 – Edmonton, Onoway, Bruderheim, Mundare	Through traffic follows Highway 15 east; to Manning Drive
1.000 mi = 1.609 km; 1.000 km = 0.621 mi: Concurrency terminus
