= Alberta Highway 921 =

Highway in Alberta, Canada

Route information
- Length: 16 km (9.9 mi)
- Status: Proposed

Major junctions
- South end: Highway 21 / Highway 595 north of Delburne
- Highway 11
- North end: Highway 12 / Highway 21 southeast of Alix

Location
- Country: Canada
- Province: Alberta
- Specialized and rural municipalities: Red Deer County, Lacombe County

Highway system
- Alberta Numbered Highway Network; List; Former
← Highway 901	→ Highway 947

Highway 921 is a designated future north-south highway in central Alberta, Canada. Consisting of two future segments, the highway will be approximately 16 km (9.9 mi) in length, not including a future 12 km (7.5 mi) concurrency along Highway 11 (David Thompson Highway), once constructed.

== Route description ==
In the south, future Highway 921 will begin at the intersection of Highway 21 and Highway 595 north of the Village of Delburne within Red Deer County. Traveling north, the first segment of Highway 921 will cross the Red Deer River into Lacombe County before ending at Highway 11.

The second segment of future Highway 921 begins from Highway 11, approximately 12 km (7.5 mi) east of the terminus of the first segment. Traveling north, the second segment will end a short distance later at the intersection of Highway 12 and Highway 21.

== Major intersections ==
The following is a list of the future major intersections along Highway 921 from south to north.

Rural/specialized municipality	Location	km	mi	Destinations	Notes
Red Deer County				Highway 21 south – Delburne, Three Hills	Continues south
Red Deer County				Highway 21 north – Red Deer River (Content Bridge), Stettler; Highway 595 west – Red Deer	
↑ / ↓				Crosses the Red Deer River	
Lacombe County				Highway 11 – Red Deer	Future Hwy 921 branches east; west end of Hwy 11 concurrency
Lacombe County				Highway 601 north – Alix	
Lacombe County				Highway 11 east – Stettler	Future Hwy 921 branches north; east end of Hwy 11 concurrency
Lacombe County				Highway 12 – Lacombe, Stettler; Highway 21 south – Red Deer River (Content Bridge)	
Lacombe County				Highway 21 north – Mirror, Bashaw, Camrose	Continues north
1.000 mi = 1.609 km; 1.000 km = 0.621 mi: Concurrency terminus; Unopened
