= Alberta Highway 42 =

Highway in Alberta, Canada

Highway 42

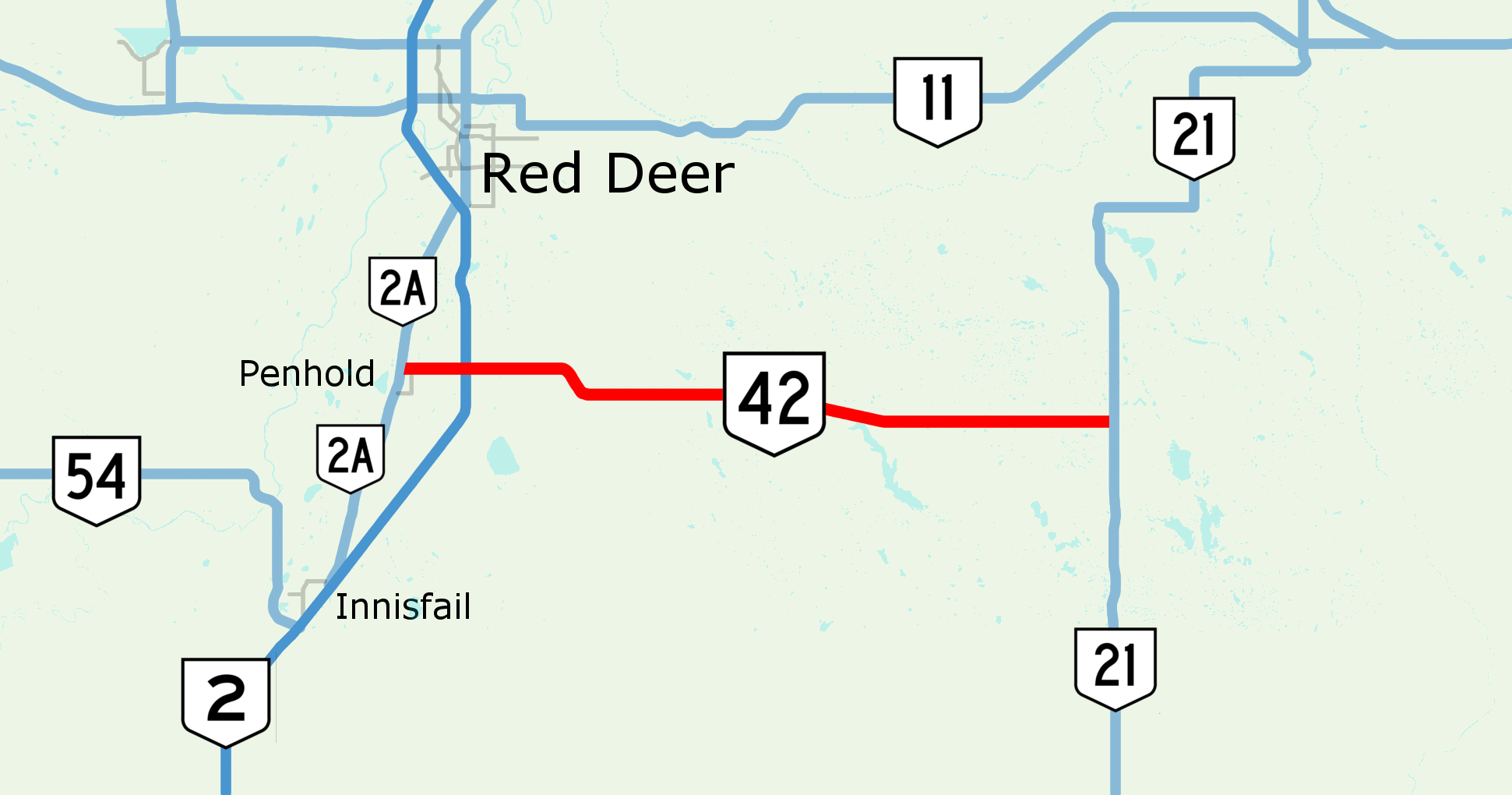
- Highway 42 highlighted in red

Route information
- Maintained by the Ministry of Transportation and Economic Corridors
- Length: 44.02 km (27.35 mi)

Major junctions
- West end: Highway 2A / Highway 592 in Penhold
- Highway 2 near Penhold
- East end: Highway 21 near Lousana

Location
- Country: Canada
- Province: Alberta
- Specialized and rural municipalities: Red Deer County
- Towns: Penhold

Highway system
- Alberta Provincial Highway Network; List; Former
← Highway 41	→ Highway 43

Alberta Provincial Highway No. 42, commonly referred to as Highway 42, is a 44-kilometre (27 mi) highway in central Alberta, Canada that connects Highway 2A in Penhold, about 9 kilometres (6 mi) south of the city of Red Deer, to Highway 21 near the Hamlet of Lousana.

== Major intersections ==
From west to east.

Rural/specialized municipality	Location	km	mi	Destinations	Notes
Penhold		0.0	0.0	Highway 592 west Highway 2A – Red Deer, Innisfail	Access to Red Deer Regional Airport; Highway 42 western terminus; continues as Highway 592
Red Deer County		4.0	2.5	Highway 2 – Edmonton, Red Deer, Calgary	Interchange; Highway 2 exit 384
Red Deer County		25.9	16.1	Highway 816 north	West end of Highway 816 concurrency
Red Deer County	Pine Lake	27.6	17.1	Highway 816 south	East end of Highway 816 concurrency
Red Deer County		44.0	27.3	Highway 21 – Bashaw, Three Hills UAR 90 east – Lousana	Highway 42 eastern terminus; continues as Urban Approach Road 90
1.000 mi = 1.609 km; 1.000 km = 0.621 mi: Concurrency terminus
