= Gâtine =

Gâtine or Gatine may refer to:

- Gatine, Alberta, a locality in Canada
- Gâtinais, in the départments of Loiret and Seine-et-Marne, France
- Gâtine Tourangelle, in the north of the département of Indre-et-Loire
- Gâtine Vendéenne, in the centre of the département of Deux-Sèvres
