= Trochu =

Trochu can refer to:

- Trochu, Alberta
- Louis Jules Trochu, French military leader and politician
