= Dry Island Buffalo Jump Provincial Park =

Provincial park in Alberta, Canada

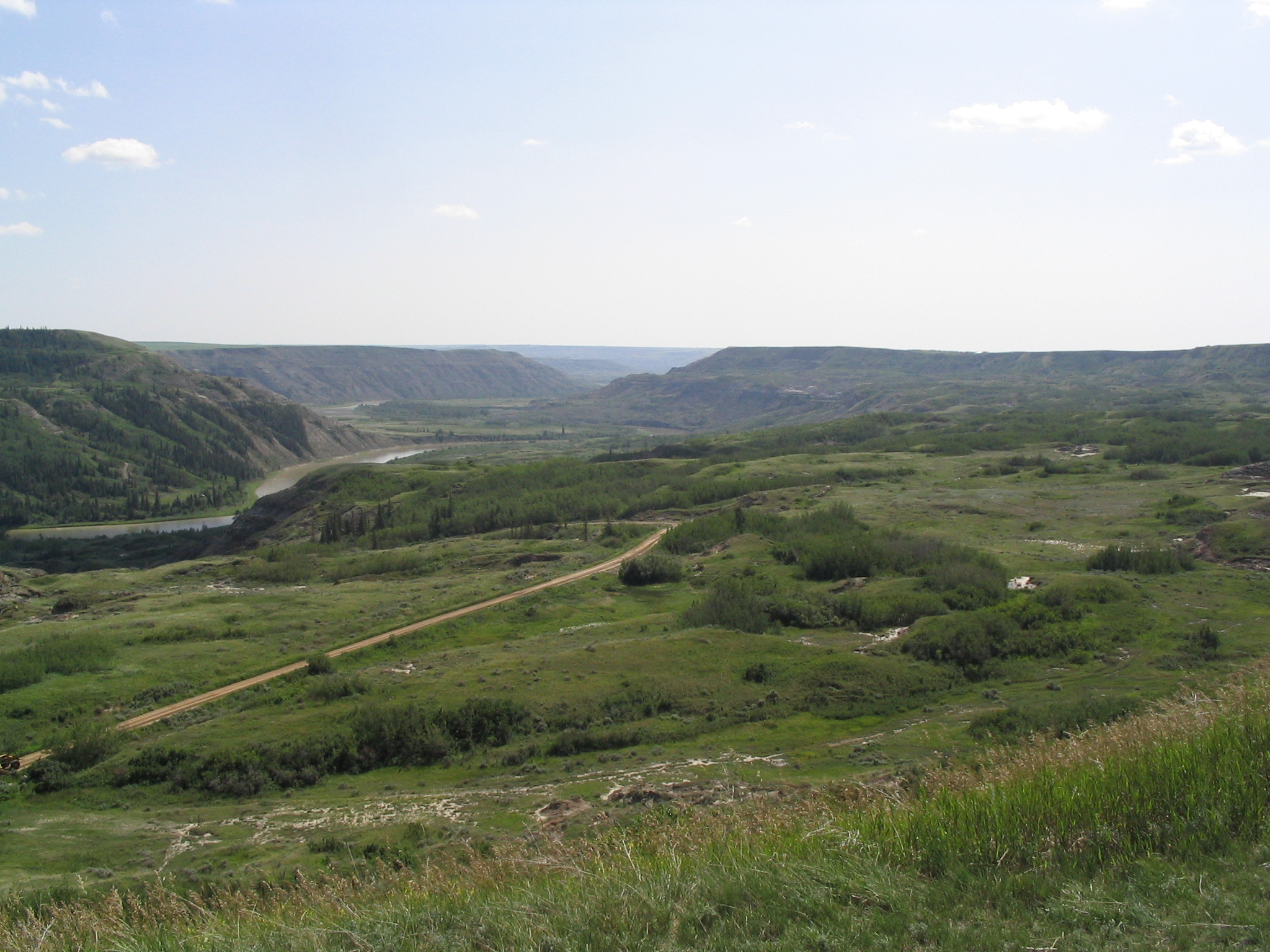
- Panoramic view

- Location within Alberta
- Interactive map of Dry Island Buffalo Jump Provincial Park
- Location: Kneehill County / Alberta, Canada
- Nearest city: Trochu, Red Deer
- Coordinates: 51°56′38″N 112°57′49″W
- Area: 34.5 km^{2} (13.3 sq mi)
- Established: December 15, 1970
- Governing body: Alberta Tourism, Parks and Recreation

Dry Island Buffalo Jump Provincial Park is a provincial park in Central Alberta, Canada, located about 103 km (64 mi) southeast of Red Deer and 16 km (9.9 mi) northeast of Trochu, 1 mile north and 10 miles east of Huxley. The park is situated along the Red Deer River and features badlands topography. Its name derives from the large plateau in the middle of the park, 200 m (660 ft) above the Red Deer River, which has never been developed by humans and retains virgin prairie grasses.

The park is situated at an elevation ranging from 720 m (2,360 ft) to 875 m (2,871 ft) and has an area of 34.5 km^{2} (13.3 sq mi). It is the site of an ancient buffalo jump, where Blackfoot native people drove bison over the cliffs in large numbers to provide for their tribes. The hills also contain unique flora and fauna that are not found this far east of Alberta's Rocky Mountains in as large numbers as at Dry Island.

== Albertosaurus bonebed ==
The park contains the most important Albertosaurus bone bed in the world, which was first discovered by Barnum Brown in 1910 and rediscovered by Phil Currie in 1997. The bone bed excavation was halted at the end of August 2005. Currie left the Royal Tyrrell Museum in October 2005 to become the Canada Research Chair with the Biological Sciences Department at the University of Alberta. Under university auspices, excavation at the bone bed continued in the summers of 2006, 2007 and 2008.

== Activities ==
The following activities are available in the park:

- Birdwatching (with 150 bird species spotted, including turkey vulture, golden eagle, red-tailed hawk, Swainson's hawk, prairie falcon, white pelican, mountain bluebird, belted kingfisher and other warblers, great blue heron, marbled godwit, peregrine falcon and willet)
- Camping (two campgrounds are maintained: Tolman East and Tolman West)
- Canoeing and kayaking
- Fishing (brook trout, brown trout, bull trout, burbot, westslope cutthroat trout, emerald shiner, goldeye, lake chub, lake sturgeon, lake whitefish, longnose dace, longnose sucker, mooneye, mountain sucker, mountain whitefish, northern pike, quillback, rainbow trout, sauger, shorthead redhorse, spoonhead sculpin, Trout-perch, walleye, white sucker, yellow perch)
- Scenic viewing

== Gallery ==
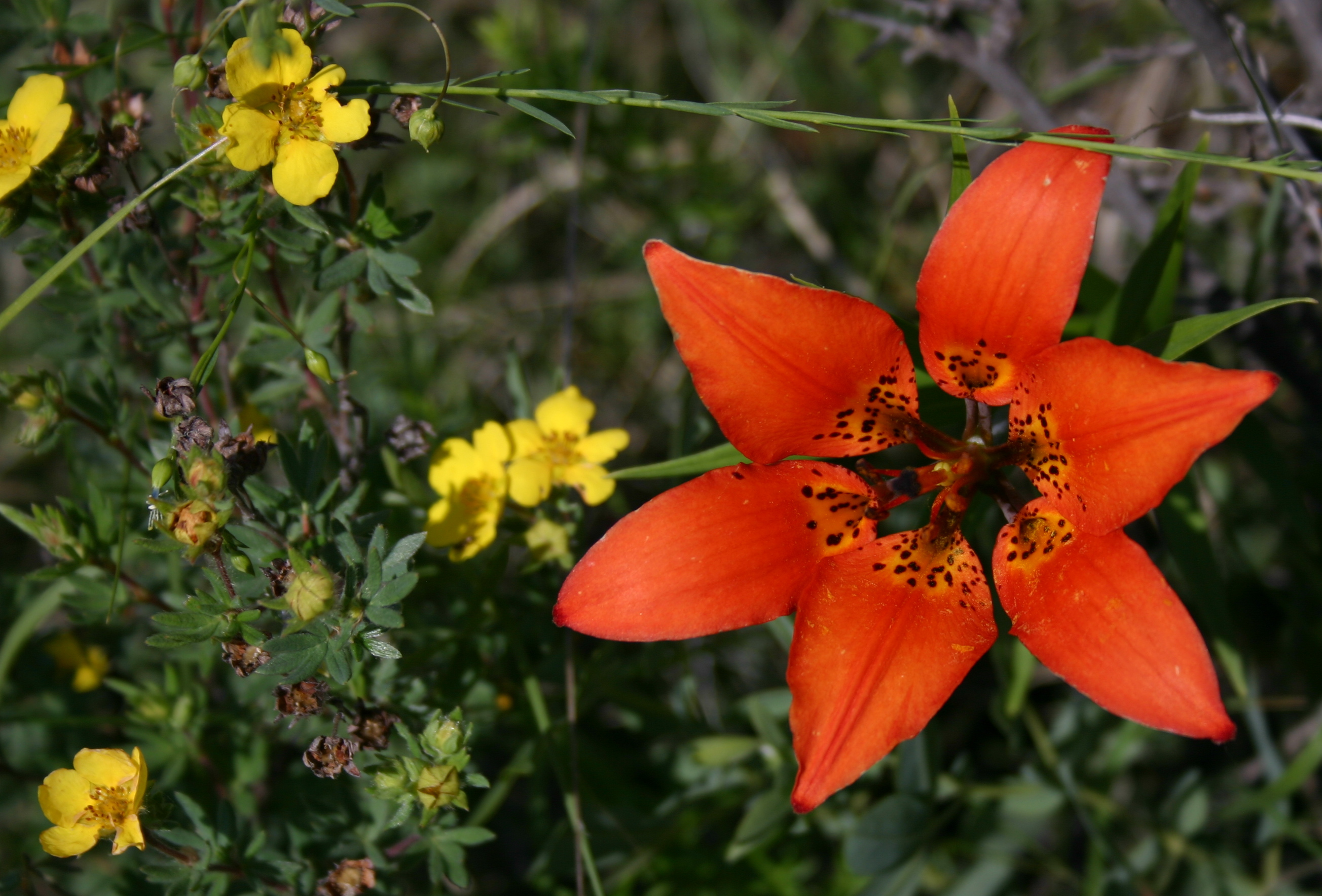
Wildflowers at Dry Island Buffalo Jump

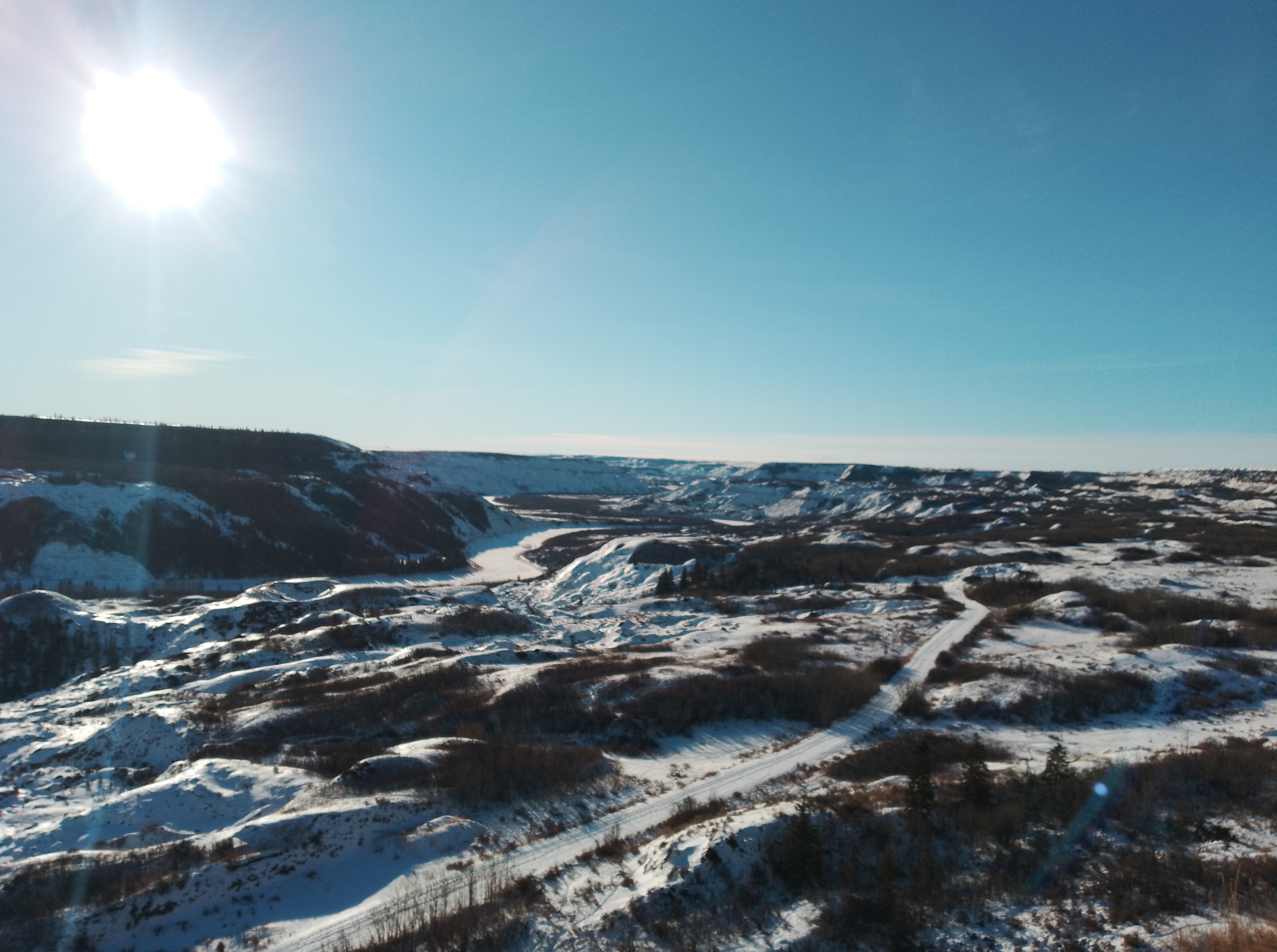
View to southwest in winter, from top of valley

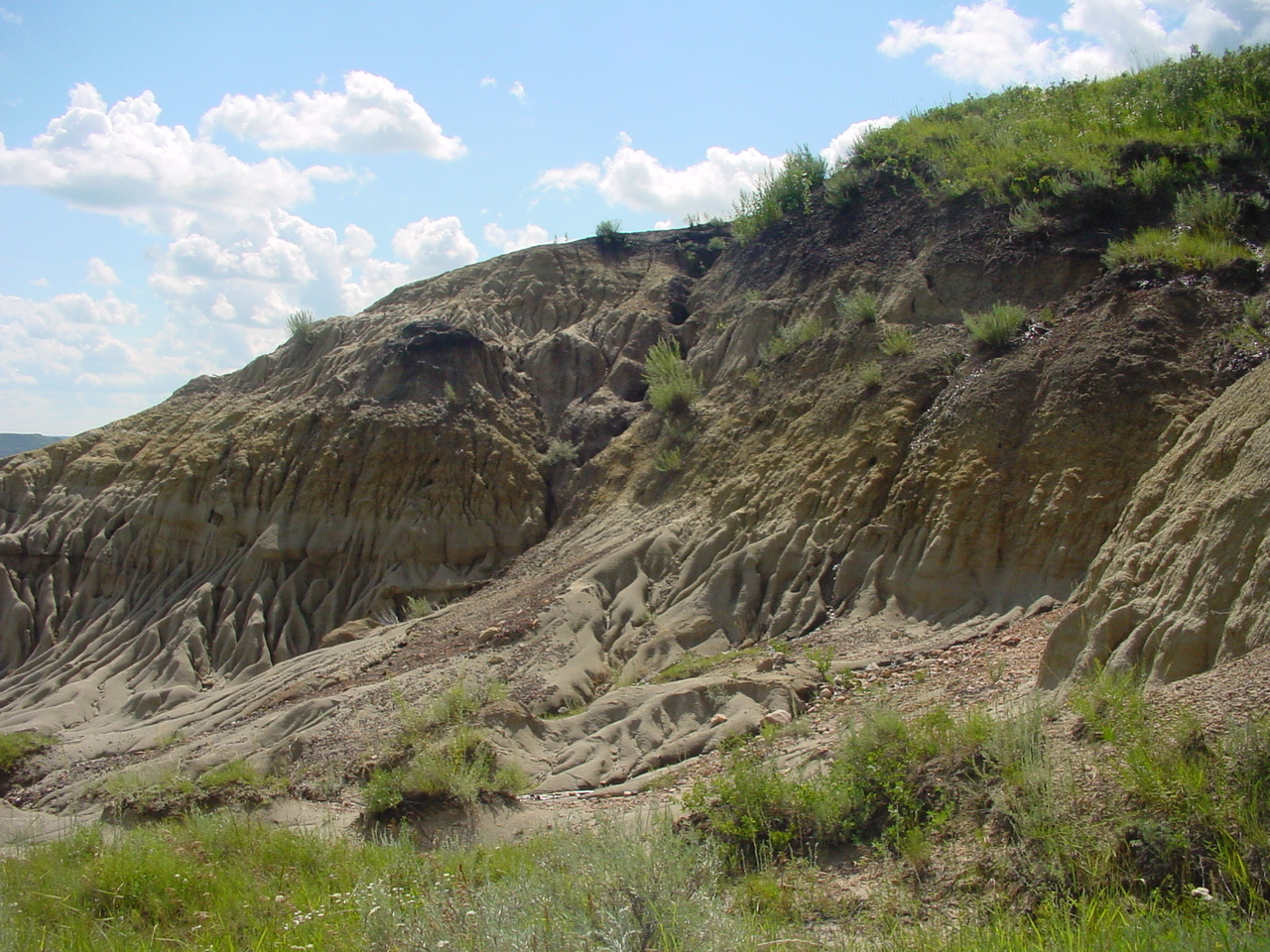
Rills on cliffs, typical of badlands topography

== See also ==
- List of provincial parks in Alberta
- List of Canadian provincial parks
- List of National Parks of Canada
