= Exploration of North America =

European powers employed sailors and geographers to map and explore North America with the goal of economic, religious and military expansion. The combative and rapid nature of this exploration is the result of a series of countering actions by neighboring European nations to ensure no single country had garnered enough wealth and power from the Americas to militarily tip the scales over on the European continent.

== Pre-Columbian exploration ==
According to the Sagas of Icelanders, Norse sailors from Iceland first settled Greenland in the 980s.

L'Anse aux Meadows, an archaeological site on the northernmost tip of Newfoundland, and a second site in southwestern Newfoundland, are the only known sites of a Norse village in North America outside of Greenland. These sites are notable for their possible connections with the attempted colony of Vinland established by Leif Erikson in 1003.

== 15th century ==
The Viking voyages did not become common knowledge in the Old World, and Europeans remained unaware of the existence of the Americas as a whole, until 1492 when Spain discovered the Americas to the rest of the world. Many expeditions were launched from European nations in search of a Northwest Passage to East Asia (or "the Indies" as the region was called) in order to establish a shorter trade route to China than the Silk Road.

On August 3, 1492, the Genoese navigator Christopher Columbus set sail under Spanish flag and with a Spanish crew from the Port of Palos de la Frontera in the Province of Huelva, from the newly los Reyes Católicos coordinated Kingdoms of Castile and Aragon, in present-day Spain, financed by Queen Isabella I of Castille. Columbus's Letter on the First Voyage of his discovery of the Bahamas, Cuba, and Hispaniola spread the news across Europe quickly. Columbus under the Spanish flag rediscovered and explored much of the Lesser Antilles in his second voyage. During his third voyage he discovered both Trinidad and Tobago and reached the mainland on August 5, 1498, skirting the northern South American coast. His fourth voyage was spent scanning the Central American coast. The Spanish voyages of Christopher Columbus opened the New World.

Genoese navigator and explorer Giovanni Caboto (known in English as John Cabot) is credited with the discovery of continental North America on June 24, 1497, under the commission of Henry VII of England. Though the exact location of his discovery remains disputed, the Canadian and United Kingdom governments' official position is that he landed on the island of Newfoundland. The English presence through Giovanni Caboto was signaled in Juan de la Cosa's map of 1500.

In 1499 João Fernandes Lavrador was licensed by the King of Manuel I of Portugal and together with Pero de Barcelos they reached Greenland and sighted Labrador for the first time since Leif Erikson, which was granted and named after Lavrador. After returning he possibly went to Bristol to sail in the name of England. Nearly at the same time, between 1499 and 1502 the brothers Gaspar and Miguel Corte Real explored and named the coasts of Greenland, Labrador and also Newfoundland, naming "Terra Verde" the explored North American coasts. Both explorations were signaled in 1502 Cantino planisphere.

Universalis Cosmographia, the "Waldseemüller map" dated 1507, depicts the Americas, Africa, Europe, Asia, and the Pacific Ocean separating Asia from the Americas.

It was soon understood that Columbus had not reached Asia, but rather found what was to Europeans a New World, which in 1507 was named "America", after Amerigo Vespucci, on the Waldseemüller map.

== 16th century ==
In 1500, Pedro Álvares Cabral was sent by Portugal to explore South America. He is considered to be the discoverer of Brazil.

King Ferdinand II of Aragon sent Juan Ponce de León from the fledgling colony on Hispaniola to verify rumors of undiscovered land to the northwest. On April 2, 1513, Ponce de León disembarked on the northeast coast of what he named Florida for the crown. The exact location is disputed, but historians have offered the possibilities of St. Augustine, Ponce de León Inlet, and Melbourne Beach. He encountered the powerful Gulf Stream, and found a passage through the Florida Keys to land on the southwestern coast of Florida on the Gulf of Mexico. Again, the exact location is disputed. While it is true that Columbus visited Puerto Rico and the Virgin Islands in 1493, Ponce de Leon was the first known European to reach the present-day United States mainland.

On September 25, 1513, Castilian conquistador Vasco Núñez de Balboa was the first European to see the Pacific Ocean once he crossed the Isthmus of Panama. He claimed all the territory touching it for the Crown, later to affect colonization of Las Californias.

In 1517, Spanish explorer Francisco Hernández de Córdoba led the first recorded European expedition to the Yucatán Peninsula. Departing from Cuba with three ships, he and his crew became the first Europeans to encounter the Maya civilization, landing near Cape Catoche and exploring the coasts of Yucatán and Campeche. After suffering heavy attacks from local Maya warriors and severe losses, the expedition returned to Cuba, but Hernández de Córdoba’s accounts prompted further exploration of the Mexican mainland by Juan de Grijalva and later Hernán Cortés.

In 1518, Spanish explorer Juan de Grijalva led an expedition along the Gulf Coast of Mexico, becoming the first European to explore parts of the Mexican mainland. Sailing from Cuba with four ships, he reached the coasts of Tabasco and Veracruz, where his crew made contact and traded with the Maya and Aztec peoples. Grijalva’s reports of rich and organized civilizations inland later inspired Hernán Cortés’s 1519 expedition that led to the conquest of the Aztec Empire.

In 1519, Spanish conquistador Hernán Cortés became the first European to explore the mountainous interior of Mexico and visit Tenochtitlán, the Aztec capital. Setting out from Cuba with a small fleet, he landed near present-day Veracruz and marched inland, forging alliances with Indigenous groups opposed to Aztec rule. After entering Tenochtitlán in November 1519 and capturing Emperor Montezuma II, Cortés and his forces besieged and destroyed the city in 1521, bringing much of central Mexico under Spanish control.

Around 1519–1521, with a mission to establish colonies for Portugal, João Álvares Fagundes explored the coasts of Newfoundland, Labrador, and Nova Scotia.

In 1521, Juan Ponce de León attempted to establish a permanent settlement on the west coast of Florida. The landing place has not been determined. His expedition was repulsed by natives. Ponce de León was struck by an arrow, and died of his wounds.

In 1524, Italian explorer Giovanni da Verrazzano sailed for King Francis I of France, and is known as the first European since the Norse to explore the Atlantic coast of North America. Arriving near the Cape Fear River delta, he explored the coastlines of present-day states of North and South Carolina, entering the Pamlico Sound, and bypassing entrances to the Chesapeake Bay. Believing the New York Harbor to be a lake, he sailed past Long Island, exploring Narragansett Bay and Newfoundland.

In 1524–1525, Portuguese explorer Estevão Gomes, on behalf of Charles I of Spain, explored present-day Nova Scotia sailing south along the Maine coast. Gomes entered New York Harbor and saw the Hudson River (which he named the "San Antonio River"). Because of his expedition, the 1529 Diogo Ribeiro world map outlines the east coast of North America almost perfectly.

In 1528, Pánfilo de Narváez, who had been named adelantado (governor) of La Florida by Carlos I, the King of Spain, landed in Boca Ciega Bay on the west coast of Florida to begin the ill-fated land expedition of 300 men, of which only four survived. One survivor, Álvar Núñez Cabeza de Vaca, wrote the Relación, his book of the eight-year survival journey, on his return to Spain.

In 1534, Jacques Cartier planted a cross in the Gaspé Peninsula on the Gulf of Saint Lawrence and claimed the land in the name of Francis I. In 1535 Cartier explored the St. Lawrence River and also claimed the region for France.

In 1539 Hernando De Soto leads the first European expedition deep into the territory of the modern-day United States (through Florida, Georgia, Alabama, Mississippi, and most likely Arkansas)

== 17th century ==
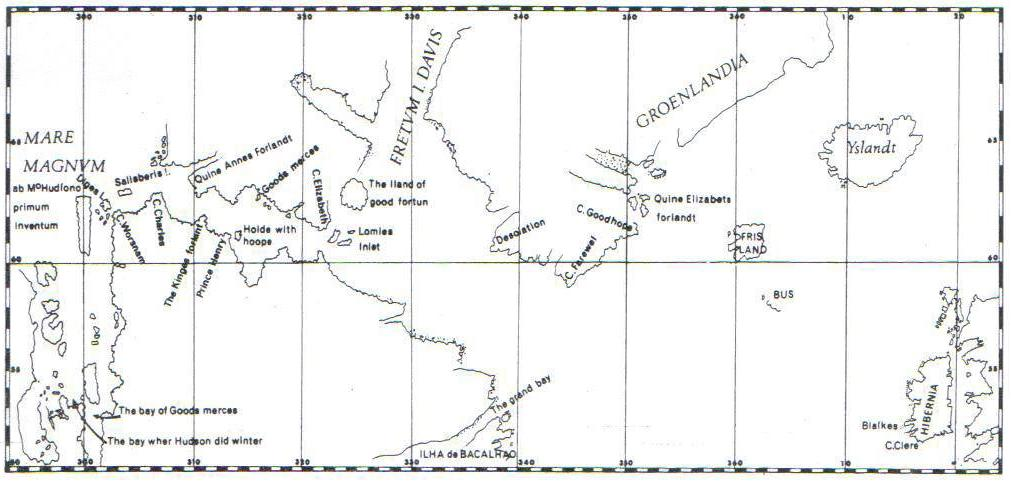
Map of Hudson's voyages to North America.

After two failed attempts to reach East Asia by circumnavigating Siberia, Henry Hudson sailed west in 1609 under the Dutch East India Company. He, too, passed Cape Cod, Chesapeake Bay and the Delaware Bay, instead sailing up the Hudson River on September 11, 1609 in search of a fabled connection to the Pacific via what was actually the Great Lakes. In Hudson's fourth and final voyage, he discovered, mapped, and explored the Hudson Strait, Hudson Bay and James Bay.

Other major sea-based explorers were Captain James Cook, George Vancouver, and Charles Wilkes.

There were numerous Spanish explorers and conquistadors who explored the Southwest of North America (including present-day west and central United States) and crossed the continent (east to west) in its southern regions, mainly from the second quarter to the middle of the 16th century, such as Álvar Núñez Cabeza de Vaca and Francisco Vázquez de Coronado, but also the North American Southeast and south-central regions. While Spain's Juan Rodríguez Cabrillo laid claim to the Pacific Coast of California in the mid 1500s, the earliest land expedition by the Portolà expedition two hundred years later established Catholic missions from Spanish-controlled Baja California northward.

In 1608 Samuel de Champlain founded what is now Quebec City, which would become the first permanent settlement and the capital of New France. He took personal administration over the city and its affairs, and sent out expeditions to explore the interior. Champlain himself discovered Lake Champlain in 1609. By 1615, he had travelled by canoe up the Ottawa River through Lake Nipissing and Georgian Bay to the centre of Wendat country near Lake Simcoe. During these voyages, Champlain aided the Wendat (aka 'Hurons') in their battles against the Haudenosaunee Confederacy. As a result, the Haudenosaunee would become enemies of the French and be involved in multiple conflicts.

From 1679 to 1682 René-Robert Cavelier, Sieur de La Salle explored the Great Lakes region of the United States and Canada, and the entire course of Mississippi River to the Gulf of Mexico.

From 1697 to 1702 Eusebio Kino explored the Sonoran Desert and on his journey to the Colorado River Delta discovered an overland route to Baja California that was then commonly believed to be an island. In 1683 Kino led the first European overland crossing of Baja California.

European exploration of western Canada was largely motivated by the fur trade and the search for the elusive Northwest Passage. Hudson's Bay Company explorer Henry Kelsey has the distinction of being the first European to see the northern Great Plains in 1690.

== 18th century ==
Anthony Henday was one of the first Europeans to have seen the Rocky Mountains, in 1754, but curiously did not mention it in his journals. From his westernmost geographic position (roughly near the town of Olds, Alberta, halfway between Calgary and Red Deer, Alberta) the Rockies should have been quite conspicuous, but he was likely trying to disguise the disappointing fact that an unknown range of seemingly impassible mountains now stood between the Hudson's Bay Company and the Pacific. Samuel Hearne found the Coppermine River in 1769–71 in his failed search for copper ore deposits. Disillusioned by these shortfalls, the HBC largely quit exploration.

The North West Company, on the other hand, used a business model that required constant expansion into untapped areas. Under the auspices of the NWC, Alexander Mackenzie discovered the Mackenzie River in 1789 and was the first European to reach the North-American Pacific overland, via the Bella Coola River, in 1793. Simon Fraser reached the Pacific in 1808 via the Fraser River.

David Thompson, widely regarded as the greatest land geographer that ever lived, traveled over 90,000 km during his lifetime. In 1797, Thompson was sent south by his employers to survey part of the Canada-U.S. boundary along the water routes from Lake Superior to Lake of the Woods to satisfy unresolved questions of territory arising from the Jay Treaty between Great Britain and the United States. By 1798 Thompson had completed a survey of 6,750 km (4,190 mi) from Grand Portage, through Lake Winnipeg, to the headwaters of the Assiniboine and Mississippi Rivers, as well as two sides of Lake Superior. In 1798, the company sent him to Red Deer Lake (in present-day Alberta) to establish a trading post. The English translation of Lac La Biche-Red Deer Lake-first appeared on the Mackenzie map of 1793. Thompson spent the next few seasons trading based in Fort George (now in Alberta), and during this time led several expeditions into the Rocky Mountains. In 1811/1812 he followed the Columbia River to the Pacific, and in 1814 used his notes and measurements to draft the first European-style map of western Canada, covering 3.9 million square kilometres.

== 19th century ==
The route of the Lewis and Clark Expedition from 1804 to 1806

Lewis and Clark were the first Americans to venture into the newly acquired territory of the Louisiana Purchase, at the order of President Thomas Jefferson. They discovered many new geographical features, Indian tribes, and animal and plant species. John Colter was a member of the expedition who subsequently became a guide for others in the 'Old West,' and did some explorations of his own.

John C. Frémont led many important explorations in the Great Plains, Great Basin, Oregon territory, and Mexican Alta California.

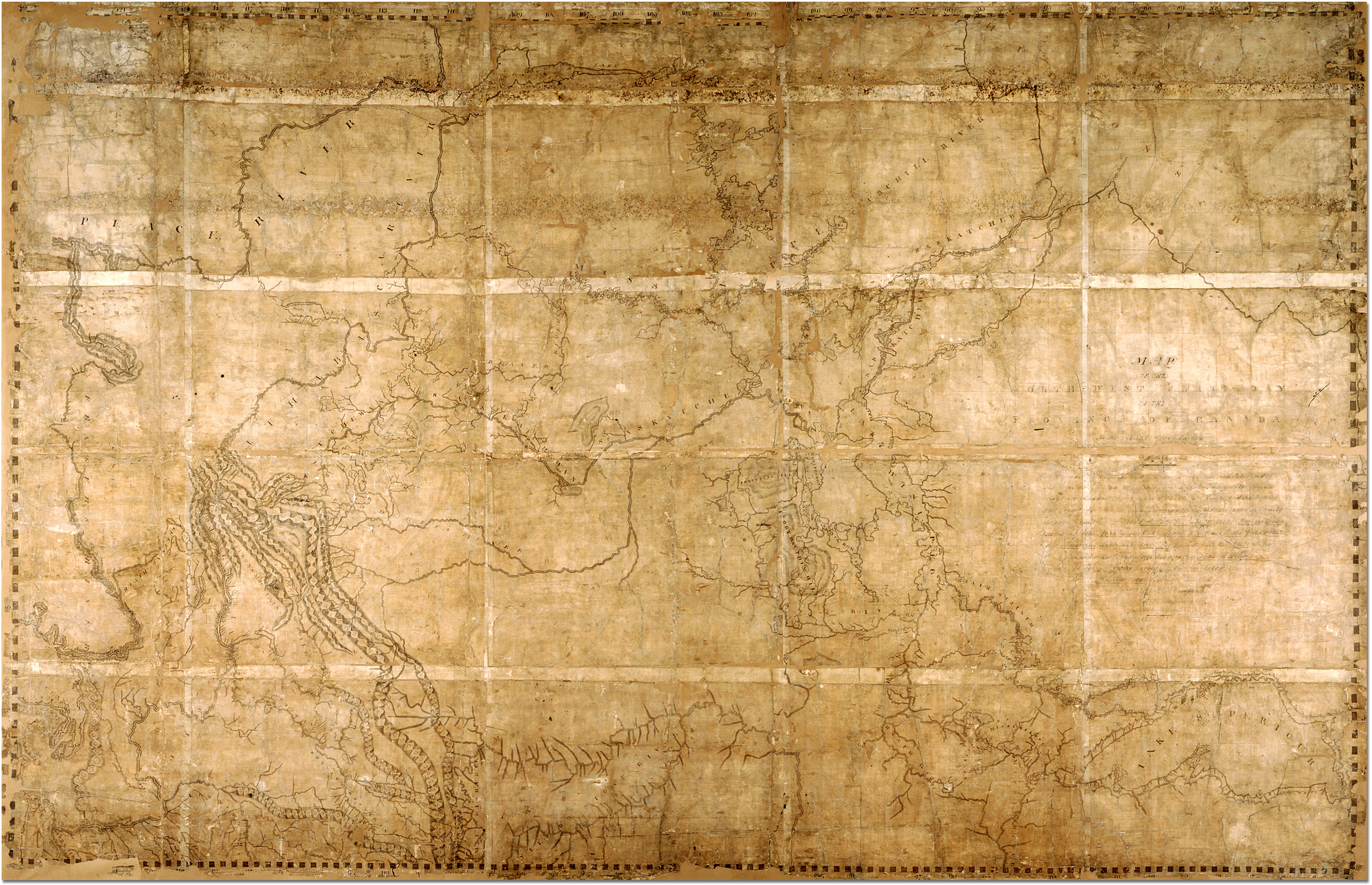
Map of the North-West Territory of the Province of Canada, stretching from the Fraser River on the west to Lake Superior on the east. By David Thompson, 1814.

Joseph Reddeford Walker was one of the most prominent of the explorers, and charted many new paths through the West, which often were then utilized by emigrants crossing to settle in Western towns and communities. In 1833, his exploring party discovered a route along the Humboldt River across present-day Nevada, ascending the Sierra Nevada following the Carson River and descending via Stanislaus River drainages to Monterey. His return route across the southern Sierra was via Walker Pass, named after Walker by John Charles Fremont. The approach of the Sierra via the Carson River route later became known as the California Trail, the primary route for the emigrants to the gold fields during the California gold rush.

As the American population of the West increased, the US government launched ongoing official explorations mainly through the US Army Corps of Topographical Engineers. One of the main officers and explorers in this unit was George Wheeler. In 1872, the US Congress authorized an ambitious plan to map the portion of the United States west of the 100th meridian at a scale of 8 miles to the inch. This plan necessitated what became known as the Wheeler Survey, along with the Clarence King and John Wesley Powell Surveys, and expeditions by Ferdinand Vandeveer Hayden. In 1879, all such efforts were reorganized as the United States Geological Survey.

== See also ==
- Age of Discovery
- Notable cartographers of the Age of Exploration
- European colonization of the Americas
- Voyages of Christopher Columbus
- Old West + Mountain men

== Bibliography ==
- Ambrose, Stephen E.Undaunted Courage: Meriwether Lewis, Thomas Jefferson, and the Opening of the American West, New York: Simon & Schuster (1996).
- Bartlett, Richard. Great Surveys of the American West. Norman: University of Oklahoma Press, 1980.
- Fernlund, Kevin J.William Henry Holmes and the Rediscovery of the American West. Albuquerque: University of New Mexico Press, 2000.
- Goetzmann, William H. Exploration and Empire: The Explorer and the Scientist in the Winning of the American West. New York: Alfred A. Knopf, 1966.
- Maura, Juan Francisco. Españoles y portugueses en Canadá en tiempos de Cristóbal Colón. Colección Parnase-Lemir, Valencia: Universidad de Valencia, 2021. http://parnaseo.uv.es/Lemir/Textos/Juan_Maura_Lemir.pdf
- Pyne, Stephen J. Grove Karl Gilbert: A Great Engine of Research. Austin: University of Texas Press, 1980.
- Stegner, Wallace. Beyond the Hundredth Meridian: John Wesley Powell and the Second Opening of the West. Houghton, Mifflin, 1954.
- Andrews, J.Rr. "Spain's Conquest of America." The Hispanic American Historical Review, vol. 33, no. 4, University of California Press, 1953, pp. 623–637
- Gibson, Charles. "The Aztecs Under Spanish Rule: A History of the Indians of the Valley of Mexico." Stanford University Press, 1964.
- Himmerich y Valencia, Robert. "The Encomenderos of New Spain, 1521–1555." University of Texas Press, 1991.
- Seed, Patricia. "Colonial Spanish America: A Documentary History." Rowman & Littlefield, 1998.
- Restall, Matthew. "Seven Myths of the Spanish Conquest." Oxford University Press, 2003.
- Johnson, Lyman, and Sonya Lipsett-Rivera. "The Faces of Honor: Sex, Shame, and Violence in Colonial Latin America." University of New Mexico Press, 2003.
- Vitoria, Francisco de. "De Indis et de Iure Belli Relectiones." Reprint edition, Lawbook Exchange Ltd, 2006.
- Lockhart, James and Stuart Schwartz. "Early Latin America: A History of Colonial Spanish America and Brazil." Cambridge University Press, 1983.
- Varon Gabai, Rafael. "Other Council Fires Were Here Before Ours: A Classic Native American Creation Story as Retold by a Contemporary Seneca/Oneida Writer." Syracuse University Press, 2013.
- Mignolo, Walter D. "The Darker Side of the Renaissance: Literacy, Territoriality, and Colonization." University of Michigan Press, 1996.
