= Looma, Alberta =

Looma
- Hamlet
- Location of Looma Looma (Canada)
- Coordinates: 53°21′28″N 113°15′03″W
- Country: Canada
- Province: Alberta
- Region: Edmonton Metropolitan Region
- Census division: 11
- Municipal district: Leduc County

Government
  - Type: Unincorporated
  - Governing body: Leduc County Council

Area (2021)
  - Land: 0.46 km^{2} (0.18 sq mi)

Population (2021)
  - Total: 33
  - Density: 71.4/km^{2} (185/sq mi)
- Time zone: UTC−06:00 (Alberta Time)
- Area codes: 780, 587, 825

Looma is a hamlet in central Alberta, Canada within Leduc County. It is located 1 kilometre (0.62 mi) west of Highway 21, approximately 24 kilometres (15 mi) southeast of Edmonton.

== Demographics ==
In the 2021 Census of Population conducted by Statistics Canada, Looma had a population of 33 living in 14 of its 16 total private dwellings, a change of 10% from its 2016 population of 30. With a land area of 0.46 km^{2} (0.18 sq mi), it had a population density of 71.7/km^{2} (185.8/sq mi) in 2021.

As a designated place in the 2016 Census of Population conducted by Statistics Canada, Looma had a population of 30 living in 12 of its 14 total private dwellings, a change of −38.8% from its 2011 population of 49. With a land area of 0.46 km^{2} (0.18 sq mi), it had a population density of 65.2/km^{2} (168.9/sq mi) in 2016.

== See also ==
- List of communities in Alberta
- List of hamlets in Alberta
