= New Norway =

- Hamlet
- Hamlet of New Norway
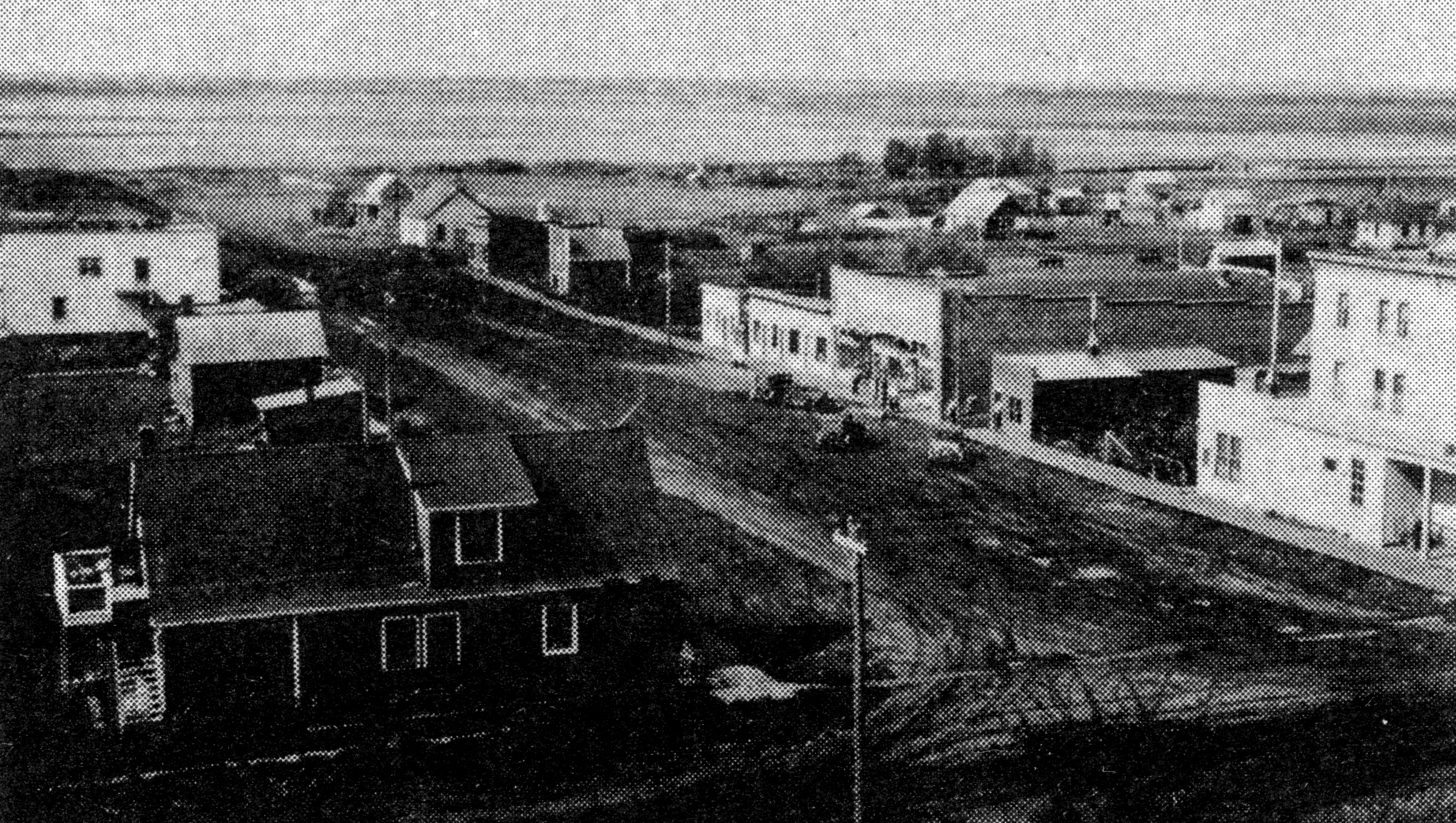
- New Norway circa 1915

- Location within Alberta
- Coordinates: 52°52′09.9″N 112°57′18.1″W
- Country: Canada
- Province: Alberta
- Region: Central Alberta
- Census division: 10
- Municipal district: Camrose County
- Founded: 1895
- Incorporated: 1909
- Dissolved: November 1, 2012

Government
  - MP: Pierre Poilievre
  - MLA: Jackie Lovely

Area (2021)
  - Land: 1.13 km^{2} (0.44 sq mi)
- Elevation: 745 m (2,444 ft)

Population (2021)
  - Total: 307
  - Density: 271.8/km^{2} (704/sq mi)
- Time zone: UTC−06:00 (Alberta Time)
- Postal code span: T0B
- Area code: +1-780

New Norway is a hamlet located in central Alberta, Canada within Camrose County. Named in 1895, it is located on Highway 21, approximately 100 km (62 mi) southeast of Edmonton and 22 km (14 mi) southwest of Camrose.

New Norway is home to a number of small businesses, and has an elementary and secondary school, local fire protection and municipal services provided by Camrose County.

== History ==
In 1892, travelling first on the newly constructed Canadian Pacific Railway (CPR) line, the Ole M. Olstad family disembarked in Wetaskiwin and made their way to the Duhamel settlement, which had been established for some years. The family quickly filed Dominion Lands Act homesteads a few miles south for themselves and several relatives and friends in the United States. In addition, they purchased available CPR land for $3.00 per acre ($7.41/ha).

For a time the area was known as the "Olstead District". However, as other Norwegian families (along with those of other nationalities) settled in the area, the name changed to New Norway around 1895. By 1903 the fledgling community had a school, general store, and a blacksmith shop to its credit.

In the fall of 1909, in anticipation of the new Grand Trunk Pacific rail line being built nearby, the community was moved (by the use of skids and seven oxen) to its present location NW-11-45-21-W4 (see Dominion Land Survey). According to the Camrose Canadian, the townsite of New Norway was put on sale on October 14, 1909, with 14 businesses filing an intent to establish within the first month. Commercial lots sold from $100 to $250, and residential lots were priced from $50 to $150.

New Norway incorporated as a village on May 6, 1910, and its first council was elected on May 9, 1910, with Norman M. Smith, James F. Willows and Evan O. Olstad serving.

Over a century later, the Village of New Norway was dissolved to hamlet status under the jurisdiction of Camrose County effective November 1, 2012.

== Demographics ==
In the 2021 Census of Population conducted by Statistics Canada, New Norway had a population of 307 living in 129 of its 138 total private dwellings, a change of −4.1% from its 2016 population of 320. With a land area of 1.13 km^{2} (0.44 sq mi), it had a population density of 271.7/km^{2} (703.7/sq mi) in 2021.

As a designated place in the 2016 Census of Population conducted by Statistics Canada, New Norway had a population of 320 living in 126 of its 136 total private dwellings, a change of 15.1% from its 2011 population of 278. With a land area of 1.12 km^{2} (0.43 sq mi), it had a population density of 285.7/km^{2} (740.0/sq mi) in 2016.

== See also ==
- List of communities in Alberta
- List of former urban municipalities in Alberta
- List of hamlets in Alberta
