= New Sarepta =

- Hamlet
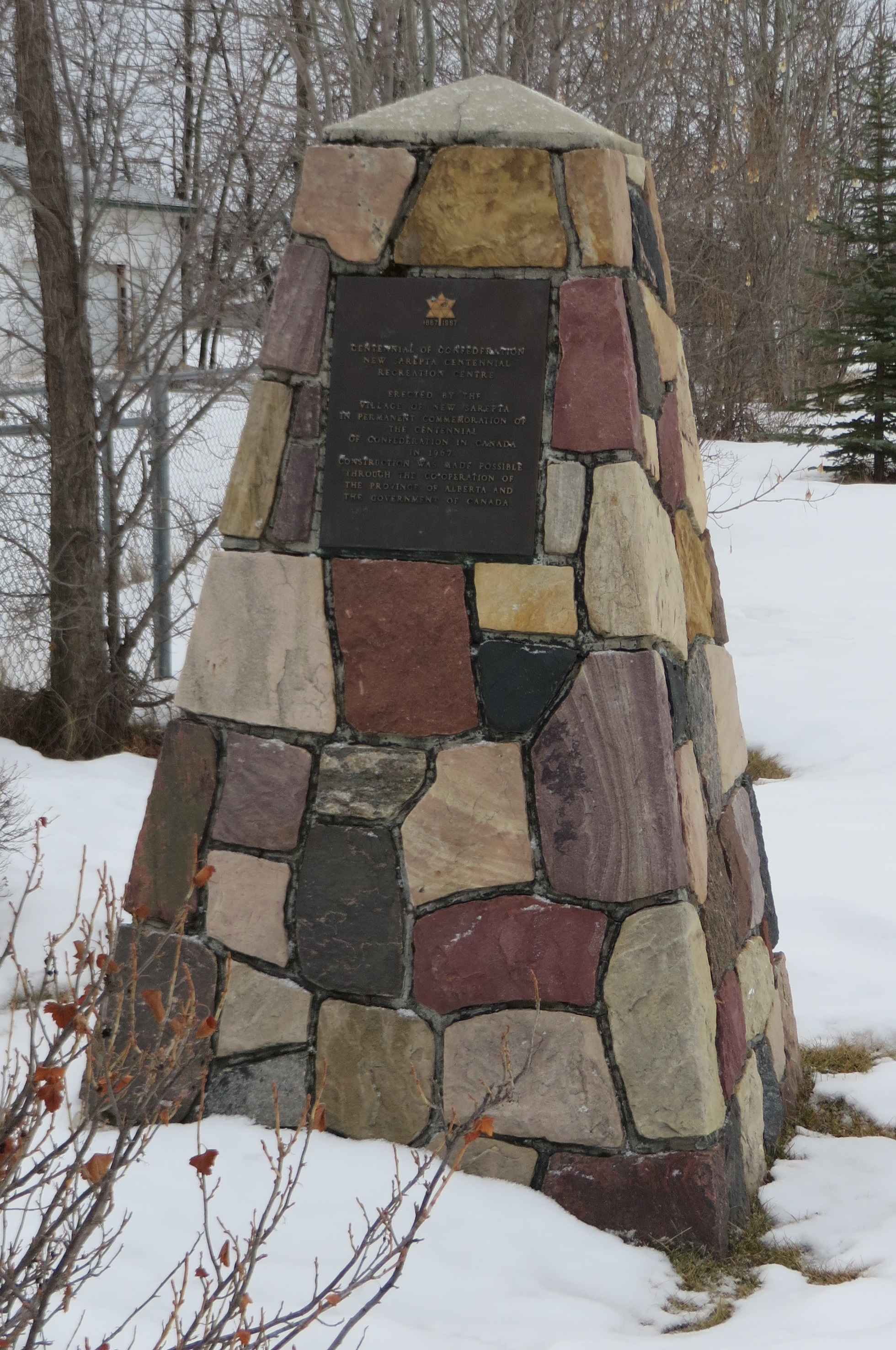
- Cairn marking the Canadian Centennial in New Sarepta
- Motto: The Cartoon Capital of Canada
- Location of New Sarepta in Alberta New Sarepta (Alberta)
- Coordinates: 53°16′20″N 113°08′50″W
- Country: Canada
- Province: Alberta
- Region: Central Alberta
- Census Division: No. 11
- Municipal district: Leduc County
- Founded: 1904
- Incorporated (Village): January 1, 1960
- Dissolved: September 1, 2010

Government
  - Mayor: Tanni Doblanko
  - Governing body: Leduc County Council: Glenn Belozer; Tanni Doblanko; Kelly-Lynn Lewis; Raymond Scobie; Rick Smith; Kelly Vandenberghe; Larry Wanchuk

Area (2021)
  - Land: 2.24 km^{2} (0.86 sq mi)
- Elevation: 770 m (2,530 ft)

Population (2021)
  - Total: 495
  - Density: 221.3/km^{2} (573/sq mi)
- Time zone: UTC−06:00 (Alberta Time)
- Highways: 21
- Waterways: Joseph Lake

New Sarepta is a hamlet in central Alberta, Canada, within Leduc County. It is located approximately 23 km (14 mi) east of the City of Leduc along Highway 21.

New Sarepta dissolved from village status to become a hamlet on September 1, 2010. It originally incorporated as a village on January 1, 1960.

== History ==
=== Name ===
The ancient Phoenician city of Sarepta was located on the Mediterranean coast of today's Lebanon, approximately at the site of the modern village of Sarafand, between Sidon and Tyre.

Sarepta was also mentioned, as Zarephath, in the Old Testament (I Kings 17:9), as the home of Elijah during a drought and famine.

In the 18th century (1765-1773), Moravian Brethren from Germany established the village of Sarepta, Volgograd, Russia. About a century after its founding, the larger German Lutheran Church in Russia began efforts to take Sarepta under its wing. Many of the Moravian Brethren objected, moving elsewhere in Russia, then choosing to emigrate to the Western Hemisphere, including Canada.

Some of these settlers, part of the Germans from Russia diaspora, established a new village in Canada's North-West Territories. From various suggestions, approximately 60 people in the new community signed a document favouring the name Sarepta, honouring their previous village. The government of the North-West Territories designated the name Sarepta to this settlement on October 2, 1904. When the new province of Alberta was split from the North-West Territories in 1905, the government added "New" to distinguish it from the existing place name in Ontario. The Moravian Brethren also felt that it honored and distinguished their newer community from the earlier biblical and Russian villages.

=== Timeline ===
- 1906 New Sarepta School District #1548 was established.
- 1912 Long Prairie Store located in New Sarepta area.
- 1915 Railroad service extended through New Sarepta.
- 1916 First post office opened.
- 1920 Moravian Church was established in area led by Rev. William Scheel.
- 1921 Grain elevator built.
- 1927 New Sarepta village school was organized.
- 1928 First hotel opened.
- 1944 Curling rink was built.
- 1949 Oil boom in Alberta.
- 1960 New Sarepta incorporated as a village.
- 1962 New Sarepta Rural Fire was incorporated.
- 1972 Agriculture building was built.
- 1984 Tire & Girdle Store was built.
- 2010 Government of Alberta dissolved the village into a hamlet within Leduc County on September 1, 2010.

== Demographics ==
In the 2021 Census of Population conducted by Statistics Canada, New Sarepta had a population of 495 living in 194 of its 203 total private dwellings, a change of −5.2% from its 2016 population of 522. With a land area of 2.24 km^{2} (0.86 sq mi), it had a population density of 221.0/km^{2} (572.3/sq mi) in 2021.

As a designated place in the 2016 Census of Population conducted by Statistics Canada, New Sarepta had a population of 522 living in 195 of its 219 total private dwellings, a change of 6.3% from its 2011 population of 491. With a land area of 2.24 km^{2} (0.86 sq mi), it had a population density of 233.0/km^{2} (603.6/sq mi) in 2016.

== Religious assemblies ==
- St. John's Lutheran Church
- The House of Prayer (formerly New Sarepta Country Church)
- Zion Evangelical Missionary Church

== Education ==
New Sarepta has one elementary school and one high school, both operated by Black Gold Regional Schools.

== Recreation ==
Winter

- New Sarepta Minor Hockey Association
- New Sarepta Skating Club [No Club 2006–present]
- Girl Guides
- senior floor curling

Summer

- baseball
- slowpitch
- softball
- running track
- basketball courts
- playgrounds
- Bent Stik Golf Course
- New Sarepta Minor Soccer Association

== See also ==
- List of communities in Alberta
- List of former urban municipalities in Alberta
- List of hamlets in Alberta
