= Wimborne, Alberta =

Wimborne
- Hamlet
- Location of Wimborne Wimborne (Canada)
- Coordinates: 51°51′58″N 113°35′42″W
- Country: Canada
- Province: Alberta
- Region: Southern Alberta
- Census division: 5
- Municipal district: Kneehill County

Government
  - Type: Unincorporated
  - Governing body: Kneehill County Council

Area (2021)
  - Land: 0.16 km^{2} (0.062 sq mi)

Population (2021)
  - Total: 15
  - Density: 91.4/km^{2} (237/sq mi)
- Time zone: UTC−06:00 (Alberta Time)
- Area codes: 403, 587, 825

Wimborne is a hamlet in southern Alberta, Canada within Kneehill County. It is located approximately 58 km (36 mi) southeast of Red Deer. It has an elevation of 975 m (3,199 ft).

The hamlet was probably named for Wimborne Minster in Dorset, England.

== Demographics ==
Population history of Wimborne
Year	Pop.	±%
1941	49	—
1951	90	+83.7%
1956	65	−27.8%
1961	80	+23.1%
1966	57	−28.7%
1971	59	+3.5%
1976	54	−8.5%
1981	68	+25.9%
1986	61	−10.3%
1991	59	−3.3%
1991A	60	+1.7%
1996	46	−23.3%
2001	43	−6.5%
2006	28	−34.9%
2011	31	+10.7%
2016	20	−35.5%
2021	15	−25.0%
Source: Statistics Canada

In the 2021 Census of Population conducted by Statistics Canada, Wimborne had a population of 15 living in 12 of its 14 total private dwellings, a change of −25% from its 2016 population of 20. With a land area of 0.16 km^{2} (0.062 sq mi), it had a population density of 93.8/km^{2} (242.8/sq mi) in 2021.

As a designated place in the 2016 Census of Population conducted by Statistics Canada, Wimborne had a population of 20 living in 14 of its 14 total private dwellings, a change of −35.5% from its 2011 population of 31. With a land area of 0.16 km^{2} (0.062 sq mi), it had a population density of 125.0/km^{2} (323.7/sq mi) in 2016.

== Wimborne Days ==
An annual event that centers around the heritage of community building. Every year, the town and its community gathers to participate in events such as: lawnmower races, miniature golf, fireworks, BBQ and bouncy castle, along with other festivities. This event occurs on July 1 (a.k.a. Canada Day).

== See also ==
- List of communities in Alberta
- List of designated places in Alberta
- List of hamlets in Alberta
