= Red Deer Lake (Alberta) =

Lake in Alberta, Canada

- Location within Alberta
- Location: Ponoka County / Camrose County / County of Wetaskiwin No. 10, Alberta
- Coordinates: 52°42′27″N 113°01′59″W
- Primary outflows: Battle River
- Basin countries: Canada
- Max. length: 15 kilometres (9.3 mi)
- Max. width: 3.4 kilometres (2.1 mi)
- Surface area: 21 square kilometres (8.1 sq mi)
- Surface elevation: 768.6 metres (2,522 ft)

Red Deer Lake is a fresh water alkaline lake situated near Bashaw in central Alberta, Canada.

The 15 kilometres (9.3 mi) long lake is located northwest of the junction of Highway 21 and Highway 53. In descending order of surface area, it straddles the boundaries of Ponoka County, Camrose County, and the County of Wetaskiwin No. 10. The lake is drained through a series of marshes into the Battle River.

The lake has been steadily dropping since 1974 when it was 771.5 m to the 2018 level of 768.6 m, on average 7 cm per year. The cause of the drop is a mystery but losses to groundwater is suspected.

== See also ==
- Lakes in Alberta
