= Sharples, Alberta =

Coordinates: 51°28′42″N 113°3′50″W

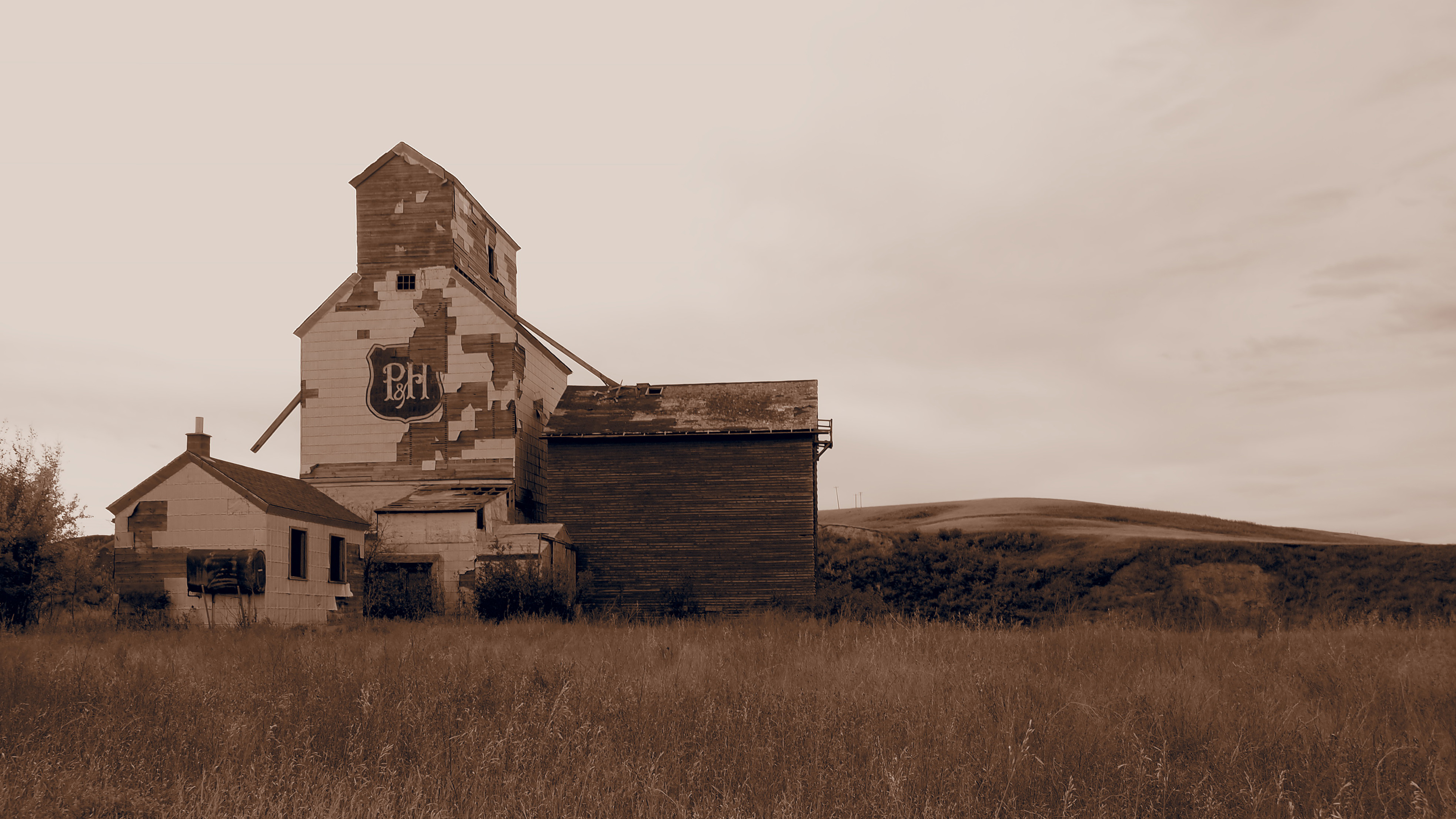
The elevator at Sharples

Sharples is a ghost town in southern Alberta, Canada within the badlands region of Kneehill County. The community is located along the former track bed of the Canadian Pacific Railway, Carbon-Drumheller branch line. It was built in the 1920s when the CPR line was extended through the area.

The community was the site of two grain elevators serving local farmers. At its peak in the 1940s the elevators were handling over 100,000 bushels of wheat per year and a small number of houses surrounded them for those who worked there. The branch line, and with it the grain elevators, were shut in 1982 as the coal industry in the area dwindled making it unprofitable for the CPR. The elevator owned by the Alberta Wheat Pool was demolished, but the Parrish & Heimbecker grain elevator remains standing.

== See also ==
- List of communities in Alberta
