= Lousana =

- Hamlet
- Location of Lousana Lousana (Canada)
- Coordinates: 52°06′46″N 113°11′24″W
- Country: Canada
- Province: Alberta
- Region: Central Alberta
- Census division: 8
- Municipal district: Red Deer County

Government
  - Type: Unincorporated
  - Governing body: Red Deer County Council

Area (2021)
  - Land: 0.09 km^{2} (0.035 sq mi)

Population (2021)
  - Total: 42
  - Density: 486.7/km^{2} (1,261/sq mi)
- Time zone: UTC−06:00 (Alberta Time)
- Area codes: 403, 587, 825

Lousana is a hamlet in central Alberta, Canada within Red Deer County. It is located 4 kilometres (2.5 mi) east of the junction of Highway 21 and Highway 42, approximately 45 kilometres (28 mi) southeast of Red Deer. The hamlet was named by William Henry Biggs, a settler from Louisiana, Missouri, who sold a portion of his land to the Grand Trunk Pacific Railway around 1912 for the townsite. Biggs originally proposed naming the settlement "Louisiana" after his hometown. However, the Post Office Department shortened it to Lousana to avoid confusion with the state of Louisiana.

== Demographics ==
Population history of Lousana
Year	Pop.	±%
1941	72	—
1951	80	+11.1%
1956	94	+17.5%
1961	74	−21.3%
1966	56	−24.3%
1971	46	−17.9%
1976	44	−4.3%
1981	43	−2.3%
1986	44	+2.3%
1991	47	+6.8%
1991A	48	+2.1%
1996	51	+6.2%
2001	55	+7.8%
2006	50	−9.1%
2011	46	−8.0%
2016	58	+26.1%
2021	42	−27.6%
Source: Statistics Canada

In the 2021 Census of Population conducted by Statistics Canada, Lousana had a population of 42 living in 22 of its 30 total private dwellings, a change of −27.6% from its 2016 population of 58. With a land area of 0.09 km^{2} (0.035 sq mi), it had a population density of 466.7/km^{2} (1,208.7/sq mi) in 2021.

As a designated place in the 2016 Census of Population conducted by Statistics Canada, Lousana had a population of 58 living in 23 of its 28 total private dwellings, a change of 26.1% from its 2011 population of 46. With a land area of 0.09 km^{2} (0.035 sq mi), it had a population density of 644.4/km^{2} (1,669.1/sq mi) in 2016.

== See also ==
- List of communities in Alberta
- List of designated places in Alberta
- List of hamlets in Alberta
