= Beynon, Alberta =

Beynon
- Unincorporated community
- Location within Alberta
- Coordinates: 51°20′N 112°47′W
- Country: Canada
- Province: Alberta
- Region: Southern Alberta
- Municipal district: Kneehill County

Beynon is an unincorporated community in central Alberta, Canada.

== General description ==
Beynon is primarily a private 500+ acre ecological preserve. Located within a deeply sculpted portion of the Rosebud River valley, the area is recognized as being regionally significant. Due to its topography, valley setting, and relative rarity in terms of biodiversity, Beynon protected its surrounding area by permanently protecting over 400 acres (1.6 km^{2}) from development. This protection was achieved by way of an outright donation of land by Beynon's founding family, who still own most of the unincorporated area called Beynon. The Nature Conservancy of Canada were the recipients of the 400-acre (1.6 km^{2}) land donation in 1999.

== History ==
In 1892, Hugh Hesketh "Beynon" Biggs (1875–1941) emigrated from India and England to Canada, joining his friends the Ritchie brothers at the Springfield Ranche in the Rosebud River valley. At that time, the Springfield Ranche was little more than a sod roofed log cabin with the bare beginnings of a proper Ranch. Soon after Biggs arrived he began importing cattle stock and building a life in the then sparsely populated region. A more suitable log home was erected by 1901, which was later modernized and (as of 2006) still occupied by a family member. In 1912, with a new rail line being constructed through the Rosebud River valley dissecting the Springfield Ranche in the process, a need for a steam engine water supply tank and rail siding changed the setting permanently.

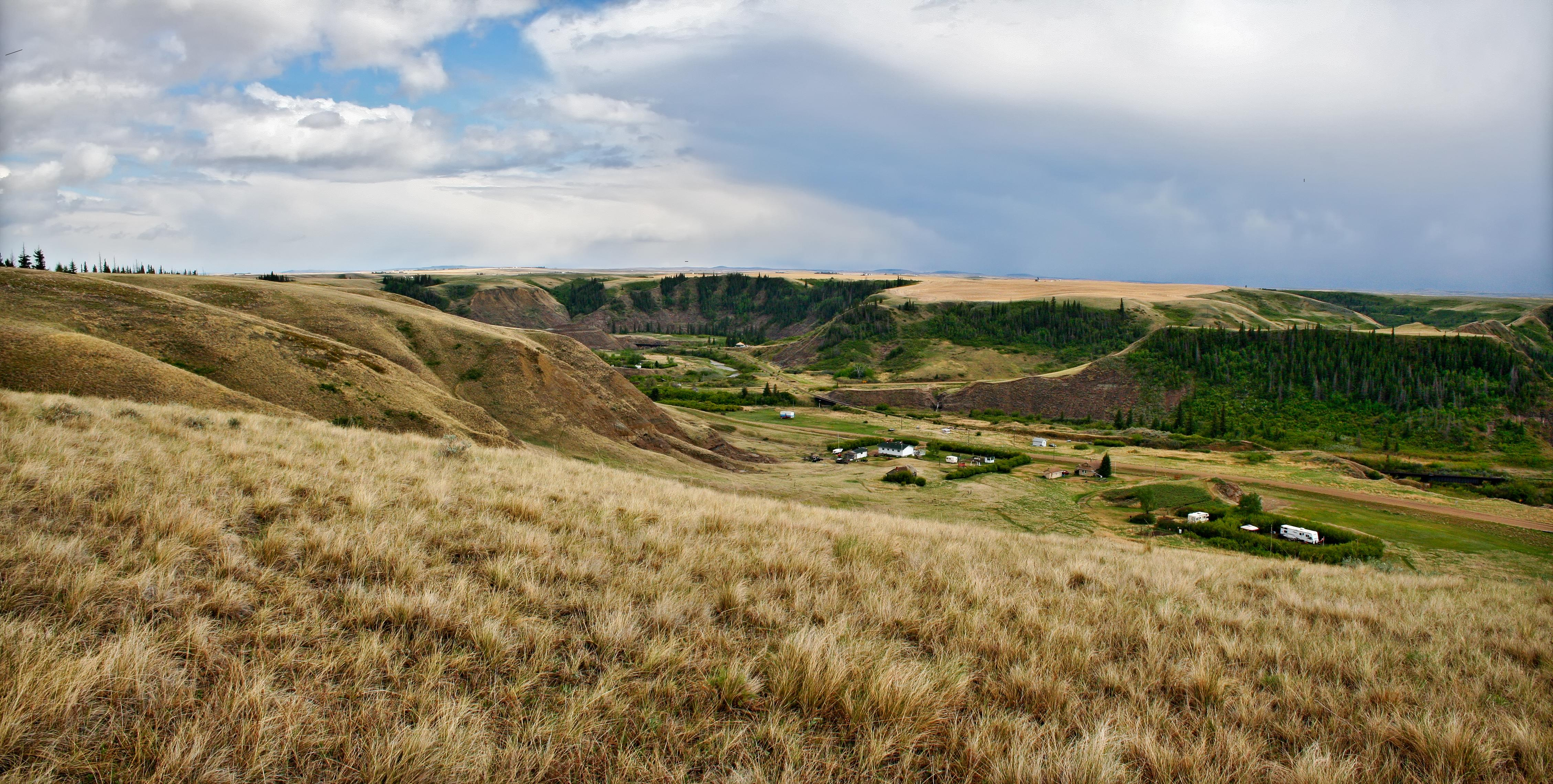
The Canyon in 2009.

Naming the rail siding "Beynon" after one of Biggs' given names began the development of a small village. On Biggs' property sprung up a country general store, blacksmith, school and little post office (both still standing as of 2006), and construction of two prairie style grain elevators on the rail siding. Corrals for the holding of cattle for transport were built, as was a 'Section house' for the rail line maintenance crews. By the late 1920s, Beynon was a small community, all built in the quarter section of property called Beynon, principally within the Springfield Ranch (now without the 'e' at the end).

With the increased mobility offered to communities in the region by the automobile, Beynon's future became less certain, and by the end of the 1940s it was clear that Beynon was not going to develop into a larger centre of population. In 1955, the general store closed permanently, with the Beynon School having closed in 1949. The post office closed in 1978. The grain elevators were both closed and removed by 1980, leaving only 3 inhabitable houses (all occupied as of 2006).

One of Biggs' four daughters, Myrtle Agnes Beynon "Bud" Biggs (1912–1998), developed into a conservationist and artist. With the reverting of the Beynon area to a more natural state, the establishing of an ecological preserve at Beynon began in earnest in 1968. By posting the Beynon property with "Ecological Preserve" signage, she became one of the regions most outspoken land stewards, promoting ecologically sensitive land use practices and sustainable conservation of habitat, by example. Biggs' family continue to use the Springfield Ranch house at Beynon and decided that never-developed property held by the family would be protected from development in perpetuity to ensure that future generations would be able to see an example of the region's unique beauty before development became the norm in the region.

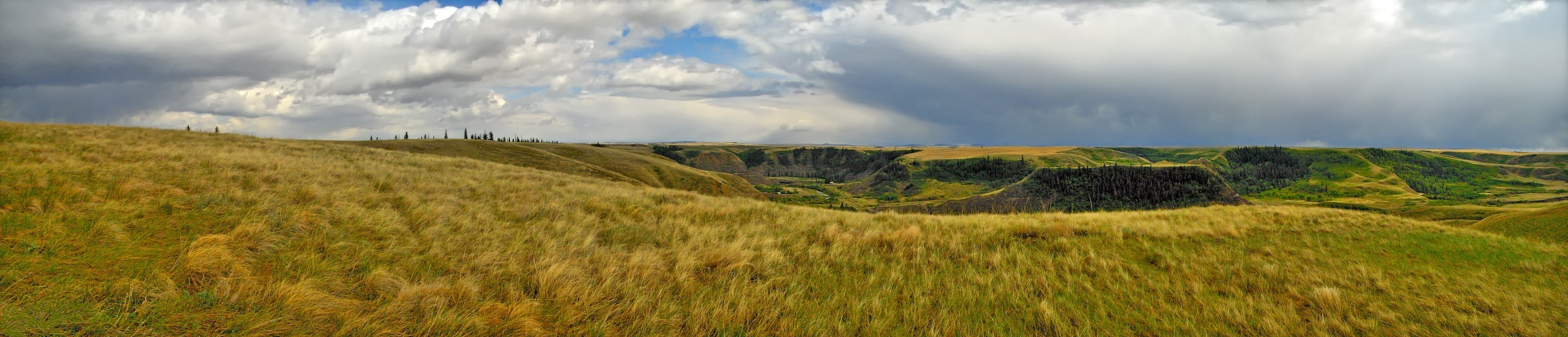
Panoramic vista at Beynon. Photographed by Jason Thomas.

== Trivia ==
The Beynon Canyon was featured in the cemetery scene from the 1978 film Superman: The Movie.

== External Resources ==
Prairie Town historial photos

Canadian Pacific Railway land examaination fonds from ucalgary archives

Photos from the Biggs family property
