= Sunnyslope, Alberta =

Sunnyslope
- Hamlet
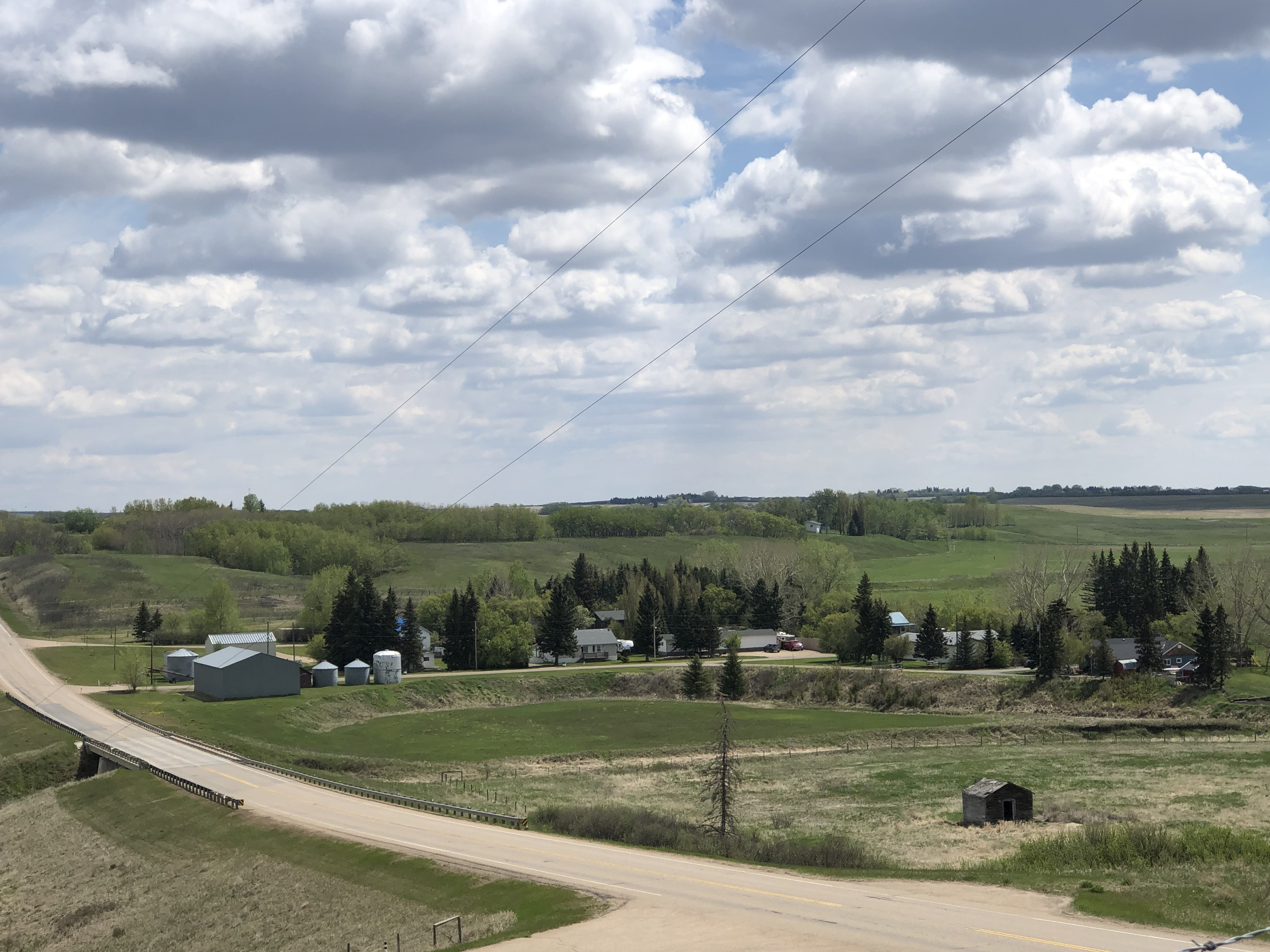

- Location of Sunnyslope Sunnyslope (Canada)
- Coordinates: 51°38′53″N 113°33′24″W
- Country: Canada
- Province: Alberta
- Region: Southern Alberta
- Census division: 5
- Municipal district: Kneehill County

Government
  - Type: Unincorporated
  - Governing body: Kneehill County Council

Area (2021)
  - Land: 0.17 km^{2} (0.066 sq mi)

Population (2021)
  - Total: 28
  - Density: 165.3/km^{2} (428/sq mi)
- Time zone: UTC−06:00 (Alberta Time)
- Area codes: 403, 587, 825

Sunnyslope is a hamlet in southern Alberta, Canada within Kneehill County. It is located on Highway 582, approximately 21 kilometres (13 mi) southwest of Three Hills and 40 kilometres (25 mi) east of Didsbury. The first post office was opened in 1903.

== Demographics ==
In the 2021 Census of Population conducted by Statistics Canada, Sunnyslope had a population of 28 living in 11 of its 11 total private dwellings, a change of −22.2% from its 2016 population of 36. With a land area of 0.17 km^{2} (0.066 sq mi), it had a population density of 164.7/km^{2} (426.6/sq mi) in 2021.

As a designated place in the 2016 Census of Population conducted by Statistics Canada, Sunnyslope had a population of 36 living in 13 of its 13 total private dwellings, a change of 38.5% from its 2011 population of 26. With a land area of 0.17 km^{2} (0.066 sq mi), it had a population density of 211.8/km^{2} (548.5/sq mi) in 2016.

== See also ==
- List of communities in Alberta
- List of designated places in Alberta
- List of hamlets in Alberta
