= Swalwell, Alberta =

Swalwell
- Hamlet
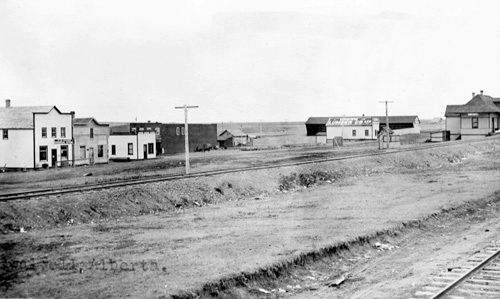
- Swalwell, circa 1920s

- Location of Swalwell in Alberta
- Coordinates: 51.5572°N 113.3183°W
- Country: Canada
- Province: Alberta
- Census division: No. 5
- Municipal district: Kneehill County

Government
  - Type: Unincorporated
  - Governing body: Kneehill County Council

Area (2021)
  - Land: 0.41 km^{2} (0.16 sq mi)
- Elevation: 899 m (2,949 ft)

Population (2021)
  - Total: 93
  - Density: 228.1/km^{2} (591/sq mi)
- Time zone: UTC−06:00 (Alberta Time)
- Postal code: T0M 1Y0

Swalwell is a hamlet in southern Alberta, Canada within Kneehill County. Previously an incorporated municipality, Swalwell dissolved from village status on January 1, 1946, to become part of the Municipal District of Norquay No. 279.

Swalwell is located approximately 100 km (62 mi) northeast of Calgary and 5 kilometres (3.1 mi) west of Highway 21. It is located on Canadian National Railway's Three Hills Subdivision between Three Hills and Beiseker. Swalwell has an elevation of 899 metres (2,949 ft).

The hamlet is located in Census Division No. 5 and the federal riding of Crowfoot.

== Demographics ==
In the 2021 Census of Population conducted by Statistics Canada, Swalwell had a population of 93 living in 48 of its 53 total private dwellings, a change of −2.1% from its 2016 population of 95. With a land area of 0.41 km^{2} (0.16 sq mi), it had a population density of 226.8/km^{2} (587.5/sq mi) in 2021.

As a designated place in the 2016 Census of Population conducted by Statistics Canada, Swalwell had a population of 95 living in 43 of its 45 total private dwellings, a change of −5.9% from its 2011 population of 101. With a land area of 0.41 km^{2} (0.16 sq mi), it had a population density of 231.7/km^{2} (600.1/sq mi) in 2016.

== See also ==
- List of communities in Alberta
- List of designated places in Alberta
- List of former urban municipalities in Alberta
- List of hamlets in Alberta
