= Hesketh, Alberta =

Hesketh
- Hamlet
- Location of Hesketh Hesketh (Canada)
- Coordinates: 51°28′13″N 112°58′31″W
- Country: Canada
- Province: Alberta
- Region: Southern Alberta
- Census division: 5
- Municipal district: Kneehill County

Government
  - Type: Unincorporated
  - Governing body: Kneehill County Council

Area (2021)
  - Land: 0.13 km^{2} (0.050 sq mi)

Population (2021)
  - Total: 10
  - Density: 75.3/km^{2} (195/sq mi)
- Time zone: UTC−06:00 (Alberta Time)
- Area codes: 403, 587, 825

Hesketh is a hamlet in southern Alberta, Canada within Kneehill County. It is located approximately 25 km (16 mi) west of Drumheller.

The community has the name of J. A. Hesketh, a railroad official.

== Demographics ==
Population history of Hesketh
Year	Pop.	±%
1986	13	—
1991	12	−7.7%
1991A	12	+0.0%
1996	14	+16.7%
2001	15	+7.1%
2006	15	+0.0%
2011	15	+0.0%
2016	10	−33.3%
2021	10	+0.0%
Source: Statistics Canada

In the 2021 Census of Population conducted by Statistics Canada, Hesketh had a population of 10 living in 6 of its 6 total private dwellings, a change of 0% from its 2016 population of 10. With a land area of 0.13 km^{2} (0.050 sq mi), it had a population density of 76.9/km^{2} (199.2/sq mi) in 2021.

As a designated place in the 2016 Census of Population conducted by Statistics Canada, Hesketh had a population of 10 living in 5 of its 5 total private dwellings, a change of −33.3% from its 2011 population of 15. With a land area of 0.13 km^{2} (0.050 sq mi), it had a population density of 76.9/km^{2} (199.2/sq mi) in 2016.

== See also ==
- List of communities in Alberta
- List of designated places in Alberta
- List of hamlets in Alberta
