= Penhold =

- Town
- Town of Penhold
- Motto: "Honouring The Past, Challenging The Future"
- Location of Penhold in Alberta
- Coordinates: 52°08′08″N 113°52′22″W
- Country: Canada
- Province: Alberta
- Region: Central Alberta
- Census division: 8
- Municipal district: Red Deer County
- Incorporated
  - Village: May 4, 1904
  - Town: September 1, 1980

Government
  - Mayor: Michael Yargeau
  - Governing body: Penhold Town Council

Area (2021)
  - Land: 11.2 km^{2} (4.3 sq mi)
- Elevation: 871 m (2,858 ft)

Population (2021)
  - Total: 3,484
  - Density: 311/km^{2} (810/sq mi)
- Time zone: UTC−06:00 (Alberta Time)
- Postal code span: T0M 1R0
- Highway: Highway 2A; Highway 42
- Waterway: Red Deer River
- Website: Official website

Penhold is a town in central Alberta, Canada. Penhold is surrounded by Red Deer County, 16 km (9.9 mi) south of Red Deer at the junction of Highway 2A and Highway 42. It is located 128 kilometres (80 mi) north of Calgary, east of the Red Deer River.

== History ==
Originally, Penhold was one of the many whistle stops along the Canadian Pacific Railway. It incorporated as the Village of Penhold in 1904. The origin of the name "Penhold" appears to have been around the time that the railroad siding named "Penhold" was established. Research has found no earlier instances of that name.

In 1981, the Village of Penhold incorporated as a town as a result of large population growth in the late 1970s.

== RCAF Penhold ==
During the second world war a Royal Canadian Air Force Station was established near the community. The station was closed in 1994.

== Demographics ==
In the 2021 Census of Population conducted by Statistics Canada, the Town of Penhold had a population of 3,484 living in 1,325 of its 1,396 total private dwellings, a change of 6% from its 2016 population of 3,287. With a land area of 11.2 km^{2} (4.3 sq mi), it had a population density of 311.1/km^{2} (805.7/sq mi) in 2021.

The population of the Town of Penhold according to its 2019 municipal census is 3,563, a change of 25.4% from its 2014 municipal census population of 2,842.

In the 2016 Census of Population conducted by Statistics Canada, the Town of Penhold recorded a population of 3,277 living in 1,235 of its 1,300 total private dwellings, a 38% change from its 2011 population of 2,375. With a land area of 5.29 km^{2} (2.04 sq mi), it had a population density of 619.5/km^{2} (1,604.4/sq mi) in 2016.

== Attractions ==
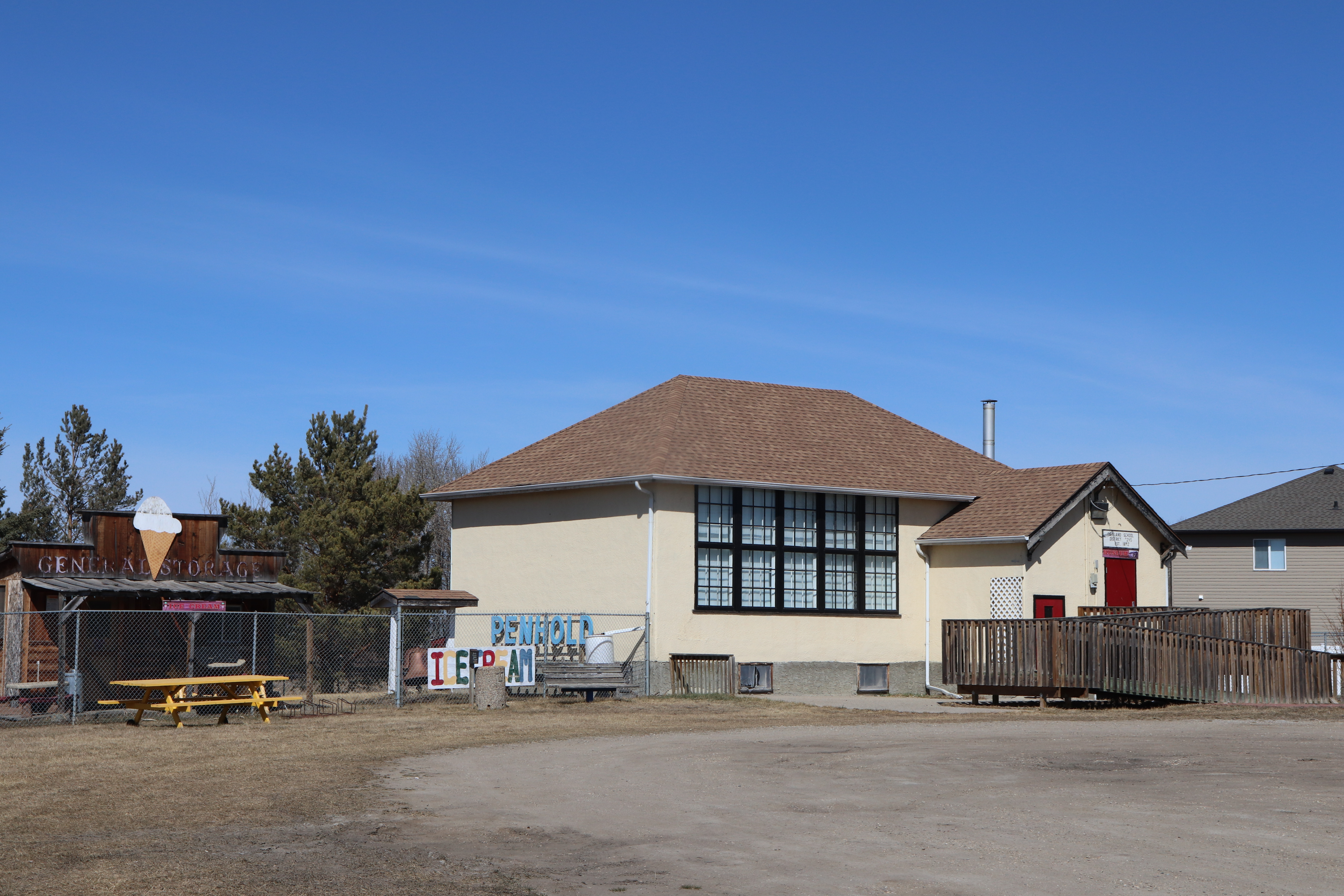
Penhold Museum

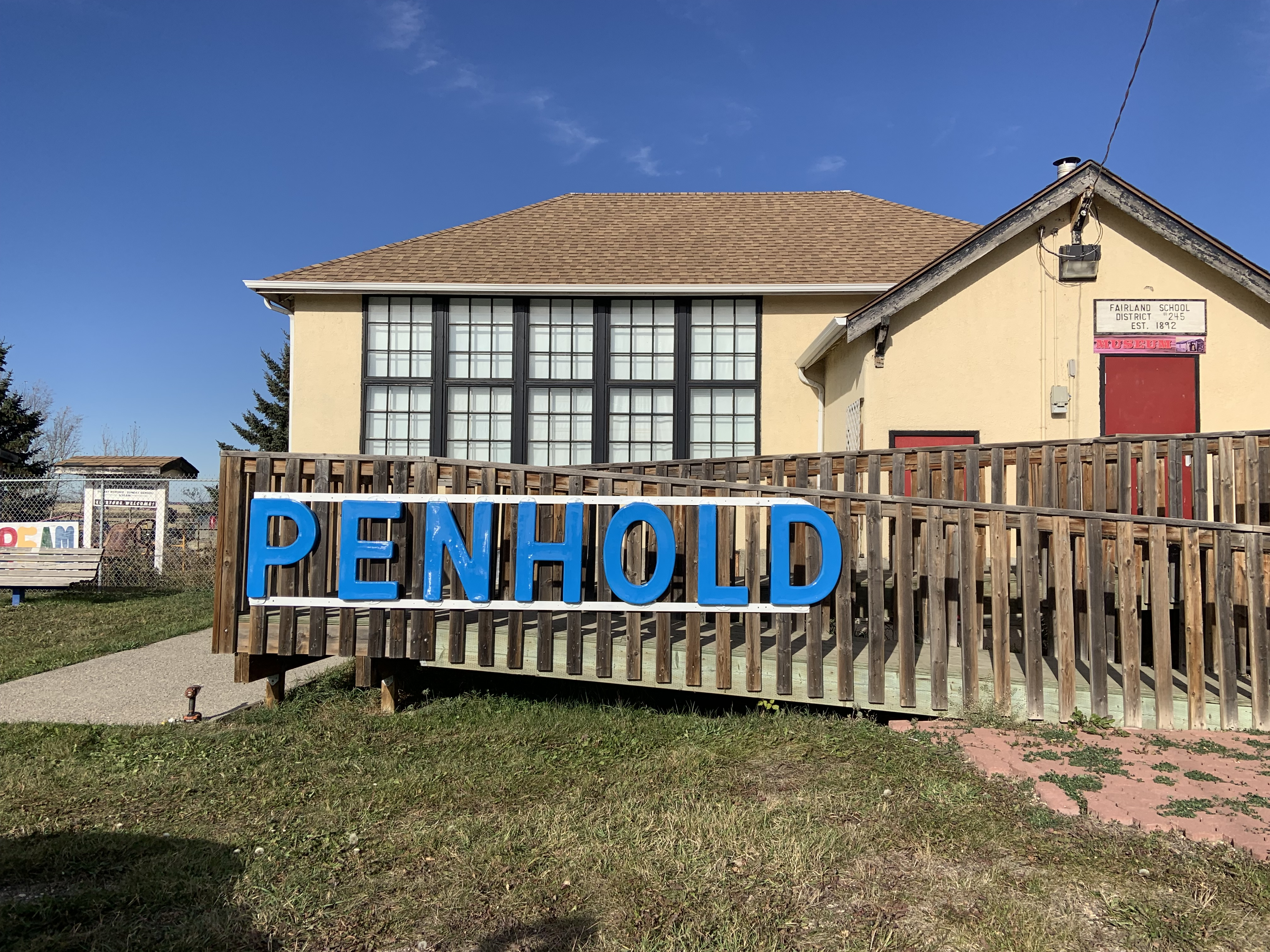
Penhold Museum, built in 1934 as a one room schoolhouse. The blue Penhold sign is from a UGG (United Grain Growers) grain tower that was 1 of 5 towers that used to line tracks in Penhold.

Attractions in Penhold include a museum with caboose, ice-cream & mini golf, a recreation centre with an indoor arena, a baseball diamond, library, a splash park, a campground, 18 hole disc golf, an outdoor ice rink, and a skate park/pump track. Two more ball diamonds, walking trails, 2 soccer fields, and the Penhold Church of Hope.

== Education ==
The town is home to three public schools of the Chinook's Edge School Division: Jessie Duncan (Pre-Kindergarten-Grade 3), Penhold Waskasoo Middle School (Grade 4–8), and Penhold Crossing Secondary (Grade 9–12).

== See also ==
- List of communities in Alberta
- List of towns in Alberta
