= Kneehill County =

Municipal district in Alberta, Canada

Coordinates: 51°42′26″N 113°15′52″W

- Municipal district
- Logo

- Major communities

- Location within Alberta
- Country: Canada
- Province: Alberta
- Region: Southern Alberta
- Planning region: Red Deer
- Established: 1944
- Incorporated: 1998

Government
  - Reeve: Jerry F. Wittstock
  - Governing body: Kneehill County Council
  - Administrative office: Three Hills

Area (2021)
  - Land: 3,373.4 km^{2} (1,302.5 sq mi)

Population (2021)
  - Total: 4,914
- Time zone: UTC−06:00 (Alberta Time)
- Website: kneehillcounty.com

Kneehill County is a municipal district in southern Alberta, Canada within Census Division No. 5.

== History ==
"The municipal history of Kneehill County began in when" [sic] "the Rural Municipality of Roach formed in 1913... In 1945, the Municipal District of Kneehill No. 278 renumbered as the Municipal District of Kneehill No. 48. In 1997, the Village of Torrington dissolved to become part of the Municipal District of Kneehill No. 48. In 1998, the Municipal District of Kneehill No. 48 became Kneehill County."

== Geography ==
=== Communities and localities ===
The following urban municipalities are surrounded by Kneehill County:

Cities

- none

Towns

- Three Hills (location of municipal office)
- Trochu

Villages

- Acme
- Carbon
- Linden

Summer villages

- none

The following hamlets are located within Kneehill County:

Hamlets

- Bircham
- Hesketh
- Huxley
- Sunnyslope
- Swalwell
- Torrington (dissolved from village status in December 1997)
- Wimborne

The following localities are located within Kneehill County:

Localities

- Allingham
- Bargrave
- Beynon
- Buoyant
- Cosway
- Curlew
- Dunphy
- Entice
- Equity
- Gatine
- Ghost Pine
- Ghost Pine Creek
- Grainger
- Helmer
- Highland Ranch
- Kirkpatrick
- Perbeck
- Sharples
- Taylor
- Tolman
- Twining (/ˈtwaɪnɪŋ/)

== Demographics ==
In the 2021 Census of Population conducted by Statistics Canada, Kneehill County had a population of 4,914 living in 1,715 of its 1,881 total private dwellings, a change of −1.7% from its 2016 population of 5,001. With a land area of 3,373.4 km^{2} (1,302.5 sq mi), it had a population density of 1.5/km^{2} (3.8/sq mi) in 2021.

In the 2016 Census of Population conducted by Statistics Canada, Kneehill County had a population of 5,001 living in 1,722 of its 1,859 total private dwellings, a 1.6% change from its 2011 population of 4,921. With a land area of 3,381.02 km^{2} (1,305.42 sq mi), it had a population density of 1.5/km^{2} (3.8/sq mi) in 2016.

== See also ==
- List of communities in Alberta
- List of municipal districts in Alberta
