= Duhamel, Alberta =

Hamlet in Alberta, Canada

Duhamel
- Hamlet
- Location of Duhamel Duhamel (Canada)
- Coordinates: 52°54′56″N 112°57′48″W
- Country: Canada
- Province: Alberta
- Region: Central Alberta
- Census division: 10
- Municipal district: Camrose County

Government
  - Type: Unincorporated
  - Governing body: Camrose County Council

Area (2021)
  - Land: 1.25 km^{2} (0.48 sq mi)

Population (2021)
  - Total: 46
  - Density: 36.7/km^{2} (95/sq mi)
- Time zone: UTC−06:00 (Alberta Time)
- Area codes: 780, 587, 825

Duhamel is a hamlet in the central Alberta, Canada within Camrose County. It is located on Highway 21, approximately 100 kilometres (62 mi) southeast of Edmonton and 20 kilometres (12 mi) southwest of Camrose, Duhamel's closest major trading centre.

== History ==
An early trading post was situated 2–3 miles northwest of the hamlet's current site, directly on a well-used ford of the Battle River. The trading post was a key point for exchange between the First Nations people, fur traders, and the Hudson's Bay Company. The establishment of the Metis Settlement dates back to early 1800s.

The settlement that grew around the post took the names Battle River Crossing and Salois's settlement or Abraham's settlement, after Abraham Salois, a prominent Metis farmer and freighter. It was also known as Laboucane, after the Laboucane brothers and their families, who were among the first local residents.

A church was built in 1883 for the service of Father Bellevaire, and was visited by Bishop Grandin, who named the settlement after Joseph-Thomas Duhamel.

Around 1886, the post was moved to the site where Highway 21 now crosses the river (52°57′N 112°58′W).

In 1910, Duhamel moved to its present location on the newly constructed Grand Trunk Pacific rail line from Tofield to Calgary. The Duhamel/Battle River rail bridge was one of the largest wooden rail bridges ever constructed, at 3,972 feet (1210 m) in length and 120 feet (32 m) in height.

== Demographics ==
Population history of Duhamel
Year	Pop.	±%
1981	27	—
1986	28	+3.7%
1991	20	−28.6%
1996	35	+75.0%
2001	38	+8.6%
2006	35	−7.9%
2011	30	−14.3%
2016	47	+56.7%
2021	46	−2.1%
Source: Statistics Canada

In the 2021 Census of Population conducted by Statistics Canada, Duhamel had a population of 46 living in 17 of its 18 total private dwellings, a change of −2.1% from its 2016 population of 47. With a land area of 1.25 km^{2} (0.48 sq mi), it had a population density of 36.8/km^{2} (95.3/sq mi) in 2021.

As a designated place in the 2016 Census of Population conducted by Statistics Canada, Duhamel had a population of 47 living in 18 of its 18 total private dwellings, a change of 56.7% from its 2011 population of 30. With a land area of 1.25 km^{2} (0.48 sq mi), it had a population density of 37.6/km^{2} (97.4/sq mi) in 2016.

== Crop circles ==
Crop circles appeared in a farmer's field in Duhamel in 1967. At the time, crop circles were virtually unknown. The discovery of the circles was preceded by reports of UFO sightings around the town.

A farmer by the name of Schielke discovered the strange occurrence on Saturday, August 5, 1967, after a night of heavy rains. This was the first time he had been to his fields in weeks, so the circles could have appeared at any time during that period. The circles were composed of four circular marks approximately 30 feet (9.1 m) in diameter. Schielke always stressed that the marks could not have been made by his equipment, and that he did not believe in UFOs.

The marks varied from five to seven inches wide, and the smallest circular mark was 31 ft., 9 in. in diameter. Three of the rings were essentially circular, with the largest mark being slightly elliptical, varying from 34 ft., 5 in. to 36 ft., 3 in. There were no exhaust blasts, scorch marks or disturbances of the soil, and vegetation within the circles had apparently been removed by the object that made the marks. The official investigation report implies that the marks were most likely left by a 135-ton aircraft or spacecraft.

This case is described as "unsolved" by Canada's Department of National Defence.

== See also ==
- List of communities in Alberta
- List of designated places in Alberta
- List of hamlets in Alberta
