= Delburne =

- Village
- Village of Delburne
- Motto: Your Success is Our Success
- Location in Alberta
- Coordinates: 52°12′03.1″N 113°14′01.1″W
- Country: Canada
- Province: Alberta
- Region: Central Alberta
- Census division: 8
- Municipal district: Red Deer County
- Incorporated
  - Village: January 17, 1913

Government
  - Mayor: Jeff Bourne
  - Governing body: Delburne Village Council

Area (2021)
  - Land: 3.79 km^{2} (1.46 sq mi)
- Elevation: 865 m (2,838 ft)

Population (2021)
  - Total: 919
  - Density: 242.8/km^{2} (629/sq mi)
- Time zone: UTC−06:00 (Alberta Time)
- Postal code: T0M 0V0
- Highways: Highway 21
- Waterway: Delburne Lakes
- Website: Official website

Delburne /ˈdɛlbərn/ is a village in the central region of Alberta, Canada, approximately 40 km east of Red Deer.

Delburne is named for Delia Mewburn, sister of pioneer physician F.H. Mewburn. Delburne is an agricultural community located in the centre of Alberta's parkland region. The village has tree lined streets and murals which depict historical events on the sides of buildings.

Delburne amenities include a nine-hole golf and country club, a campground, several coffee shops/restaurants, and sporting facilities such as a curling rink, hockey rink, baseball diamond and an equestrian centre. The village also has a school, library, bank/credit union, post office, laundromat, grocery stores, gas station, and other basic services.

Delburne is home to the Anthony Henday Museum, which offers guided tours.

== Demographics ==
In the 2021 Census of Population conducted by Statistics Canada, the Village of Delburne had a population of 919 living in 400 of its 453 total private dwellings, a change of 3% from its 2016 population of 892. With a land area of 3.79 km^{2} (1.46 sq mi), it had a population density of 242.5/km^{2} (628.0/sq mi) in 2021.

In the 2016 Census of Population conducted by Statistics Canada, the Village of Delburne recorded a population of 892 living in 380 of its 394 total private dwellings, a 7.5% change from its 2011 population of 830. With a land area of 3.98 km^{2} (1.54 sq mi), it had a population density of 224.1/km^{2} (580.5/sq mi) in 2016.

== See also ==
- List of communities in Alberta
- List of villages in Alberta
