= Gatine, Alberta =

Coordinates: 51.46682°N 112.91858°W

Location of Gatine, Alberta

Gatine is a locality in Alberta, Canada.

The locality has the name of one Mrs. Gatine, a railroad employee.
