= Trochu, Alberta =

Trochu
- Town
- Town of Trochu
- Location of Trochu in Alberta
- Coordinates: 51°49′25″N 113°13′58″W
- Country: Canada
- Province: Alberta
- Region: Central Alberta
- Census division: 5
- Municipal district: Kneehill County
- Incorporated
  - Village: May 5, 1911
  - Town: August 1, 1962

Government
  - Mayor: Jenny Lyver
  - Governing body: Trochu Town Council
  - MP: Pierre Poilievre
  - MLA: Tara Sawyer

Area (2021)
  - Land: 2.78 km^{2} (1.07 sq mi)
- Elevation: 872 m (2,861 ft)

Population (2021)
  - Total: 998
  - Density: 359.5/km^{2} (931/sq mi)
- Time zone: UTC−06:00 (Alberta Time)
- Highways: Highway 21; Highway 27; Highway 585
- Waterway: Ghostpine Creek
- Website: Official website

Trochu /ˈtroʊʃuː/ is a town in central Alberta, Canada that is surrounded by Kneehill County. It is approximately 15 km (9.3 mi) north of Three Hills at the junction of Highway 21 and Highway 585.

The town is named for Armand Trochu, who founded the St. Anne Ranch Trading Company on the present site of the town in 1903. Ranchers and settlers started arriving in the late 1890s.

== Geography ==
=== Climate ===
Climate data for Trochu (1981-2010)
Month	Jan	Feb	Mar	Apr	May	Jun	Jul	Aug	Sep	Oct	Nov	Dec	Year
Record high °C (°F)	13.0 (55.4)	17.5 (63.5)	20.5 (68.9)	29.0 (84.2)	34.5 (94.1)	35.5 (95.9)	37.0 (98.6)	35.5 (95.9)	34.0 (93.2)	29.5 (85.1)	22.5 (72.5)	15.0 (59.0)	37.0 (98.6)
Mean daily maximum °C (°F)	−5.7 (21.7)	−2.4 (27.7)	2.8 (37.0)	11.6 (52.9)	17.6 (63.7)	21.3 (70.3)	23.7 (74.7)	23.8 (74.8)	17.8 (64.0)	10.9 (51.6)	0.9 (33.6)	−4.7 (23.5)	9.8 (49.6)
Daily mean °C (°F)	−11.1 (12.0)	−7.8 (18.0)	−2.7 (27.1)	4.8 (40.6)	10.6 (51.1)	14.7 (58.5)	16.9 (62.4)	16.5 (61.7)	10.9 (51.6)	4.4 (39.9)	−4 (25)	−9.7 (14.5)	3.6 (38.5)
Mean daily minimum °C (°F)	−16.3 (2.7)	−13.2 (8.2)	−8.1 (17.4)	−2 (28)	3.7 (38.7)	8.1 (46.6)	9.9 (49.8)	9.1 (48.4)	4.0 (39.2)	−2.1 (28.2)	−8.9 (16.0)	−14.6 (5.7)	−2.5 (27.5)
Record low °C (°F)	−40.5 (−40.9)	−40.5 (−40.9)	−34 (−29)	−22 (−8)	−6 (21)	−1.5 (29.3)	−2 (28)	−2 (28)	−8 (18)	−24.5 (−12.1)	−33.5 (−28.3)	−39 (−38)	−40.5 (−40.9)
Average precipitation mm (inches)	15.2 (0.60)	9.8 (0.39)	22.7 (0.89)	19.7 (0.78)	50.5 (1.99)	78.8 (3.10)	77.0 (3.03)	60.9 (2.40)	45.1 (1.78)	13.4 (0.53)	12.9 (0.51)	10.8 (0.43)	416.6 (16.40)
Source: Environment Canada

== Demographics ==
In the 2021 Census of Population conducted by Statistics Canada, the Town of Trochu had a population of 998 living in 428 of its 469 total private dwellings, a change of −5.7% from its 2016 population of 1,058. With a land area of 2.78 km^{2} (1.07 sq mi), it had a population density of 359.0/km^{2} (929.8/sq mi) in 2021.

In the 2016 Census of Population conducted by Statistics Canada, the Town of Trochu recorded a population of 1,058 living in 421 of its 472 total private dwellings, a −1.3% change from its 2011 population of 1,072. With a land area of 2.78 km^{2} (1.07 sq mi), it had a population density of 380.6/km^{2} (985.7/sq mi) in 2016.

The Town of Trochu's 2012 municipal census counted a population of 1,067, a 4.1% decrease from its 2009 municipal census population of 1,113.

== Economy ==
The main industry is agriculture, though the oil and gas industry is bringing more and more revenue into the area.

== Attractions ==
Trochu is home to an arboretum, which is home to over 1,000 trees and shrubs of over 100 species, as well as various native and non-native flowering plant species, and showy floral displays.

Trochu also has a local museum and has recreational venues including an arena, an outdoor swimming pool, a campground and ball diamonds.

The town is home to "The World's Tallest Golf Tee", which towers 40 ft tall. It is located just outside the Trochu Golf and Country Club.

== Infrastructure ==
Amenities in Trochu include a youth centre, a seniors' drop-in centre and an extended care facility (formerly the Trochu Hospital)

== Notable people ==
- Martin Farndale, military general in the British Army and Knight Commander of the Order of the Bath
- Kevin Haller, Stanley Cup Champion with the Montreal Canadiens in 1993
- Al Purvis, gold medalist Olympian ice hockey player

== See also ==
- List of communities in Alberta
- List of towns in Alberta
