= Bashaw, Alberta =

Town in Alberta, Canada

Bashaw
- Town
- Town of Bashaw
- Motto: We want you here with us
- Location of Bashaw in Alberta Bashaw (Canada)
- Coordinates: 52°35′0″N 112°58′17″W
- Country: Canada
- Province: Alberta
- Region: Central Alberta
- Census division: 10
- Municipal district: Camrose County
- Incorporated
  - Village: August 18, 1911
  - Town: May 1, 1964

Government
  - Mayor: Cindy Orom
  - Governing body: Bashaw Town Council
  - MP: Pierre Poilievre (Battle River—Crowfoot)

Area (2021)
  - Land: 2.72 km^{2} (1.05 sq mi)
- Elevation: 793 m (2,602 ft)

Population (2021)
  - Total: 848
  - Density: 311.9/km^{2} (808/sq mi)
- Time zone: UTC−06:00 (Alberta Time)
- Postal code span: T0B-0H0
- Highways: Highway 21; Highway 53
- Waterways: Buffalo Lake; Red Deer Lake
- Website: Official website

Bashaw /ˈbæʃɔː/ is a town in central Alberta, Canada. It is at the junction of Highway 21 and Highway 53.

The community has the name of Eugene Bashaw, an original owner of the town site.

The town's post office dates from 1910.

== Demographics ==
In the 2021 Census of Population conducted by Statistics Canada, the Town of Bashaw had a population of 848 living in 381 of its 415 total private dwellings, a change of 2.2% from its 2016 population of 830. With a land area of 2.72 km^{2} (1.05 sq mi), it had a population density of 311.8/km^{2} (807.5/sq mi) in 2021.

In the 2016 Census of Population conducted by Statistics Canada, the Town of Bashaw recorded a population of 830 living in 379 of its 418 total private dwellings, a −4.9% change from its 2011 population of 873. With a land area of 2.99 km^{2} (1.15 sq mi), it had a population density of 277.6/km^{2} (719.0/sq mi) in 2016.

== Notable people ==
- Brad Berry, ice hockey coach and former professional player
- Darren Throop, founder of Entertainment One

== See also ==
- List of communities in Alberta
- List of francophone communities in Alberta
- List of towns in Alberta
