= Alberta Highway 10 =

Highway in Alberta

Highway 10
- Hoo Doo Trail
- Highway 10 highlighted in red and Highway 10X highlighted in blue

Route information
- Maintained by the Ministry of Transportation and Economic Corridors
- Length: 21.9 km (13.6 mi)

Major junctions
- West end: Highway 9 / Highway 56 in Drumheller
- Highway 10X in Rosedale; Highway 56 near Rosedale; Highway 570 near East Coulee
- East end: Highway 569 at Western Monarch

Location
- Country: Canada
- Province: Alberta
- Towns: Drumheller

Highway system
- Alberta Numbered Highway Network; List; Former
| ← Highway 9 | → Highway 11 |

Highway 10 is a 22 km (14 mi) highway in southern Alberta, Canada that forms a part of Hoo Doo Trail. It is located wholly within the Town of Drumheller as a result of the former City of Drumheller's amalgamation with the Municipal District of Badlands No. 7 on January 1, 1998. It begins at Highway 9 in the heart of Drumheller and extends southeast along the Red Deer River where it passes through Rosedale, then crosses Highway 56 and travels through East Coulee. It ends at the entrance to the Atlas Coal Mine, a National Historic Site of Canada since 2001, where it continues as Highway 569.

The communities along the route — Rosedale, East Coulee, and (via Highway 10X) Wayne — developed as coal-mining settlements during the first half of the twentieth century, when the Drumheller valley was Alberta's most productive coalfield.

== Route description ==
Highway 10 is 22 km (14 mi) long. The route begins at a signalized intersection with Highway 9 in central Drumheller approximately 400 m (1,300 ft) south of the Red Deer River. Continuing as four-lane Railway Avenue southeast through the river valley concurrent with Highway 56 at a speed limit of 50 km/h (31 mph), the highway exits the Drumheller main townsite. It becomes to a two-lane rural highway with a speed limit of 100 km/h (62 mph) as it passes the Drumheller Regional Landfill and jogs to within 100 m (330 ft) of the Red Deer River. The highway continues for another 4 km (2.5 mi) and enters Rosedale where the limit again reduces to 50 km/h. Just prior to crossing the Red Deer River, Highway 10X splits to the southwest from the combined Highway 10/56, paralleling the Rosebud River.

Highway 10/56 continues across the Rosebud River, exiting Rosedale where the speed limit again increases to 100 km/h. East of Rosedale, Highway 56 splits due south toward Dalum and Hussar, while Highway 10 continues to the southeast to Cambria after which it crosses the Red Deer River. Highway 849 then splits to the north en route to Michichi and Highway 10 continues east paralleling the river, now on its north bank. Highway 573 is the next to split from Highway 10. It proceeds due east while Highway 10 continues southeast through the scenic river valley to Lehigh and East Coulee, a former coal-mining community that had a population of approximately 3,000 at its mid-1940s peak before declining sharply as regional coal production contracted in the 1950s. East of Lehigh, the road continues east along the north river bank to Dorothy as Highway 570, while Highway 10 veers to the south across the river. Just to the south of the river, Highway 10 ends at the entrance to the Atlas Coal Mine and continues as Highway 569. The mine operated from 1936 to 1974 and preserves one of Canada's last surviving wooden mine tipples; it was designated a National Historic Site in 2001 for its role in the history of coal production in the Drumheller valley.

== Major intersections ==
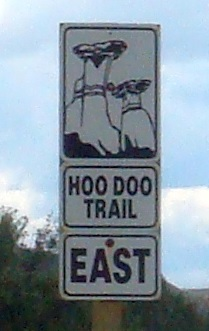
The Hoo Doo Trail sign.

Starting from the west end of Highway 10. The entire route is in Drumheller.

| Location | km | mi | Destinations | Notes |
|---|---|---|---|---|
| Drumheller | −0.9 | −0.56 | Highway 575 west (South Dinosaur Trail) – Nacmine Highway 9 east / Highway 56 north – Hanna, Stettler | |
| Drumheller | 0.0 | 0.0 | Highway 9 west / 5 Street SE – Calgary | Highway 10 western terminus; west end of Highway 56 concurrency |
| Rosedale | 6.7 | 4.2 | Highway 10X south – Wayne | |
| | 8.1 | 5.0 | Highway 56 south – Hussar, Highway 1 | East end of Highway 56 concurrency |
| Cambria | 10.0 | 6.2 | | |
| | 10.3 | 6.4 | Crosses the Red Deer River | |
| | 10.8 | 6.7 | Highway 849 north | |
| | 15.3 | 9.5 | Highway 573 east | |
| Lehigh | 18.1 | 11.2 | | |
| East Coulee | 19.8 | 12.3 | | |
| | 21.4 | 13.3 | Highway 570 east – Dorothy, Highway 36 | |
| | 21.6 | 13.4 | Crosses the Red Deer River | |
| Western Monarch | 21.9 | 13.6 | Highway 569 south / Atlas Coal Mine entrance west – Dalum | Highway 10 eastern terminus; continues as Highway 569 |
1.000 mi = 1.609 km; 1.000 km = 0.621 mi: Closed/former; Concurrency terminus; Route transition

== Highway 10X ==
Highway 10X
- Location: Drumheller
- Length: 5.6 km (3.5 mi)

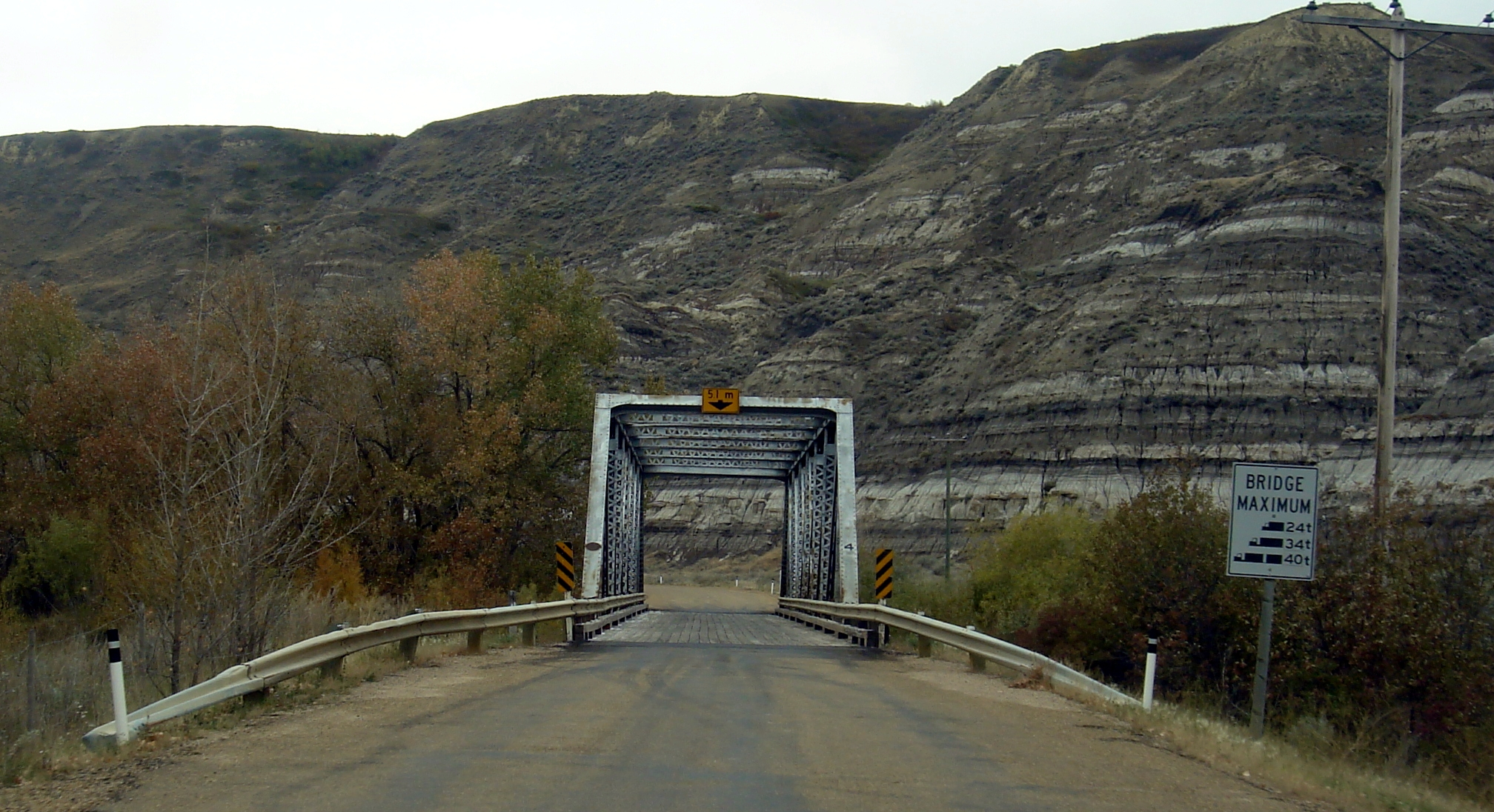
Highway 10X bridge over Rosebud River (one of nine)

Highway 10X is a 5.6 km (3.5 mi) spur of Highway 10 that runs for 5.6 km (3.5 mi), connecting Wayne with Highway 10. Following the amalgamation of the former City of Drumheller with the Municipal District of Badlands No. 7 on January 1, 1998, the entire highway falls within the Town of Drumheller. The road follows the course of the Rosebud River through a 100–150 m deep canyon. Nine bridges lead the road from one side of the river to the other, and most of the bridges are paralleled by railroad bridges of a presently abandoned track that used to cart coal from the Wayne mine. At its end, Highway 10X continues as Excelsior Avenue, which crosses the Rosebud River twice more, before splitting into Range Road 195A and Township Road 280A.

=== Major intersections ===
| Location | km | mi | Destinations | Notes |
|---|---|---|---|---|
| Rosedale | 0.0 | 0.0 | Highway 10 / Highway 56 – Drumheller, East Coulee | Northern terminus |
| Wayne | 5.6 | 3.5 | Excelsior Avenue | Southern terminus |
1.000 mi = 1.609 km; 1.000 km = 0.621 mi
