= Western Monarch =

- Former hamlet
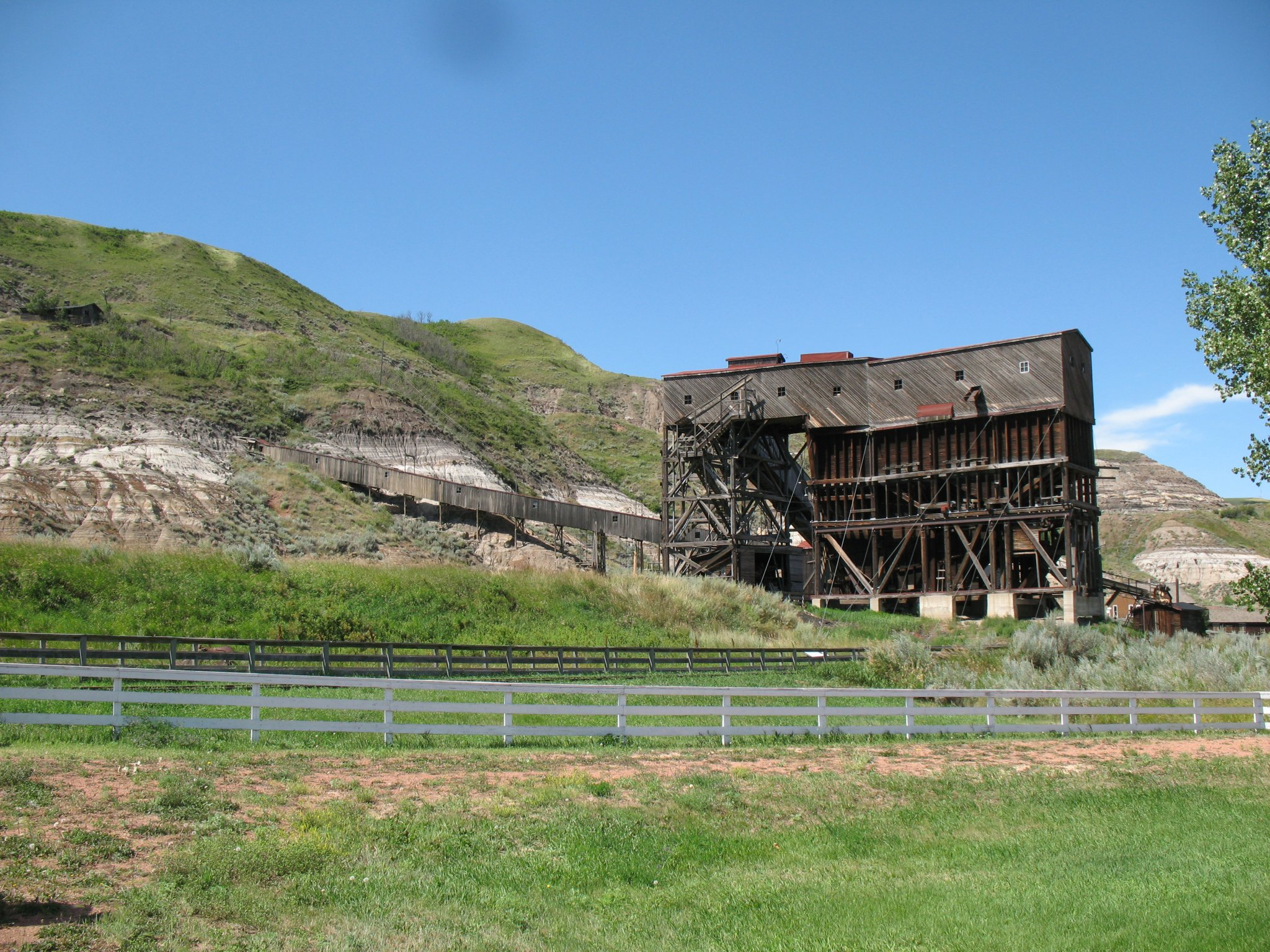
- Tipple and main ore conveyor at the adjacent Atlas Coal Mine

- Location within Town of Drumheller Location within Alberta
- Coordinates: 51.330°N 112.481°W
- Country: Canada
- Province: Alberta
- Municipality: Town of Drumheller

Government
  - Mayor: Heather Colberg
  - Governing body: Drumheller Town Council: Lisa Hansen-Zacharuk; Patrick Kolafa; Tony Lacher; Stephanie Price; Crystal Sereda; Tom Zariski

Population (1992)
  - Total: 10
- Time zone: UTC−06:00 (Alberta Time)
- Area codes: 403, 587, 825

Western Monarch, also known as Atlas, is a former hamlet in central Alberta that is now a community within the Town of Drumheller.

== History ==
The adjacent Atlas Coal Mine was operational from 1936 to 1974. Western Monarch registered population counts of 189 and 153 in the 1956 and 1961 federal censuses respectively. Prior to 1992, the community was previously a hamlet under the jurisdiction of Wheatland County. It was annexed into the neighbouring Municipal District (MD) of Badlands No. 7 on December 31, 1992. The MD of Badlands No. 7 then amalgamated with the City of Drumheller on January 1, 1998 to become the Town of Drumheller.

== Geography ==
Western Monarch is on Highway 569 along the south side of the Red Deer River opposite East Coulee.

== Demographics ==
Population history of Western Monarch
Year	Pop.	±%
1956	189	—
1961	153	−19.0%
Source: Statistics Canada

At the time of annexation in 1992, Western Monarch was estimated to have a population of 10.

== Attractions ==
The community is adjacent to the Altas Coal Mine Museum, which became part of the Atlas No. 3 Coal Mine National Historic Site of Canada on October 17, 2001.

== See also ==
- List of communities in Alberta
