= Newcastle, Alberta =

Newcastle
- Former hamlet
- Location of Newcastle in Alberta
- Coordinates: 51.464°N 112.736°W
- Country: Canada
- Province: Alberta
- Census division: No. 5
- Municipality: Town of Drumheller
- Incorporated (village): March 16, 1923
- Dissolved: May 21, 1931
- Annexed: 1967

Government
  - Mayor: Heather Colberg
  - Governing body: Drumheller Town Council: Lisa Hansen-Zacharuk; Patrick Kolafa; Tony Lacher; Stephanie Price; Crystal Sereda; Tom Zariski
- Time zone: UTC−06:00 (Alberta Time)
- Area codes: 403, 587, 825

Newcastle is a community within the Town of Drumheller, Alberta, Canada. It held village status for eight years between 1923 and 1931, and was recognized as a hamlet prior to annexation by Drumheller in 1967. The community is located within the Red Deer River valley on South Dinosaur Trail (Highway 838), approximately 2 km (1.2 mi) west of Drumheller's main townsite. The former hamlet of Midlandvale is located across the river to the north.

== History ==
Newcastle was incorporated as a village on March 16, 1923. It subsequently dissolved from village status on May 21, 1931. Newcastle was eventually annexed by the former City of Drumheller from the former Municipal District of Badlands No. 7 (then Improvement District No. 7) in 1967.

== Demographics ==
Population history of Newcastle (1926-1961)
Year	Pop.	±%
1926	281	—
1931	304	+8.2%
1936	1,278	+320.4%
1941	1,000	−21.8%
1951	1,317	+31.7%
1956	1,132	−14.0%
1961	949	−16.2%
Source: Statistics Canada

Population history of Newcastle (1961-1966 including Bankview)
Year	Pop.	±%
1961	1,276	—
1966	960	−24.8%
Source: Statistics Canada

Over the course of its incorporation, Newcastle had a population of 281 and 304 in 1926 and 1931 respectively. Despite its dissolution in 1931, the former village grew to a population of 1,278 in 1936 and peaked at a population of 1,317 in 1951. It then declined to a population of 949 in 1961.

== See also ==
- List of communities in Alberta
- List of former urban municipalities in Alberta
