= Cambria, Alberta =

Cambria
- Former hamlet
- Location of Cambria in Alberta
- Coordinates: 51.399°N 112.595°W
- Country: Canada
- Province: Alberta
- Census division: No. 5
- Municipality: Town of Drumheller

Government
  - Mayor: Heather Colberg
  - Governing body: Drumheller Town Council: Lisa Hansen-Zacharuk; Patrick Kolafa; Tony Lacher; Stephanie Price; Crystal Sereda; Tom Zariski
- Time zone: UTC−06:00 (Alberta Time)
- Area codes: 403, 587, 825

Cambria is a community within the Town of Drumheller, Alberta, Canada. It was previously a hamlet within the former Municipal District (MD) of Badlands No. 7 prior to the MD's amalgamation with the former City of Drumheller on January 1, 1998.

Cambria is located within the Red Deer River valley on Highway 10, approximately 10 km (6.2 mi) southeast of Drumheller's main townsite and 110 km (68 mi) northeast of Calgary. The community is within Census Division No. 5 and in the federal riding of Crowfoot.

Population history of Cambria
Year	Pop.	±%
1951	239	—
1956	130	−45.6%
1961	80	−38.5%
1966	88	+10.0%
1971	49	−44.3%
1976	39	−20.4%
1981	36	−7.7%
1986	29	−19.4%
1991	42	+44.8%
Source: Statistics Canada

== See also ==
- List of communities in Alberta
