= Bankview =

Bankview may refer to:

- Bankview, Alberta, now part of Drumheller, Alberta, Canada
- Bankview, Calgary, a neighbourhood in Canada
