= Lehigh, Alberta =

Lehigh
- Former hamlet
- Location of Lehigh in Alberta
- Coordinates: 51.354°N 112.514°W
- Country: Canada
- Province: Alberta
- Census division: No. 5
- Municipality: Town of Drumheller

Government
  - Mayor: Heather Colberg
  - Governing body: Drumheller Town Council: Lisa Hansen-Zacharuk; Patrick Kolafa; Tony Lacher; Stephanie Price; Crystal Sereda; Tom Zariski
- Time zone: UTC−06:00 (Alberta Time)
- Area codes: 403, 587, 825

Lehigh is a community within the Town of Drumheller, Alberta, Canada. It was previously a hamlet within the former Municipal District (MD) of Badlands No. 7 prior to the MD's amalgamation with the former City of Drumheller on January 1, 1998.

Lehigh is located within the Red Deer River valley on Highway 10, approximately 18 km (11 mi) southeast of Drumheller's main townsite and 113 km (70 mi) northeast of Calgary. The community is within Census Division No. 5 and in the federal riding of Crowfoot.

Population history of Lehigh
Year	Pop.	±%
1941	133	—
1951	88	−33.8%
1986	21	−76.1%
1991	23	+9.5%
Source: Statistics Canada

== See also ==
- List of communities in Alberta
