= North Drumheller =

- Former hamlet
- Location of North Drumheller in Alberta
- Coordinates: 51.470°N 112.715°W
- Country: Canada
- Province: Alberta
- Census division: No. 5
- Municipality: Town of Drumheller
- Annexed: 1967

Government
  - Mayor: Heather Colberg
  - Governing body: Drumheller Town Council: Lisa Hansen-Zacharuk; Patrick Kolafa; Tony Lacher; Stephanie Price; Crystal Sereda; Tom Zariski
- Time zone: UTC−06:00 (Alberta Time)
- Area codes: 403, 587, 825

North Drumheller is a community within the Town of Drumheller, Alberta, Canada. It was previously a hamlet within the former Municipal District of Badlands No. 7 (then Improvement District No. 7) prior to being annexed by Drumheller in 1967. The community is located within the Red Deer River valley at the intersection of Highway 9 and North Dinosaur Trail (Highway 838) on the north side of the river across from Drumheller's main townsite.

Population history of North Drumheller
Year	Pop.	±%
1956	344	—
1961	429	+24.7%
1966	400	−6.8%
Source: Statistics Canada

== See also ==
- List of communities in Alberta
