= Wayne, Alberta =

Wayne
- Former hamlet
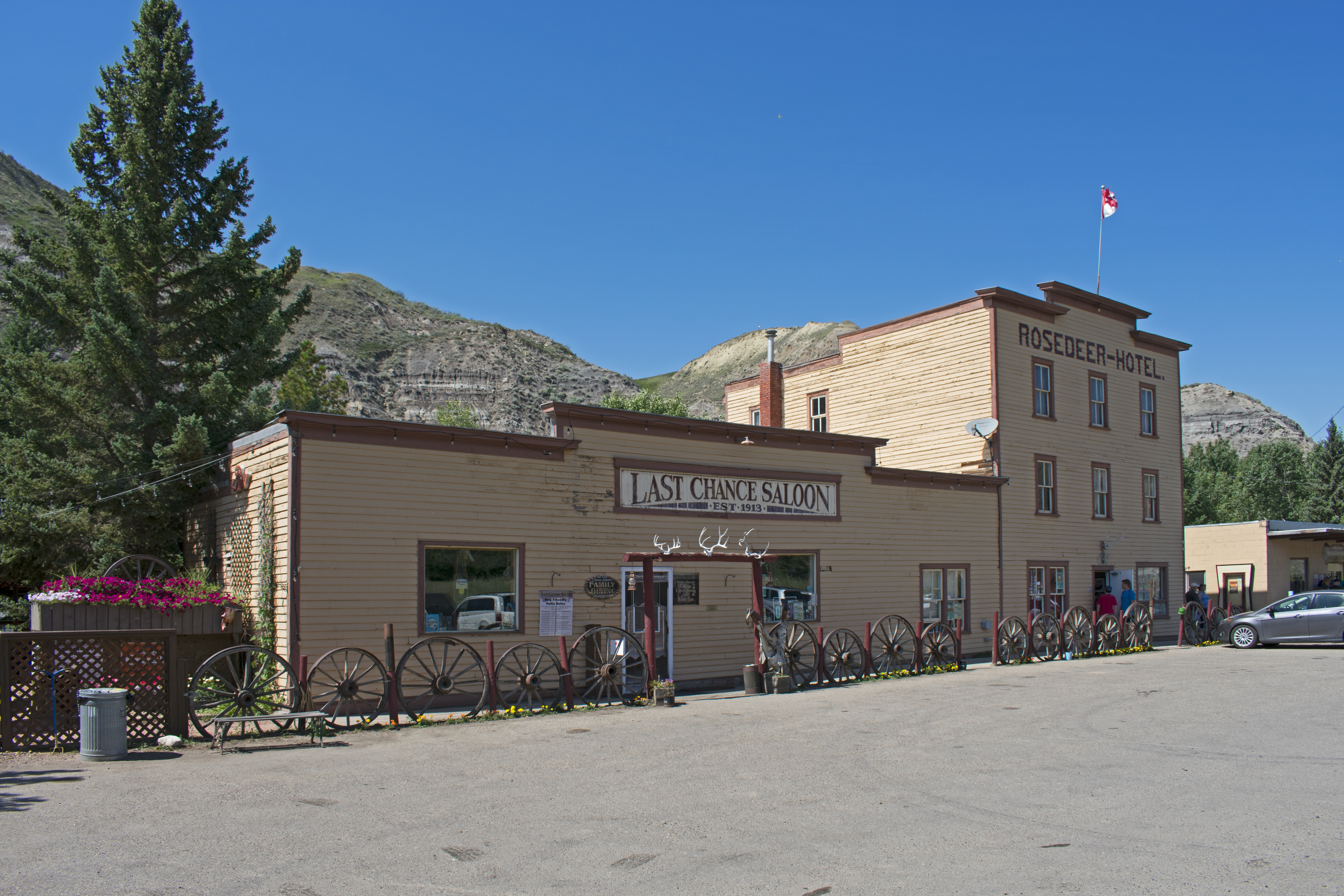
- Rosedeer Hotel in Wayne

- Location within Town of Drumheller Location within Alberta
- Coordinates: 51.382°N 112.660°W
- Country: Canada
- Province: Alberta
- Municipality: Town of Drumheller

Government
  - Mayor: Heather Colberg
  - Governing body: Drumheller Town Council: Lisa Hansen-Zacharuk; Patrick Kolafa; Tony Lacher; Stephanie Price; Crystal Sereda; Tom Zariski
- Elevation: 695 m (2,280 ft)
- Time zone: UTC−06:00 (Alberta Time)
- Area codes: 403, 587, 825

Wayne is a community within the Town of Drumheller, Alberta, Canada. It was previously a hamlet within the former Municipal District (MD) of Badlands No. 7 prior to the MD's amalgamation with the former City of Drumheller on January 1, 1998.

Wayne is located approximately 10 km (6.2 mi) southeast of Drumheller's main townsite and 104 km (65 mi) northeast of Calgary. It lies in the Rosebud River valley and has an elevation of 695 metres (2,280 ft). It is accessed via Highway 10X from Rosedale to the north through a 150-metre-deep (490 ft) canyon in the badlands, across eleven bridges that span the Rosebud River.

Wayne is within Census Division No. 5 and was in the federal riding of Crowfoot.

Population history of Wayne
Year	Pop.	±%
1941	601	—
1951	357	−40.6%
1956	255	−28.6%
1961	116	−54.5%
1966	93	−19.8%
1971	55	−40.9%
1981	40	−27.3%
1986	54	+35.0%
1991	43	−20.4%
Source: Statistics Canada

== Attractions ==
Wayne was the site of several coal mines that were closed in the 1950s. It is host to a few historic sites, including the Rosedeer Hotel.

== See also ==
- List of communities in Alberta
