= The Drumheller Mail =

Community newspaper in Alberta, Canada

- Type: Weekly newspaper
- Owner: Drumheller Mail Ltd.
- Founder: Grover Cleveland Duncan
- Publisher: Ossie Sheddy
- Managing editor: Bob Sheddy
- Founded: 1911
- City: Drumheller, Alberta
- Website: drumhellermail.com

The Drumheller Mail is a community newspaper in Alberta, Canada. Established in 1911, it is one of Alberta's oldest community newspapers.

== History ==
In 1911, The Mail was started by Grover Cleveland Duncan in Munson, Alberta. In April 1918, the printing plant was moved into Drumheller and amalgamated with the printing job plant of E.C. Payne. In September 1952, three Drumheller businessmen (John Anderson, Sam Robb, and Osborne Sheddy Sr.) purchased the newspaper from The Clarke Brothers. John was the accountant, Sam was the Pressman, and Ossie was the young Salesman and Manager of the operations. Over time, Ossie reinvested his share of the profits into purchasing more ownership in the company until he owned all shares in 1972. As of 2009 Drumheller Mail Ltd. is still owned by the Sheddy family and employs over 20 people. Ossie Sheddy Jr. and Osborne (Bob) Sheddy III run the business.

In 2000, the newspaper went online. The website has become Drumheller's longest running and most comprehensive news website.

In the past 100 years 15 newspapers have started in the area, and "The Drumheller Mail" has maintained the largest proven circulation. In 2011, the paper celebrated 100 years of publishing services in Alberta.

== See also ==
- List of newspapers in Canada
