= Dorothy, Alberta =

Dorothy
- Hamlet
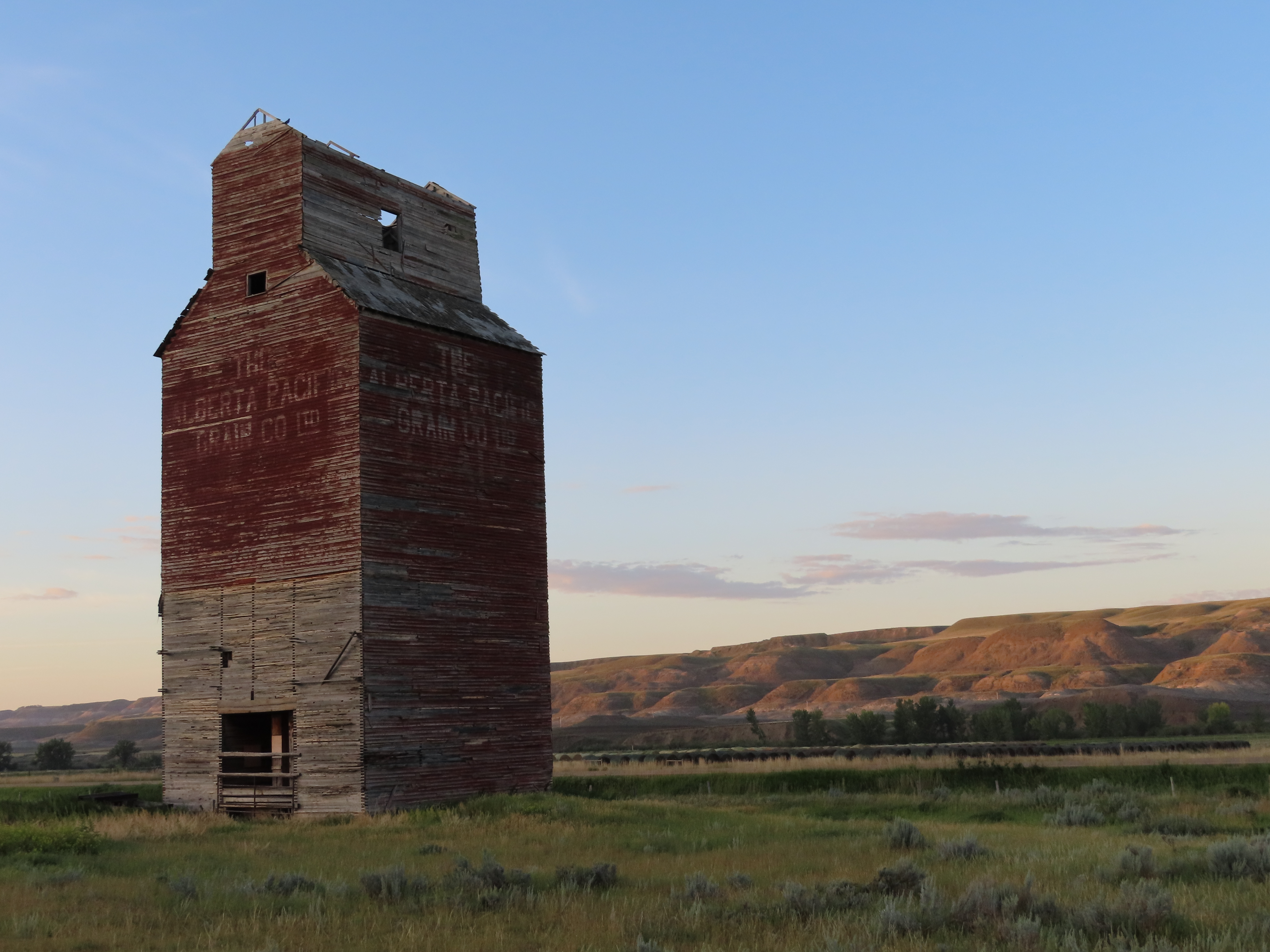
- Dorothy grain elevator at sunrise

- Location in Special Area No. 2 Location in Alberta
- Coordinates: 51°16′45″N 112°19′30″W
- Country: Canada
- Province: Alberta
- Planning region: Red Deer
- Special area: 2

Government
  - Type: Unincorporated
  - Governing body: Special Areas Board

Population (1991)
  - Total: 14
- Time zone: UTC−06:00 (Alberta Time)

Dorothy is a hamlet in southern Alberta, Canada within Special Area No. 2. It is located approximately 21 kilometres (13 mi) east of Highway 56 and 85 kilometres (53 mi) northwest of Brooks.

== Toponymy ==
Dorothy was named after the first white baby to be born in the district, Dorothy Wilson. Wilson was the daughter of Jack and Eliza Wilson, local ranchers.

== History ==
Dorothy began as a farming community around 1895. The settlement, which lies on the east bank of the Red Deer River, began to develop in 1906, following the introduction of ferry services. A ferry bridge was constructed in 1908 by the Dominion Bridge Company.

Around this time, John Percy McBeath established a homestead and general store in the area. He attempted to establish a post office for the locality named "Percyville," after his middle name, but the local postal inspector disapproved of McBeath and chose to name the locality after the daughter of local ranchers Jack and Eliza Wilson. The post office subsequently opened in February 1908 under the name Dorothy.

In the 1920s and 1930s, coal was discovered in the region at locations including the Atlas Mine. Dorothy reached its peak population of around 100 residents around this time.

Alberta Pacific Grain built a grain elevator in Dorothy in 1928, which was connected to rail services by the Canadian Pacific Railway. Two years later, members of the United Church purchased a farmhouse for $50 and converted it into a place of worship for their congregation. To fund the conversion, Dorothy's residents, particularly local women, held fundraisers and bake sales; Nellie McClung attended one such fundraiser in 1931. The first sermon at the completed church took place in 1932. A general store, the Mashon Bros. Store, opened in 1937, as did the Dorothy School.

In 1944 Catholic residents of Dorothy purchased a disused school building from a nearby settlement for $50, and converted into the Church of Our Lady of Perpetual Help.

Dorothy's grain elevator was decommissioned in 1951. The next year, the hamlet received national media attention when Richard Harrington reported on the quest of Dorothy local, Tom Hodgson, to find a wife. Harrington reported that the population of single women in Dorothy was dwarfed by its population of 20 bachelors. Lands around Dorothy were prospected for bentonite deposits in 1955, but samples were too poor to be commercially viable.

Dorothy's school closed in 1960. The next year Dorothy's United Church closed, and the Church of Our Lady of Perpetual Help closed in 1967.

Ferry services ended in Dorothy in 1975 when a permanent bridge was installed over the Red Deer River. Rail services to Dorothy ended in June 1977. The Mashon Bros. store closed in 1979, and Dorothy's post office closed in May 1991.

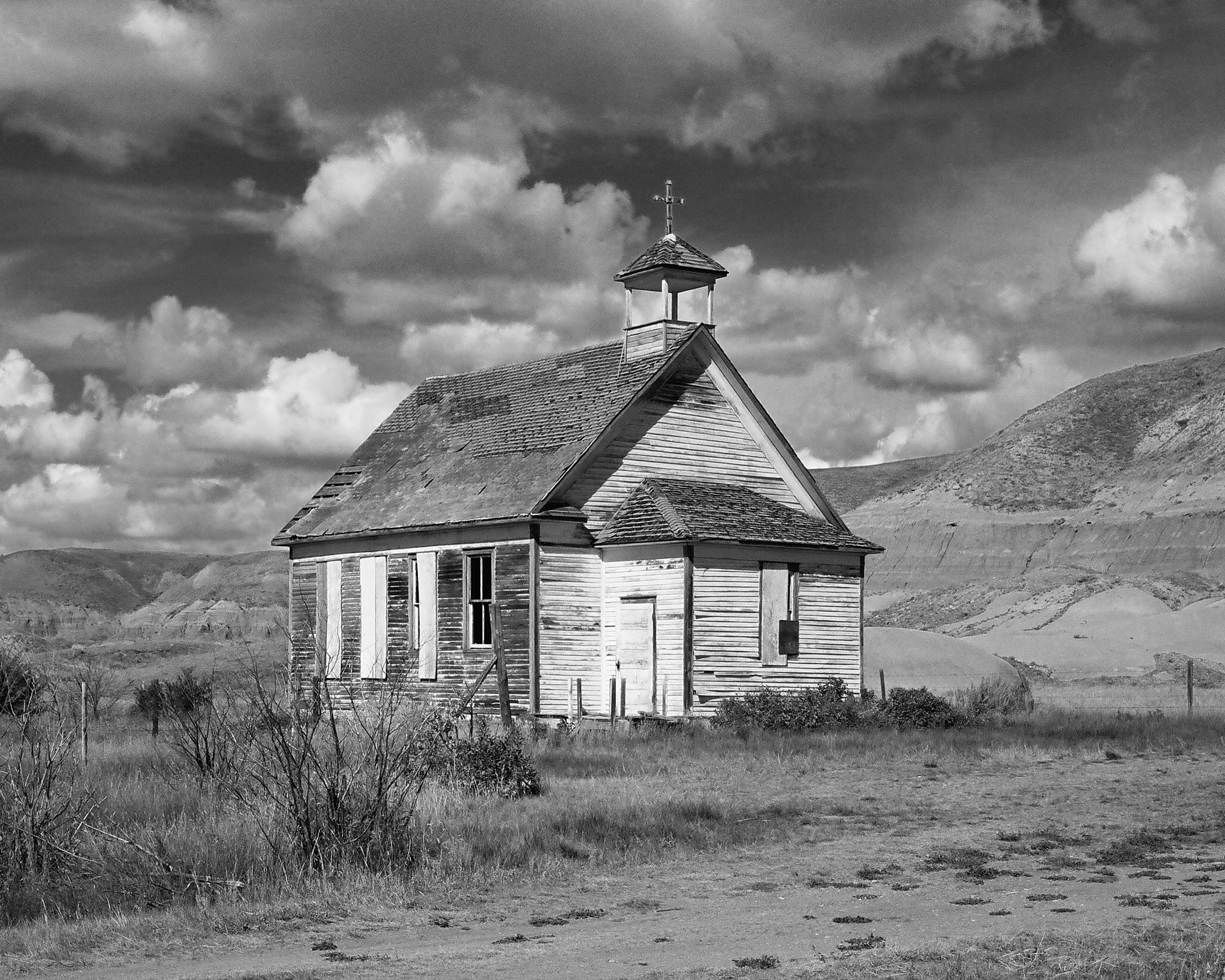
Catholic church located in Dorothy, Alberta

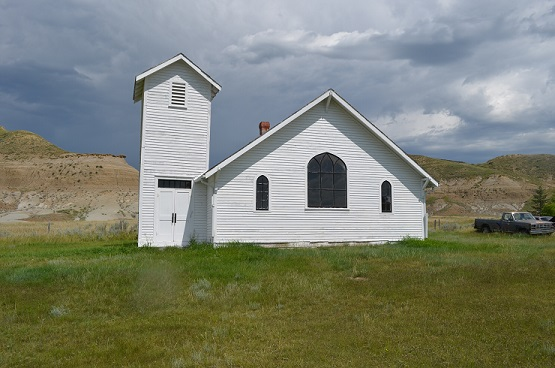
United Church located in Dorothy, Alberta

== Places of interest ==
Dorothy has attracted media and tourist attention for its status as a ghost town, although some of its remaining residents expressed a dislike of this term in 2013. Dorothy contains an active community association as of 2025.

=== Structures ===
As of the 2020s several abandoned buildings from busier periods in Dorothy's history remain standing, including the Mashon Bros. Store and Alberta Pacific Grain Elevator.

Dorothy's grain elevator underwent restoration as a site of historical interest in 2025.

== Demographics ==
Dorothy recorded a population of 14 in the 1991 Census of Population conducted by Statistics Canada.The Western Producer reported that Dorothy had a population of 10 in 2002, and in 2013, travel writer Glenn Cameron assessed Dorothy to have a population of 9.

== In popular culture ==
- Dorothy's APG grain elevator featured in the music video for Tom Cochrane's 1991 single, "Life Is a Highway."
- Part of the movie Ghostbusters 3: Afterlife (2021) was filmed in and around Dorothy.

== See also ==
- List of communities in Alberta
- List of hamlets in Alberta
