= Badlands Amphitheatre =

Event venue in Alberta

Coordinates: 51.4594°N 112.7465°W

The Badlands Amphitheatre (often referred to as the Badlands Amp) is a non-profit arts, culture, and tourism event venue in Drumheller, Alberta, Canada. The Badlands Amphitheatre takes its name from the original 2,500-seat open-air amphitheatre onsite that is situated in the heart of the Canadian Badlands. This natural amphitheatre is widely recognized as Canada's largest outdoor stage.

The grounds of the Badlands Amphitheatre span 400 acres (0.625 square miles, 1.62 square km). Onsite facilities include the Mainstage natural amphitheatre, the smaller 200-seat Forum Theatre, and the Badlands Arts Centre, which hosts The Studio Space (an indoor flexible performance space with digital projection walls), commercial and barbecue kitchens, and an indoor dining area.

Notable events produced and hosted by the Badlands Amphitheatre include the Badlands Passion Play, the Canadian Icons concert series, and the Roots, Blues & Barbecue festival.

The Badlands Amphitheatre is a registered Canadian nonprofit arts and culture society.

== History ==
Efforts to establish an open-air amphitheatre in the Canadian Badlands region for the purposes of producing a Passion Play began in 1991. In the early years of the Badlands Passion Play, audience members were asked to bring lawn chairs to performances; amphitheatre seating was subsequently built in 1994.

From 1994 to 2015, the Badlands Amphitheatre site was open to the general public for summer performances outdoors, then closed for the rest of the year. In 2015, the Badlands Amphitheatre began hosting outdoor concerts, starting with the inaugural Canadian Icons concert featuring Tom Cochrane. From 2015 on, more events were added, including the Roots, Blues & Barbecue festival, classical concerts, Badlands LightFest (fireworks and light installations), and the opera Carmen, which was the first full-length outdoor opera produced in Alberta. During this expansion, the Badlands Amphitheatre won two Alberta Tourism awards for marketing and collaboration.

In 2019, construction of the Badlands Arts Centre, a 1,310 square meter (14,100 square foot) indoor event space, was initiated. Construction of the Badlands Arts Centre was funded in part by the provincial and federal governments.

In 2020, the Badlands Amphitheatre, following provincial COVID-19 pandemic restrictions, cancelled the Badlands Passion Play for the first time in its 27-year history. Event cancellations led to a 99% drop in site visitors as compared to 2019. The site did not return to event operations until Summer 2022.

== Grounds ==
The Badlands Amphitheatre

The Badlands Amphitheatre is located off of South Dinosaur Trail in Drumheller, Alberta. The site's 400 acres are situated in the Canadian Badlands region, which is characterized by a distinctive geographic topology and is home to the largest deposit of dinosaur bones in the world.

Due to scenic and auditory similarities between the Badlands Amphitheatre and Red Rocks Amphitheatre in Colorado, USA, the Badlands Amphitheatre is sometimes referred to as Canada's Red Rocks.

== Facilities ==
The Mainstage of the Badlands Amphitheatre is a 2,500-seat outdoor amphitheatre. The stage area is six acres of performance space, and is widely recognized as Canada's largest outdoor stage.

The Forum Theatre is a smaller outdoor amphitheatre that seats 240.

The Badlands Arts Centre is a 1,310 square meter (14,100 square-foot) building with an additional 836 square meter (9,000 square feet) of dedicated outdoor space that allows indoor events to occur onsite. The Badlands Arts Centre houses the Studio Space, commercial and barbecue kitchens, and an indoor dining area.

The Studio Space in the Badlands Arts Centre is a 232 square meter (2,500 square foot) performance space that seats up to 200. The Studio Space has flexible seating configurations, a lighting catwalk, and a curved 270-degree digital projection wall that is approximately 30 meters (100 feet) long and 5 meters (16 feet) high.

== Notable Events ==
Notable events at the Badlands Amphitheatre include the Badlands Passion Play, the Canadian Icons concert series, and the Roots, Blues and Barbecue Festival.

=== Badlands Passion Play ===
Similar to Passion Plays performed worldwide, the Badlands Passion Play is an outdoor theatre performance that tells the story of the life of Christ. In 2022, the Badlands Passion Play celebrated its 27th season. It is the largest production of its kind in North America, involving up to 200 actors, theatre professionals, and volunteers. In some years the play has included live animals such as donkeys, horses, and doves, and live musicians.

The Badlands Passion Play is considered one of Alberta's top attractions. In 2014, the Badlands Passion Play was named one of the top 100 events in North America.

=== The Canadian Icons Concert Series ===
The Canadian Icons Concert Series hosts performances by prominent Canadian musicians. The series began in 2015 with Canadian musician Tom Cochrane. In subsequent years, Canadian musicians featured in the series included:

- Blue Rodeo
- Paul Brandt
- Randy Bachman
- Ian Tyson (opening act Corb Lund); Tyson subsequently cancelled due to poor health and Lund headlined
- Jann Arden (opening act Nuela Charles)
- Walk Off the Earth (opening act Static Shift)
- Barenaked Ladies (opening act The Velveteins)
- Johnny Reid
- The Dead South
