= Bankview, Alberta =

Bankview
- Former hamlet
- Location of Bankview in Alberta
- Coordinates: 51.458°N 112.710°W
- Country: Canada
- Province: Alberta
- Census division: No. 5
- Municipality: Town of Drumheller
- Annexed: 1964

Government
  - Mayor: Heather Colberg
  - Governing body: Drumheller Town Council: Lisa Hansen-Zacharuk; Patrick Kolafa; Tony Lacher; Stephanie Price; Crystal Sereda; Tom Zariski
- Time zone: UTC−06:00 (Alberta Time)
- Area codes: 403, 587, 825

Bankview is a community within the Town of Drumheller, Alberta, Canada. It was previously a hamlet within the former Municipal District of Badlands No. 7 (then Improvement District No. 7) prior to being annexed by Drumheller in 1964. The community is located within the Red Deer River valley to the south of Drumheller's main townsite across Highway 9 (South Railway Avenue).

Population history of Bankview
Year	Pop.	±%
1956	538	—
1961	327	−39.2%
Source: Statistics Canada

Population history of Bankview (1961-1966 including Newcastle)
Year	Pop.	±%
1961	1,276	—
1966	960	−24.8%
Source: Statistics Canada

== See also ==
- List of communities in Alberta
