= Rosebud River =

River in Alberta, Canada

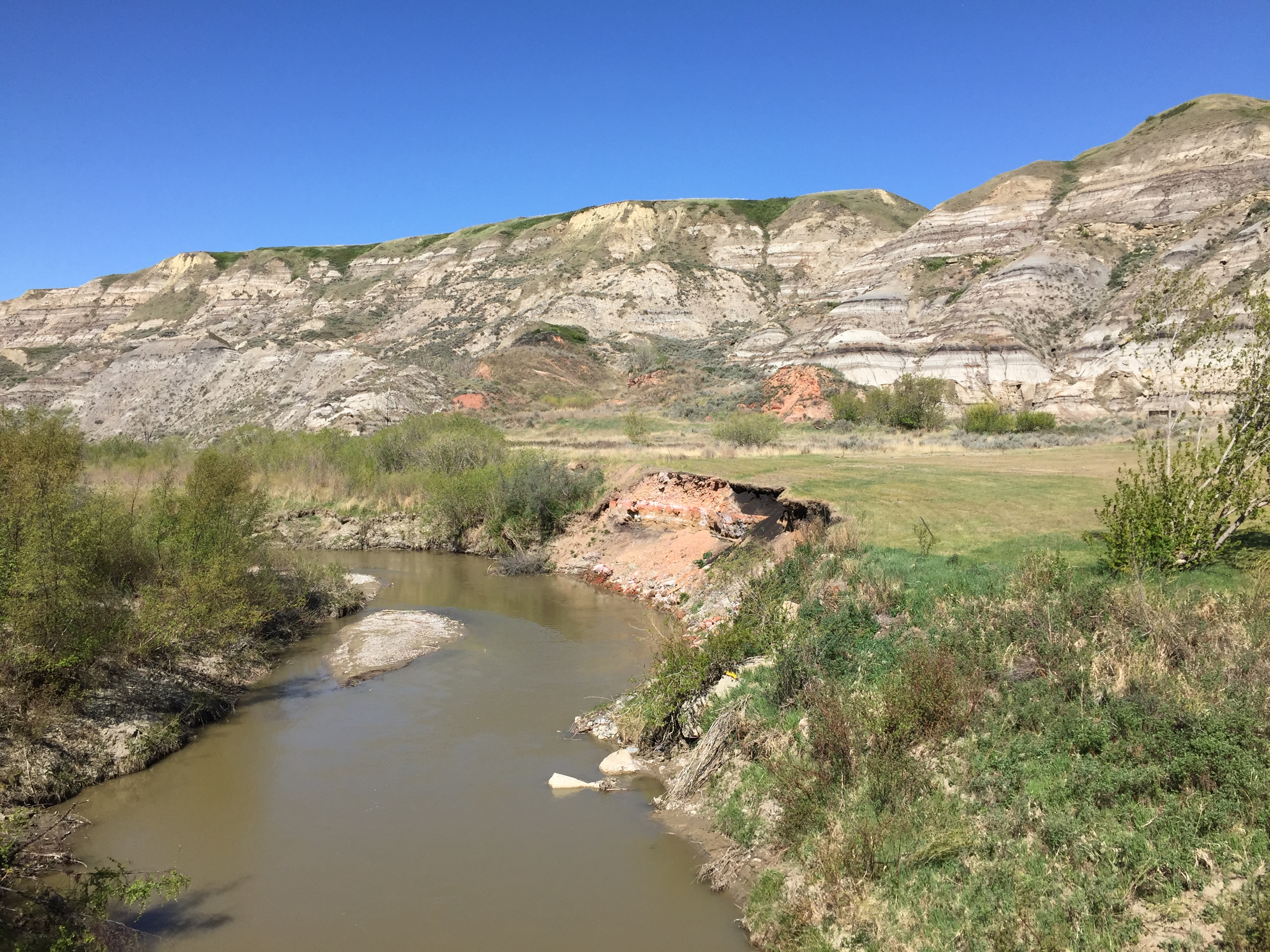
- Rosebud River near Wayne, Alberta

Location
- Country: Canada
- Province: Alberta

Physical characteristics
- Source
  - coordinates: 51.59329°N 114.18531°W
  - elevation: 1,095 meters (3,593 ft)
- Mouth
  - location: Red Deer River
  - coordinates: 51.42072°N 112.62979°W
  - elevation: 675 meters (2,215 ft)

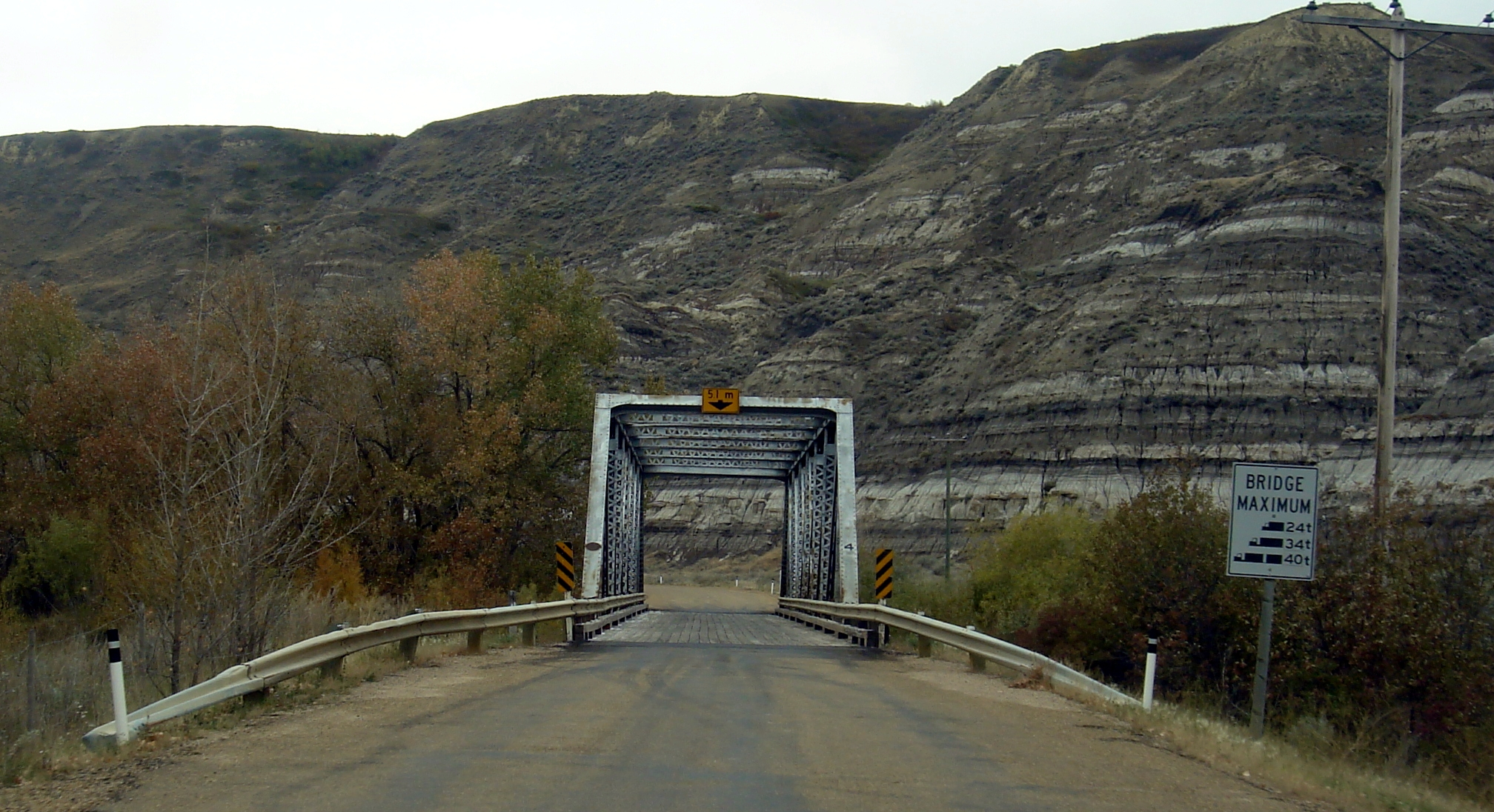
Highway 10X bridge over Rosebud River (one of 11)

The Rosebud River is a major tributary of the Red Deer River in Alberta, Canada. The Rosebud River passes through agricultural lands and ranchland for most of its course, and through badlands in its final reaches. It provides water for irrigation canals through a variety of dams built on its course and that of its tributaries.

The name is a translation of the Blackfoot word Akokiniskway, meaning "the river of many roses".

== Course ==
The Rosebud River originates in central Alberta, at an elevation of 1,095 meters (3,593 ft), southwest of Didsbury. It flows north and has a dam before it is crossed by Highway 582 and the Canadian Pacific Railway tracks. It receives the waters of Copeley Lake, then turns south through Didsbury, where it is crossed again by Highway 582 and Highway 2A. It then flows in a general south-eastern direction and is crossed by Highway 2 and Highway 581. It continues south-east and is crossed by Highway 72 and Highway 9 north of Irricana and south of Beiseker. It then continues eastwards and flows into southern Alberta, where it is crossed by Highway 21 and Highway 840 at the hamlet of Rosebud. The river then turns north-east, and its course is followed by the Canadian National Railway tracks as it is crossed by Highway 841. After reaching the hamlet of Wayne, it is also followed by Highway 10X through a badlands canyon that reaches 150 meters (490 ft) in depth. Eleven bridges cross the river back and forth through the badlands canyon. Rosebud River empties into the Red Deer River at Rosedale, at an elevation of 675 meters (2,215 ft).

== Tributaries and crossings ==
From origin to mouth, the Rosebud River receives the following tributaries or passes through these geographic features:

Tributary or feature	Location	Remarks
Origin	51.59329°N 114.18531°W	
Highway 582	51.66398°N 114.19809°W	Bridge
Canadian Pacific Railway	51.67174°N 114.21205°W	Bridge
Copeley Lake	51.74375°N 114.17283°W	Left tributary
Canadian Pacific Railway	51.69936°N 114.16173°W	Bridge
Highway 582	51.66302°N 114.11206°W	Bridge
Highway 2A	51.65771°N 114.09606°W	Bridge
Highway 2	51.59859°N 114.02530°W	tributary
Deadrick Creek	51.57823°N 113.96793°W	Left tributary
Highway 581	51.56153°N 113.95680°W	Bridge
Sheep Coulee	51.53070°N 113.93357°W	Right tributary
Highway 791	51.49082°N 113.82614°W	Bridge
Carstairs Creek	51.42627°N 113.74154°W	Right tributary
CN Rail	51.35297°N 113.58602°W	Bridge
Highway 9	51.34907°N 113.57265°W	Bridge
Crossfield Creek	51.33508°N 113.57053°W	Right tributary
Highway 21	51.31721°N 113.24361°W	Bridge
Atusis Creek	51.31321°N 113.05515°W	Left tributary
Serviceberry Creek	51.29105°N 113.01992°W	Right tributary
Redland	51.29173°N 113.01005°W	Flows by community
Rosebud	51.29950°N 112.95040°W	Flows by community
Severn Creek	51.29729°N 112.94908°W	Right tributary
Home Coulee	51.37890°N 112.65848°W	Right tributary
Wayne	51.38138°N 112.66042°W	Flows through community
Red Deer River	51.42072°N 112.62979°W	River mouth

== See also ==
- List of rivers of Alberta
