= Jeff Trembecky =

Canadian ice hockey and inline hockey player

- Born: October 19, 1974 (age 51) Drumheller, Alberta, Canada
- Height: 5 ft 11 in (180 cm)
- Weight: 182 lb (83 kg; 13 st 0 lb)
- Position: Centre
- Shot: Left
- Played for: ECHL; Peoria Rivermen; Pensacola Ice Pilots; Trenton Titans; Cincinnati Cyclones; Baton Rouge Kingfish; CHL; San Antonio Iguanas; BNL; Fife Flyers; Newcastle Vipers; Solihull MK Kings; Eredivisie; Tilburg Trappers
- NHL draft: Undrafted
- Playing career: 1998–2006

Jeff Trembecky (born October 19, 1974) is a Canadian former professional ice hockey and inline hockey player.

== Career ==
Trembecky attended the University of Alaska Fairbanks where he played three seasons (1995–1998) of NCAA hockey with the Alaska Nanooks, scoring 52 goals and 45 assists for 97 points, while earning 127 penalty minutes, in 114 games played.

Trembecky began his professional career in the ECHL, where he played the 1998–99 season with the Peoria Rivermen. He played the next season in the ECHL with both the Pensacola Ice Pilots and the Trenton Titans, before moving to the Central Hockey League for the 2000–01 season where he was a member of the San Antonio Iguanas. He returned to the ECHL for the 2001–02 to compete with both the Cincinnati Cyclones and Baton Rouge Kingfish to conclude his North American play.

During the 2002–03 season, Trembecky played in the British National League with the Fife Flyers, Newcastle Vipers, and Milton Keynes Kings.

During the 2003–04 season, Trembecky Tilburg Trappers' top playoffs goal scorer. He stayed with the Trappers for three seasons before retiring following the 2005–06 season.

== Personal life ==
Trembecky's father, Rick, played minor league hockey in Drumheller. His uncle, Bob Trembecky, spent several seasons with the Spokane Jets and Spokane Flyers. Jeff and his wife, Tammy, have two children. His son, Teydon, is a member of the Victoria Royals. In 2022, his daughter, Renna, was invited to training camp by the Seattle Thunderbirds.
