= Rosedale, Alberta =

Rosedale
- Former hamlet
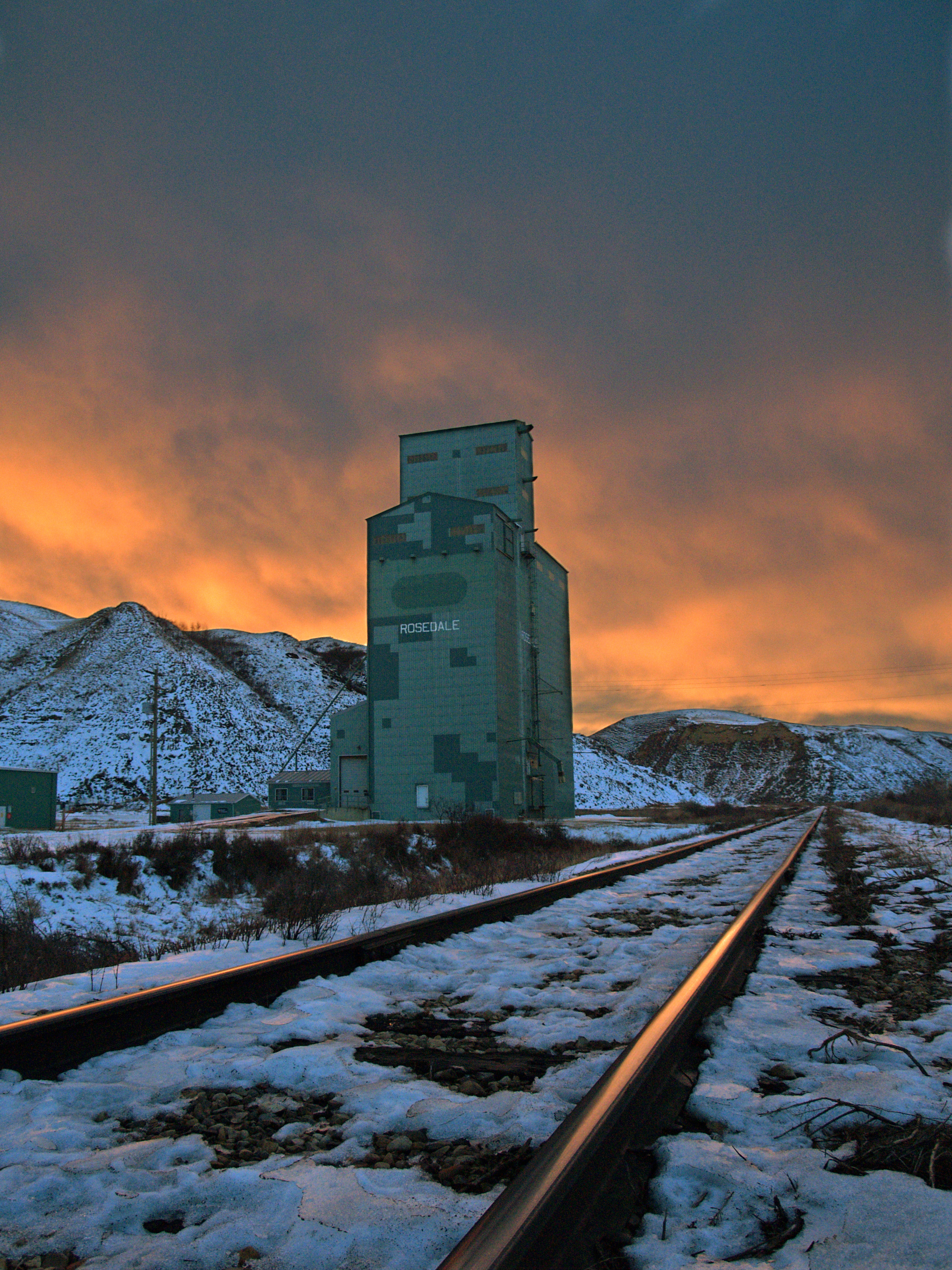
- Grain elevator and tracks in Rosedale

- Location within Town of Drumheller Location within Alberta
- Coordinates: 51.417°N 112.630°W
- Country: Canada
- Province: Alberta
- Municipality: Town of Drumheller

Government
  - Mayor: Heather Colberg
  - Governing body: Drumheller Town Council: Lisa Hansen-Zacharuk; Patrick Kolafa; Tony Lacher; Stephanie Price; Crystal Sereda; Tom Zariski

Area
  - Land: 1.94 km^{2} (0.75 sq mi)

Population (2016)
  - Total: 313
- Time zone: UTC−06:00 (Alberta Time)
- Area codes: 403, 587, 825

Rosedale is a community within the Town of Drumheller, Alberta, Canada. It was previously a hamlet within the former Municipal District (MD) of Badlands No. 7 prior to the MD's amalgamation with the former City of Drumheller on January 1, 1998. It is also recognized as a designated place by Statistics Canada.

Rosedale is at the intersection of Highway 10/Highway 56 and Highway 10X, approximately 8 km (5.0 mi) southeast of Drumheller's main townsite and 107 km (66 mi) northeast of Calgary. It lies at the confluence of the Red Deer River and the Rosebud River. The community is within Census Division No. 5 and in the federal riding of Crowfoot.

== Demographics ==
Population history of Rosedale
Year	Pop.	±%
1941	482	—
1951	663	+37.6%
1956	384	−42.1%
1961	301	−21.6%
1971	126	−58.1%
1981	167	+32.5%
1986	139	−16.8%
1991	220	+58.3%
1996	140	−36.4%
1996A	449	+220.7%
2001	327	−27.2%
2006	320	−2.1%
2011	335	+4.7%
2016	313	−6.6%
Source: Statistics Canada

As a designated place in the 2016 Census of Population conducted by Statistics Canada, Rosedale recorded a population of 313 living in 141 of its 152 total private dwellings, a change of −6.6% from its 2011 population of 335. With a land area of 1.94 km^{2} (0.75 sq mi), it had a population density of 161.3/km^{2} (417.9/sq mi) in 2016.

As a designated place in the 2011 Census, Rosedale had a population of 335 living in 140 of its 152 total dwellings, a 4.7% change from its 2006 population of 320. With a land area of 1.98 km^{2} (0.76 sq mi), it had a population density of 169.2/km^{2} (438.2/sq mi) in 2011.

== Attractions ==
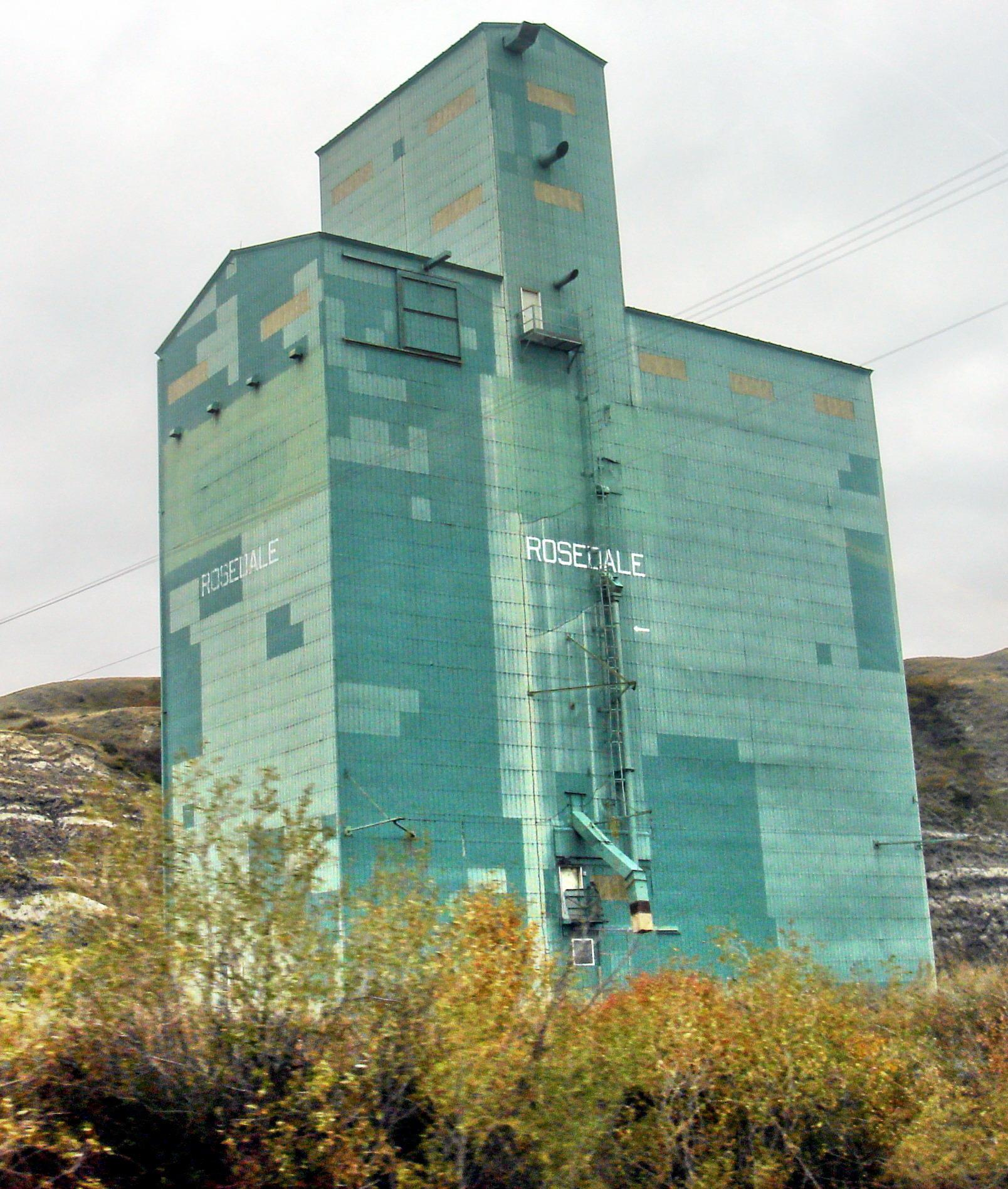
Rosedale grain elevator built by Alberta Wheat Pool

Rosedale was home to a variety of coal mines before their closure in the 1970s. The 117-metre-long (384 ft) Star Mine Suspension Bridge built in 1931 over the Red Deer River used to connect the settlement with coal mines established on the opposite side of the river. It was rebuilt in 1958, and now serves as a tourist attraction. A miner memorial is also in Rosedale near the town hall.

The Rosedale Bridge along Roper Rd allows for viewing of the Red Deer River, and a gravel road on the south-west side that goes under the bridge permits fishing.

== See also ==
- List of communities in Alberta
