= Midlandvale =

Midlandvale Midland
- Former hamlet
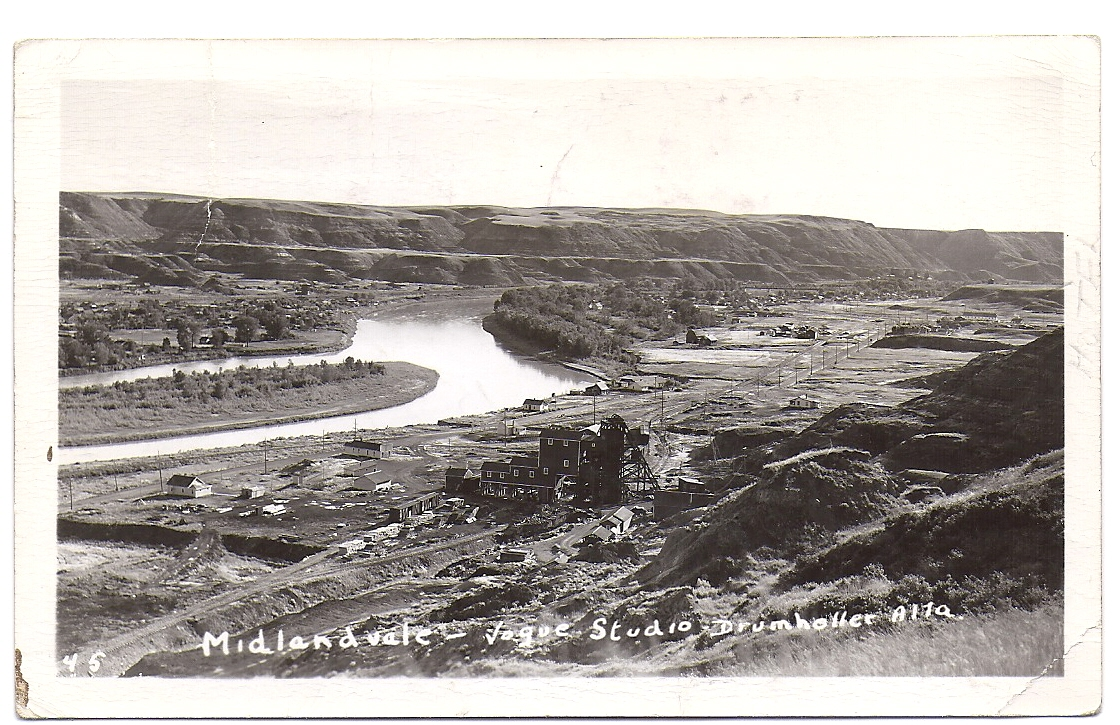
- Mining in the early days of Midlandvale

- Location of Midlandvale in Alberta
- Coordinates: 51.469°N 112.747°W
- Country: Canada
- Province: Alberta
- Census division: No. 5
- Municipality: Town of Drumheller
- Annexed: 1972

Government
  - Mayor: Heather Colberg
  - Governing body: Drumheller Town Council: Lisa Hansen-Zacharuk; Patrick Kolafa; Tony Lacher; Stephanie Price; Crystal Sereda; Tom Zariski
- Time zone: UTC−06:00 (Alberta Time)
- Area codes: 403, 587, 825

Midlandvale is a community within the Town of Drumheller, Alberta, Canada. It was previously a hamlet within the former Municipal District of Badlands No. 7 (then Improvement District No. 7) prior to being annexed by Drumheller in 1972. Now referred to as Midland by the Town of Drumheller, the community is located within the Red Deer River valley on North Dinosaur Trail (Highway 838), approximately 3 km (1.9 mi) west of Drumheller's main townsite.

== History ==
Population history of Midlandvale
Year	Pop.	±%
1956	536	—
1961	449	−16.2%
1966	431	−4.0%
1971	392	−9.0%
Source: Statistics Canada

Midlandvale once served as host to a community of mine workers from Midland No. 1, Midland No. 2, Western Gem and Brilliant Mines. The community's population was well over 600 people, and 400 worked in the mines. Midlandvale had a thriving community culture, featuring frequent games of baseball and soccer in the summer, and hockey in the winter. Sport was utilised by various members of the community to further their aims. Mine operators used sports games to promote their products, whilst unions believed that team sports promoted the ideal that a band of miners could fight for better working conditions than individual miners.

During the Spanish influenza epidemic of 1919–20, sufferers were isolated in areas such as the basement of the Drumheller -People's Bakery. In this particular isolation unit, only three of the eleven sufferers survived. It is known that the mines continued operation until the late 1950s, although the crippling Great Depression slowed trade. In one year during the 1930s, the coal mine at Midlandvale only operated for 52 days during the year.

== Today ==
Today, evidence of the sporting fields and hockey rinks that once stood are all now but gone. In 1974, the Midland Mining Company, through its president, Sidney McMullen, donated 595 hectares of land to the provincial government. The area has now been converted into a historical site, complete with trails and exhibits.

== See also ==
- List of communities in Alberta
