= Drumheller Municipal Airport =

- IATA: none; ICAO: none; TC LID: CEG4

Summary
- Airport type: Public
- Operator: Town of Drumheller
- Location: Starland County, near Drumheller, Alberta
- Time zone: Alberta Time (UTC−06:00)
- Elevation AMSL: 2,599 ft / 792 m
- Coordinates: 51°29′47″N 112°44′55″W
- Website: Drumheller Municipal Airport

Map
- Location in Alberta

Runways
Direction	Length		Surface
Direction	ft	m	Surface
17/35	3,505	1,068	Asphalt
- Source: Canada Flight Supplement

Drumheller Municipal Airport (TC LID: CEG4) is registered aerodrome located 3 nautical miles (5.6 km; 3.5 mi) northwest of Drumheller, Alberta. It was privately developed in 1962 and was purchased by the Town of Drumheller in 1968.

As a general aviation airport, the Drumheller Municipal Airport is dedicated to domestic use and does not have regularly scheduled passenger or cargo services. The airport provides services to government and commercial aircraft, and is the Town of Drumheller's general aviation gateway into Drumheller.

== History ==
From 1968 to 1972, the airport underwent improvements by the Alberta Department of Transport, which included improvements such as developing the turf runway into gravel, followed by the runway, apron, and taxiway being paved under the same arrangement in 1972.

In 1984, the terminal building was constructed and runway lighting units with navigation beacons were installed. This allowed the airport the opportunity to provide operations 24 hours a day, 7 days a week. Throughout this period of development, the airport also supported a variety of services, including ValAir, a charter passenger service, commercial crop sprayers, and parachute clubs.

== Current practices ==
As of 2021, airport manager Patrick Bonneville aims to provide a selection of beneficial aviation practices. Drumheller Municipal Airport includes an automated aviation weather system, fuel sales offered 24/7, an arrival and departure lounge, a canteen, hangar rentals, multiple classrooms, and GPS instrument approaches for landing and adverse weather. All of these practices aided in the creation and management of the many services run out of the airport.

Airport activities encompassing those within the Drumheller Municipal Airport itself, as well as those in the surrounding area, include commercial crop spraying, aerial infrared energy surveying, Shock Trauma Air Rescue Service (STARS) medevac flights, an area for flights associated with federal and provincial governmental operations, and supporting over 1,000 private-aircraft landings.

== See also ==
- Drumheller/Ostergard's Airport
