= Drumheller =

- Town
- Town of Drumheller
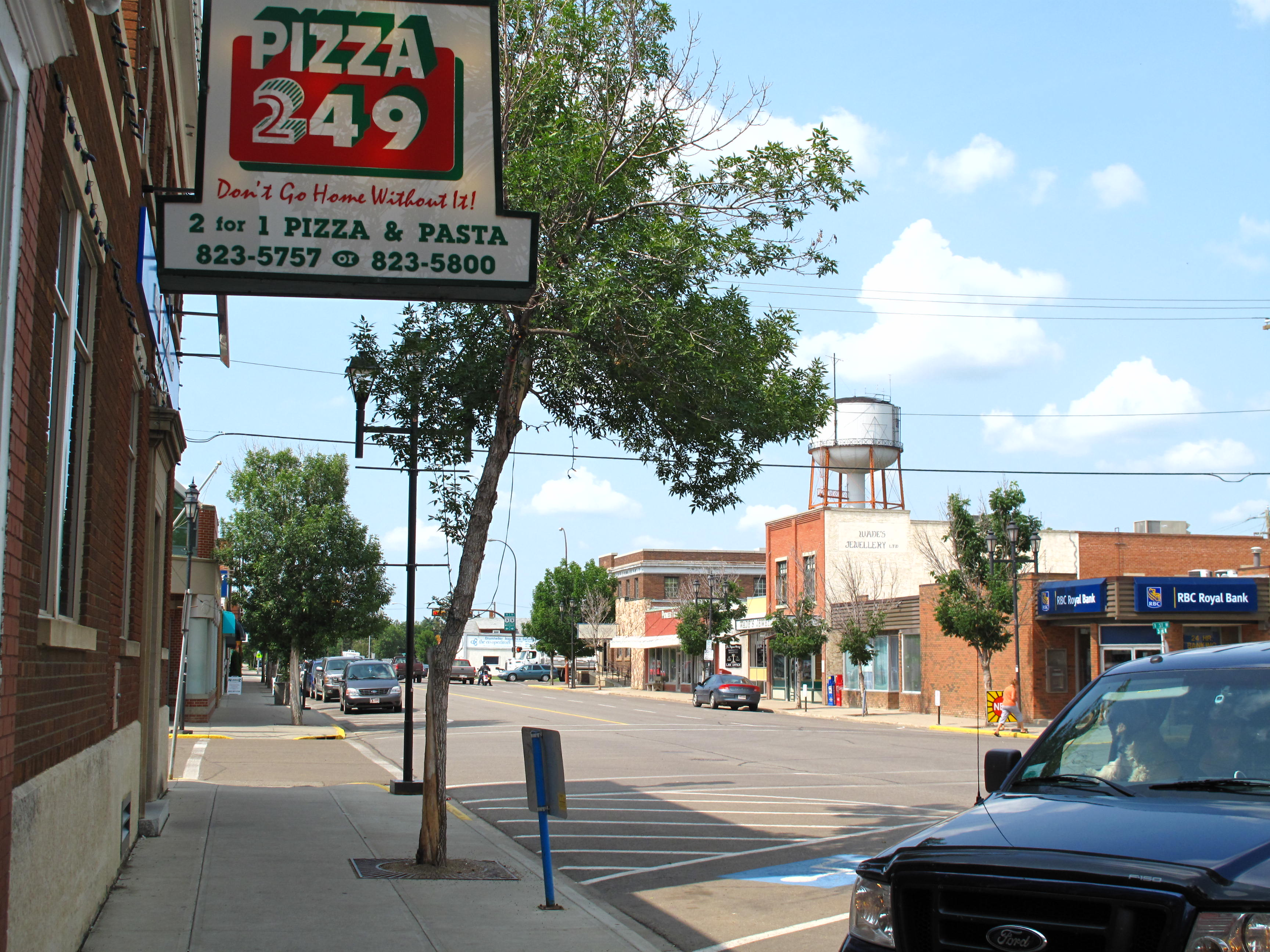
- Downtown Drumheller

- Flag
- Nickname: Dinosaur Capital of the World
- Location within Alberta
- Coordinates: 51°27′49″N 112°43′10″W
- Country: Canada
- Province: Alberta
- Region: Southern Alberta
- Census division: 5
- Adjacent municipal districts: Kneehill County, Starland County and Wheatland County
- Adjacent special area: Special Area No. 2
- Founded: 1911
- Incorporated
  - Village: 15 May 1913
  - Town: 2 March 1916
  - City: 3 April 1930
  - Town: 1 January 1998
- Amalgamated: 1 January 1998

Government
  - Mayor: Tony Miglecz
  - MP: Pierre Poilievre (Battle River—Crowfoot)
  - MLA: Nate Horner (Drumheller-Stettler)

Area (2021)
  - Land: 107.56 km^{2} (41.53 sq mi)
- Elevation: 670 m (2,200 ft)

Population (2021)
  - Total: 7,909
  - Density: 73.5/km^{2} (190/sq mi)
- Time zone: UTC−06:00 (Alberta Time)
- Forward sortation area: T0J
- Area codes: +1-403, +1-587
- Website: www.drumheller.ca

Drumheller (/drʌmˈhɛlər/) is a town on the Red Deer River in the badlands of east-central Alberta, Canada. It is located 110 kilometres (68 mi) northeast of Calgary and 97 kilometres (60 mi) south of Stettler. The Drumheller portion of the Red Deer River valley, often referred to as Dinosaur Valley, has an approximate width of 2 kilometres (1.2 mi) and an approximate length of 28 kilometres (17 mi).

Drumheller was named after Samuel Drumheller, who, after purchasing the homestead of Thomas Patrick Greentree, had it surveyed into the original Drumheller townsite and put lots on the market in 1911. Also in 1911, Samuel Drumheller started coal mining operations near the townsite.

Drumheller got a railway station in 1912. It was then incorporated as a village on 15 May 1913, a town on 2 March 1916, and a city on 3 April 1930. Over a 15-year period, Drumheller's population increased 857% from 312 in 1916 to 2,987 in 1931 shortly after becoming a city.

Drumheller boomed until the end of the Second World War when coal lost most of its value.

The City of Drumheller amalgamated with the Municipal District of Badlands No. 7 on 1 January 1998, to form the current Town of Drumheller. Some of the reasons the two municipalities amalgamated included Badlands No. 7 having more in common with Drumheller than other surrounding rural municipalities and both were experiencing similar planning and development issues due to their locations within the Red Deer River valley. The amalgamated municipality opted for town status rather than city status so that highways within would remain the responsibility of the Province of Alberta. As a result of the amalgamation, Drumheller became Alberta's largest town in terms of land area at 107.93 square kilometres (41.67 sq mi).

The 1998 amalgamation resulted in Drumheller absorbing six hamlets that were previously under the jurisdiction of the Municipal District of Badlands No. 7—Cambria, East Coulee, Lehigh, Nacmine, Rosedale and Wayne. Drumheller also previously absorbed the hamlets of Bankview, Midlandvale (Midland), Newcastle and North Drumheller during annexations while under city status. Bankview and Midland were annexed in 1964 and 1972 respectively, while Newcastle and North Drumheller were both annexed in 1967. Other localities within Drumheller, either absorbed through past annexations or its eventual amalgamation with Badlands No. 7, include Aerial, Eladesor, Kneehill, Rosedale Station, Western Monarch (Atlas) and Willow Creek.

In total, Drumheller has absorbed at least 13 other communities in its history, some of which are now recognized as neighbourhoods or districts within the town.

== Geography ==
=== Climate ===
Drumheller experiences a semi-arid climate (BSk) with very cold winters and hot summers. The highest temperature ever recorded in Drumheller was 39.4 °C (103 °F) on 10 August 2018. The coldest temperature ever recorded was −43.9 °C (−47 °F) on 29 January 1996.

Climate data for Drumheller, Alberta, 1991−2020 normals, extremes 1923−present
Month	Jan	Feb	Mar	Apr	May	Jun	Jul	Aug	Sep	Oct	Nov	Dec	Year
Record high humidex	14.5	14.6	27.6	29.2	33.3	41.8	40.8	39.9	34.8	29.6	25.9	17.1	41.8
Record high °C (°F)	15.5 (59.9)	15.1 (59.2)	28.0 (82.4)	29.8 (85.6)	33.8 (92.8)	36.8 (98.2)	38.7 (101.7)	39.4 (102.9)	35.4 (95.7)	30.0 (86.0)	25.9 (78.6)	17.3 (63.1)	39.4 (102.9)
Mean daily maximum °C (°F)	−4.9 (23.2)	−1.7 (28.9)	4.0 (39.2)	12.6 (54.7)	18.9 (66.0)	22.5 (72.5)	26.3 (79.3)	25.9 (78.6)	20.5 (68.9)	12.6 (54.7)	2.6 (36.7)	−4.0 (24.8)	11.3 (52.3)
Daily mean °C (°F)	−11.2 (11.8)	−8.7 (16.3)	−2.7 (27.1)	5.5 (41.9)	11.7 (53.1)	15.8 (60.4)	19.0 (66.2)	18.2 (64.8)	12.7 (54.9)	5.8 (42.4)	−3.4 (25.9)	−10.2 (13.6)	4.4 (39.9)
Mean daily minimum °C (°F)	−17.6 (0.3)	−15.7 (3.7)	−9.3 (15.3)	−1.6 (29.1)	4.4 (39.9)	9.1 (48.4)	11.6 (52.9)	10.3 (50.5)	4.9 (40.8)	−1.6 (29.1)	−9.5 (14.9)	−16.3 (2.7)	−2.6 (27.3)
Record low °C (°F)	−43.9 (−47.0)	−41.4 (−42.5)	−38.7 (−37.7)	−23.6 (−10.5)	−7.8 (18.0)	−0.7 (30.7)	2.5 (36.5)	1.6 (34.9)	−6.1 (21.0)	−17.1 (1.2)	−35.1 (−31.2)	−42.5 (−44.5)	−43.9 (−47.0)
Record low wind chill	−50.6	−46.7	−47.2	−28.1	−12.3	−3.0	—	—	−10.4	−23.1	−41.8	−50.4	−50.6
Average precipitation mm (inches)	12.3 (0.48)	10.2 (0.40)	15.0 (0.59)	25.7 (1.01)	47.7 (1.88)	69.3 (2.73)	64.4 (2.54)	51.4 (2.02)	41.2 (1.62)	13.4 (0.53)	11.2 (0.44)	10.4 (0.41)	372.1 (14.65)
Average rainfall mm (inches)	0.0 (0.0)	0.1 (0.00)	1.5 (0.06)	20.5 (0.81)	43.6 (1.72)	69.3 (2.73)	64.4 (2.54)	51.0 (2.01)	40.5 (1.59)	9.7 (0.38)	1.1 (0.04)	0.0 (0.0)	301.7 (11.88)
Average snowfall cm (inches)	12.2 (4.8)	10.1 (4.0)	13.5 (5.3)	5.2 (2.0)	4.0 (1.6)	0.0 (0.0)	0.0 (0.0)	0.4 (0.2)	0.7 (0.3)	3.8 (1.5)	10.1 (4.0)	10.4 (4.1)	70.5 (27.8)
Average precipitation days (≥ 0.2 mm)	3.8	3.0	3.7	4.7	7.2	9.1	8.4	6.6	6.2	3.6	3.5	3.2	63.1
Average rainy days (≥ 0.2 mm)	0.04	0.04	0.26	3.9	6.9	9.1	8.4	6.5	6.2	2.4	0.22	0.0	43.9
Average snowy days (≥ 0.2 cm)	3.8	3.0	3.5	1.3	0.65	0.0	0.0	0.08	0.12	1.2	3.3	3.2	20.2
Average relative humidity (%) (at 15:00 LST)	65.3	59.7	52.0	38.7	35.5	42.1	40.2	68.5	68.4	44.2	60.5	66.6	48.5
Source: Environment Canada (precipitation, rain, snow 1981−2010)

== Demographics ==
Population history of Drumheller (pre-1998 boundaries)
Year	Pop.	±%
1916	312	—
1921	2,499	+701.0%
1926	2,578	+3.2%
1931	2,987	+15.9%
1936	2,912	−2.5%
1941	2,748	−5.6%
1946	2,659	−3.2%
1951	2,601	−2.2%
1956	2,632	+1.2%
1961	2,931	+11.4%
1966	3,574	+21.9%
1971	5,446	+52.4%
1976	6,154	+13.0%
1981	6,528	+6.1%
1986	6,366	−2.5%
1991	6,277	−1.4%
1996	6,587	+4.9%
2001	6,503	−1.3%
Percent changes for 1966, 1971, and 1976 are inflated due to intercensal municipal boundary adjustments including the annexation of Bankview in 1964, Newcastle and North Drumheller in 1967, and Midlandvale in 1972. Source: Statistics Canada

Population history of the Town of Drumheller (current boundary)
Year	Pop.	±%
1956	8,134	—
1961	7,401	−9.0%
1966	6,977	−5.7%
1971	7,306	+4.7%
1976	7,420	+1.6%
1981	7,791	+5.0%
1986	7,511	−3.6%
1991	7,468	−0.6%
1996	7,833	+4.9%
2001	7,785	−0.6%
2006	7,932	+1.9%
2011	8,029	+1.2%
2016	7,982	−0.6%
Source: Statistics Canada

In the 2021 Census of Population conducted by Statistics Canada, the Town of Drumheller had a population of 7,909 living in 3,198 of its 3,557 total private dwellings, a change of −0.9% from its 2016 population of 7,982. With a land area of 107.56 km^{2} (41.53 sq mi), it had a population density of 73.5/km^{2} (190.4/sq mi) in 2021.

In the 2016 Census of Population conducted by Statistics Canada, the Town of Drumheller recorded a population of 7,982 living in 3,164 of its 3,471 total private dwellings, a −0.6% change from its 2011 population of 8,029. With a land area of 108.03 km^{2} (41.71 sq mi), it had a population density of 73.9/km^{2} (191.4/sq mi) in 2016.

== Economy ==
Drumheller was once the largest coal producing city in Western Canada, with the Atlas Coal Mine. Now, coal mining has been replaced by natural gas and oil. Drumheller has Alberta's second largest natural gas field, the West Drumheller Field. However, Drumheller is planning to transition away from fossil fuels and emphasize renewable energy sources, such as wind power, in its economy.

Currently, tourism is Drumheller's main industry. A federal prison and regional medical complex also contribute to the economy. Agriculture is also quite important.

== Attractions ==
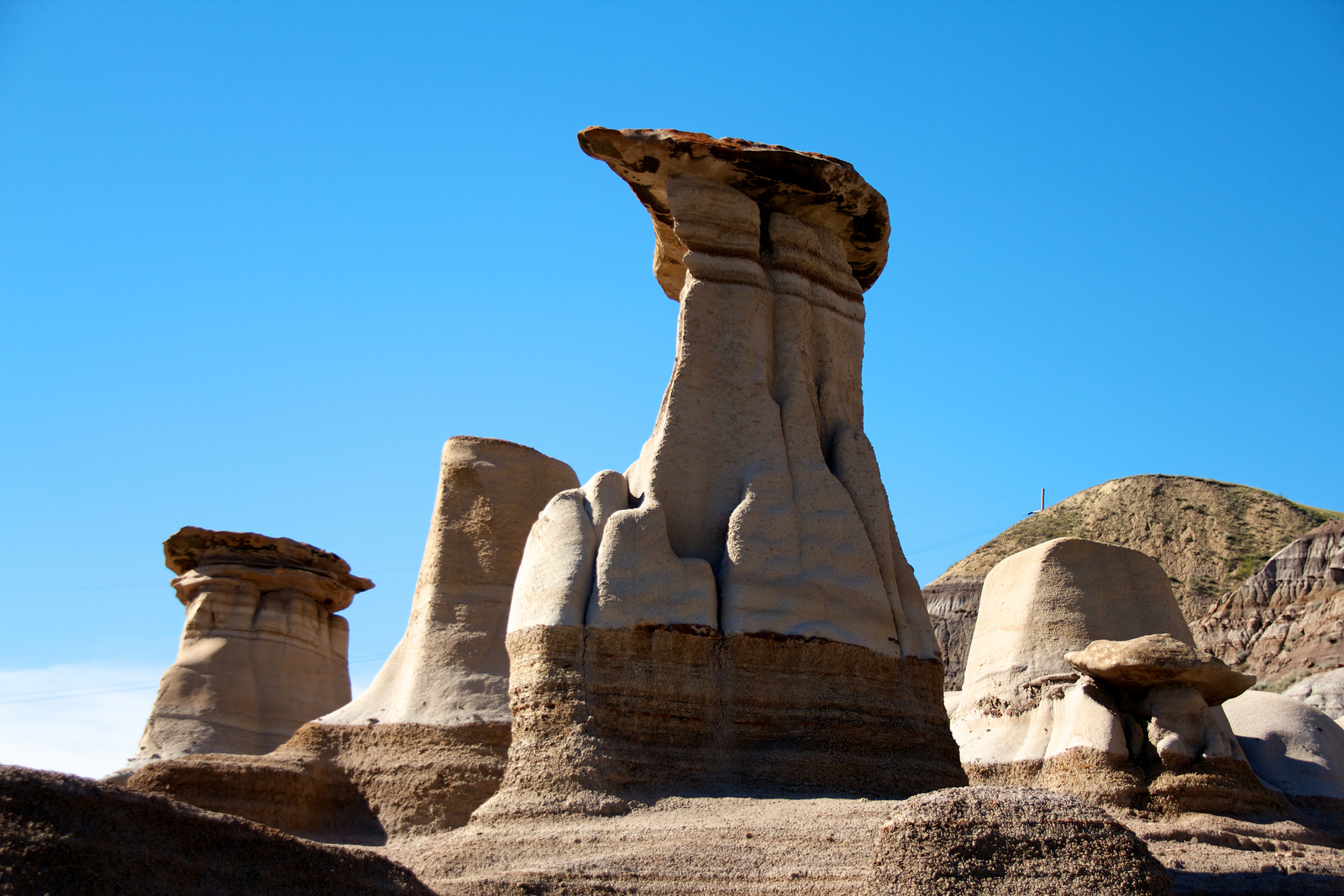
Hoodoos at Drumheller

South of the traffic bridge over the Red Deer river on Highway 9 is the World's Largest Dinosaur, a 26.2-metre (86 ft) high fiberglass Tyrannosaurus rex that can be entered for a view of the Badlands, including the adjacent 23 metre (75 ft) water fountain, again one of the largest in Canada. It was announced in March 2025 that the dinosaur will close in December 2029 at the end of the current lease term.

Tourist attractions also include the Star Mine Suspension Bridge, Atlas Coal Mine, Canadian Badlands Passion Play, Horseshoe Canyon, Rotary Spray Park, Aquaplex (with indoor and outdoor pools), Horse Thief Canyon, Hoodoos, Midland Provincial Park, the Rosedeer Hotel in Wayne, 27 kilometres (17 mi) of constructed pathways, Bleriot Ferry, East Coulee School Museum, the Homestead Museum, Barney's Adventure Park, and the Little Church, which is capable of seating only six patrons.

Next to the now-closed Drumheller ski hill is the Canadian Badlands Passion Play site where performances are held for two weeks each July. The Badlands Amphitheatre began hosting the Passion Play in 1991. Companies are composed of actors from all over Alberta. The site also offers small plays throughout the summer and an interpretive centre.

Drumheller was also home to the Valley Doll Museum and Gifts, where it displayed over 700 dolls.

=== Royal Tyrrell Museum of Palaeontology ===
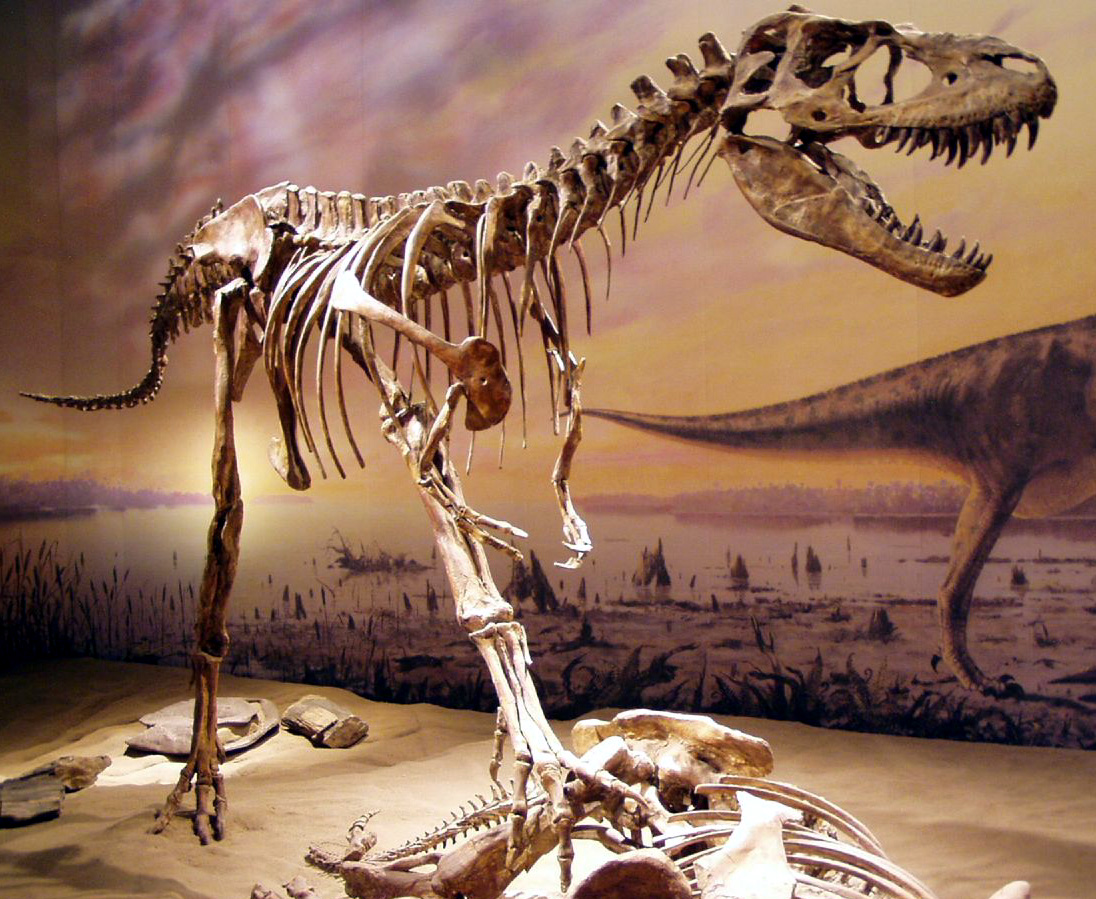
Gorgosaurus at Royal Tyrrell Museum

The Royal Tyrrell Museum of Palaeontology is a museum that hosts Canada's largest collection of dinosaur fossils. It boasts 500,000 visitors a year, the largest of all provincial museum attractions. It opened on 25 September 1985. The museum is located in the northwest quadrant of the Town of Drumheller, in Midland Provincial Park and is operated by the Government of Alberta under the Ministry of Arts, Culture and Status of Women.

== Media ==
=== Digital ===
DrumhellerOnline.com is Drumheller's local news portal.

=== Radio ===
- Boom 99.5: CHOO-FM, Classic hits (Rock)
- FM 94.5: CHTR-FM, tourist information
- New Country 92.5: CKDQ-FM, country music
- FM 91.3: CKUA-FM-13, public broadcasting (relay)

=== Newspapers ===
Newspapers covering Drumheller include the weekly Drumheller Mail, which has been publishing every Wednesday since 1911 and has been owned by the Sheddy family since 1954.

=== Television ===
All stations are analogue relays of stations from Calgary.

- Channel 8: CICT-TV-1 (Global)
- Channel 10: CFCN-TV-6 (CTV) (city grade)
- Channel 12: CFCN-TV-1 (CTV) (from Delia)

== Transportation ==
Drumheller/Ostergard's Airport and Drumheller Municipal Airport are in the vicinity of Drumheller. None have regular passenger flights.

Passenger rail service ran from 1912 up until 1981 but freight continued on the through lines up until 2014.

The railway was decommissioned and demolished in 2014, and replaced by the Rails To Trails project to allow for better pedestrian travel throughout the valley.

== Notable people ==
- Tommy Anderson (1910–1971), ice hockey player
- Jaydee Bixby (born 1990), country musician
- Andrew Bodnarchuk (born 1988), ice hockey player
- Don Campbell (1925–2012), ice hockey player
- John Murray Campbell (1931–2021), politician
- Bob Comfort (1940–2010), screenwriter and producer
- Philip J. Currie (born 1949), palaeontologist and museum curator
- Bruno De Costa (born 1938), skeet shooter
- Jack Evans (1928–1996), ice hockey player
- Glen Gorbous (1930-1990), baseball player
- Glenn Gray (1924–2011), curler
- Glenn Hagel (born 1949), politician
- Doug MacAuley (1929–2009), ice hockey player
- Jackie Pement (born 1946), politician
- Karen Robinson (born 1968), actress, including member of cast of Schitt's Creek
- Howard E. Ross (1921–2010), land developer and builder
- Frank Sandercock (1887–1942), ice hockey administrator
- Stanley Schumacher (1933-2020), politician and lawyer
- Tom Siddon (born 1941), politician and aerospace engineer
- Darren Tanke (born 1960), palaeontologist and museum curator
- Jeff Trembecky (born 1974), ice hockey player

== See also ==
- List of communities in Alberta
- List of towns in Alberta
