= East Coulee, Alberta =

East Coulee
- Former hamlet
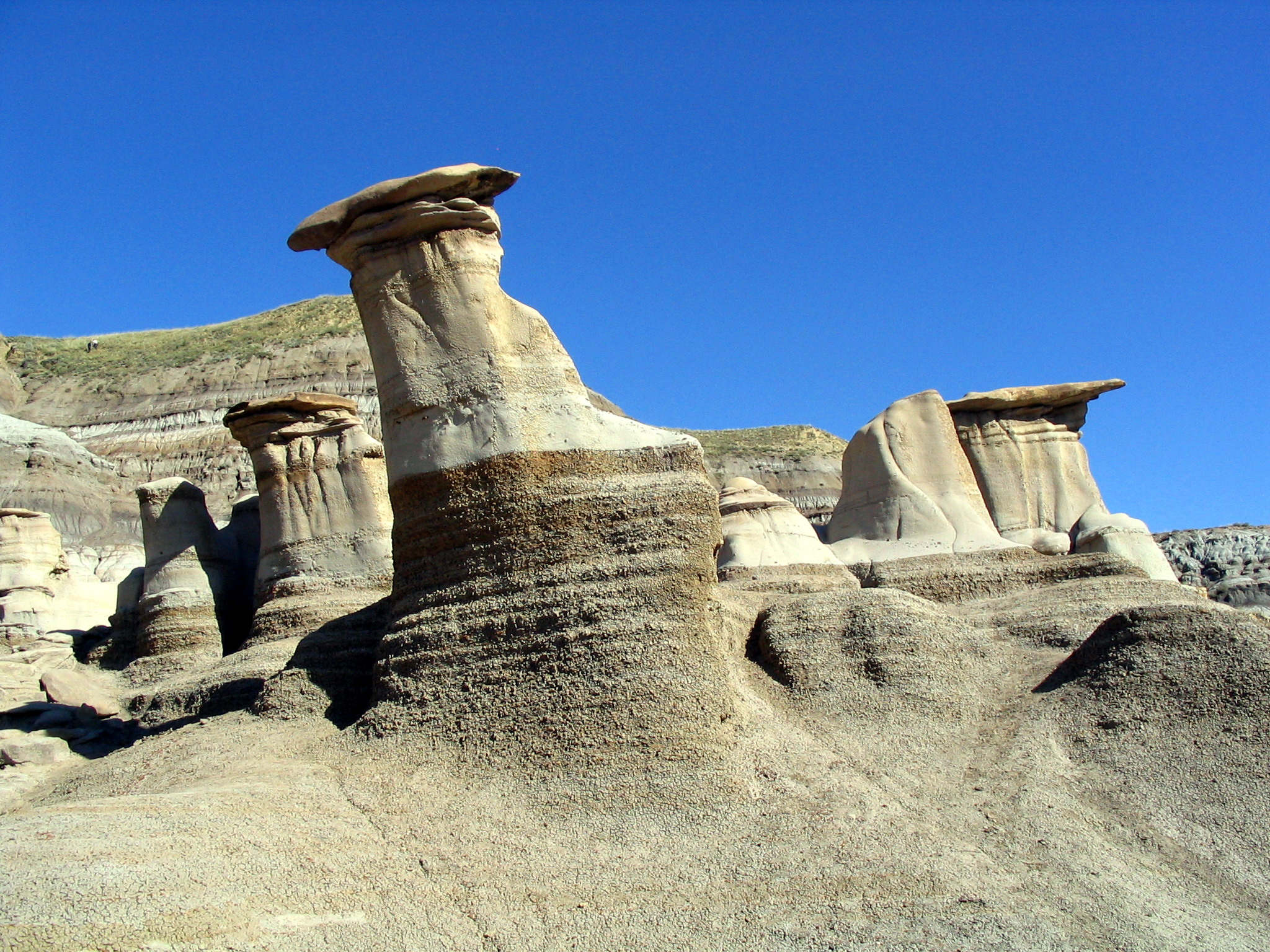
- Hoodoos near East Coulee

- Location within Town of Drumheller Location within Alberta
- Coordinates: 51.336°N 112.490°W
- Country: Canada
- Province: Alberta
- Municipality: Town of Drumheller

Government
  - Mayor: Heather Colberg
  - Governing body: Drumheller Town Council: Lisa Hansen-Zacharuk; Patrick Kolafa; Tony Lacher; Stephanie Price; Crystal Sereda; Tom Zariski

Area
  - Land: 1.39 km^{2} (0.54 sq mi)
- Elevation: 675 m (2,215 ft)

Population (2016)
  - Total: 148
- Time zone: UTC−06:00 (Alberta Time)
- Area codes: 403, 587, 825

East Coulee is a community within the Town of Drumheller, Alberta, Canada. It was previously a hamlet within the former Municipal District (MD) of Badlands No. 7 prior to the MD's amalgamation with the former City of Drumheller on January 1, 1998. It is also recognized as a designated place by Statistics Canada.

East Coulee is located on Highway 10, approximately 20 km (12 mi) southeast of Drumheller's main townsite and 112 km (70 mi) northeast of Calgary. It lies in the Red Deer River valley and has an elevation of 675 m (2,215 ft). The community is within Census Division No. 5 and in the federal riding of Crowfoot.

It was one of the filming locations of the television series MythQuest.

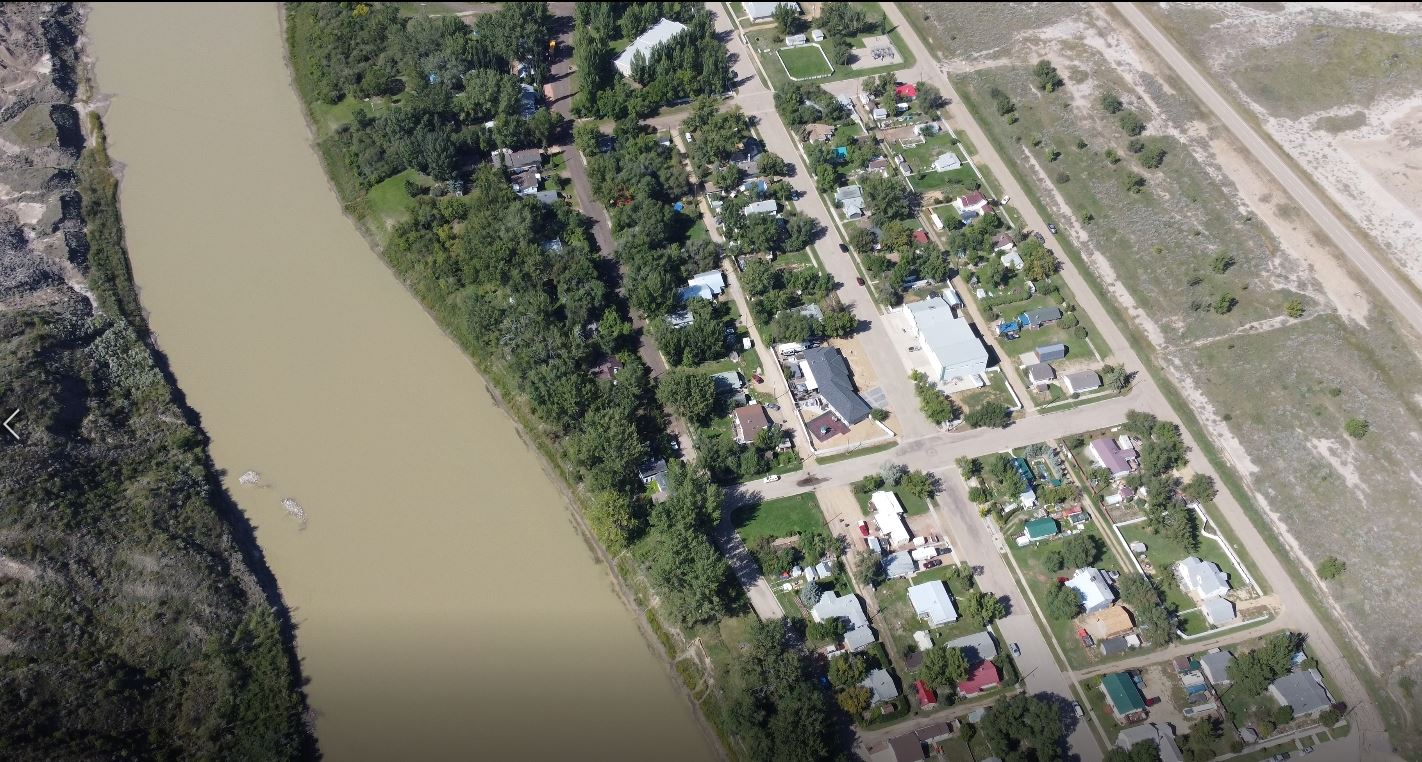
Aerial view of East Coulee

== History ==
During its peak years around 1930 and again later in the mid-1940s, East Coulee was home to over 3,000 residents and dozens of thriving businesses. In the mid-1950s, however, its population began to plummet and its business count dropped to three—a hotel, a garage and a grocery store. By 1970, the community's school had closed.

As with other coal communities, East Coulee's demise began in the 1950s due to the combination of expanding oil and natural gas industries and the transition of many industries to fuels other than coal. The reduced demand for the valley's coal resulted in the closure of all Drumheller area mines at the time except for the Atlas Mine at East Coulee. The Atlas Mine survived until 1979 as a severely scaled back version, decreasing from year-round to seasonal operation, and from employing more than 200 miners to having only 60 on the payroll. The mine's reduction in the 1950s sent much of the community's population to other areas in search of work, leaving an eerie mix of boarded-up buildings and abandoned mines amid the stark scenery of Alberta's badlands.

== Demographics ==
Population history of East Coulee
Year	Pop.	±%
1941	1,831	—
1951	1,217	−33.5%
1956	1,003	−17.6%
1961	683	−31.9%
1966	387	−43.3%
1971	312	−19.4%
1976	261	−16.3%
1981	218	−16.5%
1986	180	−17.4%
1991	175	−2.8%
1991A	182	+4.0%
1996	157	−13.7%
2001	156	−0.6%
2006	177	+13.5%
2011	140	−20.9%
2016	148	+5.7%
Source: Statistics Canada

As a designated place in the 2016 Census of Population conducted by Statistics Canada, East Coulee recorded a population of 148 living in 87 of its 119 total private dwellings, a change of 5.7% from its 2011 population of 140. With a land area of 1.39 km^{2} (0.54 sq mi), it had a population density of 106.5/km^{2} (275.8/sq mi) in 2016.

As a designated place in the 2011 Census, East Coulee had a population of 140 living in 77 of its 95 total dwellings, a −20.9% change from its 2006 population of 177. With a land area of 1.14 km^{2} (0.44 sq mi), it had a population density of 123/km^{2} (318/sq mi) in 2011.

== See also ==
- List of communities in Alberta
