= Atlas Coal Mine =

Inactive coal mine in Alberta, Canada

- Location within Alberta Location within Canada
- Location: East Coulee, Alberta, Canada; 51.32863°N 112.48251°W
- Products: Coal
- Opened: 1911
- Closed: 1984
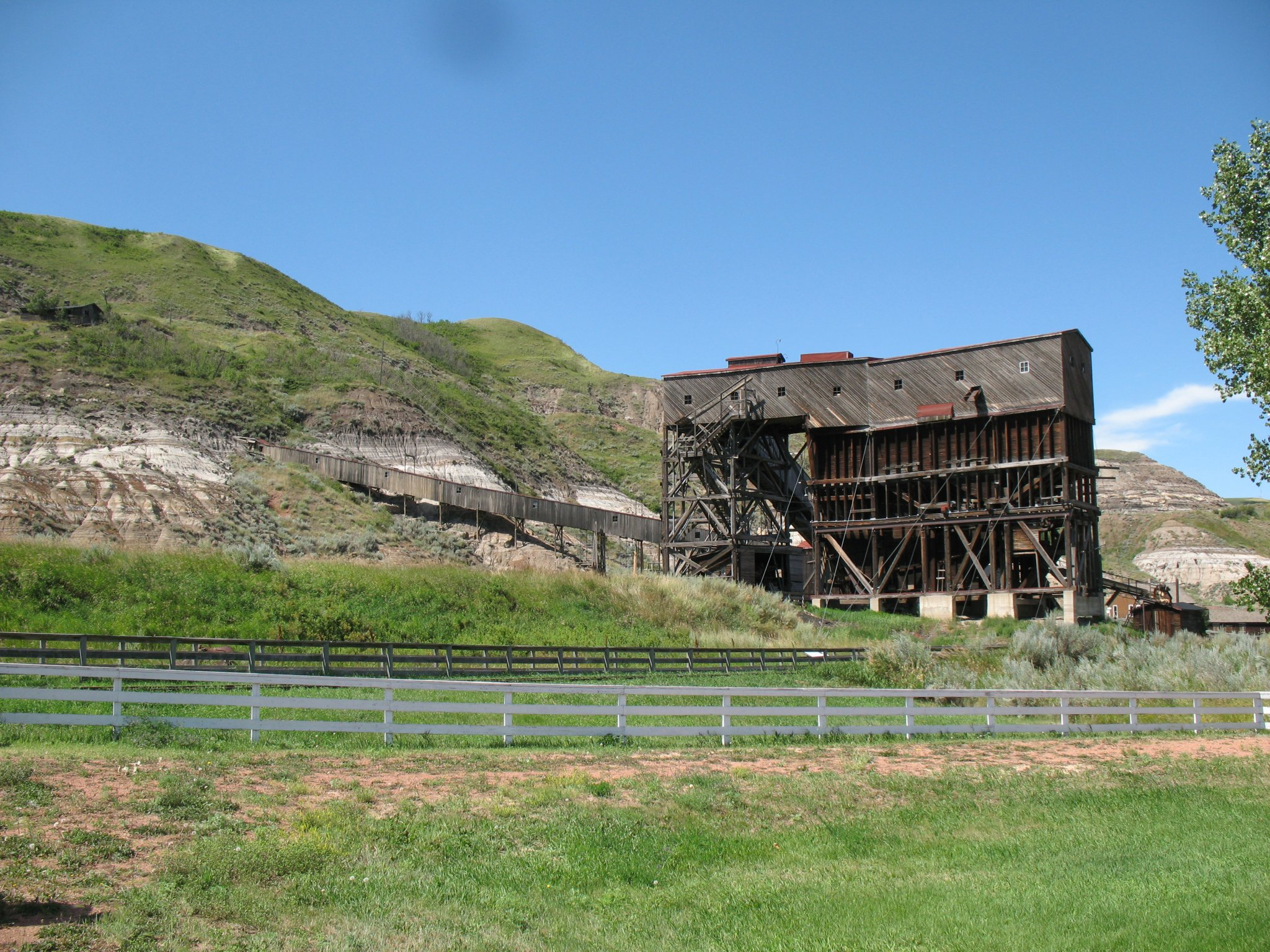
- Tipple and main ore conveyor
- Type: History Museum
- Nearest city: Drumheller

History
- Built: 1937

Site notes
- Governing body: Atlas Coal Mine Historical Society
- Visitors: (in 35,000+)
- Website: Atlas Coal Mine site

National Historic Site of Canada
- Designated: 2002

The Atlas Coal Mine National Historic Site is an inactive coal mine in Alberta, Canada that operated from 1936 to 1979. Located in East Coulee near Drumheller, it is considered to be Canada's most complete historic coal mine and is home to the country's last standing wooden coal tipple, and the largest still standing in North America. It was designated an Alberta Provincial Historic Resource in 1989 and a National Historic Site of Canada in 2002.

== History ==
The sub-bituminous coal from the Drumheller mining district was mainly used for home heating, cooking and electrical generation. It was also used to power the steam locomotives of the Canadian National and Canadian Pacific Railways on the prairies. The flat-lying seams were easier to mine than those found in more mountainous areas, with lower levels of methane gas. The coal-mining era lasted from 1911 to 1984, when the Atlas No. 3 and 4 mines closed. The Atlas No. 3 Mine structures are preserved and form the basis of the National Historic Site, administered by the Atlas Mine Historical Society.

The mine features the last wooden coal tipple in Canada. Built in 1937, the tipple is a coal loading and sorting machine. At over 7 storeys tall the tipple now serves as a reminder of the rich mining history of the Drumheller Valley. Old mining equipment, including a working pre-1936 battery powered locomotive and several buildings including the wash house, supply house, lamp house, and mine office still stand at the site. The site preserves the stories and artifacts of the men who once mined the black. The Atlas is the last of 139 mines that once ruled the valley.

Thirteen people died during the mine's operation. Four died on one day, June 24, 1941, when a gas explosion killed three, and a fourth died in a vain attempt to rescue them.

== Tourism ==
The facilities are open to visitors from May to Thanksgiving weekend. Guided tours take visitors into the past with a ride on the locomotive (dubbed Linda) and a walk up the tipple. Since 2009, the Atlas has conducted tours of the 210 foot underground conveyor tunnel and the recently restored Blacksmith Shop.
