= Municipal District of Badlands No. 7 =

- Dissolved municipal district
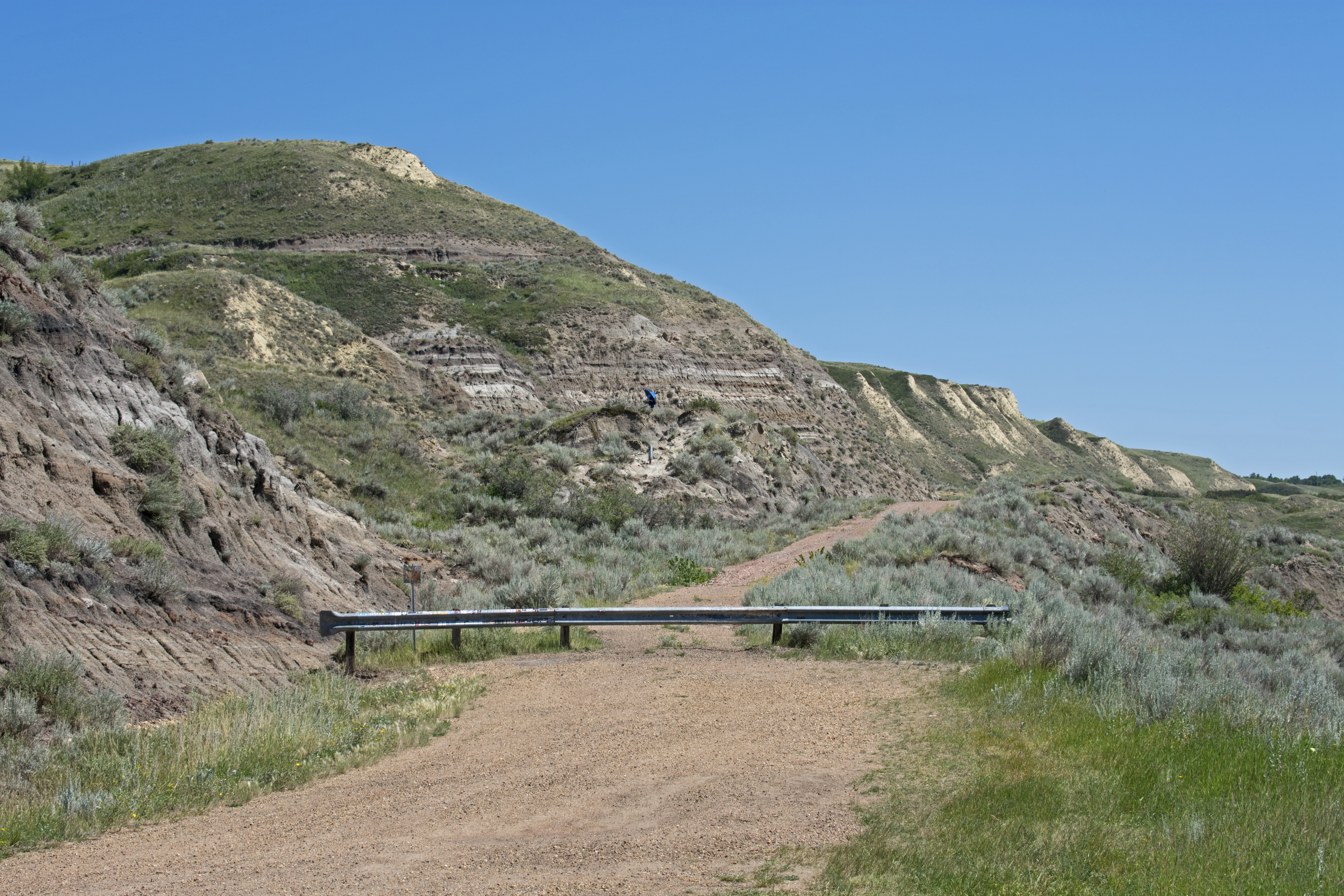
- Closed road in badlands in Wayne

- Location of the former MD of Badlands No. 7 in Alberta
- Coordinates: 51.425°N 112.639°W
- Country: Canada
- Province: Alberta
- Region: Southern Alberta
- Census division: No. 5
- Incorporated: January 1, 1991
- Dissolved: January 1, 1998
- Time zone: UTC−06:00 (Alberta Time)
- Area codes: 403, 587, 825

The Municipal District of Badlands No. 7 was a municipal district in southern Alberta, Canada. It existed for seven years between 1991 and 1998 prior to its amalgamation with the former City of Drumheller to create the current Town of Drumheller.

== History ==
The former Municipal District (MD) of Badlands No. 7 was originally established on January 1, 1991 when Improvement District No. 7 incorporated as a municipal district. Seven years later on January 1, 1998, the former MD of Badlands No. 7 and the former City of Drumheller amalgamated with each other to form the current Town of Drumheller.

== Demographics ==
Population history of the Municipal District of Badlands No. 7
| Year | Pop. | ±% |
|---|---|---|
| 1956 | 5,502 | — |
| 1961 | 4,470 | −18.8% |
| 1966 | 3,403 | −23.9% |
| 1971 | 1,860 | −45.3% |
| 1976 | 1,266 | −31.9% |
| 1981 | 1,263 | −0.2% |
| 1986 | 1,145 | −9.3% |
| 1991 | 1,191 | +4.0% |
| 1996 | 1,246 | +4.6% |
| 2001 | 1,282 | +2.9% |
Source: Statistics Canada

In the 2001 Census, the dissolved MD of Badlands No. 7 had a population of 1,282, a 2.9% change from its 1996 population of 1,246. With a land area of 70.68 km^{2} (27.29 sq mi), it had a population density of 18.1/km^{2} (47.0/sq mi) in 2001.

== See also ==
- List of communities in Alberta
- List of municipal districts in Alberta
