= Banff Springs =

Banff Springs may refer to:

- Banff Springs Hotel, in Banff, Alberta
- Banff Springs snail
- Banff Upper Hot Springs, in the Banff National Park
