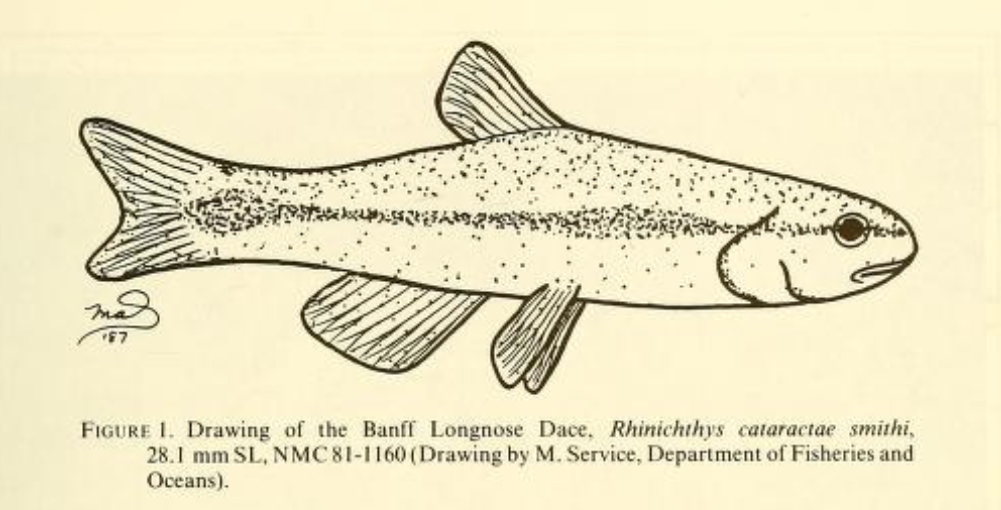
- Drawing of the Banff longnose dace by the Department of Fisheries and Oceans

Conservation status
- Presumed Extinct (NatureServe)

Scientific classification
- Kingdom: Animalia
- Phylum: Chordata
- Class: Actinopterygii
- Division: Teleostei
- Order: Cypriniformes
- Family: Leuciscidae
- Genus: Rhinichthys
- Species: R. cataractae
- Subspecies: †R. c. smithi

Trinomial name
- †Rhinichthys cataractae smithi Nichols, 1916

= Banff longnose dace =

Subspecies of fish

The Banff longnose dace (Rhinichthys cataractae smithi) was a diminutive subspecies of the longnose dace. Its endemic range was restricted to a small marsh fed by two hot springs at Cave and Basin National Historic Site on Sulphur Mountain in Banff National Park in Banff, Alberta, Canada.

== Taxonomy ==
A study conducted by Claude B. Renaud and Don E. McAllister of the National Museum of Natural Sciences (now the Canadian Museum of Nature) in Ottawa, and published in 1988, concluded that the Banff longnose dace was a distinct subspecies.

Banff longnose dace may have been more closely related to the eastern longnose dace than the westslope longnose dace, based on factors like modal vertebrae counts and lateral line scale count.

=== Evolution ===
Minimally the subspecies may have evolved postglacially from populations that survived glaciation in Southern Alberta or Montana in the upper Missouri drainage basin, and be younger than 9500 BP. Maximally it may have survived the Wisconsin glaciation in a local or larger eastern slope Alberta refugium and be much older.

=== Etymology ===
The subspecies is named after the collector Harlan I. Smith, of the Victoria Memorial Museum (now part of the Canadian Museum of Nature) in Ottawa who collected the type specimen on July 21, 1915.

== Description ==
The fish's back was olive black, its sides were light, and the undersides were a silvery-white. When viewed from the side its head was in the shape of a wedge. Adults reached a maximum length of 54 mm, which is smaller than most other populations of longnose dace. They were said to resemble the western longnose dace, but possessed less scales in the lateral line (50-60).

There was a black stripe starting from the tip of the snout and ending near the base of the tail in the fish's young.

== Distribution and habitat ==
This fish's range was limited to an outlet marsh that the Cave and Basin Hotsprings drain into, and that lead into the Bow River.

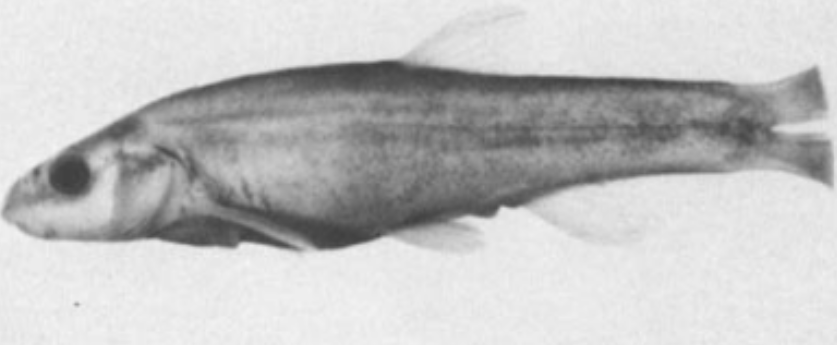
Holotype of the Banff longnose dace (AMNH)

Vegetation in the marsh was present on the muddy bottom, the water had a slight current, and the water was shallow. The marsh had an average depth of 1 meter, some of the deeper pools could reach 2 meters. Emergent vegetation was present in the shallow areas of the marsh, and submergent vegetation present throughout the marsh. The substrate of the marsh was mud. The pH at the Cave hotspring inflow was 8.5, at the Basin hotspring inflow it reached 9. In the centre it was 8, and reached 9 at the outlet of the Bow River.

== Ecology and behaviour ==
=== Reproduction ===
Spawning occurred in May, June, or early July. One parent would guard the nest and a territory would be established. The species would grow very slowly. The dace would breed once a year.

== Extinction ==
The dace has been considered extinct since 1986, and was declared extinct in April 1987 by COSEWIC. This status was re-examined and confirmed in May, 2000. No specimens have been collected since the 1970s. Some estimate that the dace's year of extinction was 1982.

=== Decline ===
The dace was first recorded in the area by ichthyologist Carl H. Eigenmann in 1892, and were noted to be very abundant at the time. The species is recorded by him as "Rhinichthys dulcis" which is a name that refers to the westslope subspecies of longnose dace.

There were still pure Banff longnose dace present in 1925.

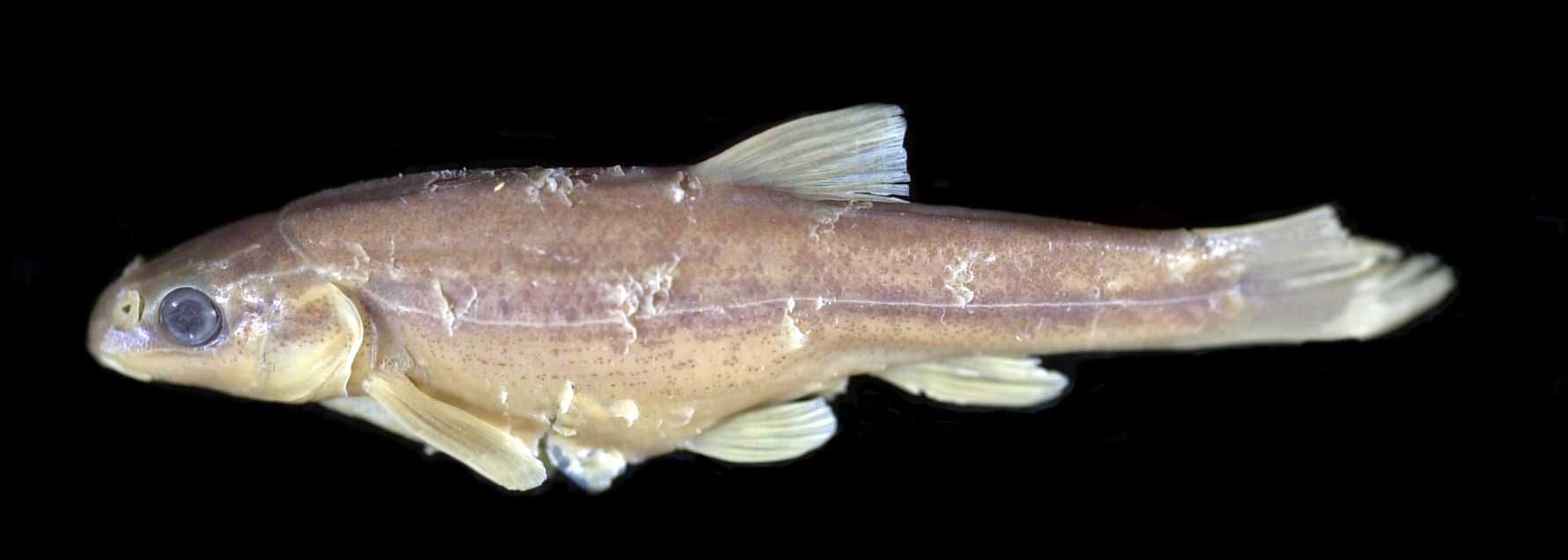
Holotype of the Banff longnose dace (AMNH)

A collection survey conducted, on behest of Don E. McAllister, in a marsh below the hotsprings on June 1, 1968 did not report any Banff longnose dace.

Don E. McAllister suggests in a 1970 publication that the Banff longnose dace may be extinct, and posits the cause as the introduction of tropical fish.

Don E. McAllister and Charles G. Gruchy remark that the dace is still surviving in 1971.

Jacqueline Lanteigne states in a 1988 publication that the dace is considered extinct.

In a 1988 study, investigating the taxonomic status of the dace, about 32% of the 1920-40? samples were confidently assignable to the Banff longnose dace. At the most 14% of the 1971-81 samples, from the same 1988 study, were considered to be Banff longnose dace. These results were based on the presence of 48-58 lateral line scales, 6-7 dorsal rays, or both. This study posits that based on these results most of the Banff longnose dace were either extirpated or hybridized between the years of 1925-1971.

=== Causes ===
==== Habitat Degradation and Alteration ====
The development of a popular thermal swimming pool at the Cave and Basin National Historic Site eventually led to chlorine leakage into the dace's habitat. Human waste from heavy usage of the springs, coupled with a lack of adequate treatment facilities, may have had a negative impact on the dace's habitat. De-icing salt and pesticides may have also been pollutants. Hotspring flow may have been altered during construction, repair, cleaning, and filling of the baths. Reductions or stoppages of flow may have caused sudden alterations of temperature, lowering water levels, stranding eggs, or stranding young and adults.

Construction of a beaver dam at the end of the marsh may have also obstructed the dace's movement. The dam was supposedly built after 1918.

==== Introduced Species ====
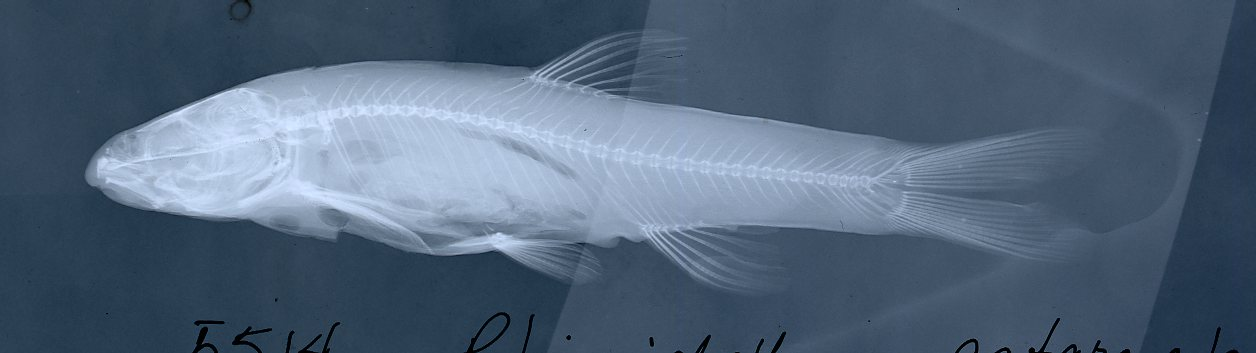
X-Ray image of Banff longnose dace holotype (AMNH)

Deliberate introduction of western mosquitofish for mosquito control in 1924 was followed by the release of various tropical fish including the sailfin molly, green swordtail, angelfish, guppies, zebra cichlid, Siamese fighting fish, blue gourami, and African jewelfish (and aquarium plants). Non-tropical fish like brook trout were also introduced. Results and enquiries made during a collection survey done on June 1, 1968 suggested that the introduction of tropical species, other than the mosquitofish, may have occurred from 1958-1967. The introduced exotic fish competed with the dace for food, nesting sites, and preyed on unhatched eggs. The introduction of these species may have also introduced diseases and parasites that the dace were not previously exposed to. The introduced species also bred more often than the dace, increasing their numbers at a faster rate.

==== Hybridization ====
A 1988 study presented evidence that Banff longnose dace had hybridized with eastern longnose dace from the nearby Bow River, and by the time of the study few if any unhybridized individuals of the original Banff subspecies remained.

== See also ==
- Banff Springs snail
- List of North American animals extinct in the Holocene
