= The Rimrock Resort Hotel =

Hotel in Banff, Alberta, Canada

Coordinates: 51°9′5″N 115°33′33″W

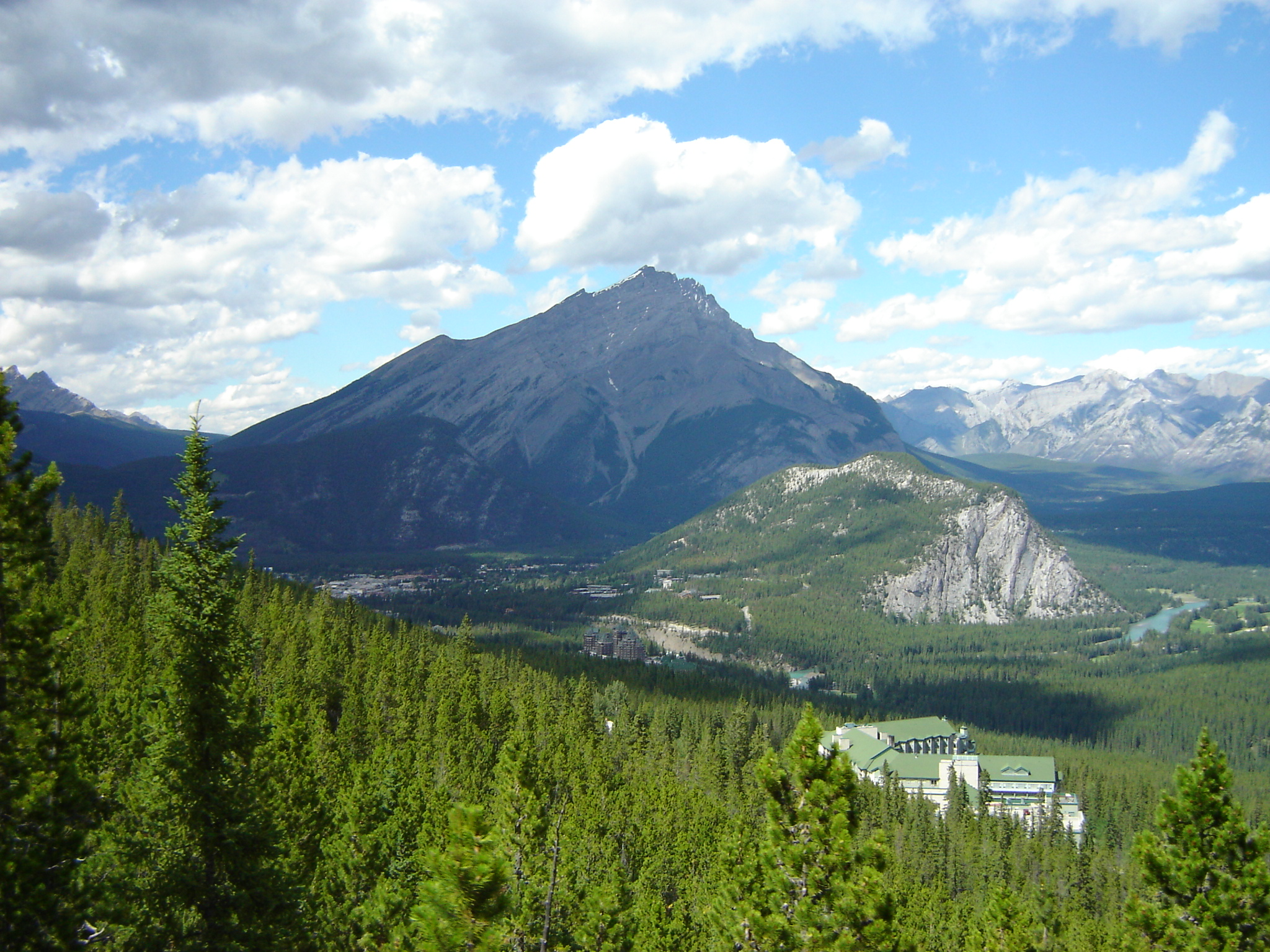
Looking down at the hotel and surroundings from Banff Gondola

The Rimrock Resort Hotel is a hotel in Banff, Alberta, Canada, on the slope of Sulphur Mountain, within Banff National Park. It has 346 rooms and 21 suites, two restaurants (Primrose and Eden), two lounges (Larkspur and Divas) and a coffee shop. U.S. News & World Report voted it the fifth best hotel in the province in 2015, and noted that it was included in the Travel + Leisure 500 World's Best Hotels for 2015.
