= List of communities in Canada by elevation =

Canada has at least 35 urban communities at elevations of 1,000 m (3,300 ft) or greater above sea level.

Community	Province	Elevation (m)	Population (Year)
Lake Louise	Alberta	1,600 m (5,200 ft)	691 (2011)
Banff	Alberta	1,400 m (4,600 ft)	7,851 (2016)
Canmore	Alberta	1,375 m (4,511 ft)	13,992 (2016)
Coleman	Alberta	1,320 m (4,330 ft)	1,545 (2016)
Del Bonita	Alberta	1,305 m (4,281 ft)	6 (2008)
Elkford	British Columbia	1,300 m (4,300 ft)	2,499 (2016)
Grande Cache	Alberta	1,220 m (4,000 ft)	3,571 (2016)
Wells	British Columbia	1,211 m (3,973 ft)	226 (2016)
Cowley	Alberta	1,175 m (3,855 ft)	209 (2016)
Cochrane	Alberta	1,159 m (3,802 ft)	32,199 (2021)
Diamond Valley	Alberta	1,159–1,215 m (3,802–3,986 ft)	5,341 (2021)
Sparwood	British Columbia	1,143 m (3,750 ft)	3,784 (2016)
Pincher Creek	Alberta	1,130 m (3,710 ft)	3,642 (2016)
Cardston	Alberta	1,130–1,190 m (3,710–3,900 ft)	3,585 (2016)
Kimberley	British Columbia	1,120 m (3,670 ft)	7,425 (2016)
Crossfield	Alberta	1,113 m (3,652 ft)	2,983 (2016)
Swan Hills	Alberta	1,113 m (3,652 ft)	1,301 (2016)
Logan Lake	British Columbia	1,119 m (3,671 ft)	1,993 (2016)
Airdrie	Alberta	1,098 m (3,602 ft)	74,100 (2021)
Sundre	Alberta	1,093 m (3,586 ft)	2,729 (2016)
Jasper	Alberta	1,060 m (3,480 ft)	4,590 (2016)
Carstairs	Alberta	1,060 m (3,480 ft)	4,077 (2016)
Milk River	Alberta	1,059 m (3,474 ft)	827 (2016)
Okotoks	Alberta	1,051 m (3,448 ft)	30,405 (2021)
Vulcan	Alberta	1,049 m (3,442 ft)	1,917 (2016)
Calgary	Alberta	1,045 m (3,428 ft)	1,306,784 (2021)
Stavely	Alberta	1,044 m (3,425 ft)	541 (2016)
Olds	Alberta	1,041 m (3,415 ft)	9,184 (2016)
High River	Alberta	1,040 m (3,410 ft)	13,584 (2016)
Didsbury	Alberta	1,037 m (3,402 ft)	5,268 (2016)
Claresholm	Alberta	1,030 m (3,380 ft)	3,780 (2016)
Nanton	Alberta	1,024 m (3,360 ft)	2,181 (2016)
Rossland	British Columbia	1,023 m (3,356 ft)	3,729 (2016)
Warner	Alberta	1,021 m (3,350 ft)	373 (2016)
Fernie	British Columbia	1,009 m (3,310 ft)	5,136 (2016)
