= 2014 Alberta Winter Games =

- Alberta Winter Games Logo "Reach your peak"
- Location: Banff and Canmore, Alberta
- Start date: February 6, 2014
- End date: February 9, 2014
- Competitors: 2000+ from 8 (zones) nations

The 2014 Alberta Winter Games is a multi-sport event that was hosted in Banff and Canmore, Alberta on February 6–9, 2014. Approximately 2,500 athletes participated from the eight zones in Alberta. The 2014 Alberta Winter Games has one mascot.

== Awarding ==
The Bow Valley was awarded the 2014 Alberta Winter Games on September 7, 2011. They chose this area because the town of Banff had recently built several new state-of-the-art facilities such as the Banff Fenlands Centre which hold two skating rinks and four curling sheets.
