= Cave and Basin National Historic Site =

Historic site in Banff, Alberta, Canada

Coordinates: 51°10′06″N 115°35′29″W

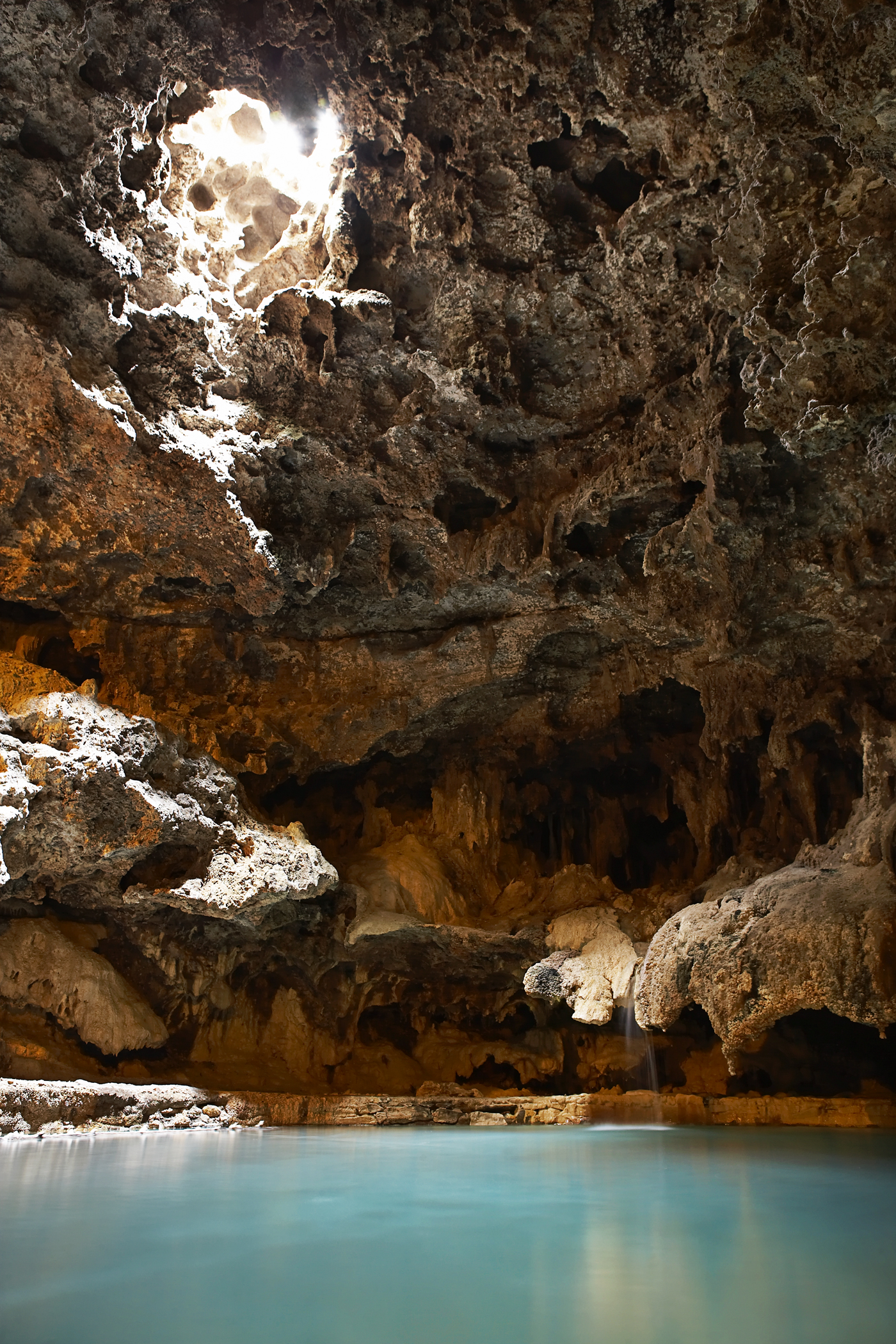
- The Cave at Cave and Basin National Historic Site
- Interactive map of Cave and Basin National Historic Site
- Location: Banff, Alberta, Canada

History
- Founded: 1885
- Founder: Frank McCabe and brothers Tom and William McCardell
- Built: 1914 (pool structure)

Site notes
- Elevation: 1,405 m (4,610 ft)
- Governing body: Parks Canada
- Website: parks.canada.ca/lhn-nhs/ab/caveandbasin

National Historic Site of Canada

The Cave and Basin National Historic Site of Canada is located in the town of Banff, Alberta, within the Canadian Rocky Mountains, at the site of natural thermal mineral springs around which Canada's first national park, Banff National Park, was established.

== Geology and setting ==
The Cave and Basin is the lowest component of nine sulphurous hot springs clustered in three groups on the northeast flank of Sulphur Mountain. All are located along the Sulphur Mountain Thrust Fault below Devonian limestones. The water is heated geothermally from an estimated depth of three kilometres. The Cave and Basin is the only cavern large enough to comfortably accommodate groups of people.

== History ==
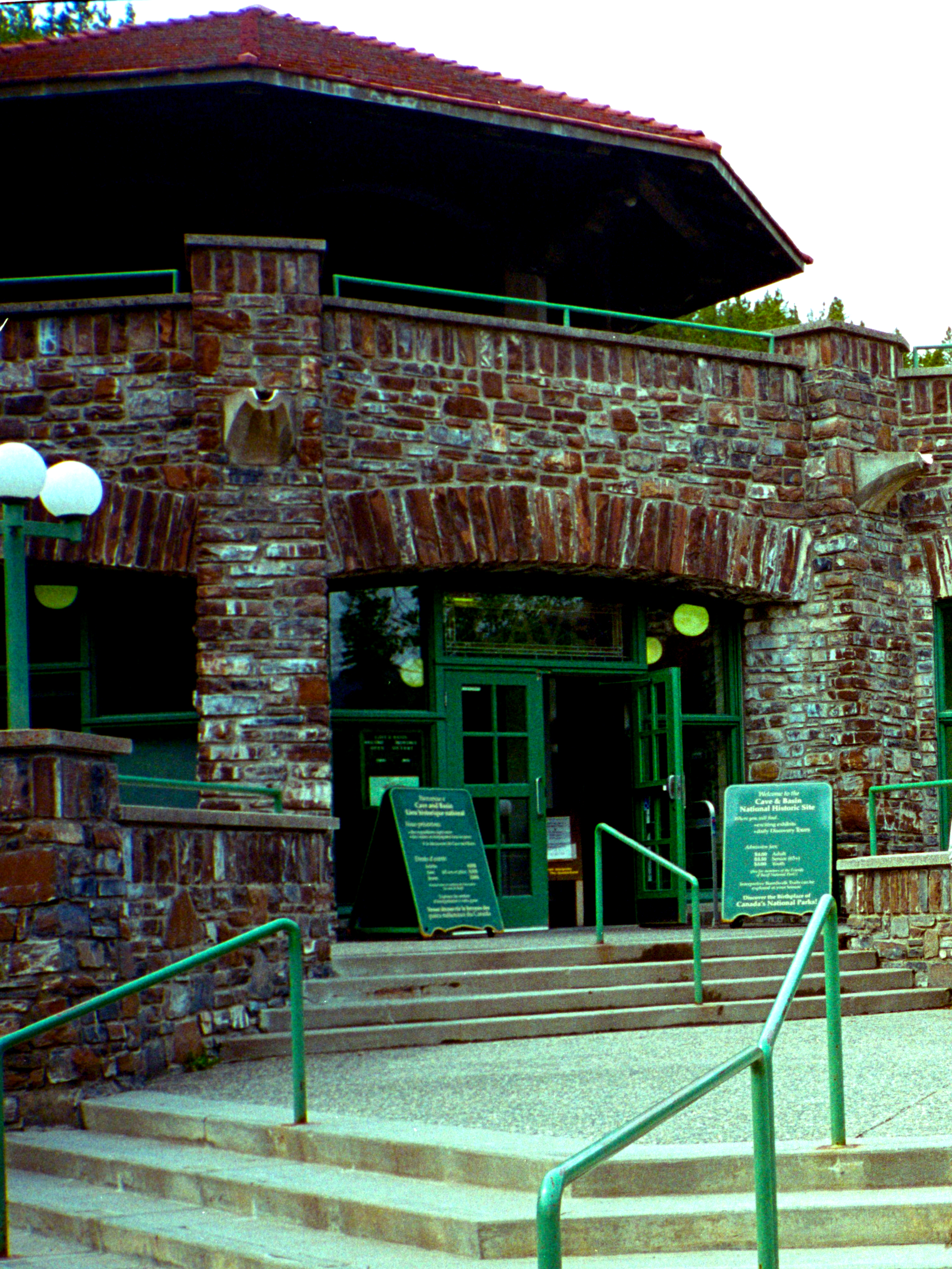
The entrance to the Cave and Basin building.

Human habitation in this area can be traced back to 10,700 years BC with the retreat of the last great glaciation. The Cave and Basin is a special place with important and longstanding cultural significance to many Indigenous Peoples. The first written recorded reference to hot springs here is by James Hector of the Palliser Expedition in 1859, followed by Joe Healey in 1874 who happened upon the Cave and Basin site in 1875, long after Indigenous Peoples. But it was Canadian Pacific Railway workers Frank McCabe and brothers Tom and William McCardell who brought national attention to the Cave and Basin. In 1883 they descended through the skylight entrance into the cave using a felled tree, and the following year constructed a small cabin nearby with the intention of commercializing the Cave and Basin site. Conflicting claims by other parties prompted intervention by the Canadian government headed by John A. Macdonald, and in 1885 an order-in-council reserved 10 square miles (26 km^{2}) around the Cave and Basin, the Banff Hot Springs Reserve. This was the genesis of Canada's national parks system. In 1886 the Canadian government held an inquiry into the various private claims to settle on compensation.

In 1886 an artificial tunnel was driven into the Cave and Basin to aid visitation. In 1912 bottled water from the Cave and Basin site was sold for its alleged curative powers. In 1914 a naturally heated swimming pool was opened to the public and continued to operate until 1994.

The Cave and Basin was formally declared a National Historic Site in 1981. Canada's national parks system celebrated its centennial in 1985, on the anniversary of the order-in-council that established the original reserve around the Cave and Basin. On 20 August of that year, Prince Philip, Duke of Edinburgh and consort of the Queen of Canada, unveiled the National Historic Site plaque.

== Facilities ==
The built facilities include an artificial tunnel to natural grotto, a replica of the original 1887 bathhouse, the restored 1916 swimming pool and structure, interpretive displays, hiking and snowshoe trails. The 1887 bathhouse, the first structure on the site, proved inadequate by 1902, and a new pool was built in 1904. The stone bathhouse was completed in 1914, designed by architect Walter S. Painter. The pools were closed in 1975, restored in 1985, then closed again in 1992. An interpretive center now uses the structures. The Banff Upper Hot Springs is a separate facility some 5 km (3 mi) southeast of the Cave and Basin.

Many of the early structures were built by detainees held at a World War I Ukrainian Canadian internment camp located nearby. The camp held citizens of countries with which Canada was at war at the time, and had a significant Ukrainian contingent. A permanent exhibit about Canada's first national internment operations was opened at the Cave and Basin site, postponed three months by extensive flooding across southern Alberta, on 13 September 2013, with an address by Jason Kenney, Minister of Employment and Social Development and Minister for Multiculturalism.

== Environmental ==
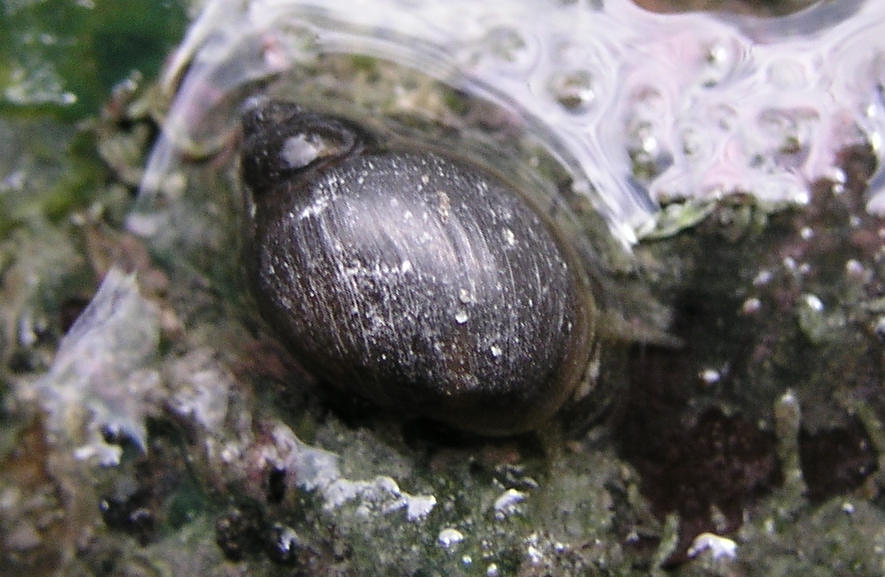
Banff snail, approximately 3–5 mm.

Almost all of the delicate cave formations had been stripped out of the Cave and Basin immediately following its 'discovery'. According to articles in the Calgary Herald at the time, the construction of the artificial tunnel was contentious even in 1887. In 1924 western mosquitofish were introduced into the hot springs in an attempt to control mosquitos. Tropical fish illegally introduced into the lower springs by local aquarium enthusiasts may have contributed to the extinction of the Banff longnose dace. Cave and Basin hot springs are also notable as the habitat for the Banff Springs snail, listed as an endangered species in 2000 by the Committee on the Status of Endangered Wildlife in Canada.

== Gallery ==
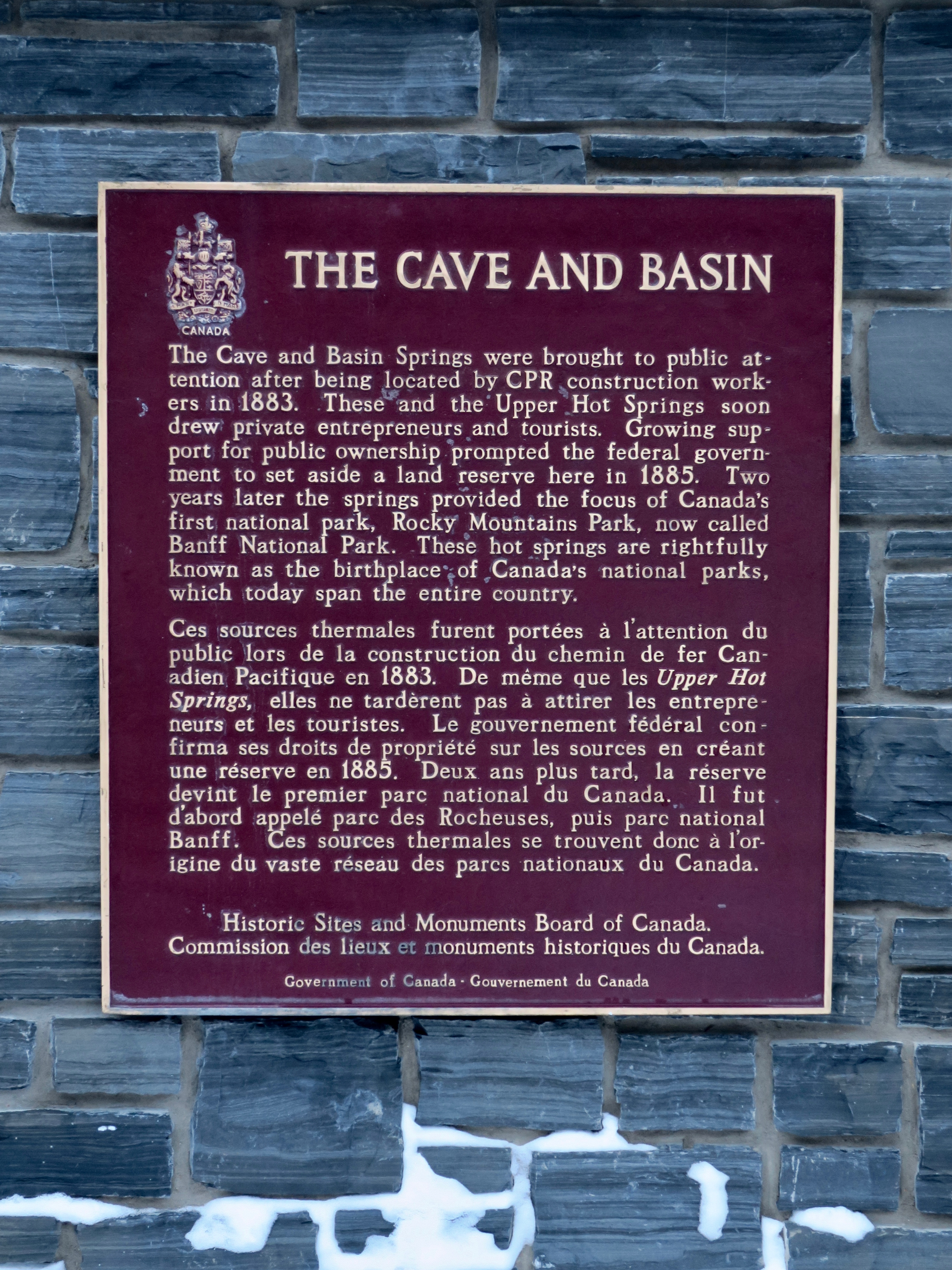
Cave and Basin National Historic Site

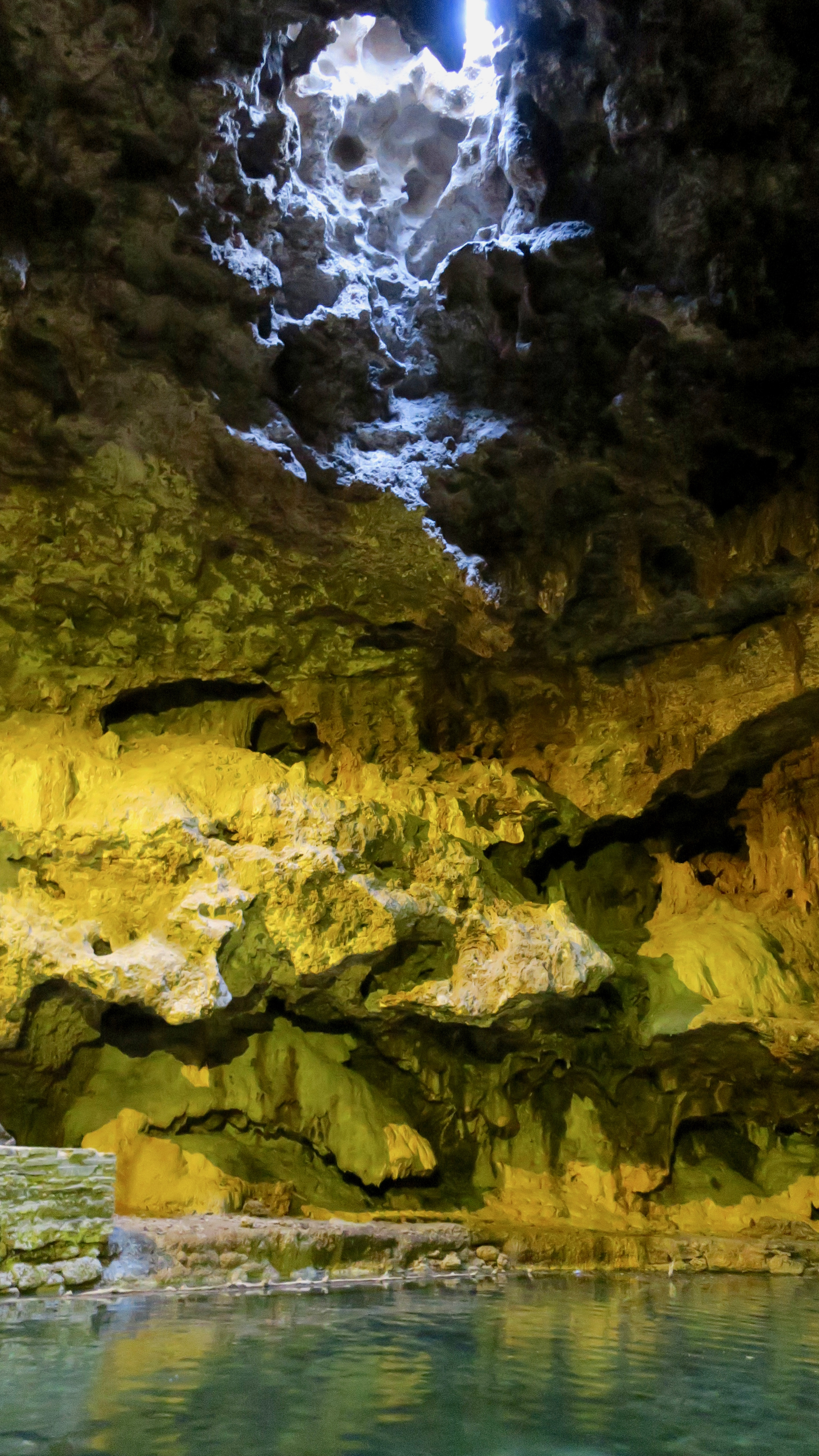
Cave and Basin National Historic Site

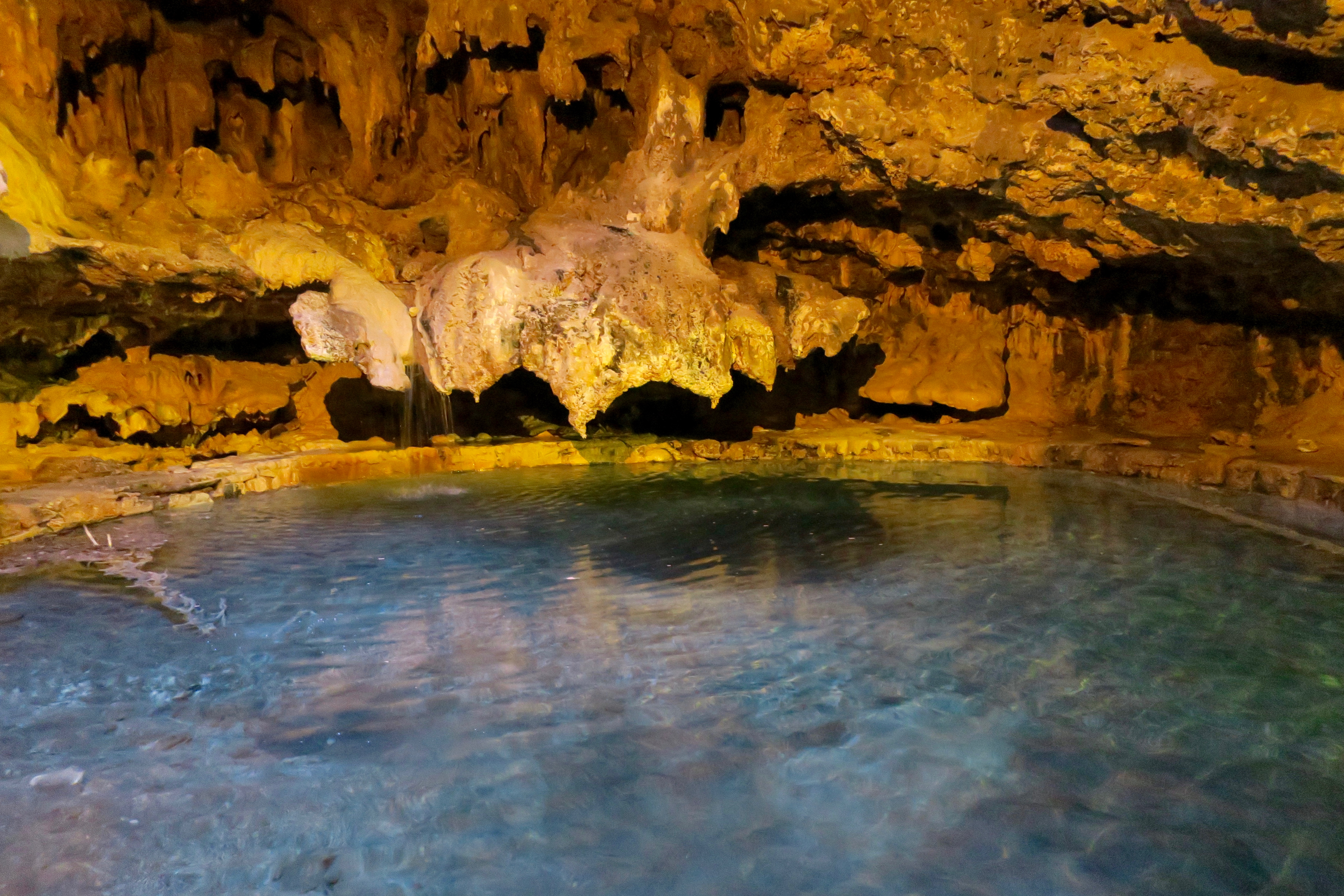
Cave and Basin National Historic Site

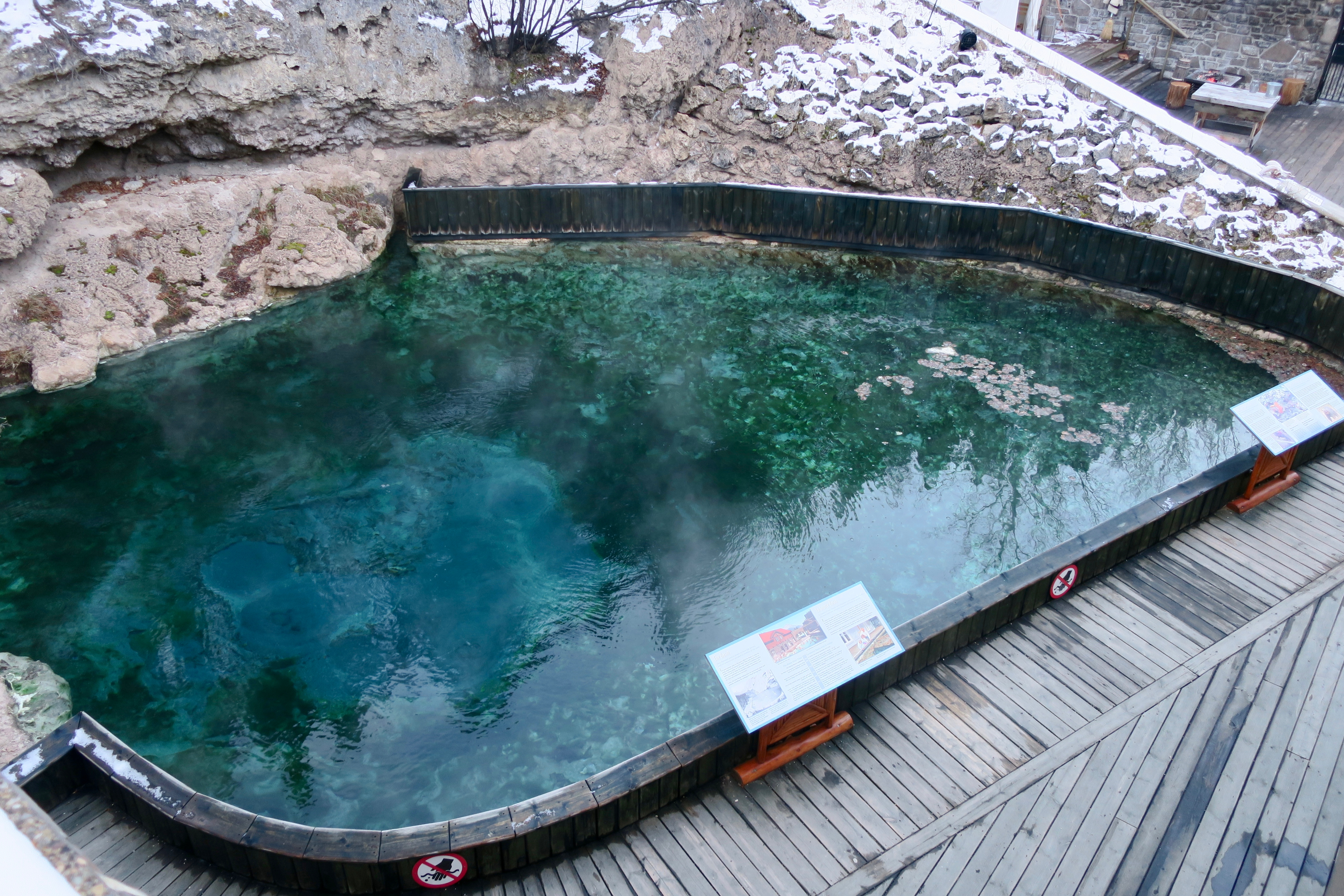
Cave and Basin National Historic Site

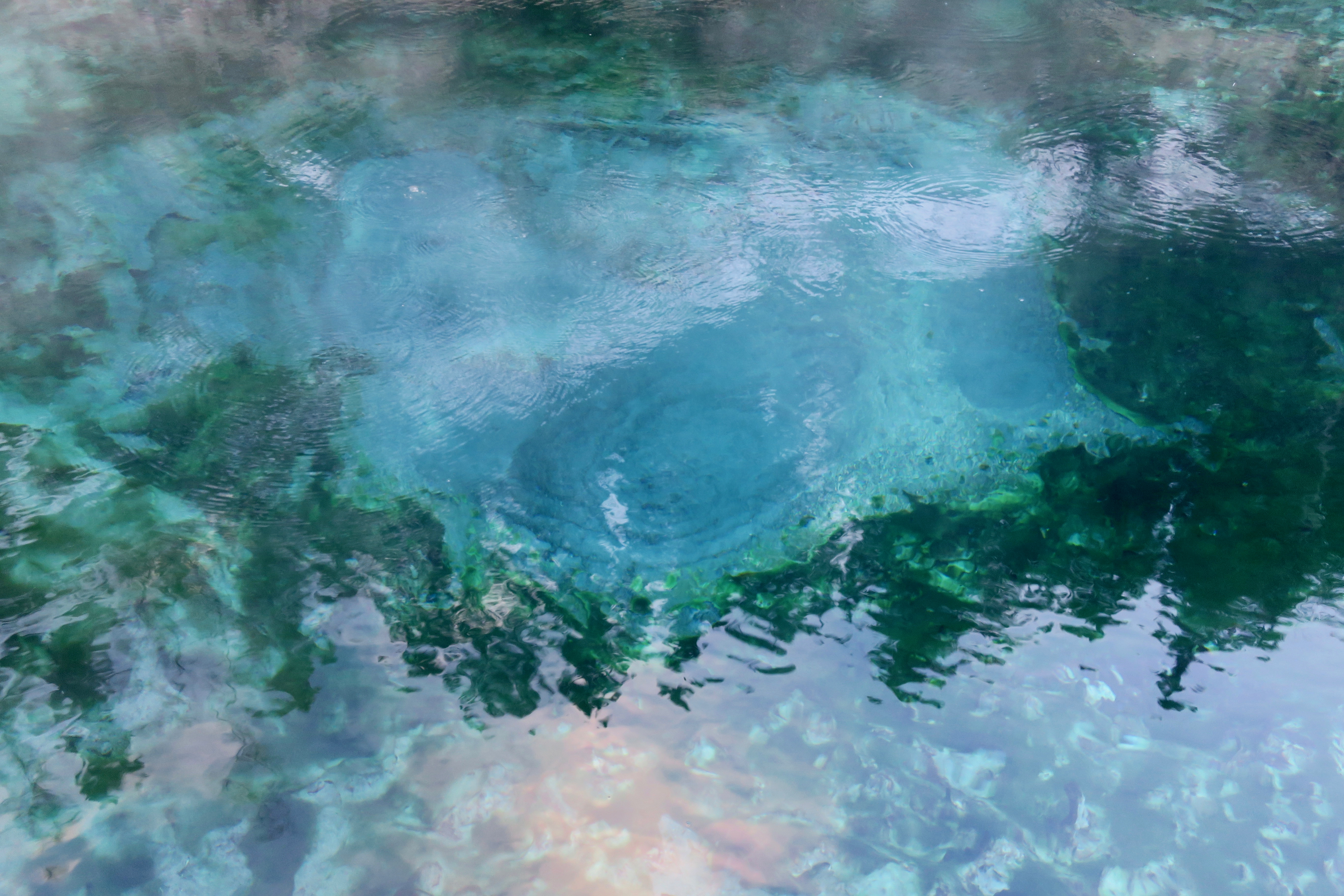
Cave and Basin National Historic Site
