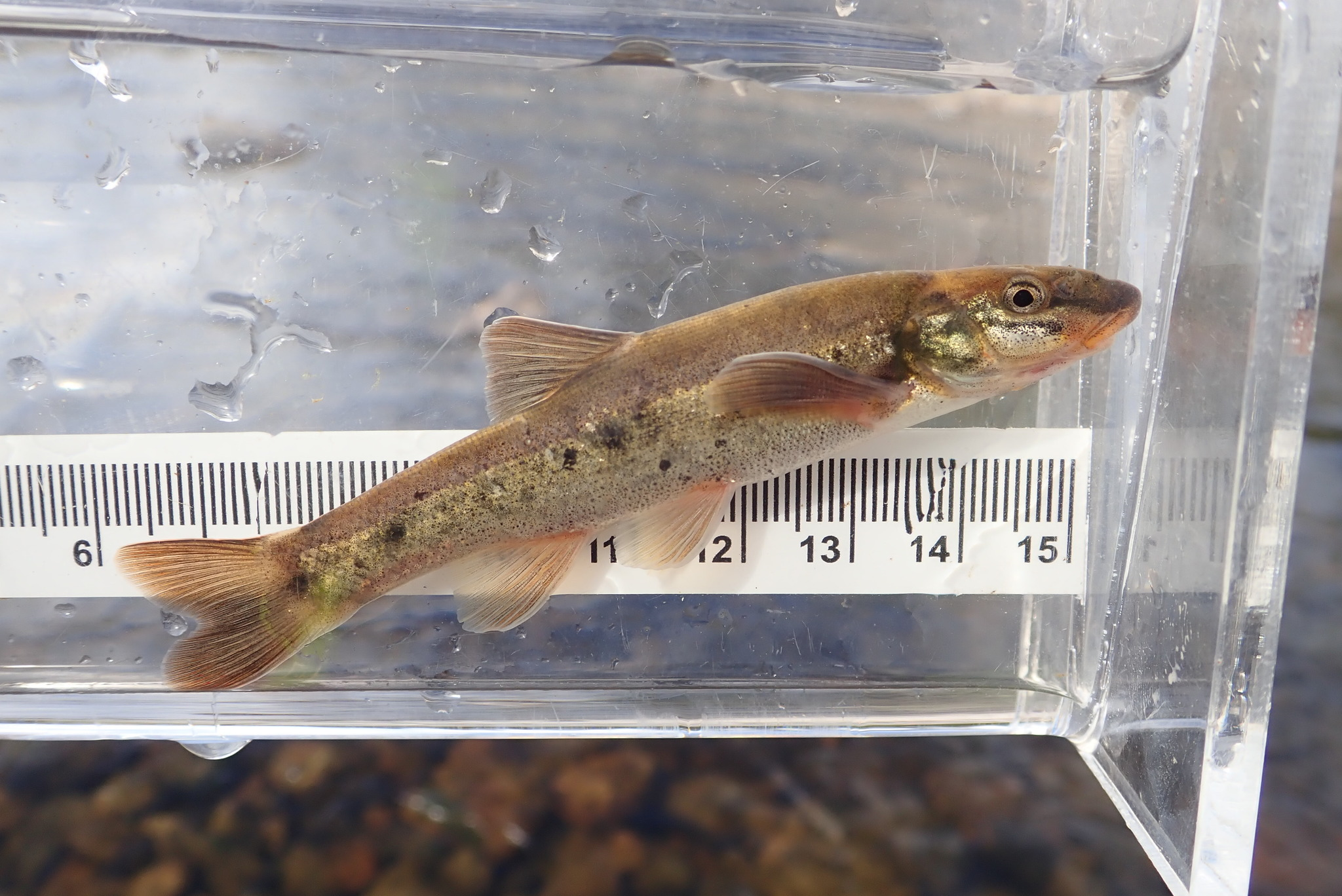

Conservation status
- Least Concern (IUCN 3.1)

Scientific classification
- Kingdom: Animalia
- Phylum: Chordata
- Class: Actinopterygii
- Order: Cypriniformes
- Family: Leuciscidae
- Subfamily: Pogonichthyinae
- Genus: Rhinichthys
- Species: R. cataractae

Binomial name
- Rhinichthys cataractae (Valenciennes, 1842)

Synonyms
- Gobio cataractae Valenciennes, 1842; Leuciscus nasutus Ayres, 1843; Rhinichthys marmoratus Agassiz, 1850; Argyreus dulcis Girard, 1856; Rhinichthys transmontanus Cope, 1879; Rhinichthys luteus Garman, 1881; Rhinichthys ocella Garman, 1881; †Rhinichthys cataractae smithi Nichols, 1916

= Longnose dace =

Species of fish

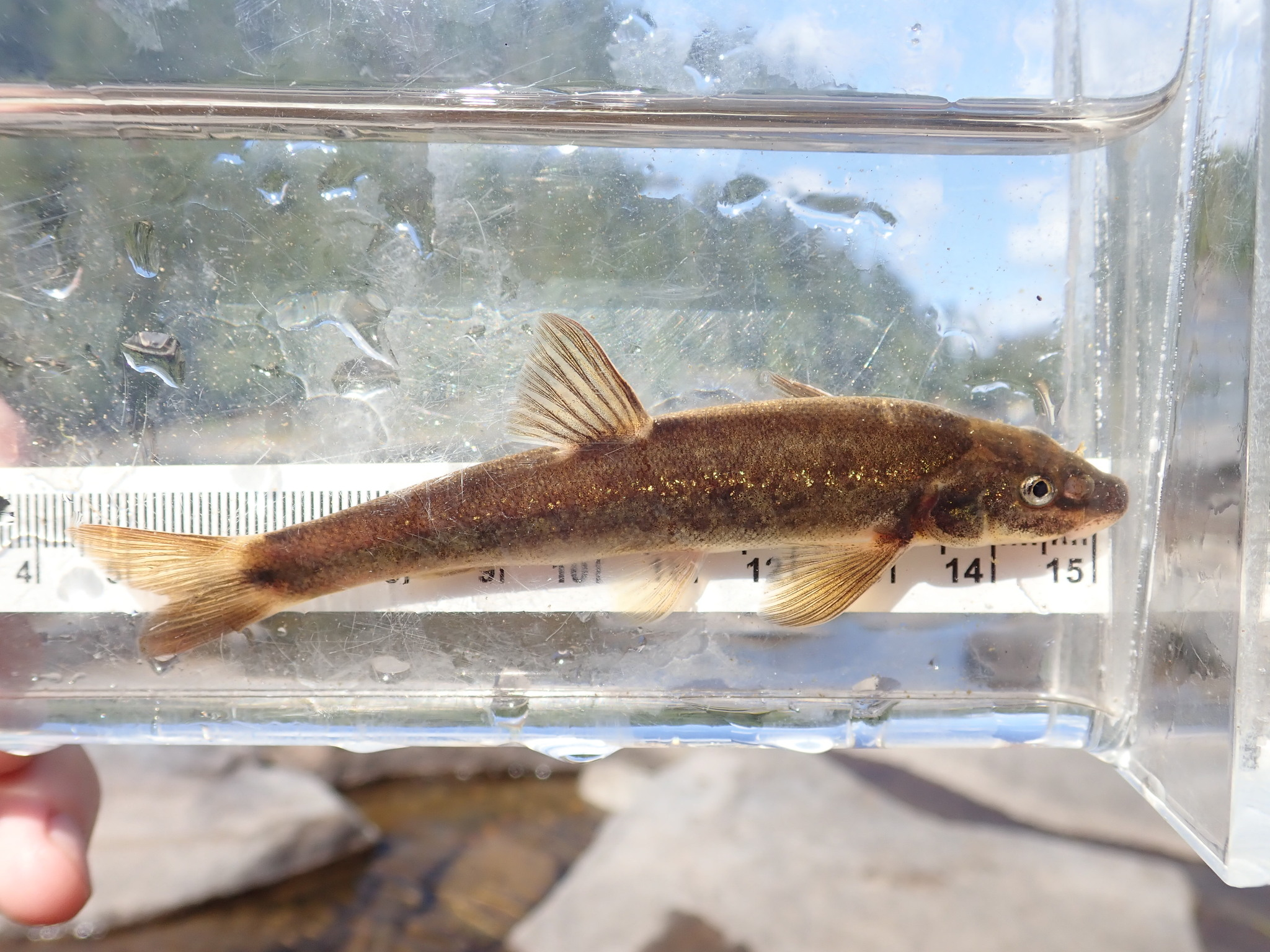
Fish caught in the Thunder Bay District, Ontario.

The longnose dace (Rhinichthys cataractae) is a freshwater minnow native to North America. Rhinicthys means snout fish (reference to the long snout) and cataractae means of the cataract (first taken from Niagara Falls). Longnose dace are small, typically less than 100 mm and characterized by their fleshy snout that protrudes past the mouth. They are well adapted for living on the bottom of fast-flowing streams among stones. Longnose dace eat algae and aquatic insects and are important forage minnows for larger predatory fish.

== Description ==
Longnose dace can be mistaken for suckers because of their subterminal "sucker-like" mouth. However, longnose dace (like all members of the family Cyprinidae) lack small fleshy projections, called papillae, on their mouths.

Juveniles have a black lateral line that extends from the beginning of the eye to the caudal fin that fades as the fish matures. The lateral line in juveniles is not present in all populations. In adults, the dorsal side is dark green to black, the lateral side is darkish to silvery with mottling often present, and the ventral side is pearly. Both adult males and females may have bright orange-reddish colouration at the base of pectoral, pelvic, and anal fins and on the upper lip. This colouration is typically associated with breeding males in the subspecies Rhinichthys cataractae cataractae, but the validity of this subspecies has yet to be confirmed. Museum specimens of females also show intense orange-reddish colouration at the base of the fins and upper lip, therefore colouration is not an accurate predictor of sex.

The maximum length of longnose dace is 170 mm (6.7 in), but they are usually less than 100 mm (3.9 in).

== Geographic distribution ==
Longnose dace have the widest distribution of any cyprinid in North America, with a range reaching as far south as the Rocky Mountains in northern New Mexico and as far north as the Mackenzie River near the Arctic Circle and across the continent from the Pacific to Atlantic coast. Multiple refugia during the most recent glacial maximum may explain the broad geographic distribution of longnose dace. There were up to three possible glacial refuges during Pleistocene glaciations: the Pacific, the Mississippi and the Atlantic. Longnose dace on the Quebec peninsula likely originated only from the Atlantic refuge, in contrast to other fish species on the peninsula that originated from multiple refugia. Longnose dace in northwestern North America originated from a Pacific refuge.

== Ecology ==
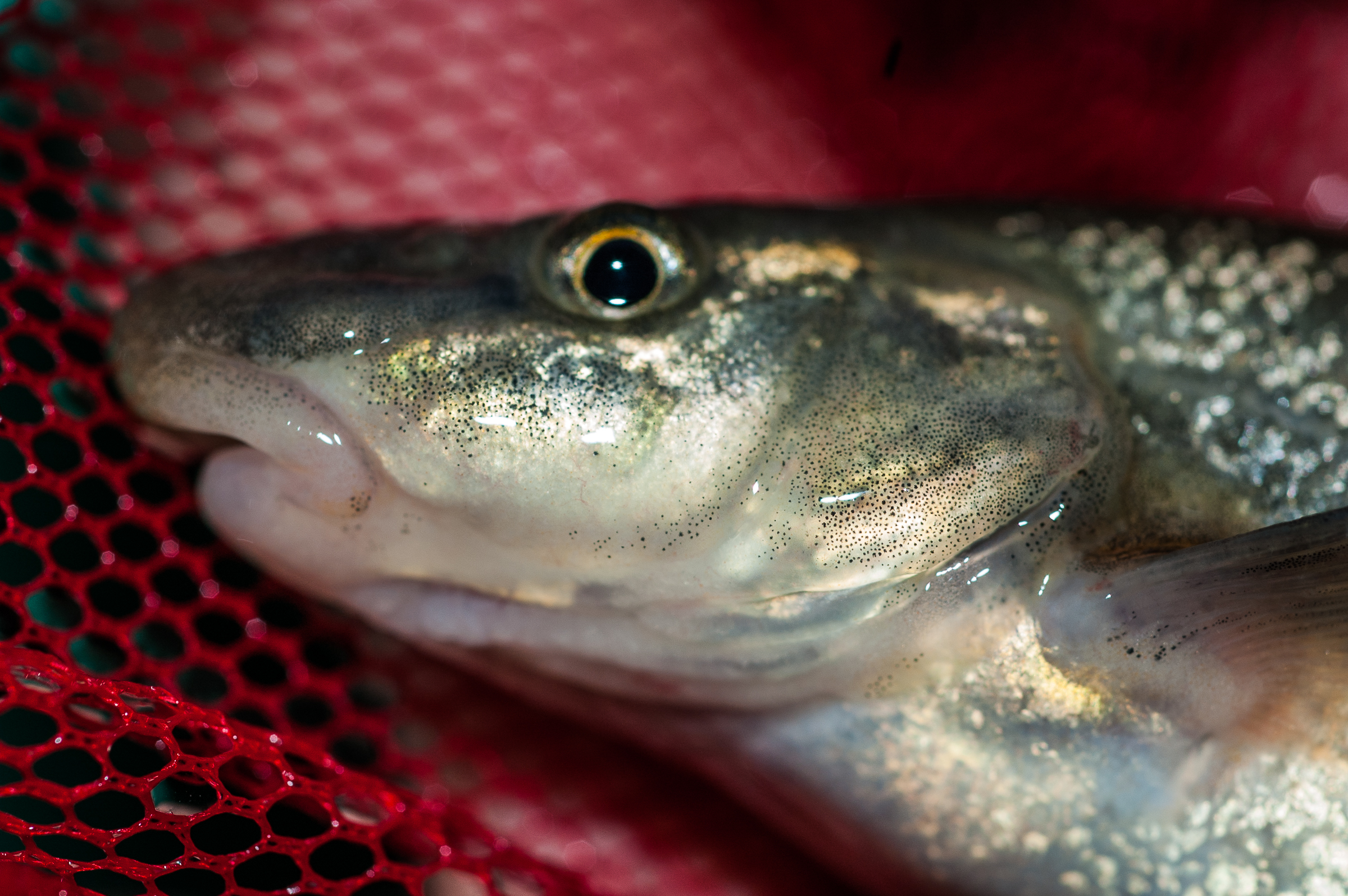
The tiny dark spots on the body of the longnose dace help it to blend in with sand and gravel, camouflaging the fish from predators.

Longnose dace occur in moderately cool water streams, rivers and lakes with temperatures up to 22 °C (72 °F). Longnose dace are benthic and preferentially occupy rock and gravel substrate. During the day longnose dace hide under rocks. Longnose dace prefer shallow, fast-moving riffles in streams and rivers and the turbulent, near-shore region of lakes.

Range map.

Longnose dace are opportunistic foragers. Small longnose dace (≤ 50 mm (2.0 in)) primarily consume algae and benthic invertebrates dace (> 50 mm (2.0 in)) feed on fish scales, fish eggs, terrestrial insects, and aquatic benthic macroinvertebrates, although diet varies seasonally. They are nocturnal feeders, possibly to avoid predation and/or salmonid competitors.

Longnose dace have small home ranges and high site fidelity, however there is evidence that a small proportion are able to disperse distances greater than 500 km (310 mi).

== Life history ==
Longnose dace reach reproductive maturity at age two and have a mean lifespan of three years. Males and females have a maximum age of four and five, respectively.

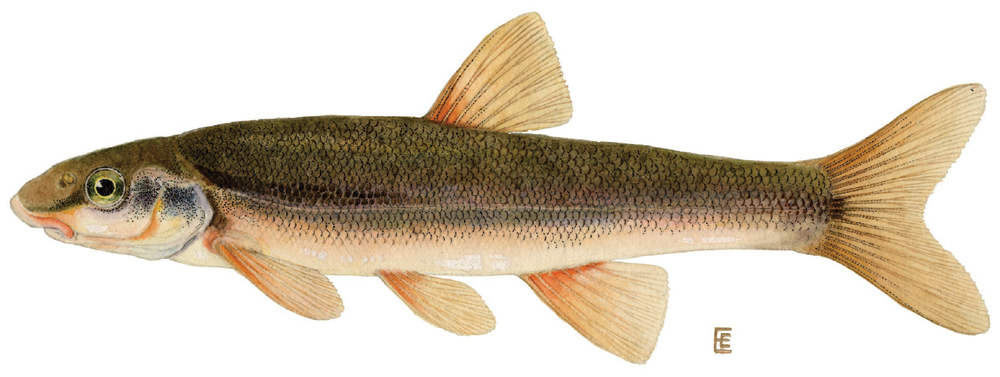
Painting by Ellen Edmonson.

Longnose dace typically spawn from May to August in water 14 to 19 °C (57 to 66 °F) and some populations are multiple spawners. Time of spawning is dependent on water temperature. Longnose dace are polygynandrous and males create and defend territories to attract females to enter and spawn. Males form a depression in the rocky substrate and vibrate to attract a female. When a female is receptive, she enters the territory and pushes her snout into substrate in a similar manner as the male. Both male and female tremble over the depression and release eggs and milt. Limited or no parental care is provided to young-of-the-year after hatching.

== Anthropogenic disturbance ==
In southern Alberta longnose dace are exposed to organic, estrogen-like compounds. Downstream of wastewater effluent from the city of Red Deer longnose dace are larger, increase in abundance, and have larger livers but males have reduced ability to produce testosterone. Despite a morphologically healthy appearance, longnose dace in the Red Deer River are physiologically stressed. In the Oldman River, some longnose dace populations are characterized by elevated vitellogenin expression, female biased sex ratios and intersex gonads. Feminization is likely caused by estrogen-like compounds present in municipal wastewater effluent, agriculture, and cattle operations near the Oldman River, however this mechanism is not well understood. It is not known if increased vitellogenin expression and intersex gonads significantly decrease reproductive success and will impact the long term viability of longnose dace in these systems. There is not evidence of skewed sex ratios in the Bow River.
