= Banff Upper Hot Springs =

Thermal springs in Canada

Coordinates: 51°9′2″N 115°33′39″W

Banff Upper Hot Springs are commercially developed hot springs located in Banff National Park in Alberta, Canada, near the Banff townsite. Europeans first became aware of the springs in 1883. As it has been developed since, the hot pool is outdoors and while in the pool, visitors can look across the valley to Mount Rundle. It is located at 1,585 metres (5,200 ft) of elevation, which makes it the highest hot spring in Canada.

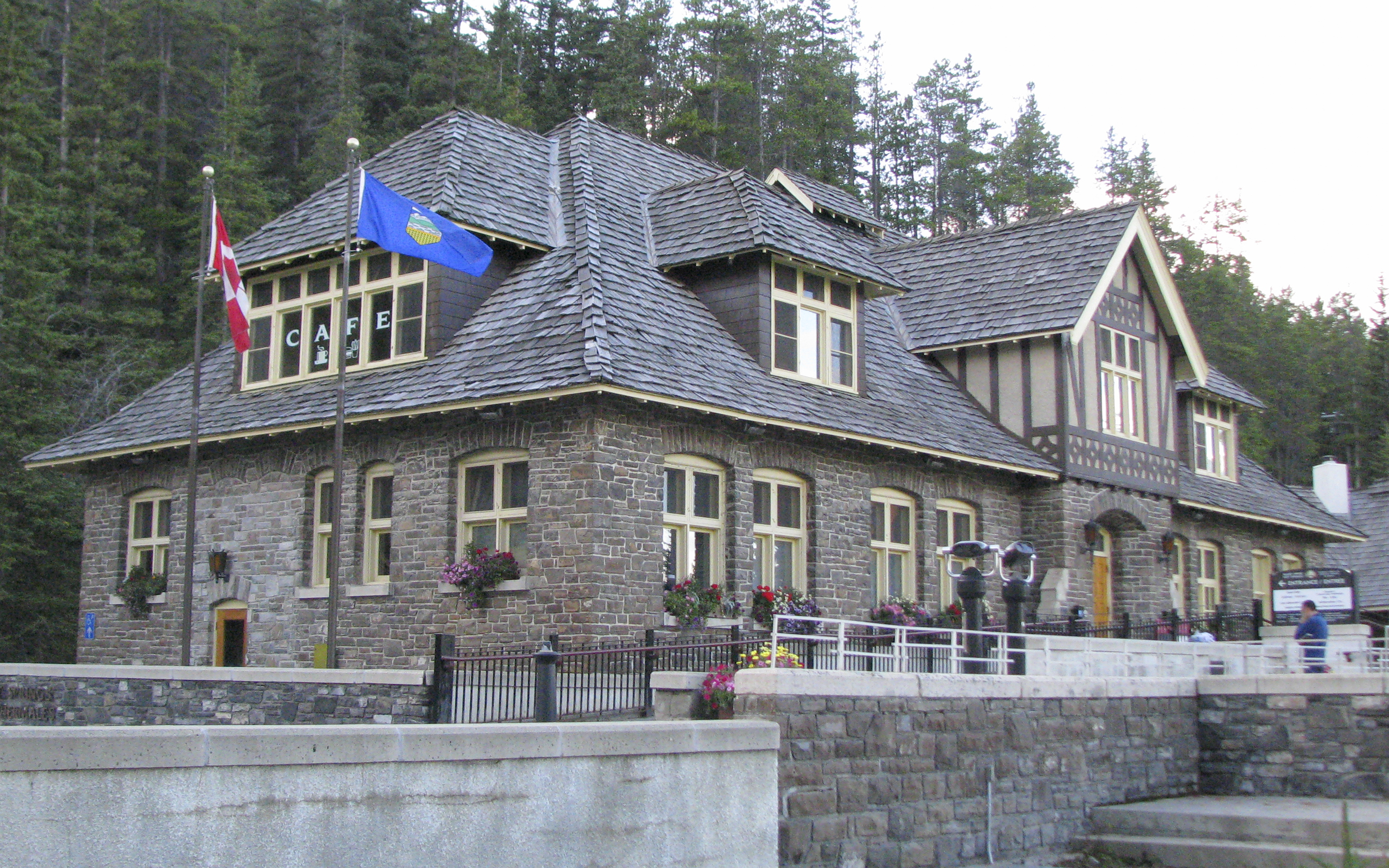
Entrance of building.

The Upper Hot Springs are one of nine naturally occurring hot springs in the Banff area. The hot spring water flows naturally through a big crack in the rock called the Sulphur Mountain Thrust Fault. The source of the water is located at higher elevations on either Sulphur Mountain or Mount Rundle. The springs are created by water passing through cracks in the mountain from Mount Rundle and Sulphur Mountain. As the water flows down the mountain it picks up heat and minerals. The flow rates fluctuates seasonally depending on when the snow melts. In the spring the water flows at over 900 litres per minute, which is the highest flow rate of the year. Highest water flows are in the spring and are lowest during the winter. Since the early 2000s, flow to the Upper Hot Springs has stopped for several months of the winter. During these times, municipal water is substituted for the recreational pools. Water temperature is kept at approximately 38 °C (100 °F), which is the hottest of the springs in the Banff area.

The Banff Springs snail is absent from the Upper Hot Springs region.

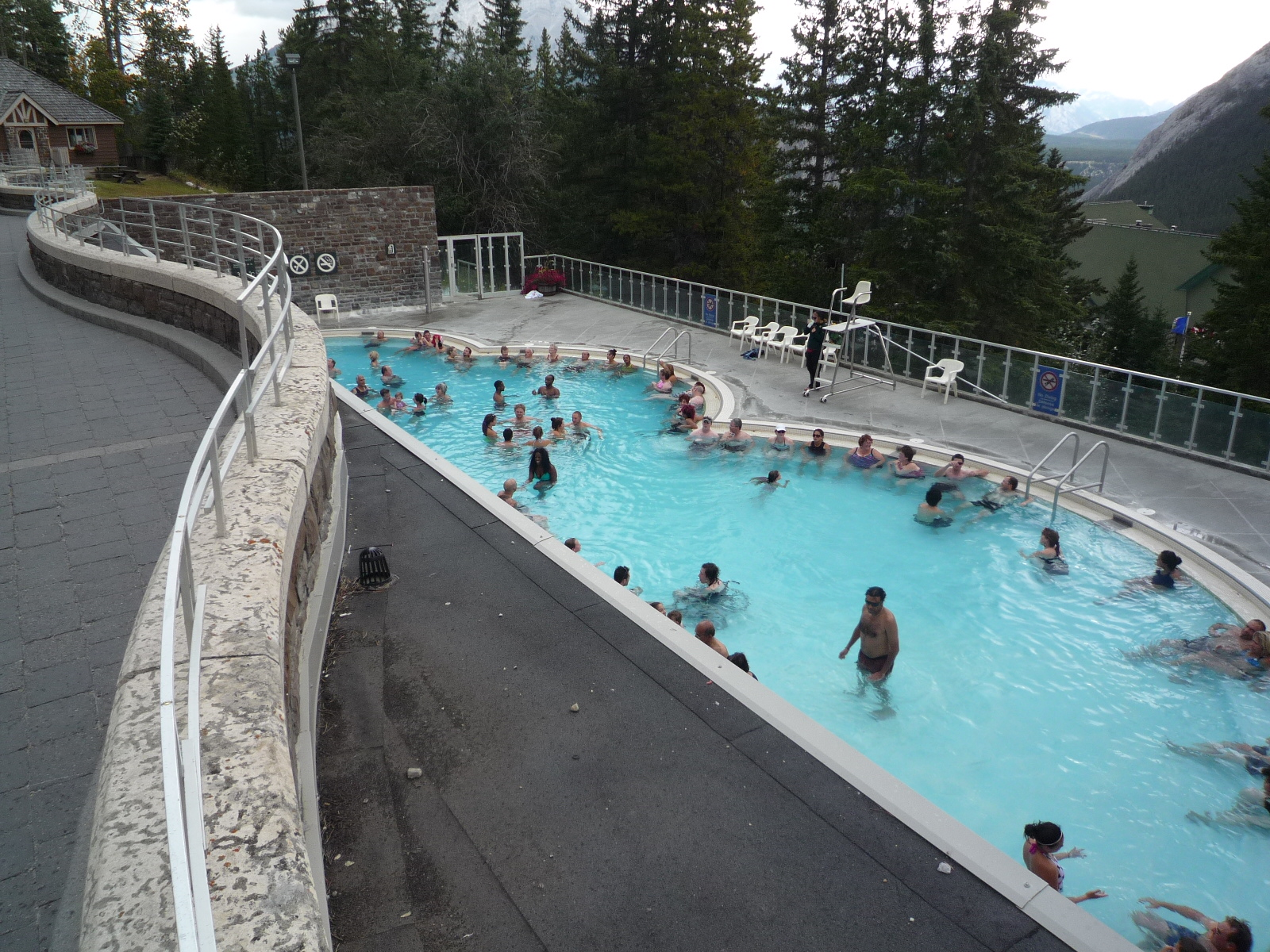
Pool area

== Water ==
Hot springs around the world are known for their mineral water and healing effects. Each hot spring around the world is unique to its blend of minerals, gases and temperature. Even all of the different hot springs in Banff have a different variations of mineral content and temperature.

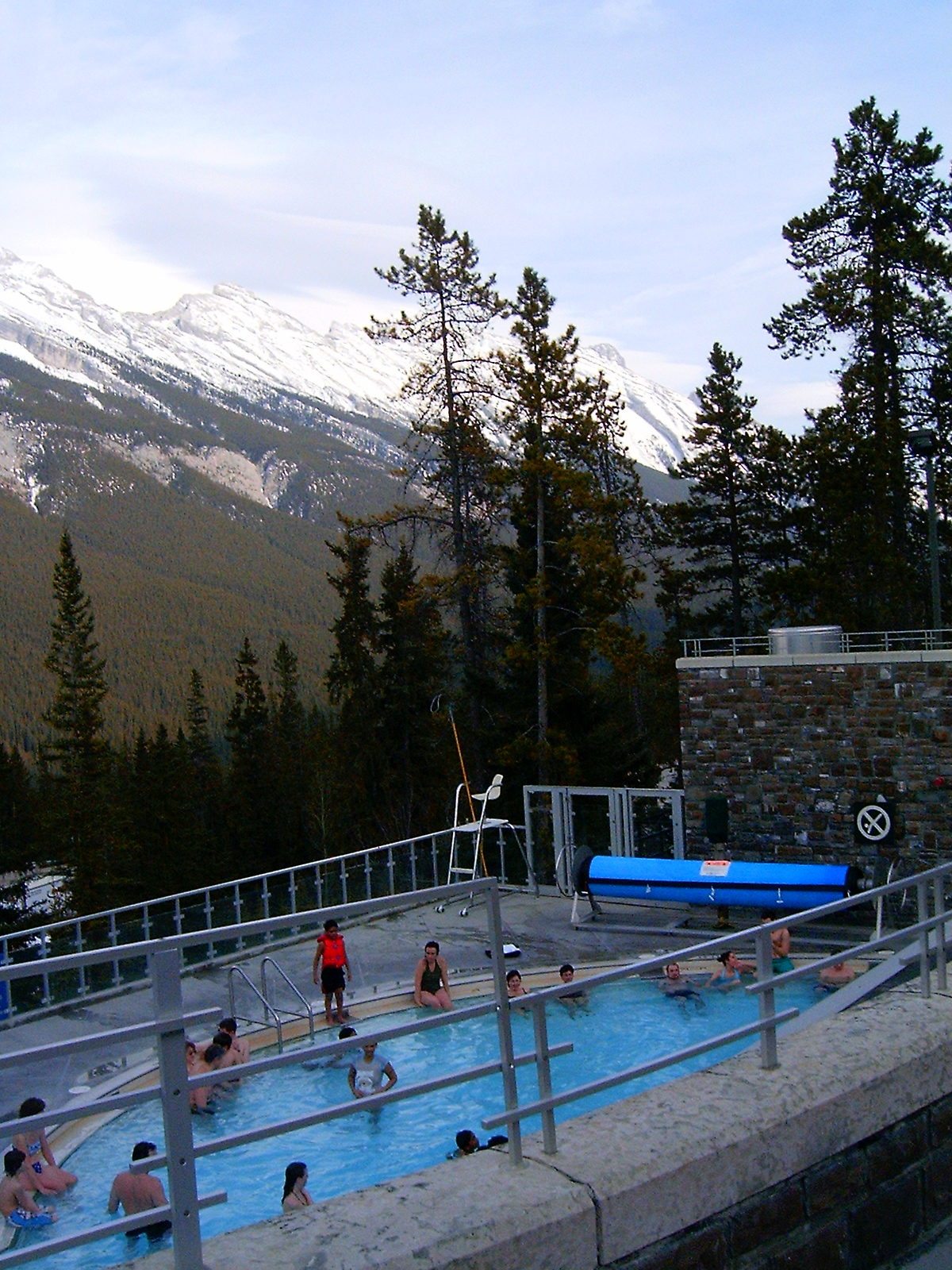
Pool area with mountain view

The minerals found in the Banff Upper Hot Springs are:

Mineral	Amount (mg/L)
Sulphate	572
Calcium	205
Bicarbonate	134
Magnesium	42
Sodium	6.6

== History ==
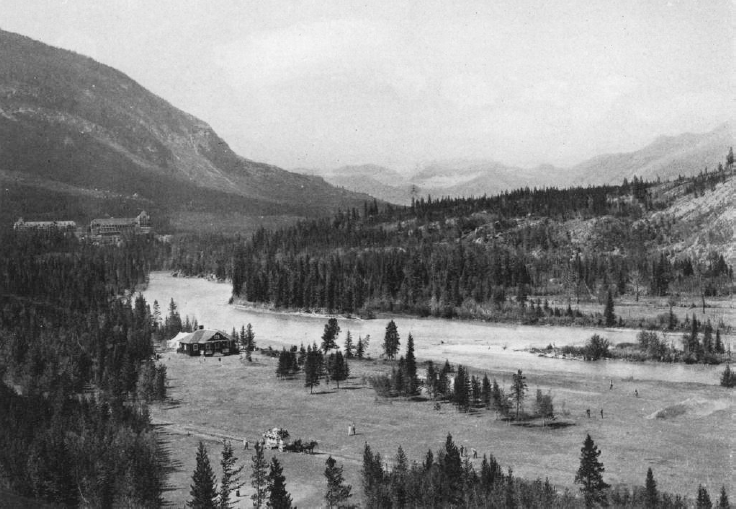
Banff in 1915

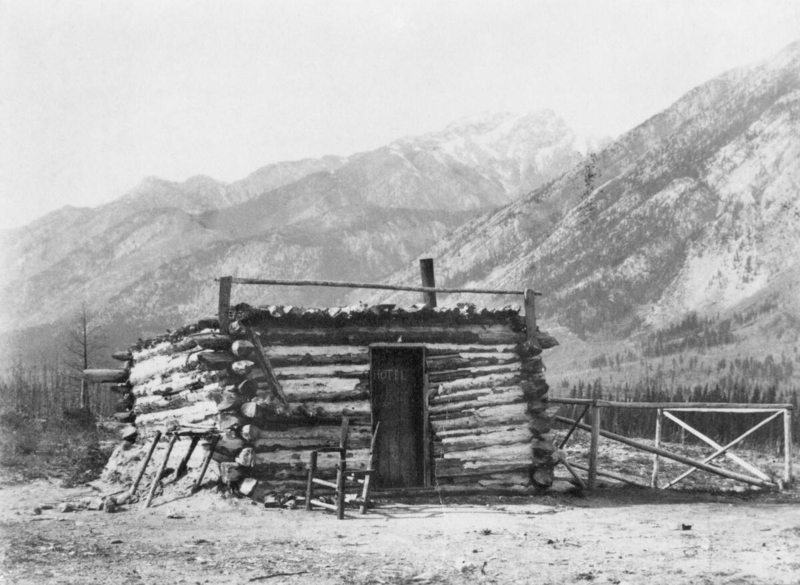
First hotel in Banff by Frank McCabe and brothers William and Tom McCardell at Banff Hot Springs, 1883

The hot springs were first found and extensively used by Indigenous Peoples including the Stoney Nakoda and Secwépemc, amongst others. The springs were used for healing and wellness and also served ceremonial purposes. The hot springs were first visited by Europeans in 1883, when Canadian Pacific Railway workers Frank McCabe and brothers William and Tom McCardell stumbled upon the springs. The party, recognizing the economic potential of the springs, quickly erected a fence around the opening to the springs and built a rough cabin which they operated as a "hotel" and used in an effort to claim ownership of the springs. Hot springs were popular in Europe and North America for health and wellness, with locales such as Bath, Leamington, and Hot Springs, Arkansas, being heavily patronized for their hot springs. McCabe and the McCardell's attempted to assert ownership over the hot springs, as did other parties, but the Canadian government opted to reserve the land as the Hot Springs Reserve in 1885. To further protect the springs from potential private ownership and to capitalize on their economic potential and that of the surrounding scenery, the Canadian government introduced the Rocky Mountains Park Act in 1887, creating Banff National Park, then called Rocky Mountains Park.

In 1886, the Grand View Villa, the first formal building constructed at the hot springs the Canadian government's approval, was established by Dr. Robert Gordon Brett. Following the establishment of Rocky Mountains Park, visitation to the springs increased exponentially, as did development at the site. The government started to create roads and paths to make it easier for tourists to travel to the area. In 1915 the Upper Hot Springs road was opened to motorists and now tourists could drive up to the site. In 1931 the Banff Upper Hot Springs bathhouse was declared a Registered Federal Heritage Building by the Government of Canada. Since then it has gone under many renovations to make it one of the most popular hot springs in its region, hosting to over 300,000 visitors annually.

== Renovations ==
The original building was a large building called the Grand View Villa, located to view the town of Banff. The first construction was in 1886 with upgrades to the Grand View Villa and construction of a log shack called a bathhouse. The Grand View Villa suffered from fires in 1901 and 1931 and had to be rebuilt both times. Today the Grand View Villa is known as the Grand View Hotel. In 1904 the Government of Canada did construction on the side of today's Rimrock Resort, adding two cement plunge basins, bath tubs and a swimming basin. After the 1931 fire, the government of Canada began to renovate the Upper Springs bathhouse. In 1932 the newly renovated bathhouse opened, with additions of sulphur water swimming pool, plunge baths, steam rooms, tubs, showers and dressing rooms. This renovation was an attempt by the government to modernize park facilities by adding luxury upgrades that would rival other international spas. In 1961 the large basin was reconstructed and the interior bathhouse was updated. In 1995 the bathhouse was renovated again and opened in 1996 with a new spa, restaurant and gift shop to keep up with all of the tourist activity.

== Tourism ==
The springs started to become popular in 1888 when tourists would travel to be able to relax and take in the health benefits in the hot mineral water. Tourists from all around the world would travel for the "cure" which they believed was in the water. Tourists would soak in the water and drink it as well. With the development of the Trans-Canada highway came the popularity of Banff national park. With Banff being a Canadian Hub for many outdoor activities, the Upper Hot Springs became more popular as a place to soak in the minerals soothe sore muscles. The Banff upper hot springs have always been popular but tourism has increased rapidly since the 2000s and it is estimated that over 300,000 people visit the springs every year.

== See also ==
Cave and Basin National Historic Site
