= Sulphur Mountain (Alberta) =

Mountain in Canada

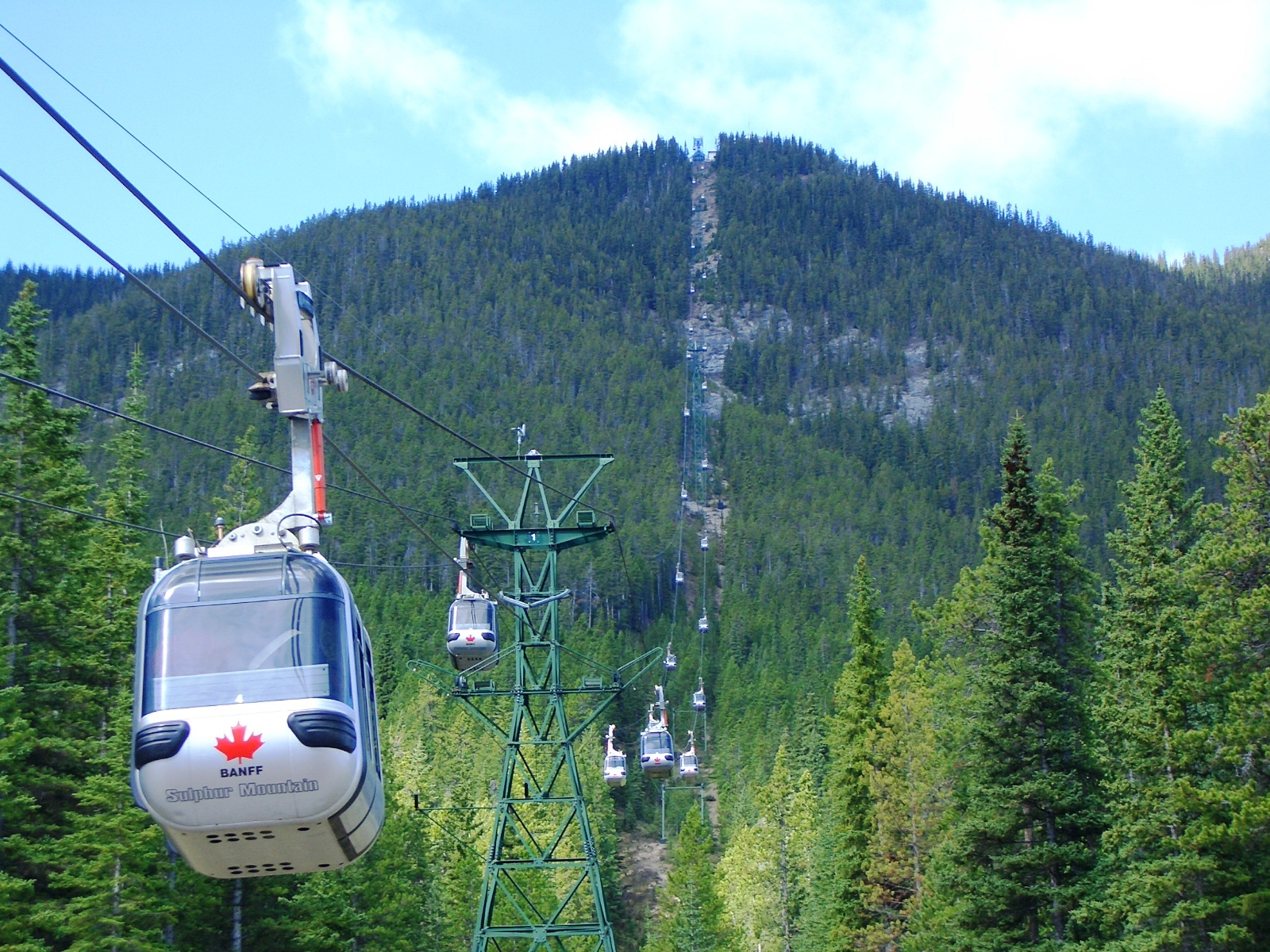
- The Gondola on Sulphur Mountain

Highest point
- Elevation: 2,451 m (8,041 ft)
- Prominence: 670 m (2,200 ft)
- Listing: Mountains of Alberta
- Coordinates: 51°07′25″N 115°33′21″W

Naming
- Native name: Mînî Rhuwîn (Stoney)

Geography
- Location within Alberta
- Interactive map of Sulphur Mountain
- Country: Canada
- Province: Alberta
- Protected area: Banff National Park
- Parent range: South Banff Range, Canadian Rockies
- Topo map: NTS 82O4 Banff

Climbing
- Easiest route: Walking trail Gondola lift/Hike for Sanson's Peak (2,256 m or 7,402 ft)

Sulphur Mountain (Nakoda: Mînî Rhuwîn) is a mountain in Banff National Park in the Canadian Rocky Mountains overlooking the town of Banff, Alberta, Canada.

The mountain was named in 1916 for the hot springs on its lower slopes. George Dawson had referred to this landform as Terrace Mountain on his 1886 map of the area. Sanson's Peak was named in 1948 for Norman Bethune Sanson who diligently attended the observatory recording equipment atop Sulphur Mountain for nearly 30 years.

== Recreation ==
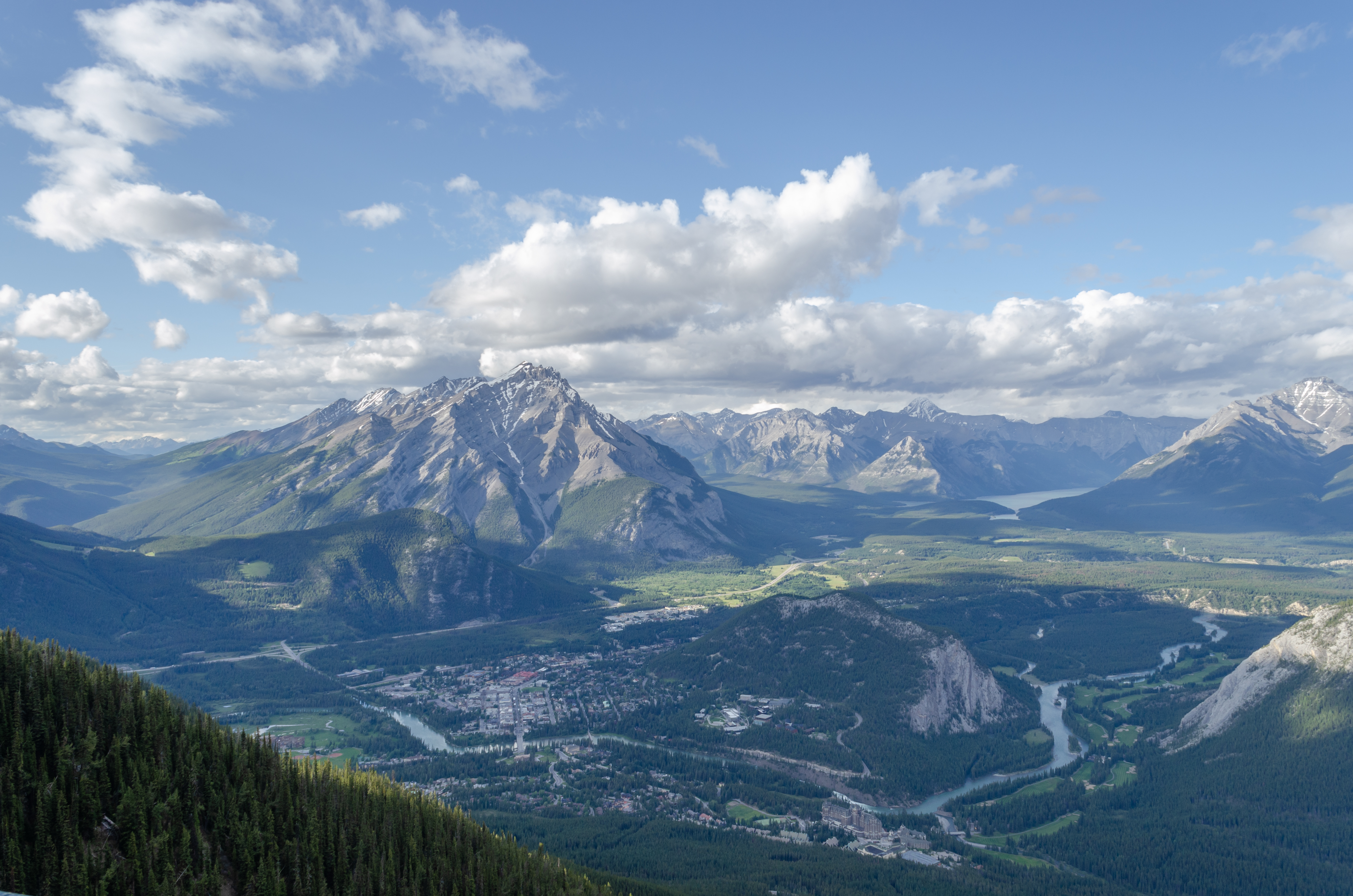
View from the summit of Sulphur Mountain, showing Banff and the surrounding areas

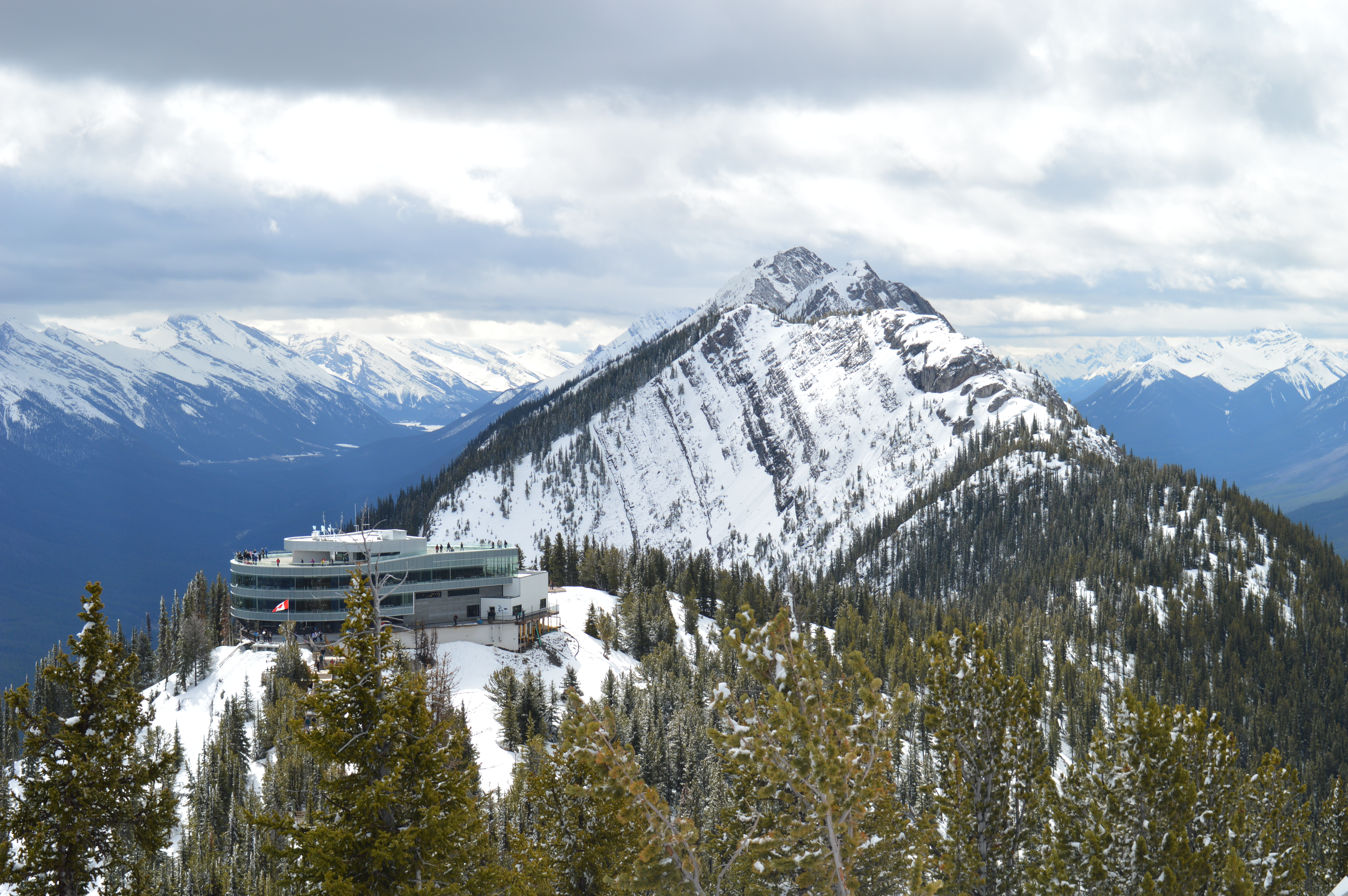
View from along the boardwalk on the top of Sulphur Mountain, showing the mountain top terminal and viewing deck.

Two hot springs have been commercially developed. The lowest is the Cave and Basin National Historic Site and the highest is the Banff Upper Hot Springs.

A gondola on the eastern slope goes to the summit ridge which has an upper terminal containing three restaurants, a gift shop, and multiple observation decks. The summit ridge provides views both westward up and east down the Bow Valley. A boardwalk can be followed on the north side to the top of Sanson's Peak (2,256 m or 7,402 ft).

The original, and more scenic, summit access is along an old fire road (Sanson Road) on the Southwest face of the mountain with a distance of 5.8 km from the Banff Sundance Canyon trail system near the Bow River. Another 5.4 km switchback trail route exists under the gondola with trailhead access from the Banff Hot Springs parking lot near the gondola terminal.

== Scientific importance ==
The mountain has been the site of two research facilities. In 1903, a meteorological observatory building was completed atop Sanson Peak. This building still exists and visitors can look through a window to see its interior complete with rustic furnishings. In the winter of 1956–57, the National Research Council built a small laboratory on Sanson's Peak in order to study cosmic rays as part of Canada's contribution to the International Geophysical Year (IGY). The Sulphur Mountain Cosmic Ray Station remained in operation until 1978 and the building was removed in 1981. A plaque now marks the site's location.

The hot springs at the base of Sulphur Mountain are home to the endangered Banff Springs snail and the now-extinct Banff longnose dace.

== Gallery ==
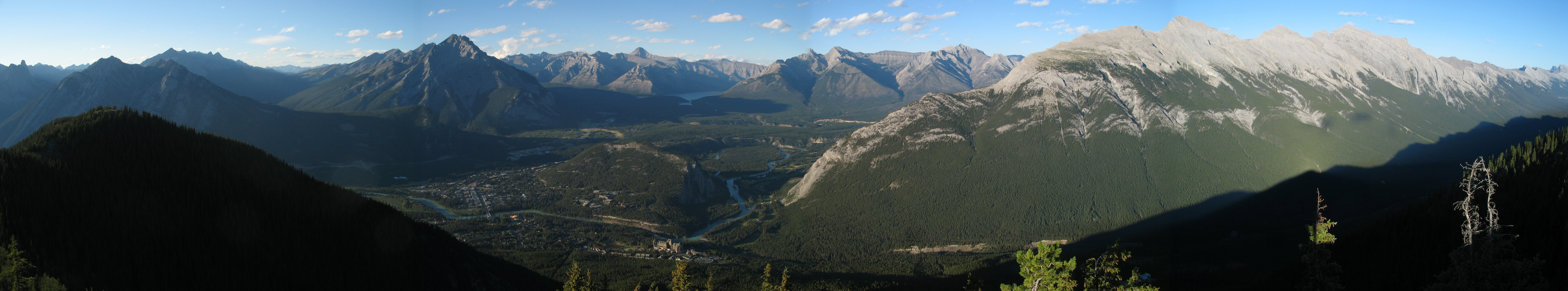
The view from the summit of Sulphur Mountain

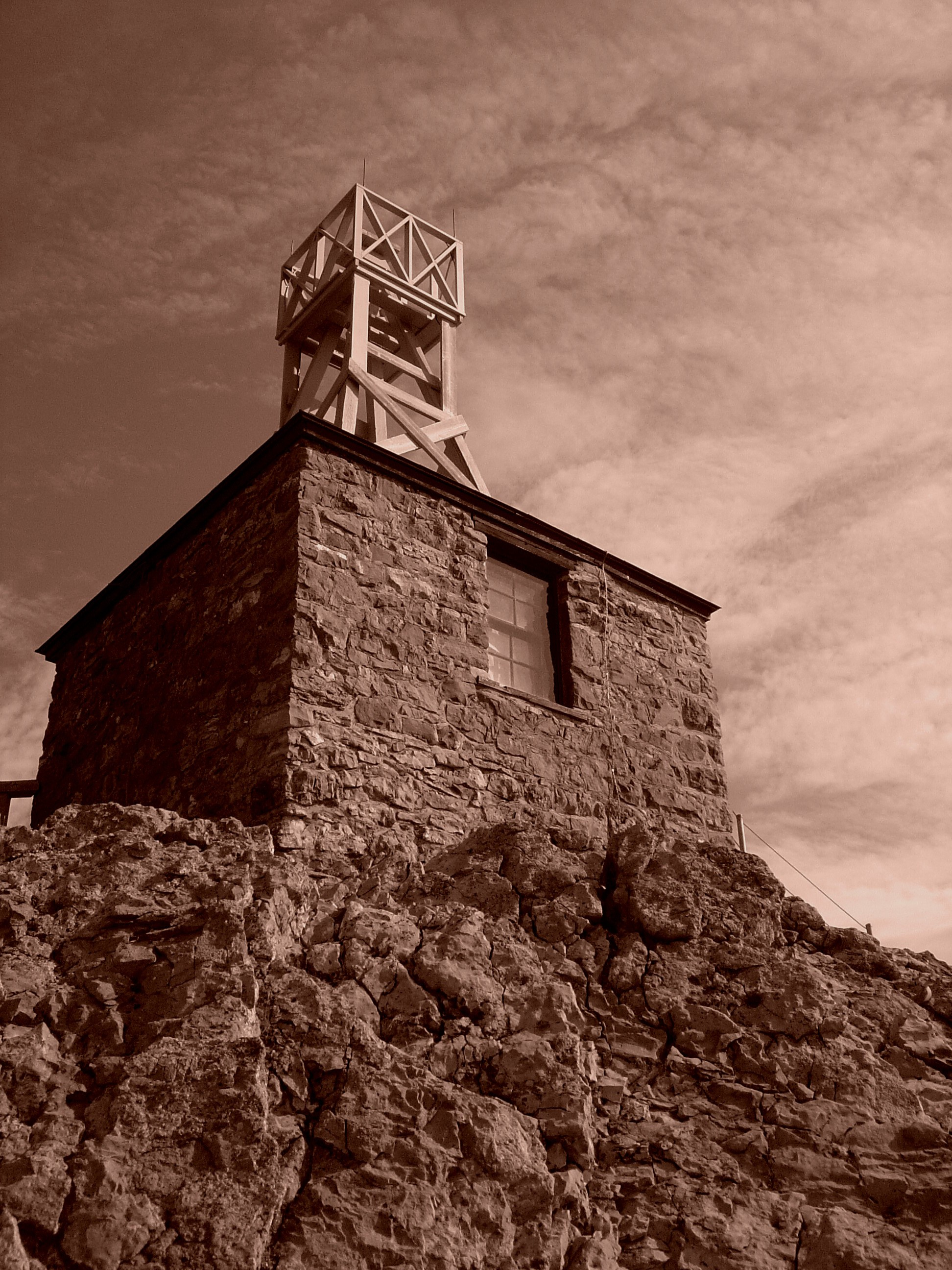
Meteorological observatory building

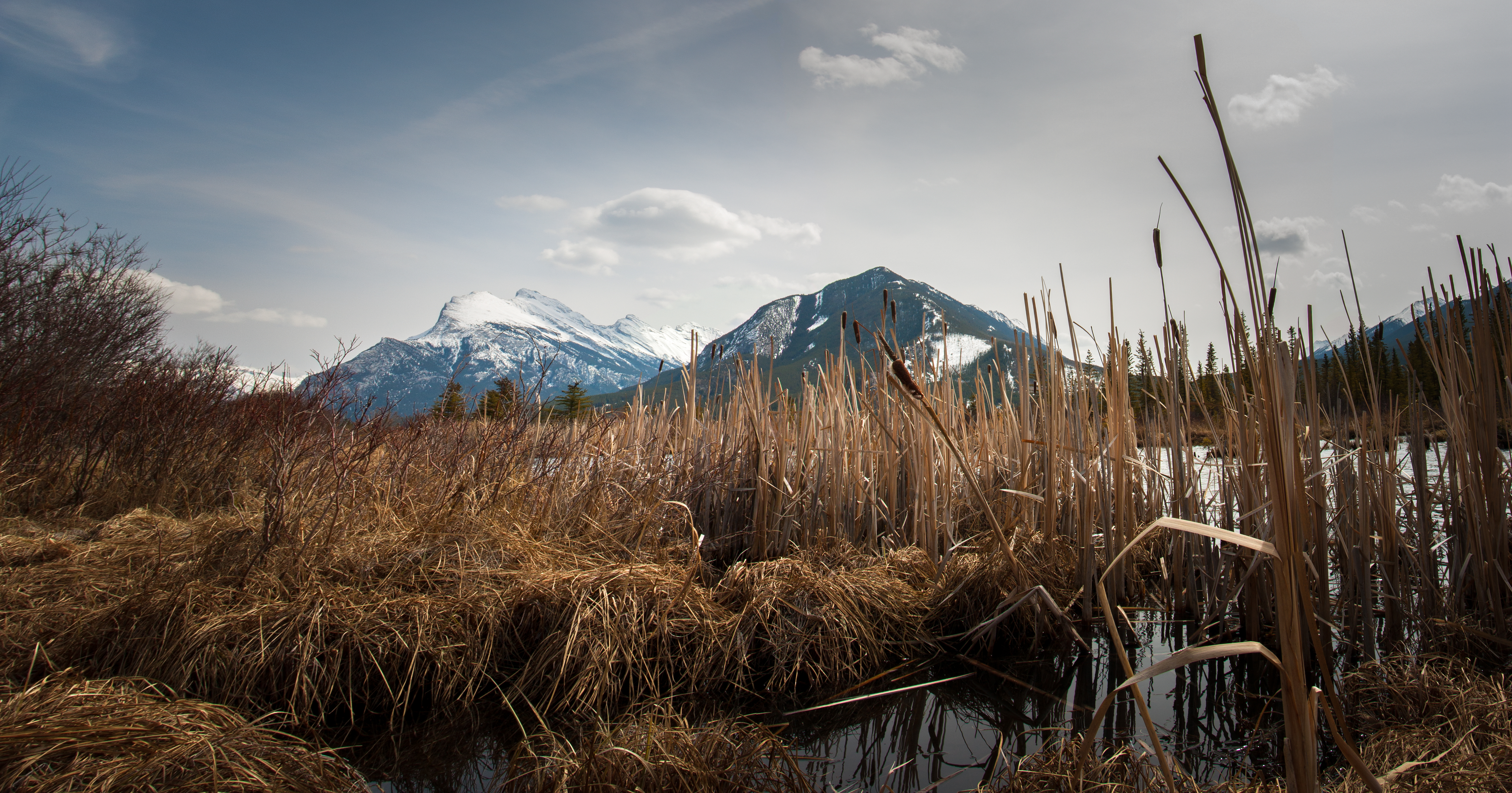
Mount Rundle and Sulphur Mountain as seen from the reeds along the shore of one of the Vermillion Lakes in Banff National Park, Alberta, Canada
