= Banff, Alberta =

Town in Canada

Banff
- Town
- Town of Banff
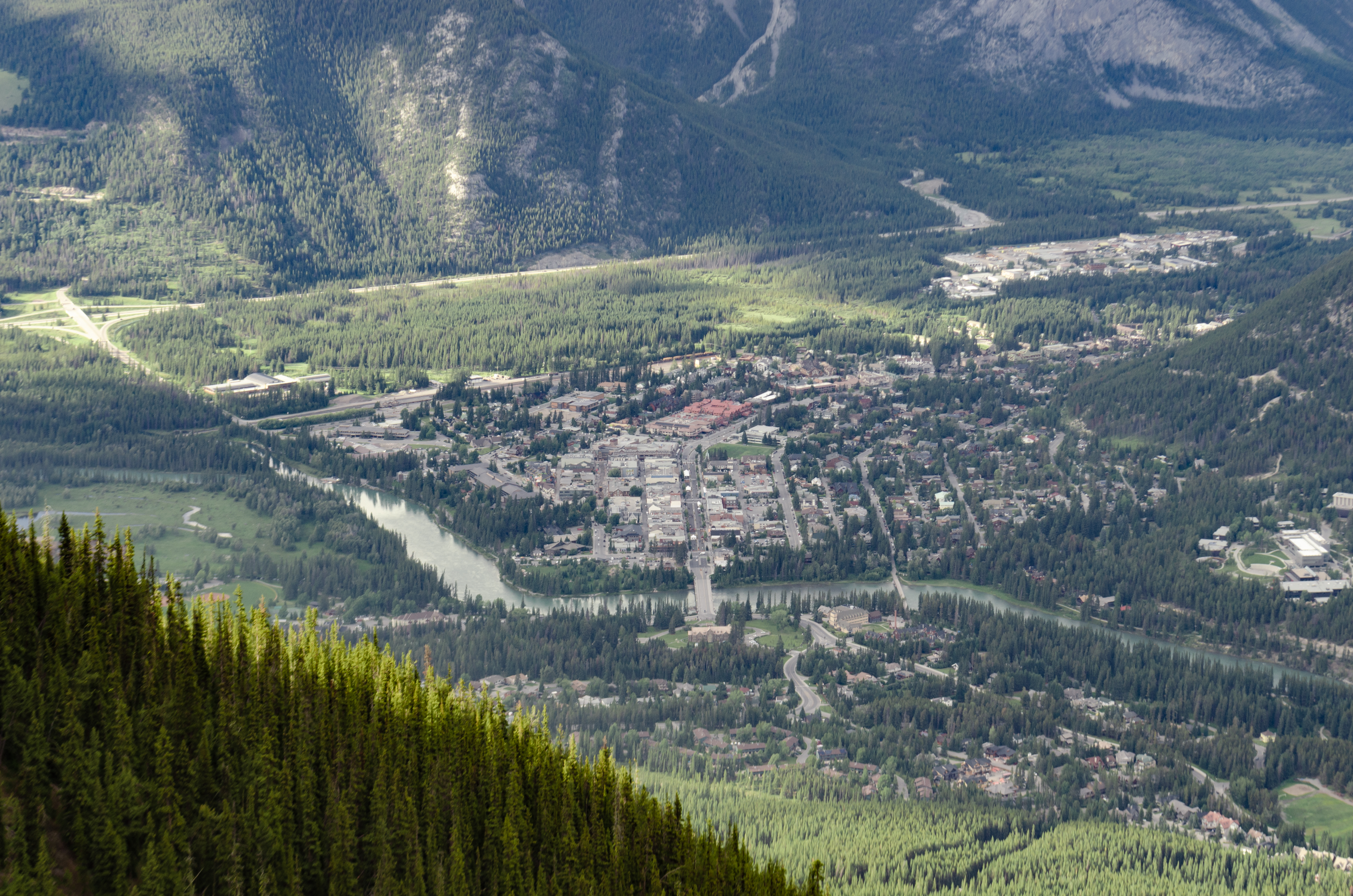
- View of Banff

- Flag Logo

- Location within Banff National Park

- Location of Banff in Alberta
- Coordinates: 51°10′40″N 115°34′25″W
- Country: Canada
- Province: Alberta
- Region: Alberta's Rockies
- Census division: 15
- Improvement district: Improvement District No. 9
- Founded: 1885
- Incorporated
  - Town: January 1, 1990
- Named for: Banff, Aberdeenshire

Government
  - Mayor: Corrie DiManno
  - Governing body: Banff Town Council: Barb Pelham; Kaylee Ram; Grant Canning; Cheryl “Chip” Olver; Ted Christensen; Hugh Pettigrew
  - Manager: Kelly Gibson
  - MP (Yellowhead): William Stevenson
  - MLA (Banff-Kananaskis): Sarah Elmeligi

Area (2021)
  - Land: 4.08 km^{2} (1.58 sq mi)
- Elevation: 1,400 m (4,600 ft)

Population (2021)
  - Total: 8,305
  - Density: 2,033.8/km^{2} (5,268/sq mi)
- Demonym: Banffite
- Time zone: UTC−06:00 (Alberta Time)
- Forward sortation area: T1L
- Area codes: +1-403, +1-587
- Waterways: Bow River
- Public transit service: Roam
- Website: www.banff.ca

Banff is a resort town in Banff National Park, Alberta, Canada, in Alberta's Rockies along the Trans-Canada Highway, 126 km (78 mi) west of Calgary, 58 km (36 mi) east of Lake Louise, and 1,400 to 1,630 m (4,590 to 5,350 ft) above sea level.

Banff was the first municipality to incorporate within a Canadian national park. The town is a member of the Calgary Regional Partnership.

Banff is one of Canada's most popular tourist destinations. Known for its mountainous surroundings and hot springs, it is a destination for outdoor sports and hiking, biking, scrambling and skiing. Sunshine Village, Ski Norquay and Lake Louise Ski Resort are nearby ski resorts within the national park.

== Toponymy ==
The area was named Banff in 1884 by George Stephen, president of the Canadian Pacific Railway, recalling his birthplace near Banff, Scotland. The Canadian Pacific built a series of grand hotels along the rail line and advertised the Banff Springs Hotel as an international tourist resort.

== History ==
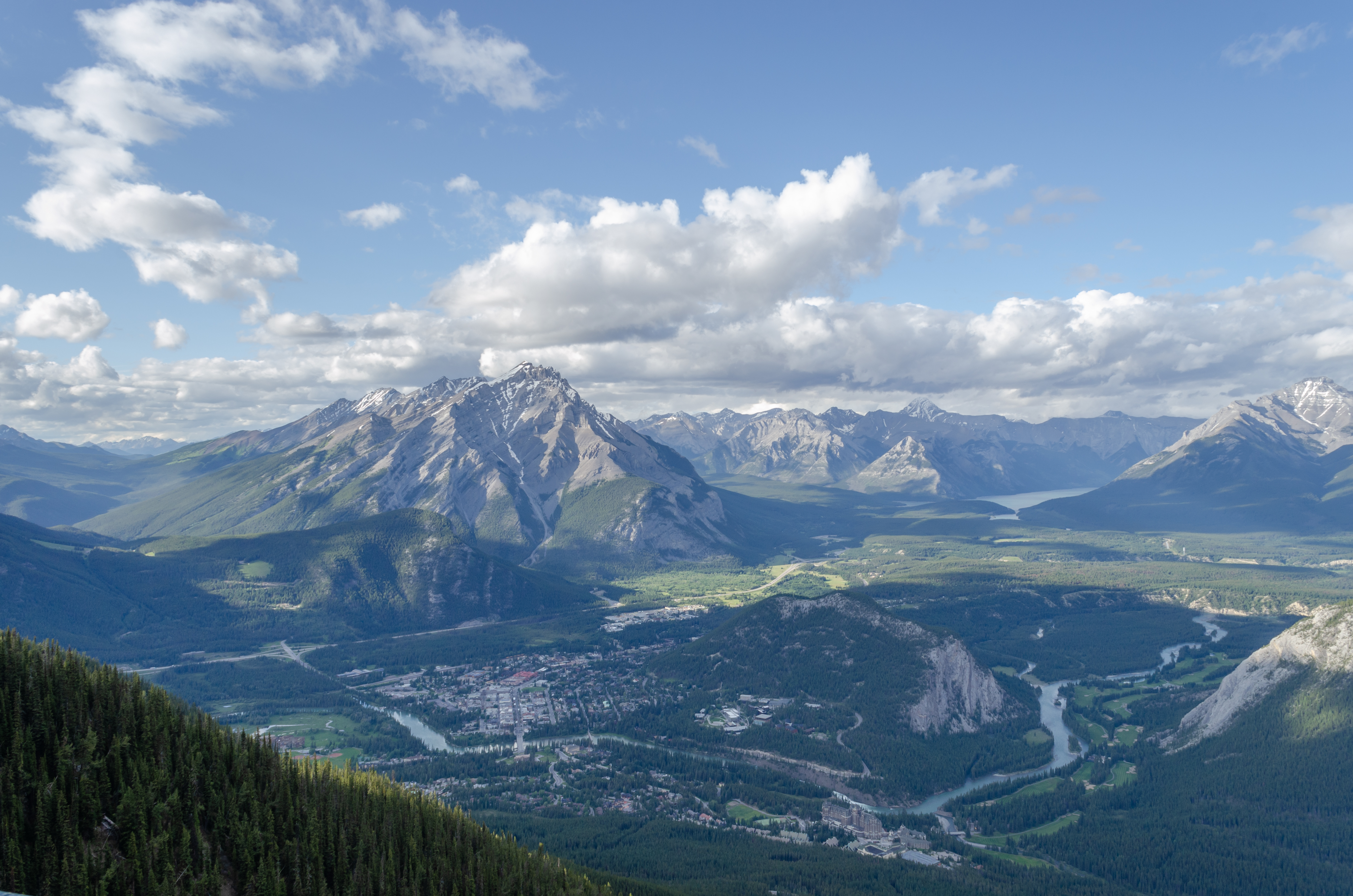
View from the summit of Sulphur Mountain, showing Banff and the surrounding areas

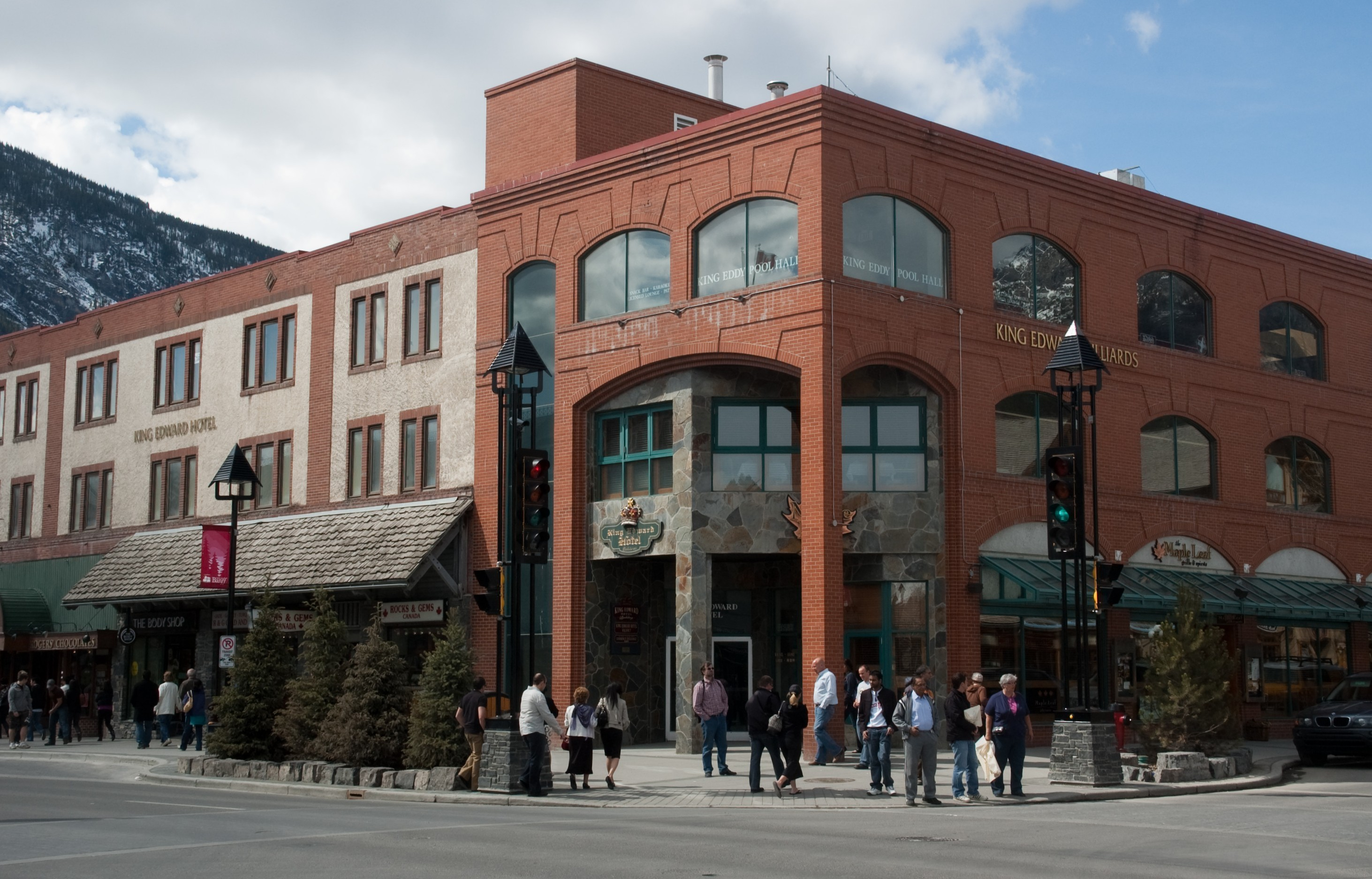
King Edward Hotel

The site of Banff has been continually inhabited by First Nations for at least 10,000 years. The town's location was the site of an Interior Salishan settlement, which was both a wintering village and a trading post. Nakoda and Blackfoot peoples have also, at various points, lived at and near the present location. The town of Banff was first established in the 1880s after the transcontinental railway was built through the Bow Valley. In 1883, three Canadian Pacific Railway workers stumbled upon a series of natural hot springs on the side of Sulphur Mountain. In 1885, Canada established a federal reserve of 26 km^{2} (10 sq mi) around the Cave and Basin hot springs and began promoting the area as an international resort and spa as a way to support the new railway. In 1887, the reserve area was increased to 673 km^{2} (260 sq mi) and named "Rocky Mountain Park". This was the beginning of Canada's National Park system.

The Banff townsite was developed near the railway station as a service centre for tourists visiting the park. Services, such as St George-in-the-Pines church, were constructed through the late 19th century. It was administered by the Government of Canada's national parks system until 1990 when the Town of Banff became the only incorporated municipality within a Canadian national park.

An internment camp was set up at Banff and Castle Mountain in Dominion Park from July 1915 to July 1917, mostly imprisoning Ukrainian immigrants. Designated enemy aliens under Canada's 1914 War Measures Act, enemy aliens were interned during World War I as prisoners of war. The prisoners of the internment camp were used to build the infrastructure of the national park.

In 1985, the United Nations declared Banff National Park, as one of the Canadian Rocky Mountain Parks, a UNESCO world heritage site. In 1976, the International Astronomical Union's Working Group for Planetary System Nomenclature (IAU/WGPSN) adopted the name Banff for a crater on Mars, after the town in Alberta. The crater is at latitude 17.7° north and longitude 30.8° west. Its diameter is 5 km (3.1 mi).

In 1991, Banff hosted the 1991 Winter Deaflympics, the first and only year that the Deaflympics was hosted in Canada.

In response to the COVID-19 pandemic, the town temporarily closed portions of its main street to vehicle traffic to create a downtown pedestrian zone. The Banff Town Council said the pedestrian zone would stay in effect until at least 2023.

== Geography ==
The town is surrounded by mountains, notably Mount Rundle, Sulphur Mountain, Mount Norquay, and Cascade Mountain, and is situated above Bow Falls near the confluence of the Bow River and Spray River. Soils are calcareous and usually imperfectly to poorly drained in their natural state with textures from very fine sandy loam to silty clay loam.

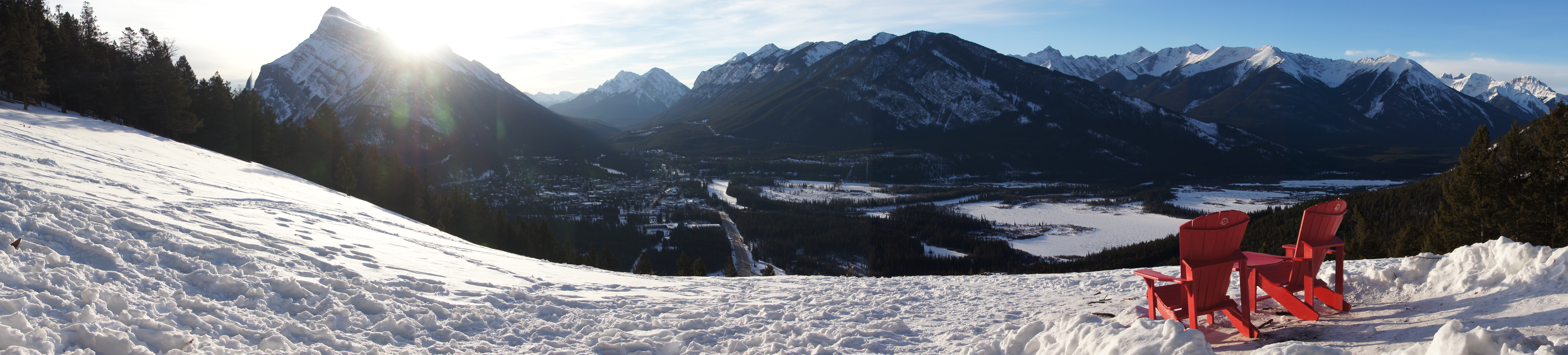
The sun rises over Banff from a vantage point on the road to Mount Norquay

=== Climate ===
Banff experiences a subarctic climate (Köppen climate classification Dfc) that borders on a humid continental climate (Köppen Dfb). Winter temperatures range from an average low of −13.5 °C (7.7 °F) to an average high of −0.5 °C (31.1 °F). Summer temperatures in the warmest month are an average high of 22.5 °C (72.5 °F) and an average low of 6.8 °C (44.2 °F). Snow has been recorded in all months of the year. The annual snowfall averages 183.8 cm (72.4 in). The highest temperature ever recorded was 37.8 °C (100 °F) on June 29, 2021, during the 2021 Western North America heat wave.

Climate data for Banff Climate ID: 3050520; coordinates 51°11′N 115°34′W; elevation: 1,383.7 m (4,540 ft); 1991–2020 normals, extremes 1887−present
Month	Jan	Feb	Mar	Apr	May	Jun	Jul	Aug	Sep	Oct	Nov	Dec	Year
Record high humidex	12.2	13.9	19.2	24.4	29.0	31.6	33.4	34.0	30.4	24.2	15.9	12.2	34.0
Record high °C (°F)	12.3 (54.1)	14.7 (58.5)	20.0 (68.0)	25.6 (78.1)	29.4 (84.9)	37.8 (100.0)	35.6 (96.1)	34.2 (93.6)	31.0 (87.8)	26.5 (79.7)	16.5 (61.7)	12.5 (54.5)	37.8 (100.0)
Mean daily maximum °C (°F)	−3.5 (25.7)	−0.5 (31.1)	3.7 (38.7)	9.0 (48.2)	14.3 (57.7)	17.9 (64.2)	22.5 (72.5)	22.1 (71.8)	16.7 (62.1)	9.1 (48.4)	0.6 (33.1)	−4.6 (23.7)	8.9 (48.0)
Daily mean °C (°F)	−8.5 (16.7)	−6.6 (20.1)	−2.2 (28.0)	2.8 (37.0)	7.4 (45.3)	11.2 (52.2)	14.7 (58.5)	14.0 (57.2)	9.4 (48.9)	3.4 (38.1)	−3.8 (25.2)	−9.0 (15.8)	2.7 (36.9)
Mean daily minimum °C (°F)	−13.5 (7.7)	−12.6 (9.3)	−8.2 (17.2)	−3.5 (25.7)	0.5 (32.9)	4.4 (39.9)	6.8 (44.2)	5.8 (42.4)	2.2 (36.0)	−2.4 (27.7)	−8.2 (17.2)	−13.4 (7.9)	−3.5 (25.7)
Record low °C (°F)	−51.2 (−60.2)	−45.0 (−49.0)	−40.6 (−41.1)	−27.2 (−17.0)	−17.8 (0.0)	−4.1 (24.6)	−3.2 (26.2)	−4.5 (23.9)	−16.7 (1.9)	−27.0 (−16.6)	−40.6 (−41.1)	−48.3 (−54.9)	−51.2 (−60.2)
Record low wind chill	−52.1	−49.1	−41.8	−37.0	−21.1	−5.7	−3.6	−4.3	−14.4	−30.5	−43.1	−50.6	−52.1
Average precipitation mm (inches)	18.8 (0.74)	18.6 (0.73)	29.3 (1.15)	39.2 (1.54)	50.0 (1.97)	73.3 (2.89)	46.9 (1.85)	46.9 (1.85)	44.9 (1.77)	35.8 (1.41)	27.8 (1.09)	22.5 (0.89)	454.0 (17.87)
Average rainfall mm (inches)	1.6 (0.06)	0.9 (0.04)	6.6 (0.26)	15.0 (0.59)	37.9 (1.49)	72.5 (2.85)	46.7 (1.84)	49.0 (1.93)	39.9 (1.57)	18.7 (0.74)	5.5 (0.22)	1.3 (0.05)	295.7 (11.64)
Average snowfall cm (inches)	21.2 (8.3)	20.3 (8.0)	25.3 (10.0)	30.0 (11.8)	12.3 (4.8)	1.7 (0.7)	0.1 (0.0)	0.2 (0.1)	7.9 (3.1)	16.7 (6.6)	25.2 (9.9)	23.0 (9.1)	183.8 (72.4)
Average precipitation days (≥ 0.2 mm)	10.2	10.0	13.1	13.3	14.0	16.6	13.6	13.2	11.7	11.2	11.1	10.8	148.9
Average rainy days (≥ 0.2 mm)	0.59	0.60	2.6	4.7	12.3	16.5	12.8	12.8	10.2	6.9	2.0	1.1	83.0
Average snowy days (≥ 0.2 cm)	9.3	8.3	9.4	8.4	3.1	0.29	0.06	0.18	1.4	4.9	9.3	8.8	63.4
Average relative humidity (%) (at 1500 LST)	63.1	50.2	45.4	41.4	42.4	44.8	36.5	37.1	43.8	48.0	61.4	66.0	48.4
Mean monthly sunshine hours	58.9	93.2	127.1	159.0	201.5	207.0	254.2	213.9	171.0	130.2	81.0	43.4	1,740.4
Mean daily sunshine hours	1.9	3.3	4.1	5.3	6.5	6.9	8.2	6.9	5.7	4.2	2.7	1.4	4.8
Source: Environment and Climate Change Canada; June maximum; July maximum; sun, 1948–1970

== Demographics ==
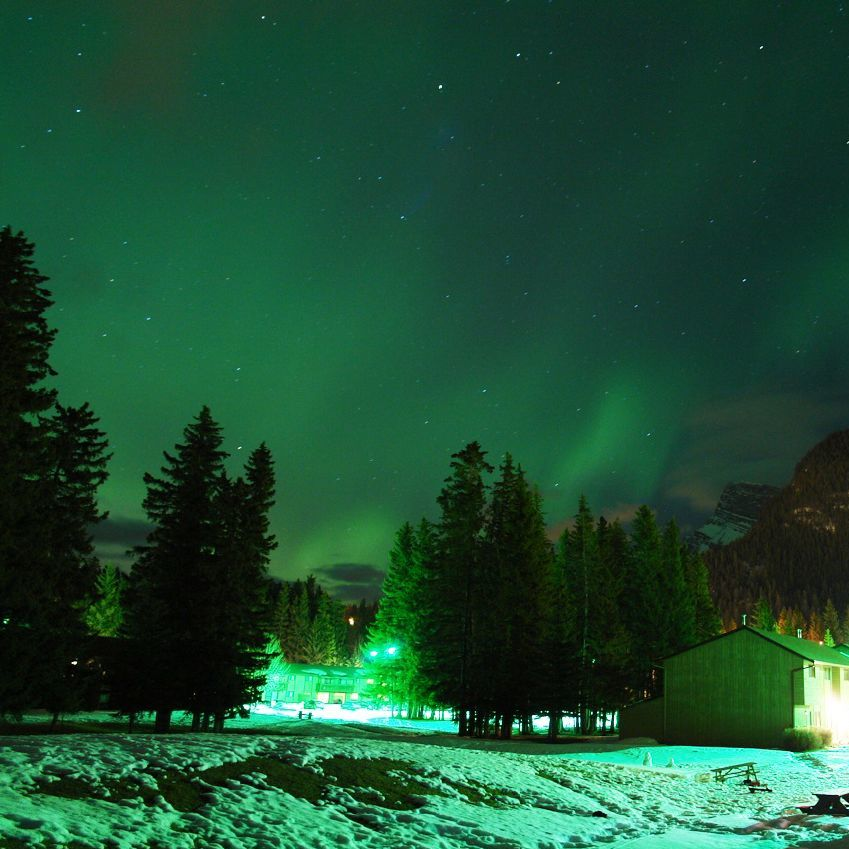
Northern lights over Banff

In the 2021 Canadian census conducted by Statistics Canada, the Town of Banff had a population of 8,305 living in 2,930 of its 3,287 total private dwellings, a change of 5.8% from its 2016 population of 7,851. With a land area of 4.08 km^{2} (1.58 sq mi), it had a population density of 2,035.5/km^{2} in 2021.

The population of the Town of Banff according to its 2017 municipal census is 8,875, an increase of 5.4% from its 2014 municipal census population of 8,421.

In the Canada 2016 Census conducted by Statistics Canada, the Town of Banff recorded a population of 7,851 living in 2,543 of its 2,729 total private dwellings, a 3.5% change from its 2011 population of 7,584. With a land area of 4.77 km^{2} (1.84 sq mi), Banff had a population density of 1,645.9/km^{2} in 2016.

Parks Canada enforces requirements that individuals must meet to reside in the town, in order "to ensure that a broad supply of housing types are available for those who work and raise families in the community".

Panethnic groups in the Town of Banff (1991−2021)
Panethnic group	2021		2016		2011		2006		2001		1996		1991	
Panethnic group	Pop.	%	Pop.	%	Pop.	%	Pop.	%	Pop.	%	Pop.	%	Pop.	%
European (Note: Statistic includes all persons that did not make up part of a visible minority or an indigenous identity.)	4,890	71.33%	4,730	73.5%	4,675	74.86%	5,460	81.98%	5,705	80.35%	5,110	84.05%	4,840	85.44%
Southeast Asian (Note: Statistic includes total responses of "Filipino" and "Southeast Asian" under visible minority section on census.)	620	9.04%	460	7.15%	560	8.97%	210	3.15%	100	1.41%	160	2.63%	60	1.06%
East Asian (Note: Statistic includes total responses of "Chinese", "Korean", and "Japanese" under visible minority section on census.)	605	8.83%	760	11.81%	735	11.77%	680	10.21%	850	11.97%	500	8.22%	530	9.36%
South Asian	220	3.21%	175	2.72%	25	0.4%	85	1.28%	40	0.56%	90	1.48%	30	0.53%
Indigenous	215	3.14%	130	2.02%	185	2.96%	85	1.28%	165	2.32%	80	1.32%	135	2.38%
Latin American	100	1.46%	70	1.09%	25	0.4%	65	0.98%	110	1.55%	60	0.99%	40	0.71%
African	75	1.09%	75	1.17%	15	0.24%	55	0.83%	75	1.06%	60	0.99%	10	0.18%
Middle Eastern (Note: Statistic includes total responses of "West Asian" and "Arab" under visible minority section on census.)	10	0.15%	10	0.16%	0	0%	0	0%	45	0.63%	10	0.16%	20	0.35%
Other/multiracial (Note: Statistic includes total responses of "Visible minority, n.i.e." and "Multiple visible minorities" under visible minority section on census.)	110	1.6%	40	0.62%	15	0.24%	25	0.38%	25	0.35%	10	0.16%	—N/a	—N/a
Total responses	6,855	82.54%	6,435	81.96%	6,245	82.34%	6,660	99.4%	7,100	99.51%	6,080	99.7%	5,665	99.6%
Total population	8,305	100%	7,851	100%	7,584	100%	6,700	100%	7,135	100%	6,098	100%	5,688	100%
Note: Totals greater than 100% due to multiple origin responses

== Attractions ==
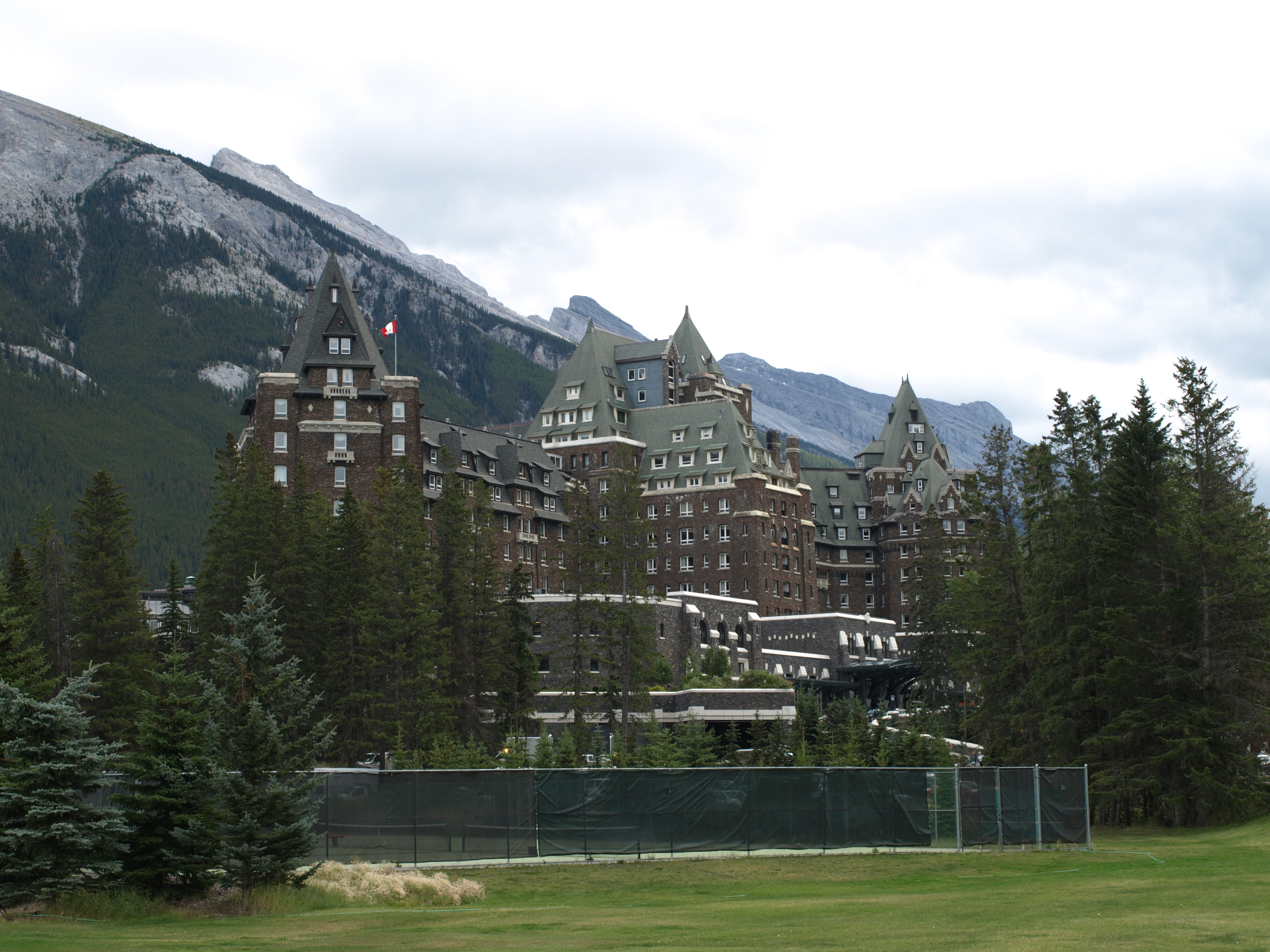
Fairmont Banff Springs Hotel in 2008

Several mountains are located immediately adjacent to the townsite, including Mount Rundle (2,949 m (9,675 ft)); Cascade Mountain (2,998 m (9,836 ft)); and Mount Norquay (2,134 m (7,001 ft)). Mount Norquay has a ski slope as well as mountain biking trails on the Stoney Squaw portion, and Via Ferrata (an assisted climbing experience). A tourist attraction, the Banff Gondola, is available to ascend Sulphur Mountain (2,281 m (7,484 ft)) where a boardwalk (Banff Skywalk) beginning from the upper terminal connects to Sanson Peak. Sulphur Mountain is also the location of the Banff Upper Hot Springs.

Lake Minnewanka located six minutes north of the townsite is a day-use area with a variety of activities. Mountain biking, hiking, and fishing are allowed in this part of the park. A Lake Cruise, motor boat rentals, and a small food concession are available at the marina.

Tunnel Mountain (formerly known as Sleeping Buffalo Mountain) (1,690 m (5,540 ft)) is situated within the townsite and has a summit that can be scaled in less than half an hour. It was named Tunnel Mountain because surveyors initially wanted to make a tunnel for the Canadian Pacific Railway right through the mountain, instead of following the Bow River Valley. Located on the side of Tunnel Mountain is the Banff Centre for Arts and Creativity, which hosts events, including outdoor concerts, dance, opera, and theatre.

Banff is home to the Banff World Television Festival, Banff Mountain Film Festival, Rocky Mountain Music Festival, and Bike Fest. The town is also the starting point of the 4,417 km (2,745 mi) Great Divide Mountain Bike Route, which terminates at Antelope Wells, New Mexico in the United States.

== Sports ==
Banff and nearby Canmore played host to the 2014 Alberta Winter Games.

Banff also hosted the 1991 Winter Deaflympics.

For several years there has been an annual long-distance relay run between Banff and Jasper, Alberta (formerly known as the Jasper to Banff Relay).

Banff has a long history of hosting Team Canada hockey training camps, including Canada's 2012 World Junior Ice Hockey Championships team when the event was held in Alberta and the 1984 Canada Cup squad which practiced there, before the start of the tournament.

== Infrastructure ==
=== Transportation ===
Banff railway station

In June 2008, the Banff council launched a local bus system called Roam, with three routes connecting the town, Tunnel Mountain, the Banff Springs Hotel, and the Banff Gondola. The service is operated using four hybrid Nova buses, each decorated with scenes from the National Park.

Many bus stops along the routes have screens that tell passengers exactly how many minutes before the next two buses arrive. In December 2012, the bus system was expanded to include the hourly Route 3 service between Banff and Canmore.

As of January 2024, Roam Transit offers 10 routes, the majority serving destinations within Banff or to national park locations nearby. In addition, Roam also offers two routes to Lake Louise, as well as a local service route within Canmore.

The railway came to Banff when the Canadian Pacific Railway (CPR) line from Calgary opened in 1883. The current station building was opened by the CPR in 1910, and was declared a heritage railway station by the Canadian federal government in 1991.

Via Rail long-distance trains no longer serve Banff, but the railway station remains in use by the Rocky Mountaineer and Royal Canadian Pacific tour trains.

The nearest airport to Banff with major service is the Calgary International Airport in Calgary.

=== Health care ===
Acute health care is provided at the Banff – Mineral Springs Hospital.

== Notable people ==
- Karen Percy, double-bronze medal skier at the 1988 Winter Olympics
- Kevin Smyth, former NHL player
- Ryan Smyth, former NHL player

== See also ==
- Banff Centre for Arts and Creativity
- Banff International Research Station (BIRS)
- List of communities in Canada by elevation
- List of francophone communities in Alberta
