= Roam (public transit) =

Public transit system in the Bow Valley of Alberta, Canada

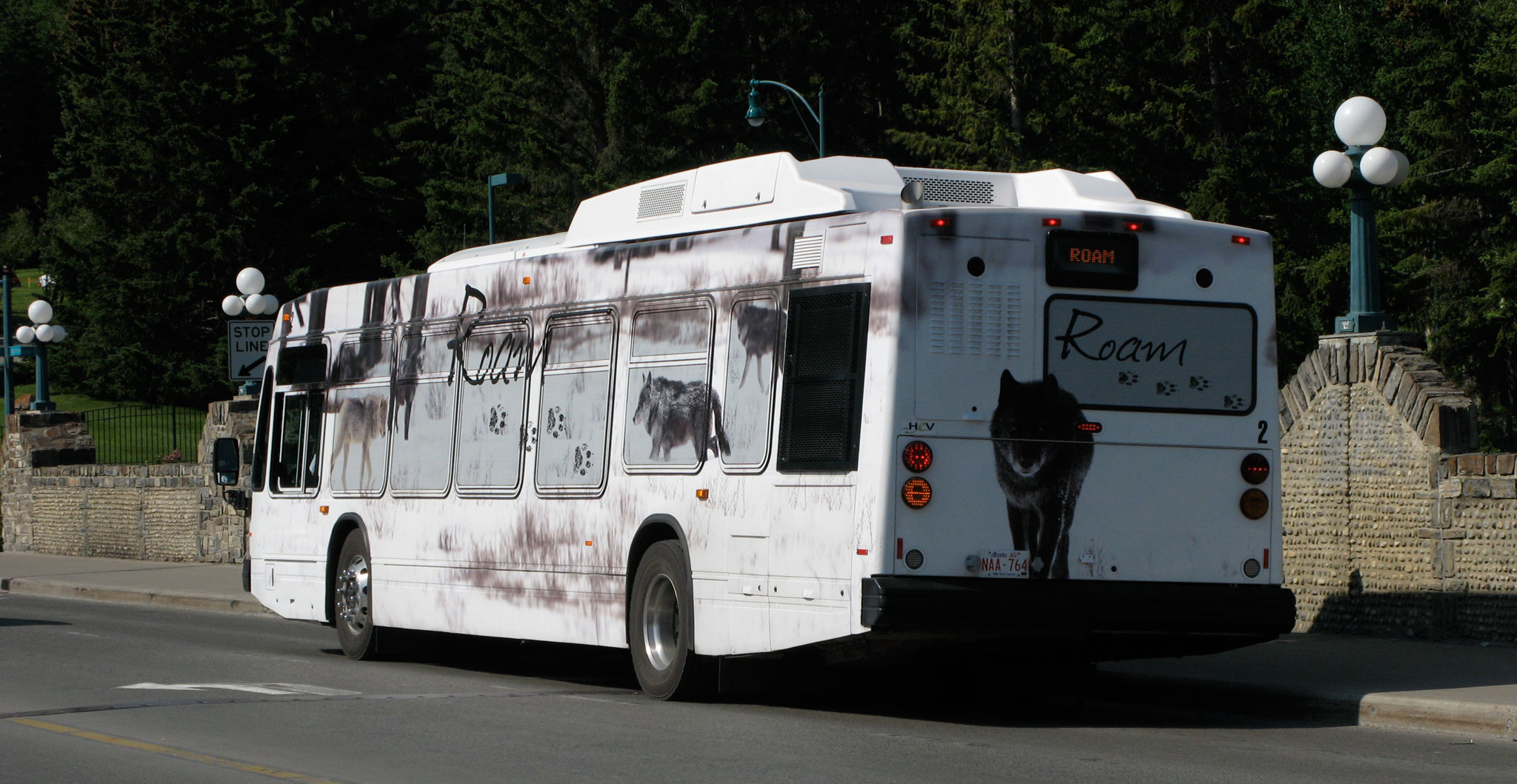
- Formerly: Banff Public Transit
- Parent: Bow Valley Regional Transit Services Commission
- Headquarters: Banff, Alberta
- Locale: Banff, Alberta; Canmore, Alberta; Lake Louise, Alberta; MD of Bighorn (future); Kananaskis Improvement District (future)
- Service type: bus service
- Routes: 14: 7 year-round, 5 seasonal, and 2 temporarily suspended
- Stops: 120
- Destinations: Canmore, Alberta; Banff, Alberta; Lake Louise, Alberta; Banff National Park, Alberta; Kananaskis Country, Alberta; MD of Bighorn (future); Kananaskis Improvement District (future)
- Hubs: 3
- Fleet: Nova LFS
- Daily ridership: 6,100 (weekdays, Q2 2026)
- Annual ridership: 1,887,600 (2025)
- Fuel type: hybrid electric, diesel fuel
- Operator: BVRTSC
- Website: roamtransit.com

Roam is the public transit system for the towns of Canmore, Banff (located inside Banff National Park), and serves Lake Louise (located inside Banff National Park) and the Bow Valley of Alberta's Rockies in Canada. The system is managed by the Bow Valley Regional Transit Services Commission (BVRTSC). In 2025, the system had a ridership of 1,887,600, or about 6,100 per weekday as of the second quarter of 2026.

== History ==
Roam was formerly known as Banff Public Transit and the town has had some form of public transportation since 1994, with services contracted to a variety of private operators.

The system was re-branded as Roam in June 2008. At the same time a new fleet of four hybrid buses was acquired and operation of the service was turned over to a new private contractor, Brewster Inc., a local tour bus company.

On April 21, 2011, the Bow Valley Regional Transit Services Commission (BVRTSC) was formed by the Town of Banff, the Town of Canmore and Improvement District No. 9. This new government agency was authorised to provide or coordinate local and regional transit services in the Bow Valley. Although not a voting member, Parks Canada actively participates in commission meetings.

In the fall of 2012, the BVRTSC took over responsibility for the transit service. On December 3, 2012, regional transit service between Banff and Canmore began.

On November 1, 2016, local transit service in the Canmore was launched.

== Service ==
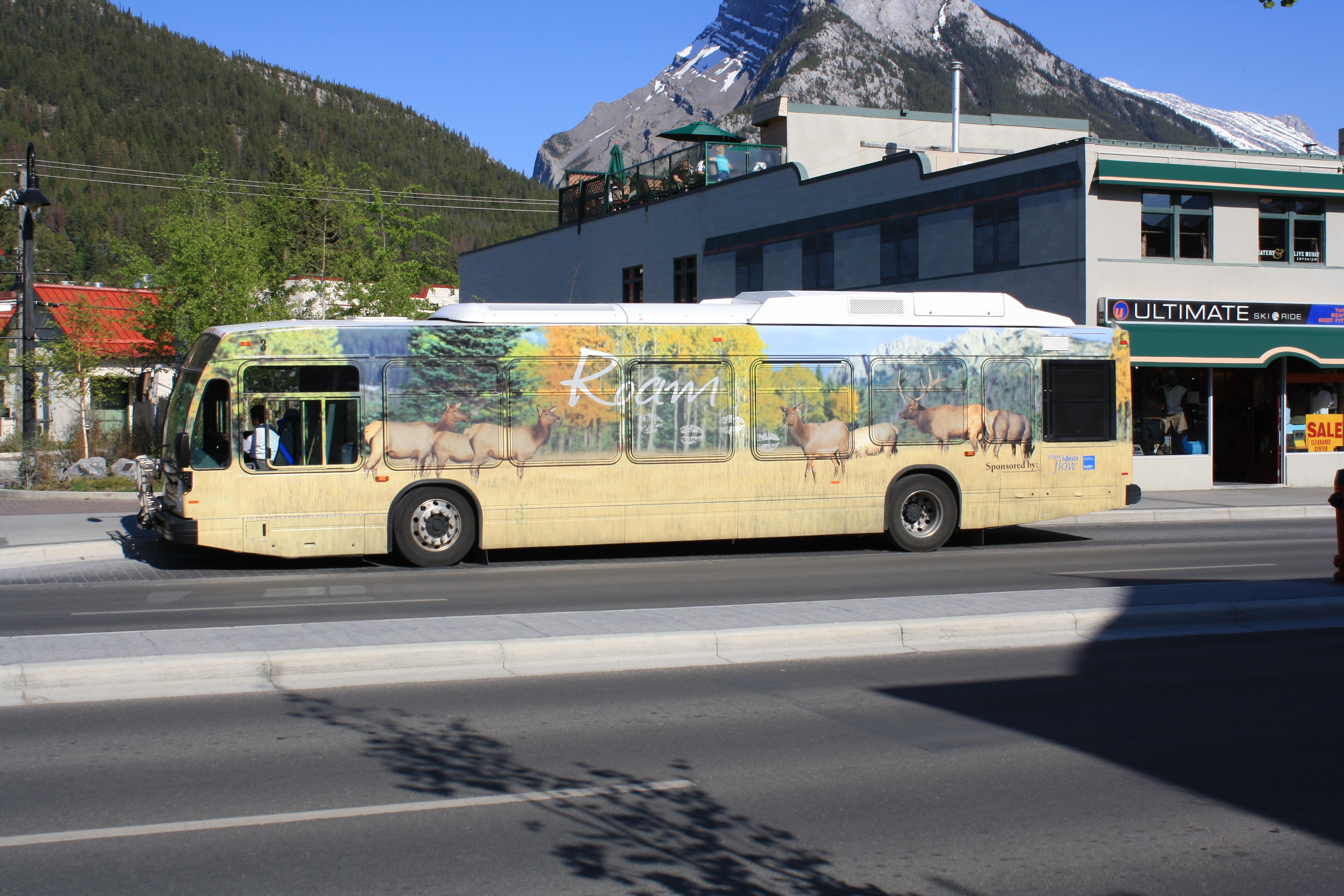
A Roam bus in Banff

There are currently fourteen routes, seven that operate year-round and five that operate seasonally (May to September).

=== Current Routes ===
Route	Districts/Areas Served	Frequency	Notes
Banff Local
1 Sulphur Mountain	Sulphur Mountain District, Banff Downtown District, Uptown District, Industrial District	40 minutes	Limited service to the Banff Industrial District
2 Tunnel Mountain	Banff Springs District, Banff Downtown District, Uptown District, Tunnel Mountain District	40 minutes	Seasonal service to Tunnel Mountain Village I Campground
4 Cave and Basin/Bow Falls	Cave and Basin District, Banff Recreation Grounds, Bow Falls, Banff Downtown District, Uptown District	60 minutes	Operates Friday-Sunday, mid-May to September 30
6 Lake Minnewanka	Banff Downtown District, Uptown District, Cascade Ponds, Minnewanka Park & Ride, Johnson Lake, Two Jack, Minnewanka Lookout, Lake Minnewanka	60 minutes	Operates mid-May to mid-September
7 Fenlands/Banff Centre	Banff Centre District, Surprise Corner, Tunnel Mountain Trailhead, Banff Downtown District, Uptown District, Banff Train Station, Fenlands Recreation Centre	35 minutes	Operates mid-September to mid-May Temporarily suspended from 2019 until 2026
Canmore Local
5T Three Sisters	Downtown Canmore, Hospital Hill, Carey/Homesteads, Three Sisters	35–40 minutes	Currently operating fare-free
5C Cougar Creek	Downtown Canmore, Cougar Creek, Riverstone, Grotto Mountain Village, Kananaskis Way/Bow Valley Trail	35–40 minutes	Currently operating fare-free
12 Palliser	Downtown Canmore, Palliser, Bow Valley Trail, TeePee Town	60 minutes	Currently operating fare-free. Operates mid-September to mid-May
12 Palliser/Grassi Lakes	Downtown Canmore, Palliser, Bow Valley Trail, TeePee Town, Hospital Hill, Quarry Lake Park, Kananaskis Country, Canmore Nordic Centre, Grassi Lakes Trailhead	60 minutes	Currently operating fare-free. Operates mid-May to mid-September
Regional
3 Banff/Canmore Regional	Banff Downtown District, Uptown District, Industrial District, Bow Valley Trail, Downtown Canmore	60 minutes	Regional fare required Operates fare-free within Canmore town limits Future re-routing throuth Harvie Heights is proposed
8S Lake Louise/Banff Regional Scenic	Bow Valley Parkway (Johnston Canyon Campground, Johnston Canyon Trailhead, Castle Mountain Campground, Castle Junction, Protection Mountain Campground, Baker Creek Resort), Lake Louise Ski Resort/Park & Ride, Lake Louise Village Centre, Lake Louise Lakeside, Banff Train Station, Banff Downtown District	4 hours 30 minutes	Temporarily suspended until further notice Regional fare required Operates July to August
8X Lake Louise/Banff Regional Express	Lake Louise Village Centre, Lake Louise Lakeside, Lake Louise Ski Resort/Park & Ride, Banff Train Station, Banff Downtown District	60 Minutes	Regional fare required
9 Johnston Canyon	Bow Valley Parkway (Johnston Canyon Trailhead, Castle Mountain Campground, Castle Junction), Banff Train Station, Banff Downtown District	60 Minutes	Regional fare required
10 Moraine Lake	Moraine Lake, Lake Louise Village Centre, Lake Louise Ski Resort/Park & Ride, Banff Train Station, Banff Downtown District	60 Minutes	Temporarily suspended until further notice Regional fare required Operates September to late-October/early-November
Lake Louise Local
11 Lake Louise Local	Lake Louise Ski Resort/Park & Ride, Lake Louise Village Centre, Lake Louise Recreation Grounds, Lake Louise Campgrounds, Village Road, Lake Louise Lakeside		Operates Seasonally

=== Future Routes ===
Route	Districts/Areas Served	Frequency	Notes
Canmore Local
13 Smith Creek / Dead Man's Flats	Downtown Canmore, Kananaskis Way/Bow Valley Trail, Three Sisters, Smith Creek, Dead Man's Flats	35–40 minutes	Will only Extend to, and have the route named after, Dead Man's Flats once the infrastructure and funding are finalized with the MD of Bighorn Will operate fare-free within Canmore town limits, and a regional fare will be required to exit Smith Creek and go to Dead Man's Flats
Regional
Kananaskis Village / Canmore	Downtown Canmore, Kananaskis Way/Bow Valley Trail, Dead Man's Flats, Exshaw, Lac Des Arcs, Kananaskis, Bearspaw Travel Centre, Kananaskis Visitor Centre, Barrier Lake (summer), Troll Falls (summer), Nakiska (winter), Kananaskis Village, Kananaskis Country Golf Course, Peter Lougheed Parks Discovery Centre, Boulton Creek	1 Hour 15 Minutes	Regional fare will be required
Kananaskis Village / Kananaskis Interlakes	Kananaskis Village, Kananaskis Country Golf Course, Peter Lougheed Parks Discovery Centre, Upper Kananaskis Lake, Boulton Creek Trading Post, Elk Pass Trailhead, Lower Kananaskis Lake, Mt. Sarrail/White Spruce, Interlakes Campground, Panorama, North Interlakes	1 Hour 15 Minutes	Regional fare will be required
Kananaskis Village / Highwood Pass	Kananaskis Village, Elbow Lake, Highwood Pass	45 Minutes	Regional fare will be required Will operate mid-September to late-October/early-November
