= Mount Lawrence Grassi =

Mountain in Alberta, Canada

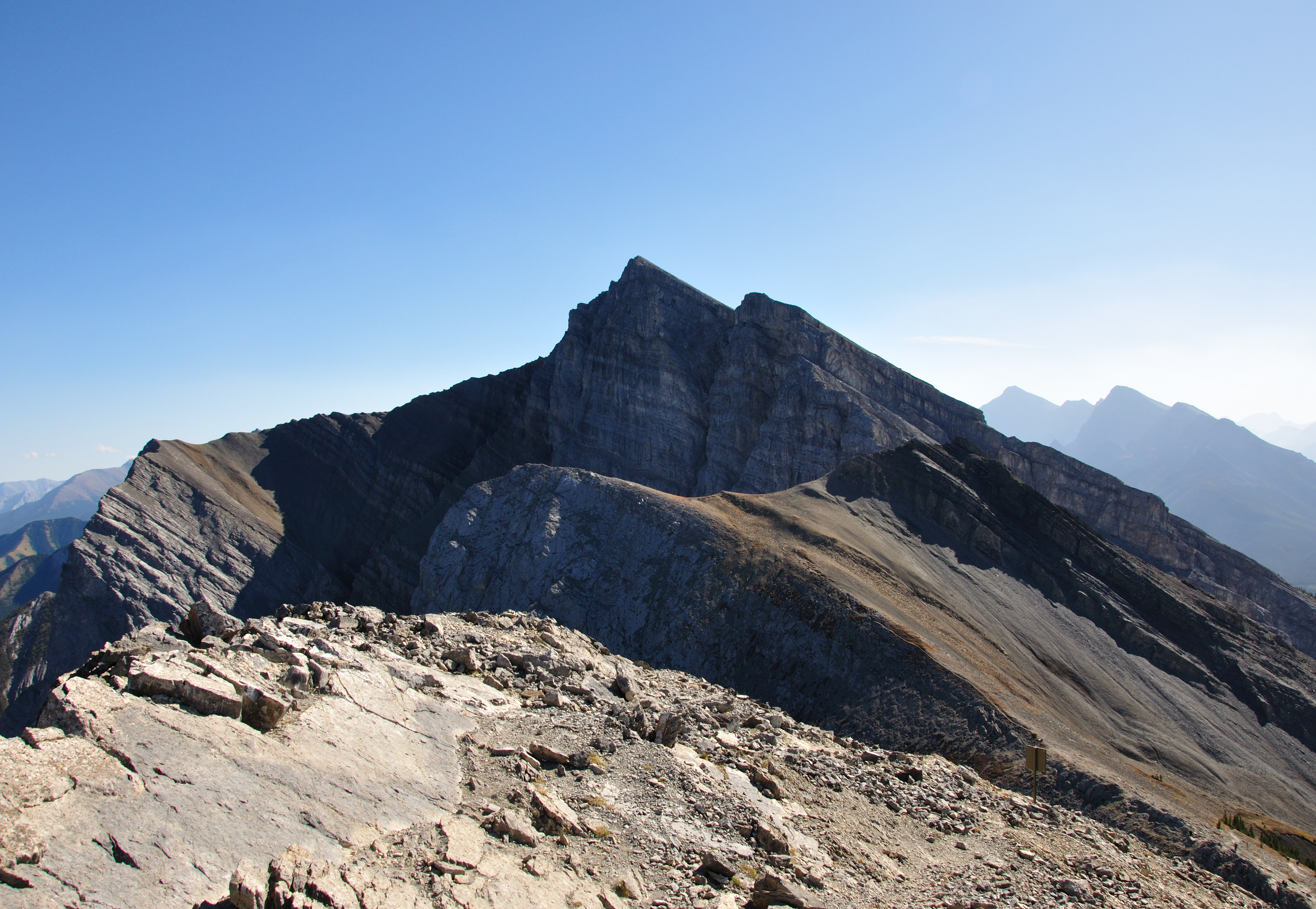
- Mount Lawrence Grassi from Ha Ling Peak, September 2009

Highest point
- Elevation: 2,685 m (8,809 ft)
- Prominence: 396 m (1,299 ft)
- Listing: Mountains of Alberta
- Coordinates: 51°03′11.9″N 115°23′30.1″W

Geography
- Location within Alberta Location within Canada
- Interactive map of Mount Lawrence Grassi
- Country: Canada
- Province: Alberta
- Parent range: Canadian Rockies
- Topo map: NTS 82O3 Canmore

Climbing
- Easiest route: moderate scramble

Mount Lawrence Grassi is the tallest peak of the Ehagay Nakoda massif, a multi-peaked mountain located immediately south of the town of Canmore just east of the Spray Lakes road in Alberta's Canadian Rockies. The mountain sports two other subsidiary peaks with commemorative names: Ha Ling Peak on the northwestern end, and Miners Peak located southeast of Ha Ling Peak between Ha Ling Peak and Mount Lawrence Grassi. Another peak on the mountain is named Ship's Prow, which is on the Southeastern end of the mountain. The mountain is separated from Mount Rundle by Whiteman's Gap, and is separated to the South from The Three Sisters by Three Sisters Pass.

The peak is named for Lawrence Grassi (1890–1980), an Italian miner who emigrated to Canada in 1912. After working with the Canadian Pacific Railway for several years he worked in the Canmore coal mines. Grassi also became a well-respected climbing guide as well as building many trails in the area including one to the Grassi Lakes which also bear his name.

== Name Change ==
Ehagay Nakoda was formerly named Mount Lawrence Grassi, but the name was changed along with renaming Ha Ling Peak. In 1998, the name of the massif was changed to Ehagay Nakoda, meaning "The last Nakoda" ("The last human being"), which is derived from a Stoney Nakoda origin story about the mountain's creation. This traditional story told of a Nakoda who was transformed into a mountain by Iktomni (the Trickster, or the Old Man) so that they would remain on this Earth long after human beings cease to inhabit it. The story was submitted by a local Stoney Nakoda Edler, Peter Lazarus Wesley, for the renaming of Chinaman's Peak, but the decision was made to rename the entire massif while also changing the name of Chinaman's Peak to Ha Ling Peak. To respect the history of Lawrence Grassi and the former name of the mountain, the tallest peak was named Mount Lawrence Grassi.

== Climate ==
Based on the Köppen climate classification, Mount Lawrence Grassi is located in a subarctic climate with cold, snowy winters, and mild summers. Winter temperatures can drop below -20 °C with wind chill factors below -30 °C.

== Gallery ==
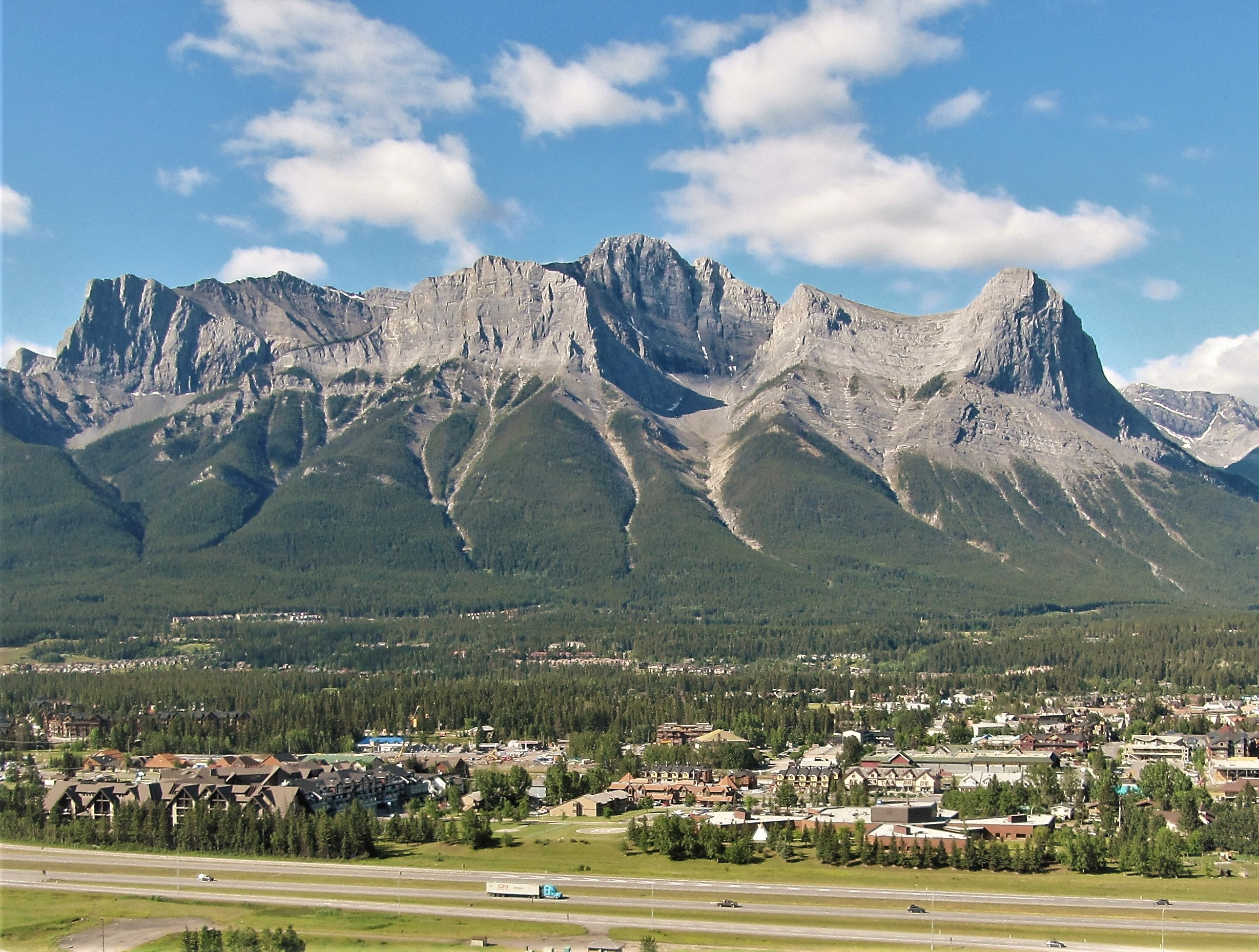
Ehagay Nakoda rises above Canmore

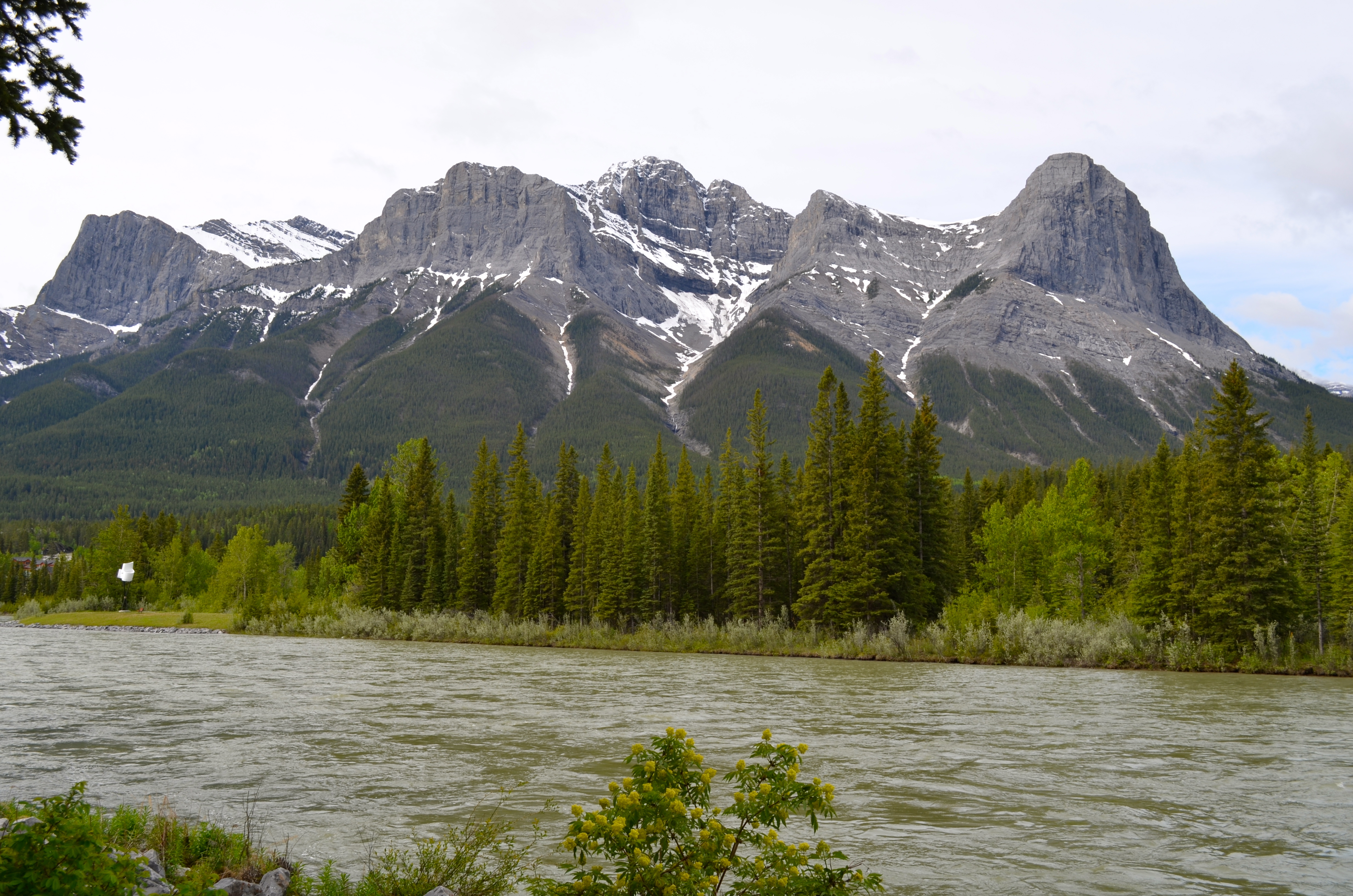
Ehagay Nakoda, with four named peaks: Ship's Prow (far left), Mount Lawrence Grassi (centre), Miners Peak (right), and Ha Ling Peak (far right)

== See also ==
- Geography of Alberta
