= Baker Creek =

Baker Creek or Bakers Creek may refer to:

== Australia ==
- Bakers Creek, Queensland
  - Bakers Creek air crash
- Bakers Creek (New South Wales), a minor tributary of the Manning River

== Canada ==
- Baker Creek (Alberta), a stream in Alberta
- Baker Creek, British Columbia

== United States ==
- Baker Creek (Alaska), a creek in the Rampart region of the Yukon–Koyukuk Census Area
- Baker Creek (Georgia), a creek in west-central Georgia, east of Columbus
- Baker Creek (Little Miami River), a stream in Ohio
- Baker Creek (Montana), a stream in Flathead County, Montana
- Bakers Creek, also Jericho Creek (Delaware River tributary), a tributary of the Delaware River in Pennsylvania
- Baker Creek State Park, South Carolina
- Baker Creek Falls (Yamhill County, Oregon), a waterfall near the Oregon Coast
