= Ehagay Nakoda =

Massif in Canadian Rockies

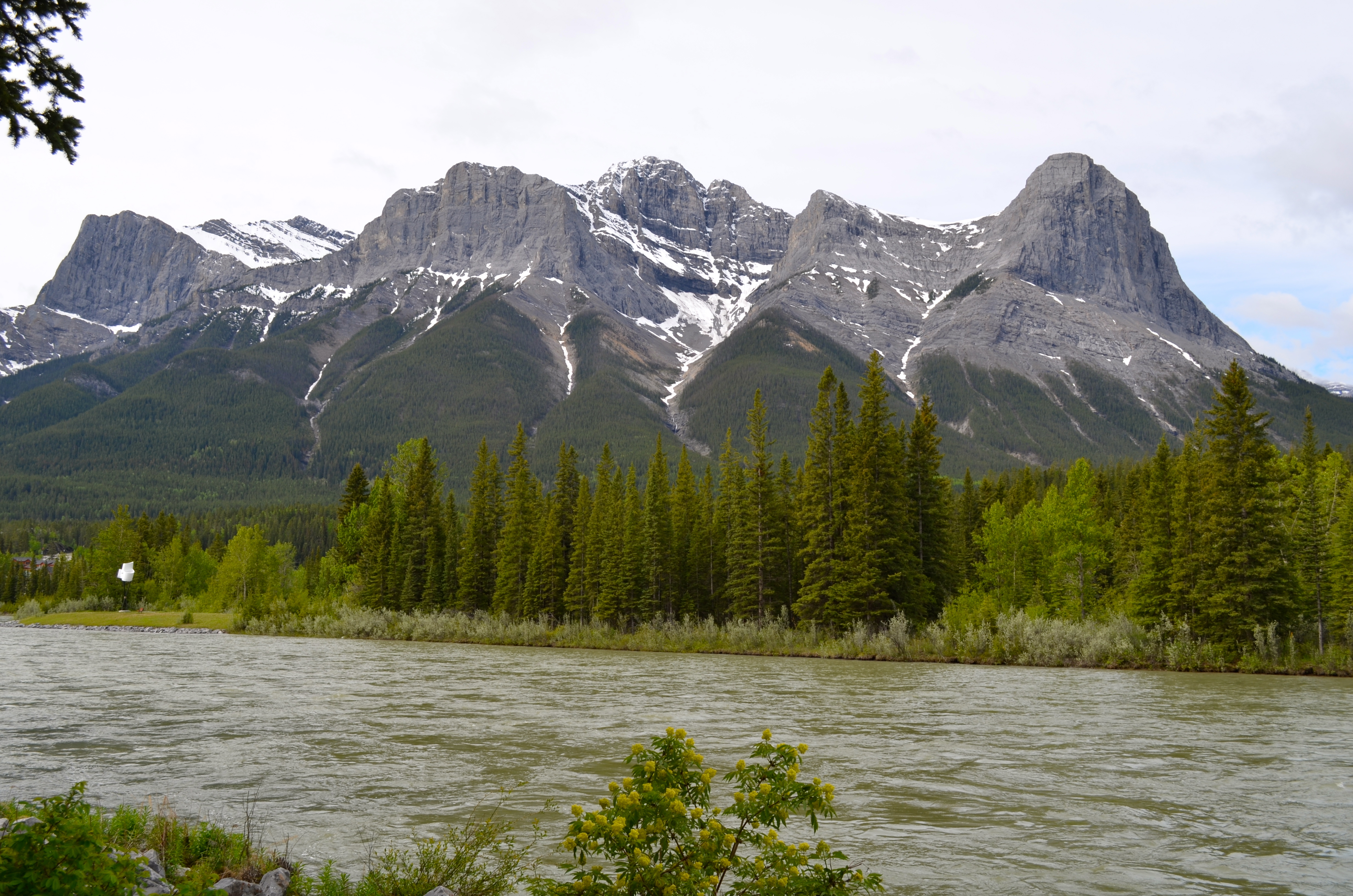
- Ehagay Nakoda from the Bow River, 18 June 2011

Highest point
- Elevation: 2,685 m (8,809 ft)
- Prominence: 396 m (1,299 ft)
- Coordinates: 51°03′11.0″N 115°23′31.0″W

Geography
- Location within Alberta
- Interactive map of Ehagay Nakoda
- Location: Alberta, Canada
- Parent range: Canadian Rockies
- Topo map: NTS 82O3 Canmore

Ehagay Nakoda (/eɪˈhɑːɡeɪ nəˈkoʊdə/ ay-HAH-gay nə-KOH-də; Stoney Nakoda variants include Ehage Nakoda and Îhage Nakoda [eˈhage, ĩˈhage naˈkoda] (Note: There are several variants for the word for 'last' in Stoney Nakoda, including ehage and îhage. The English transcription ehagay seems to represent the ehage variant, but is somewhat ambiguous and therefore allows for both pronunciations.)) is a part of a multi-peaked massif located immediately south of the town of Canmore just east of the Spray Lakes road in Alberta's Canadian Rockies. The massif sports four subsidiary peaks. Ha Ling Peak is the northernmost. Miners Peak is south of that. South of Miners Peak is Mount Lawrence Grassi, tallest of the peaks. Southeast of that is Ship's Prow. The massif is separated from Mount Rundle by Whiteman's Gap to the northwest, and from The Three Sisters by Three Sisters Pass to the south.

== Name change ==
Ehagay Nakoda was formerly named Mount Lawrence Grassi and Ha Ling Peak was named Chinaman's Peak. They were both renamed in 1998. Ehagay Nakoda comes from a Stoney Nakoda legend and means "The Last Nakoda," or the last human being. This traditional story tells of a Nakoda who was transformed into a mountain by Iktomni (Note: Stoney: Îktomnî [ĩ'ktomnĩ]) (the Trickster, or the Old Man) so that they would remain on Earth long after human beings cease to inhabit it. The story was submitted by a local Stoney Nakoda Elder, Peter Lazarus Wesley, when Chinaman's Peak was to be renamed. But the decision was made to apply the Nakoda name to entire massif and rename Chinaman's Peak to Ha Ling Peak. To respect the memory of Lawrence Grassi and the former name of the mountain, the tallest peak was named Mount Lawrence Grassi.

== Named peaks ==
=== Ha Ling Peak ===
This northernmost peak is named in honour of Ha Ling, a Chinese cook working for a mining camp. He bet coworkers fifty dollars that he could climb the mountain and return in less than ten hours. When he returned in five and a half hours, people doubted him so he led them up the mountain to where he had planted a small flag. He then left an even larger flag that could be seen from the nearby town of town of Canmore, Alberta. He is the first person known to have climbed to the summit of the peak.

=== Miners Peak ===
Miners Peak is the first peak south of Ha Ling Peak. It was named in honour of the mining community that once mine coal from the mountain. Though the name of the peak is often spelled as a possessive noun (Miner's Peak), this is incorrect.

=== Mount Lawrence Grassi ===
The peak is next south from Miners Peak. It is named for Lawrence Grassi (1890–1980), an Italian miner who emigrated to Canada in 1912. After working with the Canadian Pacific Railway for several years he worked in the Canmore coal mines, Grassi also became a well-respected climbing guide as well as building many trails in the area, including one to the Grassi Lakes which also bear his name.

=== Ship's Prow ===
Ship's Prow is the southern-most peak of Ehagay Nakoda and is southeast of Mount Lawrence Grassi. It is named for its prominent, ship's prow-like appearance on the end of Ehagay Nakoda as seen from the nearby town of Canmore, Alberta.
