= Lawrence Grassi =

Italian miner

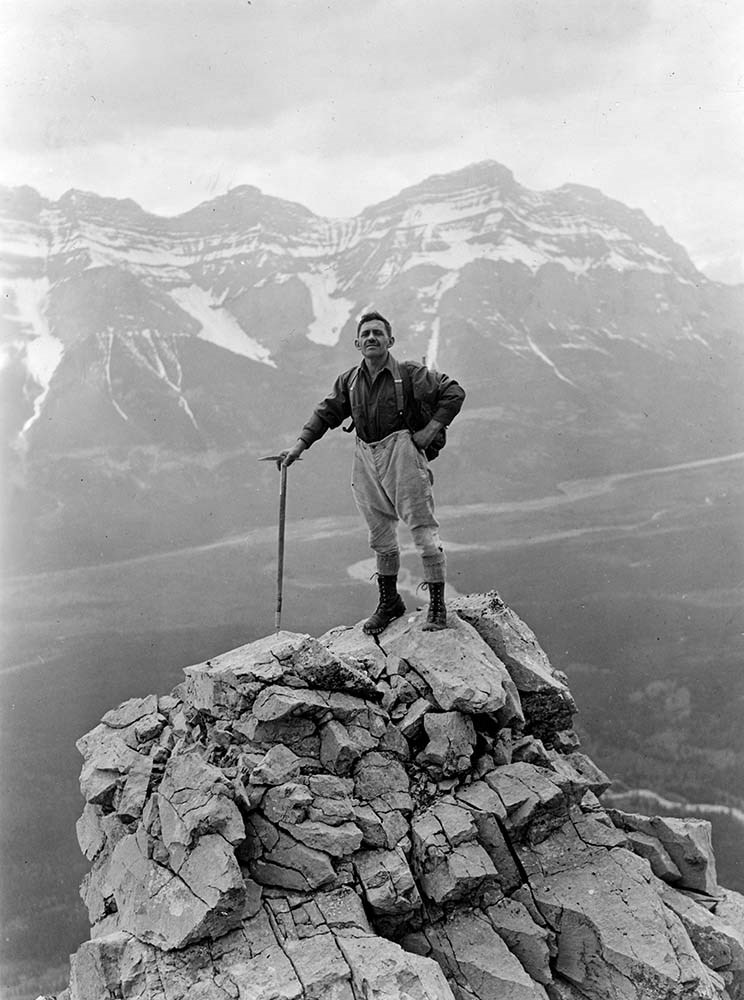
- Lawrence Grassi standing on Princess Margaret Mountain with Mount Rundle and the Bow Valley in the background, circa 1920
- Born: Andrea Lorenzo Grassi; December 20, 1890; Falmenta, Piedmont, Italy
- Died: February 5, 1980 (aged 89); Canmore, Alberta, Canada
- Occupations: Miner, Warden
- Known for: Trail Building, Mountaineering

Andrea Lorenzo Grassi (20 December 1890 – 5 February 1980) was an Italian miner known as Lawrence Grassi. He moved to Canada in 1912, taking on work with the Canadian Pacific Railway (CPR), before settling down in Canmore, Alberta, in 1916. There he worked as a miner, until he retired. Grassi became well known for his passion for the mountains, building hiking trails around Canmore and Lake O'Hara, Yoho National Park. Several plaques have been emplaced at these trails to recognize Grassi for this work.

Numerous places bear his name, such as Mount Lawrence Grassi, Grassi Knob, Grassi Lakes, and Lawrence Grassi Middle School.
