= Holly Ward =

Holly Ward may refer to:

- Holly Ward (artist), Canadian interdisciplinary artist
- Holly Ward (soccer) (born 2003), Canadian soccer player
- Holly Ward (softball) (born 1996), American softball player
