= Spray River =

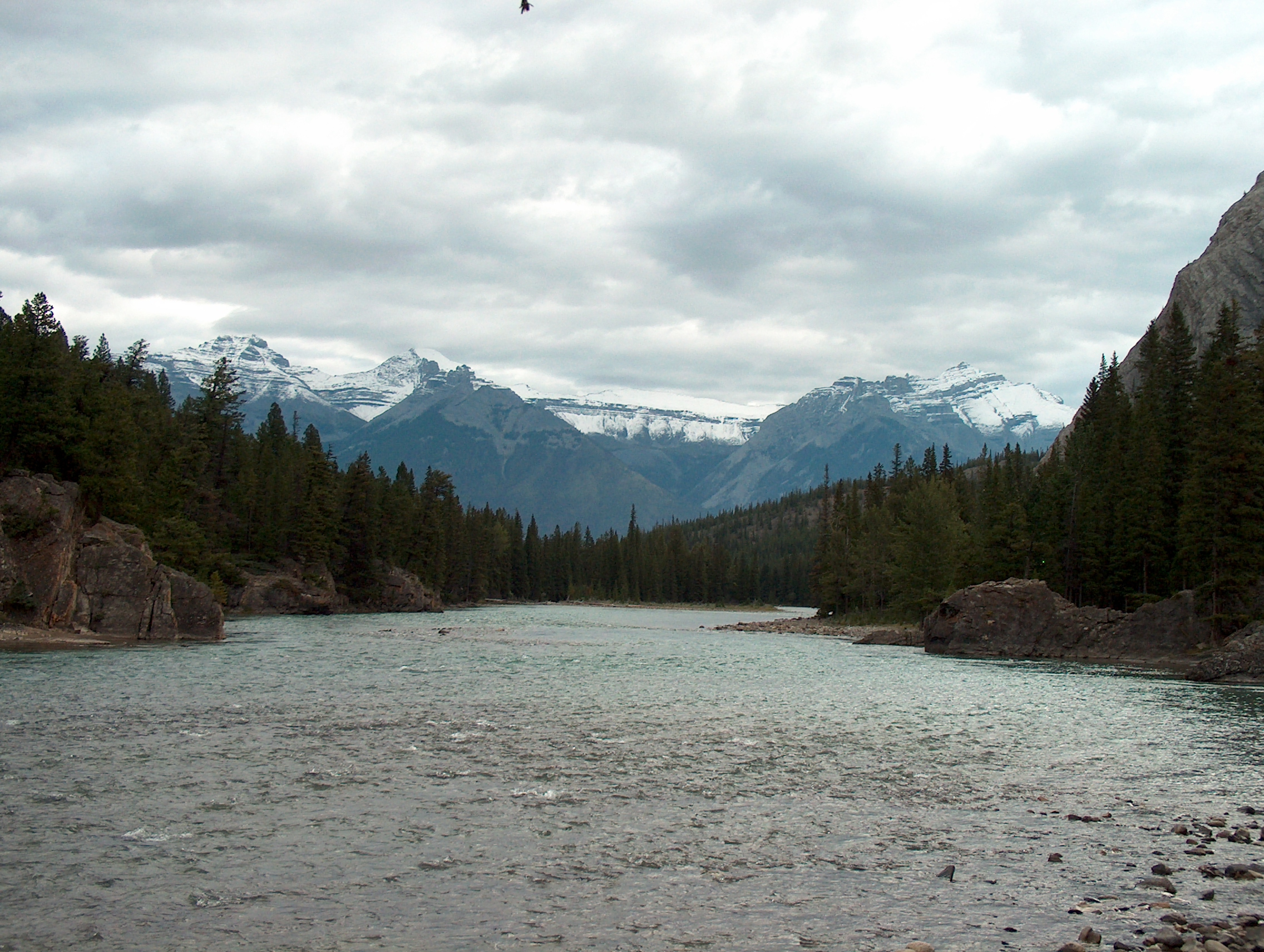

Location
- Country: Canada
- Province: Alberta

Physical characteristics
- Source: Banff National Park
- Mouth
  - location: Bow River
  - coordinates: 51.16571°N 115.55800°W
- Length: 64 km (40 mi)

Basin features
- Waterbodies: Spray Lakes Reservoir; Goat Pond

The Spray River is a tributary of the Bow River in western Alberta, Canada.

The Spray River originates in the southern area of Banff National Park in the Canadian Rockies and soon enters the Spray Lakes Reservoir formed in 1951 after the construction of the Canyon Dam. At that point, the river briefly touches the Spray Valley Provincial Park before returning to Banff National Park.

The river originally continued to flow north-northwest between the Goat Range and the Sundance Range before merging with Goat Creek at the northern end of the Goat Range and eventually meeting the Bow River in the Town of Banff, just below Bow Falls. However, since the construction of the dam the Spray River bed is mostly dry north-northwest of the Spray Lakes Reservoir as the Dam diverts most of the water towards the Spray Powerhouse in Canmore. The river regains some water from Goat Creek and other smaller tributaries before arriving at the town of Banff.

Meanwhile, most of the Spray River's water exits the reservoir through the secondary Three Sisters Dam where there is a small 3MW generating station. From there it immediately enters a secondary reservoir known as the Goat Pond which directs the water into a 6 kilometre long canal which includes an 800-meter tunnel though the shoulder of Ha Ling Peak. From there it enters White Man Pond before being funnelled into a penstock to the main Spray Powerhouse at Grassi Lakes. The Spray Powerhouse is the second largest conventional (non Pumped-storage) hydroelectric facility in Alberta with a capacity of 112MW. The water continues to another shorter penstock leading to the Rundle Powerhouse where an additional 50MW of generation is available. From there water is released into the Bow River. The 4 dams and three power stations are owned and operated by TransAlta.

Despite the diversion being a man made canal, it is often also called the Spray River, leading to confusion as many maps mark both the diversion and the original mostly dry river bed as the Spray river.

The scenic Smith Dorrien Trail follows the Spray River diversion canal and the shore of the Spray Lakes Reservoir.

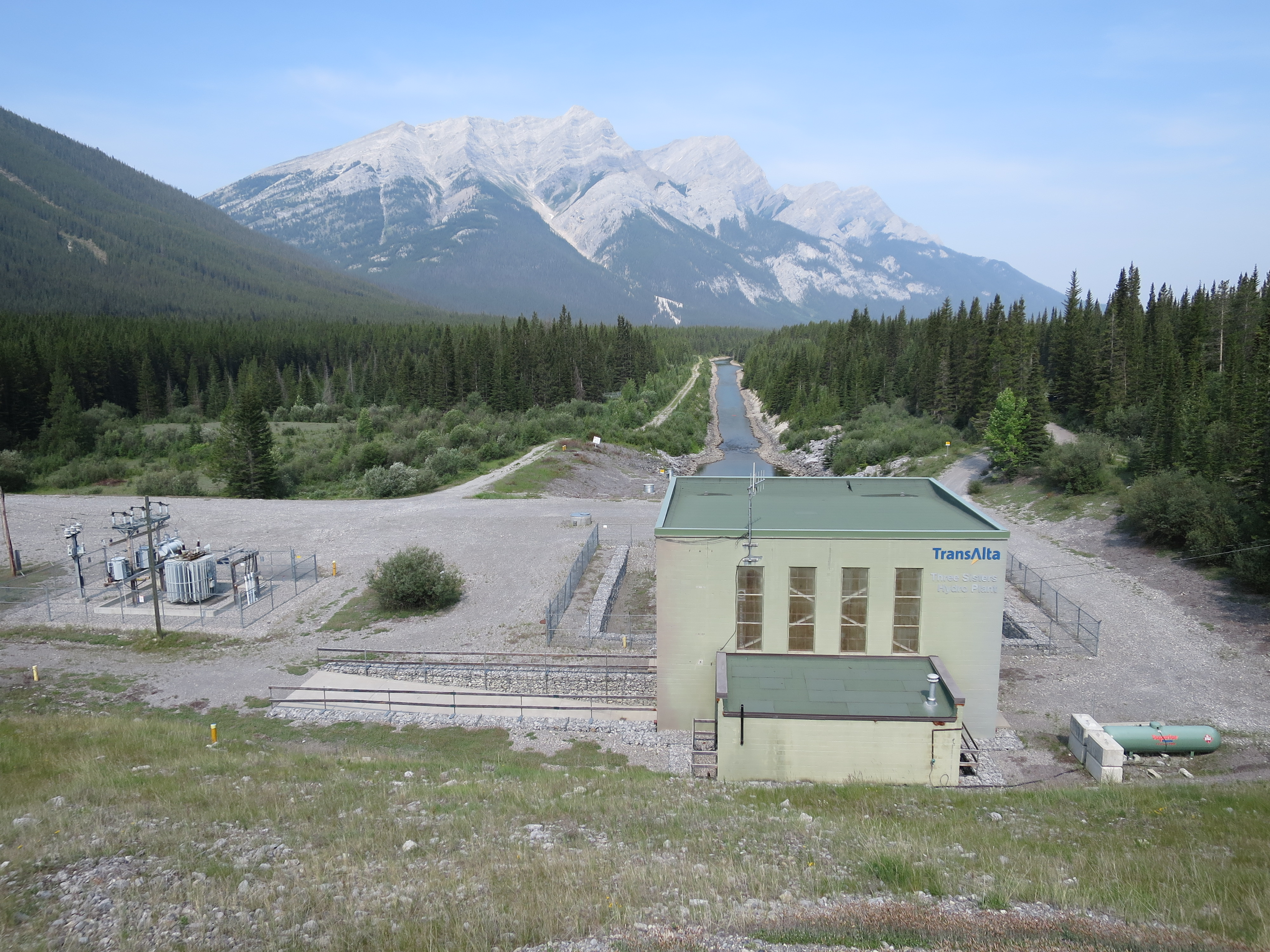
The Spray River just below Spray Lakes Reservoir

== See also ==
- List of rivers of Alberta
