= Bow Valley =

Valley in Alberta, Canada

Coordinates: 51.16711°N 115.47953°W

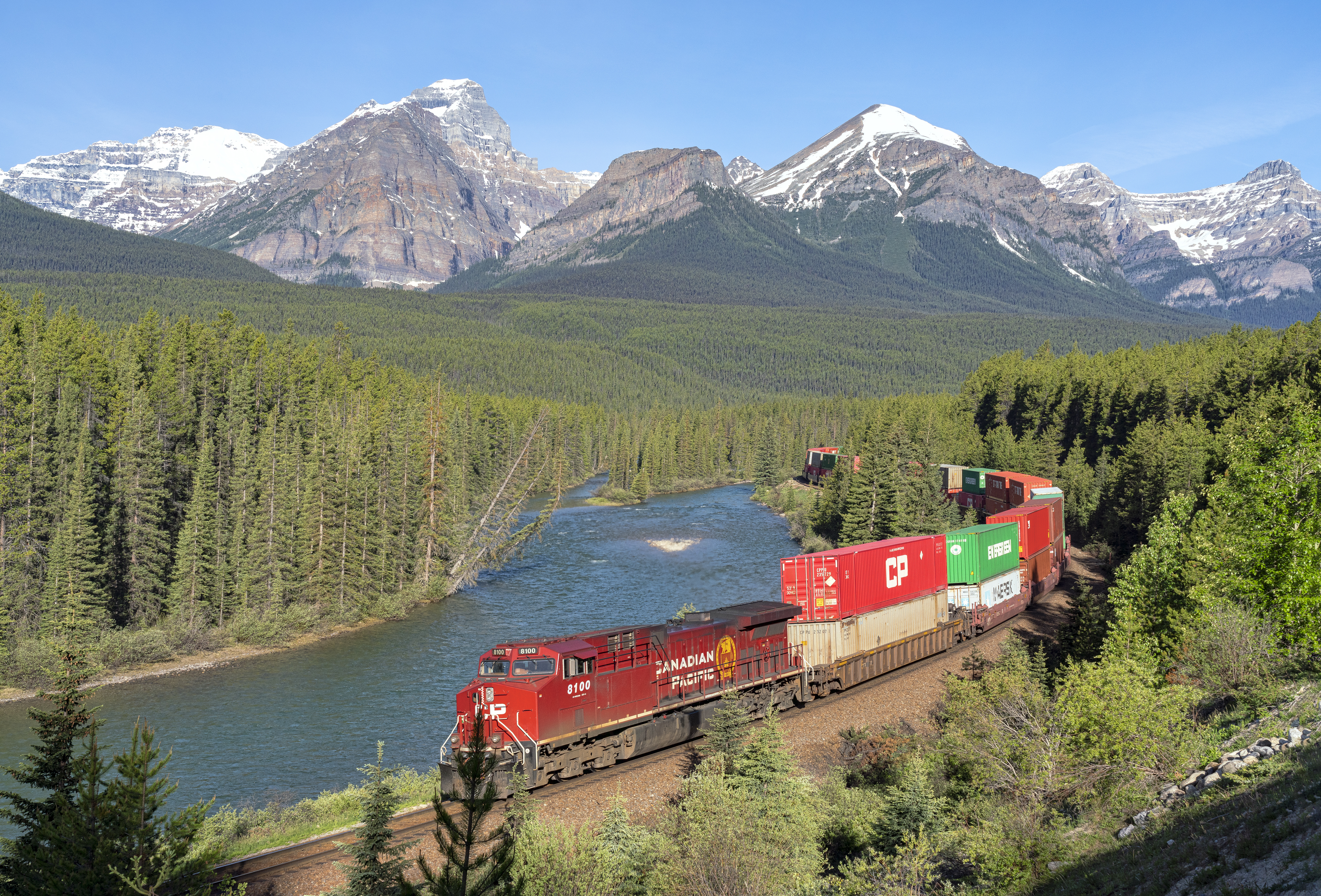
View from Morant's Curve in Banff National Park

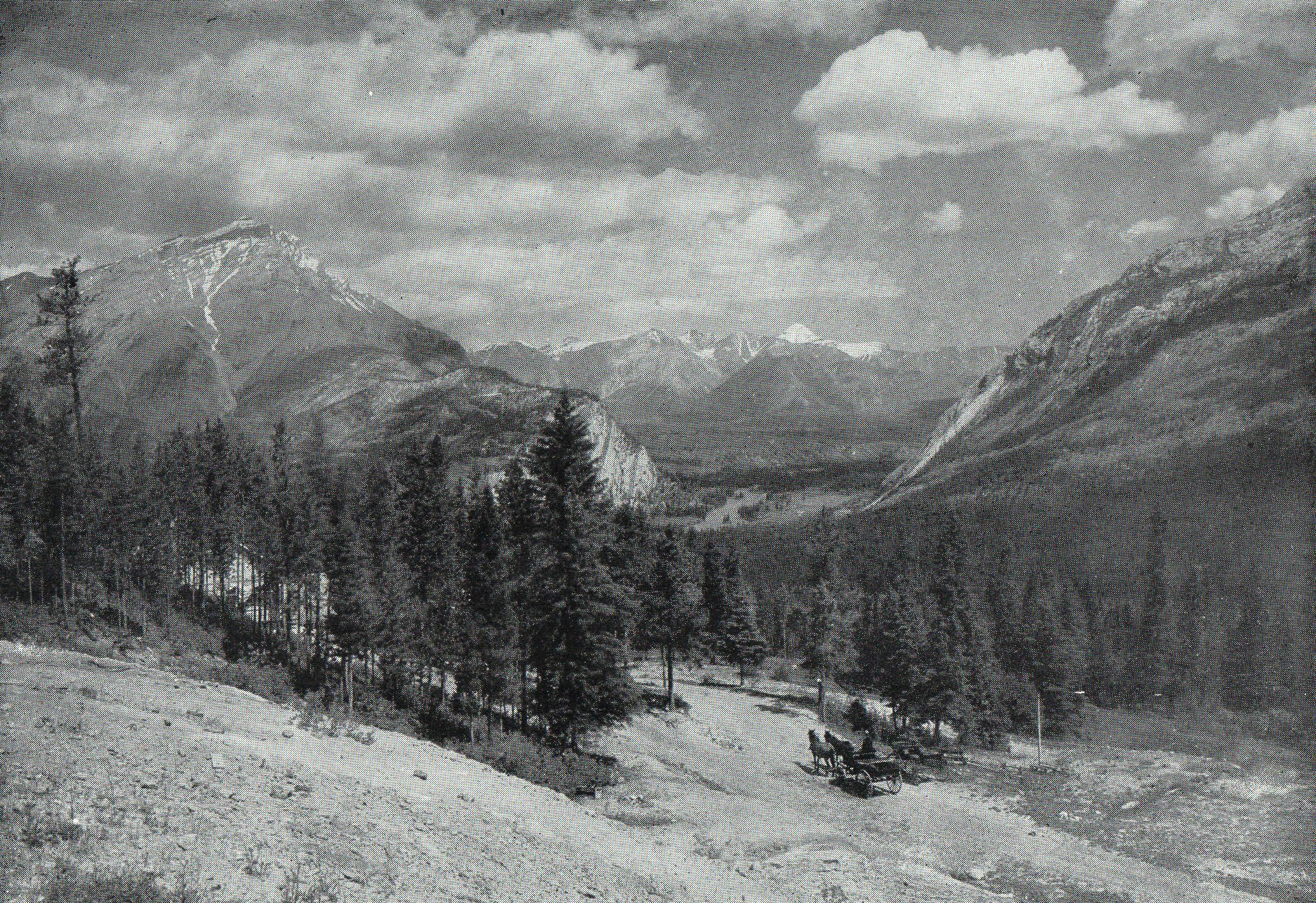
View from Canadian Pacific Railway, 1914

Bow Valley is a valley along the upper Bow River in Alberta, Canada.

The name "Bow" refers to the reeds that grew along its banks and which were used by the local First Nations people to make bows; the Blackfoot language name for the river is Makhabn, meaning "river where bow weeds grow".

== Community ==
There are several communities in the Bow Valley, including Banff, Canmore, Kananaskis, the hamlets of Dead Man's Flats, Exshaw, Harvie Heights, Lac des Arcs, Lake Louise, and the unincorporated communities of Kananaskis, and Kananaskis Village. Local residents are culturally diverse, with growing immigration trends since the early 2000s.

== Parks ==
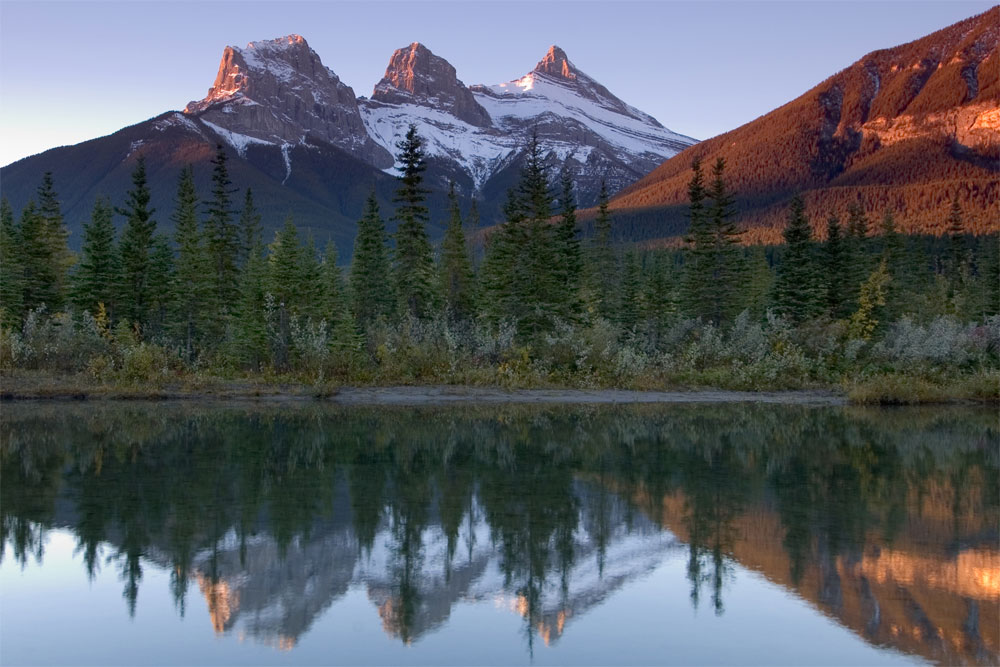
Three Sisters ridge above the Bow Valley

Bow Valley Provincial Park (part of the Kananaskis Country park system) was established east of the Canadian Rockies in the arch of the valley, while the upper course of the Bow River flows through Banff National Park. The Canmore Nordic Centre Provincial Park is located between the Banff National Park and Canmore in the Bow River Valley.

Numerous other recreation areas dot the valley. Provincial Recreation Areas are established at Three Sisters, Gap Lake, Grotto Mountain, Lac des Arcs, Heart Ridge, Heart Mountain, Ghost Reservoir and other locations.

== Lakes ==
Many lakes, glacial and artificial, are found in the Bow Valley:

- Bow Lake
- Hector Lake
- Vermilion Lakes
- Lake Minnewanka
- Lake Louise
- Gap Lake
- Lac des Arcs
- Ghost Lake
- Quarry Lake
- Grassi Lakes
- Spray Lakes
