= Holly Ward (artist) =

Canadian artist

- Known for: Artist
- Website: hollyward.org

Holly Ward (b. 1973 in Saint John, New Brunswick) is an interdisciplinary artist of settler ancestry based in Vancouver, BC, and Ik'emlúps te Secwépems/Heffley Creek, BC. Ward's work utilizes sculpture, multi-media installation, architecture, video and drawing as a means to examine the role of aesthetics in the formation of new social realities.

== Life ==
Ward obtained a BA in English from the University of New Brunswick in 1995 and went on to obtain a BFA, Interdisciplinary from the Nova Scotia College of Art and Design in 1999. In 2006, Ward completed her MFA, Studio at the University of Guelph. From 2009 to 2010, Ward was the artist-in-residence at Langara College, wherein she commenced The Pavilion project, a 22 geodesic dome artistic experimentation involving artists, writers, designers, and Langara College students. She is also an Associate Professor in the Visual Arts Program at York University.

== Artistic practice ==
Holly Ward’s work is informed by research into visionary practices, including utopian philosophy, science fiction literature, visionary architecture, counter-cultural movements, and urban planning. Her practice examines the themes of the arbitrary nature of symbolic designation and the functional role of form within social and subjective contexts. In recent years, her work has increasingly engaged with non-human entities and ecological systems, emphasizing sustainability and holistic adaptation in response to evolving natural and cultural conditions. She states, "My work relies on aesthetic conventions to display the ideological underpinnings of certain forms, and capitalizes on this familiarity to point to an extant psychic relationship to the social, philosophical and even political potential of form."

Ward has produced solo exhibitions at Artspeak, the Morris and Helen Belkin Gallery, the Kelowna Art Gallery, Or Gallery, YYZ Gallery, Republic Gallery, Volta 6 Basel, L'Oeil de Poisson, the Struts Gallery, and others. She has participated in group exhibitions in Canada, England, Mexico, the United States, Norway and South Korea. Ward's first solo exhibition, More Softer Please, took place at the Helen Pitt Gallery, Vancouver, BC in 2000.

In 2009, Ward's work, Island, was included in the Vancouver Art Gallery's exhibition, How Soon Is Now. Island consisted of a large pile of soil that was moved by volunteers to different parts of the gallery during the show. Vancouver Art Gallery curator, Kathleen Ritter said of Island, "it's a playfully irreverent work and it challenged our conventional notions of the art object being static, by making something that has an almost parasitical relationship with the other works in the exhibition." In 2018, a new installation by Ward, Raw Goods, was shown at the Polygon Gallery in Vancouver as part of their inaugural exhibition, N.Vancouver. The work consisted of "two wide, cone-like piles - one coal, one sulphur. Both commodities are integral to the local economy, and the sulphur's bright yellow is a familiar sight for anyone who has spent time on the Stanley Park seawall across the Inlet."

In 2016, Ward's work Industry is Useless Without Culture: REsource Extraction #1-3 was acquired by the Vancouver Art Gallery for its permanent collection. Her work is also held in the collections of Fogo Island Arts and Scotiabank. Her notable public commissions include Cosmic Chandelier (UniverCity at Simon Fraser University, Burnaby), Monument to the Vanquished Peasant (Western Front, Vancouver), and The Wall (CBC and the Vancouver Heritage Foundation).

=== Collaboration ===
Ward is a long-time collaborator with Vancouver artist, Kevin Schmidt. The pair collaborated on Schmidt's EDM House (2013), The Pavilion, Phase 2 (2011), an architectural hybrid that is also the pair's home, and Screen in the Landscape (2015).

=== Select solo exhibitions ===
- 2017, Holly Ward: Planned Peasanthood, Kamloops Art Gallery, Kamloops, BC
- 2009, Here & There, Republic Gallery, Vancouver, BC
- 2008, Radical Rupture, Morris and Helen Belkin Gallery, Vancouver, BC
- 2004-2005, The Future Is Now, L’Oeil de Poisson, Quebec, PQ, Or Gallery, Vancouver, BC, YYZ Artist’s Outlet, Toronto, ON

=== Select group exhibitions ===
- 2025, Town + Country: Narratives of Property and Capital, Morris and Helen Belkin Gallery, Vancouver, BC
- 2019, Displacement, Vancouver Art Gallery, Vancouver, BC
- 2018, N.Vancouver, Polygon Gallery, Vancouver, BC
- 2012, An Era of Discontent: Art as Occupation, Kamloops Art Gallery, Kamloops, BC
- 2010, Invitation to an Infiltration, Contemporary Art Gallery, Vancouver, BC
- 2009, How Soon Is Now, Vancouver Art Gallery, Vancouver, BC
- 2008, The Sound I’m Looking For, Part 2, Charles H. Scott Gallery, Vancouver, BC
- 2007, Gasoline Rainbows, Contemporary Art Gallery, Vancouver, BC
- 2006, Until Then Then, Western Front, Vancouver, BC

=== Publications ===
Ward’s publications include Planned Peasanthood (Kamloops Art Gallery, 2021), an ongoing interdisciplinary artist project that examines the historical figure of the peasant worker in relation to the contemporary subject, Volumes (Blackwood Gallery, 2015), and Every Force Evolves a Form (Artspeak, 2012). Her work is also discussed in Jeff Derksen’s After Euphoria (JRP Ringier Press, 2013), which features the critical essay For Now, on Holly Ward’s Persistence of Vision.
