= ArtsPeak Arts Festival =

Arts festival in Canmore, Alberta, Canada

The ArtsPeak Arts Festival is held in Canmore, Alberta, Canada every June and celebrates Canmore's artistic spirit by featuring performing artists, artists and artisans, an art walk, a literary festival, film screenings, and street performers.

The 2011 Arts Festival featured standing stones.
