= Bow Falls =

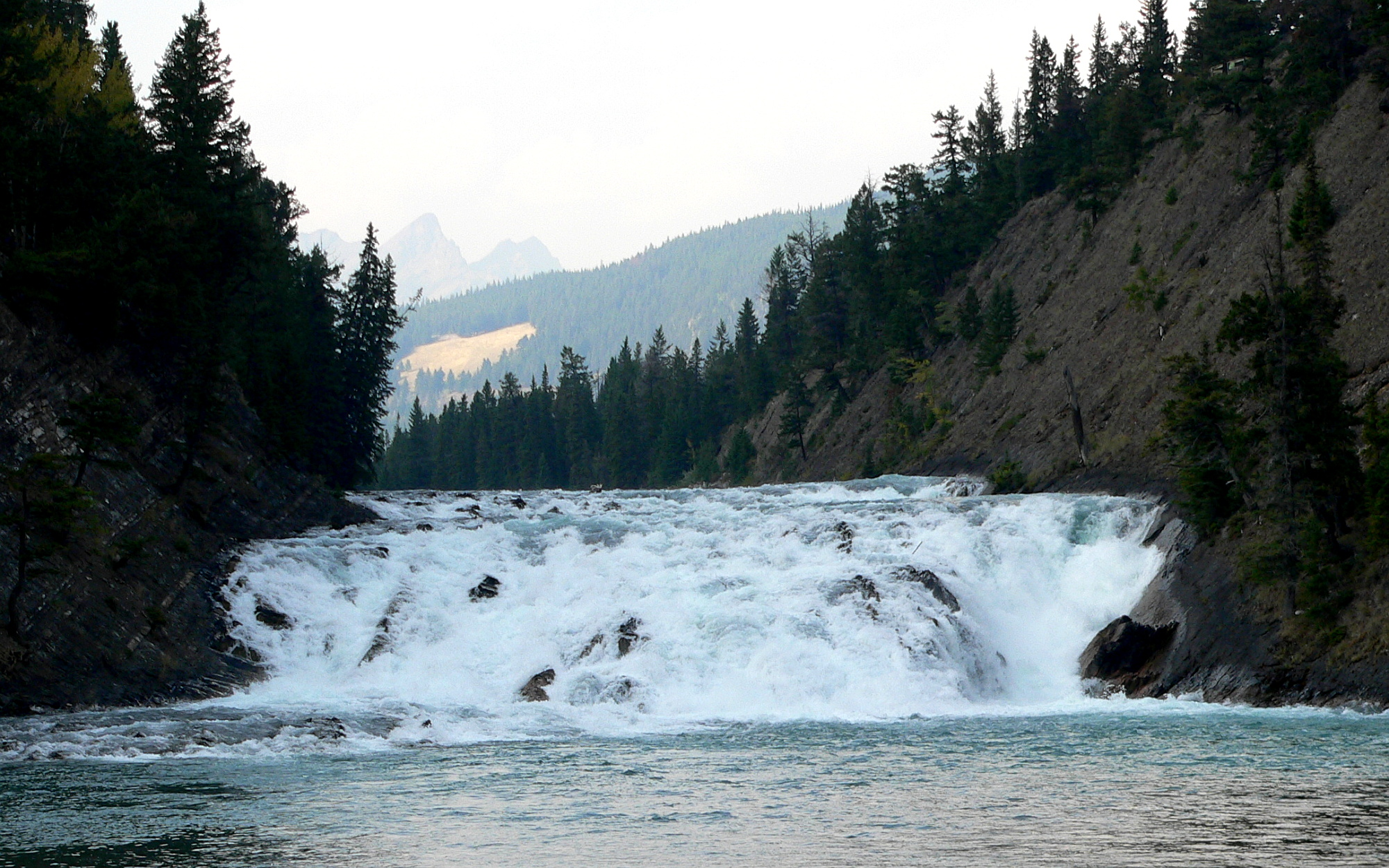
- Bow Falls on the Bow River near Banff

- Location within Alberta
- Location: Banff
- Coordinates: 51°10′00.79″N 115°33′37.75″W
- Type: Block
- Total height: 30 ft (9.1 m)
- Number of drops: 1
- Longest drop: 30 ft (9.1 m)
- Total width: 100 ft (30 m)
- Watercourse: Bow River

Bow Falls is a major waterfall on the Bow River, Alberta just before the junction of it and the Spray River. They are located near the Banff Springs Hotel and golf course on the left-hand side of River Road.

The falls are within walking distance of both Banff and the Banff Springs Hotel, so they are visited by many tourists despite their relatively small size.

The 1953 Marilyn Monroe film River of No Return featured the falls.

== See also ==
- List of waterfalls
- List of waterfalls of Canada
