= Baker Creek (Little Miami River tributary) =

Stream in Ohio, U.S.

Coordinates: 39°21′49″N 84°10′40″W

Baker Creek is a stream in the U.S. state of Ohio. It is a tributary to the Little Miami River.

Baker Creek has the name of the local Baker family.
