= Baker Creek, British Columbia =

Baker Creek
- Location of Baker Creek in British Columbia
- Coordinates: 52°56′00″N 123°01′10″W
- Country: Canada
- Province: British Columbia
- Time zone: UTC−07:00 (PT)
- Postal code: Postal Code V2J 3H9
- Area codes: 250, 778

Baker Creek is a community located in British Columbia, Canada, west of Quesnel along the Nazko highway, at the south end of Puntataenkut Lake. People in the community enjoy many outdoor activities such as fishing, hunting, boating, camping, and riding horses, ATVs and snowmobiles.
