= Canmore Museum and Geoscience Centre =

Museum in Canmore, Alberta, Canada

Canmore Museum
- Former name: Canmore Museum & Geoscience Centre (CMAGS)
- Established: 1984
- Location: Canmore, Canada
- Coordinates: 51.089°N 115.360°W
- Director: Lisa Isley
- Website: https://canmoremuseum.com/

Canmore Museum (formerly Canmore Museum & Geoscience Centre) is the public name used by the Centennial Museum Society of Canmore. The Society was incorporated in 1984 under The Societies Act of the Province of Alberta. The society is also a registered charity. In June 2004, the museum moved from its original location to a new purpose built space in the Canmore Civic Centre. Spanning generations, cultures and social classes, the museum presents over 120 years worth of local history.

== Affiliations ==
The Museum is affiliated with: CMA, CHIN, and Virtual Museum of Canada. The Canmore Museum and Geoscience Centre is a member of the Canadian Museums Association, an organization that represents nearly 2000 museums. Each year, more than 55 million visitors attend Canadian museums. In turn, these institutions employ over 10,000 full-time, around 10,000 part-time employees and are supported by more than 40,000 volunteers. In addition, it is a member of the Alberta Museums Association.

== Recognition ==
The Canmore Museum received the Recognized Museum designation from the Alberta Museums Association. To earn this designation, the museum provided a panel of museum professionals with evidence achieving internationally recognized criteria of a museum.

This designation is achieved by participating in the Museum Affirmation Program, a new initiative designed to strengthen the Association's accountability toward the public funds it distributes through grants and programming to the province's museums.

The Canmore Museum has met the standards required for recognition as a museum.

== Programs ==
Programming is an important component of the organization. The museum also runs school and summer programs for children of various ages as part of its education mandate.

== History ==
The museum started from a school assignment in 1936. Teacher Edna Appleby gave the students an assignment to write a letter to a foreign country requesting a doll in ethnic dress. One of the students, Mavis Mallabone, continued to collect dolls from all over the world. This significant collection was on display at the original museum until the mid-1990s. The museum as steward of the town's history has a collection of artifacts from early mining history to the 1988 Winter Olympics and beyond.

After the mine closed in 1979, some expected that the town would soon follow the likes of nearby Georgetown, Anthracite and Bankhead and become a ghost town or vanish like the work in the coal mine. Instead, within a few years, Canmore was the site of the Nordic Centre for the 1988 Winter Olympics. The resulting development through the 1990s, and beyond have led to a mountain community with year round tourism as a sought after vacation destination and a major real estate market in recreational property. History buffs have no shortage of places to visit in the town of Canmore including the 19th Century North-West Mounted Police Barracks hosted by the Canmore Museum and Geoscience Centre. In addition, the miner's favourite hang-out, the Canmore Hotel, the original Miner's Union Hall, is still a multi-use facility which will be the cornerstone of the new Lamphouse Theatre project.

== Exhibits ==
Survival In Paradise

This permanent exhibit opened in 2023, and acts as an ode to Canmore's past as a coal mining town. Guests can discover artifacts that demonstrate what life was like in Canmore before the mines closed in 1979, as well as exploring the mines through a Virtual Reality Experience.

Mountain Kids: Growing up in the Bow Valley

This temporary exhibit opened in February 2025, and outlines the lives of Canmore's youth, in the past & present.

== Events ==
The Canmore Museum hosts many presentations and evening talks showcasing local authors, history, heritage, geoscience and other areas of interest. The museum society has fought to save heritage sites in the Canmore area such as the Canmore Hotel. The museum welcomes feedback regarding the town's definition of heritage and history.

== Publications ==
In 2008, the Canmore Museum published 'Survival in Paradise: A Century of Coal Mining in the Bow Valley'. The book was written by Walter J. Riva, a former mine engineer and manager at the Canmore Mines Ltd. and member of the Canadian Mining Hall of Fame, with editing and layout design by Rob Alexander. This important book tells the story of coal mining in the Bow Valley, including Anthracite, Bankhead, Georgetown and Canmore.
