= The Three Sisters (Alberta) =

Trio of mountains in Alberta, Canada

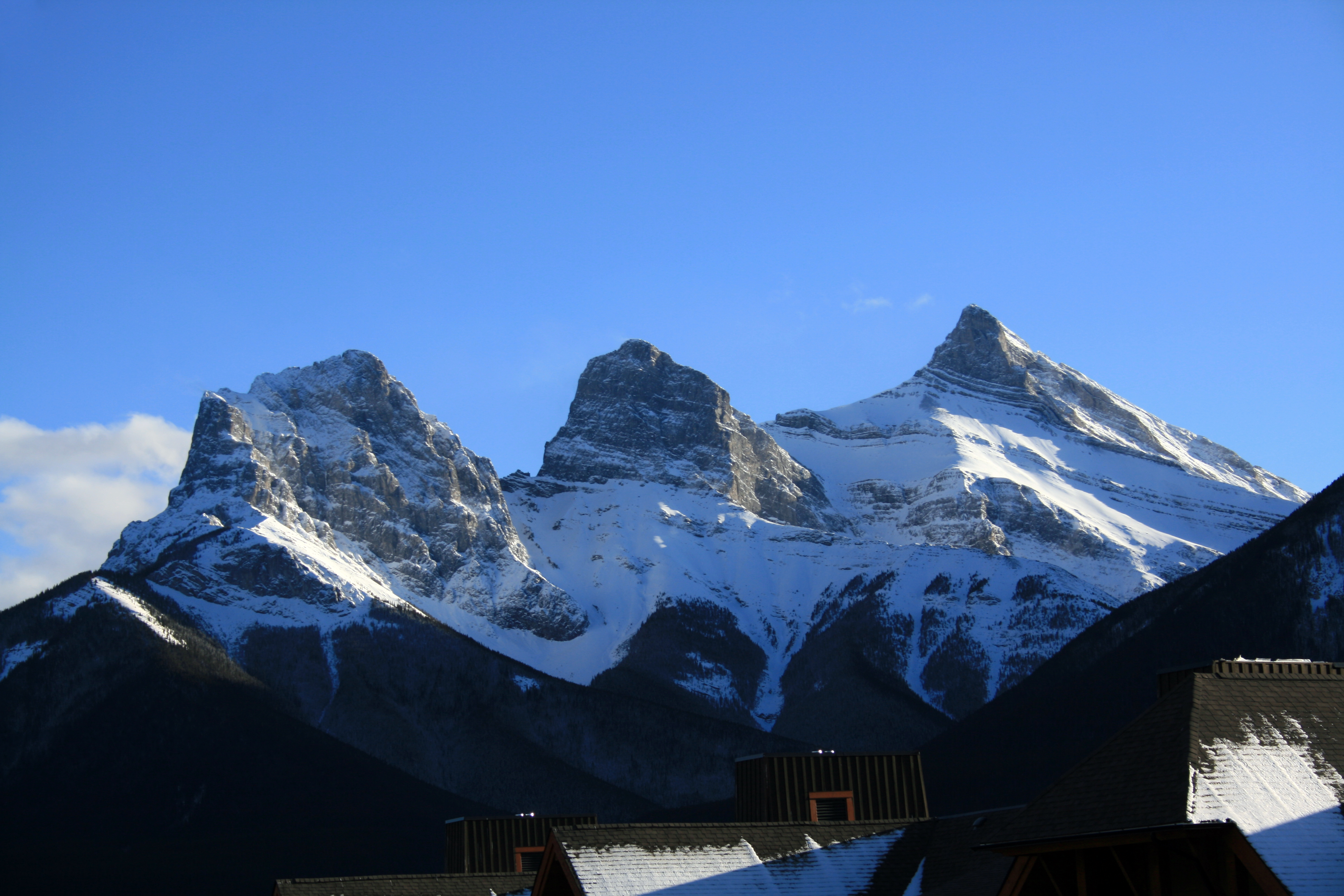
- Three Sisters above the rooftops of Canmore

Highest point
- Elevation: 2,936 m (9,633 ft)
- Listing: Mountains of Alberta
- Coordinates: 51°01′29″N 115°19′50″W

Geography
- Location within Alberta
- Interactive map of The Three Sisters
- Country: Canada
- Province: Alberta
- Parent range: South Banff Range, Canadian Rockies
- Topo map: NTS 82O3 Canmore

Climbing
- First ascent: 1887 by J.J. McArthur

The Three Sisters are a trio of peaks near Canmore, Alberta, Canada. They are known individually as Big Sister, Middle Sister and Little Sister.

In Stoney, the traditional language of the Îyârhe Nakôda (Stoney) the peaks are also referred to as the three sisters. However, the name refers to a story of Ĩ-ktomnĩ, the old man or trickster, who would promise 'three sisters' in marriage whenever he was in trouble.

This trio of peaks has a significant role in the town of Canmore, tourism, and hiking in the area. The Three Sisters may be the most recognized peaks in the Bow River Valley.

== History ==
In 1883, Albert Rogers, a nephew of Major A. B. Rogers, was the first settler to name the mountains when he saw the sides of the peaks covered in snow, resembling three praying nuns:

There had been quite a heavy snowstorm in the night, and when we got up in the morning and looked out of the tent I noticed each of the three peaks had a heavy veil of snow on the north side and I said to the boys, 'Look at the Three Nuns'.

Initially called the Three Nuns, they were later renamed the Three Sisters. This last name first appeared on George Mercer Dawson's 1886 map, which apparently found the name, and was more appropriate in a spirit of Protestantism.

Another story is that the first superintendent of Banff National Park, George Stewart, named it after his three daughters: Frances, Olive, and Grace.

== Peaks ==
Peak	metres	feet	Coordinates	First Ascent
Big Sister	2,936	9,632	51°00′50″N 115°21′00″W	1887
Middle Sister	2,769	9,084	51°01′00″N 115°20′00″W	1920
Little Sister	2,694	8,840	51°01′30″N 115°20′00″W	1925

Big Sister is a moderate scramble on southwestern slopes and is very steep while Middle Sister is an easy scramble from Stewart Creek. Little Sister is a more difficult ascent requiring technical climbing skills. The Three Sisters Traverse is an obscure and dangerous climb seldom done.

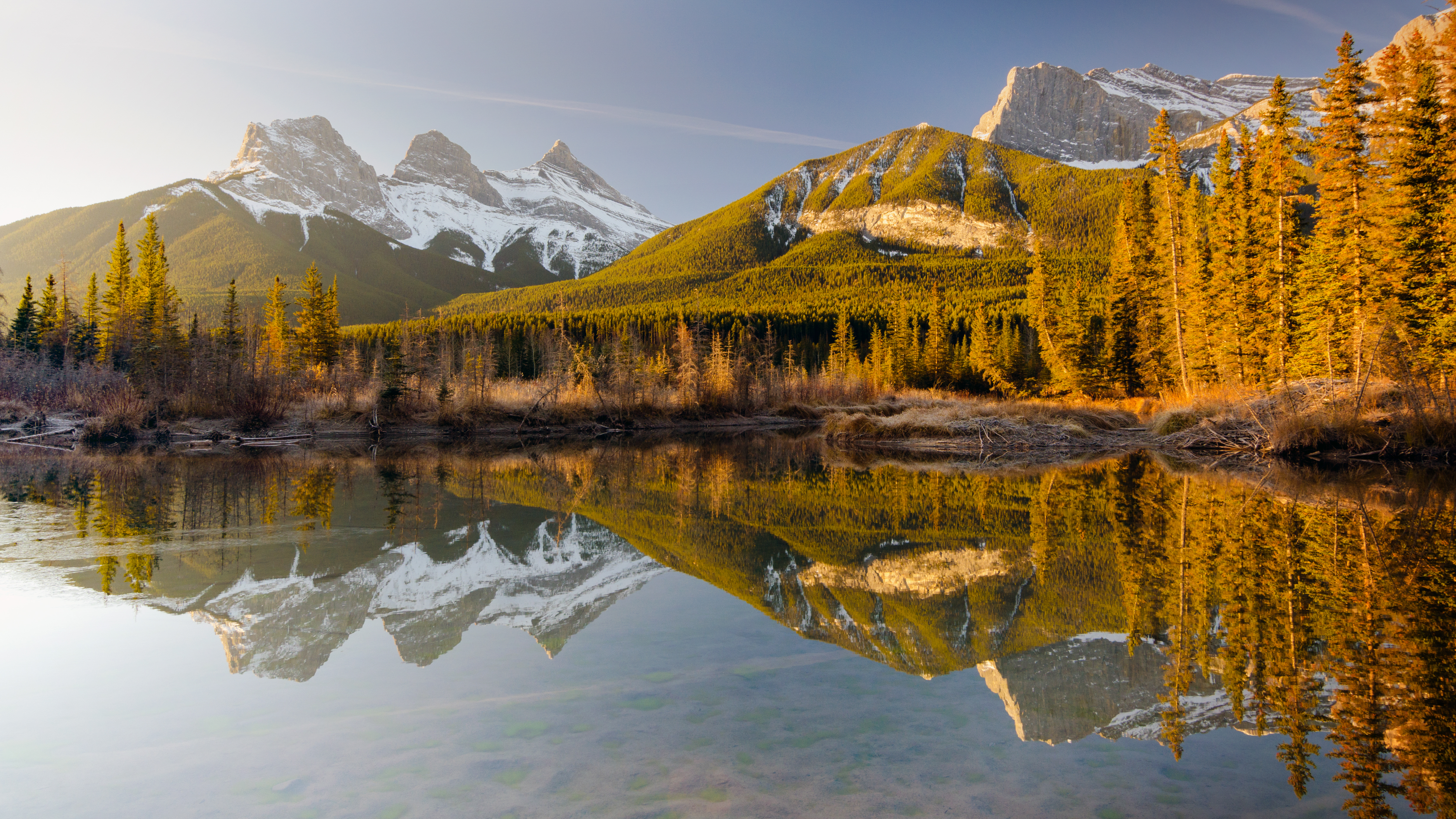
The Three Sisters after sunrise, reflected in the Bow River

== Local wildlife in surrounding area ==
Being located in the southern Canmore mountain area, there are several wildlife notorious for the area. Wildlife species include but are not limited to grizzly bears, wolverines, lynxes, wolves, cougars, elk, moose, and bighorn sheep. In particular, the grizzly bear, lynx, and wolverine are considered endangered in this region.

== Indigenous people in surrounding area ==
The Three Sisters mountain range is located near Canmore, AB. Canmore is located within the region of Treaty 7, which exists in Southern Alberta. Bearspaw First Nation, Chiniki First Nation, Goodstoney First Nation, Tsuut’ina First Nation, and Blackfoot Confederacy exist within Treaty 7. These nations form the Stoney Nakoda. Canmore is also in Region 3, home of the Métis Nation of Alberta.

== Nearby mountain ranges and significant locations ==
- Cascade Mountain
- Heart Mountain
- Mount Rundle
- Lake Louise
- Ha Ling Peak
- Mount Yamnuska

== Scenic trails ==
This list contains different trails in Canmore and Banff Provincial Park to view the Three Sisters and other mountains known in Canmore.

- Policemans Creek Boardwalk Trail - This trail is 2.6 miles long and will take roughly 1 hour and 1 minute to hike.
- Highline Trail and Three Sisters Pathway - This trail is 6.1 miles long and will take roughly 3 hours and 22 minutes to hike.
- Horseshoe Loop - This trail is 3.5 miles long and will take roughly 1 hour and 52 minutes to hike.
- Canmore Hoodoos Loop - This trail is 3.1 miles long and will take roughly 1 hour and 48 minutes to hike.
- Bechlands Ridge - This trail is 2.5 miles long and will take roughly 1 hour and 22 minutes to hike.
- Montane Traverse Trail - This trail is 8.0 miles long and will take roughly 4 hours and 47 minutes to hike.
