= Baker Creek (Alberta) =

Stream in Alberta, Canada

Coordinates: 51.35°N 116.06886°W

Baker Creek is a stream in Alberta, Canada.

Baker Creek has the name of an early figure in the local mining industry.

== See also ==
- List of rivers of Alberta
