= Ha Ling Peak =

Mountain in Canada

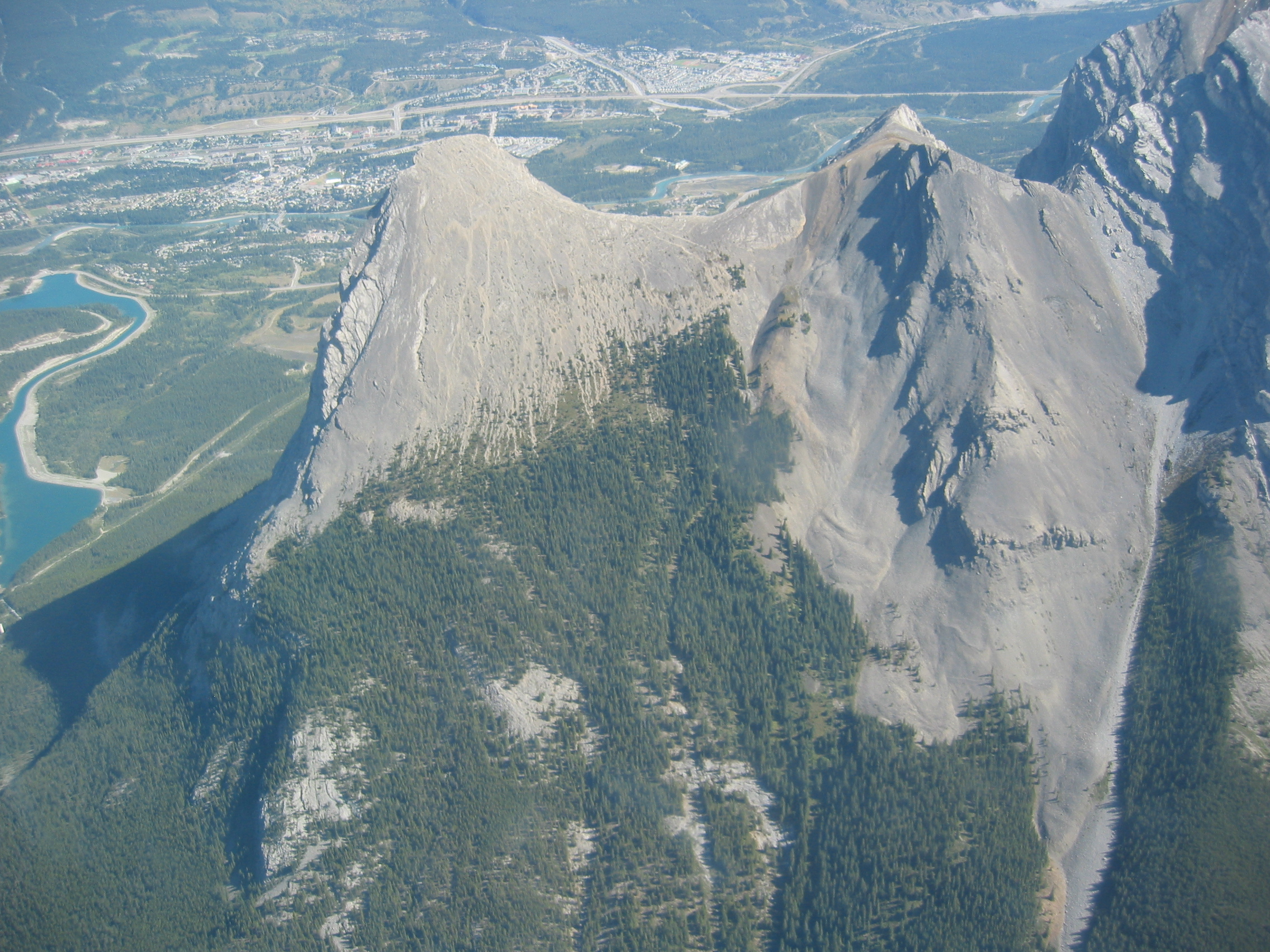
- Ha Ling Peak (leftmost), Miner's Col (middle), a section of Mount Lawrence Grassi (rightmost), and the town of Canmore viewed from the south (September 2006)

Highest point
- Elevation: 2,407 m (7,897 ft)
- Prominence: 31 m (102 ft)
- Listing: Mountains of Alberta
- Coordinates: 51°03′51″N 115°23′59″W

Geography
- Location within Alberta
- Interactive map of Ha Ling Peak
- Location: Alberta, Canada
- Parent range: Canadian Rockies
- Topo map: NTS 82O3 Canmore

Climbing
- Easiest route: easy scramble

Ha Ling Peak is a peak at the northwestern end of Ehagay Nakoda—a mountain located immediately south of the town of Canmore just east of the Spray Lakes road in Alberta's Canadian Rockies. It was previously named Chinaman's Peak, but the name was changed to be less offensive. It was the subject of a 2018 CBC Documentary titled 'Ha Ling Peak' that follows the controversy and renaming of the mountain.

== Origin of the name ==
The name of the mountain has been subject to much controversy. Originally, the mountain was referred to locally as The Beehive. In 1896, Ha Ling, a Chinese cook for the Canadian Pacific Railway (some say the Okaloosa Hotel in Canmore), was bet 50 dollars that he could not climb the peak and plant a flag on the summit in less than 10 hours. According to the Medicine Hat News of October 22, 1896, he started the ascent at 7:00 am the previous Saturday morning and was back in time for lunch. As nobody believed his story, he led a party of doubters to the summit where he planted a much larger flag beside the original, this one visible to the naked eye from Canmore. The townsfolk referred to the mountain as Chinaman's Peak in his honour.

The name Chinaman's Peak did not become official until 1980. In 1997, it was renamed Ha Ling Peak, as the term Chinaman was viewed as derogatory. The renaming of Ha Ling Peak is a part of a much larger project of renaming offensive or colonial names of mountains and place names in Alberta.

== Climbing routes ==
There is a hiking route up the south side. On the north side, there are several technical climbing routes up the face and a difficult scrambling route up Canmore Couloir, located between Mount Lawrence Grassi and Miner's Col. Beginning from the Goat Creek Day Use trailhead, the trail is maintained for 3.5km to the saddle. The final distance is unmaintained over loose, rocky terrain.

== Gallery ==
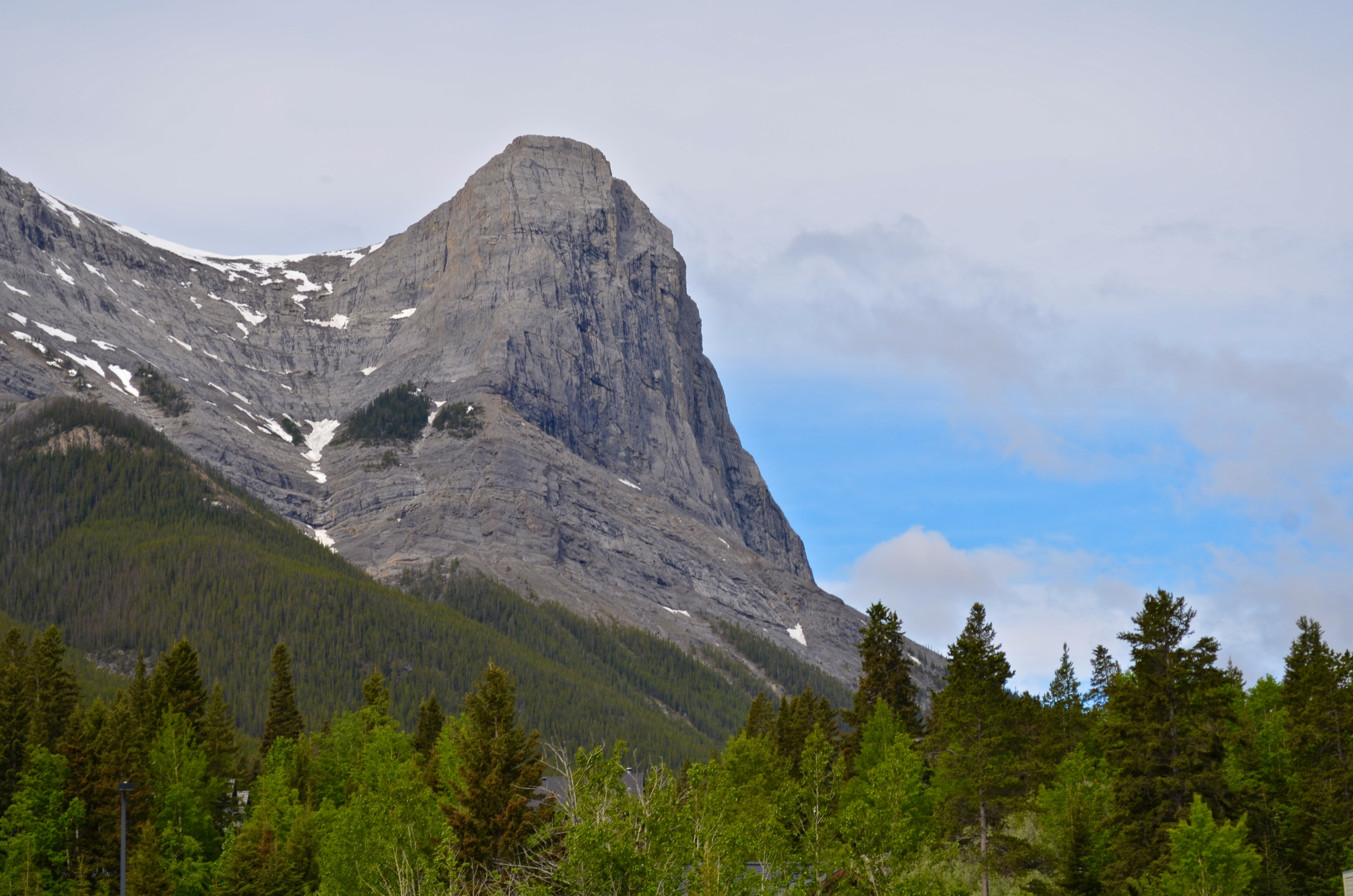
Ha Ling Peak

== See also ==
- Canmore Museum and Geoscience Centre
- Chinaman (term)
- List of mountains in the Canadian Rockies
- Negro Mountain
