= Grassi Lakes =

Group of lakes in Alberta, Canada

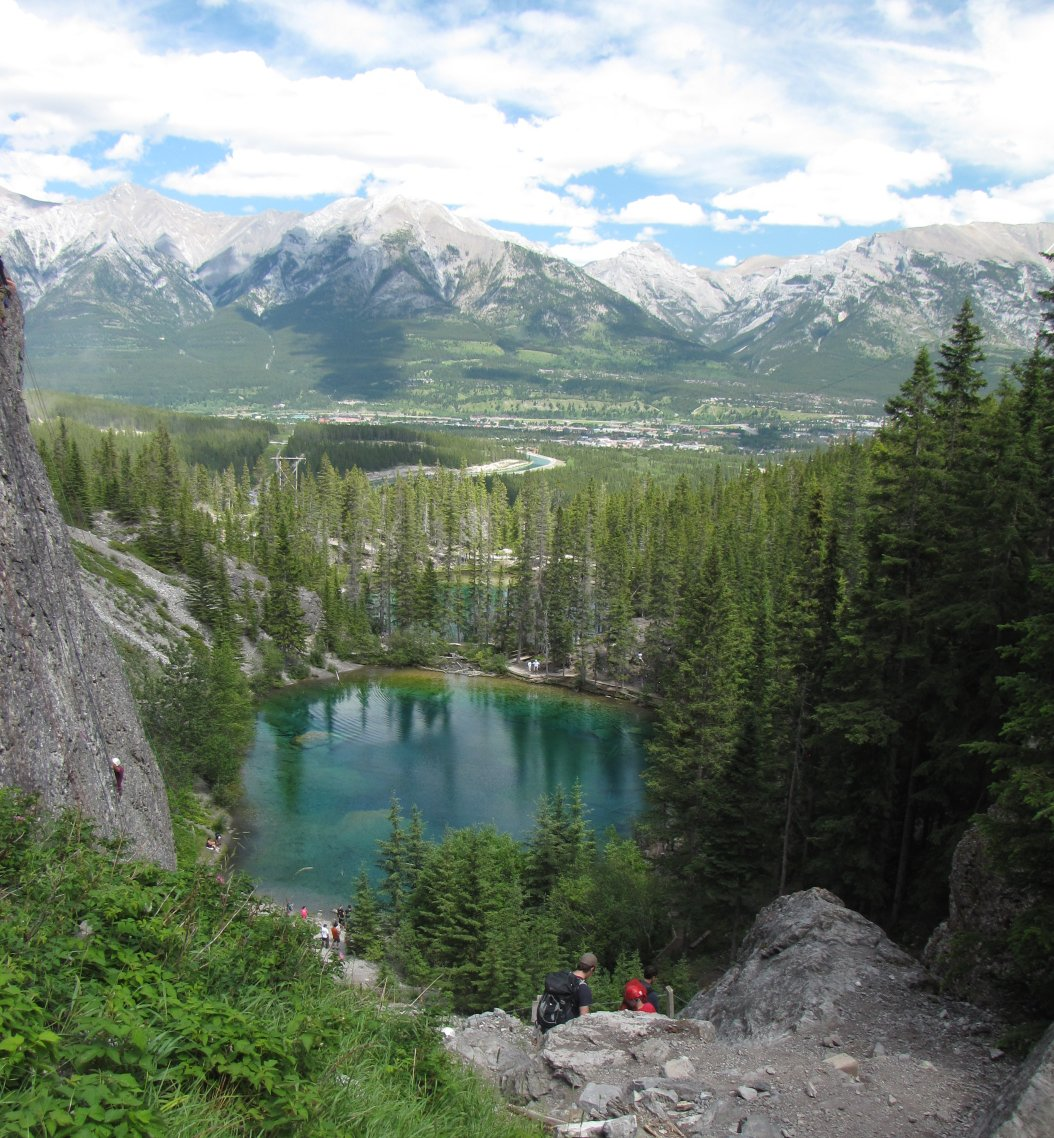
- The Upper and Lower Grassi Lakes, with the town of Canmore and the Bow River valley in the distance.

- Location within Alberta Location within Canada
- Location: Canmore Nordic Centre Provincial Park, Alberta
- Coordinates: 51.0722°N 115.4069°W
- Primary inflows: Spray River
- Primary outflows: Spray River
- Basin countries: Canada
- Surface elevation: 1,525 m (5,003 ft)

The Upper and Lower Grassi Lakes lie at an elevation of about 1,525 m (5,003 ft) in the southern Canadian Rockies overlooking the town of Canmore, Alberta. They receive their water from the Spray Lakes Reservoir on the Spray River. The land is part of the Canmore Nordic Centre Provincial Park, which is part of the Kananaskis Country park system.

The lakes are named after Lawrence Grassi, who emigrated to Canada in 1912. After working for the Canadian Pacific Railway for several years, he began work as a miner in the Canmore coal mines in 1916. Grassi went on to become a well-respected climbing guide and built many trails in the area, including the one to the Grassi Lakes that bear his name.

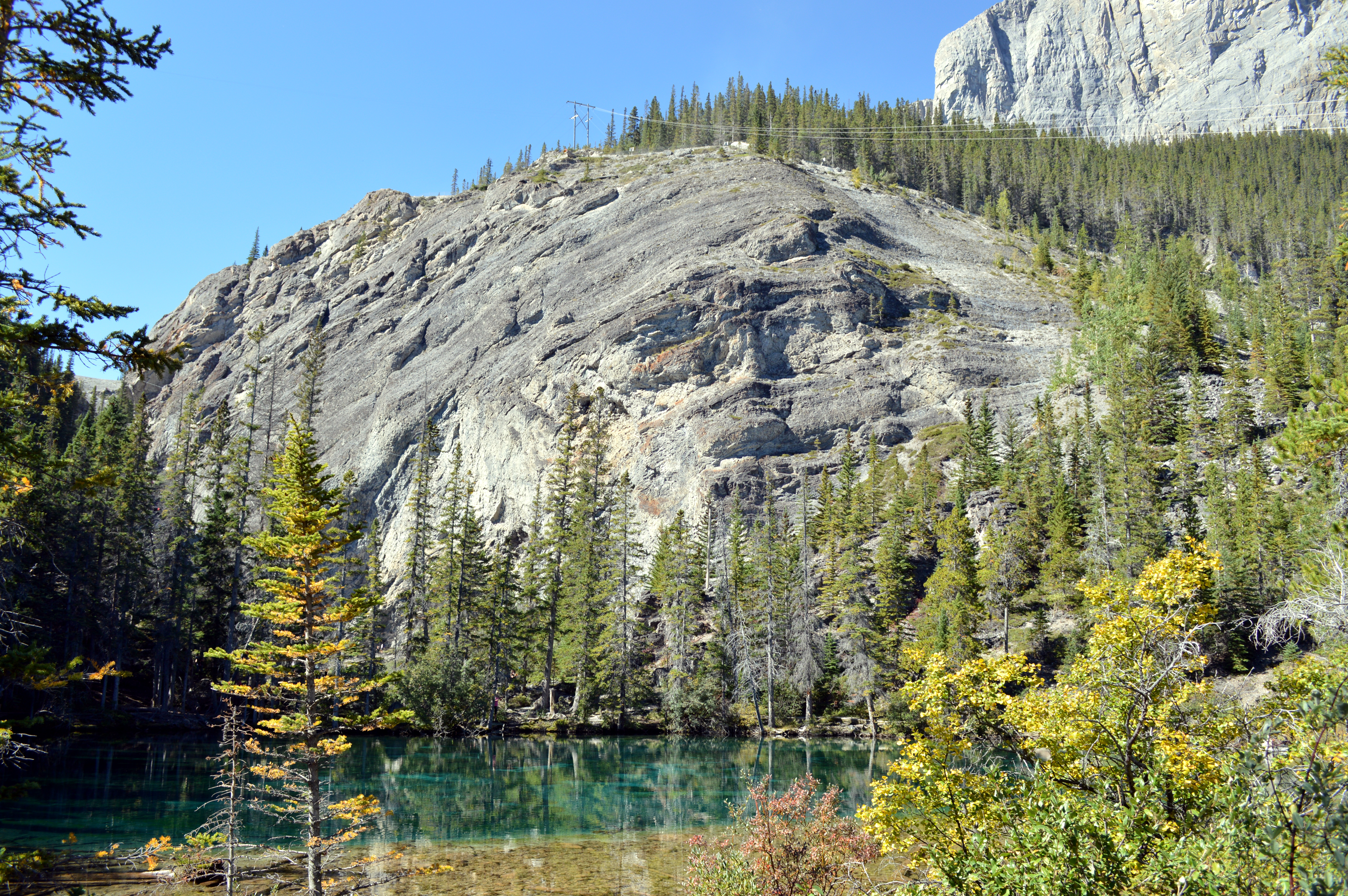
Lower Grassi Lake.

The small, emerald-colored Grassi Lakes are a popular destination for hikers and rock climbers. They lie at the foot of grey cliffs that are about 75 m (246 ft) high. The cliffs are part of the Cairn Formation, a fossil reef that formed during the Late Devonian period. The primary reef-forming organisms were stromatoporoids, a long-extinct type of bulbous sponge. The cliff is a favorite of rock climbers who use the pockets left by the sponges as hand- and foot-holds.

Rock paintings that are more than 1,000 years old can be found near the top of the canyon beyond the lakes. They are believed to have been painted by Kutenai ancestors.

== See also ==
- Lakes in Alberta
