= Canmore, Alberta =

Town in Alberta, Canada

Canmore Chuwapchipchiyan Kude Bi (Stoney)
- Town
- Town of Canmore
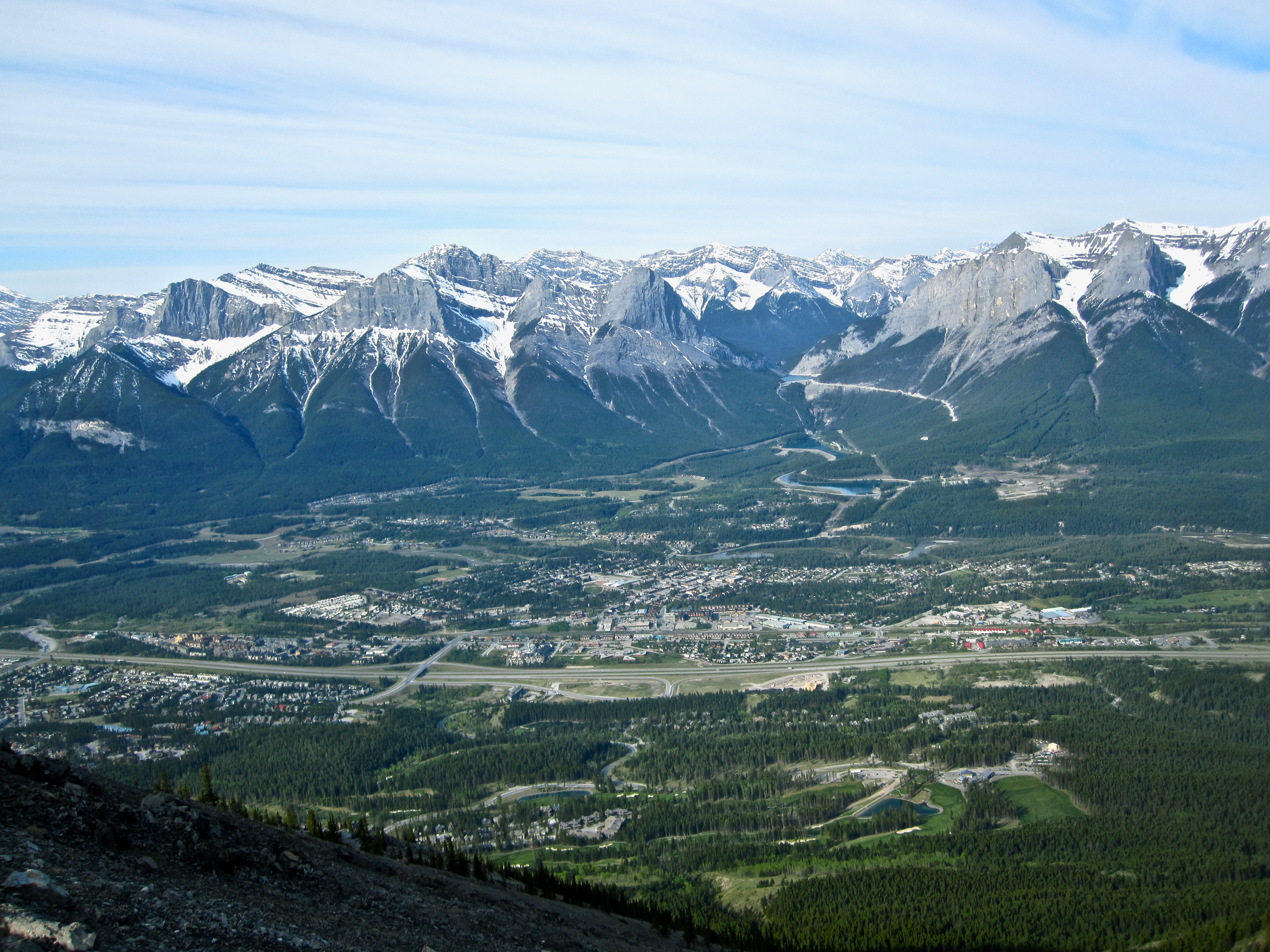
- Canmore from Mount Lady Macdonald in May 2009

- Flag Logo
- Nickname: Queen Town of the Rockies
- Town boundaries

- Location in Alberta Canmore (Alberta)
- Coordinates: 51°05′18″N 115°20′52″W
- Country: Canada
- Province: Alberta
- Region: Alberta's Rockies
- Adjacent Improvement districts: Improvement District No. 9 and Kananaskis Improvement District
- Founded: 1884
- Incorporated
  - Village: January 1, 1965
  - Town: June 1, 1966
- Founder: Donald Alexander Smith, 1st Lord Strathcona and Mount Royal.
- Named for: Malcolm III King of Scots 1034- 1093, otherwise known as Malcolm Canmore.

Government
  - Mayor: Sean Krausert
  - Governing body: Canmore town council: Jeff Mah; Tanya Forbet; Joanna McCallum; Jeff Hilstad; Karen Marra; Wade Graham
  - CAO: Sally Caudill
  - MP: William Stevenson (CPC)
  - MLA: Sarah Elmeligi (NDP)

Area (2021)
  - Land: 68.47 km^{2} (26.44 sq mi)
  - Urban: 12.96 km^{2} (5.00 sq mi)
- Highest elevation: 1,480 m (4,860 ft)
- Lowest elevation: 1,375 m (4,511 ft)

Population (2021)
  - Town: 15,990
  - Density: 233.5/km^{2} (605/sq mi)
  - Urban: 13,268
  - Urban density: 1,023.7/km^{2} (2,651/sq mi)
  - Metro: 17,114 (129th)
  - Municipal census (2014): 13,077
  - Estimate (2020): 14,798
- Time zone: UTC−06:00 (Alberta Time)
- Forward sortation area: T1W
- Area codes: +1-403, +1-587
- Highways: Highway 1 (TCH) Trans-Canada Highway; Highway 1A; Highway 742
- Waterways: Bow River
- Public Transit Service: Roam
- Website: www.canmore.ca

Canmore is a town in Alberta, Canada, located approximately 81 kilometres (50 mi) west of Calgary near the southeast boundary of Banff National Park. It is located in the Bow Valley within Alberta's Rocky Mountains. The town shares a border with Kananaskis Country to the west and south and the Municipal District of Bighorn No. 8 to the north and east. With a population of 17,036 in 2023, Canmore is the fifth-largest town in Alberta.

== History ==
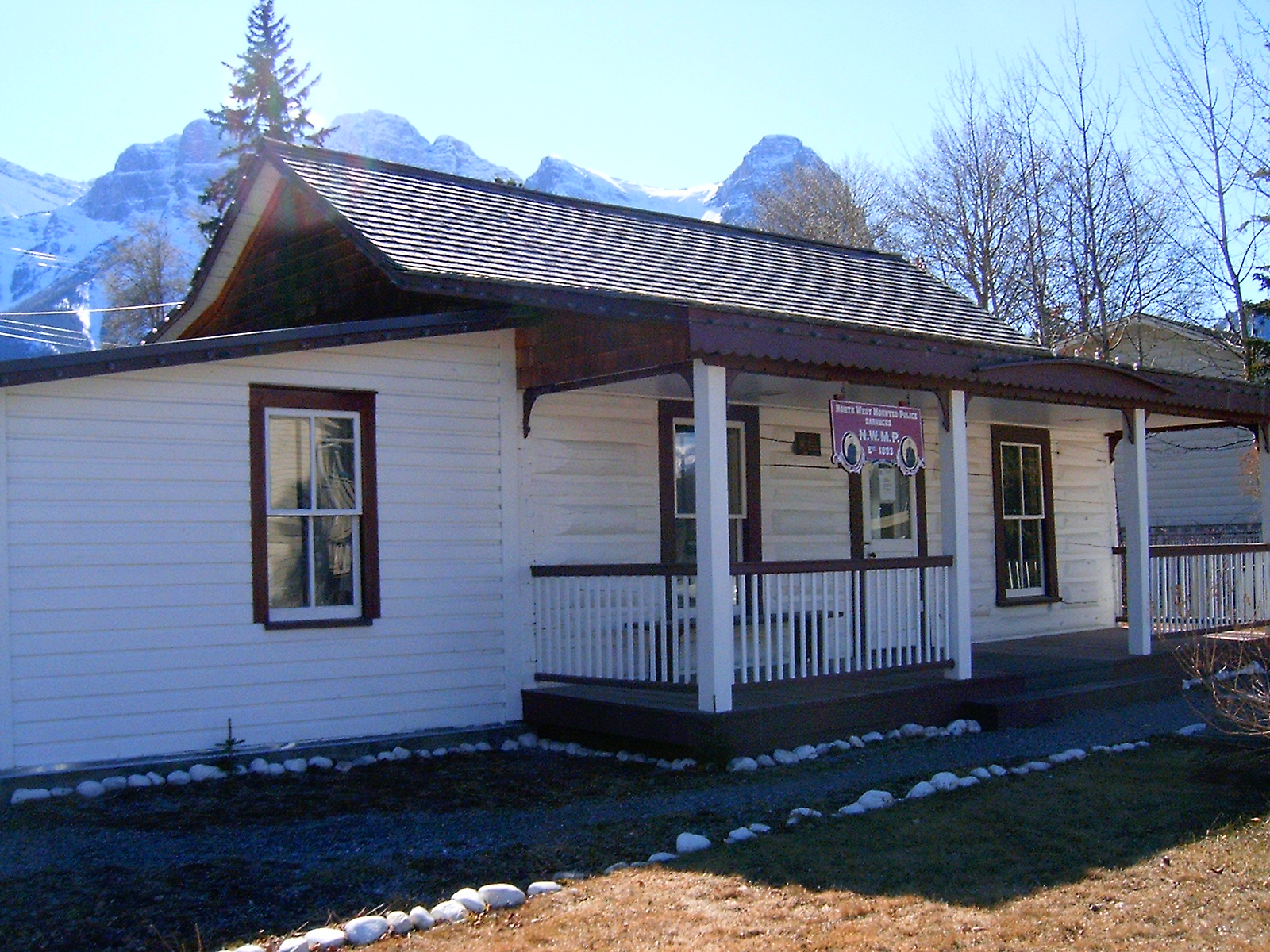
North-West Mounted Police barrack

Canmore was officially named in 1884 by Canadian Pacific Railway director Donald A. Smith (later 1st Baron Strathcona and Mount Royal). It was named after Malcolm III of Scotland who was also nicknamed Canmore. The name Canmore originates from the Gaelic ceann mòr, meaning "Big Chief".

In 1886, Queen Victoria granted a coal mining charter to the town, and the No. 1 mine was opened in 1887.

By the 1890s, a North-West Mounted Police barrack had been instated on Main Street, however, it was vacated in 1927. The building was restored in 1989 and it is under the care of the Canmore Museum and Geoscience Centre.

The coal mining industry in Canmore boomed well into the 20th century. In 1965, with a population of 2,000, Canmore was incorporated as a town. By the 1970s, the market for coal was diminished, and in 1979 Canmore Mines Ltd. ceased operations. As a result of safety and reclamation policies instigated by the province of Alberta, all but a few mining structures were demolished in the following year; only the lamp house and a few mine entrances remain today.

Canmore's economic future seemed dismal until the announcement in the early 1980s that Calgary would be hosting the 1988 Winter Olympics, and that Canmore would play host to the Nordic events. This resulted in an increase in tourism, and Canmore began to develop into the recreational tourist destination it is today.

The Canmore Hotel was built in 1890 on the main street. In 2015, the building received a heritage designation and was being renovated to restore it. The hotel celebrated its 120th anniversary in October 2010.

Canmore is known by the Nakoda people as Chuwapchipchiyan Kude Bi. Applications requesting that this be made an official name have thus far been unsuccessful.

== Geography ==
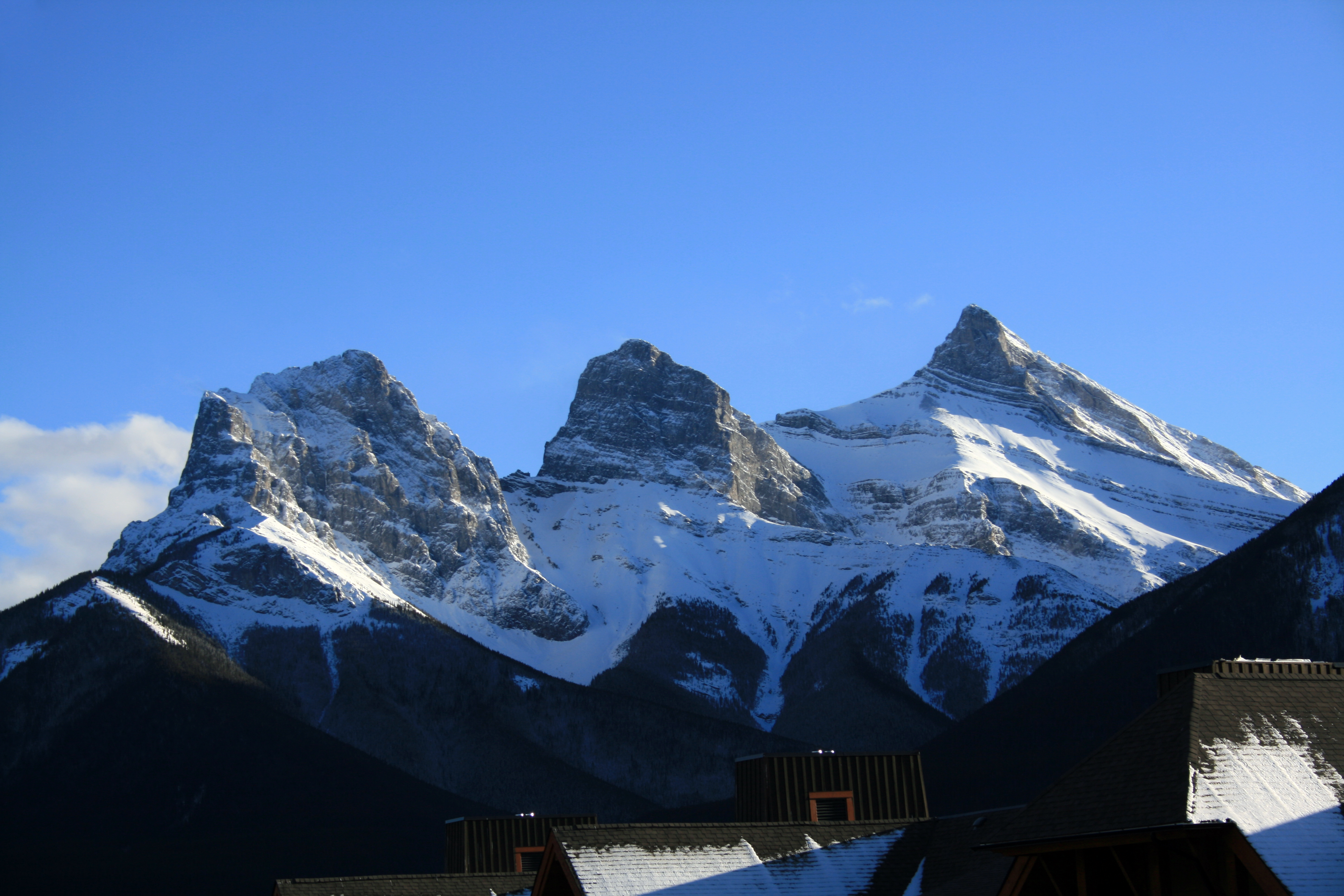
Three Sisters Rocky Mountains viewed from Canmore, Alberta

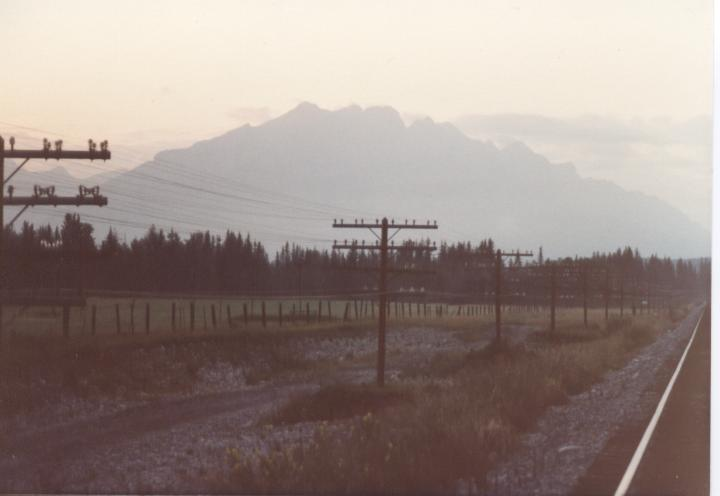
Cascade Mountain from Canmore

Concerns over Canmore's urban growth adjacent to provincial and national parkland has led to many efforts to place a limit on future development. The town was at one time expected to reach its maximum "build out" following the completion of Silvertip Resort and Three Sisters Mountain Village developments by 2020, but developers have continued the push for permits to construct additional housing. In 2021 the developers of the Three Sisters Mountain Village project sued the town of Canmore for $161 million over a decision that prevented them from building the project. In May 2022, the Land and Property Rights Tribunal of Alberta overruled town officials and ordered that development for the two projects can proceed to completion.

Bisected by the Trans-Canada Highway, located on the Canadian Pacific Kansas City railway and run through by the Bow River, Canmore is ideally situated on a number of major transportation routes, which has influenced its tourism-based economy and historical mining industry.

Much of the Canmore area has been designated a wildlife corridor. This corridor allows animals such as bears, cougars, wolves, and elk to move between habitat patches, where they can find food, escape predators, breed, give birth, and establish territories.

Despite its modest population and environmentally friendly image, Canmore is highly sprawled and segmented (due to wildlife corridors, highways, the railway, and the Bow River) and takes over one and a half hours to traverse on foot. The pedestrian-friendly town centre surrounds 8th Street, or "Main Street" (as it is known colloquially), which was originally a residential road with some of the oldest architecture in the town; now, however, it is lined with small shops, restaurants, and galleries. Much of the recent development is taking place in Three Sisters Mountain Village, Silvertip Resort, and around the town centre.

A series of hiking, mountain biking, equestrian, and paved trails traverse the Canmore area. Major trail systems are located on the Benchlands of Mount Lady Macdonald, at the Canmore Nordic Centre, and along the north slope of Mount Lawrence Grassi. Many of these trails, and others around the community, are located within Bow Valley Wildland Provincial Park and Kananaskis Country. Some of these, including the Montaine Traverse Trail and the Highline Trail, have been improved by the Town of Canmore, the Government of Alberta, the Municipal District of Bighorn No. 8, and various stakeholders (Bow Valley Mountain Bike Alliance, the B.V. Riding Association, and local hiking groups) in order to balance recreational opportunities with environmental sustainability. Much of the upgrading has been accomplished by volunteers organized by the Trail Care Program of The Friends of Kananaskis Country.

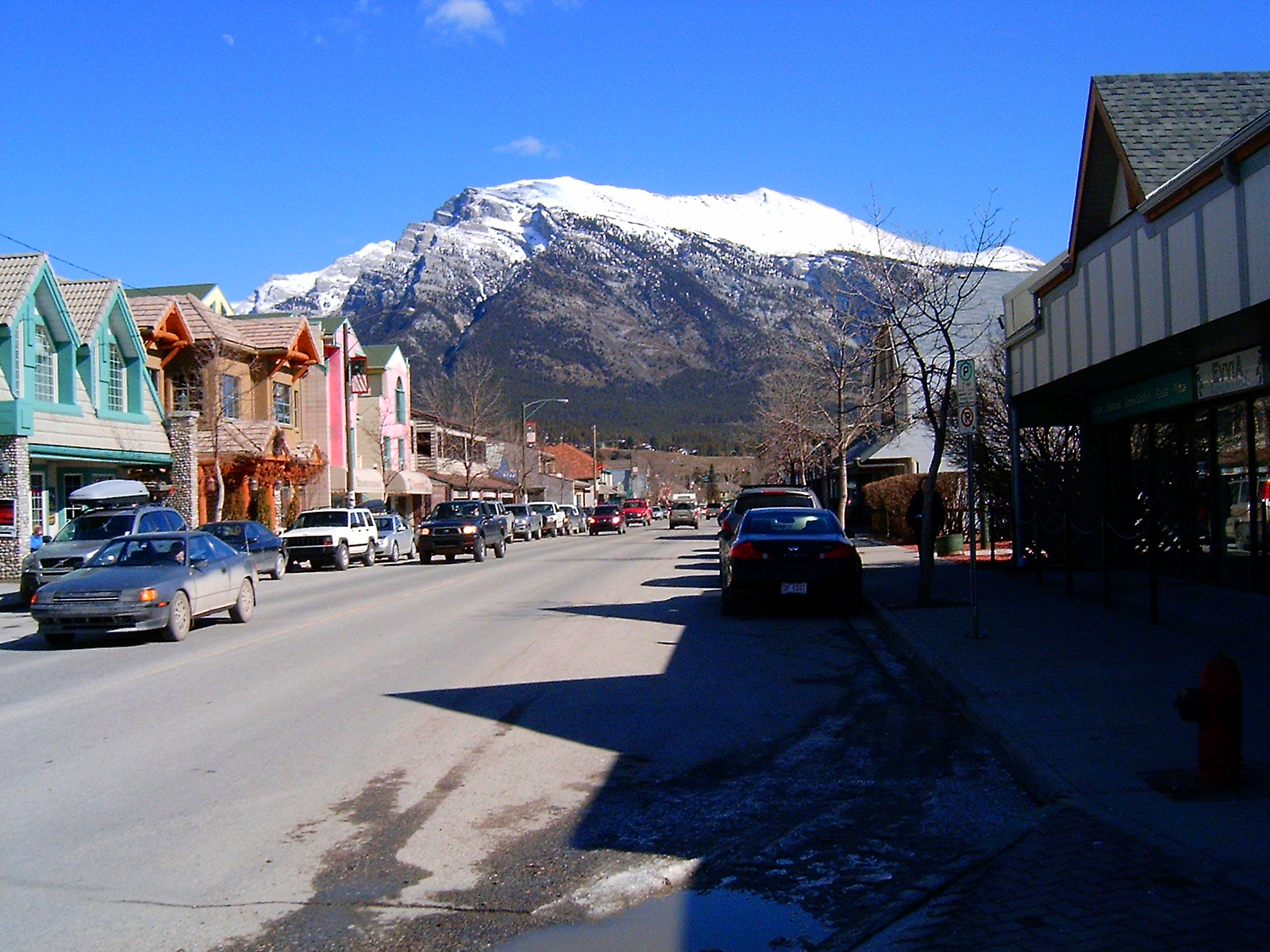
Mainstreet Canmore

Mountains located adjacent to and visible from the townsite are:

- Mount Rundle (2,949 metres (9,675 ft))
  - East End of Rundle
- Mount Lawrence Grassi (2,685 m / 8,809 ft)
  - Ha Ling Peak (2,407 metres (7,897 ft))
- Three Sisters (2,936 m, 2,769 m, 2,694 m or 9,633 ft, 9,084 ft, 8,839 ft)
- Grotto Mountain (2,706 m / 8,878 ft)
- Mount Lady Macdonald (2,606 m / 8,550 ft)

=== Climate ===
Canmore's climate is relatively mild compared to some other regions of Alberta. It does not have an Environment Canada weather observation station, but the nearby town of Banff has an average high of −3.1 °C (26 °F) in January, with relatively low humidity. Summers are short with daytime temperatures ranging from 18 to 22 °C (64 to 72 °F).

== Demographics ==
Federal census population history
Year	Pop.	±%
1901	450	—
1911	754	+67.6%
1941	1,078	+43.0%
1951	1,504	+39.5%
1956	1,379	−8.3%
1961	1,736	+25.9%
1966	1,445	−16.8%
1971	1,538	+6.4%
1976	1,927	+25.3%
1981	3,484	+80.8%
1986	4,182	+20.0%
1991	5,681	+35.8%
1996	8,354	+47.1%
2001	10,792	+29.2%
2006	12,039	+11.6%
2011	12,288	+2.1%
2016	13,992	+13.9%
2021	15,990	+14.3%
Source: Statistics Canada

In the 2021 Census of Population conducted by Statistics Canada, the Town of Canmore had a population of 15,990 living in 6,804 of its 9,173 total private dwellings, a change of 14.3% from its 2016 population of 13,992. With a land area of 68.47 km^{2} (26.44 sq mi), it had a population density of 233.5/km^{2} (604.8/sq mi) in 2021.

In the 2016 Census of Population conducted by Statistics Canada, the Town of Canmore recorded a population of 13,992 living in 5,738 of its 7,963 total private dwellings, a 13.9% change from its 2011 population of 12,288. With a land area of 69.43 km^{2} (26.81 sq mi), it had a population density of 201.5/km^{2} (522.0/sq mi) in 2016.

The population of the Town of Canmore according to its 2014 municipal census is 13,077, a 6% change from its 2011 municipal census population of 12,317.

=== Ethnicity ===
About 1.5% of residents identified themselves as aboriginal at the time of the 2006 census.

Panethnic groups in the Town of Canmore (2001−2021)
Panethnic group	2021		2016		2011		2006		2001	
Panethnic group	Pop.	%	Pop.	%	Pop.	%	Pop.	%	Pop.	%
European (Note: Statistic includes all persons that did not make up part of a visible minority or an indigenous identity.)	13,065	84.15%	12,160	89.54%	10,725	89.41%	11,110	92.47%	10,185	94.97%
East Asian (Note: Statistic includes total responses of "Chinese", "Korean", and "Japanese" under visible minority section on census.)	665	4.28%	410	3.02%	415	3.46%	565	4.7%	300	2.8%
Southeast Asian (Note: Statistic includes total responses of "Filipino" and "Southeast Asian" under visible minority section on census.)	635	4.09%	480	3.53%	275	2.29%	70	0.58%	30	0.28%
Indigenous	410	2.64%	250	1.84%	280	2.33%	180	1.5%	110	1.03%
South Asian	400	2.58%	110	0.81%	135	1.13%	65	0.54%	30	0.28%
Latin American	185	1.19%	90	0.66%	75	0.63%	0	0%	0	0%
Middle Eastern (Note: Statistic includes total responses of "West Asian" and "Arab" under visible minority section on census.)	70	0.45%	10	0.07%	0	0%	0	0%	10	0.09%
African	55	0.35%	45	0.33%	70	0.58%	35	0.29%	60	0.56%
Other/multiracial (Note: Statistic includes total responses of "Visible minority, n.i.e." and "Multiple visible minorities" under visible minority section on census.)	60	0.39%	35	0.26%	15	0.13%	0	0%	20	0.19%
Total responses	15,525	97.09%	13,580	97.06%	11,995	97.62%	12,015	99.8%	10,725	99.38%
Total population	15,990	100%	13,992	100%	12,288	100%	12,039	100%	10,792	100%
Note: Totals greater than 100% due to multiple origin responses

=== Language ===
As recorded in the 2016 Census, about 81% of residents identified English as their first language. About 5% of the population identified French as their first language and 2% identified German as their first language.

== Economy ==
The Town of Canmore originally depended on the coal mines. The 1988 Winter Olympics revived the economy and set the grounds for a high-end bedroom and get-away community which would depend on construction and tourism income.

== Arts and culture ==
Canmore has one museum, the Canmore Museum and Geoscience Centre (CMAGS) located along 7th Ave & 9th St. in the Canmore Civic Centre. In 2006, the Museum entered a Fee for Service agreement with the Town of Canmore to "act as the custodian of the Town's heritage, maintaining and preserving its artifacts, archives and to build heritage and to interpret this heritage through exhibitions and interpretive programming for residents and visitors on a year-round basis".

The town has a large number of writers, and also of painters and photographers.

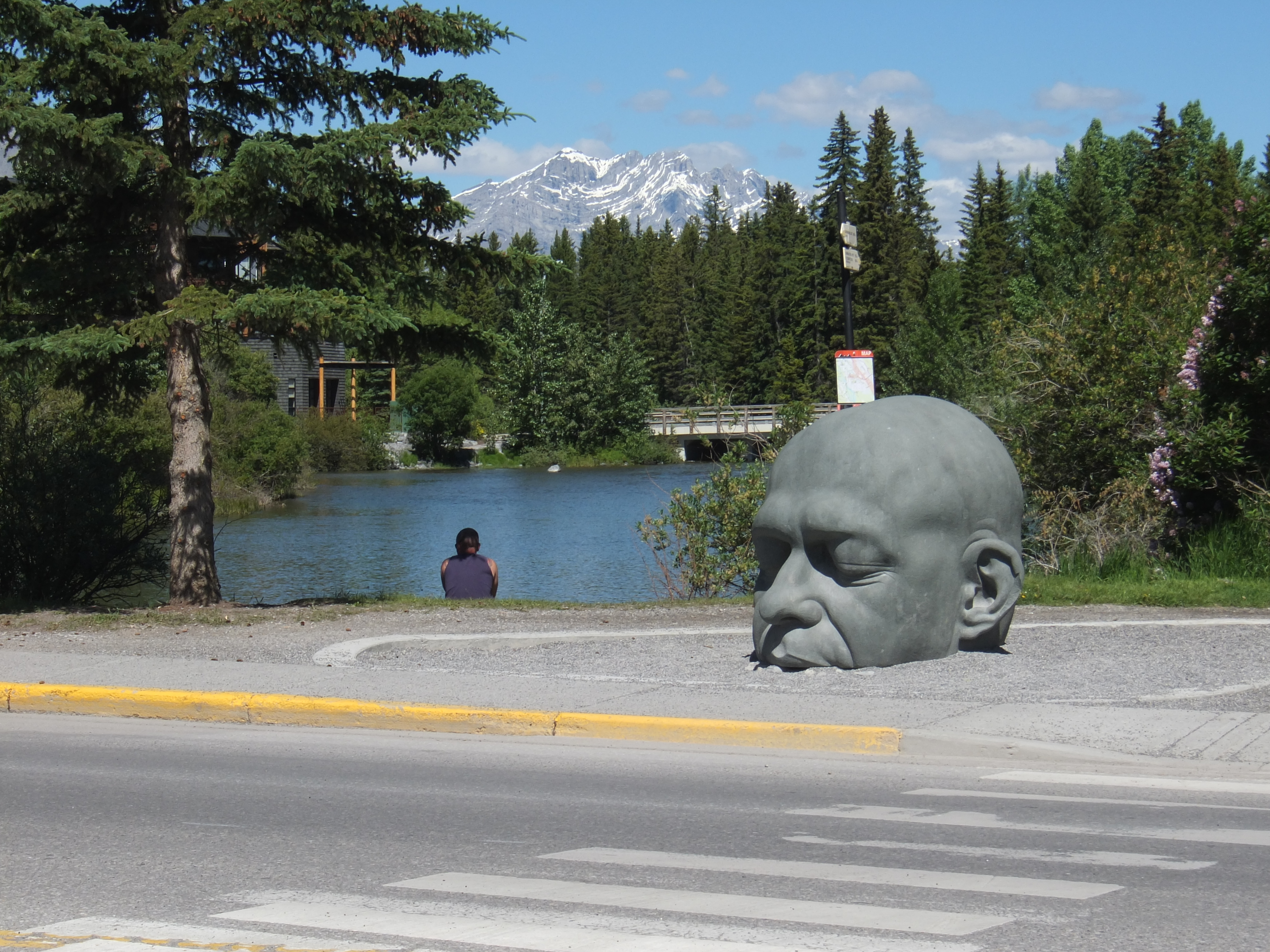
The Big Head sculpture in Canmore, located on main street north side of the bridge over Policeman's Creek

Many feature films and series have been shot in the Canmore area, including Brokeback Mountain, The Assassination of Jesse James by the Coward Robert Ford, Open Range, The Edge, Legends of the Fall, Shanghai Noon, Mystery Alaska, Snow Dogs, the pilot episode of Everwood, The Last of Us, Last of the Dogmen, and others. The town was also popularized by the late John Morgan of the Royal Canadian Air Farce with his monosyllabic character "Mike from Canmore".

=== Festivals and annual events ===
- The award-winning food festival, Canmore Uncorked, is hosted every April for 13 days of special set-price menus from local restaurants, culinary events, cooking courses, and a long table dinner.
- The 24 Hours of Adrenalin is a mountain bike race series held at a variety of locations across North America, with annual stops in Canmore. The race consists of hundreds of solo or team riders competing to ride as many laps as possible within 24 hours, on a challenging 16 km circuit at the Canmore Nordic Centre.
- The Canmore Winter Carnival is a celebration of the season and a popular community tradition for more than 20 years with events including ice carving, snow sculpting, dog sled racing, the Bonhomme Carnival, and more!
- The Rocky Mountain Ski Challenge is an annual ski marathon hosted by the Canmore Nordic Ski Club.
- The Rock and Fossil Clinic is co-presented by the Canmore Museum and Geoscience Centre (CMAGS) and APEGGA. Anyone can bring their rock or fossil find to have it evaluated by a professional geologist. The event is usually held in October.
- The Canmore Miners' Day Reunion takes place each year on the dates closest to the anniversary date of July 13 commemorating the closing of the Canmore coal mines in 1979. The occasion is marked with an evening reunion reception on Friday and on Saturday a parade, a free lunch for the public and a special picnic for ex-miners and their families.
- The Canmore Folk Music Festival is held annually on the Heritage Day long weekend in August at Centennial Park on the Stan Rogers Stage. The festival has played host to the likes of Ry Cooder, Stan Rogers, Arlo Guthrie, The Arrogant Worms, The Paperboys, The Rankin Family, Moxy Früvous, Oscar Lopez and many other notable artists. The Canmore Folk Music Festival is the longest running music festival in Alberta, and in 2007 celebrated its 30th year.
- The Canmore Highland Games are presented annually by the Three Sisters Scottish Society on the September long weekend. They are in their 17th year. The games host a ceilidh, heavy lifting competitions, piping and drumming, and highland dance events.
- Mozart on the Mountain is an outdoor concert presented annually by the Calgary Philharmonic Orchestra.
- The annual Festival of Eagles is a celebration of the golden eagle autumn migration over Canmore and the Bow Valley. The weekend celebration, currently in its 13th year, includes guided hikes, bird walks, interpretive displays, theatrical performances and guest speakers. Spotting scopes are set up at Canmore Collegiate High School.
- The Vic Lewis International Band Festival is held every November, starting in 1996. The festival hosts up to thirty-two concert bands, wind ensembles and jazz bands from across Alberta who play for some of the most well-known band directors in North America. Previous directors have included Tim Salzman, Paul Read, Gillian Mackay, and Tommy Banks. More than 800 students in junior high and high school bands perform for adjudicators, participate in workshops, listen to faculty recitals and give public performances during the two days and two nights of the festival. The festival takes place at Canmore Collegiate High School and the Canmore Recreation Centre with evening gala performances at the Oh Canada, Eh?! Theatre.
- The annual Canmore Children's Festival is a two-day event providing an array of children's entertainment, including acrobats, magicians, jugglers, music, theatre, storytelling, crafts, stilt-walking, dancing, face painting, and clowns.
- The Canmore ArtsPeak Arts Festival and the Canmore Winter Carnival give participants the opportunity to discover local venues such as the Octave featuring live music produced events, including the work of local artists and cinematographers.

== Attractions ==
=== Elevation Place ===
Elevation Place opened in April 2013 as Canmore's new recreation facility. Construction of the facility began in 2012 to go alongside the Canmore Recreation Centre (the community's old facility). The facility offers an 8-lane 25m lap pool, a world class climbing wall developed by Walltopia, two cardio rooms, a strength room, and a host of fitness programs. Elevation Place also houses the community's library and a local art gallery.

=== Canmore Nordic Centre ===
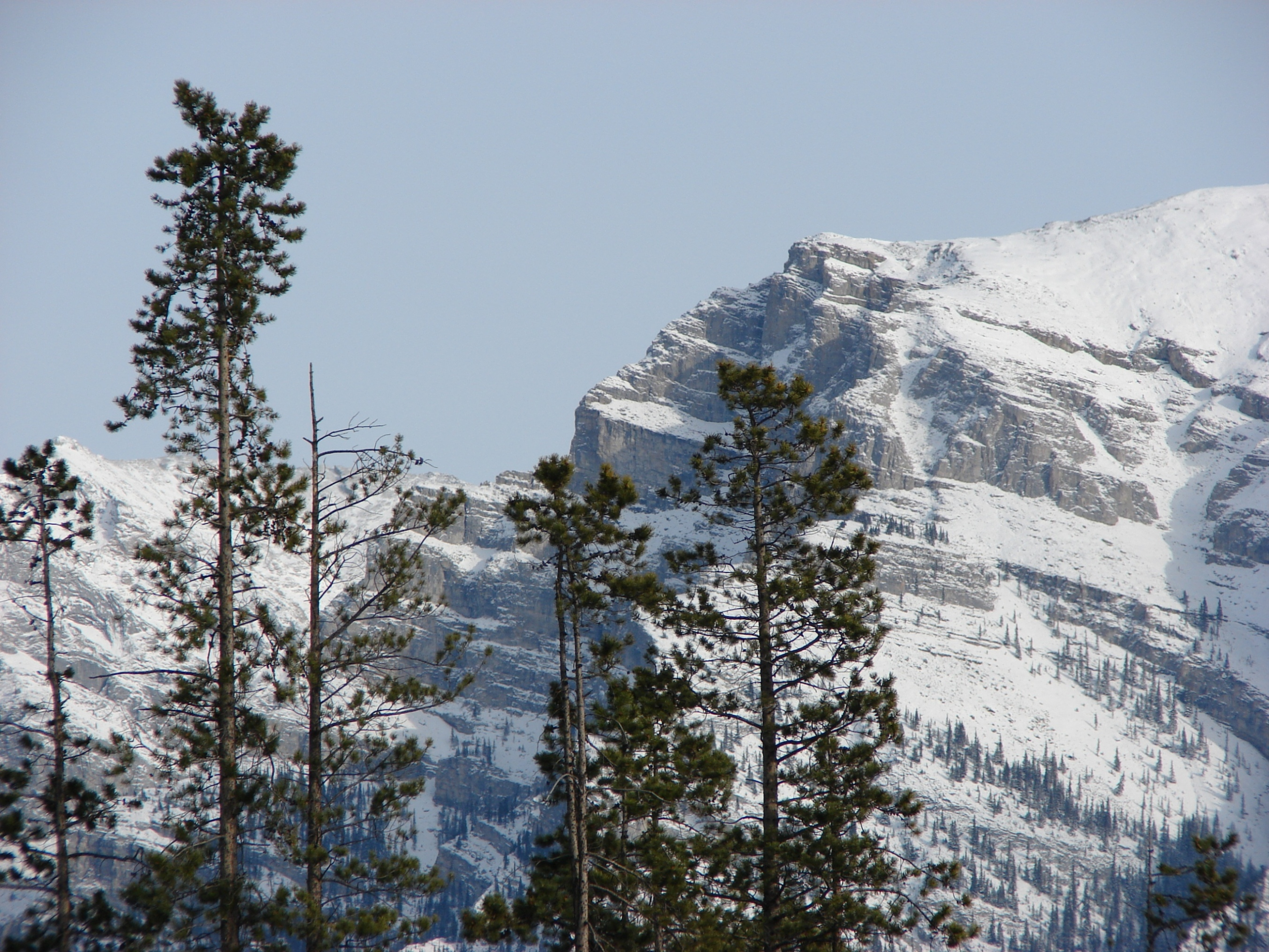
View across the Valley taken from The Nordic Centre

The Canmore Nordic Centre was originally constructed for the 1988 Winter Olympic Games. Cross-country skiing, biathlon, Nordic combined, and blind cross-country skiing events were held here. The Canmore Nordic Centre provides world-class trails for use by cross-country skiers, mountain bikers, unicyclists, trail runners, roller skiers, and hikers. It also has disc golf courses and orienteering. It has provincial park status and is administered by Alberta Parks. The centre was re-developed for the 2005 Cross-country World Cup and future international events. The Nordic Centre hosts national training camps for Canada's biathlon and cross-country ski teams, in addition to providing winter and summer recreational facilities to the general public. It has some 60 kilometres (37 mi) of world-class cross-country and biathlon trail systems designed to meet international Nordic competitive standards. The trails are groomed and track set to accommodate both classic and skating techniques on the same trail. A 6.5 kilometres (4.0 mi) track is illuminated for night skiing.

The Day Lodge at the Canmore Nordic Centre offers services such as a cafeteria, meeting rooms, maps and information, day lockers, showers, washrooms, equipment rentals, and lessons. During the summer months the Centre converts to include mountain biking facilities and plays host to several national and international mountain bike events annually. The Nordic Centre also operates an 18 "hole" disc golf course during the summer months.

=== Grassi Lakes ===
The Upper & Lower Grassi Lakes lie at an elevation of about 1,525 m in the southern Canadian Rockies overlooking the town of Canmore, Alberta. They receive their water from natural springs.

=== Banff National Park ===
Canmore is the closest major town to Banff National Park, the main gate of which is just northwest of the town limits. It is a 22-kilometre drive from Canmore to the park's main townsite at Banff.

== Sports ==
Climbing is popular with traditional, sport and multi-pitch climbs throughout the Bow Valley, and the area is a destination for ice climbing.

The local Alberta Junior Hockey League team is the Canmore Eagles. In 2001, Canmore resident and Eagles goalie "Double Blocker" Dan Blackburn, was drafted into the National Hockey League to play for the New York Rangers. The two-time Stanley Cup-winner Brayden Point has played for Eagles. The local Bantam hockey team is the Canmore Eagles. The hockey movie Mystery, Alaska (1999) was filmed in Canmore.

Canmore is the official home to the Canadian National cross-country skiing and biathlon teams. This, combined with the Canmore Nordic Centre has resulted in the town becoming a magnet for aspiring athletes in both sports. Full and part-time athletes can be seen training around town and in the local area all year around.

On February 22, 2006, Canmore local Chandra Crawford won the gold medal in the women's cross-country 1.1-kilometre sprint at the 2006 Winter Olympics in Turin, Italy. Beckie Scott, gold medalist in the women's cross country skiing pursuit race in the 2002 Winter Olympics in Salt Lake City, Utah also makes her home in Canmore.

The Canmore Nordic Centre is a destination for many large sporting events. During the summer season, mountain bike races (including the World 24 Hour championships in 2009 and the Canadian National Championships in 2010) are held there. During the winter season, the facility sees several cross-country ski races, ranging from local events to the FIS World Cup in 2005, 2008, 2009, 2012, and 2016.

Canmore United is the local soccer team, participating in the summer Bow Valley Soccer League, as well as tournaments in British Columbia, Saskatchewan and Alberta.

The Canmore Youth Skate Park was built in the summer of 2009.

There is a paved 26-km bicycle path going from Canmore to Banff. The path follows the highway, and is primarily a gentle uphill climb from Canmore to Banff. There is frequently a light wind blowing from Banff towards Canmore, and because of this fact and the elevation gain, the path is more strenuous going to Banff than is the return trip. In Canmore, there are several shops at which bicycles can be rented, including Chateau Mountain Sports.

== Media ==
The primary newspapers for the town are the Rocky Mountain Outlook and the Bow Valley Crag and Canyon which took over the Canmore Leader and the Banff Crag & Canyon in 2013. The only radio station operating out of Canmore is CHMN-FM, an adult contemporary station run by Rogers Media. Former Much Music VJ, Bradford How was employed by the Rogers owned, Mountain FM (broadcast at 106.5 FM) before he won the MuchMusic VJ Search competition in 2000.

== Housing ==
Many of the new developments, fractional projects, and vacation suites were built with sustainable development in mind, and in 2006 the Three Sisters Mountain Village development was the recipient of an international award for being the best sustainable development in North America. Unfortunately, new owners of the 'future land assets' of this project defaulted on their financial commitments following the world economic crisis, putting the future development lands into receivership in the spring of 2009, but this does not affect current developments that are ongoing within the project and long-term development will eventually continue under new ownership. In early 2010, several projects are beginning to show signs of life, and real estate pricing has begun to recover.

As of June 2014 Canmore has the lowest vacancy rate in Canada for rental properties according to a CMHC Spring report. This in turn is having an effect on the housing market and pushing prices up. Along with the uptick in the oil industry and second home buyers coming back into the market from Calgary, the housing market is showing signs of not only recovering but becoming very strong as inventory levels are at a 6-year low.

Within the town, there are also some buildings using geothermal energy, and the town's new Municipal Services Building is the first building in Alberta to achieve LEED Silver certification status.

However, due to the local landscape being very complex, not everyone can install solar or wind energy devices on their property. Bylaws are also very strict and "aesthetic alterations" are not widely accepted.

Canmore is a very difficult place to find affordable housing, and pet owners or families may have difficulty arranging accommodation. To alleviate the housing crunch, Canmore has pursued several affordable housing projects. In 2000, the Town of Canmore established the Canmore Community Housing Corporation (CCHC) to provide housing solutions for a healthy and balanced community. CCHC administers a Perpetually Affordable Housing (PAH) Program consisting of 41 ownership and 60 rental housing units at below-market purchase prices and rental rates. Mountain Haven Co-operative Homes Ltd. administers its own PAH development that provides 44 equity and non-equity (lease to own) units.

== Infrastructure ==
Health care is provided at the Canmore General Hospital.

Transit is provided by Roam transit.

== Notable people ==
- Paige Cooper, Canadian writer
- Brian McKeever (1979), paralympic skier and biathlete, Olympic medallist
- Chandra Crawford (1983), cross-country skier
- Sarah Murphy (1988), biathlete
- Rosanna Crawford (1988), biathlete
- Tristan Tafel (1990), freestyle skier
- Macx Davies (1992), biathlete
- Connor Howe (2000), speed skater
- Percy Jackson (1906–1972), ice hockey goaltender
- Noah Philp (1998), and Luke Philp (1995) professional ice hockey players
- Timmy Man (2010), Oliver Robins (2010), and Charlie Kestle (2010), musicians, The Ducks

== Films and other productions shot at Canmore ==
- The Last of Us
- The hockey movie Mystery, Alaska
- Last of the Dogmen
- The Amazing Race Canada 8, Episode 4
- Canada's Ultimate Challenge Season 2, Episode 5
- Top Chef: Destination Canada (Season 22), Episode 12

== See also ==
- List of cities in Canada by elevation
- List of communities in Alberta
- List of francophone communities in Alberta
- List of towns in Alberta
