= Princess Margaret Mountain =

Mountain in Alberta, Canada

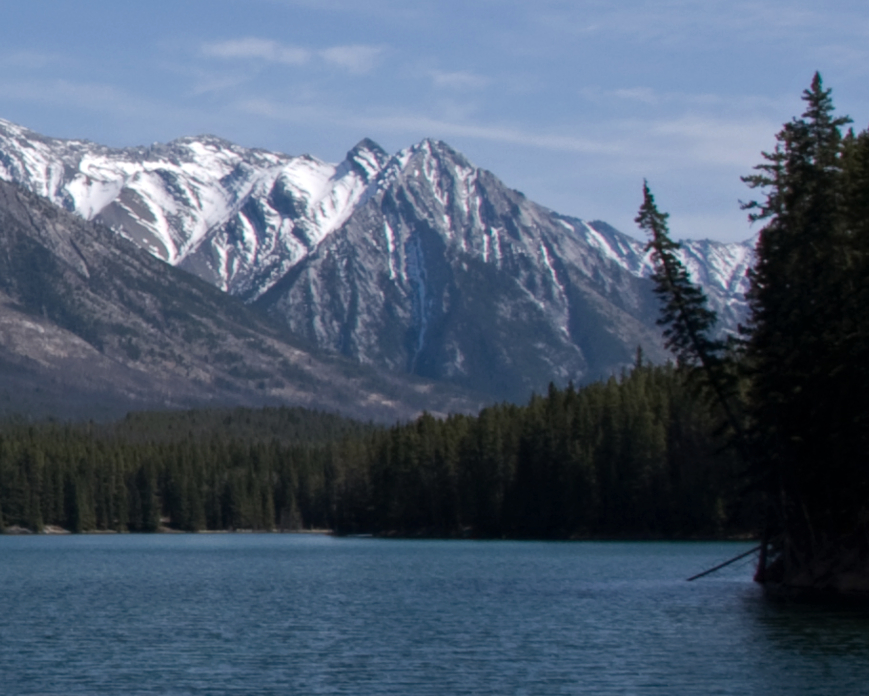
- Lake Minnewanka and Princess Margaret Mountain

Highest point
- Elevation: 2,515 m (8,251 ft)
- Prominence: 38 m (125 ft)
- Parent peak: Mount Charles Stewart 2809 m
- Listing: Mountains of Alberta
- Coordinates: 51°09′32″N 115°22′08″W

Geography
- Location within Alberta
- Location: Alberta, Canada
- Parent range: Fairholme Range; Canadian Rockies
- Topo map: NTS 82O3 Canmore

Climbing
- Easiest route: rock climb

Princess Margaret Mountain is a mountain located in the Bow River valley of Banff National Park, 2.5 km (1.6 mi) west of Mount Charles Stewart.

The mountain was named in 1958 after Princess Margaret (sister of Queen Elizabeth II), who had visited Banff and spent a night in a location near the mountain.

== Geology ==
The mountain is composed of sedimentary rock laid down from the Precambrian to Jurassic periods. Formed in shallow seas, this sedimentary rock was pushed east and over the top of younger rock during the Laramide orogeny.

== Climate ==
Based on the Köppen climate classification, it is located in a subarctic climate with cold, snowy winters, and mild summers. Temperatures in winter can drop below −20 °C (−4 °F) with wind chill factors below −30 °C (−22 °F). Weather conditions during summer months are optimum for climbing.

== Gallery ==
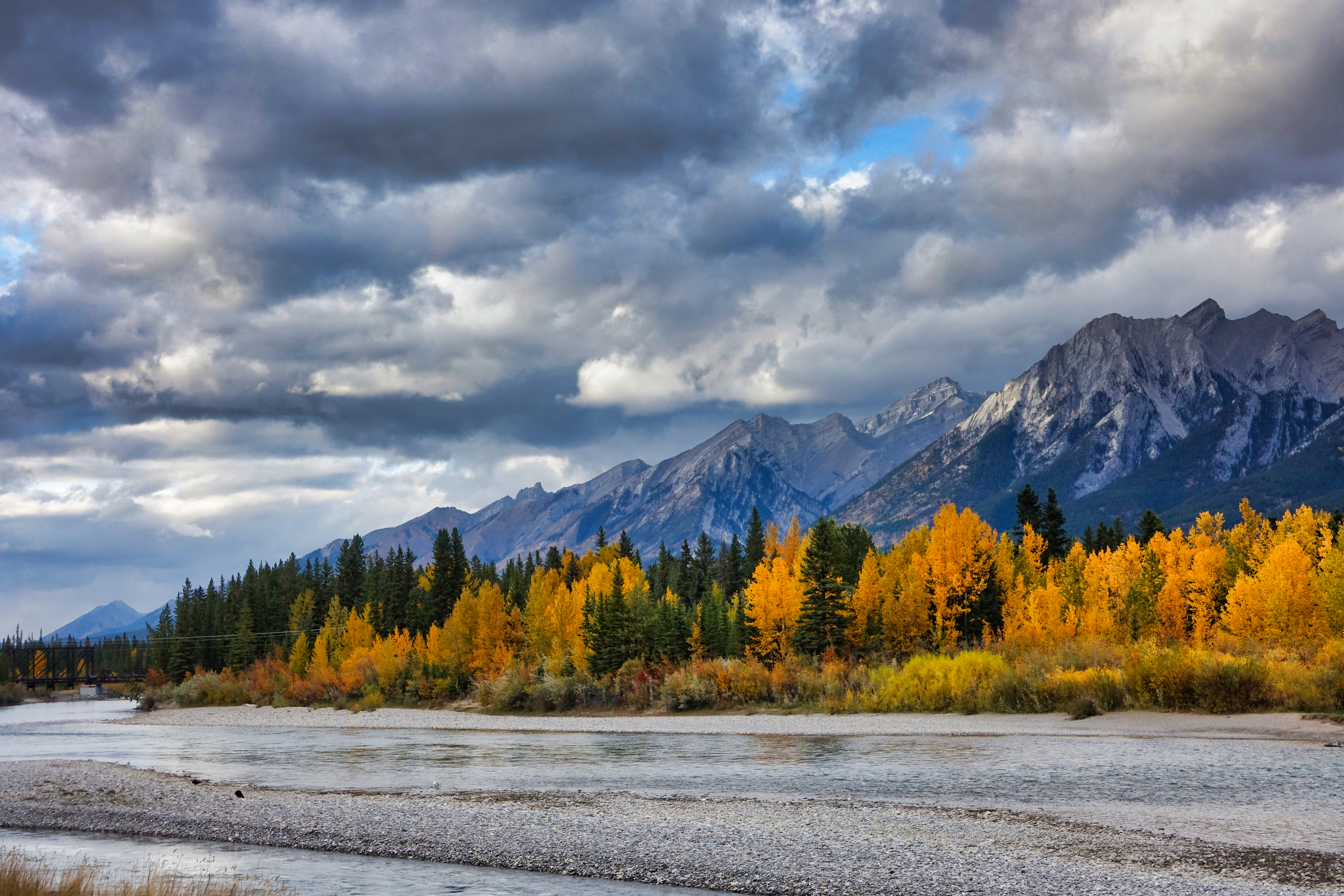
Princess Margaret Mountain to right, seen from Bow River

== See also ==
- Geology of Alberta
- Royal eponyms in Canada
