= Percy Girouard =

Northern Nigerian governor and railway builder from Canada

Sir Percy Girouard KCMG DSO
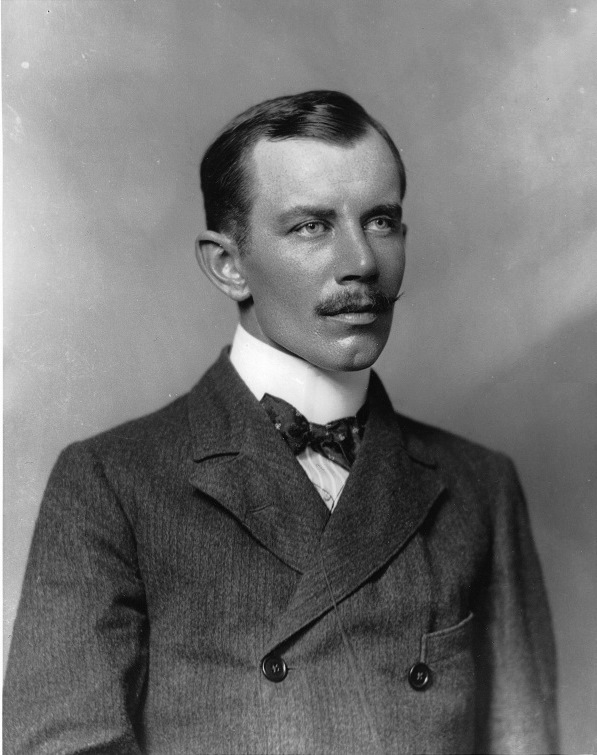
- Percy Girouard in 1899

High Commissioner of Northern Nigeria
- In office 1907–1909
- Preceded by: Sir Frederick John Dealtry Lugard
- Succeeded by: Sir Henry Hesketh Bell

Personal details
- Born: 26 January 1867 Montreal, Canada East
- Died: 26 September 1932 (aged 65) London, England
- Civilian awards: Knight Commander of the Order of St Michael and St George

Military service
- Rank: Colonel
- Military awards: Distinguished Service Order

Sir Édouard Percy Cranwill Girouard, KCMG, DSO (26 January 1867 – 26 September 1932) was an Empire enthusiast, a Canadian railway builder, High Commissioner of Northern Nigeria and the East Africa Protectorate and British industrialist.

== Education ==
Born in Montreal, Quebec, the son of Désiré Girouard and Essie Cranwill, he attended Collège de Montréal (1877–1878) and College St. Joseph in Trois-Rivières (1879–1882) and graduated from the Royal Military College of Canada in Kingston, Ontario, in 1886. Girouard's father was a wealthy French-Canadian lawyer who went on to become a Conservative MP and Supreme Court justice while his mother was an Irish immigrant. Unlike most of the other members of the French-Canadian elite of Montreal, Girourad was not educated at Laval University, the traditional training ground of the Francophone elite, instead electing for an education in English at the Royal Military College. Girouard graduated first in his class as an engineer, and was the first Roman Catholic ever to be awarded a degree in engineering at the Royal Military College.

== Career ==
Girouard worked for two years on the Canadian Pacific Railway's "International Railway of Maine" in Greenville, Maine, before he was commissioned in the Royal Engineers in 1888. Quickly earning a reputation as a very able and tough railroad man due to his work in Maine led to Girouard being offered a position in Britain in 1890. Girouard's family wanted him to stay in Canada, but Girouard wanted to see the world by building railroads all over the British Empire.

=== Railway-building in Sudan and Egypt ===
From 1890 to 1895 he was in charge of the Woolwich Arsenal Railway before he joined the Dongola Expedition in 1896 and was asked by Kitchener to supervise the extension of the old Wadi-Halfa to Akasha railroad, which marked the beginning of the Sudan Military Railroad. Kitchener had asked for Girouard as he was reputably the best railroad builder in the entire British Empire. On 20 March 1896, the town of Akasheh was taken by Sir Archibald Hunter, and Girouard went to work building a railroad across the desert. By 4 August 1896 Girouard reported to Kitchener the railroad now extended from Wali Halfa to Kosheh, covering some 116 miles of arid desert.

Building a railroad in the desert in the 19th century presented major challenges such as attacks from the Ansar, a workforce of about 800 Sudanese who knew nothing about building railroads and had to be taught everything, the occasional heavy rain that washed away the track, the need to import everything, and a cholera epidemic which killed off most of the workers in August 1896. Girouard had to establish two technical schools to train his Sudanese workers about how to work as station masters, yard shunters and signalers as none of those skills were known in the Sudan which had never known railroads. In his 1899 book The River War, Winston Churchill praised Girouard as an extraordinarily capable man who made the advance into the Sudan possible.

Sitting in his hut at Wadi Halfa, he drew up a comprehensive list. Nothing was forgotten. Every want was provided for; every difficulty was foreseen; every requisite was noted. The questions to be decided were numerous and involved. How much carrying capacity was required? How much rolling stock? How many engines? What spare parts? How much oil? How many lathes? How many cutters? How many punching and shearing machines? What arrangements of signals would be necessary? How many lamps? How many points? How many trolleys? What amount of coal should be ordered? How much water would be wanted? How should it be carried? To what extent would its carriage affect the hauling power and influence all previous calculations? How much railway plant was needed? How many miles of rail? How many thousand sleepers? Where could they be procured at such short notice? How many fishplates were necessary? What tools would be required? What appliances? What machinery? How much skilled labour was wanted? How much of the class of labour available? How were the workmen to be fed and watered? How much food would they want? How many trains a day must be run to feed them and their escort? How many must be run to carry plant? How did these requirements affect the estimate for rolling stock? The answers to all these questions, and to many others with which I will not inflict the reader, were set forth by Lieutenant Girouard in a ponderous volume several inches thick; and such was the comprehensive accuracy of the estimate that the working parties were never delayed by the want even of a piece of brass wire.

— Winston Churchill, The River War

After the British defeated the Ansar at the Battle of Hafir on 19 September 1896, Dongola was taken on 24 September 1896. These victories were largely made possible by the railroad Girouard built, which allowed Kitchener to bring in enough supplies and men to apply crushing firepower against the Ansar.

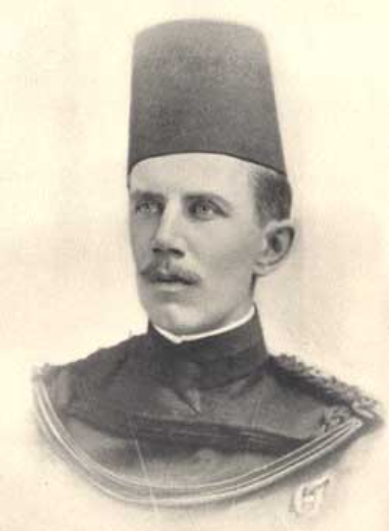
Girouard in the uniform of an Egyptian official

In 1897 he was ordered by Kitchener to build a railway from Wadi Halfa to Abu Hamed, 235 miles directly across the Nubian Desert, which eliminated 500 miles of navigation up the Nile River. This was highly risky as Girouard had always built his railroad close to the Nile, where there were gunboats to protect his workers from Ansar attacks, but he accepted the risk and went to work. Girouard frequently traveled up and down the railroad, supervising the work as he had little faith in the ability of his Sudanese workers to build a railroad on their own. When Kitchener purchased several locomotives that Girouard deemed too light to operate in the desert, the latter went to Britain to personally buy heavier locomotives from the United States and while borrowing several more from Cecil Rhodes in South Africa. The millionaire Rhodes, who made a fortune in the diamond and gold mines of South Africa had a great dream of building the Cape to Cairo Railway that would run from Cape Town across Africa to Cairo. In turn, the "Cape to Cairo railroad" would be the device for the British colonization of much of Africa as Rhodes had grandiose plans for settling millions of British settlers in Africa. As such, Rhodes was keen to do everything to help Kitchener conquer the Sudan so he could build his "Cape to Cairo railroad". The strong-willed Girouard was well known for his willingness to argue with Kitchener, a man whom many found to be very intimidating, and despite their frequent disagreements Kitchener never sacked him. This line that Girouard built allowed Kitchener to move the Egyptian and British armies under his command into the heart of the Sudan and defeat the forces of the Khalifa at Atbara and Omdurman in 1898. He received the Distinguished Service Order (DSO) following the defeat of the Sudanese. By then Girouard had been appointed President of Egyptian State Railways and was responsible for clearing the congestion at the Port of Alexandria. In 1902, he was awarded the Second Class of the Imperial Ottoman Order of the Medjidie "in recognition of his services as President of the Council of Administration of the Egyptian Railways, Telegraphs, and the Port of Alexandria".

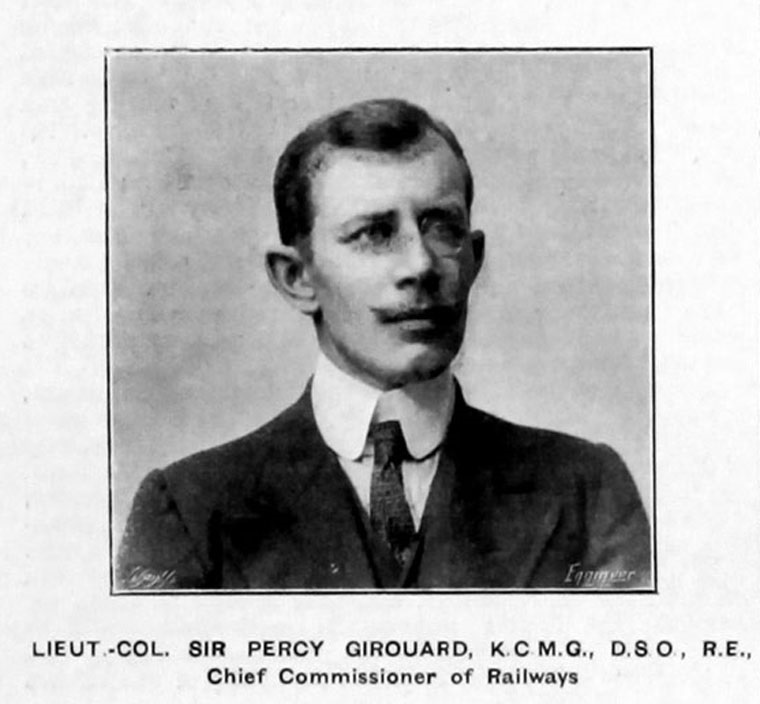
Girouard in 1903, at the time when he was Chief Commissioner of railways for the Transvaal and the Orange River Colony

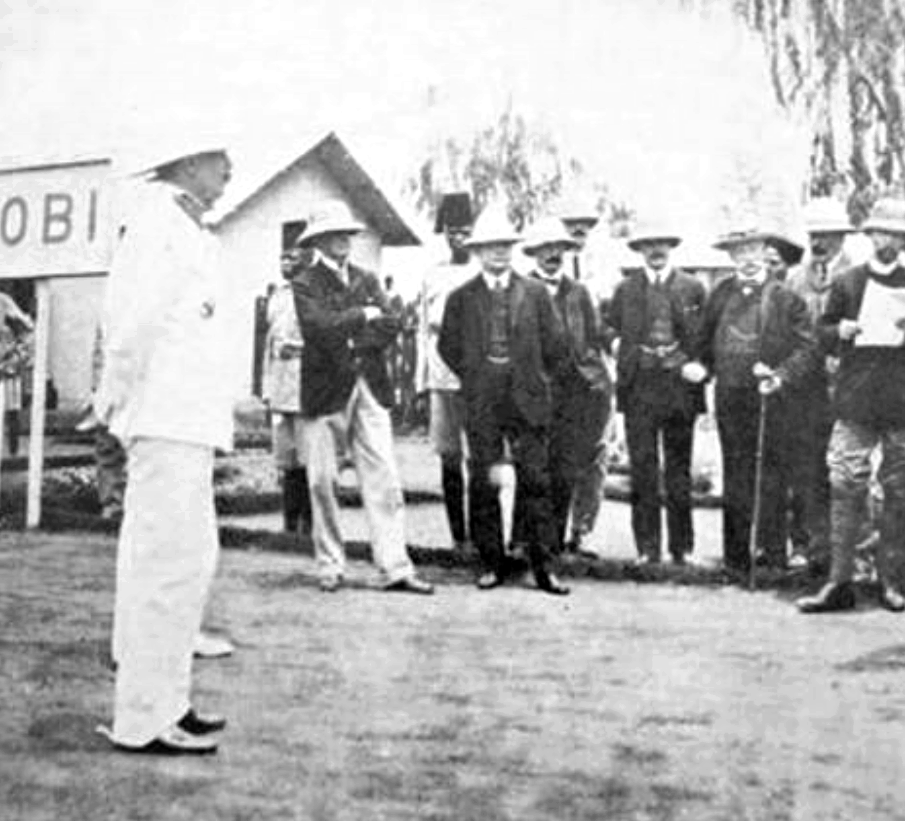
Percy Girouard (left), incoming governor of the East Africa Protectorate welcomed by British settlers in 1909

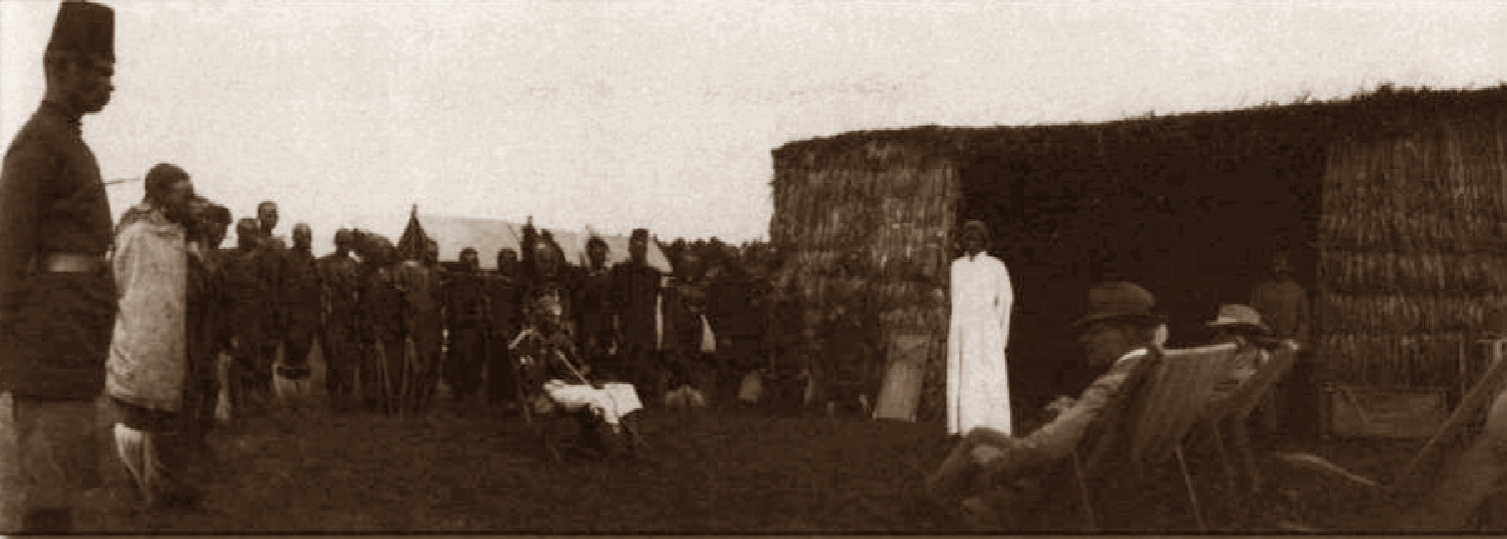
Girouard (seated right) in talks with a Kikuyu chief in Kenya c. 1910

=== South Africa, 1899–1904 ===
In October 1899 Girouard was sent by the War Office to South Africa to advise on the railway situation of the Cape Colony. When the Boer War (1899–1902) broke out he became Director of Imperial Military Railways which included the lines in the Cape, as well as the lines taken over from the Boers in the Orange Free State and the Transvaal. His rapid reconstruction of the damaged lines and the innovative low level deviations around destroyed bridges, enabled the rapid movement of men and material to support the rapid advance of Lord Robert's forces in 1900 to capture Pretoria. He was mentioned in dispatches (31 March 1900 and 23 June 1902), received the South Africa Medal, and in November 1900 he was knighted as a Knight Commander of the Order of St Michael and St George (KCMG) for his service in the war. Lord Kitchener wrote in a despatch how Girouard had been his "principal adviser in all the numerous and intricate questions pertaining to railway administration in South Africa", and concluded that "he is an officer of brilliant ability." After the end of the war, the Imperial Military Railways was renamed as the Central South African Railways in July 1902. Girouard remained in South Africa as Commissioner of the Railways (with the local rank of lieutenant-colonel) until pressure from the Johannesburg mine owners to reduce railway expenses forced his resignation in 1904.

=== High Commissioner, Nigeria and East Africa, 1906–1912 ===
In 1906, Winston Churchill, then Under-Secretary of State at the Colonial Office, promoted Girouard as the successor to Sir Frederick Lugard as High Commissioner in Northern Nigeria. Girouard was also responsible for building a railway from Baro, on the Niger River, 366 miles north to the ancient city of Kano. As High Commissioner he also supported the work of the Northern Nigerian Lands Committee and the legislation which resulted from this work had the effect of preventing the establishment of private property in land. He then served as Commissioner of the British East Africa Protectorate (Kenya) from 1909 to 1912. His involvement in the controversial move of the Maasai led to a smoldering dispute with the Colonial Secretary, Lord Milner, who accepted his resignation in 1912. By then Girouard had been offered a position as the managing director of the Eslwick Works of the armaments and shipbuilding concern of Armstrong Whitworth and Co. Ltd.

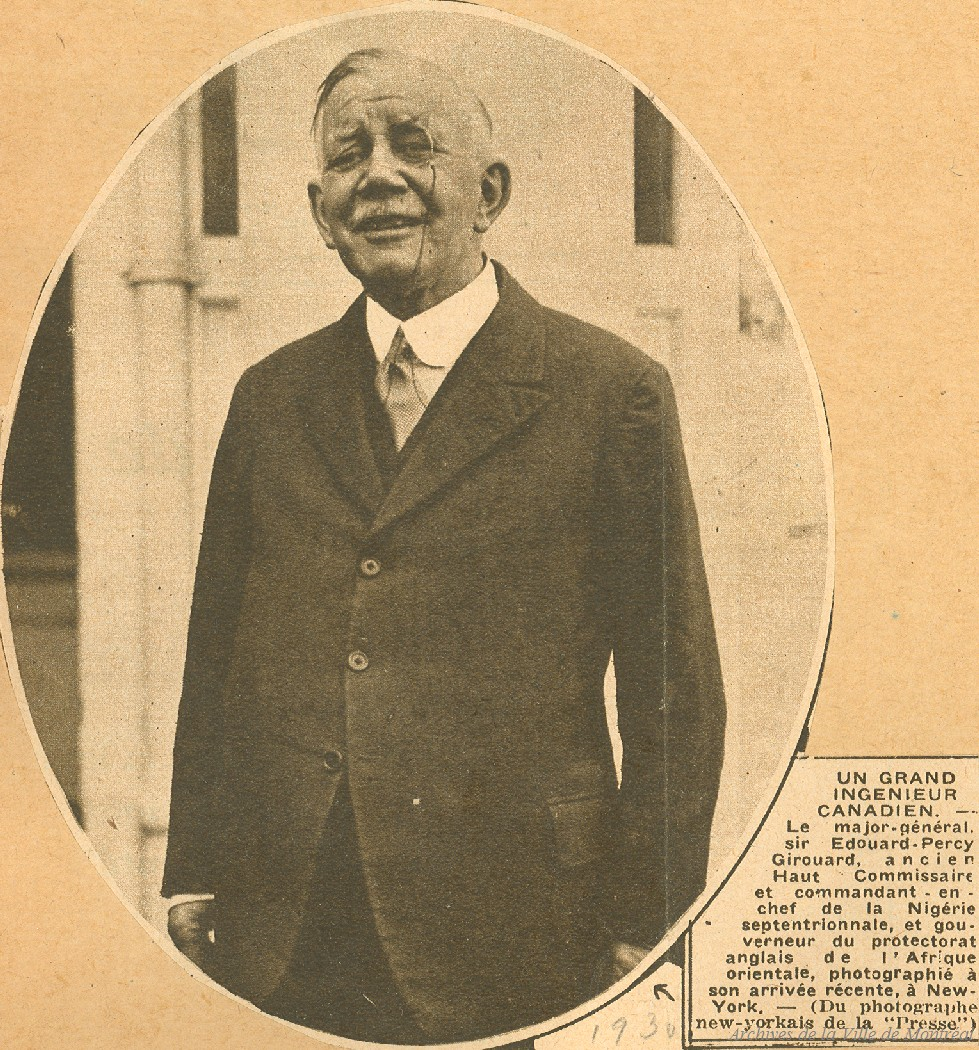
Girouard in 1930

=== Later career and life, 1912–1932 ===
From 1912 until 1923 Girouard remained at Armstrong's except for a brief period in 1915 when the "Shell Crisis" forced the British Government to abandon its "business as usual" policy. Kitchener had asked Girouard for advice on the production of munitions and supported his appointment as Director General of Munitions in the newly formed Ministry of Munitions under Lloyd George. But Girouard could not work under a politician and six weeks later he returned to Armstrong's Elswick works in Newcastle where he remained a company director until his death.

Girouard died in London, England, in 1932. He is buried in Brookwood Cemetery in Surrey.

== Family ==
In 1903 he married Mary Gwendolen Solomon, the only child of Sir Richard Solomon, at Pretoria, Transvaal. Their only child was Richard Desire Girouard (1905–1989), who is the father of Mark Girouard, the writer and architectural historian.

== Legacy ==
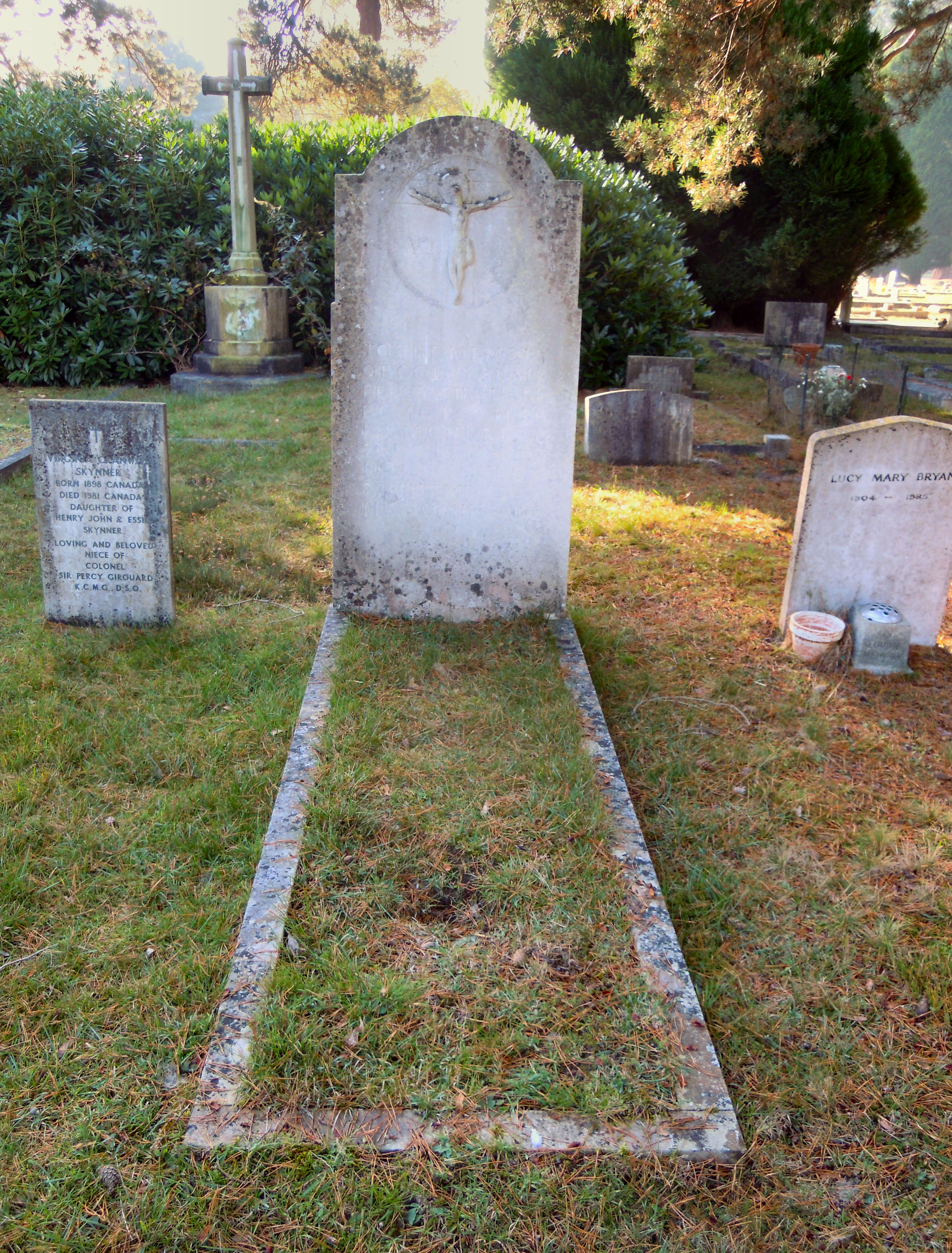
Girouard's grave at Brookwood Cemetery

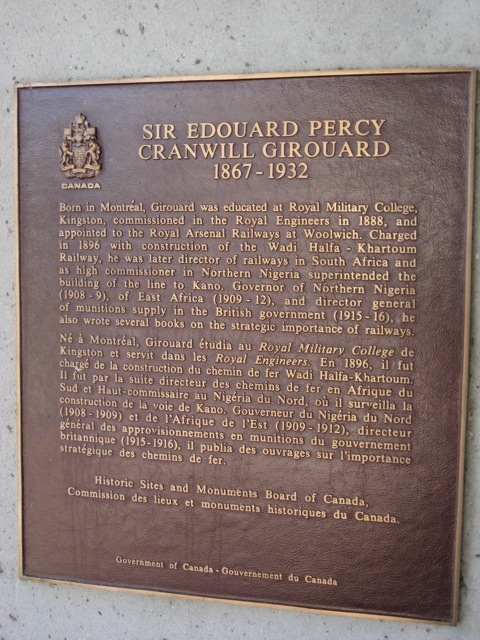
Percy Girouard plaque at Royal Military College of Canada

Mount Girouard, which is located in the Bow River Valley south of Lake Minnewanka, Fairholme Range, in Banff National Park, Alberta. was named in his honour in 1904. Latitude 51; 14; 15, longitude 115; 24; 05.

The Girouard Academic Building at the Royal Military College of Canada in Kingston, Ontario, was named in his honour in 1977. A plaque honouring Sir Edouard Percy Cranwill Girouard 1867–1932 was erected in 1985 by the Historic Sites and Monuments Board of Canada in a breezeway between the Girouard and Sawyer Buildings at the Royal Military College of Canada "Born in Montréal, Girouard was educated at Royal Military College, Kingston, commissioned in the Royal Engineers in 1888, and appointed to the Royal Arsenal Railways at Woolwich. Charged in 1896 with construction of the Wadi Halfa – Khartoum Railway, he was later director of railways in South Africa and as high commissioner in Northern Nigeria superintended the building of a line to Kano. Governor of Northern Nigeria (1908–9), of East Africa (1909–12), and director general of munitions supply in the British government (1915–16), he also wrote several books on the strategic importance of railways."

The Irish historian Donal Lowry used Girouard's career as an example of "French-Canadian loyalism" to the British Empire in the Victorian and Edwardian eras, using him together with men such as Sir Wilfrid Laurier, who served as Prime Minister between 1896 and 1911; Louis-Honoré Fréchette, considered to be the most talented French-Canadian poet of his generation; Sir Adolphe-Basile Routhier who wrote the national anthem O Canada in 1880; and Major Talbot Mercer Papineau, the politician and soldier who might had become Prime Minister had he not been killed at the battle of Passchendaele in 1917; who all identified with the British Empire.

== Sources ==
- Sir Édouard Percy Cranwill Girouard at The Canadian Encyclopedia

Edouard Percy Girouard (obituary): 30 September 1930, Engineering, at Grace's Guide to British Industrial History.
