= Cuthead Creek =

Stream in the country of Canada

Coordinates: 51.39972°N 115.68056°W

Cuthead Creek is a stream in Alberta, Canada. It is a tributary of the Cascade River.

The river's name comes from the Stoney Indians of the area, whose legend tells of a warrior who was beheaded near this creek.

== See also ==
- List of rivers of Alberta
