= Mount Peechee =

Mountain in Canada

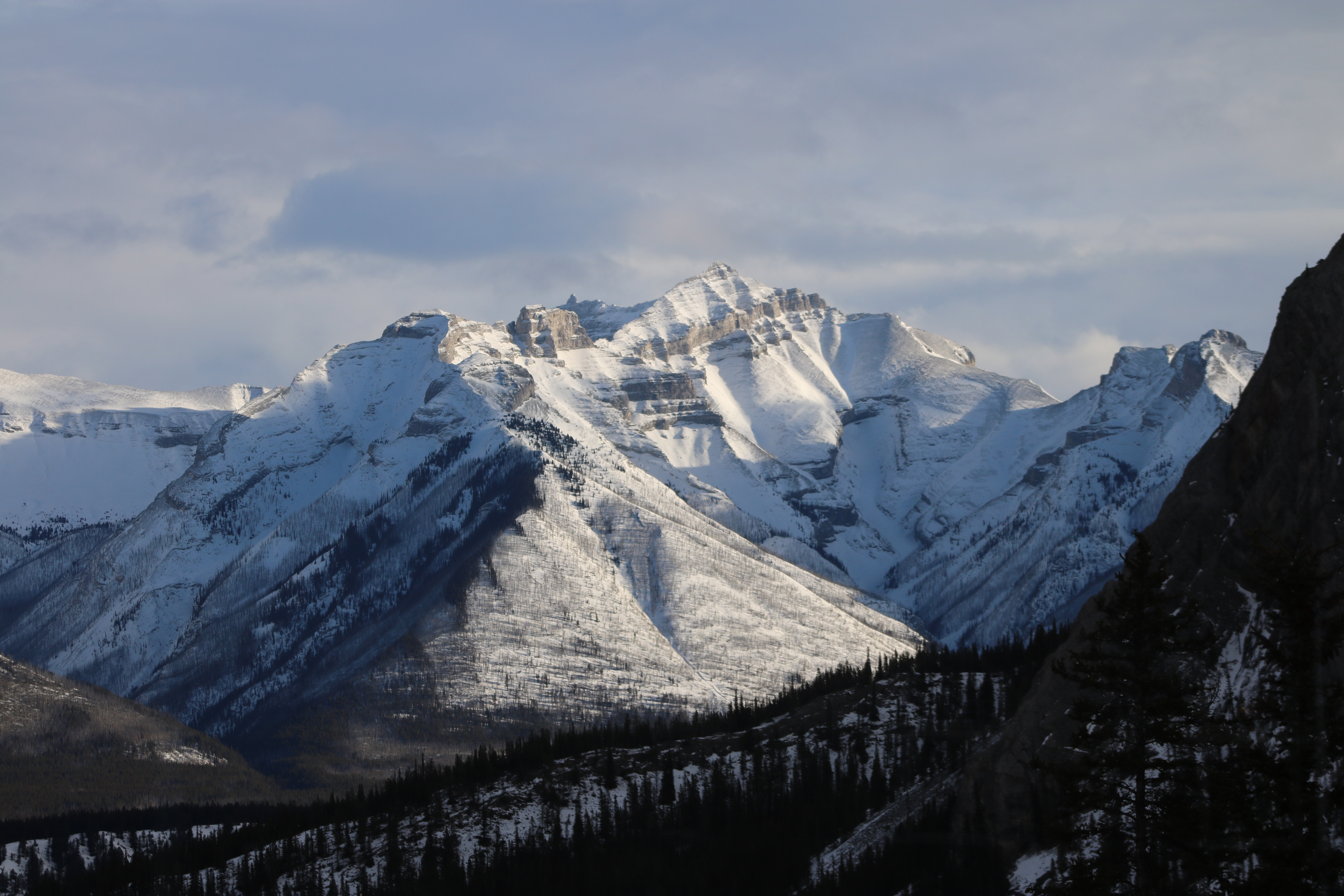

Highest point
- Elevation: 2,935 m (9,629 ft)
- Prominence: 160 m (520 ft)
- Listing: Mountains of Alberta
- Coordinates: 51°12′35″N 115°22′38″W

Geography
- Location within Alberta Location within Canada
- Country: Canada
- Province: Alberta
- Protected area: Banff National Park
- Parent range: Fairholme Range
- Topo map: NTS 82O3 Canmore

Climbing
- First ascent: 1929
- Easiest route: rock climb

Mount Peechee is the third highest peak of the Fairholme Range in Banff National Park. Mt. Peechee is located immediately southeast of Mount Girouard in the Bow River valley south of Lake Minnewanka.

The mountain was named in 1884 by George Dawson after Indigenous guide Alexis Piché, who escorted George Simpson through the front ranges of the Canadian Rockies.

== Geology ==
Like other mountains in Banff National Park, Mount Peechee is composed of sedimentary rock laid down during the Precambrian to Jurassic periods. Formed in shallow seas, this sedimentary rock was pushed east and over the top of younger rock during the Laramide orogeny.

== Climate ==
Based on the Köppen climate classification, Mount Peechee is located in a subarctic climate zone with cold, snowy winters, and mild summers. Temperatures can drop below −20 °C with wind chill factors below −30 °C. Precipitation runoff from Mount Peechee drains into tributaries of the Bow River, which is a tributary of the Saskatchewan River.

== Gallery ==
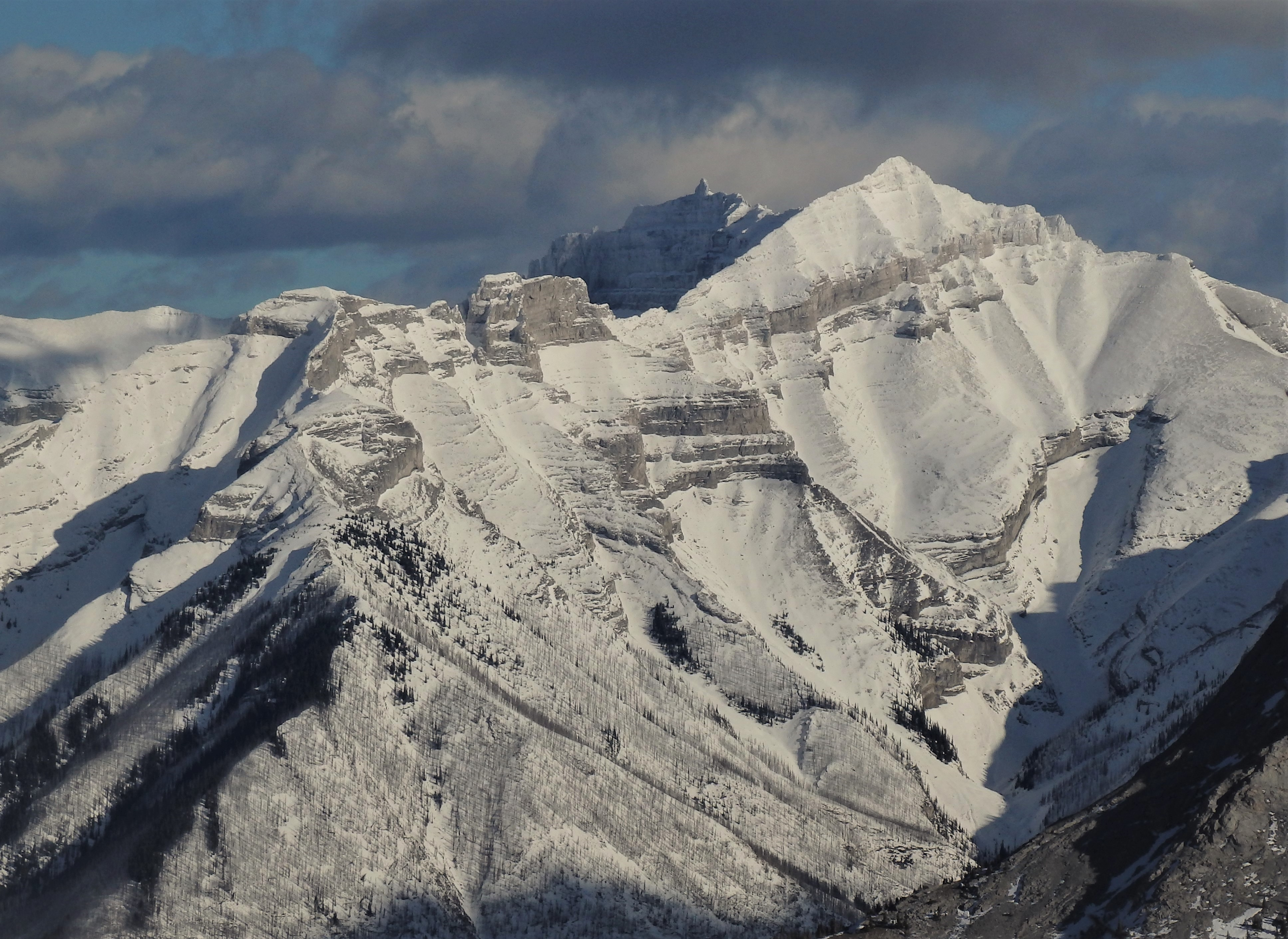
Mount Peechee from southwest on Sulphur Mountain

== See also ==
- Geology of Alberta
