= Mount Lady Macdonald =

Mountain in Alberta, Canada

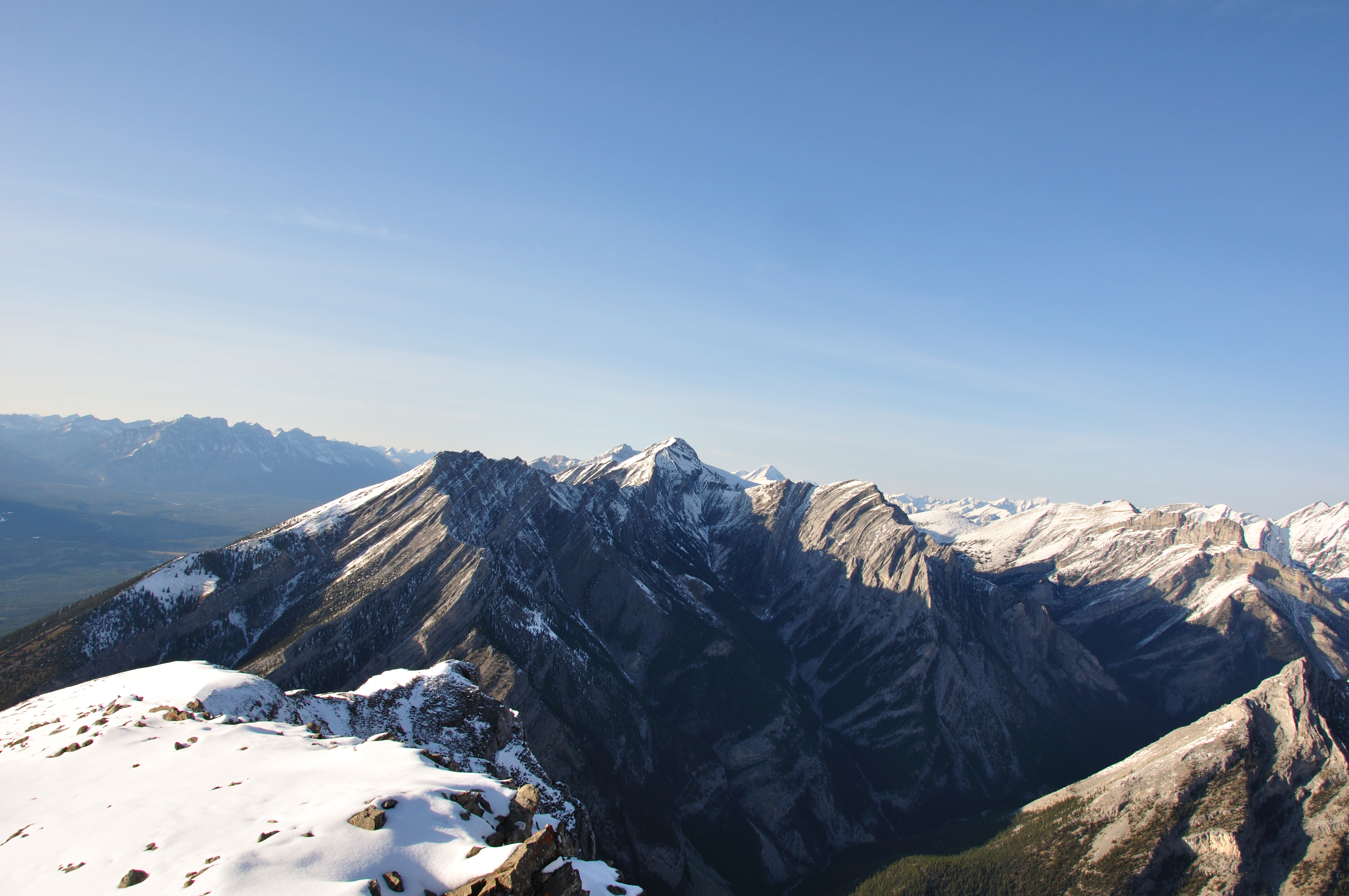
- Mount Lady Macdonald from Grotto Mountain (minor summit), October 2009

Highest point
- Elevation: 2,606 m (8,550 ft)
- Prominence: 75 m (246 ft)
- Parent peak: Mount Charles Stewart (2809 m)
- Listing: Mountains of Alberta
- Coordinates: 51°07′17″N 115°19′04″W

Geography
- Location within Alberta
- Interactive map of Mount Lady Macdonald
- Country: Canada
- Province: Alberta
- Protected area: Bow Valley Provincial Park
- Parent range: Fairholme Range
- Topo map: NTS 82O3 Canmore

Climbing
- First ascent: 1886 by J.J. McArthur
- Easiest route: Scramble (difficult)

Mount Lady Macdonald is a mountain located within Bow Valley Provincial Park in the Bow River valley at the town of Canmore, which is located just east of Banff National Park, Alberta, Canada.

The mountain was named in 1886 after Susan Agnes Macdonald, wife of Sir John A. Macdonald, the first Prime Minister of Canada. The Macdonalds travelled on the new national railway through the Canadian Rockies in 1886 on their way to Vancouver.

Hikers may hike a trail that begins in Cougar Creek and continues to a helipad just short of the knife's edge ridge that leads to the top of the mountain. On the top under a cairn there is a canister in which a pencil and a list of those who have climbed there are stored.

== Geology ==
It is composed of sedimentary rock laid down from the Precambrian to Jurassic periods. Formed in shallow seas, this sedimentary rock was pushed east and over the top of younger rock during the Laramide orogeny.

== Climate ==
Based on the Köppen climate classification, it is located in a subarctic climate with cold, snowy winters, and mild summers. Temperatures can drop below -20 C with wind chill factors below -30 C. Weather conditions during summer months are optimum for climbing.

== Gallery ==
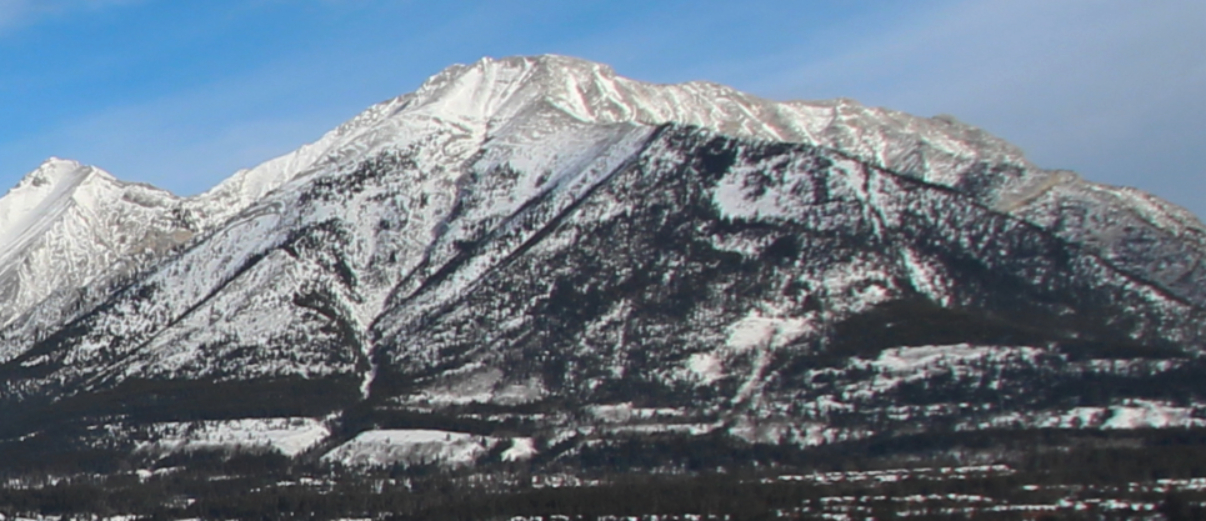
Mount Lady McDonald

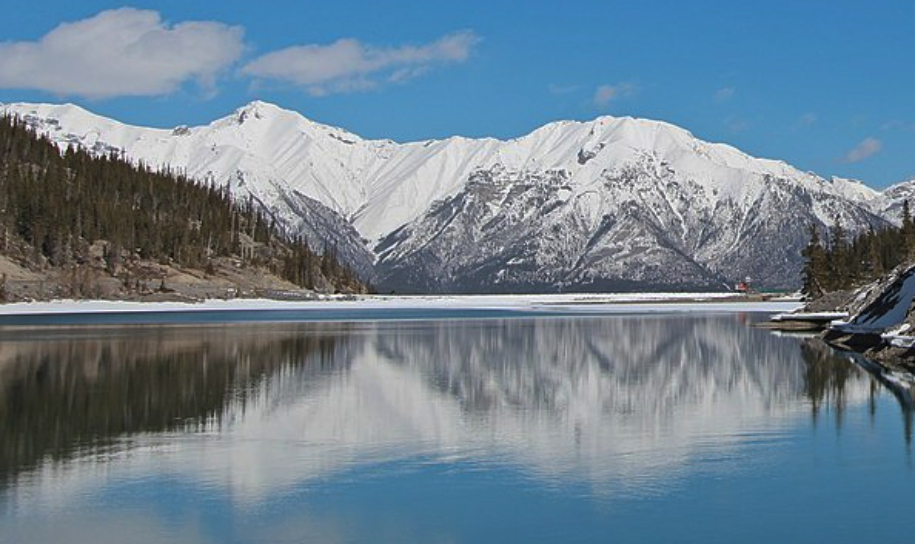
Mount Lady McDonald (right) seen with Mount Charles Stewart (left)

== See also ==
- Geology of Alberta
