= Anûkathâ Îpa =

Mountain in Alberta, Canada

- Bald Eagle Peak
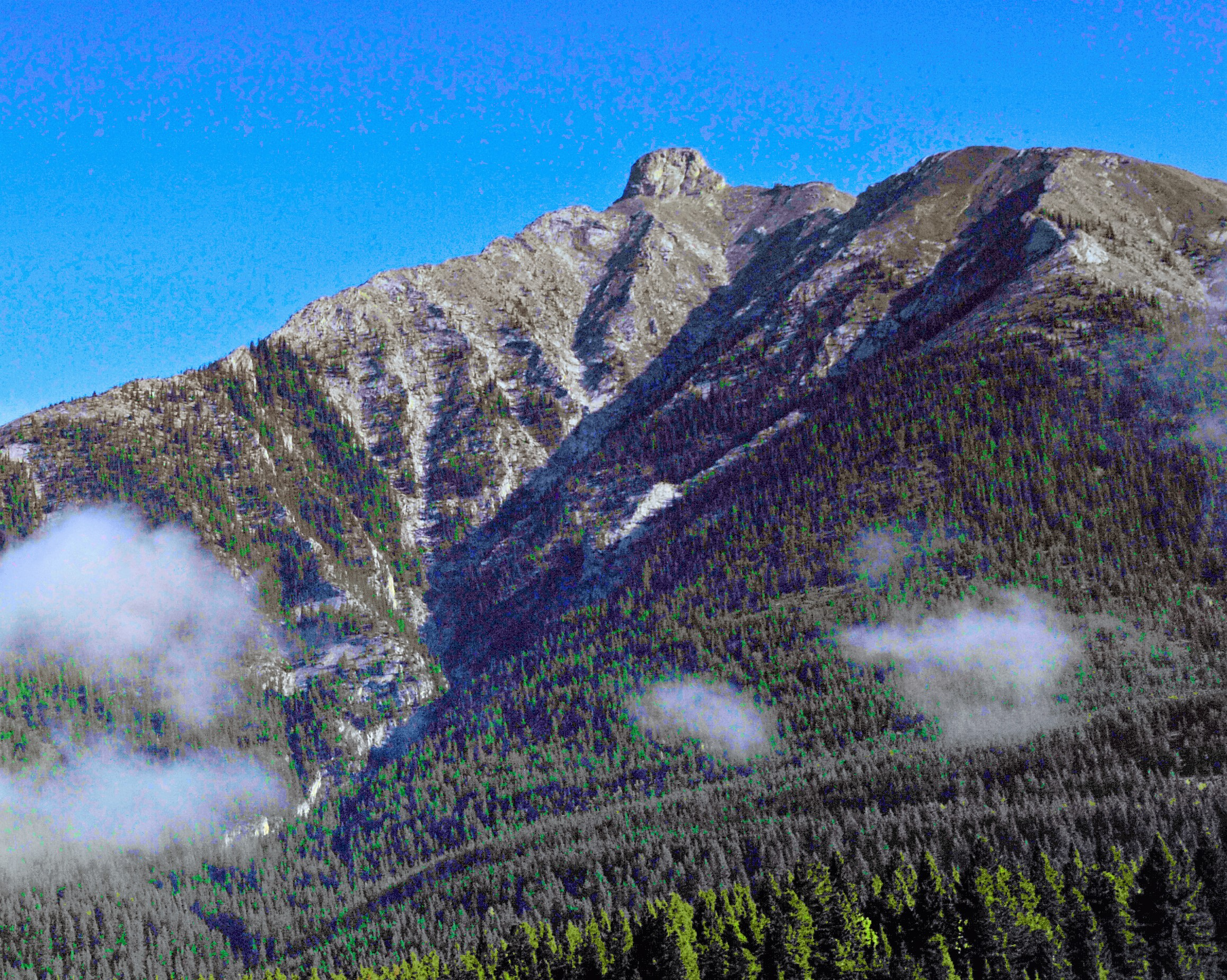
- Anûkathâ Îpa from Canmore

Highest point
- Elevation: 2,514 m (8,248 ft)
- Prominence: 34 m (112 ft)
- Listing: Mountains of Alberta
- Coordinates: 51°08′10″N 115°20′16″W

Naming
- English translation: Bald Eagle Peak
- Language of name: North American Indian languages

Geography
- Location within Alberta
- Interactive map of Anûkathâ Îpa
- Country: Canada
- Province: Alberta
- Parent range: Fairholme Range
- Topo map: NTS 82O3 Canmore

Climbing
- Easiest route: Scramble

Anûkathâ Îpa (Stoney: Anûkathâ Îpa, pronounced [ˌanũˈkʰaθã ĩˈpʰa], (Note: 'Corner' is the only definition listed for îpa in the Stoney Nakoda Dictionary Online at this time, but this word generally refers to objects that come to a point, such as a mountain peak. See also the closely related word îpta meaning 'tip, point'.) lit. transl. 'Bald Eagle Peak', sometimes written in English language sources as Anû Kathâ Îpa (Note: As seen and heard in the online dictionary, anûkathâ 'bald eagle' is typically understood to be a single word in Stoney Nakoda. Breaking up words into multiple parts is sometimes used to help learners and non-speakers achieve the correct pronunciation.)) is an outlier of Mount Charles Stewart in the Canadian Rockies of Alberta. It is one of the most prominent landmarks in the vicinity of Canmore, Alberta.

Anûkathâ Îpa is the official name for the high point of a ridge that lies southwest of the Mount Charles Stewart summit and northwest of Mount Lady Macdonald near Canmore. The peak was formerly known as "Squaw's Tit" because of its resemblance to a woman's breast. It is part of a larger formation that has the appearance of a woman lying on her back, including a face, hair, and the general shape of a body, which adds to the resemblance.

On August 20, 2020 it was reported that the prominence would be renamed to avoid racist and misogynistic naming. The Stoney Nakoda people were asked to help select a culturally appropriate name and a request to support the initiative was brought to the Municipal District of Bighorn in September 2020. It was officially renamed on September 29, 2020.

Belonging to the Fairholme Range in Kananaskis Provincial Park, Anûkathâ Îpa is 1,200 metres (3,900 ft) above the Bow River valley. It is 2 km (1.2 mi) northwest of Lady Macdonald, just east of the Banff National Park gates.

== Routes ==
For climbers, a scrambling route is graded moderate but includes exposure, so the ascent is not recommended in wet conditions. Climbers are advised to follow the major drainage ditch behind Harvie Heights and stay close along the right (south) side of the ditch, and then to follow this up to the North West ridge all the way to the slabs just below the summit.

== Gallery ==
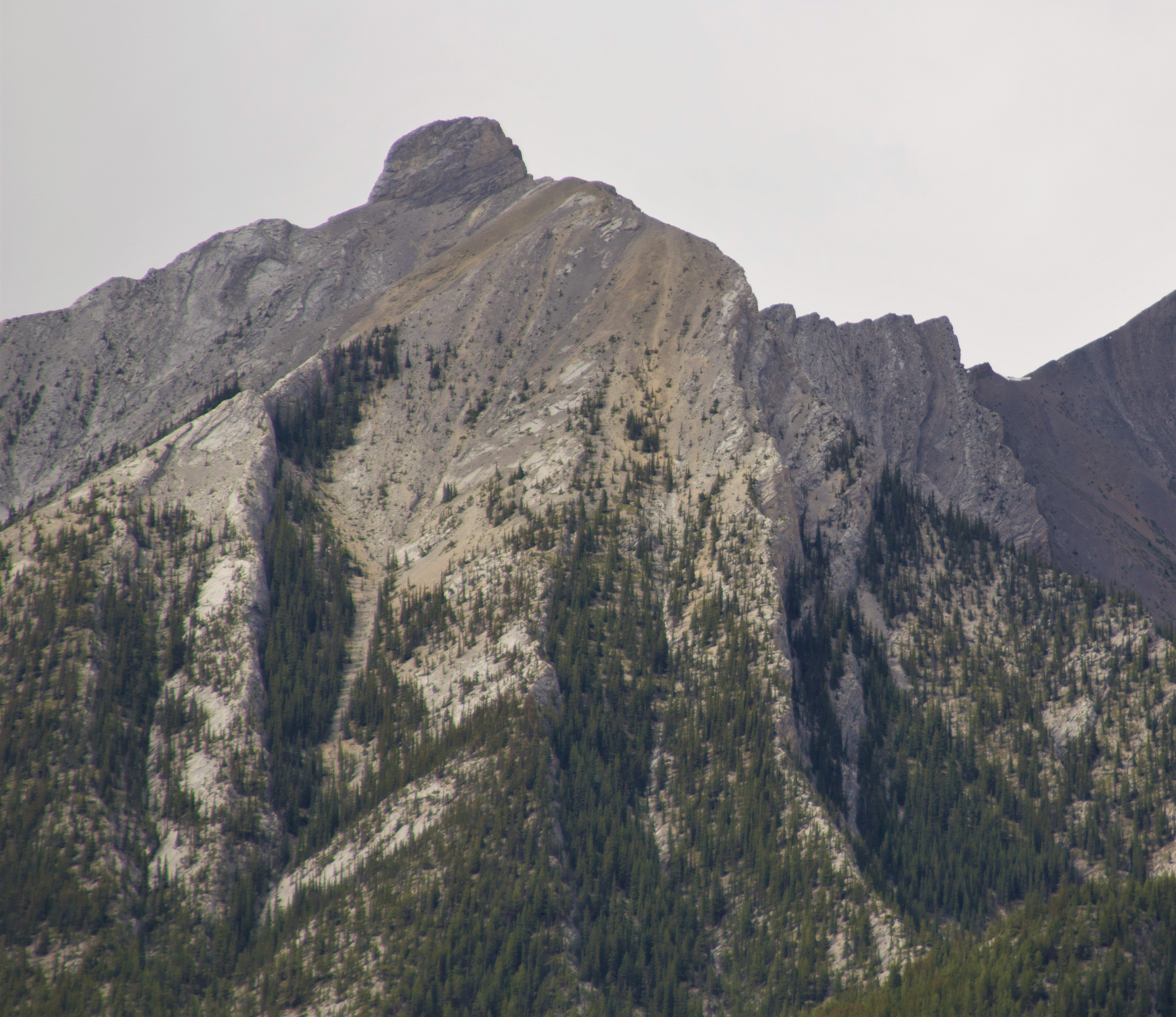
Southwest aspect

== See also ==
- List of mountains in the Canadian Rockies
- Breast-shaped hill
- Mark Monmonier
