= Mount Inglismaldie =

Mountain in Banff NP, Alberta, Canada

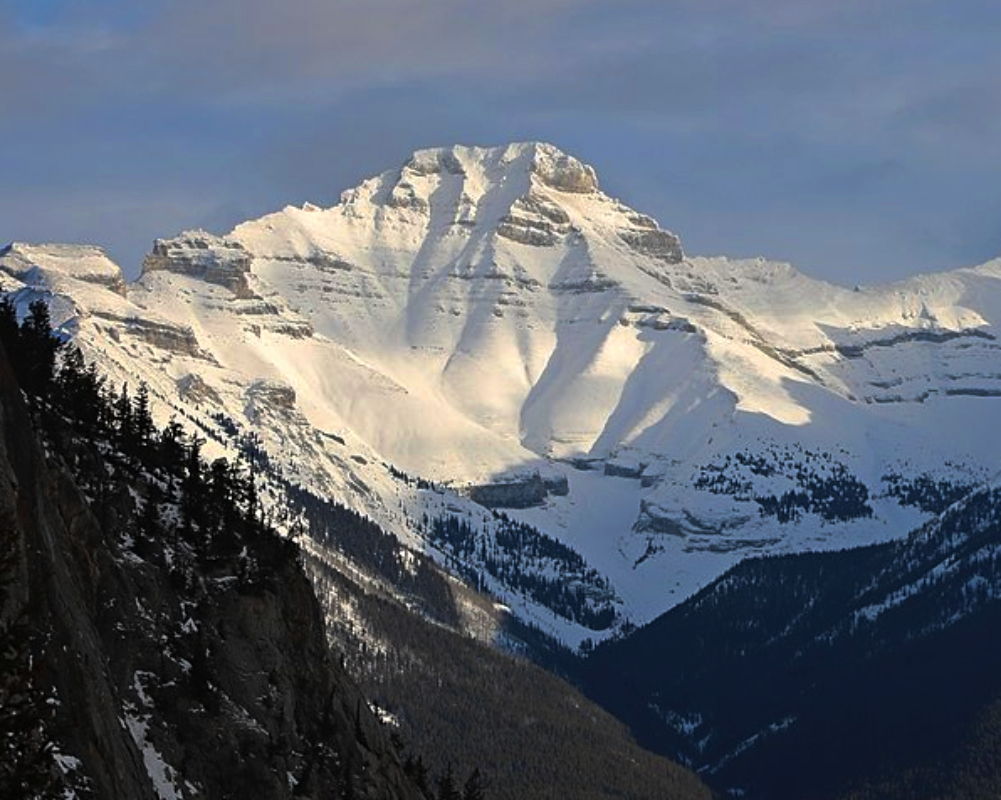
- Mount Inglismaldie in winter

Highest point
- Elevation: 2,964 m (9,724 ft)
- Prominence: 160 m (520 ft)
- Coordinates: 51°14′30″N 115°25′15″W

Geography
- Location within Alberta Location within Canada
- Location: Alberta, Canada
- Parent range: Fairholme Range; Canadian Rockies
- Topo map: NTS 82O3 Canmore

Geology
- Rock age: Cambrian
- Rock type: sedimentary rock

Climbing
- First ascent: 1933
- Easiest route: Scramble

Mount Inglismaldie is the second-highest peak of the Fairholme Range in Banff National Park. It is located immediately west of Mount Girouard in the Bow River valley south of Lake Minnewanka.

The mountain was named in 1886 by park superintendent George A. Stewart after Inglismaldie Castle in Kincardineshire, Scotland.

The first ascent of the mountain was made in 1933 by H. Foster, J. Packer, M.C. Wylie, Betts, Dickson, W. Innes, L. DeCouteur, J. Miskow, Sadler, and Vallance with guide Lawrence Grassi.

== Geology ==
Like other mountains in Banff National Park, Mount Inglismaldie is composed of sedimentary rock laid down during the Precambrian to Jurassic periods. Formed in shallow seas, this sedimentary rock was pushed east and over the top of younger rock during the Laramide orogeny.

== Climate ==
Based on the Köppen climate classification, Mount Inglismaldie is located in a subarctic climate with cold, snowy winters, and mild summers. Winter temperatures can drop below −20 °C with wind chill factors below −30 °C. Precipitation runoff from Mount Inglismaldie drains into Lake Minnewanka and the Bow River.

== Gallery ==
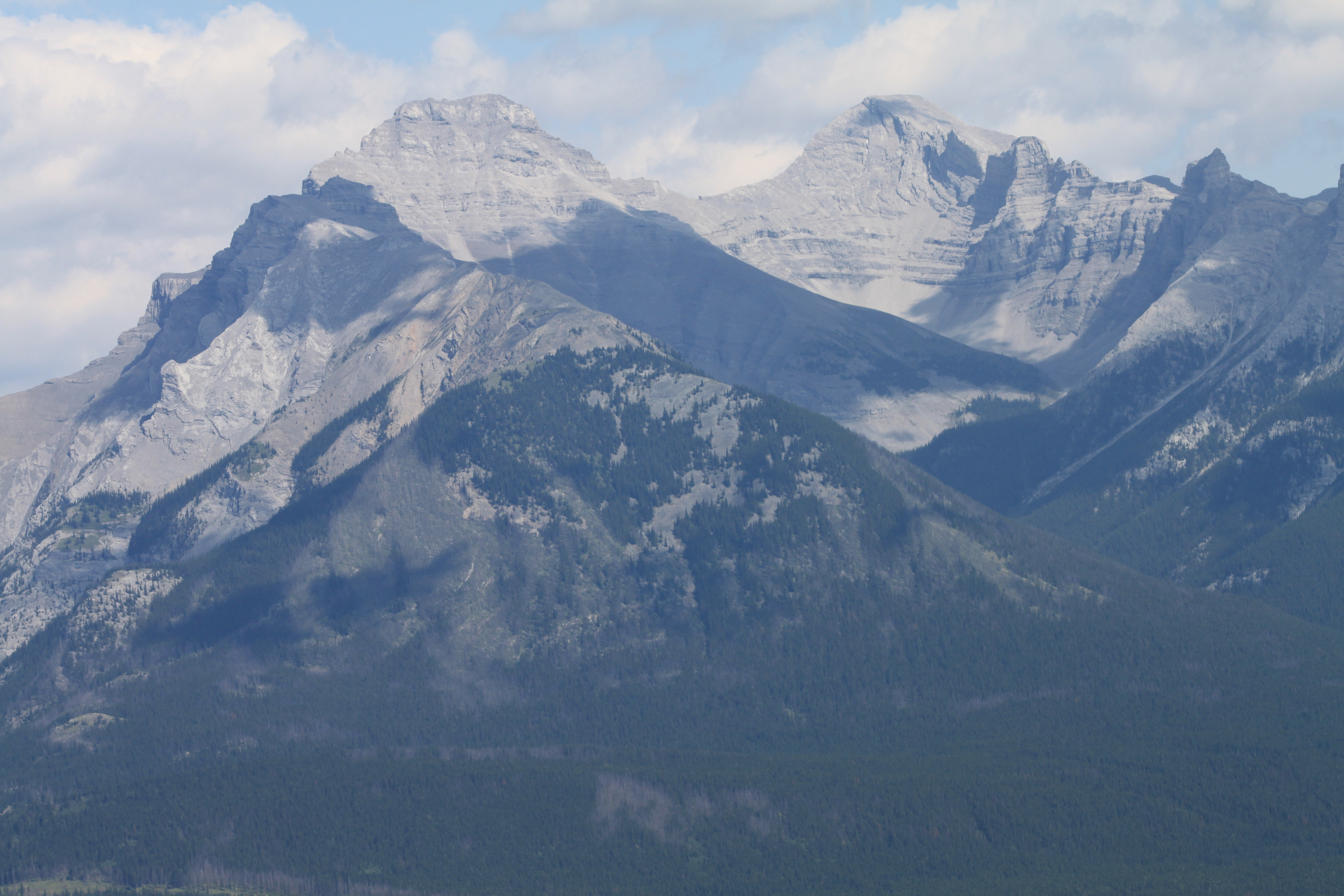
Mount Inglismaldie (left) and Mount Girouard (right)

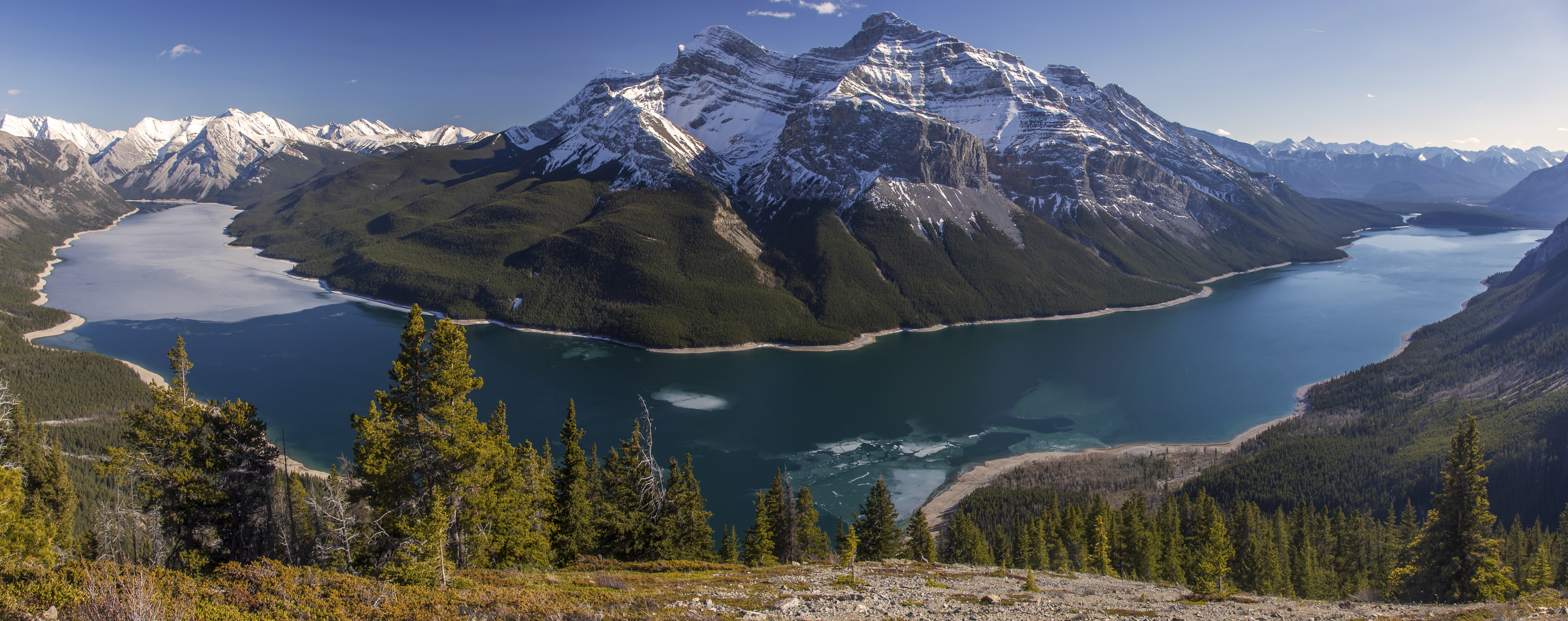
Lake Minnewanka with Mount Inglismaldie (right) and Mount Girouard (left)
