= Fairholme Range =

Mountain range in Alberta, Canada

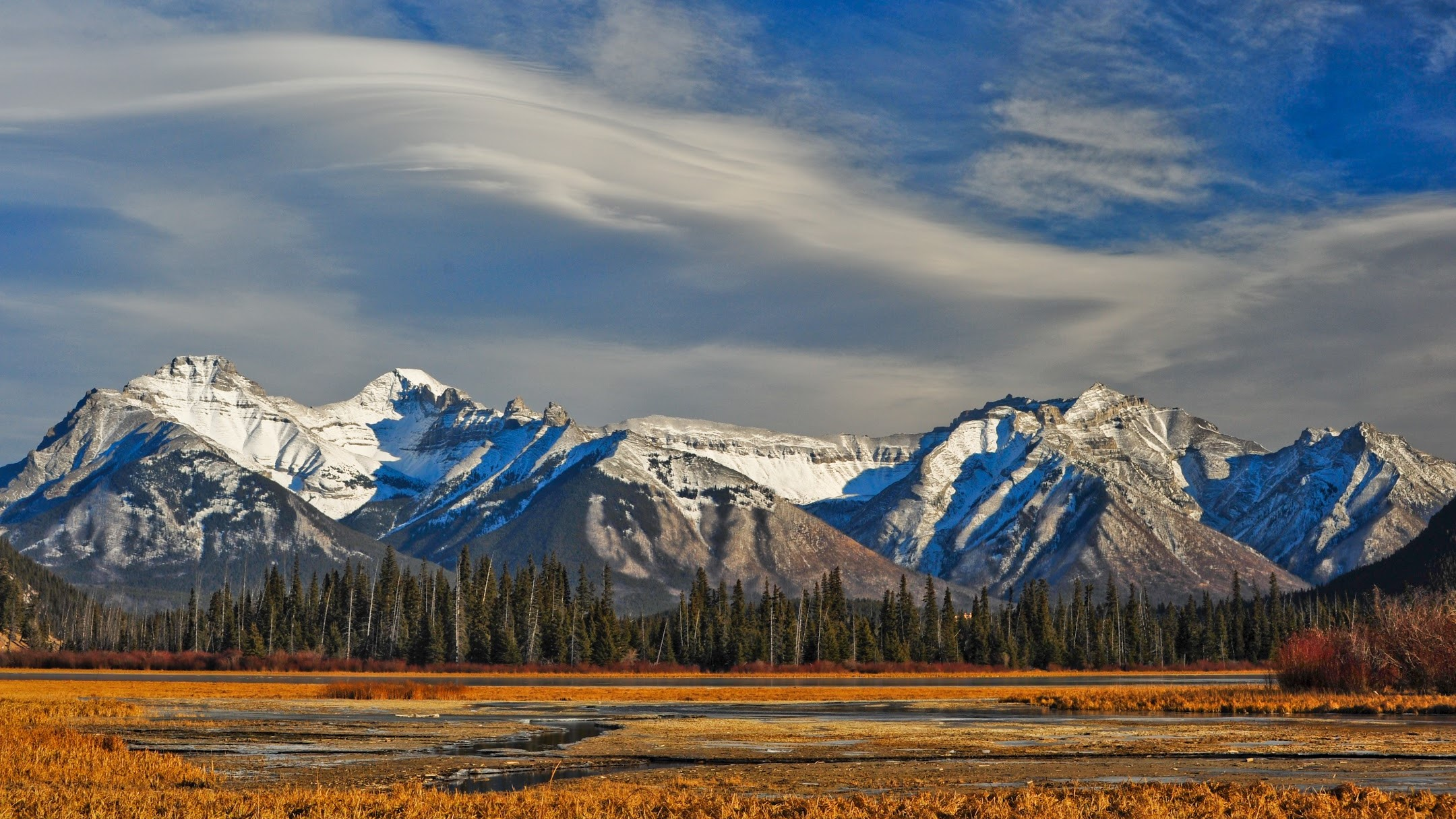
- The Fairholme Range's top three: Mts Inglismaldie, Girouard and Peechee, from the Vermillion Lakes

Highest point
- Peak: Mount Girouard
- Elevation: 2,995 m (9,826 ft)
- Coordinates: 51°14′10″N 115°24′11″W

Geography
- Location within Alberta
- Country: Canada
- Province: Alberta
- Range coordinates: 51°08′59″N 115°19′36″W
- Parent range: Front Ranges
- Topo map: NTS 82O3 Canmore

The Fairholme Range is a mountain range east of the Bow River valley in the Canadian Rockies. The range is bounded on the west side by the Trans-Canada Highway as it passes through the towns of Exshaw and Canmore, while the northern section of the range extends into Banff National Park to the southern shores of Lake Minnewanka. John Palliser named the range in 1859 after his sister Grace Fairholme, who had married William Fairholme.

In the spring and summer of 2003, Parks Canada performed a prescribed burn in selected areas of the range in order to reduce fire hazard, manage the pine beetle population and increase sheep habitat. In total, 5300 hectares of land were affected.

== List of mountains ==
Peaks of this range include:

Name	Elevation		Prominence		Coordinates
Name	m	ft	m	ft	Coordinates
Mount Girouard	2,995	9,826	1,455	4,774	51°14′10″N 115°24′11″W
Mount Inglismaldie	2,964	9,724	160	520	51°14′30″N 115°25′16″W
Mount Peechee	2,935	9,629	160	520	51°12′35″N 115°22′38″W
Mount Charles Stewart	2,809	9,216	363	1,191	51°9′18″N 115°19′59″W
Grotto Mountain	2,706	8,878	238	781	51°5′16″N 115°16′5″W
Mount Fable	2,702	8,865	203	666	51°7′6″N 115°13′40″W
Mount Lady Macdonald	2,606	8,550	75	246	51°7′20″N 115°19′0″W
Princess Margaret Mountain	2,515	8,251	38	125	51°9′32″N 115°22′8″W
Anûkathâ Îpa	2,514	8,248	34	112	51°8′10″N 115°20′16″W
Association Peak	2,362	7,749	102	335	51°10′50″N 115°7′34″W

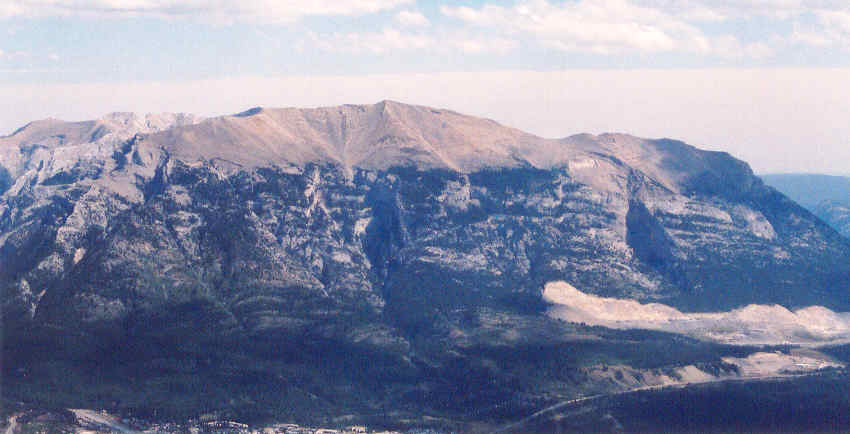
Grotto Mountain in 2005

Anûkathâ Îpa is the official name as of 2020 of a mountain that previously held a racist and offensive name.
