= Grotto Mountain =

Mountain in Alberta, Canada

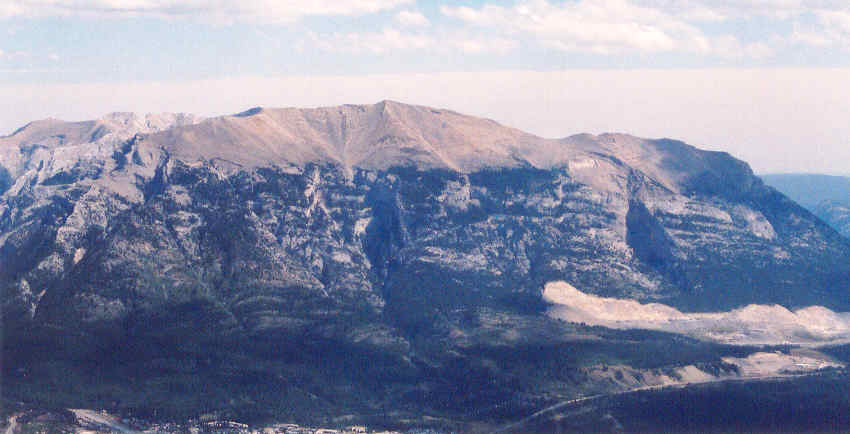
- Grotto Mountain from Ha Ling Peak, 2005

Highest point
- Elevation: 2,706 m (8,878 ft)
- Prominence: 238 m (781 ft)
- Parent peak: Mount Townsend 2820 m
- Listing: Mountains of Alberta
- Coordinates: 51°05′16″N 115°16′05″W

Geography
- Location within Alberta
- Location: Alberta, Canada
- Parent range: Fairholme Range
- Topo map: NTS 82O3 Canmore

Climbing
- First ascent: 1859 by [James Hector]
- Easiest route: Easy/Moderate Scramble

Grotto Mountain is a mountain located in the Bow River valley, across from Canmore, Alberta, Canada. It is a popular hiking spot among locals and is home to the Rat's Nest Cave.

The mountain was named for a grotto-like cave within it.

There are two main scrambling routes:

- Northwest Variation - from the ACC clubhouse, ascends the northwest side of the mountain on a good hiking trail. At tree line, the trail narrows to the false summit. From there, it is a gradual ascent to the summit with brief stints of scrambling but mostly hiking.
- Direct route. Ascends directly under the summit. Shorter but more arduous.
