= Cascade River (Alberta) =

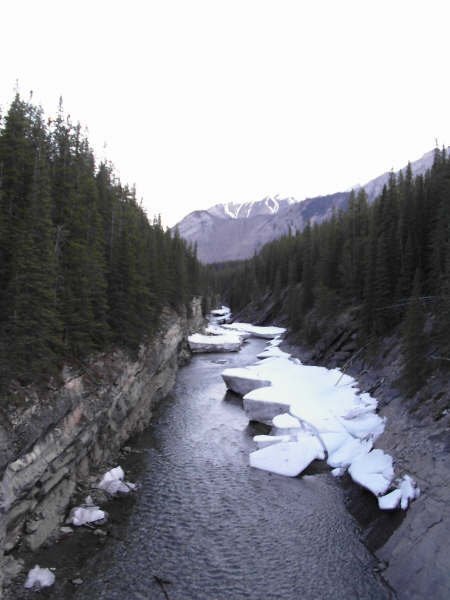
- The Cascade River in Stewart Canyon

Location
- Country: Canada
- Province: Alberta

Physical characteristics
- Source
  - location: Bonnet Glacier/Badger Pass
  - coordinates: 51°25′29″N 115°50′28″W
  - elevation: 2,174 m (7,133 ft)
- Mouth
  - location: Bow River
  - coordinates: 51°09′59″N 115°28′43″W
  - elevation: 1,361 m (4,465 ft)

Basin features
- Waterbodies: Lake Minnewanka

The Cascade River is a medium-sized river in southwestern Alberta, Canada. It originates in the Canadian Rockies, flows through Lake Minnewanka, and in turn, joins the Bow River.

The Cascade River is formed from the glacial melt of Flints and Bonnet Peaks, as well as Block Mountain. Glacial lakes that drain into the Cascade include Goat Lake, Sawback Lake, Elk Lake, and Cuthead Lake. The river also takes on Stoney Creek before entering the dramatic Stewart Canyon, then draining into Lake Minnewanka.

Prior to the Cascade Hydro Electric Development completion in 1942 the river exited the lake near the current day use area a flowed past the former town of Bankhead though what is now known as the Cascade Ponds. However currently the old river channel functions only as a spillway during flood events and most of the rivers water is diverted through a canal and penstock to the Cascade Powerhouse next to Highway 1 leaving the old river bed dry for most of the year. The Cascade project also included a small diversion dam directing some water from the Ghost River into Lake Minnewanka to increase the flow rate of water though the Cascade Powerhouse.

The Cascade River is named after Cascade Mountain. The mountain was named by Sir James Hector, who took the native name which meant "mountain where the water falls" and abbreviated the term to Cascade.

== See also ==
- List of Alberta rivers
