= Mount Charles Stewart =

Mountain in Banff NP, Alberta, Canada

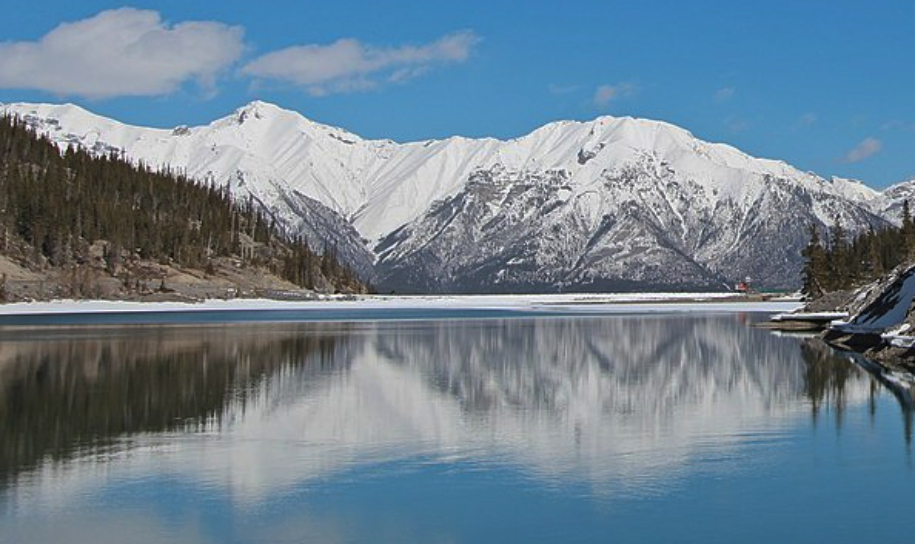
- Mount Charles Stewart (left) seen with Mount Lady McDonald (right)

Highest point
- Elevation: 2,809 m (9,216 ft)
- Prominence: 363 m (1,191 ft)
- Listing: Mountains of Alberta
- Coordinates: 51°09′18″N 115°19′59.9″W

Geography
- Location within Alberta
- Location: Alberta, Canada
- Parent range: Fairholme Range; Canadian Rockies
- Topo map: NTS 82O3 Canmore

Climbing
- First ascent: 1947
- Easiest route: rock climb

Mount Charles Stewart is a mountain located in the Bow River valley of Banff National Park in Canada.

The mountain was named in 1928 after Charles Stewart, who served as Premier of Alberta from 1917 to 1921.

== Geology ==
Mount Charles Stewart is composed of sedimentary rock laid down during the Precambrian to Jurassic periods. Formed in shallow seas, this sedimentary rock was pushed east and over the top of younger rock during the Laramide orogeny.

== Climate ==
Based on the Köppen climate classification, Mount Charles Stewart is located in a subarctic climate with cold, snowy winters, and mild summers. Temperatures can drop below −20 C with wind chill factors below −30 C. Precipitation runoff from Mount Charles Stewart drains into the Bow River which is a tributary of the Saskatchewan River.

== See also ==
- Geography of Alberta
- Anûkathâ Îpa
