= Mount Girouard =

Mountain in Alberta, Canada

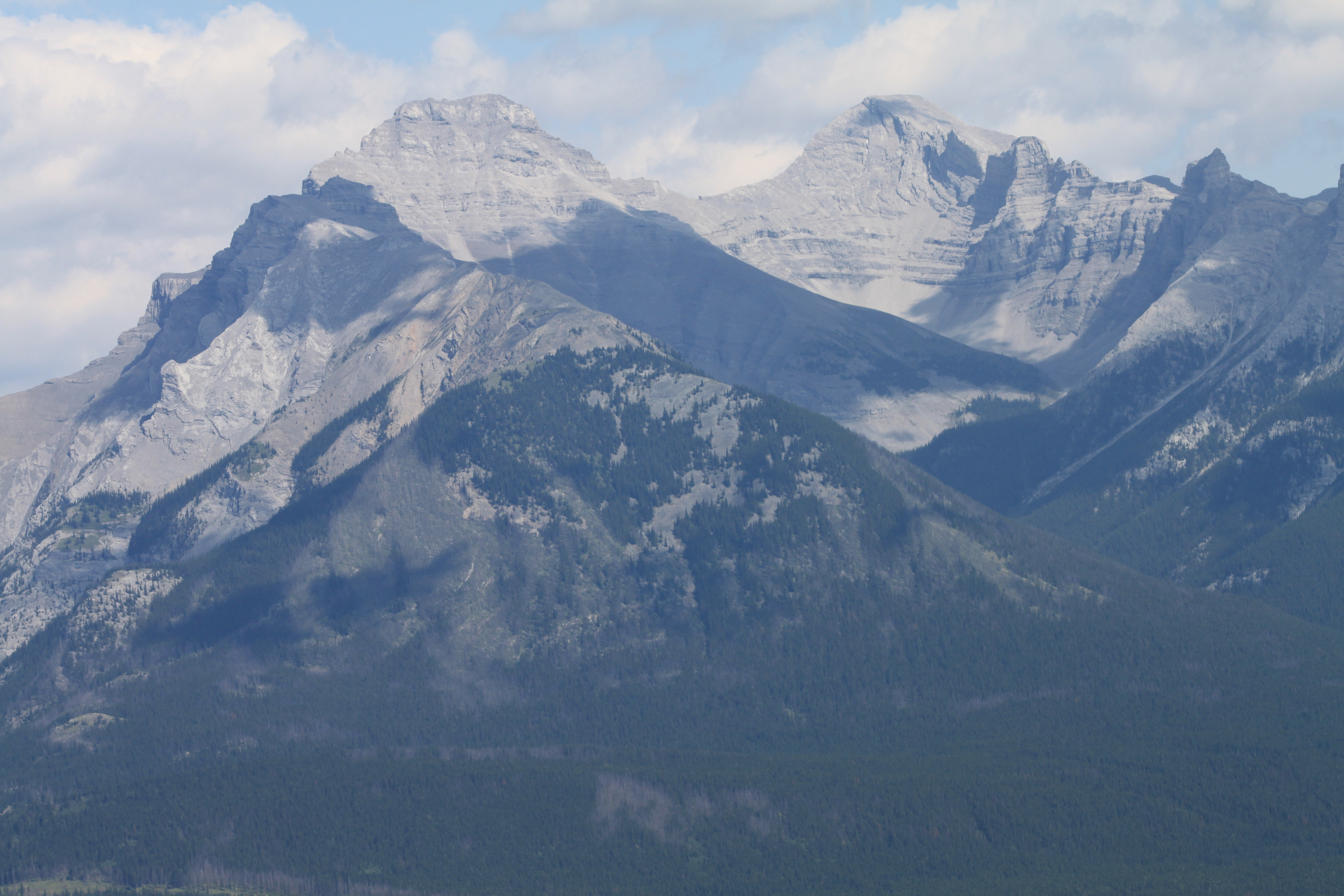
- Mount Inglismaldie (left) and Mount Girouard (right)

Highest point
- Elevation: 2,995 m (9,826 ft)
- Prominence: 1,455 m (4,774 ft)
- Listing: Mountains of Alberta
- Coordinates: 51°14′10″N 115°24′11″W

Geography
- Location within Alberta
- Country: Canada
- Province: Alberta
- Protected area: Banff National Park
- Parent range: Fairholme Range
- Topo map: NTS 82O3 Canmore

Climbing
- First ascent: 1938 by E.E. Bishop and D.R. Crosby
- Easiest route: rock climb

Mount Girouard is the highest peak of the Fairholme Range in Banff National Park, Alberta, Canada. Mt. Girouard is located in the Bow River valley south of Lake Minnewanka.

The mountain was named in 1904 after Sir Édouard Girouard, a railway builder in Africa during the rule of the British Empire.

== Geology ==
Mount Girouard is composed of sedimentary rock laid down during the Precambrian to Jurassic periods. Formed in shallow seas, this sedimentary rock was pushed east and over the top of younger rock during the Laramide orogeny.

== Climate ==
Based on the Köppen climate classification, Mount Girouard is located in a subarctic climate with cold, snowy winters, and mild summers. Temperatures can drop below −20 °C (−4 °F) with wind chill factors below −30 °C (−22 °F). Precipitation runoff from the mountain drains into the Bow River.

== Gallery ==
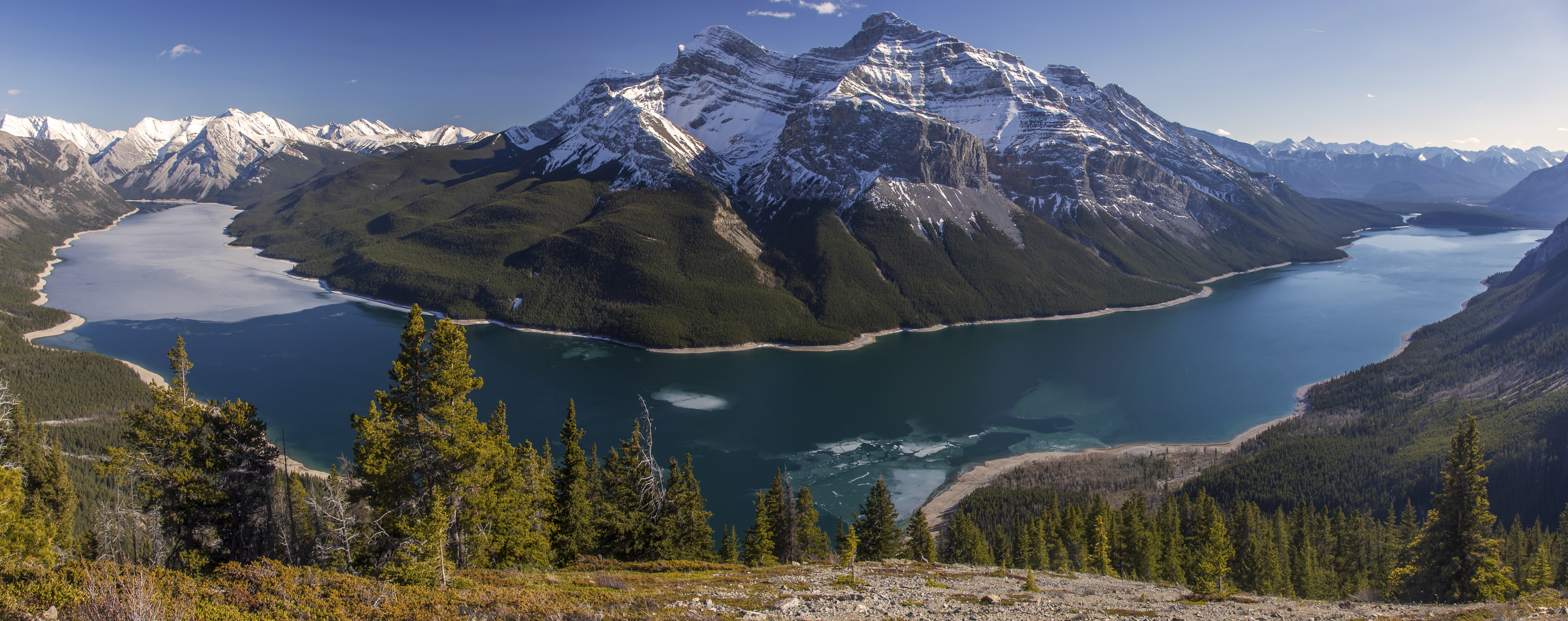
Lake Minnewanka and Mount Girouard

== See also ==
- Geology of Alberta
