= Lake Minnewanka =

Glacial lake in Alberta, Canada

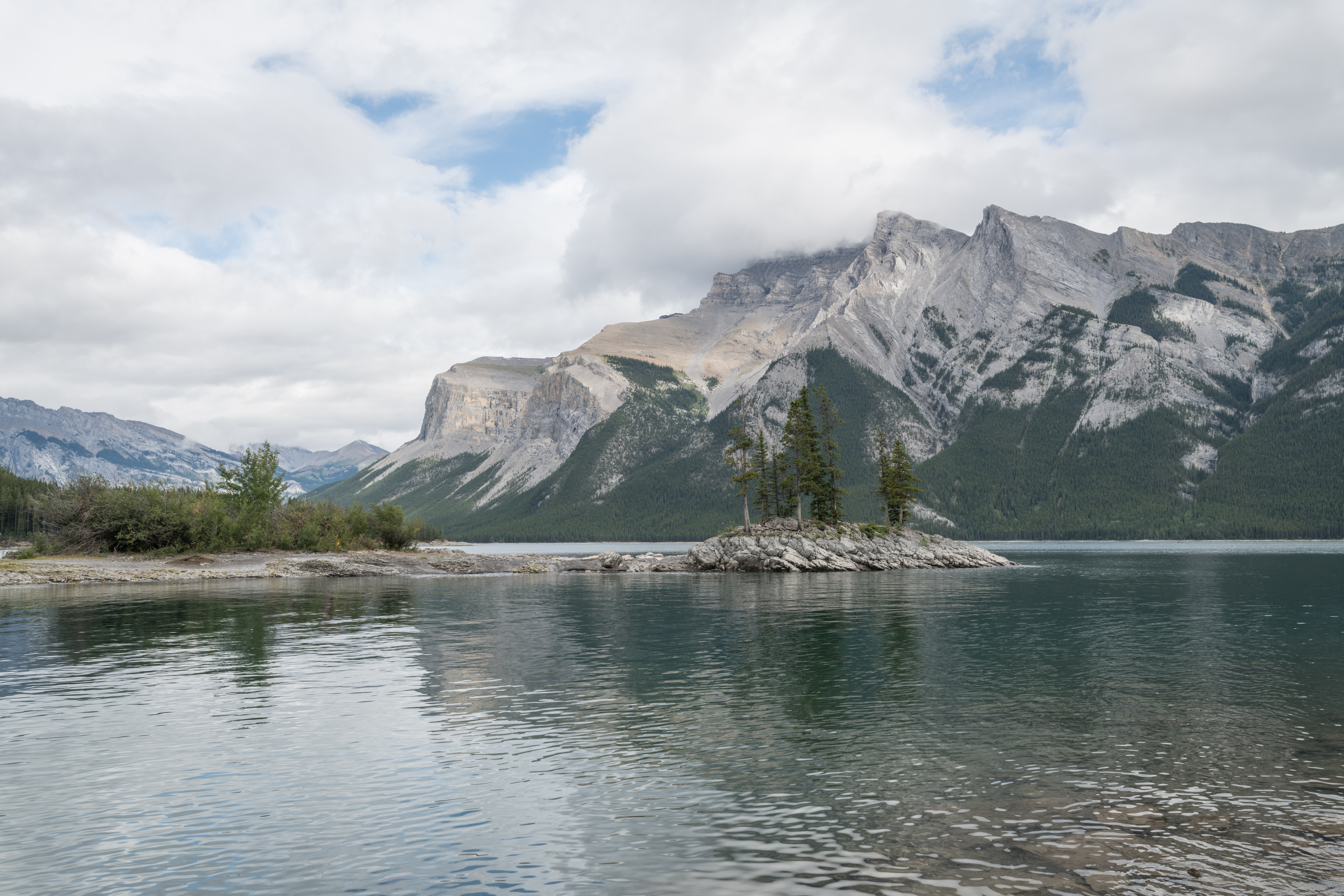
- Lake Minnewanka in August 2024

- Location within Alberta
- Location: Banff National Park, Alberta
- Coordinates: 51°15′29″N 115°22′23″W
- Lake type: reservoir, natural lake
- Primary inflows: Cascade River
- Basin countries: Canada
- Max. length: 28 km (17 mi)
- Max. depth: 142 m (466 ft)
- Surface elevation: 1,500 metres (4,900 ft)

Lake Minnewanka ( /ˌmɪnəˈwɑːŋkə/, 'water of the spirits' in Nakoda) is a glacial lake in the eastern area of Banff National Park in Canada, about five kilometres (3.1 miles) northeast of the Banff townsite. The lake is 21 km (13 mi) long and 142 m (466 ft) deep, making it the 2nd longest lake in the mountain parks of the Canadian Rockies (the result of a power dam at the west end).

The lake is fed by the Cascade River, flowing east of Cascade Mountain, and runs south through Stewart Canyon as it empties into the western end of the lake. Numerous streams flowing down from Mount Inglismaldie, Mount Girouard and Mount Peechee on the south side of the lake also feed the lake.

Aboriginal people long inhabited areas around Lake Minnewanka, as early as 10,000 years ago, according to stone tools and a Clovis point spearhead discovered by archaeologists. The area is rich in animal life (e.g. elk, mule deer, bighorn sheep, bears) and the easy availability of rock in the mountainous terrain was key to fashioning weapons for hunting.

The western end of the lake can be reached by following Lake Minnewanka Road from the Trans-Canada Highway. Boat tours are available near the parking lot. A hiking and mountain biking trail runs along the northern shore of the lake, passing Stewart Canyon and six backcountry campsites. Mount Aylmer, which at 3,162 m (10,374 ft) is the highest mountain in this area of the park, is a few kilometres north of the lake.

The first dam was built in 1912 only to store water. While the National Parks Act was suspended during the Second World War the much larger embankment dam that still exists was constructed in 1941 and raised the lake 30 m (98 ft). This resulted in the resort village of Minnewanka Landing, which had been there since 1888, being submerged and the Cascade River being diverted away from its old course, resulting in much of the riverbed downstream of the dam running dry for most of the year (except in rare high-water events when the dam's spillway is opened). Most water from the Cascade River is diverted into Two Jack Lake, where it enters a 4-kilometre-long canal. From there it is funnelled into a pair of penstocks feeding two generators in the Cascade Powerhouse with a combined capacity of 34 megawatts. The facility is owned by TransAlta and supplies power to the Banff townsite. To increase the amount of water entering the penstocks a small diversion dam was built on the Ghost River, which diverts additional water into Lake Minnewanka from the Ghost drainage. Because of the presence of the submerged village, submerged bridge pilings, and submerged dam (the one from 1912) the lake is popular among recreational scuba divers. The construction of the dam resulted in involuntary resettlement of inhabitants from the reservoir area.

== Gallery ==
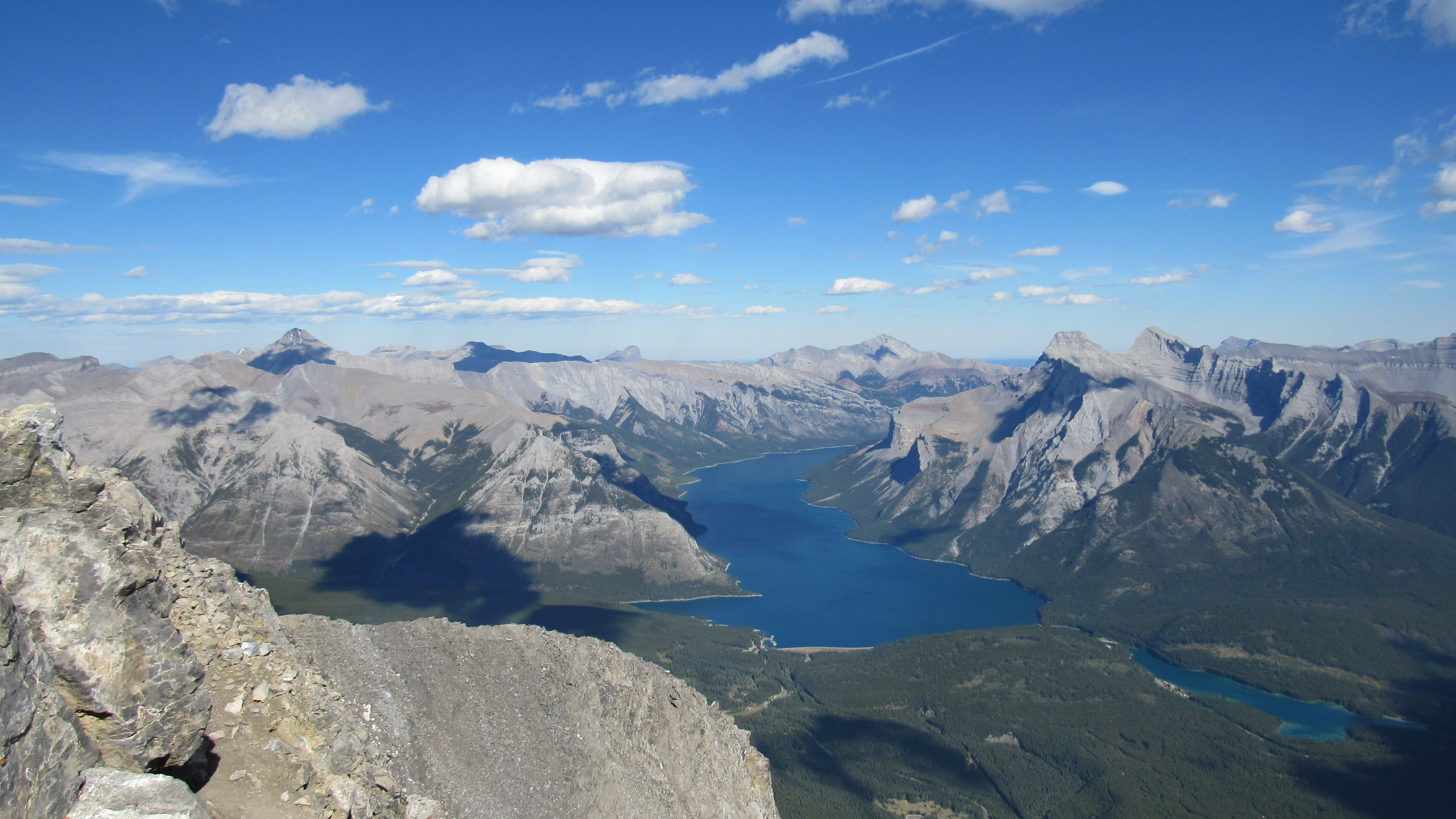
Lake Minnewanka seen from Cascade Mountain Summit

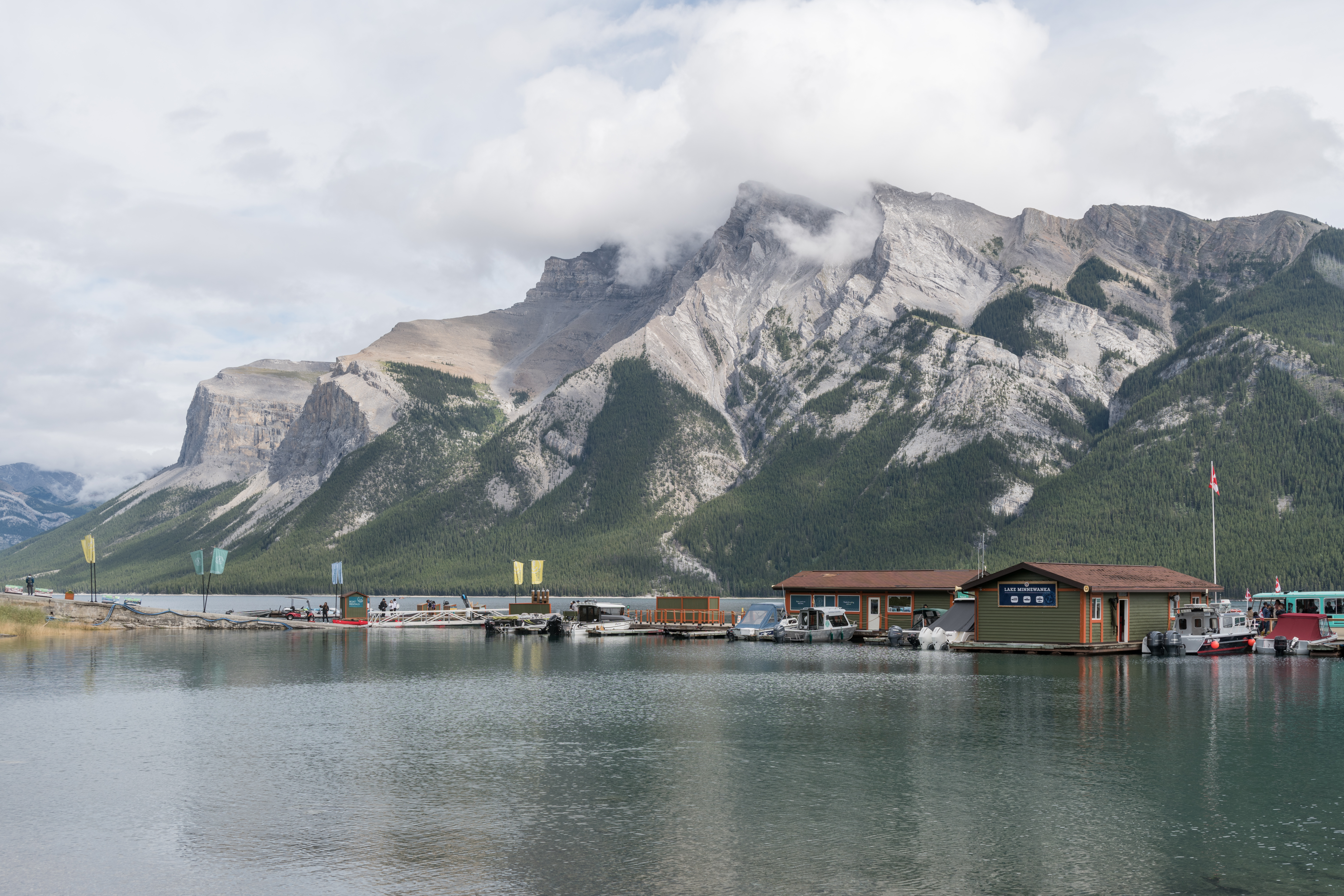
Lake Minnewanka boat pier

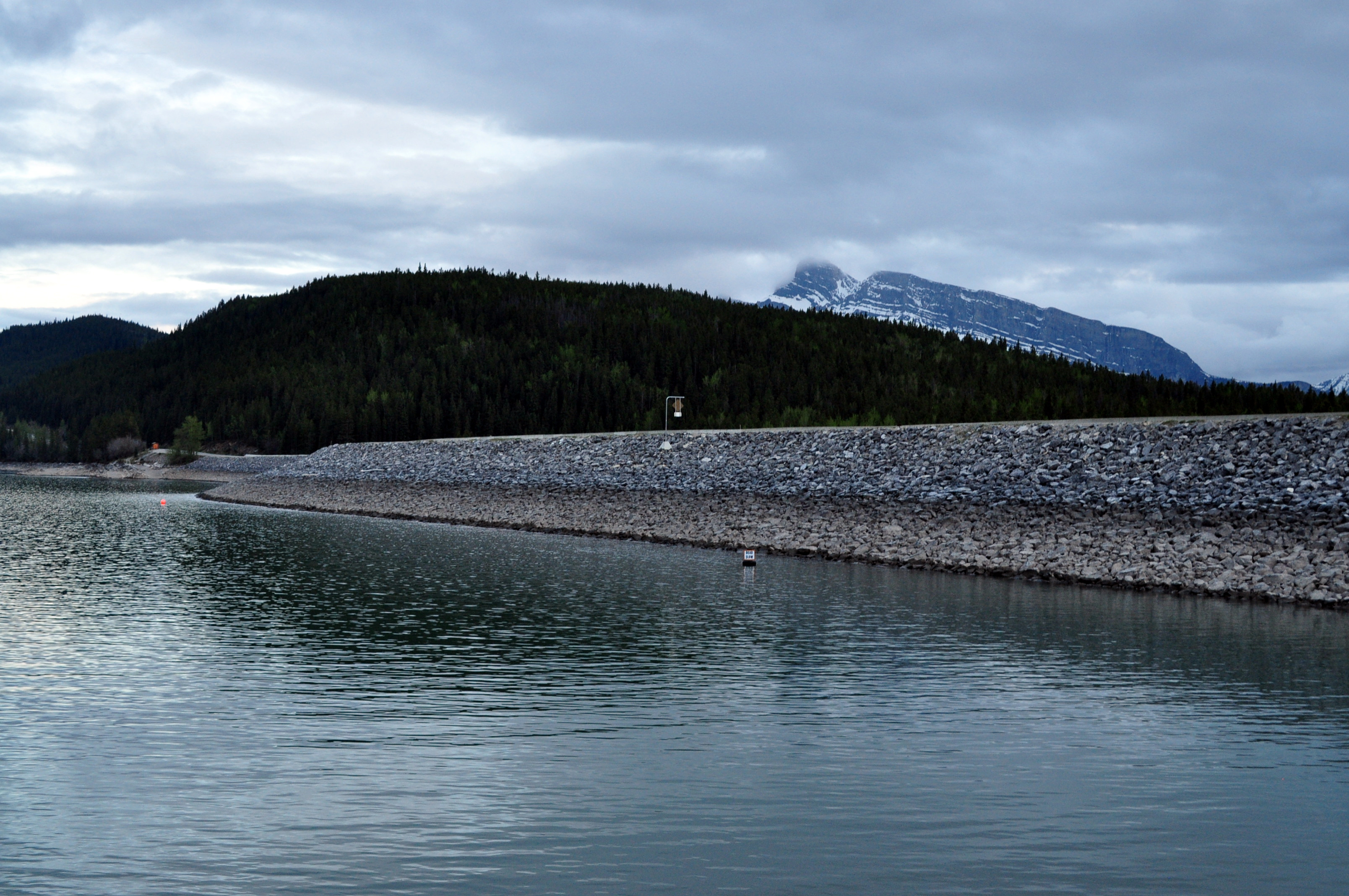
Lake Minnewanka

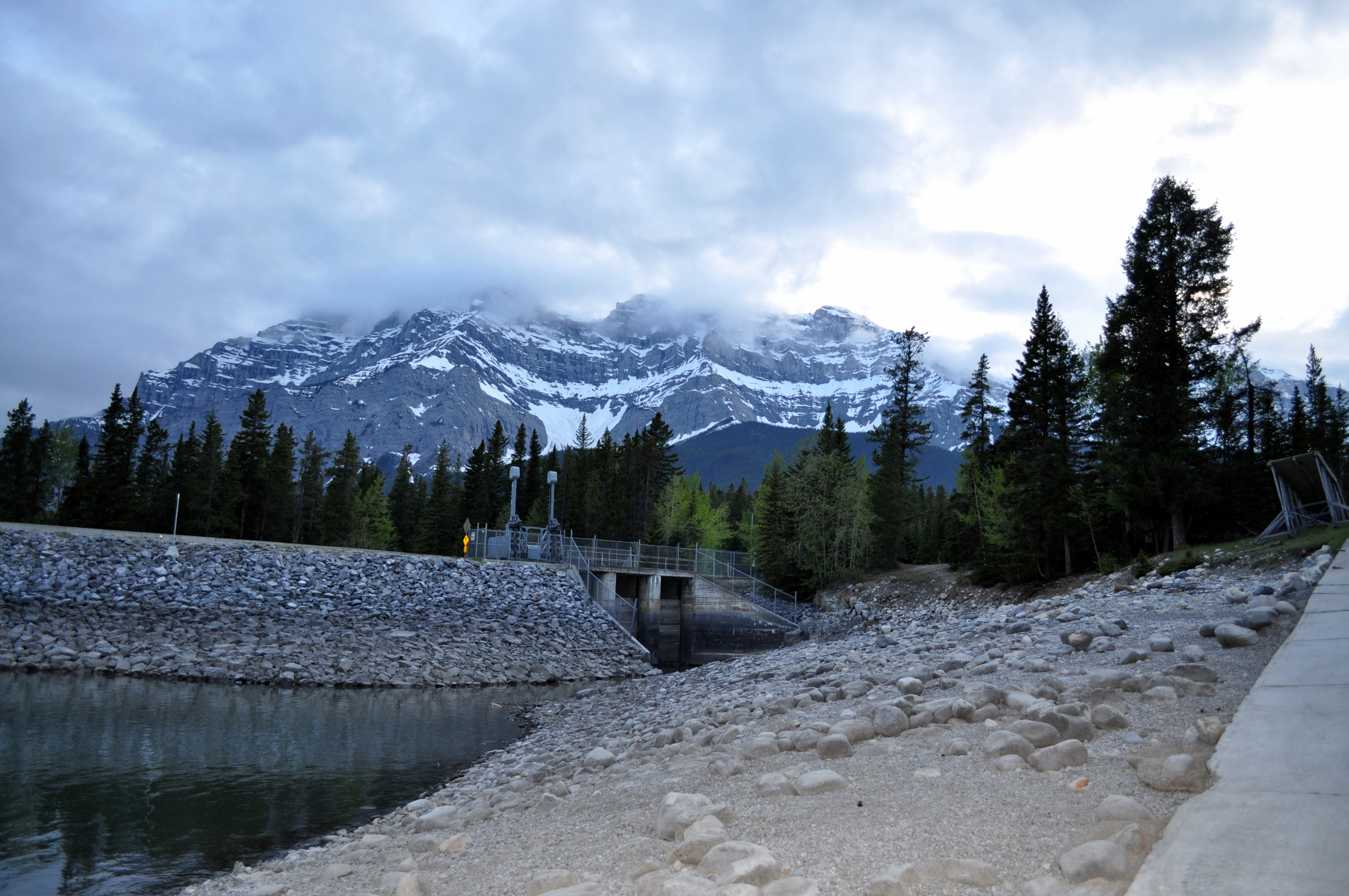
Lake Minnewanka

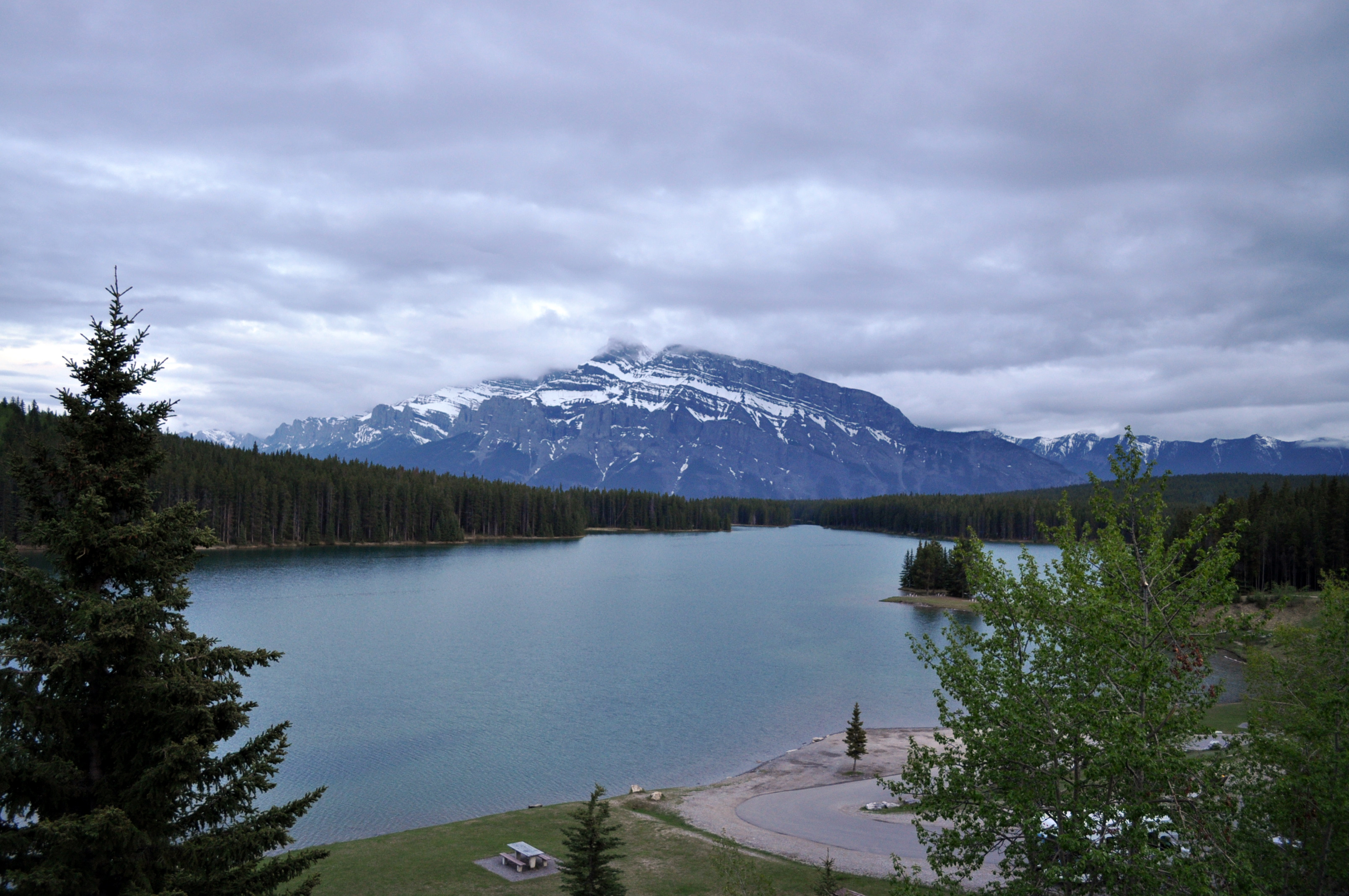
Two Jack Lake

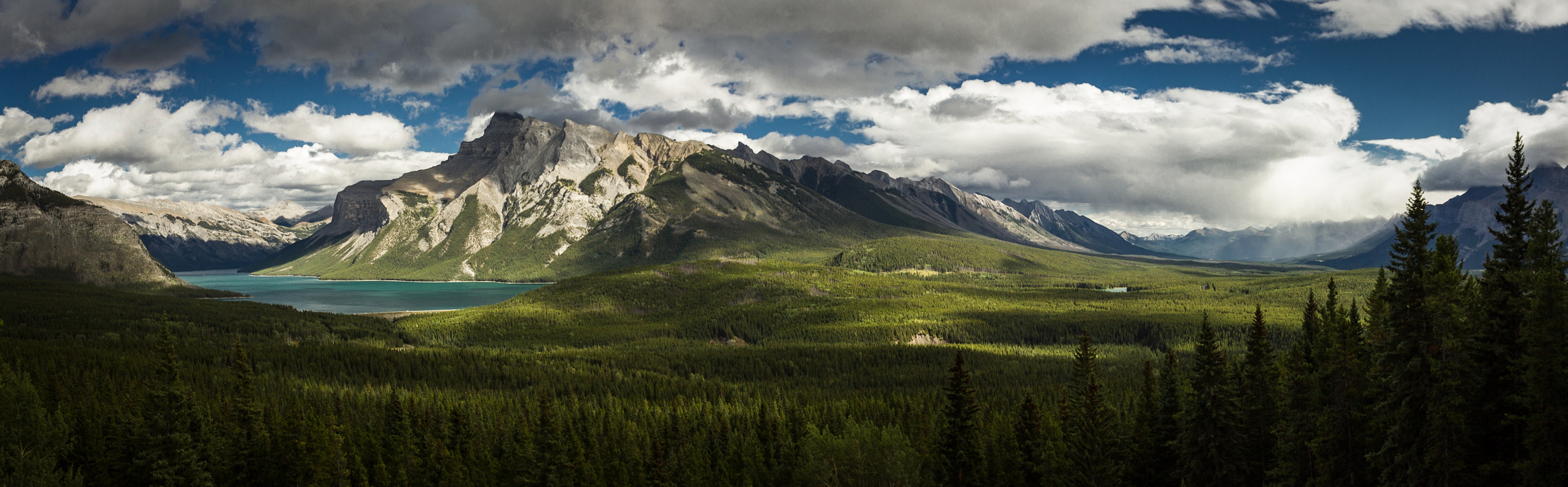
Lake Minnewanka and Bow River Valley

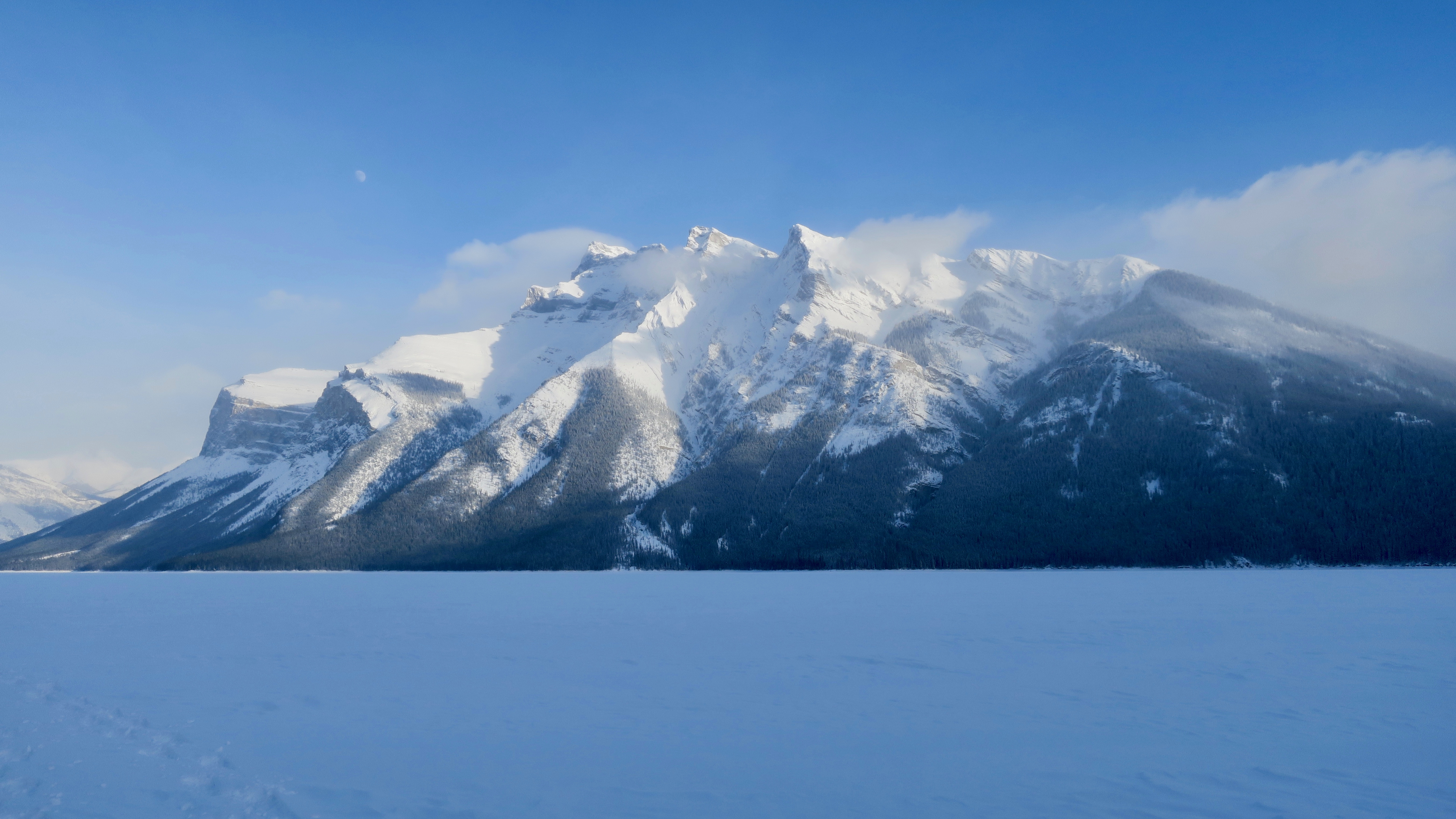
Lake Minnewanka in winter

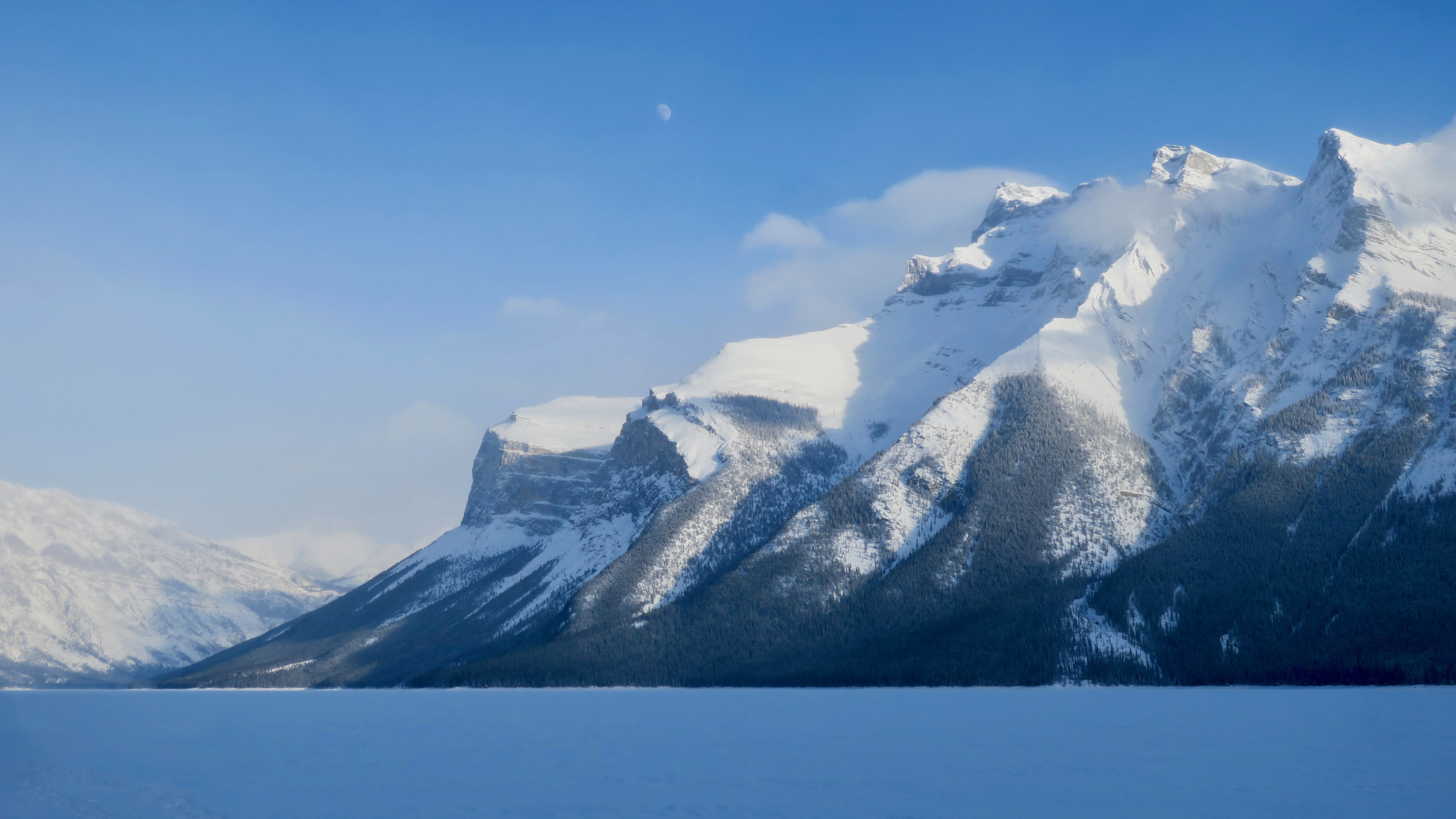
Lake Minnewanka in winter

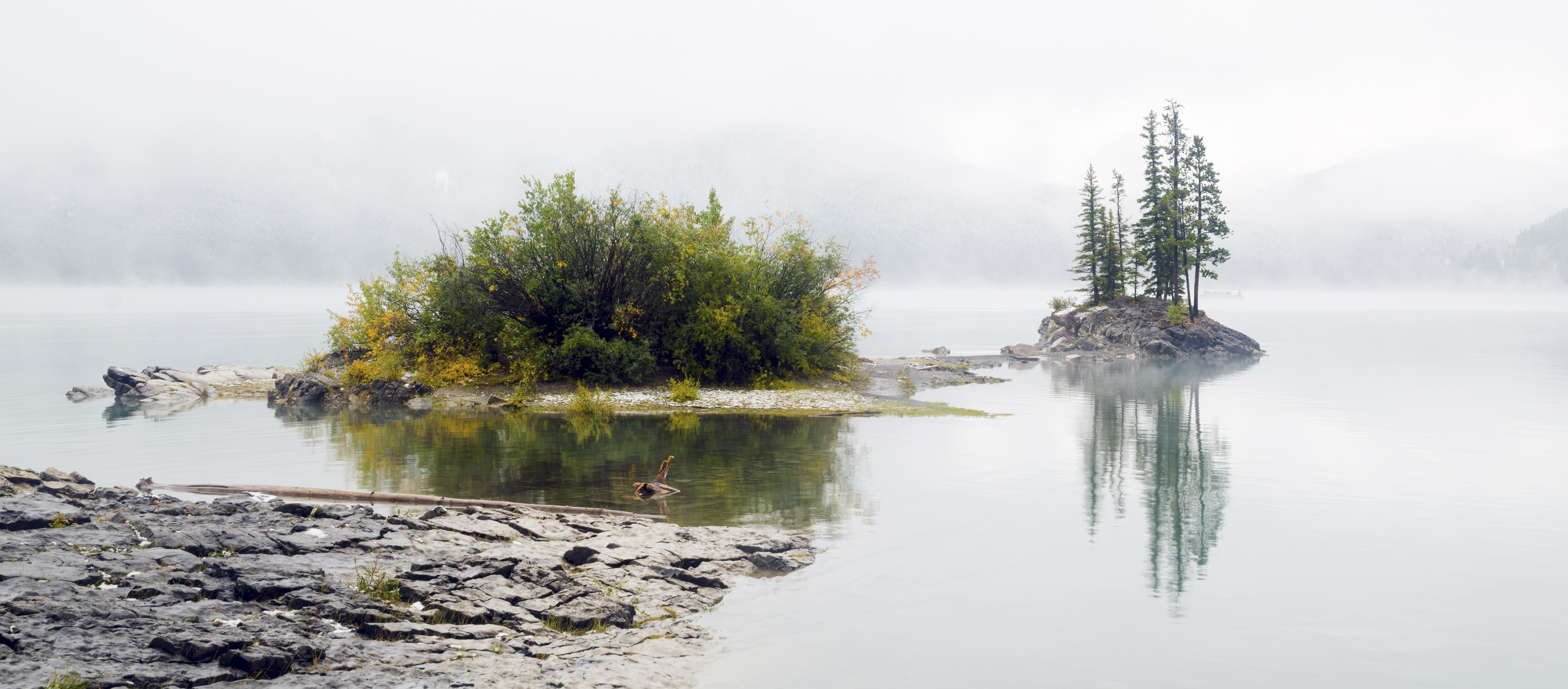
Misty Minnewanka lake in late fall

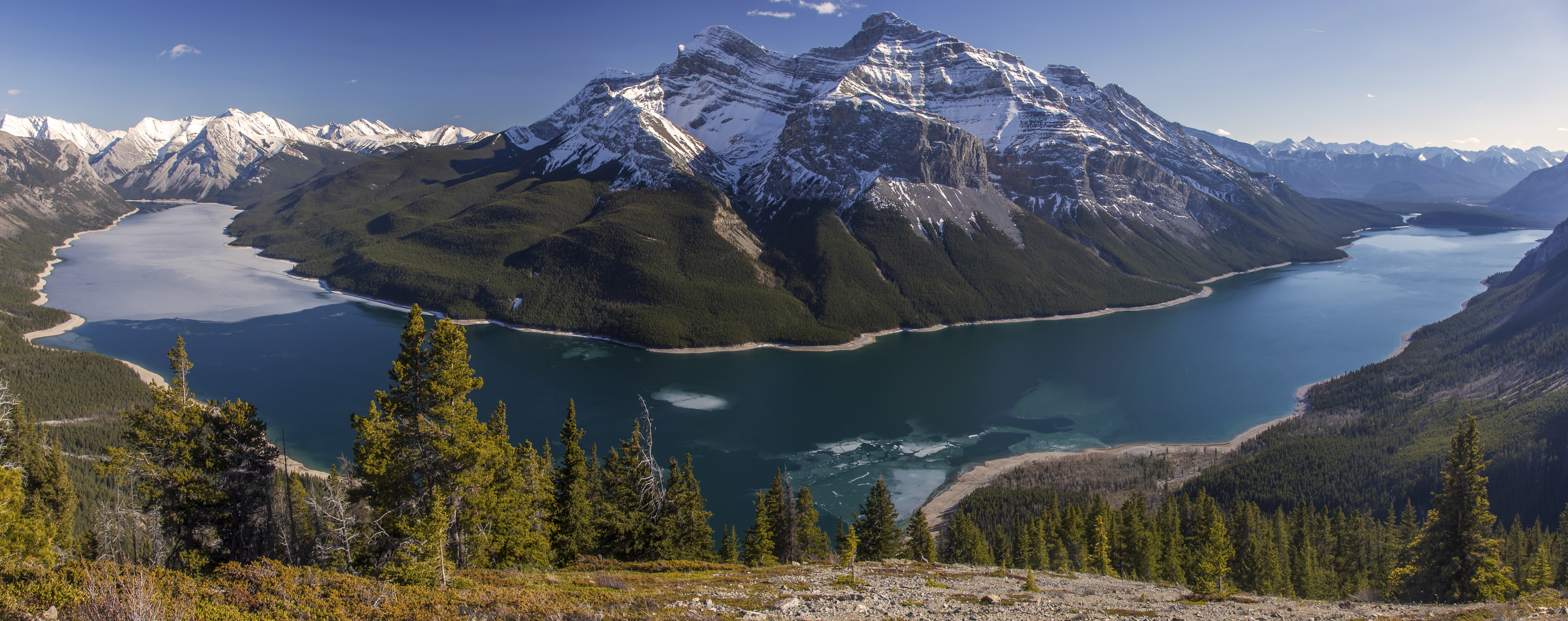
Panorama of the lake

== See also ==
- Lakes of Alberta
