= Brewster =

Brewster may refer to:

== People and fictional characters ==
- Brewster (surname), including a list of people and fictional characters
- Brewster (given name), a list of people and fictional characters
- Brewster Hughes (1912–1986), born Ignatius Abiodun Oke, Nigerian guitarist, bandleader and community leader in Britain
- James Thompson (judoka), American former judo competitor nicknamed "Brewster"

== Places ==
=== United States ===
- Brewster, Florida, a ghost town
- Brewster, Kansas, a city
- Brewster, Massachusetts, a town
  - Brewster (CDP), Massachusetts, a census-designated place within the town
- Brewster, Minnesota, a city
- Brewster, Nebraska, a village
- Brewster, New York, a village
  - Brewster station, a commuter rail station
- Brewster, Ohio, a village
- Brewster, Washington, a city
  - Brewster Bridge, a highway bridge over the Columbia River
- Brewster County, Texas
- Brewster Creek, Akron, Ohio
- Hamilton Park (New Haven), formerly Brewster Park, a sports venue

=== Elsewhere ===
- Mount Brewster, Daniell Peninsula, Victoria Land, Antarctica
- Brewster Lake, British Columbia, Canada
- Mount Brewster (Canada), Banff National Park, Alberta
- Mount Brewster (New Zealand), in the Southern Alps
- Cape Brewster, Greenland
- Brewster Park (Enniskillen), Northern Ireland, a Gaelic sports ground
- Brewster (crater), The Moon

== Buildings in the United States ==
- Brewster Apartments, a historic building in Chicago
- Brewster Building (Galt, California), on the National Register of Historic Places
- Brewster Building (Queens), New York, formerly a historic car and airplane manufacturing plant, later JetBlue headquarters
- Brewster-Douglass Housing Projects, former public housing development in Detroit
- Brewster House (disambiguation)

== Businesses ==
- Brewster & Co., American coachbuilders and automobile maker and a brand of automobile
  - Brewster Aeronautical Corporation, the aircraft manufacturing division
- Brewster Jennings & Associates, a front company set up by the CIA

== Education in the United States ==
- Brewster Academy, a boarding school in New Hampshire
- Brewster High School (disambiguation)
- Brewster Central School District, New York

== Science ==
- Brewster (unit), a unit of measure named after David Brewster
- Edinburgh Encyclopædia, 1808–1830 publication edited by David Brewster
- Brewster Medal, awarded by the American Ornithologists' Union

== Sports ==
- Brewster Bulldogs, a short-lived minor league professional ice hockey team based in Brewster, New York
- Brewster Whitecaps, a collegiate summer baseball team based in Brewster, Massachusetts

== Other uses ==
- Brewster Chair, a style of chair formerly made in New England
- Brewster Color, a color film system
- Brewster Hospital, Duval County, Florida, US
- Brewster Body Shield, a prototype World War I body armor
- Brewster (police dog), (2004-2017), the longest serving police dog in Britain

== See also ==
- Brewster's angle, a physics concept
- Islands in Boston Harbor
  - Great Brewster Island
  - Little Brewster Island
  - Middle Brewster Island
  - Outer Brewster Island
- Brewer (disambiguation)
