= Mount Brewster =

Mount Brewster may refer to:

== Antarctica ==
- Mount Brewster, a mountain on the Daniell Peninsula, Victoria Land, Antarctica

== Canada ==
- Mount Brewster (Canada), a mountain in the Vermilion Range of Banff National Park

== New Zealand ==
- Mount Brewster (New Zealand), a mountain in the Southern Alps
