= Koton =

Koton may refer to:

- Koton (dog), German Shepherd dog appearing in films including K-9
- Koton (company), Turkish clothing company
- Koton, Sakhalin Oblast location in Sakhalin involved in Evacuation of Karafuto and Kuriles
