= Rando =

Rando may refer to:

- a short Germanic name, from names beginning with the element rand "shield"
- Rando (king), 4th century king of the Alemanni
- Rando Ayamine (born 1974), manga artist
- Rando (YuYu Hakusho), a fictional character from the anime and manga series YuYu Hakusho
- Rando (dog), or Koton, dog featuring in the film K-9
