= Stoney Mountain =

Mountain in Alberta, Canada

- Stoney (covered in trees) with Cascade Mountain in background

Highest point
- Elevation: 1,868 m (6,129 ft)
- Coordinates: 51°12′2.25″N 115°34′39.6″W

Geography
- Country: Canada
- Province: Alberta
- Parent range: Vermilion Range
- Topo map: NTS 82O4 Banff

Climbing
- Easiest route: Scramble

Stoney Mountain, also known as Stoney Squaw Mountain, is a mountain in the Bow River Valley of Banff National Park, adjacent to the town of Banff, Alberta, Canada.

Stoney Mountain is located between Cascade Mountain and Mount Norquay, in the Vermilion Range of the Canadian Rockies. Stoney is the second smallest mountain adjacent to the townsite, taller only than Tunnel Mountain. It is much rounder than many of the other mountains nearby.

Ernest Ingersoll wrote in his 1892 "Canadian Guide Book" that the mountain takes its name "from the traditional story that some years ago a brave old Assiniboine woman sustained her husband, who lay sick for several months in their lodge at its base, by hunting upon its top and sides, where there are open glades which still form favourite spring feeding-places for the big-horn or mountain sheep. The name became official in 1922. The adjacent Cascade Mountain used to be referred to as Stoney Chief, though this name is now largely defunct.

The "Stoney Squaw" name is derogatory and Parks Canada is working with local Indigenous groups to propose a new name.
