= Brewster House =

Brewster House may refer to:

== United States ==
- Brewster House (Galt, California), listed on the NRHP in California
- Brewster-Dutra House, in Paso Robles, CA, listed on the NRHP in California
- Brewster Homestead Griswold, CT, listed on the NRHP in Connecticut
- Royal Brewster House in Buxton, ME, listed on the NRHP in Maine
- Walter Brewster House in Brewster, NY, listed on the NRHP in New York
- Oliver Brewster House, in Cornwall, NY, listed on the NRHP in New York
- Brewster House (East Setauket, New York), listed on the NRHP in New York
- Jonathan Child House & Brewster–Burke House Historic District, Rochester, NY, listed on the NRHP in New York
- Angell-Brewster House, Lebanon, OR, listed on the NRHP in Oregon
