= Brian Walton (bishop) =

British bishop and scholar

The Right Reverend Brian Walton
- Bishop of Chester
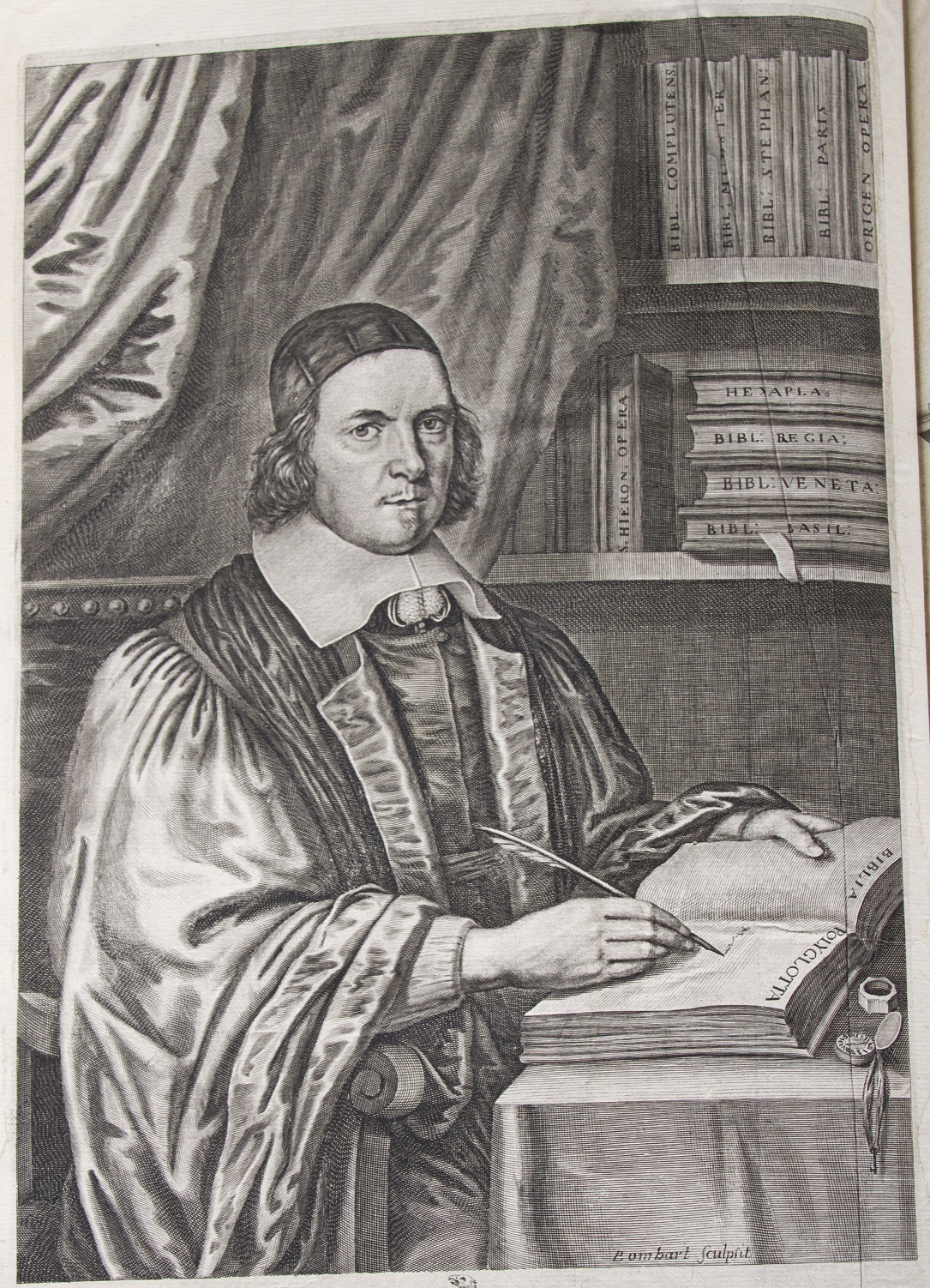
- Engraving by Wenceslaus Hollar (1654)

Orders
- Consecration: 2 December 1660 by Accepted Frewen

Personal details
- Born: 1600 Seymour, Yorkshire
- Died: 29 November 1661 (aged 60–61)
- Denomination: Anglican
- Spouse: Anne Claxton; Jane Fuller
- Occupation: Priest, scholar
- Education: Cambridge

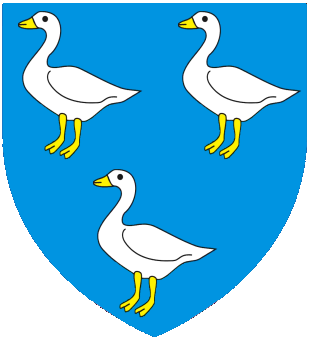
Arms: Three geese passant close [no tinctures given]

Brian Walton (1600 – 29 November 1661) was an English Anglican priest, divine and scholar. He is mostly remembered for his polyglot Bible.

== Life ==
Walton was born at Seymour, in the district of Cleveland, Yorkshire. His early education was at the Newcastle Royal Free Grammar School. He went up to Cambridge as a sizar of Magdalene College in 1616, migrated to Peterhouse in 1618, was bachelor in 1619 and Master of Arts in 1623. After holding a school mastership at Suffolk and two curacies (the second as curate of All-hallows, Bread Street), he was made rector of St Martin's Ongar in London, and of Sandon, in Essex, in 1626. At St Martin's Ongar he took a leading part in the contest between the London clergy and the citizens about the city tithes, and compiled a treatise on the subject, which is printed in Brewster's Collectanea (1752). His conduct in this matter displayed his ability, but his zeal for the exaction of ecclesiastical dues was remembered in 1641 in the articles brought against him in parliament, which appear to have led to the sequestration of his very considerable preferments. (Note: He was from January 1635 to 1636 rector of Sandon, in Essex, where his first wife, Anne Claxton, is buried. He appears to have also been a prebendary of St Paul's, and for a very short time he had held the rectory of St Giles in the Fields.) He was also charged with Popish practices, but on frivolous grounds, and with aspersing the members of parliament for the city. His arms were: Three geese passant close.

He was buried in Old St Paul's Cathedral in London, but the grave and monument were destroyed in the Great Fire of London in 1666. His name appears on a modern monument in the crypt, listing important graves lost in the fire.

== Polyglot Bible ==
The proposals for the Polyglot appeared in 1652. The book itself came out in six great folios. The first volume appeared in September 1654; the second in July 1655; the third in July 1656; and the last three in 1657. Nine languages are used: Hebrew, Aramaic, Samaritan, Syriac, Arabic, Persian, Ethiopic, Greek and Latin. Among his collaborators were James Ussher, John Lightfoot and Edward Pococke, Edmund Castell, Abraham Wheelocke and Patrick Young, Thomas Hyde and Thomas Greaves. The great undertaking was the first in England supported by subscription - £50 each. Walton's political opinions did not deprive him of the help of the Commonwealth; the paper used was freed from duty, and the interest of Cromwell in the work was acknowledged in the original preface, part of which was afterwards cancelled to make way for more loyal expressions towards that restored monarchy under which Oriental studies in England immediately began to languish. Two versions of the work, one dedicated to Cromwell, and the other known as the "Loyal" one. To Walton himself, however, the Restoration brought no disappointment: he was elected Bishop of Chester on 19 October 1660, confirmed to that See 22 November, and consecrated a bishop on 2 December 1660. In the following spring he was one of the commissioners at the Savoy Conference, but took little part in the business. In the autumn of 1661 he paid a short visit to his diocese, and returning to London he died.

According to an assessment in Chisholm (1911):

However much Walton was indebted to his helpers, the Polyglot Bible is a great monument of industry and of capacity for directing a vast undertaking, and the Prolegomena (separately reprinted by Dathe, 1777, and by Francis Wrangham, 1825) show judgment as well as learning. The same qualities appear in Walton's Considerator Considered (1659), a reply to the Considerations of John Owen, who thought that the accumulation of material for the revision of the received text tended to atheism. Among Walton's works must also be mentioned an Introductio ad lectionem linguarum orientalium (1654; 2nd ed., 1655), meant to prepare the way for the Polyglot.

== Manuscripts used by Walton ==
- Codex Montfortianus
- Minuscule 47
- Minuscule 57
- Minuscule 96
- Minuscule 2818

== Notes ==
Church of England titles
Preceded by John Bridgeman	Bishop of Chester; 1660–1661	Succeeded by Henry Ferne
