= Minuscule 57 =

- New Testament manuscript
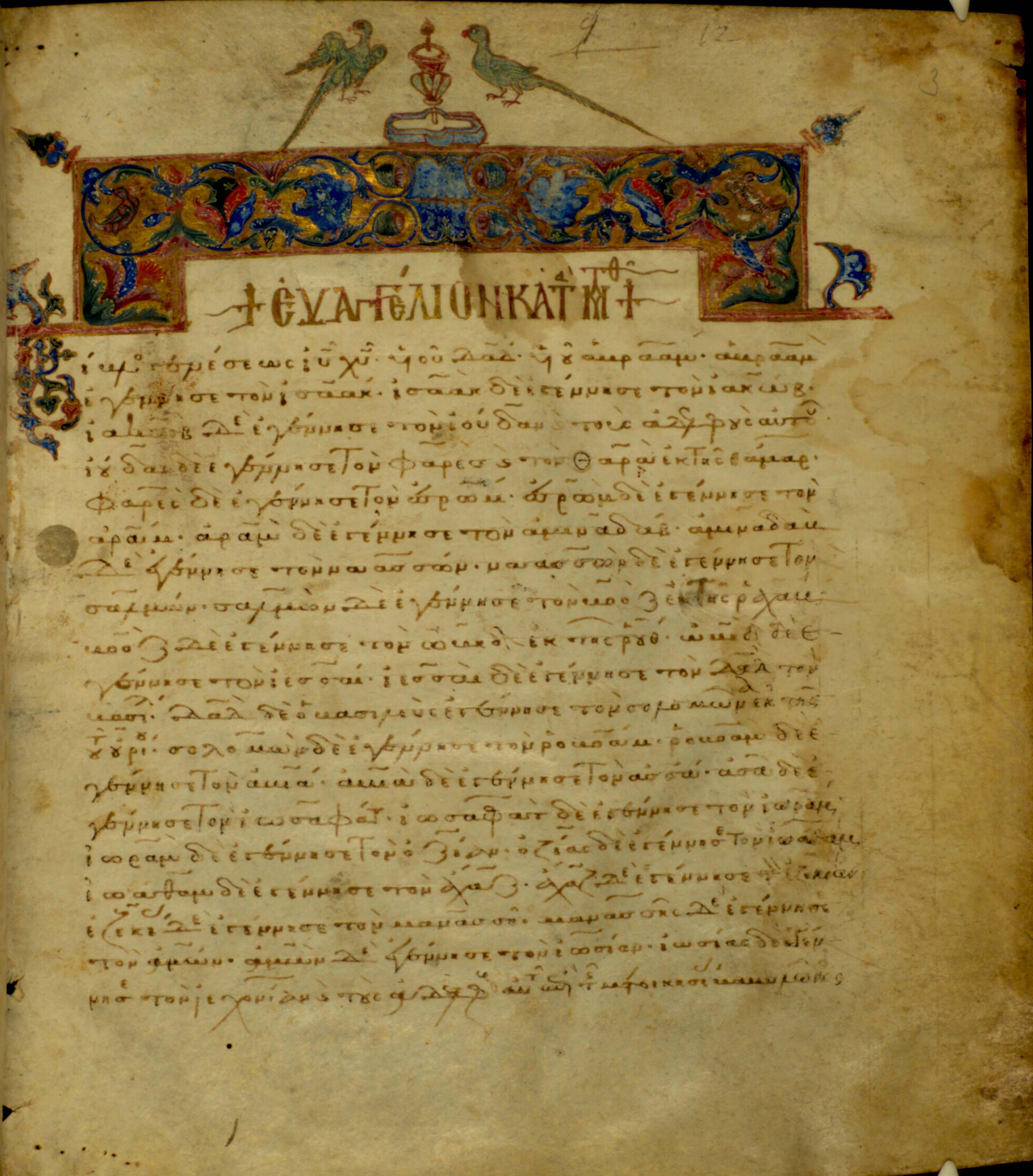
- The first page of Matthew
- Text: New Testament (except Rev.)
- Date: 12th century
- Script: Greek
- Now at: Magdalen College
- Size: 22.5 cm by 19 cm
- Type: Byzantine text-type
- Category: V
- Hand: beautifully written
- Note: marginalia

Minuscule 57 is a Greek minuscule manuscript of the New Testament and the Psalms, written on parchment. It is designated by the siglum 57 in the Gregory-Aland numbering of New Testament manuscripts, as δ 255 in the von Soden numbering of New Testament manuscripts, and as 69 in the Rahlfs numbering of Greek Septuagint manuscripts. Using the study of comparative writing styles (palaeography), it has been assigned to the 12th century. The manuscript has some gaps. It has marginalia.

== Description ==
The manuscript is a codex (precursor to the modern book format), containing the entirety of the New Testament except the Book of Revelation, on 291 parchment leaves (size 22.5 cm × 19 cm (8.9 in × 7.5 in)), with two gaps (Mark 1:1-11 and at the end). The leaves are arranged in quarto (four leaves in quire) form. The text is written in one column per page, 25 lines per page. The Psalms and Hymns follow the Epistles. The initial letters and headpieces are illuminated. It has accents and breathings, and contains the nomina sacra (special names/words considered sacred in Christianity - usually the first and last letters of the name/word in question are written, followed by an overline; sometimes other letters from within the word are used as well) throughout. The initial letters are in gold. According to Biblical scholar Frederick H. A. Scrivener, it is written in small, beautiful letters with abbreviations, a sentiment also echoed by biblical scholar Orlando Dobbin, who describes the letters as "exquisite, very small, marked by a perfect uniformity, and full of rather puzzling but symmetrical flourishes and contractions."

It contains the tables of contents (known as κεφαλαια / kephalaia) before the Gospels of Matthew, Luke, and John (and likely also before the Gospel of Mark, but the leaves are missing). The text is divided according to the chapters (also known as κεφαλαια), whose numbers are given in the margin, and their titles (known as τιτλοι / titloi) at the top of the pages. It contains lectionary markings in the margin (used to assist with finding the correct reading on a Sunday during the church calendar), written in red ink (for liturgical use), but added by a later hand.

The manuscript is arranged in the following order:

κεφαλαια to Matthew
Gospel of Matthew
Gospel of Mark
κεφαλαια to Luke
Gospel of Luke
κεφαλαια to John
Gospel of John
Acts of the Apostles
The Seven Catholic Epistles
The Epistles of Paul with Hebrews
The Psalms
Hymns from the Old and New Testament

== Text ==
The Greek text of the codex is considered a representative of the Byzantine text-type. The text-types are groups of different New Testament manuscripts which share specific or generally related readings, which then differ from each other group, and thus the conflicting readings can separate out the groups. These are then used to determine the original text as published; there are three main groups with names: Alexandrian, Western, and Byzantine. Textual critic Kurt Aland placed it in Category V of his New Testament manuscript classification system. Category V is for "Manuscripts with a purely or predominantly Byzantine text." It was not examined using the Claremont Profile Method.

== History ==
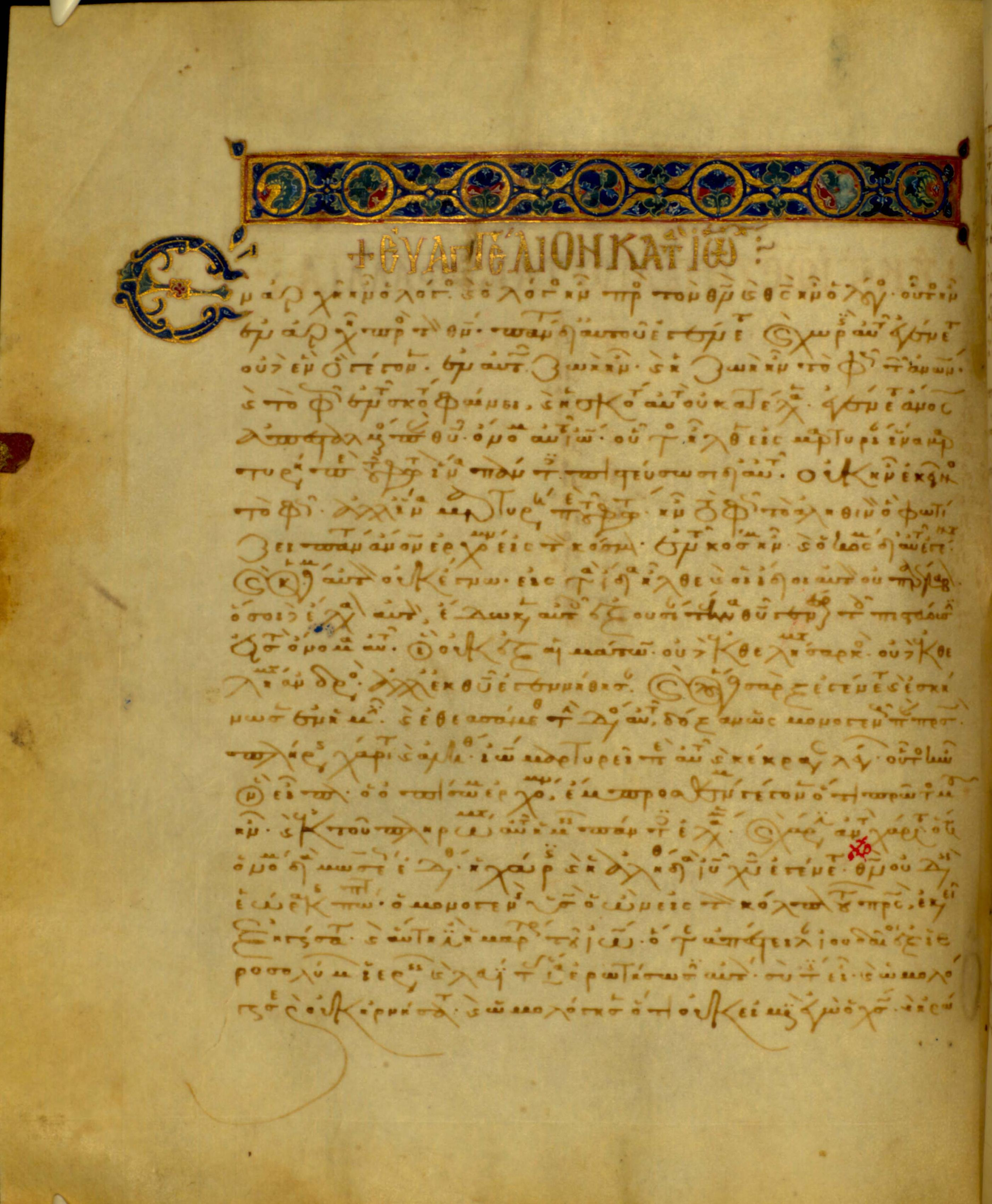
Folio 91 verso with the first page of John

The manuscript was likely written in Constantinople, in the 3rd quarter of the 12th century, with additions up to the end of the 14th century including a note relating to Epeiros.

Bishop Brian Walton used it for a Polyglot (as Magd. 1). Henry Hammond collated the manuscript twice. It was also examined by textual critic Johann Jakob Wettstein in 1715, Dobbin (for theologian John Mill), and biblical scholar Caspar René Gregory saw it in 1883. It is currently housed in the Magdalen College (shelf number Gr. 9), at Oxford in England.

== See also ==
- List of New Testament minuscules
- Biblical manuscript
- Textual criticism
