= Police dog =

Dog trained and used for law enforcement

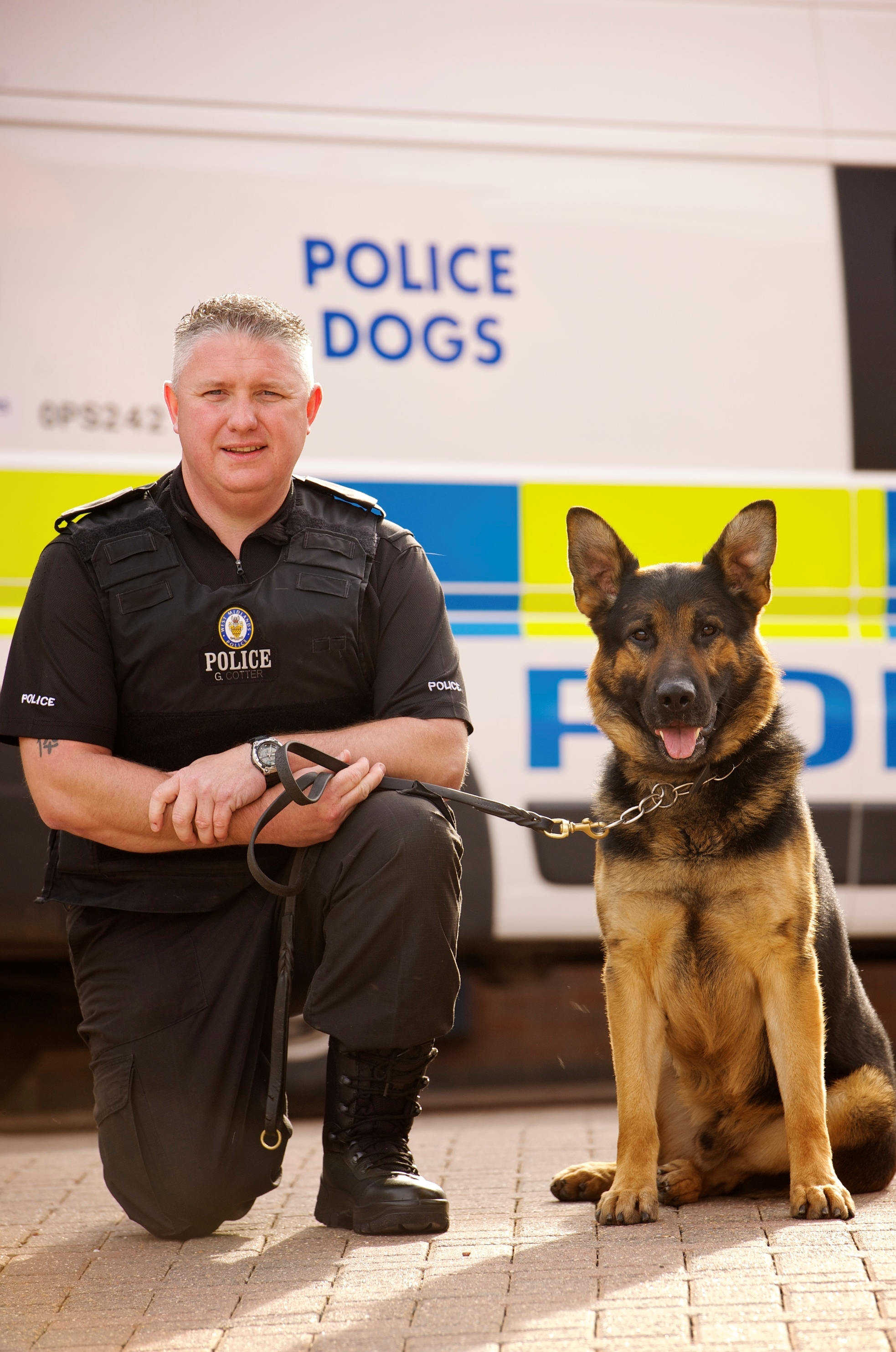
A German Shepherd of the West Midlands Police

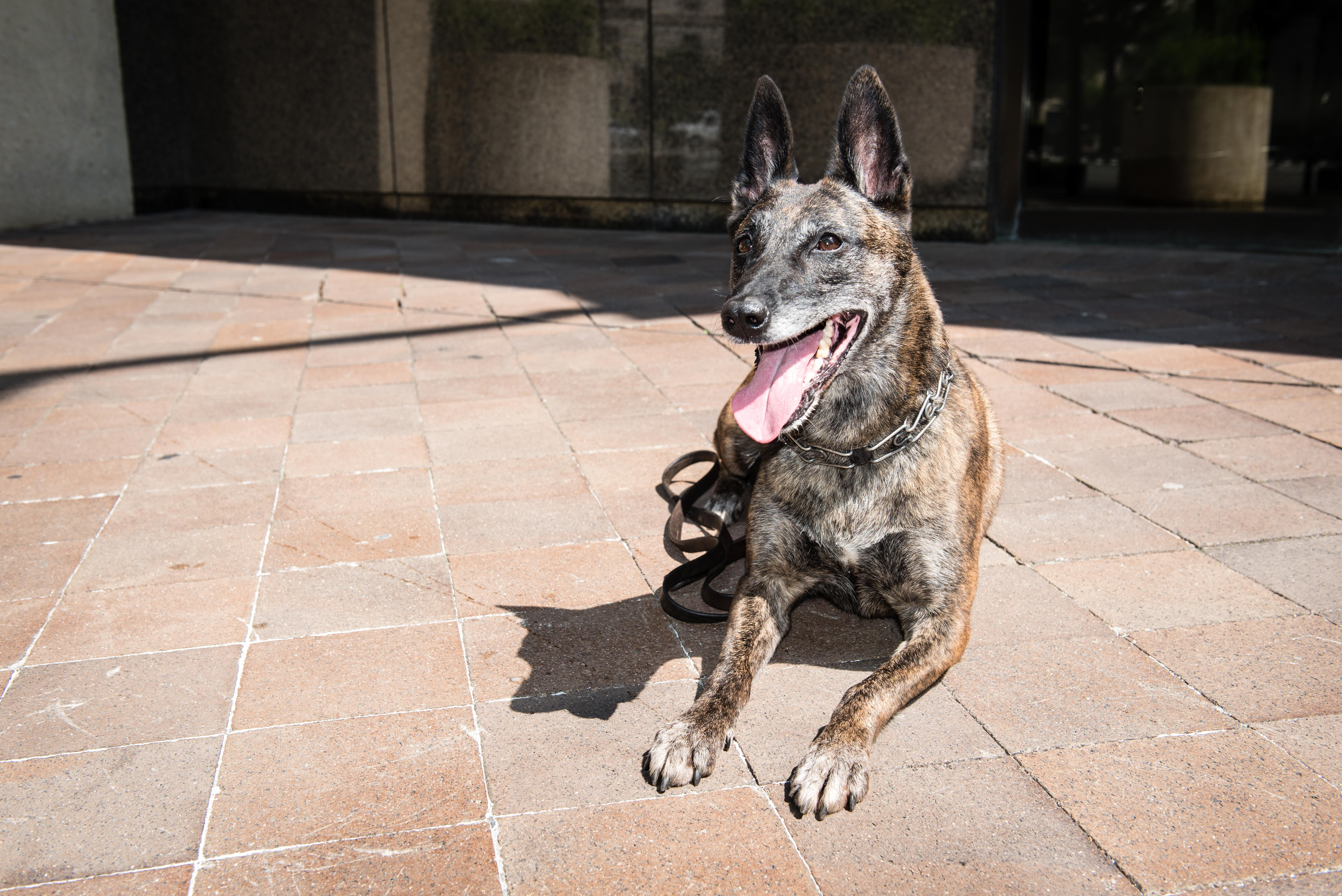
An FBI Dutch Shepherd police dog

A police dog, also known as a K-9 (phonemic abbreviation of "canine"), is a dog that is trained to assist police and other law enforcement officers. Their duties may include searching for drugs, explosives, locating missing people, finding crime scene evidence, protecting officers and other people, and attacking suspects who flee from officers. The breeds most commonly used by law enforcement are the German Shepherd, Belgian Malinois, Bloodhound, Dutch Shepherd, and Labrador Retriever. In recent years, the Belgian Malinois has become the leading choice for police and military work due to their intense drive, focus, agility, and smaller size, though German Shepherds remain the breed most associated with law enforcement.

Police dogs are used on a national and local level for law enforcement purposes in many parts of the world. They are often assigned to what in some nations is referred to as a K-9 unit, with a specific handler, and must remember several verbal cues and hand gestures. Initial training for a police dog typically takes between eight months and a year, depending on where and how they are trained, and for what purpose. Police dogs often regularly take training programs with their assigned handler to reinforce their training. In many countries, intentionally injuring or killing a police dog is a criminal offense.

== History ==
=== Early history ===
Dogs have been used in law enforcement since the Middle Ages. Wealth and money was then tithed in the villages for the upkeep of the parish constable's bloodhounds that were used for hunting down outlaws. The first recorded use of police dogs was in the early 14th century in St. Malo, France, where dogs were used to guard docks and piers. By the late 14th century, bloodhounds were used in Scotland, known as "Slough dogs" – the word "sleuth" (meaning "detective") was derived from this. Between the 12th and 20th centuries, police dogs on the British Isles and European continent were primarily used for their tracking abilities.

The rapid urbanization of England and France in the 19th century increased public concern regarding growing lawlessness. In London, the existing law enforcement, the Bow Street Runners, struggled to contain the crime on their own, and as a result, private associations were formed to help combat crime. Night watchmen were employed to guard premises, and were provided with firearms and dogs to protect themselves from criminals.

=== Modern era ===
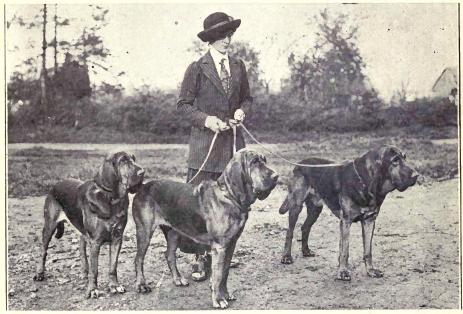
Bloodhounds used by Charles Warren to try to track down the serial killer Jack the Ripper in the 1880s.

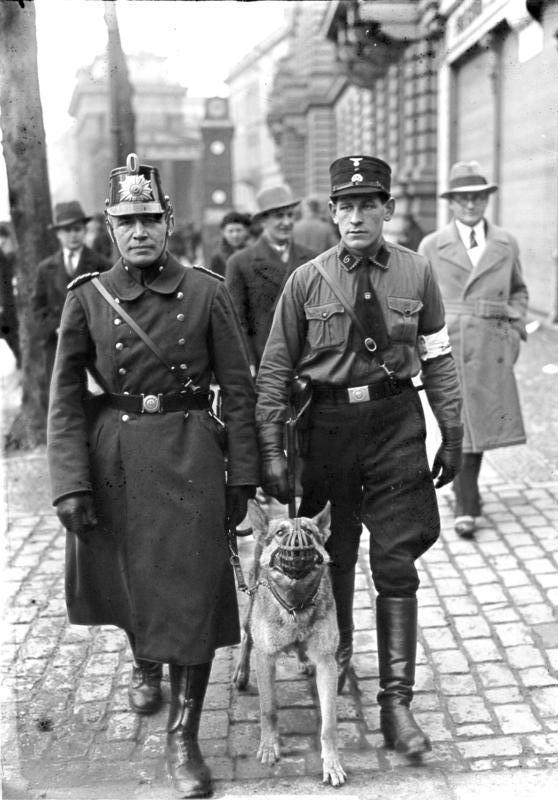
German shepherd in use by Schutzpolizei officer and SA auxiliary during the German federal election, March 1933, shortly after the Nazi seizure of power

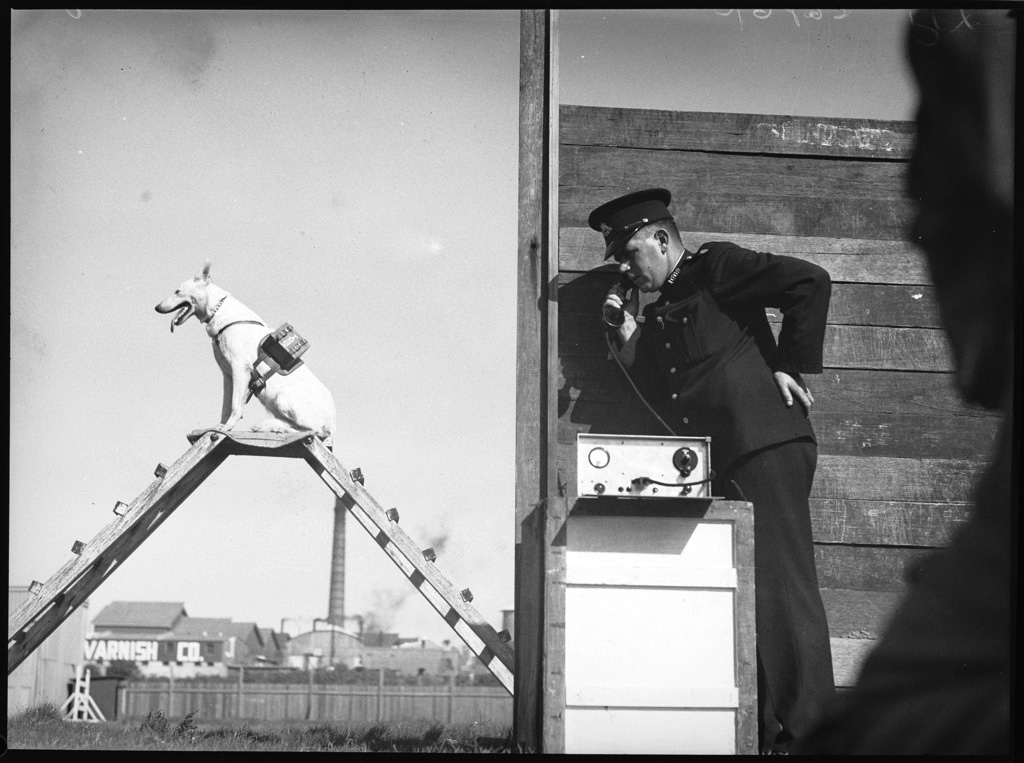
Police dog carries out orders communicated through a radio strapped to her back, Alexandria, Sydney, 1939

One of the first attempts to use dogs in policing was in 1889 by the Commissioner of the Metropolitan Police of London, Sir Charles Warren. Warren's repeated failures at identifying and apprehending the serial killer Jack the Ripper had earned him much vilification from the press, including being denounced for not using bloodhounds to track the killer. He soon had two bloodhounds trained for the performance of a simple tracking test from the scene of another of the killer's crimes. The results were far from satisfactory, with one of the hounds biting the Commissioner and both dogs later running off, requiring a police search to find them.

It was in Continental Europe that dogs were first used on a large scale. Police in Paris began using dogs against roaming criminal gangs at night, but it was the police department in Ghent, Belgium that introduced the first organized police dog service program in 1899. These methods soon spread to Austria-Hungary and Germany; in the latter the first scientific developments in the field took place with experiments in dog breeding and training. The German police selected the German Shepherd Dog as the ideal breed for police work and opened up the first dog training school in 1920 in Greenheide. In later years, many Belgian Malinois dogs were added to the unit. The dogs were systematically trained in obedience to their officers and tracking and attacking criminals.

In Britain, the North Eastern Railway Police were among the first to use police dogs in 1908 to put a stop to theft from the docks in Hull. By 1910, railway police forces were experimenting with other breeds such as Belgian Malinois, Labrador Retrievers, and German shepherds.

In 1910 Major Edwin Hautenville Richardson of the Sherwood Foresters wrote to every chief constable espousing the use of dogs for police work, after his having reviewed their use in the military, and in France and Germany as above. Resulting from this, Philip S Clay Chief constable of Nottingham City Police petitioned his Watch committee for £5.0.0d for a dog from Major Richardson, which was granted. On 26th October 1910 the dog arrived in the city, to assist officers patrolling at night, thus making the first territorial use of a specially-trained police dog in the UK.

== Training ==
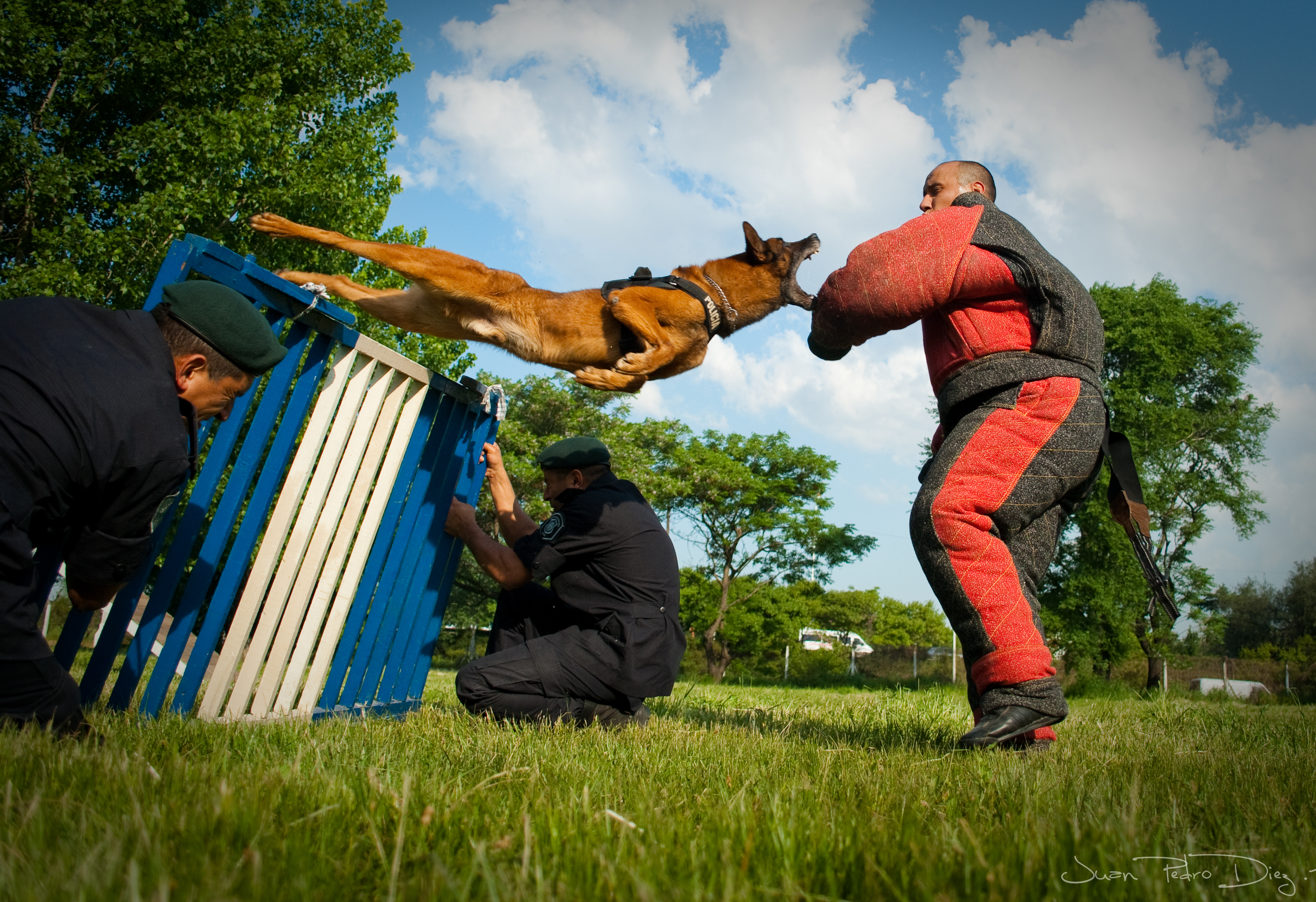
A Belgian Malinois being trained to attack

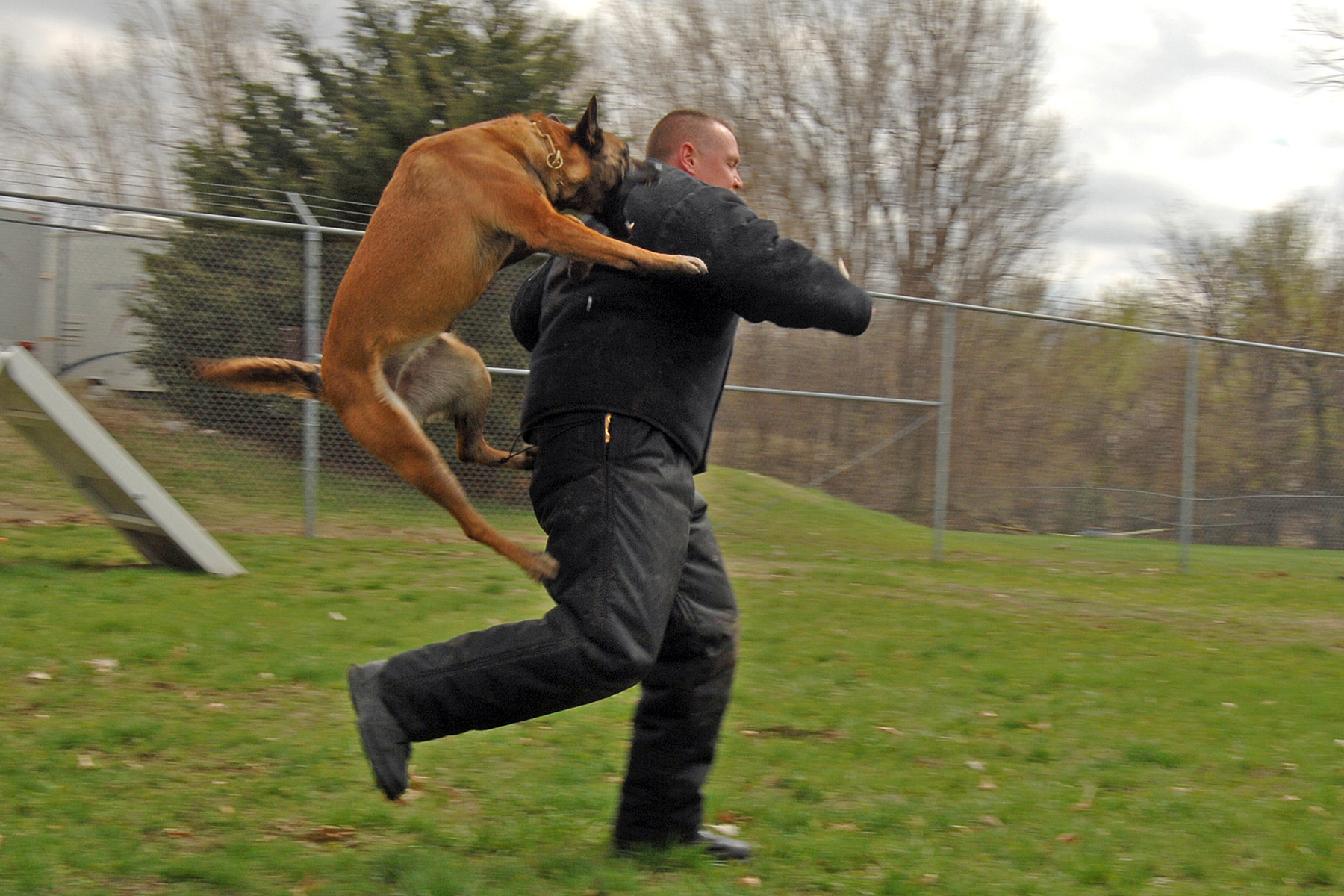
A military police dog training

Popular dog breeds used by law enforcement include the Airedale Terrier, Akita, Groenendael, Tervueren, Malinois dog, Bernese Mountain Dog, Bloodhound, Border Collie, Boxer, Bouvier des Flandres, Briard, Cane Corso, Bullmastiff, Croatian Sheepdog, Doberman Pinscher, German Shepherd, German Shorthaired Pointer, Golden Retriever, Labrador Retriever, Rottweiler, English Springer Spaniel and Dogo Argentino.

Training of police dogs is a lengthy process since it begins with the training of the canine handler. The canine handlers go through a long process of training to ensure that they will train the dog to the best of its ability. First, the canine handler has to complete the requisite police academy training and one to two years of patrol experience before becoming eligible to transfer to a specialty canine unit. This is because the experience as an officer allows prospective canine officers to gain valuable experience in law enforcement. However, having dog knowledge and training outside of the police academy is considered to be an asset, this could be dog obedience, crowd control, communicating effectively with animals and being approachable and personable since having a dog will draw attention from surrounding citizens.

For a dog to be considered for a police department, it must first pass a basic obedience training course. They must be able to obey the commands of their handler without hesitation. This allows the officer to have complete control over how much force the dog should use against a suspect. Dogs trained in Europe are usually given commands in the country's native language. Dogs are initially trained with this language for basic behavior, so, it is easier for the officer to learn new words/commands, rather than retraining the dog to new commands. This is contrary to the popular belief that police dogs are trained in a different language so that a suspect cannot command the dog against the officer.

Dogs used in law enforcement are trained to either be "single purpose" or "dual purpose". Single-purpose dogs are used primarily for backup, personal protection, and tracking. Dual-purpose dogs, however, are more typical. Dual-purpose dogs do everything that single-purpose dogs do, and also detect either explosives or narcotics. Dogs can only be trained for one or the other because the dog cannot communicate to the officer if it found explosives or narcotics. When a narcotics dog in the United States indicates to the officer that it found something, the officer has probable cause to search whatever the dog alerted on (i.e. bag or vehicle) without a warrant, in most states.

In suspect apprehension, having a loud barking dog is helpful and can result in suspects surrendering without delay.

== Specialization ==
Police dogs can be specialized to perform in specific areas.

- Apprehension and attack dogs – This dog is used to locate, apprehend, and sometimes subdue suspects.
- Detection dogs – Trained to detect explosives or drugs such as marijuana, heroin, cocaine, crack cocaine, or methamphetamines. Some dogs are specifically trained to detect firearms and ammunition.
- Dual purpose dog – Also known as a patrol dog, these dogs are trained and skilled in tracking, handler protection, off-leash obedience, criminal apprehension, and article, area and building search.
- Search and rescue dogs (SAR) – This dog is used to locate suspects or find missing people or objects. Belgian Malinois, German Shepherds, Golden Retrievers, Labrador Retrievers, and Bloodhounds can all be used.

== Retirement ==
Police dogs are retired if they become injured to an extent where they will not recover completely, pregnant or raising puppies, or are too old or sick to continue working. Since many dogs are raised in working environments for the first year of their life and retired before they become unable to perform, the working life of a dog is 6–9 years.

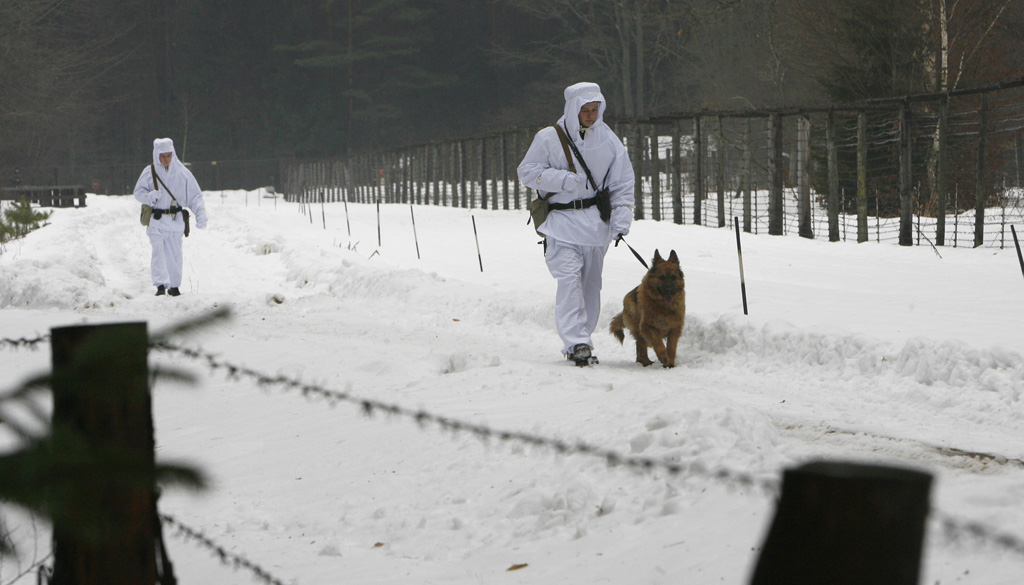
Belarusian Border Guards patrolling the Poland–Belarus border with working dog.

However, when police dogs retire in some countries they may have the chance to receive a pension plan for their contribution to policing. In 2013, a pension scheme for police dogs in Nottinghamshire, England was introduced, wherein the police force offered £805 over the span of three years to cover any additional medical costs; the dogs were also allowed to be adopted by their original handler.

In many countries, police dogs killed in the line of duty receive the same honors as their human partners.

== Accusations of brutality and racial partiality ==
A 2020 investigation coordinated by the Marshall Project found evidence of widespread deployment of police dogs in the U.S. as disproportionate force and disproportionately against people of color. A series of 13 linked reports found more than 150 cases from 2015 to 2020 of K-9 officers improperly using dogs as weapons to catch, bite, and injure people. The rate of police K-9 bites in Baton Rouge, Louisiana, a majority-Black city of 220,000 residents, averages more than double that of the next-ranked city, Indianapolis, and nearly one-third of the police dog bites are inflicted on teenage men, most of whom are Black. Medical researchers found that police dog attacks are "more like shark attacks than nips from a family pet" due to the aggressive training police dogs undergo. Many people bitten were not violent and were not suspected of crimes. Police officers are often shielded from liability, and federal civil rights laws don't typically cover bystanders who are bitten by mistake. Even when victims can bring cases, lawyers say they struggle because jurors tend to love police dogs.

== Notable police dogs ==
- Brewster (2004–2017), Britain's longest-serving police dog
- Diesel (2007/8–2015), Belgian Malinois, French tactical unit dog
- Finn (2009–2023), German Shepherd, British police dog
- Fu Zai, Corgi, Chinese police dog
- Hurricane (2009–2025), Belgian Malinois, United States Secret Service dog
- Inky, German Shepherd, fictional British police dog in the series Softly, Softly: Task Force
- Koton (d. 1991), German Shepherd, American police dog who later appeared in film
- Rajah (c. 1928–1942), German Shepherd, New Zealand unofficial police dog
- Sirius (d. 2001), Yellow Labrador, American police dog who died in the September 11 attacks
- Zanjeer (1992–2000), Labrador Retriever, Indian police dog
- Zuyaqui (d. 2000s), German Shepherd, Mexican drug detection dog

== See also ==
- Detection dog
- Dogs in warfare
- Nosework
- Working dog
- Dalmatian dog, typically associated with fire departments
