= Minuscule 96 =

- New Testament manuscript
- Text: Gospel of John †
- Date: 15th century
- Script: Greek
- Now at: Bodleian Library
- Size: 13.5 cm by 9.5 cm
- Category: none
- Hand: beautifully written
- Note: marginalia

Minuscule 96 (in the Gregory-Aland numbering), ε 514 (von Soden), is a Greek minuscule manuscript of the New Testament, on paper leaves. Palaeographically it has been assigned to the 15th century. It has marginalia.

== Description ==
The codex contains the text of the Gospel of John on 62 leaves (size 13.5 cm by 9.5 cm) with one lacuna (18:18-34). The text is written in one columns per page, 18 lines per page. It is beautifully written. The text is divided according to the κεφαλαια (chapters), whose numbers are given at the margin (in Latin).

It does not contain the Pericope Adulterae (John 7:53-8:11).

Kurt Aland did not place the text of the codex in any Category.

== History ==
The manuscript was beautifully written by Johannes Trithemius († 1516), abbot of Sponheim. Then it belonged to Jan Cornarius († Jena 1558) Achates Cornarius († Kreuznach 1573). In 1607 it was received from Abraham Scultetus by George Hackwell, for the Oxford University library.

It was examined by Ussher (for Walton), Mill (as Trit.), Griesbach (only chapters 3–4), and Tischendorf. It was used in Walton's Polyglott (Trit). C. R. Gregory saw it in 1883.

It is currently housed at the Bodleian Library (MS. Auct. D. 2. 17), at Oxford.

== See also ==
- List of New Testament minuscules
- Biblical manuscript
- Textual criticism
- Minuscule 96abs
