= Prow Mountain =

Mountain in Alberta, Canada

- Location within Alberta

Highest point
- Elevation: 2,858 m (9,377 ft)
- Prominence: 164 m (538 ft)
- Listing: Mountains of Alberta
- Coordinates: 51°38′21″N 115°53′34″W

Geography
- Country: Canada
- Province: Alberta
- Parent range: Vermilion Range
- Topo map: NTS 82O12 Barrier Mountain

Climbing
- First ascent: 1918 Morrison P. Bridgland

Prow Mountain is a mountain located in the Vermilion Range in Alberta. It is so named because it was said to resemble the Prow of a ship.

== See also ==
- Geography of Alberta
