= Cascade Mountain (Alberta) =

Mountain in Alberta, Canada

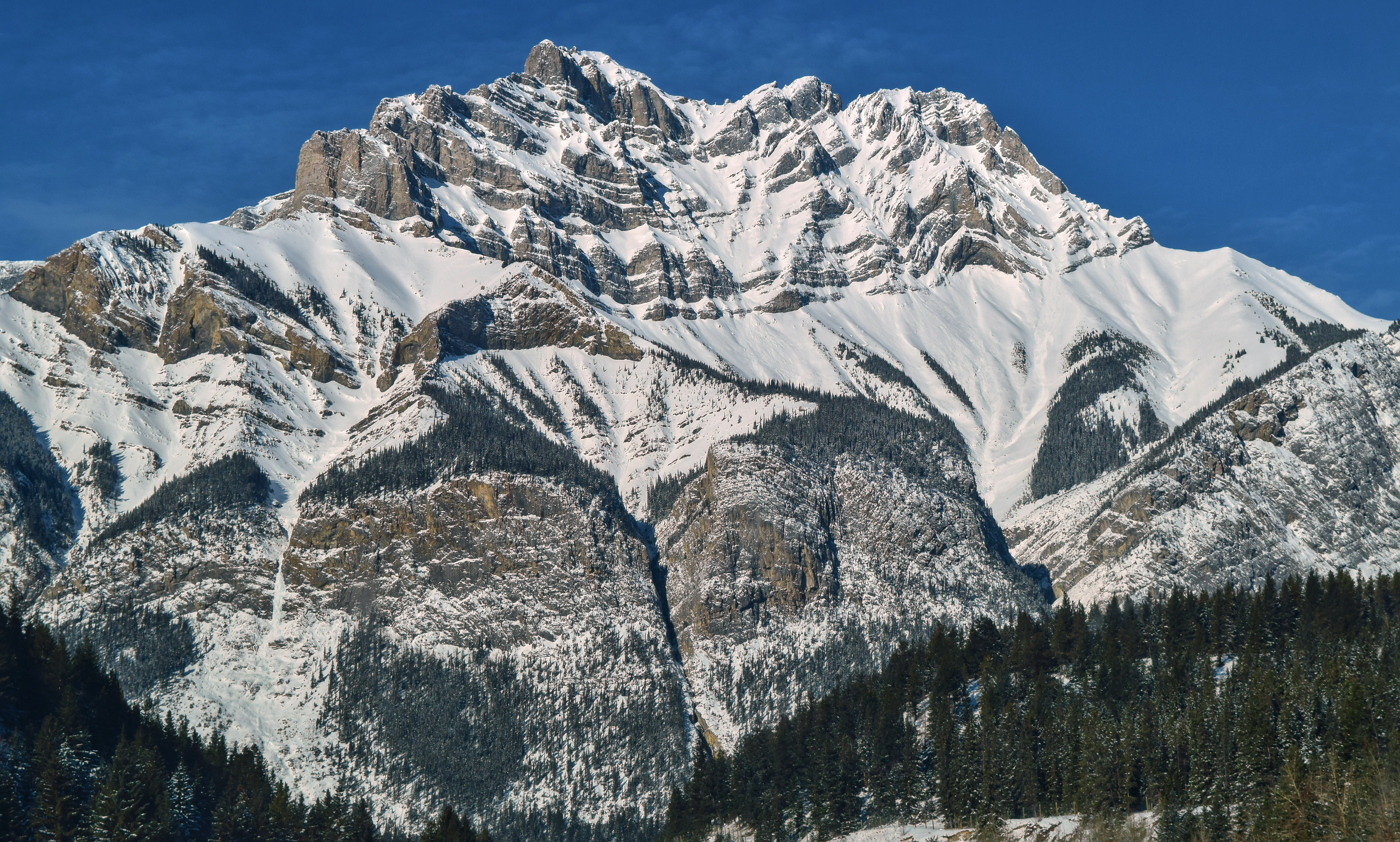
- Cascade Mountain viewed from the south

Highest point
- Elevation: 2,998 m (9,836 ft)
- Prominence: 938 m (3,077 ft)
- Listing: Mountains of Alberta
- Coordinates: 51°16′05″N 115°34′56″W

Naming
- Native name: Mînî hrpa (Stoney); nipika-pakitik (Cree)

Geography
- Location within Alberta
- Location: Alberta, Canada
- Parent range: Vermillion Range
- Topo map: NTS 82O4 Banff

Climbing
- First ascent: 1887 by Tom Wilson
- Easiest route: Scramble

Cascade Mountain is a mountain located in the Bow River Valley of Banff National Park, adjacent to the town of Banff. The mountain was named in 1858 by James Hector after the waterfall or cascade on the southern flanks of the peak. The mountain has also been called Stoney Chief, which is related to the name of the smaller neighbouring mountain Stoney Squaw, which is still in use. Cascade is the highest mountain adjacent to the townsite.

== Climbing routes ==
The mountain can be climbed starting from the Norquay Ski Area base. The first portion is a fairly moderate hike, up to the Cascade Amphitheatre. Continuing upwards, the route ascends along the ridge edge until it reaches the crest where it dips before it rises to the false summit. While the false summit can be descended at its end, it is much easier to follow a trail around the western side along the exposed foot. Snow typically blocks this route almost until mid July and attempting it while snowy can entail considerable avalanche risk due to the slabby terrain and exposure. A long window of clear weather - full day - should be anticipated before attempting this climb, as many climbers have gotten into trouble and needed rescue (or died) when a storm suddenly blows in. The ascent normally takes 3 to 6 hours, while the descent along the same path takes 2 to 4 hours.

Looking at Cascade Mountain from Banff avenue, the ridge on the right (above the old Buffalo paddock) is the SW ridge. It was first climbed in 1977 by the late Jean Pierre Cadot and René Boisselle. In early 1900, MacCarthy (first ascent of Mt Logan in Yukon) mentioned that Cascade Mt seems to offer good rock on the SW ridge. The route starts between the two obvious buttress and gains the crest of the ridge after a few rope pitches. The upper and very steep buttress is climbed via a chimney on the left side. The entire route is 5.6 or 5.7 grade III.

== Gallery ==
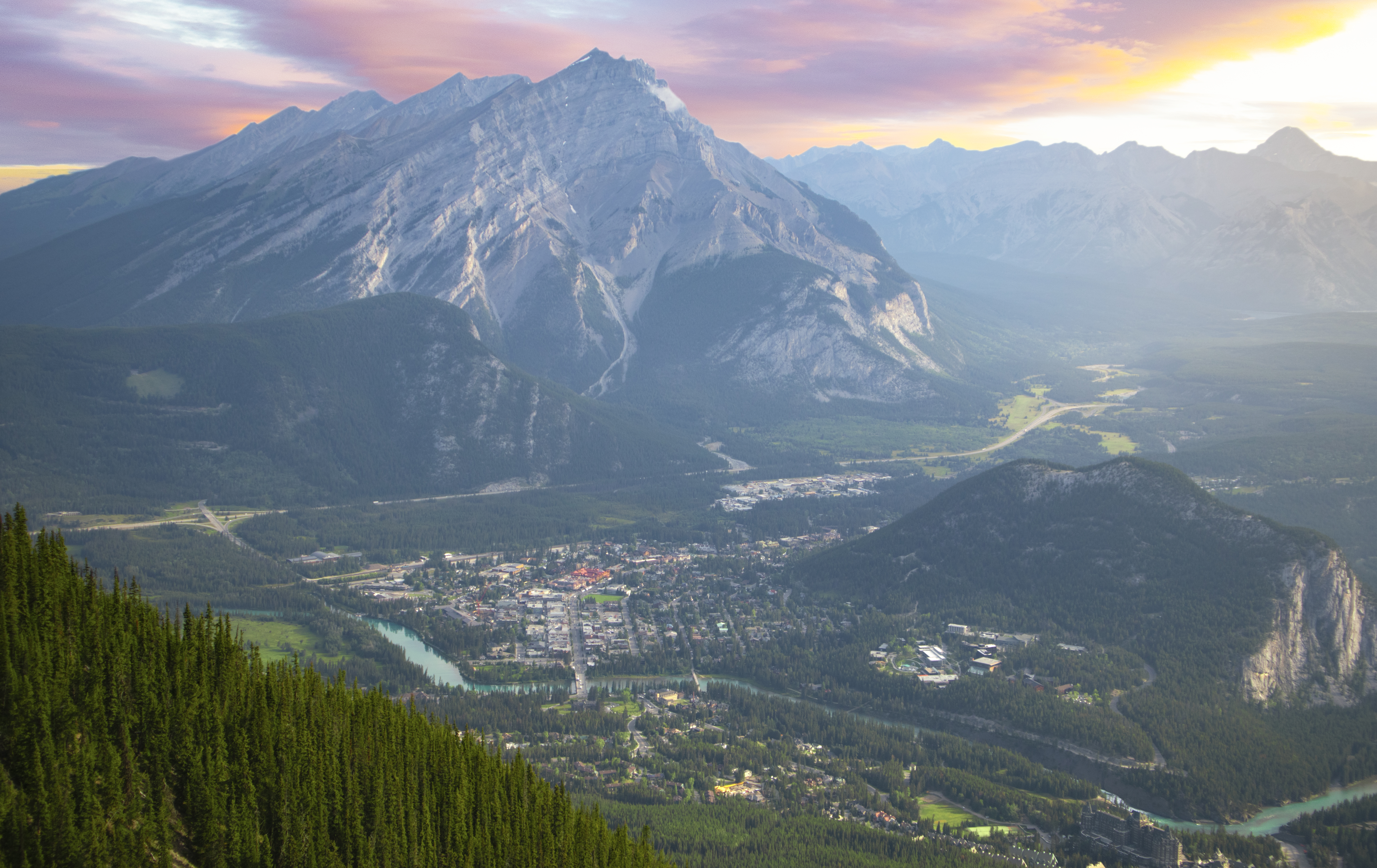
Cascade Mountain and the town of Banff

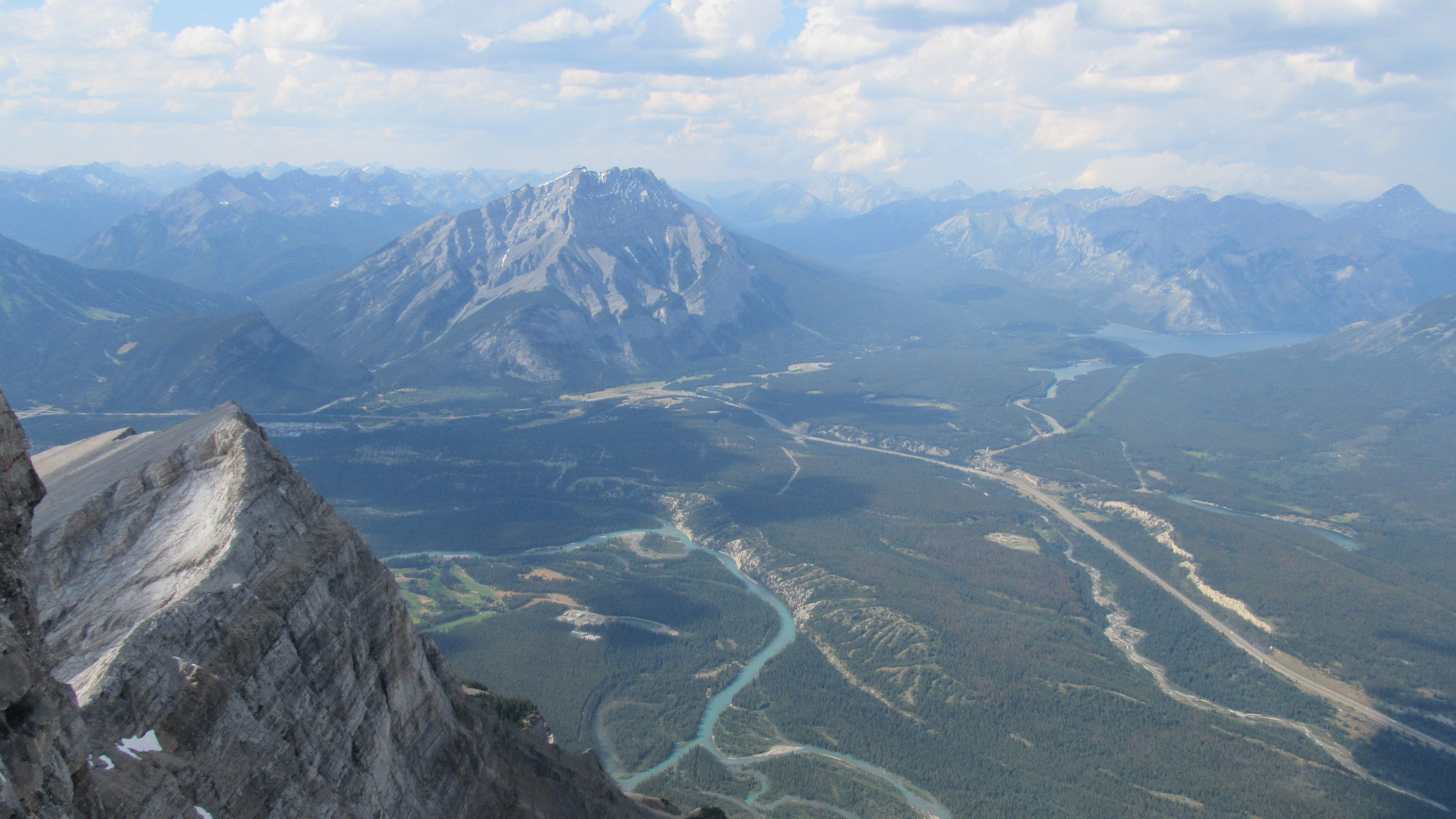
Cascade Mountain as seen from Mount Rundle Summit
