= Flints Peak =

Mountain in Banff NP, Canada

- Location within Alberta

Highest point
- Elevation: 2,950 m (9,680 ft)
- Prominence: 170 m (560 ft)
- Parent peak: Cuthead Peak 2960 m
- Listing: Mountains of Alberta
- Coordinates: 51°26′22″N 115°45′38″W

Geography
- Country: Canada
- Province: Alberta
- Protected area: Banff National Park
- Parent range: Vermilion Range
- Topo map: NTS 85O5 Pollock Lake

Flints Peak was named in 1959 for a local landowner but given its possessive form to avoid any inference of it having a geological origin. It is located in the Vermilion Range in Banff National Park, Alberta.
