= Brewster (police dog) =

British police dog (2004–2017)

- Species: Dog
- Breed: English Springer Spaniel
- Sex: Male
- Born: 2004
- Died: 2017 (aged 12–13)
- Occupation: Illicit-substance detection dog
- Employer: Bedfordshire, Cambridgeshire & Hertfordshire Police Dog Unit
- Years active: 11
- Owner: PC Dave Pert

Brewster (2004–2017) was Britain's longest serving police dog. He was an English Springer Spaniel, handled by PC Dave Pert working for the Bedfordshire, Cambridgeshire and Hertfordshire Police Dog Unit.

== See also ==
- List of individual dogs
