= Angell–Brewster House =

Historic house in Oregon, United States

- Formerly listed on the U.S. National Register of Historic Places
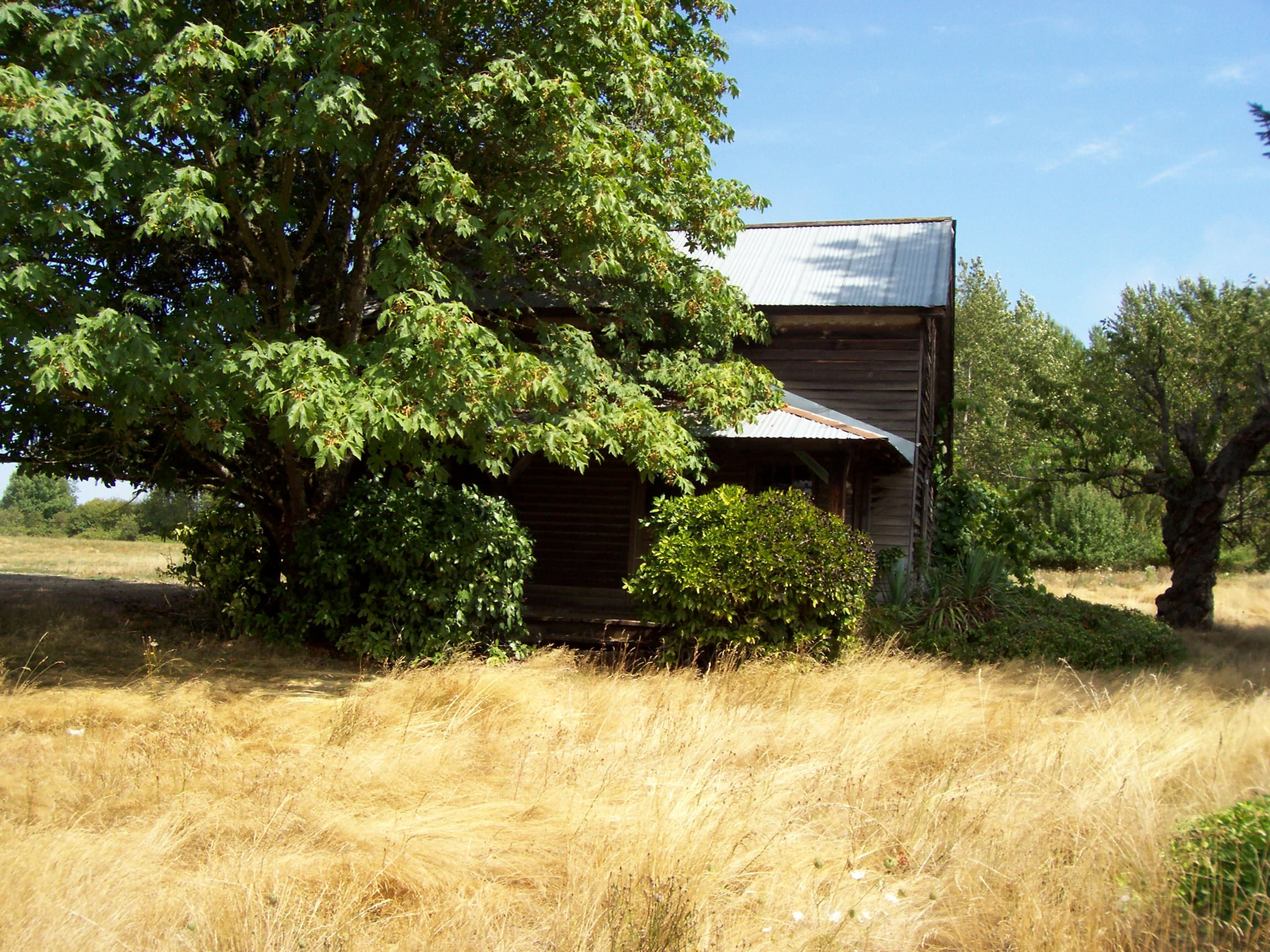

- Location within Oregon Location within the United States
- Nearest city: Lebanon, Oregon
- Coordinates: 44°34′46″N 122°52′12″W
- Area: 1 acre (0.40 ha)
- Built: 1855
- Architect: Angell, Thomas
- Architectural style: Mid 19th Century Revival
- NRHP reference No.: 92001330

Significant dates
- Added to NRHP: October 08, 1992
- Removed from NRHP: April 20, 2011

The Angell–Brewster House in Lebanon, Oregon, is a building from 1855. It was listed on the National Register of Historic Places in 1992. It was removed from the register on April 20, 2011, after being demolished in 2010.
