= Brewster (unit) =

Non-sI unit used to measure the susceptibility of a material to photoelasticity

The brewster (B) is a non-SI unit used to measure the susceptibility of a material to photoelasticity, or the value of the stress-optic coefficient of the material. The unit has dimensions reciprocal to those of stress. One brewster is defined to be equal to $10^{-12}$ square metres per newton (m^{2}/N or 1/Pa) or $10^{-13}$ square centimetres per dyne (cm^{2}/dyn). The unit is named after David Brewster, who discovered stress-induced birefringence in 1816.
