= Vermilion Range (Alberta) =

Subrange of the Front and Park Ranges in Alberta, Canada

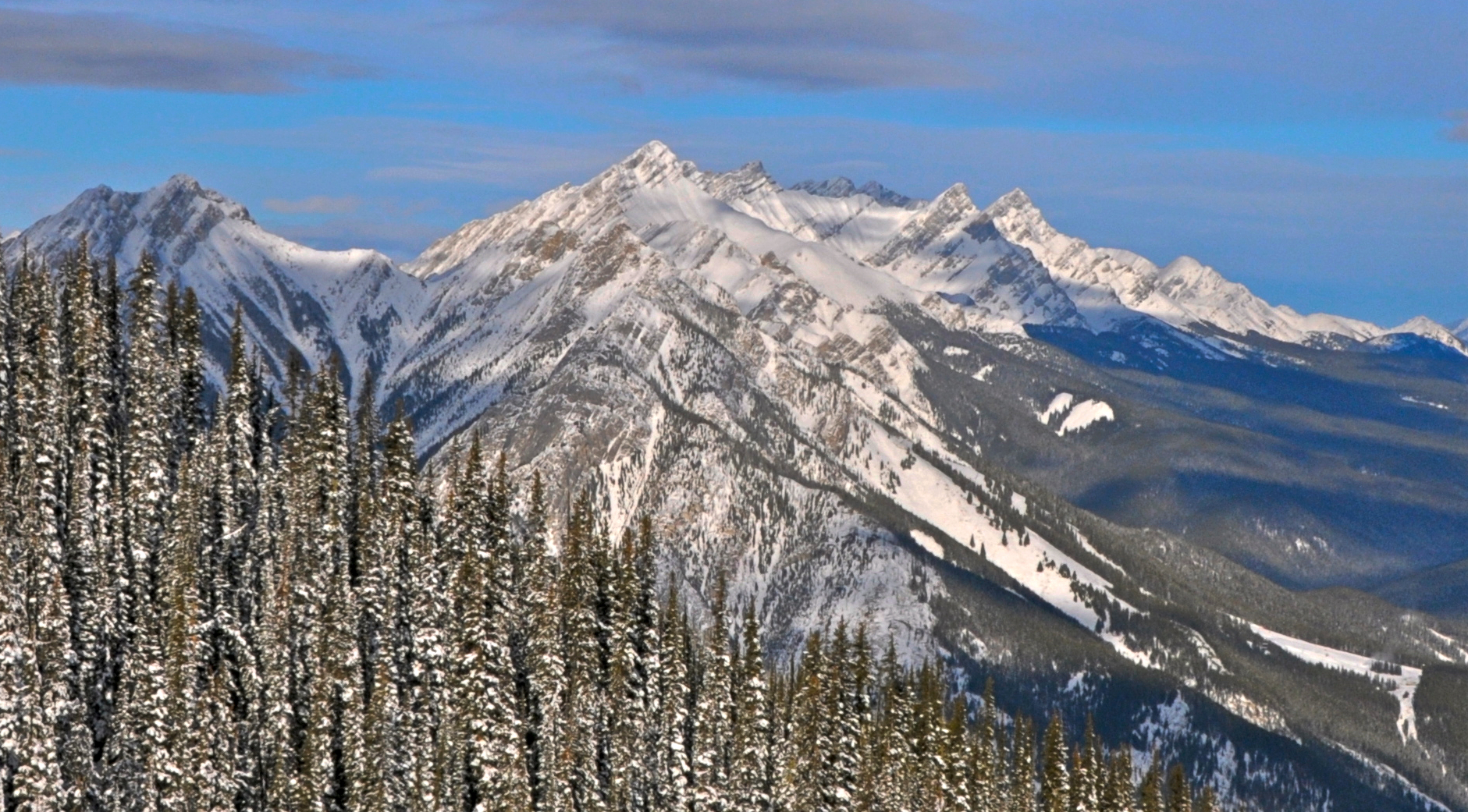
- Mount Brewster as seen from Sulphur Mountain in 2010

Highest point
- Peak: Cascade Mountain
- Elevation: 2,998 m (9,836 ft)
- Listing: Mountains of Alberta
- Coordinates: 51°16′05″N 115°34′56″W

Dimensions
- Length: 56 km (35 mi) N-S
- Width: 35 km (22 mi) E-W
- Area: 551 km^{2} (213 mi^{2})

Geography
- Location within Alberta
- Country: Canada
- Province: Alberta
- Protected area: Banff National Park
- Range coordinates: 51°22′N 115°43′W
- Parent range: Canadian Rockies
- Borders on: Sawback Range; Bare Range; Palliser Range; Fairholme Range
- Topo map: NTS 82O5 Castle Mountain

The Vermilion Range is a mountain range of the Canadian Rockies, in Banff National Park, Canada. The range is east of the Sawback Range and west of the Bare and Palliser Ranges.

This range includes the following mountains and peaks:

| Name | Elevation | |
| Name | m | ft |
|---|---|---|
| Cascade Mountain | 2,998 | 9,836 |
| Flints Peak | 2,950 | 9,680 |
| Mount Brewster | 2,859 | 9,380 |
| Prow Mountain | 2,858 | 9,377 |
| Mount Norquay | 2,522 | 8,274 |

== Geology ==
The mountains in Banff Park are composed of sedimentary rock laid down during the Precambrian to Jurassic periods. Formed in shallow seas, this sedimentary rock was pushed east and over the top of younger rock during the Laramide orogeny.

== Climate ==
Based on the Köppen climate classification, the range experiences a subarctic climate with cold, snowy winters, and mild summers. Temperatures in winter can drop below −20 °C (−4 °F) with wind chill factors below −30 °C (−22 °F).

== See also ==
- Ranges of the Canadian Rockies
- Geography of Alberta
