= Brewster (given name) =

Brewster is a masculine given name which may refer to:

== People ==
- Brewster Higley (1823–1911), American otolaryngologist who wrote the poem that became the original lyrics of "Home on the Range"
- Brewster Jennings (1898–1968), American business executive
- Brewster Kahle (born 1960), American computer technologist
- Brewster Mason (1922–1987), English actor, primarily on the stage
- Brewster Morris (1909–1990), American diplomat, ambassador to Chad
- Brewster H. Shaw (born 1945), American astronaut
- M. Brewster Smith (1919–2012), American psychologist and president of the American Psychological Association

== Fictional characters ==
- The protagonist of Brewster McCloud, a 1970 film
- The title character of Brewster Rockit: Space Guy!, a comic strip
- Brewster the Guru, a minor character on The Muppet Show, an American children's TV series
- Brewster, one of the protagonists on Chuggington, a British animated TV series
