= Brewster Body Shield =

Prototype World War I body armor

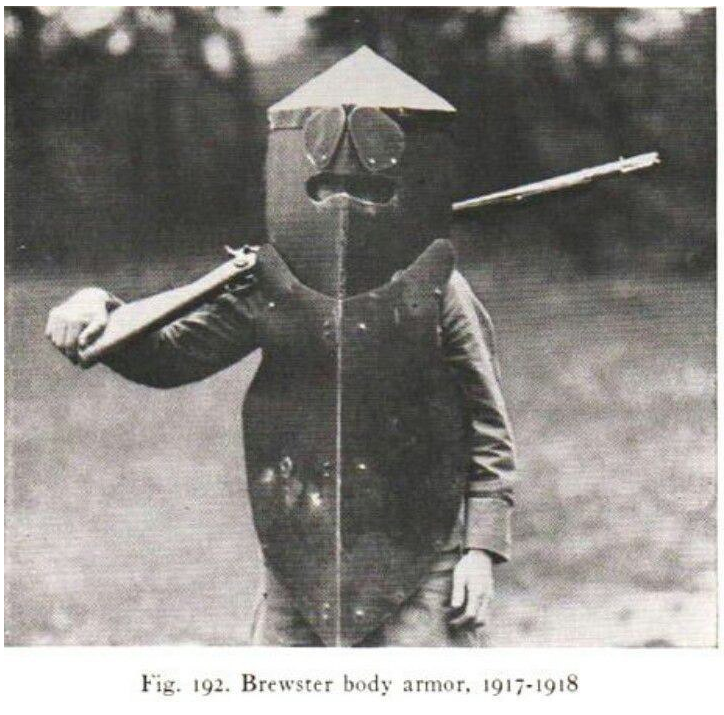
Brewster Body Shield

The Brewster Body Shield or Brewster Body Armor was the first heavy body armor developed for the United States Army in World War I, designed by Guy Otis Brewster from Dover, New Jersey.

During World War I, the United States developed several types of body armor, including the chrome nickel steel Brewster Body Shield, which consisted of a breastplate and a headpiece and could withstand .303 British bullets at 2,700 ft/s (820 m/s), but was heavy and cumbersome at 40 lb (18 kg). A scaled waistcoat of overlapping steel scales fixed to a leather lining was also designed; this armor weighed 11 lb (5.0 kg), fit close to the body, and was considered more comfortable.

== Reference in film ==
An example of this armor appears in a scene of the 1970 Italian movie Many Wars Ago, although it is mistakenly described as Farina armor.
