= Brewster Bulldogs =

- City: Brewster, New York
- League: Federal Hockey League
- Founded: 2015
- Home arena: Brewster Ice Arena
- Owners: Bruce Bennett; Ed Crowe
- Head coach: David Lun
- Website: Bulldogs FHL

Franchise history
- 2015–2016: Brewster Bulldogs

The Brewster Bulldogs were a minor league professional ice hockey team in the Federal Hockey League playing in Brewster, New York. The team played in the 2015–16 FHL season.

== History ==
On April 3, 2015, the Danbury Ice Arena announced that it did not want to renew its contract with the Danbury Whalers and gave them a notice to evict by April 17, leaving the team homeless.

On June 13, 2015, it was announced that due to the eviction of the Whalers, a new team called the Stateline Whalers would play the 2015–16 season at the Brewster Ice Arena under former Danbury Whalers CEO and managing partner Herm Sorcher. The team was announced as being owned by Barry Soskin, who also owns the Port Huron Prowlers and Danville Dashers and formerly the Dayton Demonz. The Danbury Whalers were officially considered to be on hiatus for the season by the FHL, but gave up their naming and territorial rights to the new Brewster team.

On June 27, it was reported that the FHL had approved of a new team in Danbury, Connecticut, to replace the now departed Whalers. Local businessmen Bruce Bennett and Edward Crowe were announced as the ownership group. Bennett announced the new team as the Danbury Titans. On July 15, during the Titans' inaugural booster club meeting, the ownership confirmed that the league had re-organized and they would also own the new Brewster team (which had formerly announced as the Stateline Whalers and signed a lease for the Brewster Ice Arena) and Barry Soskin would no longer be involved in Brewster. On July 18, Bennett announced the team would be called the Brewster Bulldogs and that neither of his teams (the Bulldogs and Titans) would have any connection with the former Whalers.

The team failed to make the playoffs in the six-team league after the 2015–16 regular season. In June 2016 after their inaugural season ended, owner Bruce Bennett announced that he had given up operating the team to focus on managing the Danbury Titans. The team officially ceased operation on July 14, 2016.
