= Brewster High School =

Brewster High School may refer to several schools in the United States:

- Brewster High School (New York)
- Brewster High School (Washington)
- Brewster High School (Kansas), Brewster, Kansas
- Brewster Catholic High School, Tampa, Florida

Brewster High School may also refer to:

- Brewster Academy, Wolfeboro, New Hampshire
