= Royal Brewster House =

Historic house in Maine, United States

- U.S. National Register of Historic Places
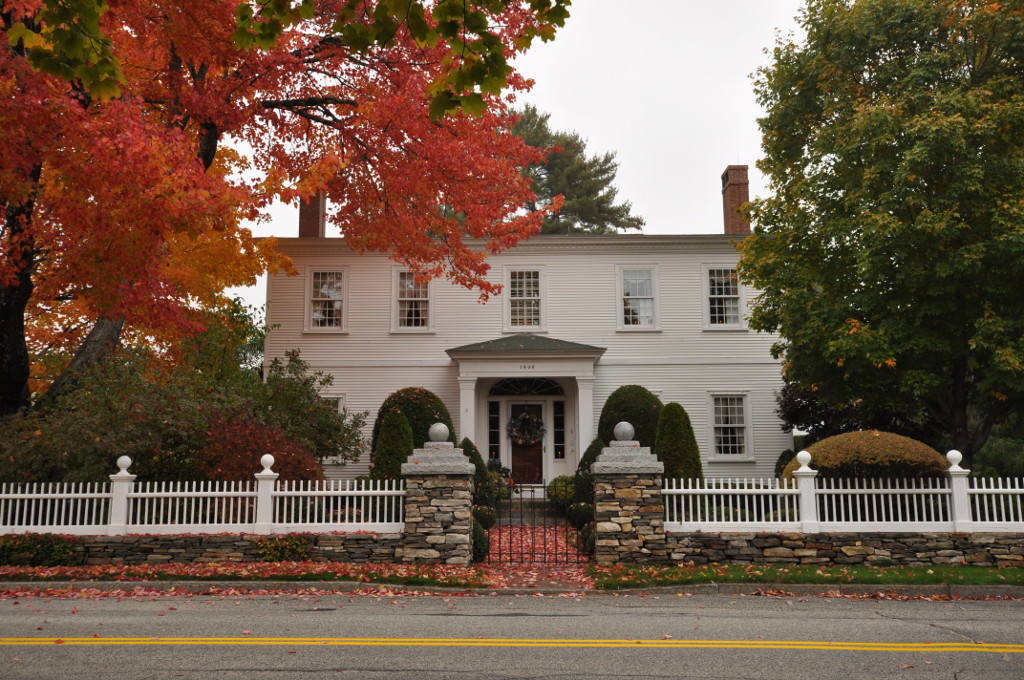

- Location within Maine Location within the United States
- Location: Brewster Lane, Buxton Lower Corner, Buxton, Maine
- Coordinates: 43°36′22″N 70°32′9″W
- Area: 1 acre (0.40 ha)
- Built: 1805
- Built by: Woodman, Capt. Joseph
- Architectural style: Federal
- NRHP reference No.: 75000116
- Added to NRHP: June 5, 1975

The Royal Brewster House is a historic house on Brewster Lane in the Buxton Lower Corner village of Buxton, Maine, United States. Built in 1805, it is an imposing Federal style house in a relatively rural setting. It was built for Dr. Royal Brewster, the town physician for about 40 years, and was the home for many years of Brewster's brother John, a well-known deaf-mute itinerant painter of folk portraiture. The house was listed on the National Register of Historic Places in 1975.

== Description and history ==
The Brewster House is set on the north side of Brewster Lane, a short road that forms a triangular island with Maine State Route 112 and United States Route 202. It is a two-story wood-frame structure, five bays wide, with a low-pitch hip roof, clapboard siding, and a granite foundation. The main facade has a center entry, which is flanked by sidelight windows and topped by a recessed arch. This is sheltered by a Greek Revival portico, with square columns at the front and pilasters at the rear. The cornice features fine Federal style decorative carving. To the rear of the house a two-story ell extends, joining the main house to a carriage house and barn. The house interior features restrained Federal period woodwork throughout, and a parlor decorated with French wallpaper in 1859.

The house was built in 1805 by Joseph Woodman, a prominent local builder and businessman. It was built for Dr. Royal Brewster, who had married a Buxton native in 1795 and settled there. Brewster served as the town doctor for about forty years, and provided space in the home for his brother John. John was born a deaf-mute, and was educated despite the handicap, and made a career for himself as an itinerant painter of portraits. He traveled widely practicing his art, and his work is highly regarded.

== See also ==
- National Register of Historic Places listings in York County, Maine
