= Mount Brewster (Canada) =

Mountain in Banff, Alberta, Canada

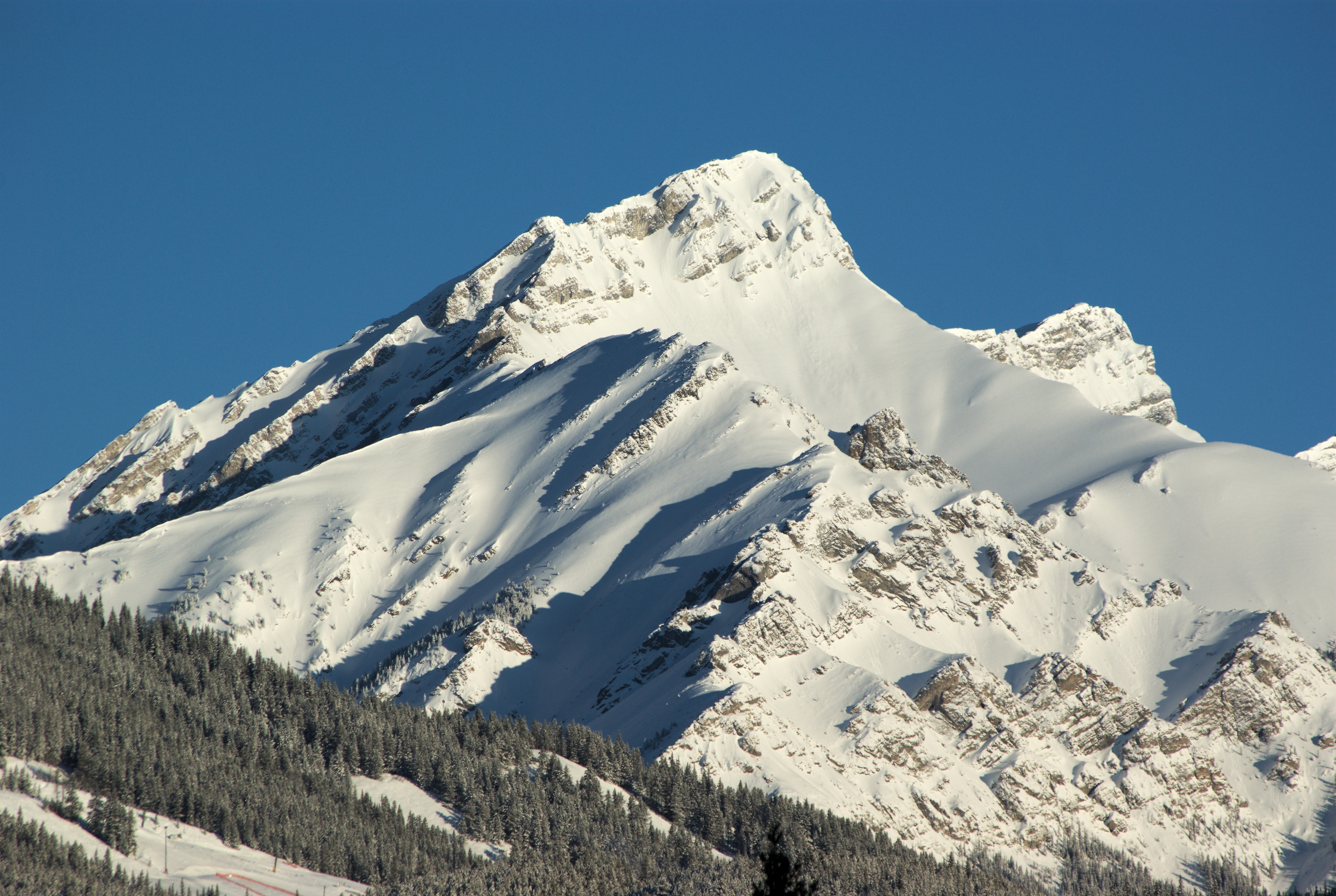
- Mount Brewster seen from Banff

Highest point
- Elevation: 2,859 m (9,380 ft)
- Prominence: 116 m (381 ft)
- Parent peak: Blue Elk Peak (2972 )
- Listing: Mountains of Alberta
- Coordinates: 51°14′43″N 115°39′20″W

Geography
- Location within Alberta
- Location: Alberta, Canada
- Parent range: Vermilion Range
- Topo map: NTS 82O4 Banff

Climbing
- First ascent: 1926 H. W. Greenham, D. Pilley

Mount Brewster is a 2,859-metre (9,380 ft) mountain summit located in the Vermilion Range of Banff National Park, in the Canadian Rockies of Alberta, Canada. Mount Brewster was named in 1929 by Tom Wilson after John Brewster who was the father of the Brewster family of Banff.

== Geology ==
The mountains in Banff Park are composed of sedimentary rock laid down during the Precambrian to Jurassic periods. Formed in shallow seas, this sedimentary rock was pushed east and over the top of younger rock during the Laramide orogeny.

== Climate ==
Based on the Köppen climate classification, the mountain experiences a subarctic climate with cold, snowy winters, and mild summers. Temperatures can drop below -20 °C with wind chill factors below -30 °C in the winter.

== Gallery ==
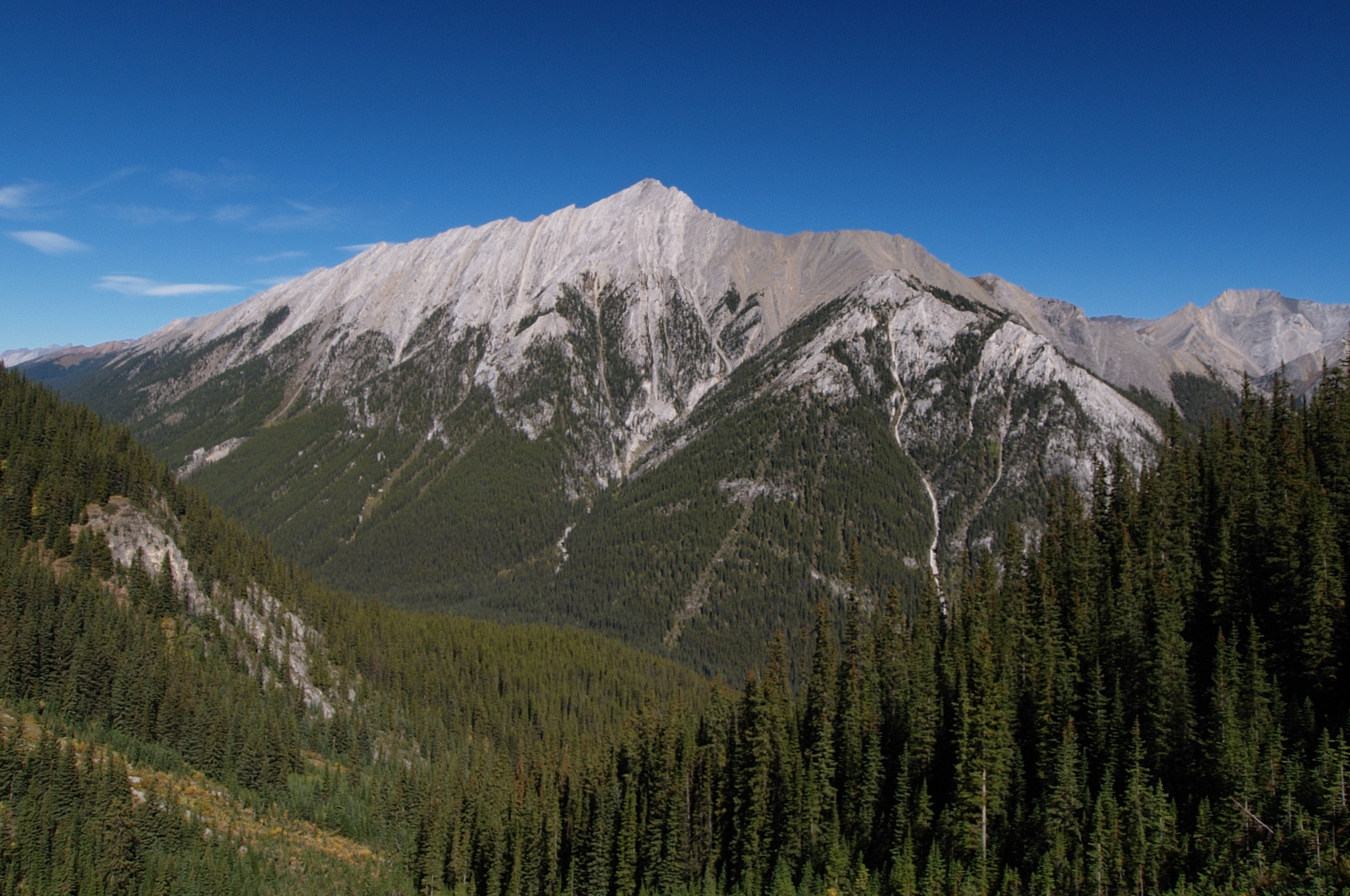
Mount Brewster

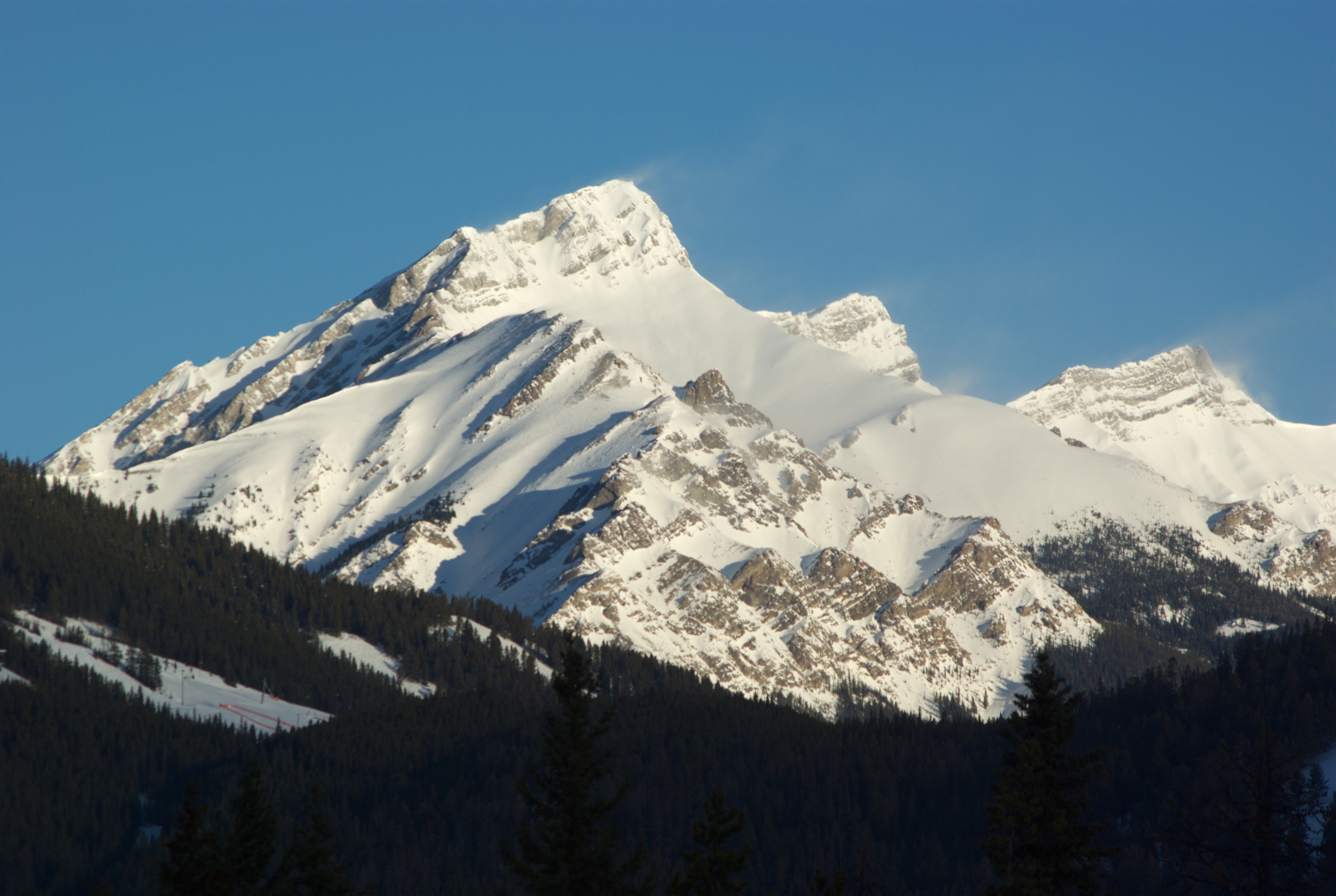
Mount Brewster seen from Banff

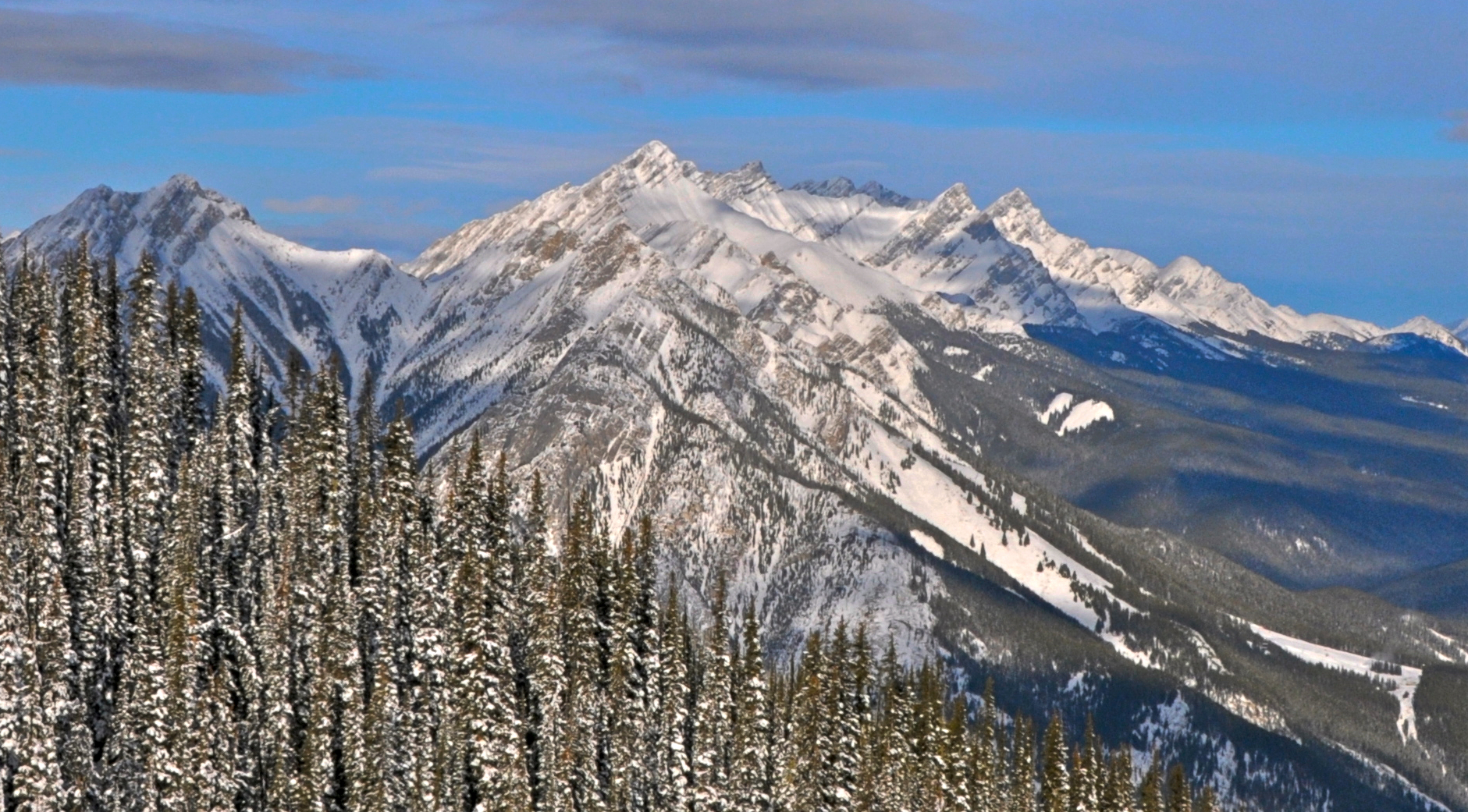
Mount Brewster is the high point, centered

== See also ==
- Geography of Alberta
