= Koton (dog) =

German Shepherd police dog and actor

Koton (identified in other sources as "Kondo" or "K9 Star") (died 1991) was a German Shepherd police dog who was one of the Dog performers to played Jerry Lee in the 1989 movie K-9 with James Belushi. Prior to being in the movie, Koton worked for the Kansas City Police Department as a K-9 officer. During his policing career he was responsible for over 24 felony arrests and in October 1991 located 10 kilograms of cocaine worth more than US$1.2 million. On November 18, 1991, Koton was fatally shot while trying to apprehend a suspect in the murder of a police officer. The Officer Down Memorial Page, which documents American law enforcement officers (including police dogs) who have died in the line of duty, identifies this dog by the name "K9 Star" rather than "Koton," and asserts that he appeared in the movie before his career with the police department.

Although a trained K-9 officer was one of the dogs featured in the movie, he was not the most prominent; a feature in People magazine identifies the principal dog actor as a West German dog named "Rando." A lengthy Los Angeles Times article from 1988 confirms that Rando was the primary canine performer, although noting that he was assisted by "three stand-ins." Various online articles and trivia sections—for example, a 2017 WhatCulture list about animal celebrities—appear to conflate Rando with one or more of the other dogs who appeared in the film, including Koton, apparently resulting in some biographical confusion.

== Filmography ==
- K-9 (1989)

== See also ==
- List of individual dogs
