= Exshaw =

- Hamlet
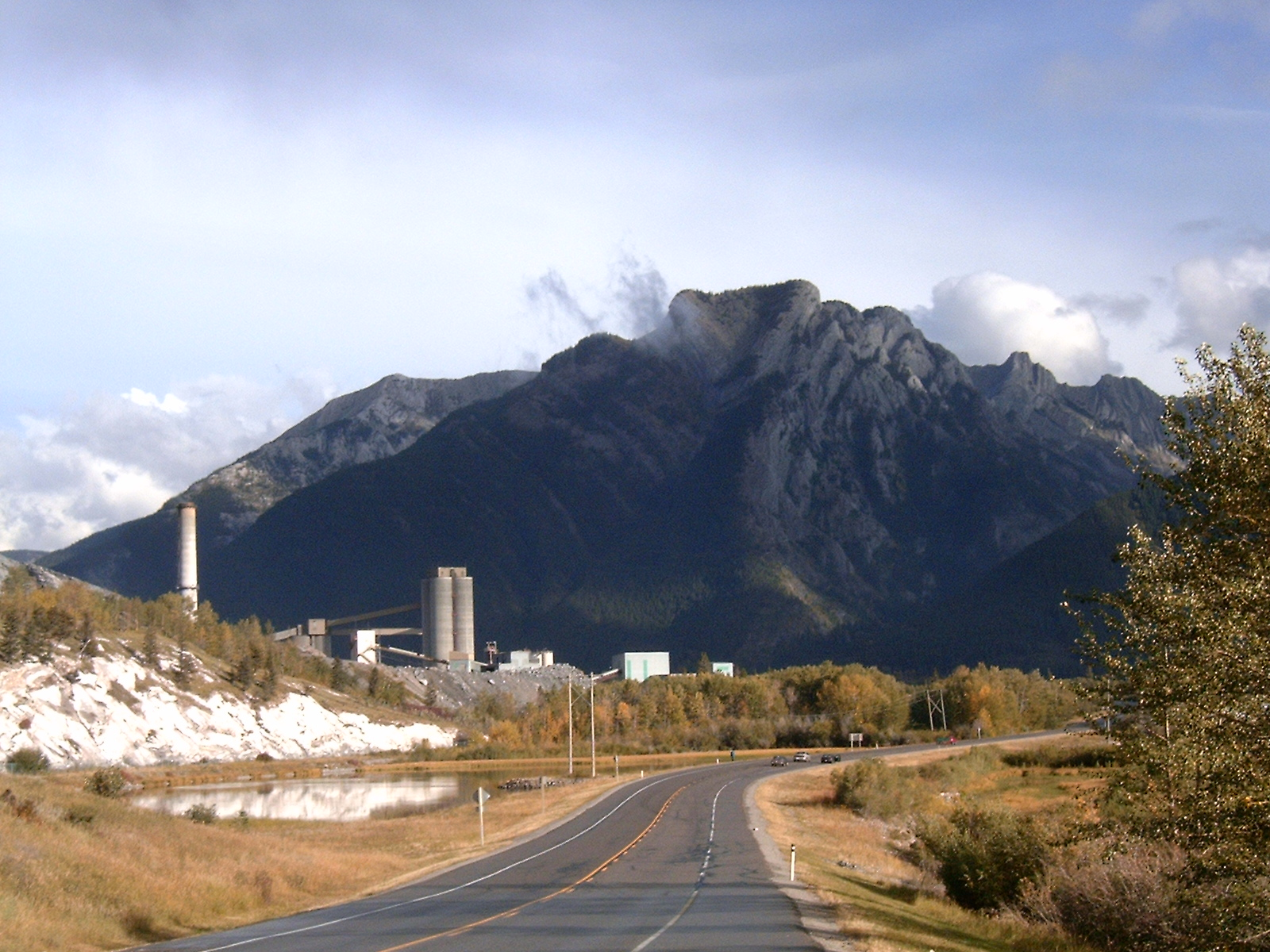
- Heart Mountain and the Cement Plant at Exshaw. Community is east (left) of the plant.

- Location of Exshaw in Alberta
- Coordinates: 51.0617°N 115.1628°W
- Country: Canada
- Province: Alberta
- Region: Alberta's Rockies
- Census division: 15
- Municipal district: M.D. of Bighorn No. 8

Government
  - Type: unincorporated
  - Governing body: M.D. of Bighorn No. 8 Council

Area (2021)
  - Land: 1.55 km^{2} (0.60 sq mi)

Population (2021)
  - Total: 449
  - Density: 289.3/km^{2} (749/sq mi)
- Time zone: UTC−06:00 (Alberta Time)
- Area codes: 403, 587, 825

Exshaw is a hamlet in Alberta, Canada, within Municipal District (MD) of Bighorn No. 8. Located approximately 90 kilometres (56 mi) west of downtown Calgary and 15 kilometres (9.3 mi) east of Canmore, Exshaw is situated within the Bow River valley north of the Bow River.

The hamlet was once located within Rocky Mountains Park later Banff National Park, with the original park entrance being only a couple miles east of Exshaw.

== History ==
Sir Sanford Fleming named Exshaw after his son-in-law, E. William Exshaw (15 February 1866, Bordeaux – 16 March 1927; of Anglo-Irish descent; and sailing Olympic gold medalist at the Paris 1900 Summer Olympics), who with Fleming helped establish the Western Canada Cement and Coal Company. William Exshaw visited in 1908 when a banquet was held in his honour by the staff of WCC&C.

Robert D. Hassan, an American mechanical engineer, was hired in 1906 to build a mill in Exshaw, Alberta for the Western Canada Cement and Coal Company. He was assisted in building the plant by Alexander Graham Christie. In 1911, the plant was acquired by the Canada Cement Company.

Although the original cement plant was further west, the community has had a large plant for many years.

In the 1970s, a portion of Exshaw was demolished – 47 homes, a church, and a school – to make way for expansion of the cement plant.

== Geography ==
East of Exshaw are smaller company town communities of Kananaskis (lime plant), which is not the recreational area of the same name, and Seebe (power dam), which is now closed but proposed for future residential redevelopment. A small ranch area, now mainly dude ranches, is also near the hamlet. Of note is the Brewster's Kananaskis Ranch & Golf Course, which sits on the original homestead property of Bud Brewster and has remained in the family's possession since the 1880s.

A number of smaller parks with camping facilities have also developed in the east Bow Valley. Directly across the Bow River south from Exshaw is the Hamlet of Lac des Arcs although no bridge connects the two hamlets.

A dam on the Bow River is east of Seebe.

The smaller Exshaw Mountain, 1,783 metres (5,850 feet), is north of the hamlet, and is locally known as Cougar Mountain. Across from the community south beyond Lac des Arcs is Heart Mountain is easier to scale. This mountain is sometimes used as a wedding venue because of the heart shape.

Exshaw Creek, locally known and identified on the Highway 1A bridge as Canyon Creek, runs through the hamlet. In 1958, Alan McGugan et al., identified a new species of the pelecypod Megalodon in a river cliff of Exshaw Creek and gave the new specific name M. banffensis, for the proximity of the Banff area.

The eastern portion of the hamlet is on the flood plain for Jura Creek. In 1937, P.S. Warren described outcrops on the banks of Jura Creek, naming these the Exshaw Formation. The Jura Creek valley is known to provide a good introduction to some Front Range geology, with the exposed formations including the Palliser (Devonian), Exshaw and Banff (Mississippian). The naming of Jura Creek was from misidentified Jurassic fossils, which are actually Paleozoic, not Jurassic.

Grotto Creek, 3 km west, has pictographs, including a possible "fluteplayer" Kokopelli image that may be from the Flute Clan of the Hopi tradition.

The local area is known for wildlife, despite the industrial development. Duncan MacGillivray, with explorer David Thompson on his survey of the Canadian Rockies, first encountered a bighorn sheep, near Exshaw, on 30 November 1800, which led to the specimens collected and subsequent scientific naming. Mount MacGillivray, to the west of Heart Mountain, is his namesake.

== Demographics ==
Population history of Exshaw
| Year | Pop. | ±% |
|---|---|---|
| 1941 | 308 | — |
| 1951 | 538 | +74.7% |
| 1956 | 608 | +13.0% |
| 1961 | 678 | +11.5% |
| 1966 | 587 | −13.4% |
| 1971 | 548 | −6.6% |
| 1976 | 389 | −29.0% |
| 1981 | 353 | −9.3% |
| 1986 | 348 | −1.4% |
| 1991 | 383 | +10.1% |
| 1991A | 386 | +0.8% |
| 1996 | 374 | −3.1% |
| 2001 | 231 | −38.2% |
| 2006 | 382 | +65.4% |
| 2011 | 362 | −5.2% |
| 2016 | 412 | +13.8% |
| 2021 | 449 | +9.0% |
Source: Statistics Canada

In the 2021 Census of Population conducted by Statistics Canada, Exshaw had a population of 449 living in 170 of its 185 total private dwellings, a change of 9% from its 2016 population of 412. With a land area of 1.55 km^{2} (0.60 sq mi), it had a population density of 289.7/km^{2} (750.3/sq mi) in 2021.

As a designated place in the 2016 Census of Population conducted by Statistics Canada, Exshaw had a population of 412 living in 164 of its 178 total private dwellings, a change of 13.8% from its 2011 population of 362. With a land area of 1.58 km^{2} (0.61 sq mi), it had a population density of 260.8/km^{2} (675.4/sq mi) in 2016.

== Economy ==
The cement plant, now owned by Lafarge North America, is the main industry in the community. The limestone is quarried on the mountain north of the plant.

A number of other plants and quarries are in the area east and west, such as Baymag's magnesium oxide calcination plant, with technology that minimizes energy consumption, and Graymont Inc's lime and limestone products plant.

Baymag had its 40th anniversary in 2022; it had one year earlier reached a milestone of 150,000 metric tonnes per annum capacity.

== Administration ==
Exshaw is the largest hamlet in the M.D. of Bighorn No. 8, which also includes the hamlets of Benchlands, Dead Man's Flats, Harvie Heights and Lac des Arcs, as well as rural ranchland west of Cochrane. The M.D. of Bighorn No. 8's municipal office is located in Exshaw.

== Notable people ==
Bruno Gerussi - actor

== See also ==
- List of communities in Alberta
- List of designated places in Alberta
- List of hamlets in Alberta
