= Castle Junction =

Castle Junction: Castle Mountain; Eisenhower Junction (1946–1979)
- Locality
- Location within Alberta
- Coordinates: 51°16′7″N 115°55′9″W
- Country: Canada
- Province: Alberta
- Region: Alberta's Rockies
- Census division: 15
- Municipal district: Improvement District No. 9 (Banff National Park)

Government
  - Type: Unincorporated
  - Governing body: Improvement District No. 9 Council
- Time zone: UTC−06:00 (Alberta Time)
- Area codes: +1-403, +1-587
- Highways: Hwy 1 (TCH), Hwy 1A, Hwy 93

Castle Junction is a locality where the northern extent of the Banff–Windermere Highway (Highway 93) intersects with the Trans-Canada Highway (Highway 1), the Bow River, and Bow Valley Parkway (Highway 1A) in Banff National Park, Alberta. It is named after the nearby Castle Mountain, clearly visible from the junction. The area is also referred to as Castle Mountain; however, the official location is approximately 1.6 km (1.0 mi) southwest of Castle Junction along the Canadian Pacific Railway.

Work started here in 1910 on the Auto Route of the Great Divide, a project to build a highway across the Rocky Mountains, when construction began on a road from Castle Junction to Banff. Following an interruption caused by World War I, construction wrapped up in 1923 when the newly constructed road between Calgary and Banff was joined to the Windermere Highway via the road between Castle Junction and Banff.

Prime Minister Mackenzie King changed the name of Castle Mountain to Mount Eisenhower in 1946 to honour the World War II general Dwight D. Eisenhower. Correspondingly, Castle Junction was called Eisenhower Junction. Castle Mountain was officially restored to its original name in 1979, at which time Eisenhower Junction was also renamed Castle Junction.

A group of lodges and the Castle Mountain campground are within a kilometre of the junction. Several hiking trails are available in the vicinity. The trailhead for hikes to Silverton Falls and Rockbound Lake is approximately 200 metres east of Castle Junction. The remains of Silver City, a 19th-century settlement founded by prospectors at the base of Castle Mountain, are nearby. Also nearby is the site of the Castle Mountain Internment Camp used during World War I.
