= Alberta Highway 68 =

Highway in Alberta, Canada

Highway 68
- Sibbald Creek Trail
- Highway 68 highlighted in red

Route information
- Maintained by the Ministry of Transportation and Economic Corridors
- Length: 37.2 km (23.1 mi)

Major junctions
- West end: Highway 40 near Seebe
- East end: Highway 1 (TCH) near Mînî Thnî

Location
- Country: Canada
- Province: Alberta
- Specialized and rural municipalities: Kananaskis I.D., Bighorn No. 8 M.D., Rocky View County

Highway system
- Alberta Numbered Highway Network; List; Former
← Highway 66	→ Highway 72

Alberta Provincial Highway No. 68, commonly referred to as Highway 68 and officially named Sibbald Creek Trail, is a highway in central Alberta, Canada, west of Calgary. In the west, Highway 68 begins at its intersection with Highway 40 and ends at Highway 1 (Trans-Canada Highway) approximately 17 km (11 mi) west of Highway 22 (Cowboy Trail). The road is paved for the final 11.5 km (7.1 mi) to Highway 1. All other sections are gravel. It provides access to hiking, horseback riding and hunting areas, Sibbald Lake Campground, private ranching operations and gas fields in the area. Through travellers can use it as an alternative route to Kananaskis Country.

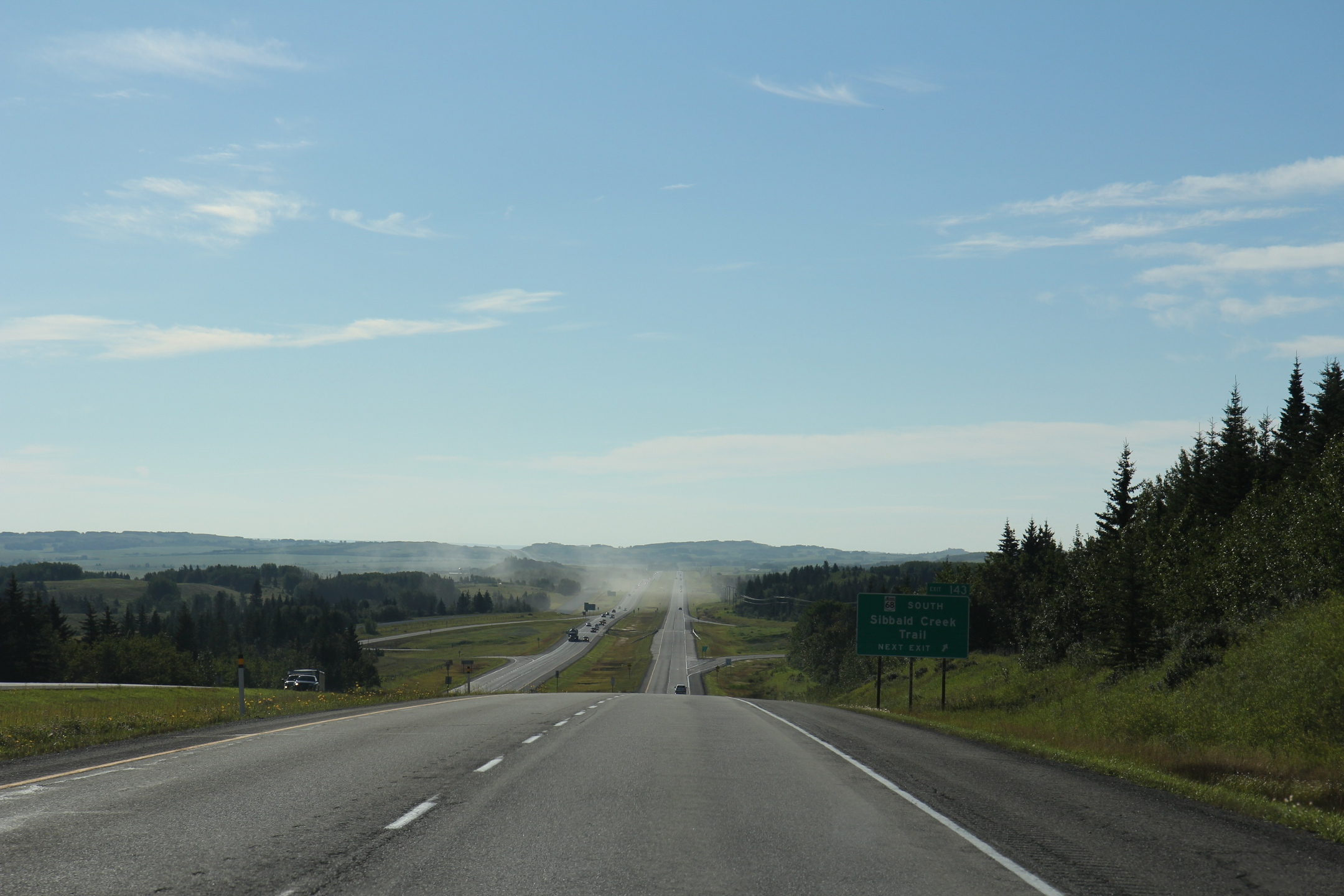
Northern terminus of Alberta Highway 68 at the TransCanada Highway

== Major intersections ==
From west to east:

Location	km	mi	Destinations	Notes
Kananaskis I.D. (Kananaskis Country)	0.0	0.0	Highway 40 – Kananaskis Village, Longview, Trans Canada Highway	
Rocky View County	37.2	23.1	Highway 1 (TCH) – Banff, Calgary	Interchange; Highway 1 exit 143
1.000 mi = 1.609 km; 1.000 km = 0.621 mi
