= Seebe, Alberta =

Seebe
- Designated place
- Location of Seebe Seebe (Alberta)
- Coordinates: 51°05′47″N 115°03′25″W
- Country: Canada
- Province: Alberta
- Region: Alberta's Rockies
- Census division: 15
- Municipal district: Municipal District of Bighorn No. 8

Government
  - Type: Unincorporated
  - Governing body: Municipal District of Bighorn No. 8 Council

Area
  - Land: 0.03 km^{2} (0.012 sq mi)

Population (2016)
  - Total: 0
- Time zone: UTC−06:00 (Alberta Time)
- Area codes: 403, 587, 825

Seebe /ˈsiːbiː/ is a former hamlet and ghost town in Alberta, Canada, within the Municipal District of Bighorn No. 8. It is a former Calgary Power Company Ltd. employee townsite that was closed on August 31, 2004.

The name Seebe comes from the Cree word for river.

== History ==
With a growing population in Calgary, and electricity becoming a standard form of power, the Calgary Power Company Ltd. was formed in the early 20th century. In 1911, a hydro-electric dam was built at Horseshoe Falls. In 1929, another hydro plant and dam were built at the Kananaskis Falls. This dam is now on Highway 1X, which connects the Trans-Canada Highway (Highway 1) with Highway 1A (the former alignment of the Trans-Canada Highway).

As Calgary grew, the Calgary Power Company Ltd. grew, with hydro dams being developed up and down the Bow River. Seebe became the technical hub, remotely controlling water flow from the Spray, Ghost, Kananaskis, Lake Minnewanka, Brazeau, North Saskatchewan, and other watersheds, so that power could be produced efficiently. The control centre also could bring on more power from the coal-fired plants in the Wabamun area, west of Edmonton. The control centre at Seebe also once was the operations hub, while the head office was in Calgary.

Seebe consisted of the company store and post office next to the Kananaskis plant. There were several residences close by. There were also two residences at the Horseshoe plant. But the larger concentration of housing was about 1 kilometre (0.62 mi) downstream from the Kananaskis plant, and about 2 kilometres (1.2 mi) upstream from the Horseshoe plant.

As the community and area grew, a one-room school was opened in 1918. The Seebe School was the last operating one-room school in Alberta, closing in 1996. Students from the local dude ranches, forestry, government and others also attended the school.

An area of about 300 acres (1.2 km^{2}) encompassing the former townsite and dams was leased by Calgary Power from the Stoney Tribe, a member of the Treaty Seven Nations. They are now known by their own name, Nakoda. The lease area is bound by the Kananaskis River to the west, the Canadian Pacific rail line to the south, the Bow River to the north and a north–south about 1 kilometre (0.62 mi) downstream from the Horseshoe plant to the east. The lease was used as common area for recreation, horse pasture, bird watching, fishing, camping and other purposes.

=== World War II ===
Camp 130, a prisoner-of-war camp in the Second World War, was located in Seebe.

"The Kananaskis Prisoner Of War camp (No. 130), also known as Seebe for the nearby hamlet, operated from 29 September 1939 to 28 January 1946. Locals referred to this facility as Camp "Kan-A-Nazi". Seebe was small with a capacity of 200 prisoners of war (POWs)."

=== Recent history ===
Scenes from the movie Open Range, starring and directed by Kevin Costner, were filmed on the Stoney First Nations reserve directly across the Bow River from Seebe in 2003 when it was still an inhabited hamlet. At that time, Seebe still had a small general store, a café and a post office all in one small building. The AltaEnergy employee housing and one dormitory was further down the road but considered private property. It was closed down a couple of years later and many of the houses were sold and moved.

In 2006/2007, a proposal emerged to redevelop the townsite as a new community, retaining the same name, with an approximately population of 5,600 people at full build-out.

An ecological and environmental research station of the University of Calgary is located nearby, on Highway 40 at Barrier Lake.

== Geography ==
Seebe is located on the south side of the Bow River, adjacent to the Seebe Dam. It is 0.5 kilometres (0.31 mi) east of Highway 1X, 2 kilometres (1.2 mi) north of the Trans-Canada Highway (Highway 1) and 2 kilometres (1.2 mi) south of Highway 1A.

Seebe is just downstream from the confluence of the Bow and Kananaskis rivers at Kananakis Falls. Horseshoe Falls is 3 kilometres (1.9 mi) downstream. Seebe has great vistas of the face of Yamnuska Mountain to the north, Pigeon Mountain and the Kananaskis Valley to the south, Loder Peak and the Bow Valley to the west, and opening onto the prairie grasslands and the Bow Valley to the east.

The underlying substrate in the area is sedimentary interbedded shale, sandstone and limestone. At the surface, there are areas of glacial till with very little topsoil, drumlins, and small pockets of fertile alluvial deposits. The interbedded bedrock is tilted, being part of the disturbed zone adjacent to the Rockies, thus, the falls on the Bow River, and the potential for hydroelectric power generation.

== Demographics ==
Population history of Seebe
Year	Pop.	±%
1941	126	—
1951	147	+16.7%
1956	120	−18.4%
1961	137	+14.2%
1966	116	−15.3%
1971	108	−6.9%
1976	136	+25.9%
1981	104	−23.5%
1986	134	+28.8%
1991	80	−40.3%
1996	2	−97.5%
2001	78	+3800.0%
2006	0	−100.0%
2011	0	0.00%
2016	0	0.00%
Source: Statistics Canada

As a designated place in the 2016 Census of Population conducted by Statistics Canada, Seebe recorded a population of 0 living in 0 of its 0 total private dwellings, no change from its 2011 population of 0. With a land area of 0.03 km^{2} (0.012 sq mi), it had a population density of 0.0/km^{2} (0.0/sq mi) in 2016.

As a designated place in the 2011 Census, Seebe had a population of 0 living in 0 of its 0 total dwellings, a 0% change from its 2006 population of 0. With a land area of 0.06 km^{2} (0.023 sq mi), it had a population density of 0/km^{2} (0/sq mi) in 2011.

== See also ==
- List of communities in Alberta
