= T. J. Lanning =

American alpine ski racer and coach (1984–2026)

Thomas "TJ" Lanning (August 27, 1984 – July 2, 2026) was an American alpine ski racer and coach for the United States Ski Team. Known for his aggressive, high-speed style, Lanning competed primarily in downhill, super-G, and combined events. Despite a career frequently interrupted by severe injuries, he secured a national title and multiple top-10 World Cup finishes before transitioning into coaching.

Born in Helena, Montana, Lanning stood out early as a top junior talent, competing in the 2001 and 2002 FIS Junior World Ski Championships. He transitioned to senior international competition later in the decade, representing the United States at the 2007 FIS Alpine World Ski Championships in Åre, Sweden.

== Career ==
2008 United States Downhill Champion: Captured the national title in his signature discipline.

World Cup Finals Qualification: Qualified for the World Cup Finals during the 2008–09 season, finishing the year ranked 25th in downhill and 33rd in super-G.

Top World Cup Finishes: Scored points nine times for the U.S. team, highlighted by three top-10 placements:

- 9th place: Downhill – Lake Louise, Canada (November 29, 2008)
- 10th place: Super Combined – Beaver Creek, USA (2007)
- 10th place: Downhill – Val Gardena, Italy (December 20, 2008)

In November 28, 2009, during a World Cup downhill race at Lake Louise, he suffered a catastrophic high-speed crash near the timing flats. The crash resulted in a dislocated left knee and a fractured C5 vertebra in his neck, effectively forcing his retirement from competitive ski racing.

== Retirement and death ==
Following his retirement from competition, Lanning remained active in the alpine skiing community. He transitioned into a coaching role with the U.S. Ski Team, where he used his firsthand speed-skiing experience and resilience to mentor the next generation of American racers.

Lanning died in Park City, Utah on July 2, 2026, at the age of 41.
