= Alberta Highway 1A =

Designation for two disconnected sections of provincial highway in Alberta, Canada

Highway 1A
- Highway 1A highlighted in red

Route information
- Auxiliary route of Highway 1
- Maintained by Parks Canada, Alberta Transportation, City of Calgary

Bow Valley Parkway
- Length: 50.3 km (31.3 mi)
- West end: Highway 1 (TCH) at Lake Louise
- Major intersections: Highway 93 at Castle Junction
- East end: Highway 1 (TCH) west of Banff

Bow Valley Trail
- Length: 92.0 km (57.2 mi)
- West end: Highway 1 (TCH) in Canmore
- Major intersections: Highway 1X near Exshaw; Highway 40 near Ghost Lake; Highway 22 in Cochrane
- East end: Highway 1 in Calgary

Location
- Country: Canada
- Province: Alberta
- Specialized and rural municipalities: I.D. No. 9, M.D. of Bighorn No. 8, Rocky View County
- Major cities: Calgary
- Towns: Canmore, Cochrane
- Villages: Lake Louise

Highway system
- Alberta Numbered Highway Network; List; Former
← Highway 1	→ Highway 1X

Highway 1A is the designation of two alternate routes off the Alberta portion of Trans-Canada Highway 1. However, it is not the only name used for spurs off Highway 1 - Highway 1X is another such designation. Despite these highways being suffixed routes of Highway 1, they are not part of the Trans-Canada Highway network, and are signed with Alberta's provincial primary highway shields instead of the Trans-Canada shields used for Highway 1.

== Bow Valley Parkway ==
The Lake Louise to Banff section of the Banff National Park 1A route is also known as the Bow Valley Parkway. It begins at Highway 1 at Lake Louise, generally paralleling it until it meets Highway 1 again approximately 6 km (3.7 mi) west of Banff. It provides more immediate access to attractions in Banff National Park such as Castle Mountain and Johnston Canyon. This spur has a reduced speed limit of 60 km/h (37 mph), and provides opportunities to view wildlife at various times of the year.

Parks Canada introduced planned and marked pullovers along the route to enhance and educate visitors about the region. The Bow Valley Parkway is one of only two parkways between Lake Louise and Banff, and the only one that allows views of the mountain scenery, waterfalls, and various view points of the nearby rivers and creeks. It was the original highway that connected the valley and is advertised as a "year-round scenic heritage experience".

Parks Canada enacted seasonal travel restrictions along the Bow Valley Parkway on a 17 km (11 mi) segment between the Johnston Canyon Campground and the Fireside Picnic Area (adjacent to the Highway 1 eastern junction). From March 1 to June 25, travel is not permitted between 8 p.m. and 8 a.m. in order to protect wildlife. Highway 1 can be used as an alternate route.

In 2022, Parks Canada announced a three-year pilot project that would see the 17-km eastern portion of the Parkway, between the eastern junction with the Trans-Canada Highway and Johnson Canyon, closed to all vehicular traffic, except for bicycles, between March 1 and June 25, and from Sept. 1 to 30.

=== Major intersections ===
Starting from the west end of Highway 1A. The entire route is in I.D. No. 9 (Banff National Park).

Location	km	mi	Destinations	Notes
Lake Louise	0.0	0.0	Lake Louise Drive Highway 1 (TCH) / Highway 93 – Banff, Radium Hot Springs, Jasper, Field	Interchange; continues as Lake Louise Drive
Castle Junction	26.8	16.7	Banff–Windermere Highway to Highway 93 south / Highway 1 (TCH) – Radium Hot Springs	Former Highway 1B
	33.6	20.9	Johnston Creek Campground	
	33.6– 50.0	20.9– 31.1	Seasonal travel restriction Closed to all vehicular traffic, except bicycles; March 1 – June 25; Sept. 1-30	
	50.3	31.3	Highway 1 (TCH) – Banff, Calgary, Lake Louise	Interchange
1.000 mi = 1.609 km; 1.000 km = 0.621 mi: Incomplete access

== Bow Valley Trail ==
- Bow Valley Trail
- Length: 89 km (55 mi)
- West end: Highway 1 (TCH) in Canmore
- East end: 12 Mile Coulee Road, Calgary

The second of the 1A routes, known as the Bow Valley Trail, begins in Canmore, off of the Trans-Canada Highway at exit 91. It formerly began at the Trans-Canada Highway at exit 86 and passed through Canmore; however, ownership of the section was transferred to the Town of Canmore. The roadway still carries the name "Bow Valley Trail".

From exit 91, it heads eastbound, along the Canadian Pacific Railway tracks, until it reaches the Hamlet of Exshaw. From Exshaw, Bow Valley Trail heads to the northeast, past Highway 1X.

Just east of Highway 1X, Bow Valley Trail narrows and the speed limit is reduced to 80 km/h (50 mph) for approximately thirty kilometres as it passes through the Stoney-Nakoda First Nation, where warning signs that there may be livestock and/or pedestrians on the road are posted. Highway 1A passes Mînî Thnî approximately eight kilometres from the eastern boundary of the area; the community is situated just south of the highway. As the Highway leaves the area, it widens and the speed limit increases back to 100 km/h (62 mph). Shortly after resuming its normal speed limit, the highway skirts the north shore of Ghost Lake, a manmade glacier lake that is a popular spot for Calgary's boating and sailing enthusiasts in the summer, as well as ice sailing in the winter. The lake also supplies most of the water power for Calgary through TransAlta Utilities. Highway 1A meets northbound Highway 40 approximately 3 km (1.9 mi) after passing Ghost Lake.

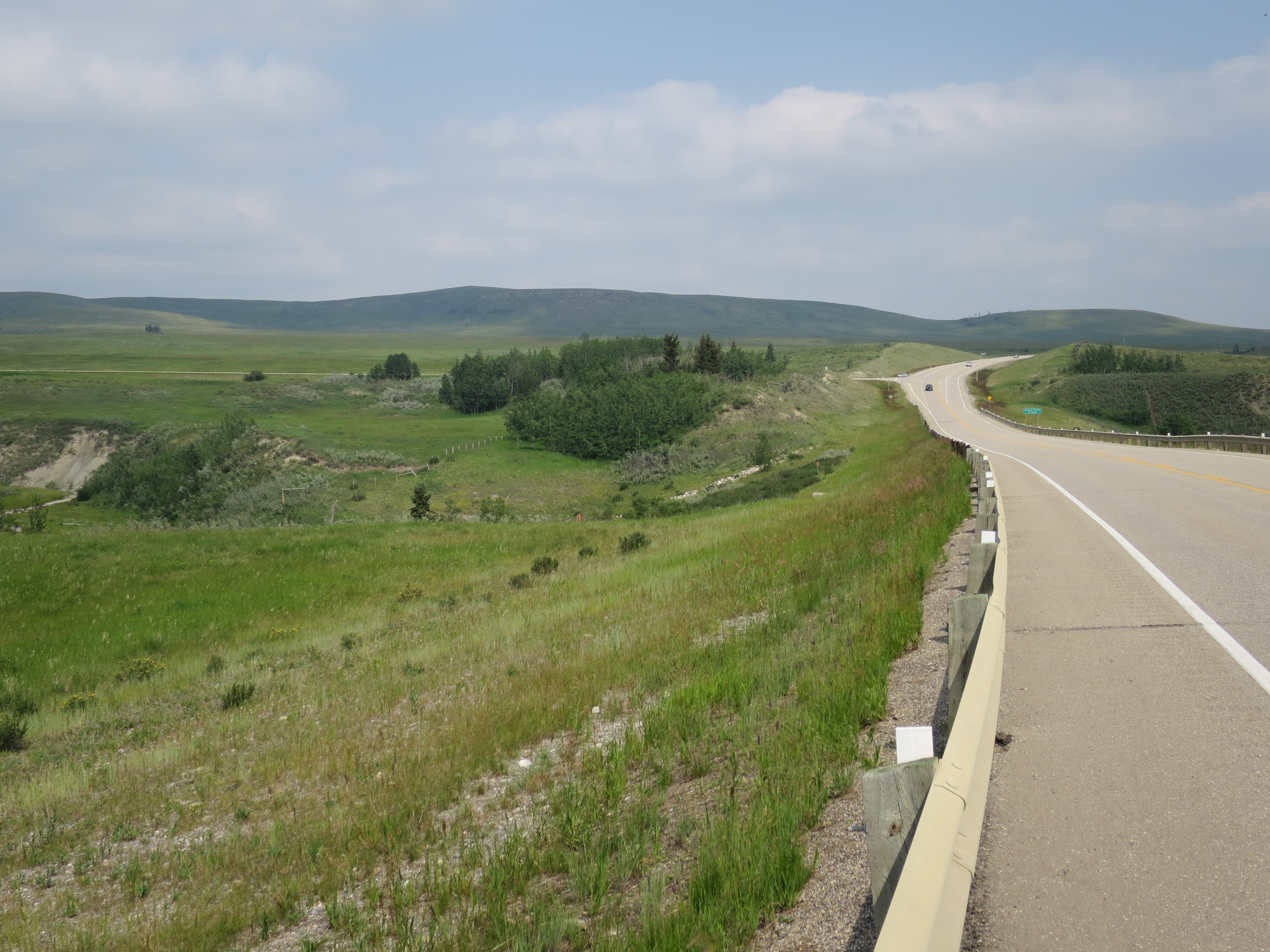
Looking east along the Bow Valley Trail crossing the Grand Valley Creek about 8 km west of Cochrane

From Highway 40, Bow Valley Trail proceeds towards the east, and then slightly to the southeast, before reaching the Town of Cochrane, where it intersects with Highway 22. There, the highway widens to 4 lanes as it leaves Cochrane and proceeds 18 km (11 mi) southeast until it reaches Calgary, meeting northbound Highway 766 about 6 km (3.7 mi) west of the city limits. Upon reaching the Calgary city limits at 12 Mile Coulee Road, it continues as Crowchild Trail, a major north-south expressway, (although it travels in a southeasterly direction from the city limits to 24 Avenue NW) through the northwest and southwest parts of the city. Within Calgary, Highway 1A officially ends at Stoney Trail (Highway 201), though prior to its completion Highway 1A continued along Crowchild Trail and with the Trans-Canada Highway (known as 16 Avenue N) near McMahon Stadium and the University of Calgary. The section along Crowchild Trail is maintained by the City of Calgary rather than Alberta Transportation.

Before 1972, this route was the only road to Banff National Park.

=== Major intersections ===
Starting from the west end of Highway 1A:

Rural/specialized municipality	Location	km	mi	Destinations	Notes
Canmore		−4.7	−2.9	Highway 1 (TCH) – Banff, Calgary	Highway 1 exit 86; former western terminus
Canmore		0.0	0.0	Highway 1 (TCH) – Banff, Calgary	Highway 1 exit 91; western terminus
M.D. of Bighorn No. 8	Exshaw	14.7	9.1		
M.D. of Bighorn No. 8		21.9	13.6	Highway 1X south – Seebe, Kananaskis Country	
Stoney Nos. 142, 143, and 144 (Stoney Nakoda First Nation)	Mînî Thnî	43.2	26.8	Mînî Thnî Road (Highway 133X south)	
M.D. of Bighorn No. 8	No major junctions				
M.D. of Bighorn No. 8–Rocky View County boundary	Ghost Lake	54.1	33.6	Crosses Ghost Lake	
Rocky View County		58.2	36.2	Highway 40 north (Forestry Trunk Road) – Benchlands, Waiparous, Sundre, Nordegg	
Cochrane		71.3	44.3	Highway 22 (Cowboy Trail) – Sundre, Bragg Creek	Interchange
Cochrane		73.9	45.9	Gleneagles Drive	Eastbound exit and westbound entrance
Rocky View County		83.6	51.9	Highway 766 north (Lochend Road / Range Road 32) – Madden	
Rocky View County	Bearspaw	87.1	54.1	Bearspaw Road (Range Road 30)	Traffic lights
City of Calgary		89.6	55.7	12 Mile Coulee Road	Calgary city limits; becomes Crowchild Trail
City of Calgary		92.0	57.2	Stoney Trail (Highway 201)	Interchange; Highway 201 exit 41; Highway 1A eastern terminus
City of Calgary		See Crowchild Trail			
City of Calgary		102.0	63.4	16 Avenue NW (Highway 1 (TCH)) – Medicine Hat, Banff Crowchild Trail south – City Centre	Interchange; former Highway 1A eastern terminus; Crowchild Trail continues
1.000 mi = 1.609 km; 1.000 km = 0.621 mi: Closed/former; Incomplete access

== Former alignments ==
=== Icefields Parkway ===
Highway 1A
- Icefields Parkway
- Location: Banff N.P, Jasper N.P.
- Length: 228 km (142 mi)
- Existed: 1940–1959

When initially constructed, the Icefields Parkway was designated as Highway 1A between Lake Louise and Jasper. The route was renumbered to Highway 93 in 1959.

=== Kicking Horse Pass ===
Highway 1A
- Location: Banff National Park
- Length: 6 km (3.7 mi)
- Existed: 1962–2000s

A former section of Highway 1A exists along the former Kicking Horse Trail, the original road between Lake Louise and Golden, British Columbia that opened in 1926. When the Trans-Canada Highway was realigned in 1962, the segment became Highway 1A. It began at British Columbia Highway 1, 3 km (2 mi) west of the Alberta border in Yoho National Park. It meandered eastward through Kicking Horse Pass to Lake Louise, generally paralleling the main Highway 1 and CPR rail line to the south. The section between Lake Louise (townsite) and Lake Louise (lake) is known as Lake Louise Drive, while the remainder of route is now closed to vehicle traffic and is part the Great Divide hiking trail.

=== 17 Avenue SE ===
Highway 1A
- 17 Avenue SE
- Location: Calgary, Chestermere
- Length: 14 km (8.7 mi)
- Existed: 1949–2013

Highway 1A used to be an alternate route that followed 17 Avenue SE in Calgary and linked with Highway 1 in Chestermere. It began at Highway 2 (Deerfoot Trail) and Blackfoot Trail interchange and continued east along 17 Avenue SE where it passed through the former town of Forest Lawn. It crossed 116 Street SE, entering Chestermere and terminated at the Highway 1 interchange. It was dropped by the province in 2013 and the section within Chestermere was renamed to Chestermere Boulevard. As of 2016, remnant Highway 1A signage still remains on Deerfoot Trail and sections of 17 Avenue SE within Calgary; however, it has been removed along Stoney Trail, through Chestermere, and along the Trans-Canada Highway.

=== Downtown Calgary ===
Highway 1A
- Location: Calgary
- Length: 11 km (6.8 mi)
- Existed: 1949–1970s

The existing Bow Valley Trail / Crowchild Trail section and former 17 Avenue SE section of Highway 1A used to be connected by following a series of streets through inner-city Calgary. From its present terminus, Highway 1A followed 16 Avenue NW east and was cosigned with Highway 1 to 14 Street NW. Highway 1A turned south, and after crossing the Bow River using the Mewata Bridge, and then branches east at its interchange Bow Trail. Highway 1A passed through downtown Calgary on a pair of one-way streets, with eastbound traffic following 9 Avenue S and westbound traffic following 6 Avenue S. East of 6 Street SE, both directions of Highway 1A followed 9 Avenue SE, crossing the Elbow River on the Inglewood Bridge and passing through the community of Inglewood, linking with eastern section of Highway 1A by either using 16 Street SE and Blackfoot Trail, or directly along 17 Avenue SE. This section of Highway 1A was dropped in the 1970s.

=== Brooks – Medicine Hat ===
Highway 1A
- Old Trans-Canada Highway
- Location: County of Newell, Cypress County
- Length: 101 km (63 mi)

A former alignment of the Trans-Canada Highway between Brooks and Medicine Hat, through County of Newell and Cypress County, is locally referred to as Highway 1A. Running parallel to Highway 1, it runs to the south along the Canadian Pacific Railway mainline. The road is paved between Brooks and Highway 875, with long-term plans to pave it to Tilley, as well as some sections around Suffield. Between Tilley and Suffield, the road has both gravel and unimproved sections and serves as a local ranch-access road. Once in Cypress County, it is referred to as the Old Trans-Canada Highway, while in Redcliff and Medicine Hat, it goes by South Railway Avenue and Saamis Drive.

Despite the Highway 1A name, the route is maintained by the local municipalities and is not part of the provincial highway system.

== Highway 1X ==
Highway 1X

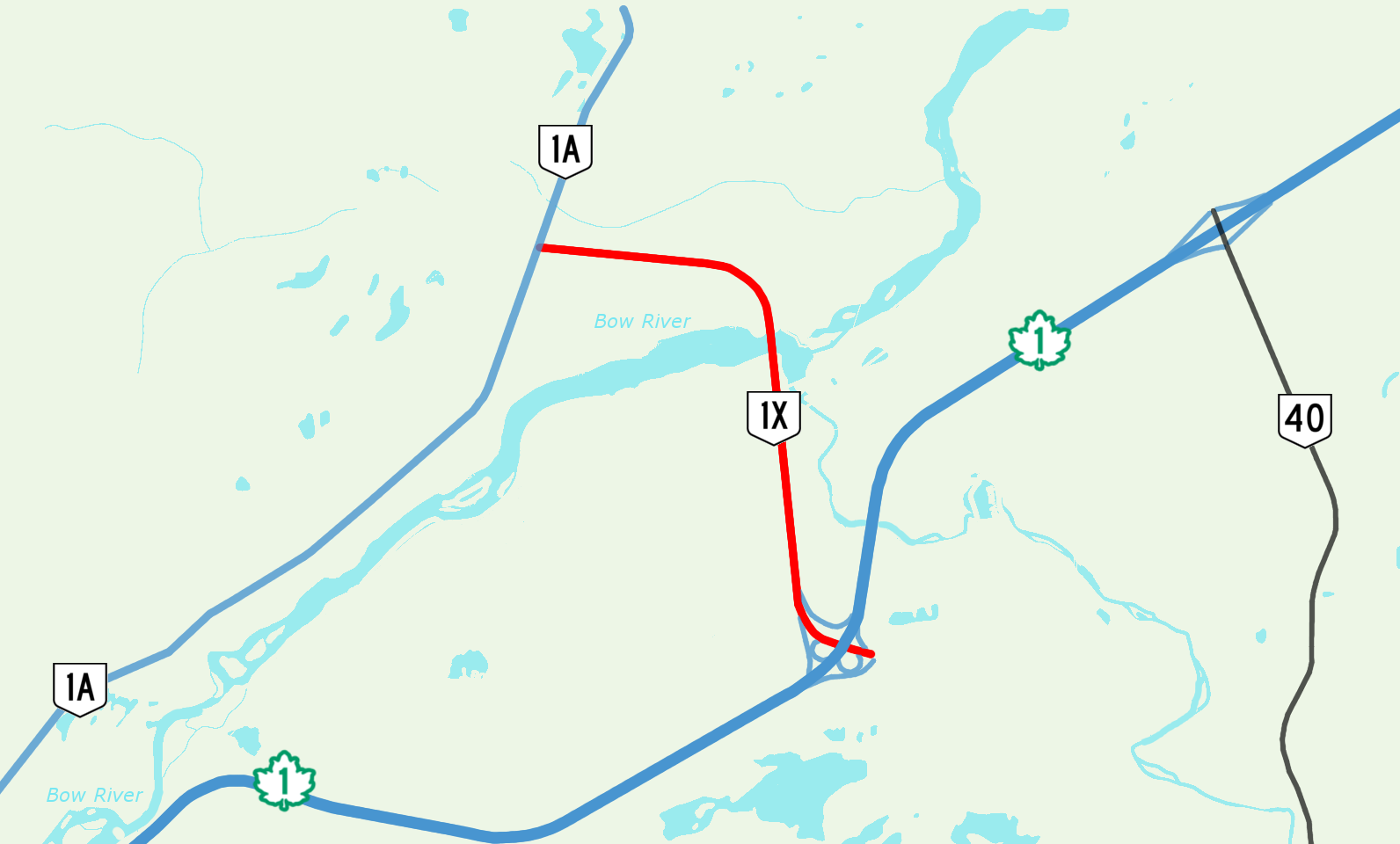
- Highway 1X highlighted in red

Route information
- Auxiliary route of Highway 1
- Maintained by Alberta Transportation
- Length: 4.5 km (2.8 mi)

Major junctions
- South end: Highway 1 (TCH) west of Seebe
- North end: Highway 1A east of Exshaw

Location
- Country: Canada
- Province: Alberta
- Specialized and rural municipalities: Kananaskis I.D., Bighorn No. 8 M.D.

Highway system
- Alberta Numbered Highway Network; List; Former
← Highway 1A	→ Highway 2

Highway 1X is a spur highway between Highway 1 and Highway 1A approximately 7 km (4.3 mi) east of Exshaw near the western edge of the Stoney-Nakoda First Nation. It serves as the only Bow River crossing between Canmore to the west and Mînî Thnî to the east, providing access to First Nations lands and communities in the area. At 4.5 km (2.8 mi) in length, it is one of Alberta's shortest provincial highways.

=== Future ===
Highway 1X is the designation of two proposed bypasses around Strathmore and Medicine Hat. The Strathmore bypass, temporarily designated as Highway 1X:12, would bypass the town of Strathmore to the south, bypassing approximately 8 km (5 mi) of existing Highway 1. The project would also feature a realignment of Highway 24 to follow Highway 817 between Carseland and Strathmore. The Medicine Hat bypass, temporarily designated as Highway 1X:20, would bypass the City of Medicine Hat to the south and west, as well as the Town of Redcliff and the Hamlet of Dunmore; bypassing approximately 33 km (21 mi) of existing Highway 1. Both bypasses are currently unfunded with no timeline for construction. Once the bypasses are completed, they would be signed as part of Highway 1.

=== Major intersections ===
Rural/specialized municipality	Location	km	mi	Destinations	Notes
Kananaskis Improvement District		0.0	0.0	Highway 1 (TCH) – Canmore, Banff, Calgary	Highway 1 exit 114
M.D. of Bighorn No. 8	Seebe	2.2	1.4	Crosses the Bow River	
M.D. of Bighorn No. 8		4.5	2.8	Highway 1A (Bow Valley Trail) – Kananaskis, Exshaw, Cochrane	
1.000 mi = 1.609 km; 1.000 km = 0.621 mi
