= Kananaskis, Alberta =

Unincorporated community in Alberta, Canada

Coordinates: 51°04′34″N 115°07′46″W

Location of Kananaskis, Alberta

Kananaskis is an unincorporated community in Alberta's Rockies within the Municipal District of Bighorn No. 8 of Alberta, Canada. It is located on Highway 1A approximately 18 km (11 mi) east of Canmore and 54 km (34 mi) west of Cochrane. The community is located on the north shore of the Bow River.

Nearby are a sand and gravel quarry and a garbage landfill. Electricity is provided by hydropower from Horseshoe Dam.

== Climate ==
Climate data for Kananaskis
| Month | Jan | Feb | Mar | Apr | May | Jun | Jul | Aug | Sep | Oct | Nov | Dec | Year |
|---|---|---|---|---|---|---|---|---|---|---|---|---|---|
| Record high °C (°F) | 19.0 (66.2) | 18.0 (64.4) | 20.5 (68.9) | 26.1 (79.0) | 29.5 (85.1) | 31.1 (88.0) | 34.5 (94.1) | 33.3 (91.9) | 31.0 (87.8) | 27.2 (81.0) | 19.5 (67.1) | 16.1 (61.0) | 34.5 (94.1) |
| Mean daily maximum °C (°F) | −0.3 (31.5) | 1.3 (34.3) | 4.5 (40.1) | 9.4 (48.9) | 14.4 (57.9) | 18.3 (64.9) | 22.1 (71.8) | 21.6 (70.9) | 16.5 (61.7) | 10.4 (50.7) | 2.8 (37.0) | −1.0 (30.2) | 10.0 (50.0) |
| Daily mean °C (°F) | −6.1 (21.0) | −4.7 (23.5) | −1.6 (29.1) | 3.2 (37.8) | 7.7 (45.9) | 11.4 (52.5) | 14.5 (58.1) | 13.8 (56.8) | 9.4 (48.9) | 4.5 (40.1) | −2.3 (27.9) | −6.2 (20.8) | 3.6 (38.5) |
| Mean daily minimum °C (°F) | −11.7 (10.9) | −10.7 (12.7) | −7.7 (18.1) | −3.1 (26.4) | 0.9 (33.6) | 4.5 (40.1) | 6.8 (44.2) | 6.0 (42.8) | 2.2 (36.0) | −1.5 (29.3) | −7.3 (18.9) | −11.4 (11.5) | −2.7 (27.1) |
| Record low °C (°F) | −45.6 (−50.1) | −43.5 (−46.3) | −40.6 (−41.1) | −31.1 (−24.0) | −21.7 (−7.1) | −8.3 (17.1) | −2.5 (27.5) | −4.0 (24.8) | −14.0 (6.8) | −29.0 (−20.2) | −37.0 (−34.6) | −42.2 (−44.0) | −45.6 (−50.1) |
| Average precipitation mm (inches) | 21.2 (0.83) | 21.0 (0.83) | 40.7 (1.60) | 55.4 (2.18) | 88.5 (3.48) | 119.4 (4.70) | 64.9 (2.56) | 70.8 (2.79) | 72.8 (2.87) | 39.0 (1.54) | 26.7 (1.05) | 18.9 (0.74) | 639.4 (25.17) |
| Average rainfall mm (inches) | 1.2 (0.05) | 0.3 (0.01) | 2.9 (0.11) | 13.9 (0.55) | 60.5 (2.38) | 118.2 (4.65) | 64.9 (2.56) | 70.2 (2.76) | 56.6 (2.23) | 11.2 (0.44) | 3.4 (0.13) | 1.1 (0.04) | 404.6 (15.93) |
| Average snowfall cm (inches) | 22.0 (8.7) | 23.7 (9.3) | 41.7 (16.4) | 44.9 (17.7) | 29.2 (11.5) | 1.2 (0.5) | 0.0 (0.0) | 0.6 (0.2) | 16.3 (6.4) | 29.6 (11.7) | 28.4 (11.2) | 19.2 (7.6) | 256.5 (101.0) |
Source: Environment Canada

== See also ==
- List of communities in Alberta
