= Harvie Heights =

- Hamlet
- Location of Harvie Heights Harvie Heights (Canada)
- Coordinates: 51°7′31″N 115°23′6″W
- Country: Canada
- Province: Alberta
- Region: Alberta's Rockies
- Census division: 15
- Municipal district: Municipal District of Bighorn No. 8

Government
  - Type: Unincorporated
  - Governing body: Municipal District of Bighorn No. 8 Council

Area (2021)
  - Land: 0.62 km^{2} (0.24 sq mi)

Population (2021)
  - Total: 163
  - Density: 261.6/km^{2} (678/sq mi)
- Time zone: UTC−06:00 (Alberta Time)
- Area codes: 403, 587, 825

Harvie Heights is a hamlet in Alberta, Canada, in the Municipal District of Bighorn No. 8. Located within Alberta's Rockies along Highway 1 of the Trans-Canada Highway, it lies immediately east of the gate to Banff National Park. It is situated 5 km (3.1 mi) from Canmore and 13 km (8.1 mi) from Dead Man's Flats.

== Toponymy ==
Harvie Heights was named by the Government of Alberta in honour of John Harvie (1887-1952), a civil servant who held several roles for the provincial government. Notably, Harvie served as deputy minister for what is now the Ministry of Forestry and Parks. He also conceived an early iteration of the Energy Resources Conservation Board at the behest of John Edward Brownlee.

== Topography ==
Harvie Heights is located within the benchlands of the Bow Valley, 1,320 m above sea level. Its terrain consists of alluvial fan deposits of gravel, sand, clay, and silt.

The hamlet enjoys access to the highest density of groundwater wells in the valley. Due to contamination from septic drain fields and road salt over time, groundwater samples have shown elevated levels of sodium and chloride.

Of note is the nearby Fern Forest spring, which in actuality is a groundwater discharge site. It supports dense foliage of field horsetail and an old-growth forest of fir and spruce.

== History ==
=== Pre-settlement ===
Archaeological evidence dating to the middle Holocene epoch suggests that Harvie Heights served as a campsite and bison hunting ground for Indigenous peoples.

=== 20th century: 1951–2000 ===
The Government of Alberta established Harvie Heights in July 1951 to serve as a summer village for tourists to Banff National Park. Initially, the province offered 10-year leases for 64 lots. The locality contained 106 sites within a year, and the provincial government began to consider selling land to full-time occupants. In the late 1950s, a cabin was relocated from Banff to serve as Harvie Heights' community hall.

By the early 1960s, Harvie Heights had a permanent population of around 60 people. Residents primarily comprised families with ties to the area's early settlers, and commuters to Canmore or Banff. A bus service was established that decade so that children could attend schools in Banff. Harvie Heights' name was recognized for federal mapping purposes in July 1964.

When strip mining began at Mount Rundle around 1970, approximately 8 km (5.0 mi) away, residents of the locality mounted protests that continued into the following year. Strip mining ended in the area in 1974.

The Government of Alberta designated Harvie Heights as a hamlet on January 10, 1979. Harvie Heights' population reached 159 in the 1981 federal census, but a provincial study conducted two years later identified a further 228 second home residents, bringing its highest potential population to around 390.

In 1988, Canmore's wastewater system was connected to Harvie Heights.

=== 21st century: 2001–present ===
Harvie Heights received permanent water infrastructure in 2005.

In early 2024, the Municipal District of Bighorn No. 8 began devising redevelopment proposals for Harvie Heights, reviewing its traffic control, commercial planning, and stormwater management systems. The hamlet received media attention later that year when Alberta's best-known bear, The Boss, visited in November and ate crab apples growing in a resident's backyard.

The municipality of Bighorn announced Harvie Heights' redevelopment plan in 2025.

== Services ==
Harvie Heights has few commercial services or businesses, other than hotels. Residents primarily utilize Canmore's services and amenities.

=== Recreation ===
The Harvie Heights Community Association owns and operates the hamlet's community hall. Harvie Heights also hosts an outdoor skating rink, playground, and tennis court.

== Demographics ==
Population history of Harvie Heights
| Year | Pop. | ±% |
|---|---|---|
| 1961 | 62 | — |
| 1966 | 103 | +66.1% |
| 1971 | 196 | +90.3% |
| 1976 | 196 | +0.0% |
| 1981 | 159 | −18.9% |
| 1986 | 178 | +11.9% |
| 1991 | 160 | −10.1% |
| 1991A | 162 | +1.2% |
| 1996 | 160 | −1.2% |
| 2001 | 172 | +7.5% |
| 2006 | 207 | +20.3% |
| 2011 | 175 | −15.5% |
| 2016 | 184 | +5.1% |
| 2021 | 163 | −11.4% |
Source: Statistics Canada

In the 2021 Census of Population conducted by Statistics Canada, Harvie Heights had a population of 163 living in 81 of its 152 total private dwellings, a change of −11.4% from its 2016 population of 184. With a land area of 0.62 km^{2} (0.24 sq mi), it had a population density of 262.9/km^{2} (680.9/sq mi) in 2021.

As a designated place in the 2016 Census of Population conducted by Statistics Canada, Harvie Heights had a population of 184 living in 76 of its 113 total private dwellings, a change of 5.1% from its 2011 population of 175. With a land area of 0.62 km^{2} (0.24 sq mi), it had a population density of 296.8/km^{2} (768.6/sq mi) in 2016.

== Notable residents ==
- Bruno Engler (1915 – 2001) – mountaineer, freelance CBC News correspondent, and photographer; moved to Harvie Heights in 1955
- Hans Gmoser (1932 – 2006) – influential mountaineer and long-term resident of Harvie Heights

== See also ==
- List of communities in Alberta
- List of designated places in Alberta
- List of hamlets in Alberta
