= Alberta Highway 1 =

Alberta segment of Trans-Canada Highway

Highway 1
- Trans-Canada Highway
- Highway 1 highlighted in red

Route information
- Maintained by the Ministry of Transportation and Economic Corridors
- Length: 533.8 km (331.7 mi)
- Existed: 1941–present

Major junctions
- West end: Highway 1 (TCH) at BC border
- Highway 93 in Lake Louise; Highway 22 near Cochrane; Highway 201 in Calgary; Highway 2 in Calgary; Highway 9 near Langdon; Highway 21 near Strathmore; Highway 56 near Crowfoot; Highway 36 near Brooks; Highway 3 in Medicine Hat; Highway 41 near Dunmore
- East end: Highway 1 (TCH) at SK border

Location
- Country: Canada
- Province: Alberta
- Specialized and rural municipalities: I.D. No. 9, Bighorn No. 8 M.D., Kananaskis I.D., Rocky View County, Wheatland County, Newell County, Cypress County
- Major cities: Calgary, Brooks, Chestermere, Medicine Hat
- Towns: Banff, Canmore, Strathmore, Bassano, Redcliff

Highway system
- Alberta Numbered Highway Network; List; Former
← Highway 986	→ Highway 1A

Highway 1 is a major east–west highway in southern Alberta that forms the southern mainline of the Trans-Canada Highway. It runs from the British Columbia border at Kicking Horse Pass near Lake Louise through Alberta's largest city, Calgary, to the Saskatchewan border east of Medicine Hat. It continues as Highway 1 into Saskatchewan and Manitoba. It spans approximately 534 kilometres (332 mi) from Alberta's border with British Columbia in the west to its border with Saskatchewan in the east. Highway 1 is designated as a core route in Canada's National Highway System and is a core part of the developing Alberta Freeway Network.

== Route description ==
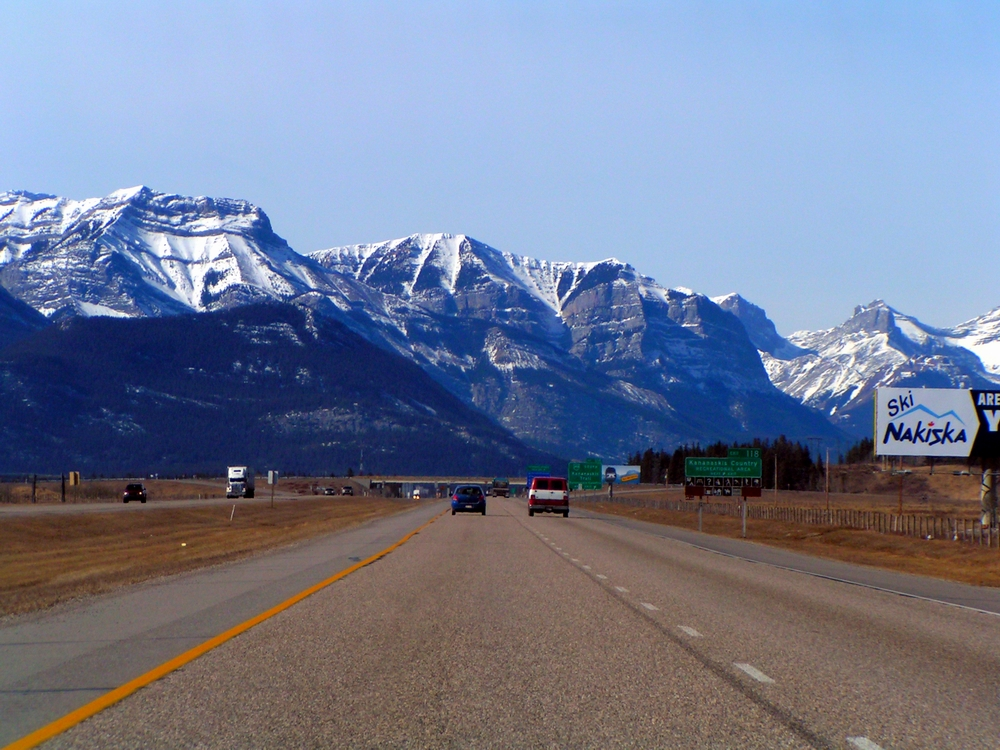
Westbound to the Rocky Mountains

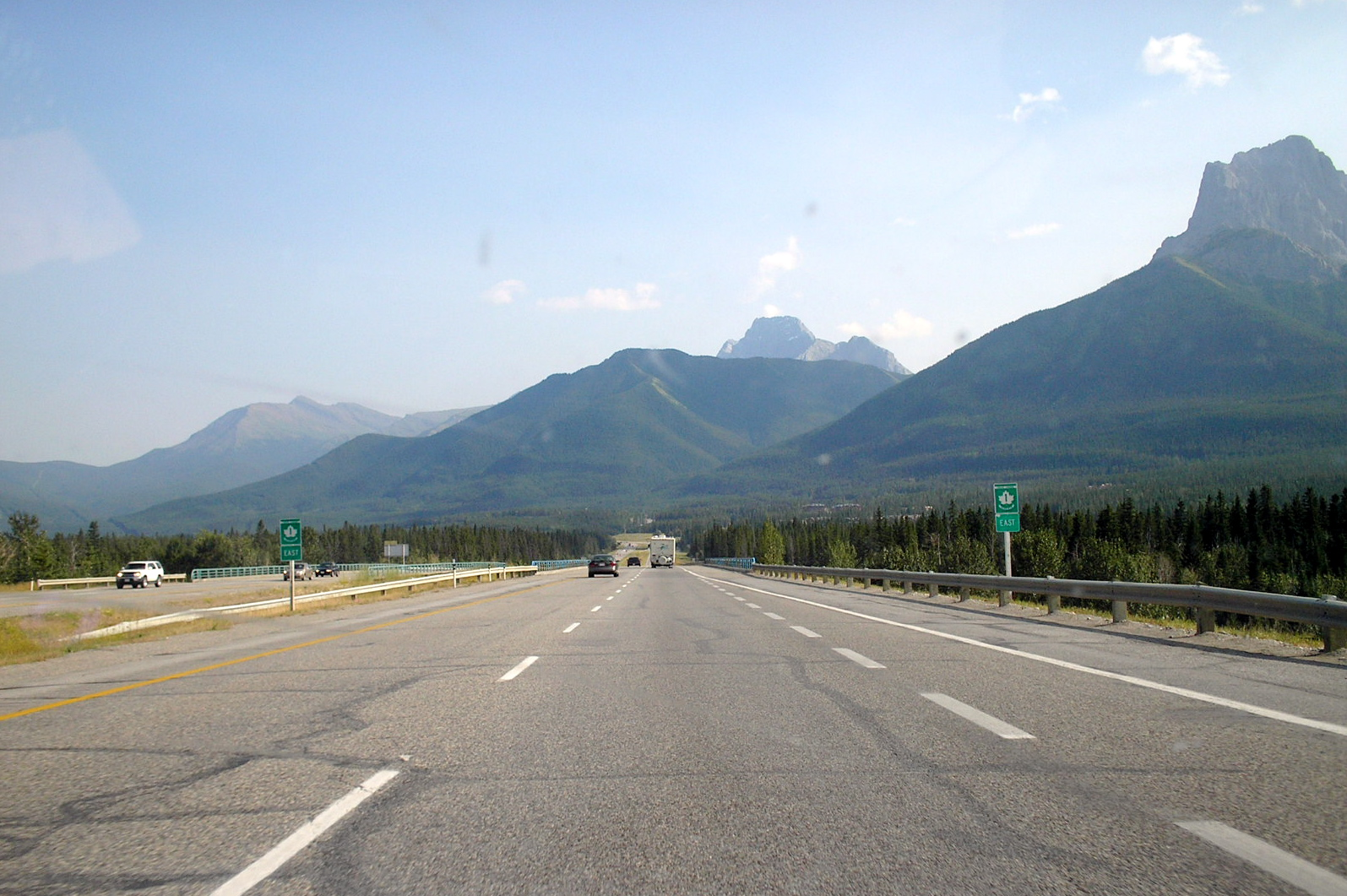
Eastbound near Canmore

Since Parks Canada completed the twinning of the final 8.5 km (5.3 mi) of Highway 1 between Lake Louise and the British Columbia border in June 2012, the entire length of Highway 1 is now a minimum of four lanes. The highway is a freeway between the Sunshine and Sarcee Trail Interchanges with no at-grade intersections. The rest of the highway (outside of Calgary) mostly consists of a divided four-lane expressway with a few interchanges or signal lights only near major communities (such as Medicine Hat) and at-grade intersections. In Calgary, the highway consists of a blend of both limited-access (freeway) sections and heavily signalizes arterial thoroughfares carrying four to six lanes.

=== Banff National Park ===
The entire segment of Highway 1 through the Banff National Park is maintained by the Government of Canada. All sections of Highway 1 in the National Park have wildlife fences and crossings to keep animals off the road while still allowing for migration. The speed limit on Highway 1 in the National Park is 90 km/h (56 mph).

British Columbia Highway 1 becomes Alberta Highway 1 as it crosses Kicking Horse Pass into Alberta (the pass also marks the boundary between Yoho National Park and Banff National Park). From the pass, the four-lane highway descends a moderate grade before turning southeast to follow the wide Bow River valley. Upon reaching the bottom of the hill, Highway 1 crosses the Bow River for the first time. Immediately afterwards, it reaches its first junction at an interchange to head north on Highway 93 (the Icefields Parkway). Highway 93 South runs concurrently with Highway 1 for the next 25 km (16 mi). Shortly after that Highway 1/93 crosses the Pipestone River and passes through another small diamond interchange at Lake Louise Drive servicing the Hamlet of Lake Louise, the Lake Louise Ski Resort, The Bow Valley Parkway (Highway 1A) and access to Lake Louise itself as well as Moraine Lake. From there, the highway crosses the Bow River for the second time and travels along the west bank of the river passing by the Taylor Lake trailhead before reaching an important interchange for Highway 93 South (Banff-Radium Highway) which is also a midpoint access to the Bow Valley Parkway. From there, the highway continues past two more at-grade trailhead turn-offs (Redearth and Bourgeau Lake) with views of the Sawback Range along the way. After passing an interchange for the Banff-Sunshine Ski Area, the highway bends to the east, crosses the Bow River for a third time, and passes through a small interchange for the Bow Valley Parkway before climbing up from the river alongside a cliff with a rest area on the eastbound side giving views of Mount Rundle, the Banff townsite and the Vermilion Lakes. Shortly afterwards, the highway then passes through an interchange servicing Banff and the Mt Norquay ski area. From there, the highway bends to the southeast while passing through another interchange providing access to Banff and Lake Minnewanka. The highway then continues south along the benchlands above the Bow River before exiting the park 81 km (50 mi) from the BC border.

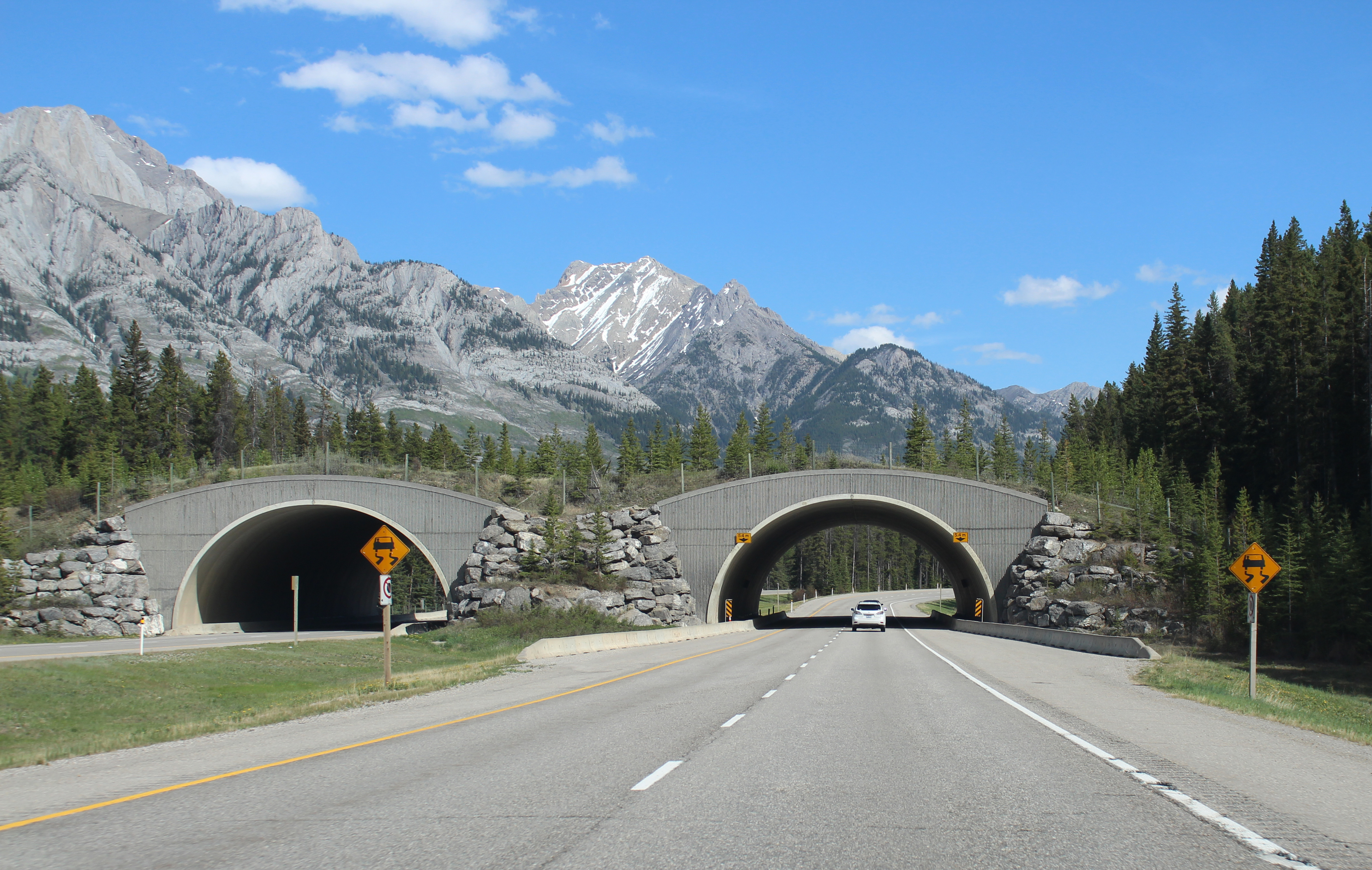
Wildlife overpass on eastbound Alberta Highway 1 in Banff National Park.

=== Canmore to Calgary ===
Upon exiting Banff National Park, Highway 1 is maintained by Alberta Transportation for 91 km (57 mi) until it reaches Calgary. This segment of the highway travels generally east through the rural municipalities of the Municipal District of Bighorn No. 8 and Rocky View County, It also briefly crosses a portion of Kananaskis Improvement District. This entire section is a controlled-access highway with no at grade intersections. The speed limit on this section of Highway 1 is 110 km/h (68 mph). Highway 1A (Bow Valley Trail), the original highway from Canmore to Calgary, is an alternate route to this segment of Highway 1, providing access to the Hamlet of Exshaw, the Summer Village of Ghost Lake, and the Town of Cochrane.

Shortly after leaving Banff National Park, the highway passes through the Hamlet of Harvie Heights and the mountain town of Canmore which is serviced by four interchanges, Highway 1A (Bow Valley Trail), Benchlands Trail, Highway 1A (Bow Valley Trail) and after crossing the Bow River, Alberta Highway 742 (Three Sisters Parkway). From there, the highway curves east again and travels by the hamlets of Dead Man's Flats and Lac des Arcs each serviced by its own interchange. A westbound rest area on the shore of Lac des Arcs provides access to the water. From there, the highway exits the mountains, passing the interchange for Alberta Highway 1X, a one-kilometre (0.62 mi) connection to Highway 1A (also used to access Bow Valley Provincial Park). It then crosses the Kananaskis River, enters the Stoney-Nakoda First Nation Reserve, and shortly afterwards passes the interchange for Alberta Highway 40 (Kananaskis Trail), the main access to Kananaskis Country. The highway then continues east across the Morley Reserve passing by 3 more interchanges for minor reserve roads, before climbing up a short, but steep hill to a high point at Jack Lake Hill and exiting the Reserve. After descending from the hill, Highway 1 passes a small interchange for little used Highway 68 and continues due east across level terrain and agricultural lands, passing through several other small interchanges. As it approaches Calgary, the highway passes an important interchange at Highway 22 servicing the town of Cochrane and Bragg Creek, where traffic volumes double. Traffic continues to pick up as it passes through the Springbank semi-rural area through two more interchanges at Springbank Road and Highway 563 (Old Banff Coach Road) after which the highway widens from four to eight lanes and enters Calgary city limits. Immediately after entering Calgary, the highway enters a large free-flowing combination interchange with Stoney Trail (Highway 201) after which Alberta Transportation authority ends and Highway 1 becomes City of Calgary-maintained 16th Avenue.

=== 16th Avenue ===
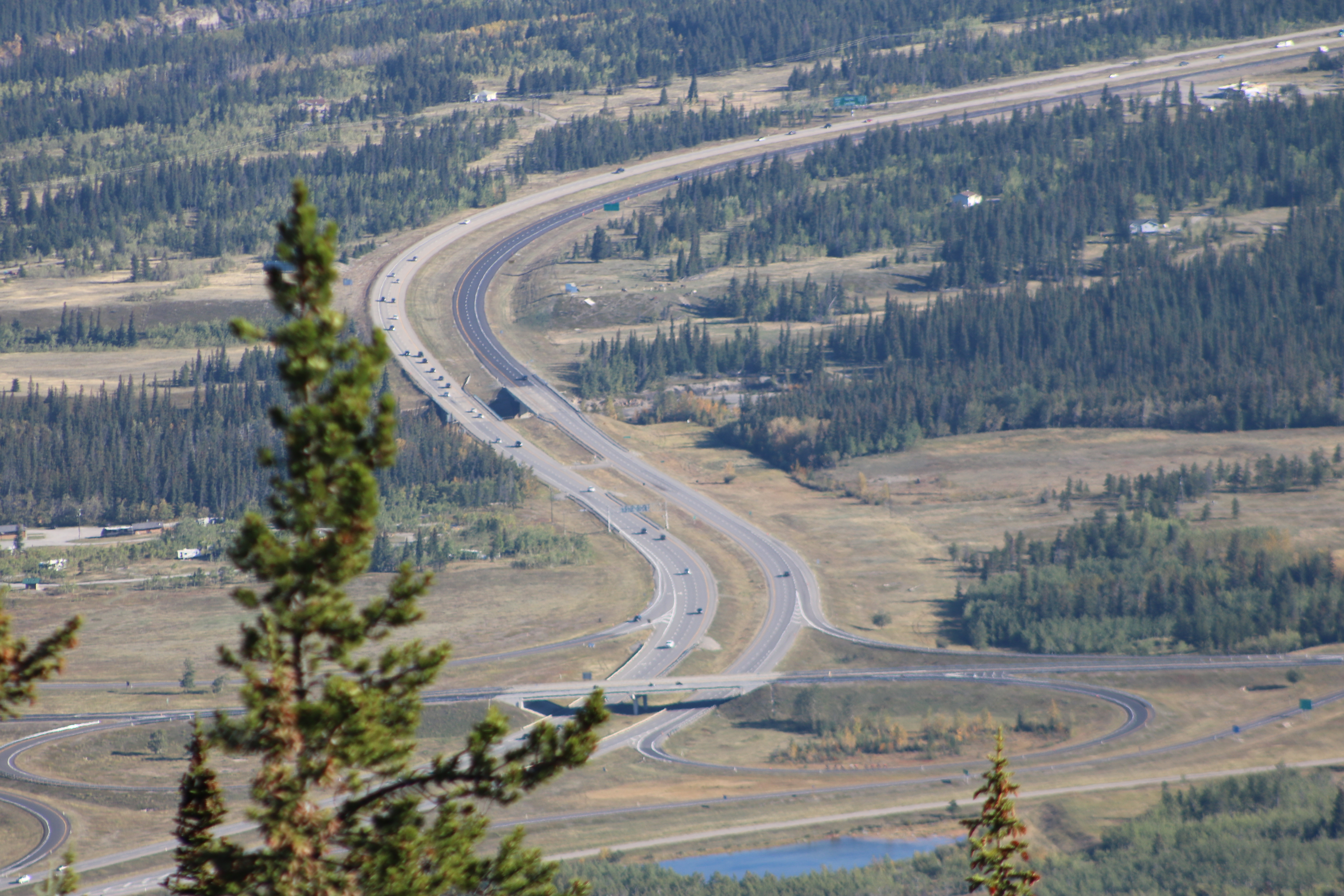
Highway 1 and 1X interchange and with crossing of the Kananaskis River visible.

In Calgary, Highway 1 follows 16 Avenue N and is maintained by the City of Calgary for its 27-kilometre (17 mi) length. Plans for a crosstown Highway 1 Freeway were cancelled decades ago, leaving the city section of Highway 1 as primarily an urban arterial road. Stoney Trail (Highway 201) provides an alternate controlled-access freeway route around the north and south sides of the city and is the signed bypass of 16 Avenue. The ring road was built in stages over more than two decades: the northwest and northeast legs opened in 2009, the southeast leg in 2013, and the west leg in two stages in 2020 and 2021, with the final southwest segment across Tsuut'ina Nation land opening in 2023, completing a continuous 101-kilometre free-flow route around the city. It is also possible to head south on Stoney Trail to link up with Alberta Highway 22X in South Calgary, which eventually connects back to Highway 1 near Gleichen.

After the Interchange with Stoney Trail, 16th Avenue continues as a freeway passing through an interchange with Canada Olympic Drive and Sarcee Trail, before crossing the Bow River for the fifth and final time, entering the neighbourhood of Montgomery. There, the freeway ends, and the speed limit drops to 50 km/h (31 mph) with 16th Avenue becoming a 4-lane "urban boulevard" (as defined by the City of Calgary) with multiple signal lights. After exiting Montgomery, 16th Avenue begins short four-lane expressway section with some small interchanges at Shaganappi Trail, West Campus Way, University Drive and Crowchild Trail (as well as a signalized interchange at 29th Street) as it passes by the Foothills Medical Centre and McMahon Stadium. It then enters central Calgary and becomes a heavily developed, six-lane urban boulevard once again, passing through 21 signal lights before reaching Deerfoot Trail (Highway 2) where it crosses the major freeway on a split diamond interchange featuring more signal lights on 16th Avenue. In East Calgary, the highway becomes a four-lane expressway once again passing through three interchanges (Barlow Trail, 36th Street, and 52nd Street) and two signal lights (19th Street and 68th Street) before City of Calgary authority ends and Highway 1 enters an Alberta Transportation maintained free-flowing interchange with Stoney Trail (Highway 201) at the edge of the city.

=== Calgary to Saskatchewan ===
Upon exiting Calgary, Highway 1 is maintained by Alberta Transportation for 273 km (170 mi) until it reaches the City of Medicine Hat. This segment of the highway generally travels in a southeast direction through the rural municipalities of Rocky View County, Wheatland County, the County of Newell, and Cypress County. The speed limit on the highway east of Calgary is mostly 110 km/h (68 mph) except in Medicine Hat and Strathmore.

Upon exiting Calgary, the highway becomes a rural expressway with at-grade intersections and limited interchanges. Shortly after leaving Calgary the highway enters the City of Chestermere and passes through an interchange at Chestermere Boulevard (formerly Highway 1A). From there Highway 1 goes straight east through flat terrain with the only major junctions being an interchange for Highway 9 and at grade intersections for Highway 791 and Highway 24. It then enters the town of Strathmore (which features a 50-kilometre-per-hour (31 mph) speed limit and several signal lights) marking the limit of most Calgary commuter traffic. From there on east to Medicine Hat the highway is flat and has few corners. There are no significant communities along this long section of highway except for Bassano, Brooks, and Suffield, and no interchanges except at two junctions in Brooks. The only noteworthy junctions on this stretch of Highway 1 are at Highway 56 and Highway 36 (both at grade).

Within Medicine Hat, Highway 1 is a controlled access highway with 6 interchanges. The majority of the highway in the city is a freeway; however, a section between the South Saskatchewan River and Seven Persons Creek still has a few at-grade intersections. The length of Highway 1 within Medicine Hat is 13 km (8.1 mi).

East of Medicine Hat, Highway 1 is maintained by Alberta Transportation for 48 km (30 mi) until it enters Saskatchewan, continuing as Saskatchewan Highway 1. This segment of the highway generally travels in an east direction through Cypress County. For urban communities, this segment passes through the Hamlet of Dunmore and by the hamlets of Irvine and Walsh. Highway 41 (which has a short concurrency with Highway 1) is the only noteworthy junction east of Medicine Hat.

== History ==
A review of historical Alberta Official Road Maps shows that Highway 1 was numbered Highway 2 prior to 1941 (while Highway 2 as it is known today was numbered Highway 1 prior to 1941).

Exit numbering along Highway 1 began in 2005. As of March 2010, only the stretch of Highway 1 between Banff National Park and Calgary had been assigned exit numbers.

Between 1964 and 1972, a completely new route from Calgary to Canmore was built. The route included new overpasses, bridges, the Canmore Bypass, and a four-lane divided highway. In 1976, Parks Canada began twinning Highway 1 through Banff National Park, with the highway twinned to Banff by 1985 and to Castle Junction by 1997. Twinning of the 33.5-kilometre (20.8 mi) section between Castle Junction and the British Columbia border was completed in 2014, with the final 8.5 km (5.3 mi) of Highway 1 between Lake Louise and the British Columbia border opening to traffic on June 12 of that year. Between 1973 and 1990 the highway was twinned from Calgary to the Saskatchewan Border.

== Future ==
Alberta Transportation has long-term, conceptual plans for Highway 1 to have a phased upgrade to a freeway standard within its area of jurisdiction (outside Banff National Park and Calgary city limits). Currently, areas that have been studied are a proposed interchange located between Garden Road and Conrich Road, Rainbow Road near Chestermere, and Highway 36 near Brooks. There is not timeline for construction of these interchanges.

=== Strathmore ===
Alberta Transportation has plans for a bypass around the Town of Strathmore. Initial proposals included a realignment northwest of Gleichen, continuing west to run south of Eagle Lake and then continuing northwest where it will rejoin the existing alignment near Cheadle, between Highway 24 and Strathmore, as well as a link to the Highway 22X corridor. The final proposal is a more scaled back realignment around Strathmore to the south, bypassing approximately 8 kilometres (5 mi) of existing Highway 1, and the right-of-way is currently designated as Highway 1X. There is no timeline for construction.

=== Medicine Hat ===
The Trans-Canada Highway has a few remaining signalized intersections within Medicine Hat, and Alberta Transportation is studying both a long-term realignment of Highway 1, as well as possible upgrades to the existing alignment. The realignment would bypass Redcliff, Medicine Hat and Dunmore to the south, bypassing approximately 33 kilometres (21 mi) of existing Highway 1, and the right-of-way is also currently designated as Highway 1X. Possible upgrades to the existing alignment include a new interchange at 1 Street SW and intersection closures at 6 Street SW and 16 Street SW. There is no timeline for the bypass construction or any upgrades to the existing alignment.

== Major intersections ==
Rural/specialized municipality	Location	km	mi	Exit	Destinations	Notes
I.D. No. 9 (Banff National Park)		0.0	0.0	—	Highway 1 (TCH) west – Field, Golden	Continental Divide; continues into British Columbia and Yoho National Park; west end of freeway
I.D. No. 9 (Banff National Park)		0.0	0.0	Kicking Horse Pass – elevation 1,627 m (5,338 ft)		
I.D. No. 9 (Banff National Park)		6.7	4.2	(7)	Highway 93 north (Icefields Parkway) – Jasper, Rocky Mountain House	West end of Highway 93 concurrency; tolled, National Park Pass required
I.D. No. 9 (Banff National Park)	Lake Louise	9.3	5.8	(10)	Highway 1A east (Bow Valley Parkway) / Lake Louise Drive west	
I.D. No. 9 (Banff National Park)	Castle Junction	34.7	21.6	(35)	Highway 93 south (Banff–Windermere Highway) – Kootenay National Park, Radium Hot Springs; To Highway 1A (Bow Valley Parkway)	East end of Highway 93 concurrency
I.D. No. 9 (Banff National Park)		56.7	35.2	(56)	Sunshine Road	To Sunshine Village
I.D. No. 9 (Banff National Park)		58.8	36.5	(59)	Highway 1A west (Bow Valley Parkway)	Seasonal travel restrictions
I.D. No. 9 (Banff National Park)	Banff	64.5	40.1	(65)	Norquay Road – Banff, Mount Norquay ski resort	
I.D. No. 9 (Banff National Park)	Banff	66.5	41.3	(67)	Industrial area (Compound Road)	Eastbound right-in/right-out
I.D. No. 9 (Banff National Park)	Banff	68.6	42.6	(69)	Banff Avenue – Banff, Lake Minnewanka, Tunnel Mountain	
I.D. No. 9 (Banff National Park)		81.4	50.6	Banff National Park East Gate		
M.D. of Bighorn No. 8	Harvie Heights	82.6– 83.8	51.3– 52.1	83	Harvie Heights	No eastbound entrance
Canmore		85.3	53.0	86	Bow Valley Trail	Former Highway 1A east
Canmore		85.8	53.3	(87)	Mountain Avenue	Eastbound exit and entrance
Canmore		88.2	54.8	89	Town Centre (Palliser Trail, Benchlands Trail)	
Canmore		90.1	56.0	91	Bow Valley Trail (Highway 1A east) – Exshaw	
Canmore		92.6	57.5	93	Three Sisters Parkway (Highway 742 south)	
M.D. of Bighorn No. 8	Dead Man's Flats	97.2	60.4	98	Dead Man's Flats	
M.D. of Bighorn No. 8		104.5	64.9	105	Lac des Arcs	Interchange
Kananaskis I.D.	Bow Valley Provincial Park	113.2	70.3	114	Highway 1X north / Ranch Road – Exshaw	Westbound signed as exits 114 (north) and 114A (south)
Stoney 142, 143, and 144 (Stoney-Nakoda First Nation)		117.3	72.9	118	Highway 40 south (Kananaskis Trail) – Kananaskis Country, Kananaskis Village	
Stoney 142, 143, and 144 (Stoney-Nakoda First Nation)		123.8	76.9	124	No name exit	
Stoney 142, 143, and 144 (Stoney-Nakoda First Nation)	Mînî Thnî	130.7	81.2	131	Mînî Thnî Road (Highway 133X north)	
Stoney 142, 143, and 144 (Stoney-Nakoda First Nation)		136.2	84.6	137	Bear Hill Road	
M.D. of Bighorn No. 8		140.1	87.1	Scott Lake Hill – elevation 1,410 m (4,630 ft)		
Rocky View County		142.6	88.6	143	Highway 68 south (Sibbald Creek Trail)	
Rocky View County		155.0	96.3	156	Jumping Pound Road	
Rocky View County		159.8	99.3	161	Highway 22 (Cowboy Trail) – Cochrane, Bragg Creek	
Rocky View County	Springbank	168.0	104.4	169	Range Road 33	To Calaway Park and Springbank Airport
Rocky View County		171.2	106.4	172	Old Banff Coach Road (Highway 563 east)	
City of Calgary		175.0	108.7	176	Valley Ridge Boulevard / Crestmont Boulevard	
City of Calgary		176.2	109.5	177	Stoney Trail (Highway 201) – Edmonton, Medicine Hat, Lethbridge	Highway 201 exit 36
City of Calgary		177.8	110.5	179	Canada Olympic Drive / Bowfort Road	To Canada Olympic Park
City of Calgary		179.3	111.4	(180)	Sarcee Trail / 34 Avenue NW	East end of freeway
City of Calgary		180.2	112.0	Crosses the Bow River		
City of Calgary		182.6	113.5		Shaganappi Trail / Memorial Drive / Bowness Road	Interchange
City of Calgary		183.1	113.8		West Campus Boulevard – Alberta Children's Hospital	Interchange
City of Calgary		184.1	114.4		29 Street NW / Uxbridge Drive – Foothills Medical Centre	
City of Calgary		184.6– 184.9	114.7– 114.9		University Drive / Crowchild Trail to Highway 1A west	Interchange; former Highway 1A eastern terminus; to McMahon Stadium and University of Calgary; west end of former Highway 1A concurrency
City of Calgary		185.3	115.1		Banff Trail	Eastbound access to northbound Crowchild Trail
City of Calgary		186.5	115.9		14 Street NW – Alberta University of the Arts, Jubilee Auditorium, City Centre	Former Highway 1A east; east end of former Highway 1A concurrency
City of Calgary		188.8	117.3		Centre Street N	To City Centre
City of Calgary		189.2	117.6		Edmonton Trail	
City of Calgary		191.2	118.8		Deerfoot Trail (Highway 2) – Red Deer, Fort Macleod	Highway 2 exit 258; to Calgary International Airport
City of Calgary		192.2	119.4		19 Street NE	
City of Calgary		193.0	119.9		Barlow Trail	Interchange; former Highway 2A
City of Calgary		194.4	120.8		36 Street NE	Interchange
City of Calgary		196.0	121.8		52 Street NE	Interchange
City of Calgary		197.7	122.8		68 Street NE	
City of Calgary		198.7	123.5		Stoney Trail (Highway 201) – Edmonton, Banff, Lethbridge	Interchange; Highway 201 exit 78
Rocky View County		202.0	125.5		Garden Road (100 Street NE)	
City of Chestermere		208.4	129.5		Chestermere Boulevard	Interchange; former Highway 1A west
Rocky View County		212.3	131.9		Highway 791 (Range Road 280) – Indus	
Rocky View County		218.8	136.0		Highway 9 north / Highway 797 south – Drumheller, Langdon	Interchange
Wheatland County		228.6	142.0		Highway 24 south – Cheadle, Lethbridge	
Strathmore		238.3	148.1		Wheatland Trail (Highway 817)	
Wheatland County		248.1	154.2		Highway 21 north – Rockyford, Three Hills, Drumheller	
Wheatland County		260.5	161.9		Highway 561 east – Standard, Hussar, Rosebud	
Wheatland County	Gleichen	277.9	172.7		Highway 547 south – Siksika Nation, Arrowwood	
Wheatland County	Gleichen	282.3	175.4		Highway 901 west – Siksika Nation	
Wheatland County		292.1	181.5		Highway 842 – Chancellor, Cluny, Milo	
Wheatland County		308.1	191.4		Highway 56 north / Range Road 201 south – Hussar, Drumheller	To Crowfoot Ferry
Newell County	Bassano	325.1	202.0		11th Street	Eastbound exit only
Newell County	Bassano	326.4	202.8		6th Avenue	Former Highway 847
Newell County		330.1	205.1		Highway 550 east / Township Road 212 west – Rosemary, Bassano	
Newell County		364.2	226.3		Highway 36 (Veterans Memorial Highway) – Hanna, Vauxhall, Taber	
Newell County	Brooks	372.6	231.5		2nd Street W (Highway 873) – Duchess	Interchange
Newell County	Brooks	375.8	233.5		Cassils Road (Highway 542 west)	Interchange
Newell County		385.0	239.2		Highway 875 south – Rolling Hills	
Newell County		393.4	244.4		Highway 876 – Tilley, Patricia	
Cypress County	Suffield	438.6	272.5		Highway 884 north – CFB Suffield, Ralston, Jenner	
Cypress County		465.2	289.1		Highway 524 west – Hays, Rolling Hills	
Redcliff		471.0	292.7		Mitchell Street	
Redcliff		471.9	293.2		Broadway Avenue	
City of Medicine Hat		472.9	293.8		Boundary Road	
City of Medicine Hat		475.2	295.3		Box Springs Road	Interchange
City of Medicine Hat		476.5	296.1		3 Street NW	Interchange
City of Medicine Hat		477.1	296.5	Crosses the South Saskatchewan River		
City of Medicine Hat		477.7	296.8		1 Street SW	At-grade, uncontrolled; interchange proposed
City of Medicine Hat		478.6	297.4		6 Street SW / 7 Street SW	Traffic signals; proposed intersection closure
City of Medicine Hat		479.1	297.7		Highway 3 west (Crowsnest Highway) / Highway 41A east (Gershaw Drive) – Lethbridge, City Centre	Interchange; to Medicine Hat Airport
City of Medicine Hat		479.7	298.1		16 Street SW	Traffic signals; proposed intersection closure
City of Medicine Hat		481.5	299.2		College Avenue / South Ridge Drive	Interchange
City of Medicine Hat		483.0	300.1		13 Avenue SE	Interchange
City of Medicine Hat		484.5	301.1		Dunmore Road / South Boundary Road	Interchange
Cypress County	Dunmore	491.4	305.3		Eagle Butte Road	
Cypress County		493.0	306.3		Highway 41 north (Buffalo Trail) / Township Road 120 south – Oyen	West end of Highway 41 concurrency
Cypress County		509.0	316.3		Highway 41 south (Buffalo Trail) – Elkwater, Havre	East end of Highway 41 concurrency; to Cypress Hills Interprovincial Park
Cypress County	Irvine	513.5	319.1			
Cypress County	Walsh	530.6	329.7			
Cypress County		533.8	331.7		Highway 1 (TCH) east – Swift Current, Regina	Continues into Saskatchewan
1.000 mi = 1.609 km; 1.000 km = 0.621 mi: Concurrency terminus; Incomplete access; () - Exit not officially numbered

== See also ==
- Trans-Canada Highway

Trans-Canada Highway
Previous route BC Highway 1	Highway 1	Next route SK Highway 1
