= Heart Mountain (Alberta) =

Mountain in Alberta, Canada

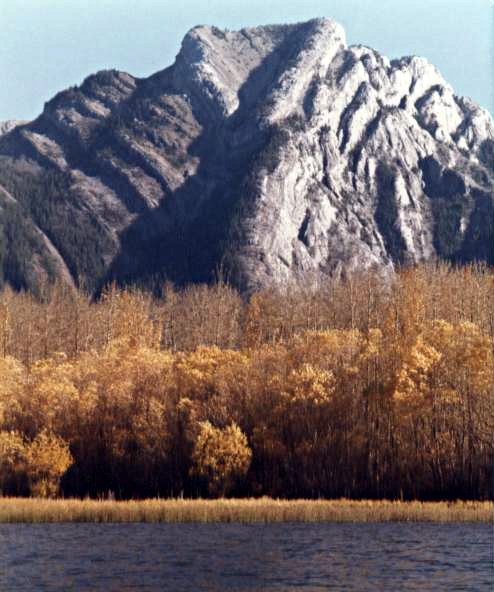
- Heart Mountain

Highest point
- Elevation: 2,135 m (7,005 ft)
- Prominence: 78 m (256 ft)
- Parent peak: Lung Peak
- Listing: List of mountains of Alberta
- Coordinates: 51°02′25″N 115°08′11″W

Geography
- Location within Alberta
- Country: Canada
- Province: Alberta
- Parent range: Canadian Rockies
- Topo map: NTS 82O3 Canmore

Climbing
- Easiest route: Scramble

Heart Mountain is a mountain located in the Bow River valley just south of Exshaw, Alberta. The peak was named in 1957 for the heart shaped layer of limestone near the top.

The summit can be reached by following the northwest ridge starting from the Heart Creek Trail. It is an easy scramble with one moderate step. Being in the front ranges and only an hour from Calgary, it sees many visitors year-round. A circuit route can be completed by following the ridge line as it circles left and then descends to Quaite Creek.

== See also ==
- List of mountains of Canada
