= Lac des Arcs, Alberta =

Lac des Arcs
- Hamlet
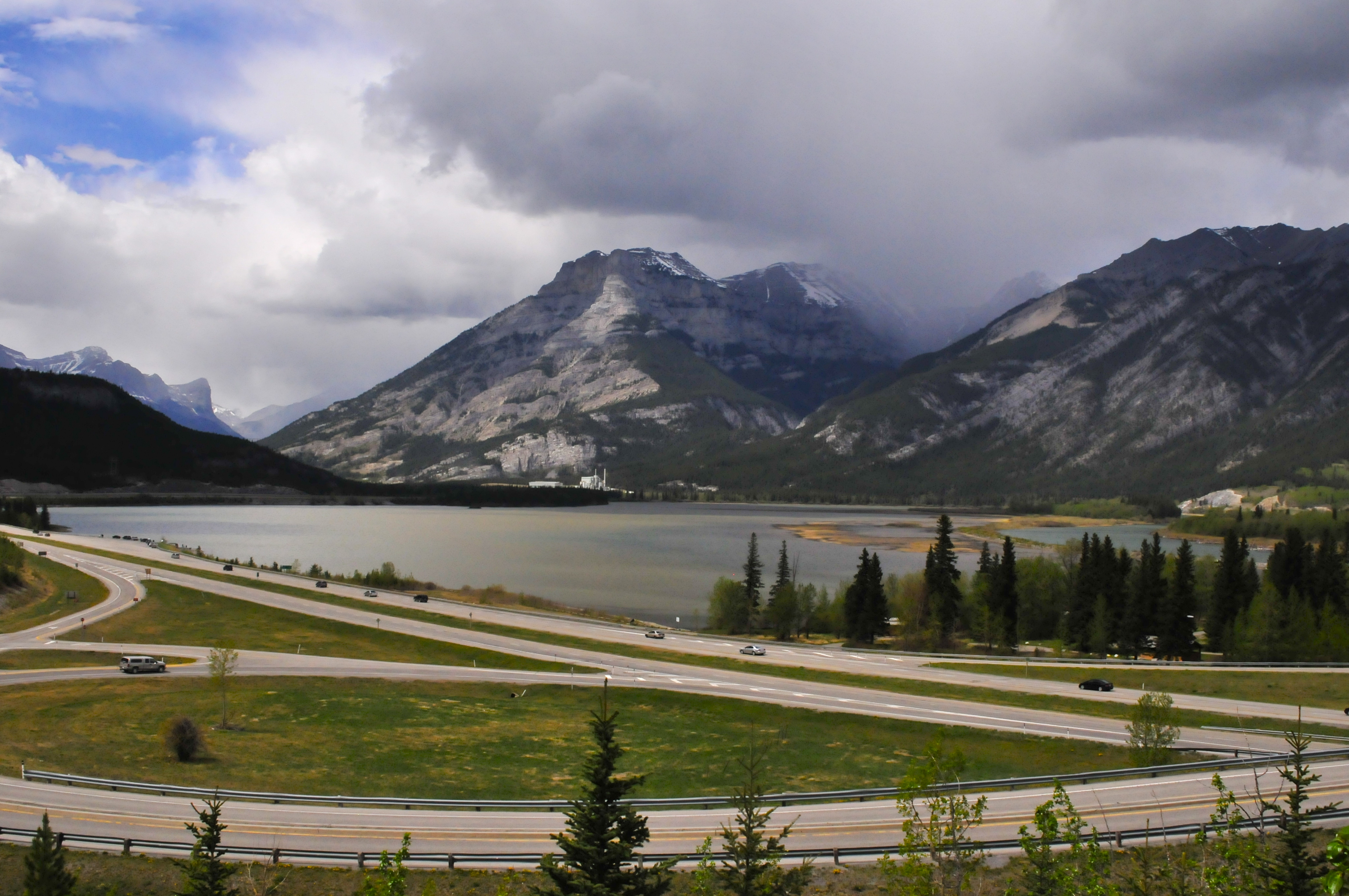
- Lac des Arcs

- Location of Lac des Arcs in Alberta
- Coordinates: 51.0517°N 115.1564°W
- Country: Canada
- Province: Alberta
- Census division: No. 15
- Municipal district: MD of Bighorn No. 8

Government
  - Type: Unincorporated
  - Governing body: MD of Bighorn No. 8 Council

Area (2021)
  - Land: 0.57 km^{2} (0.22 sq mi)
- Elevation: 1,320 m (4,330 ft)

Population (2021)
  - Total: 146
  - Density: 256.2/km^{2} (664/sq mi)
- Time zone: UTC−06:00 (Alberta Time)

Lac des Arcs is a hamlet in Alberta, Canada within the Municipal District (MD) of Bighorn No. 8. It is located on the south side of the Bow River opposite the Hamlet of Exshaw and has an elevation of 1,320 metres (4,330 ft). Highway 1 (the Trans-Canada Highway) borders Lac des Arcs on the south.

The hamlet is located in Census Division No. 15 and in the federal riding of Wild Rose.

== Lake ==
The wide span of the Bow River adjacent to the Hamlet of Lac des Arcs is also referred to as a lake under the same name, which attracts wind surfers and fishers. The Lafarge Exshaw Plant, a limestone quarry, is developed on the lake's northern shore.

== Demographics ==
Population history of Lac Des Arcs
| Year | Pop. | ±% |
|---|---|---|
| 1971 | 11 | — |
| 1976 | 47 | +327.3% |
| 1981 | 71 | +51.1% |
| 1986 | 45 | −36.6% |
| 1991 | 70 | +55.6% |
| 1996 | 82 | +17.1% |
| 2001 | 96 | +17.1% |
| 2006 | 127 | +32.3% |
| 2011 | 144 | +13.4% |
| 2016 | 130 | −9.7% |
| 2021 | 146 | +12.3% |
Source: Statistics Canada

In the 2021 Census of Population conducted by Statistics Canada, Lac Des Arcs had a population of 146 living in 57 of its 82 total private dwellings, a change of 12.3% from its 2016 population of 130. With a land area of 0.57 km^{2} (0.22 sq mi), it had a population density of 256.1/km^{2} (663.4/sq mi) in 2021.

As a designated place in the 2016 Census of Population conducted by Statistics Canada, Lac Des Arcs had a population of 130 living in 53 of its 83 total private dwellings, a change of −9.7% from its 2011 population of 144. With a land area of 0.52 km^{2} (0.20 sq mi), it had a population density of 250.0/km^{2} (647.5/sq mi) in 2016.

== See also ==
- List of communities in Alberta
- List of designated places in Alberta
- List of hamlets in Alberta
