= Dead Man's Flats =

Hamlet located in Alberta

Dead Man's Flats Pigeon Mountain
- Hamlet
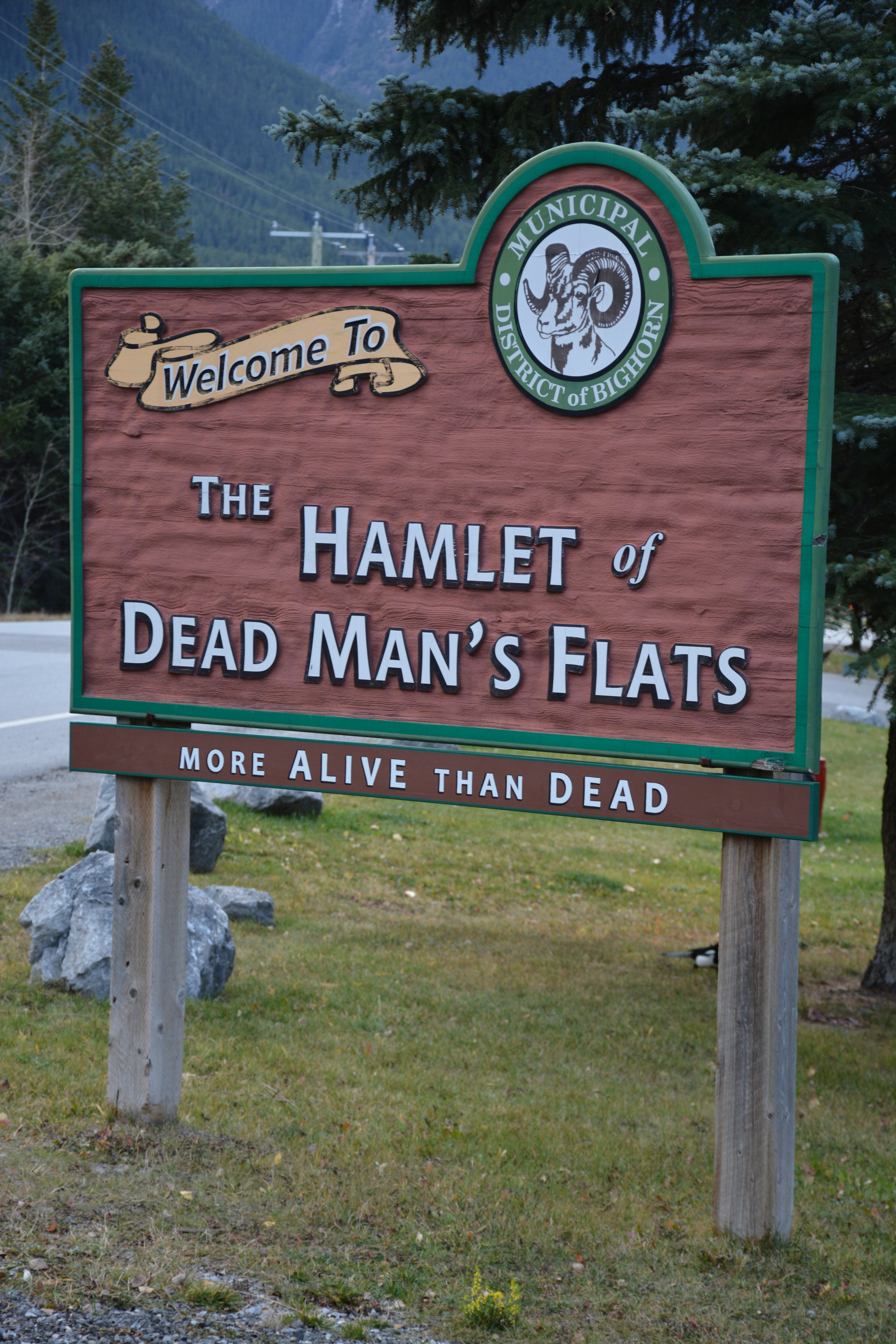
- Welcome sign

- Location of Pigeon Mountain Dead Man's Flats (Canada)
- Coordinates: 51°2′24″N 115°15′50″W
- Country: Canada
- Province: Alberta
- Region: Alberta's Rockies
- Census division: 15
- Municipal district: Municipal District of Bighorn No. 8

Government
  - Reeve: Lisa Rosvold
  - Governing body: Municipal District of Bighorn council: Jen Smith; Steve Fitzmorris; Lisa Rosvold; Alice James; Rick Tuza
  - CAO: Shaina Tutt
  - MP: Blake Richards (CPC)
  - MLA: Sarah Elmeligi (NDP)

Area (2021)
  - Land: 1.23 km^{2} (0.47 sq mi)

Population (2021)
  - Total: 377
  - Density: 305.9/km^{2} (792/sq mi)
- Time zone: UTC−06:00 (Alberta Time)
- Forward sortation area: T1W
- Area codes: +1 403, +1 587, +1 825
- Highways: Highway 1 (TCH) Trans-Canada Highway; Highway 1A; Highway 742
- Waterways: Bow River

Dead Man's Flats is a hamlet within the Municipal District of Bighorn No. 8. Statistics Canada also recognizes it as a designated place under the name of Pigeon Mountain. It is located within Alberta's Rockies at Highway 1 exit 98, approximately 7 kilometres (4.3 mi) southeast of Canmore and 78 kilometres (48 mi) west of Calgary.

== History ==
A variety of explanations account for the origin of the hamlet's name. One explanation associates it with a murder which took place in 1904 at a dairy farm situated on the flats of the Bow River. Francois Marret stood trial in Calgary for killing his brother Jean, whose body he had disposed of in the Bow River, but the jury acquitted him by reason of insanity. Another account states that two or three First Nations people who were trapping beaver in violation of colonial game regulations noticed a warden approaching in the distance. Knowing that they did not have time to flee without being spotted, they smeared themselves with beaver blood and pretended to be dead. The warden, fooled by their deception, ran for help. Meanwhile, the trappers took their beaver pelts and escaped. This account is regarded as dubious; for example, no known description of this incident appears in the official wardens' reports.

In 1954, the Calgary Herald wrote that it was "named only 10 to 12 years ago after a man was found shot in a cabin in the area." However, the phrase "Dead Man's flat" (lower-case "f" without the plural "s" at the end) is used in the August 25th, 1924 edition of the Calgary Herald. In an article that describes some recent events in Canmore it is stated that "A party of Canmore boys...returned last week from a seven days' outing at Dead Man's flat." They went on the outing for the purpose of fishing.

From 1974 to 1985 the hamlet was officially called Pigeon Mountain Service Centre, but it changed its name to Dead Man's Flats in 1985 to encourage tourism. The new name had been unofficially used to designate the hamlet for several decades prior.

Before the Trans-Canada highway was constructed through the area in the 1950s, it was sparsely populated Crown land; among the only structures in the area were a corral and a camper's cabin. Proximity to the new national highway spurred the hamlet's development as a commercial service centre and rest stop for travelers and truck drivers.

In the 2010s, the area was the subject of proposed developments which would involve the construction of a new residential neighbourhood and a light industrial park.

There is a CSA-standard playground in the River's Bend subdivision. The community sets up and maintains a temporary outdoor ice surface during winter in River's Bend. An asphalt-surfaced trail runs along the south and west boundaries of Pigeon Creek Condominiums.

== Demographics ==
Population history of Dead Man's Flats
Year	Pop.	±%
1971	41	—
1981	33	−19.5%
1986	29	−12.1%
1991	35	+20.7%
1996	55	+57.1%
2001	89	+61.8%
2006	82	−7.9%
2006A	72	−12.2%
2011	121	+68.1%
2016	125	+3.3%
2021	377	+201.6%
Source: Statistics Canada

In the 2021 Census of Population conducted by Statistics Canada, Dead Man’s Flats had a population of 377 living in 128 of its 162 total private dwellings, a change of 201.6% from its 2016 population of 125. With a land area of 1.23 km^{2} (0.47 sq mi), it had a population density of 306.5/km^{2} (793.8/sq mi) in 2021.

As a designated place in the 2016 Census of Population conducted by Statistics Canada, Dead Man’s Flats (Pigeon Mountain) had a population of 125 living in 57 of its 96 total private dwellings, a change of 3.3% from its 2011 population of 121. With a land area of 1.07 km^{2} (0.41 sq mi), it had a population density of 116.8/km^{2} (302.6/sq mi) in 2016.

== See also ==
- List of communities in Alberta
- List of designated places in Alberta
- List of hamlets in Alberta
