= Benchlands =

- Hamlet
- Location of Benchlands Benchlands (Canada)
- Coordinates: 51°17′03″N 114°48′16″W
- Country: Canada
- Province: Alberta
- Region: Alberta's Rockies
- Census division: 15
- Municipal district: Municipal District of Bighorn No. 8

Government
  - Type: Unincorporated
  - Governing body: Municipal District of Bighorn No. 8 Council

Area (2021)
  - Land: 0.41 km^{2} (0.16 sq mi)

Population (2021)
  - Total: 59
  - Density: 145.1/km^{2} (376/sq mi)
- Time zone: UTC−06:00 (Alberta Time)
- Area codes: 403, 587, 825

Benchlands is a hamlet in Alberta within the Municipal District of Bighorn No. 8. The Ghost River is located on the hamlet's south side, while Highway 40 borders the north side.

== Demographics ==
Population history of Benchlands
| Year | Pop. | ±% |
|---|---|---|
| 1971 | 38 | — |
| 1976 | 36 | −5.3% |
| 1981 | 38 | +5.6% |
| 1986 | 35 | −7.9% |
| 1991 | 50 | +42.9% |
| 1996 | 44 | −12.0% |
| 2001 | 47 | +6.8% |
| 2006 | 49 | +4.3% |
| 2011 | 42 | −14.3% |
| 2016 | 43 | +2.4% |
| 2021 | 59 | +37.2% |
Source: Statistics Canada

In the 2021 Census of Population conducted by Statistics Canada, Benchlands had a population of 59 living in 26 of its 34 total private dwellings, a change of 37.2% from its 2016 population of 43. With a land area of 0.41 km^{2} (0.16 sq mi), it had a population density of 143.9/km^{2} (372.7/sq mi) in 2021.

As a designated place in the 2016 Census of Population conducted by Statistics Canada, Benchlands had a population of 43 living in 19 of its 30 total private dwellings, a change of 2.4% from its 2011 population of 42. With a land area of 0.41 km^{2} (0.16 sq mi), it had a population density of 104.9/km^{2} (271.6/sq mi) in 2016.

== See also ==
- List of communities in Alberta
- List of designated places in Alberta
- List of hamlets in Alberta
