= Lake Louise, Alberta =

Lake Louise
- Unincorporated community
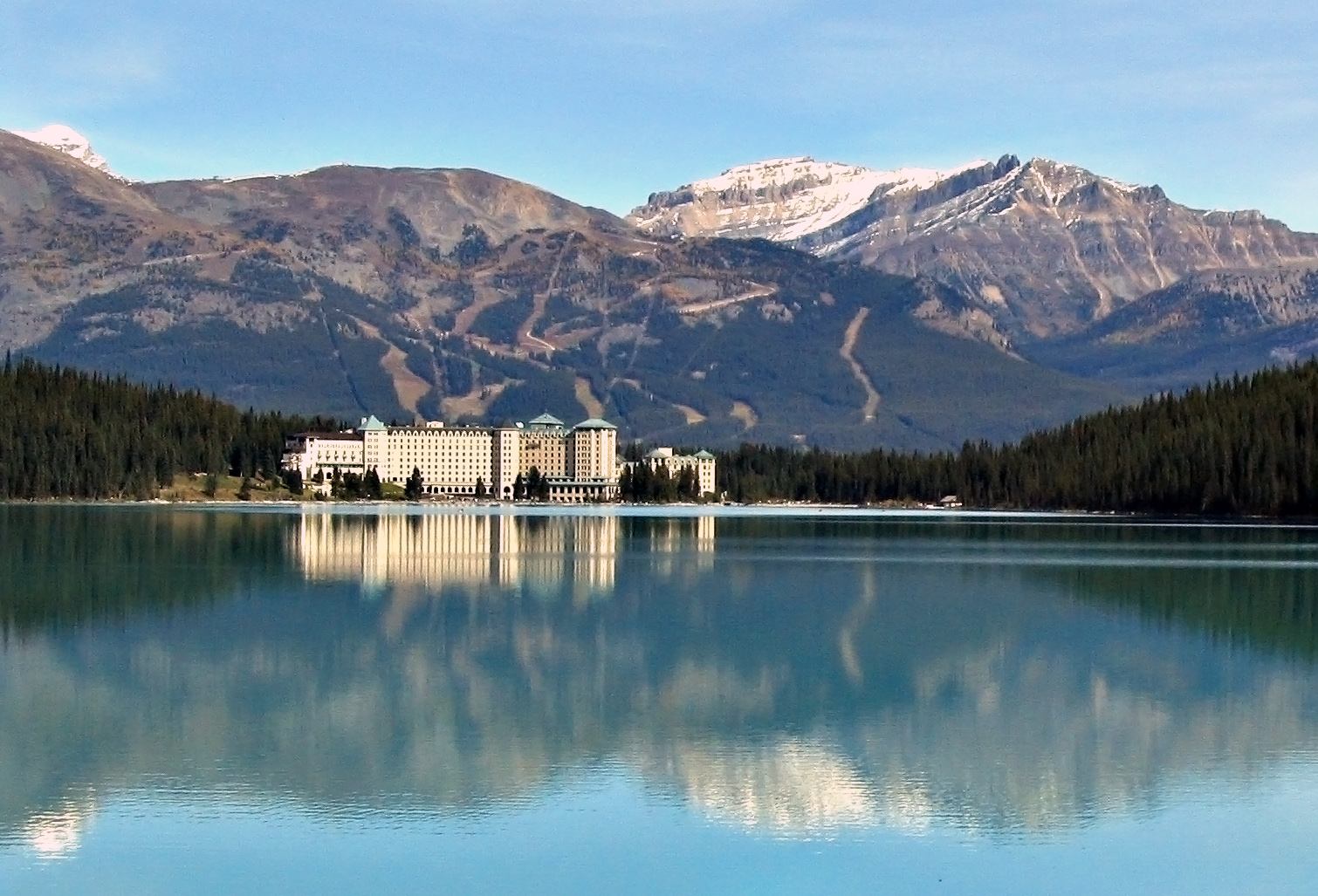
- Chateau Lake Louise and Lake Louise Ski Resort behind Lake Louise

- Location of Lake Louise in Alberta Lake Louise (Canada)
- Coordinates: 51°25′31″N 116°10′50″W
- Country: Canada
- Province: Alberta
- Region: Alberta's Rockies
- Census division: No. 15
- Improvement district: Improvement District No. 9

Government
  - Type: Unincorporated
  - Governing body: Improvement District No. 9 Council
  - MP: William Stevenson (C)
  - MLA: Sarah Elmeligi (NDP)
- Elevation: 1,600 m (5,200 ft)

Population (2011)
  - Total: 691
- Time zone: UTC−06:00 (Alberta Time)
- Postal code span: T0L 1E0
- Area codes: 403, 587
- Highways: Highway 1 (TCH)
- Waterways: Bow River
- Public transit service: Roam

Lake Louise is an unincorporated community within Banff National Park in Alberta, Canada. Named after Princess Louise, Duchess of Argyll, it lies in the Rocky Mountains on the Bow River, 3 km (1.9 mi) northeast of the lake that shares its name. Initially settled in 1884 as an outpost for the Canadian Pacific Railway, Lake Louise sits at an elevation of 1,600 m (5,200 ft), and is Canada's highest community.

== History ==
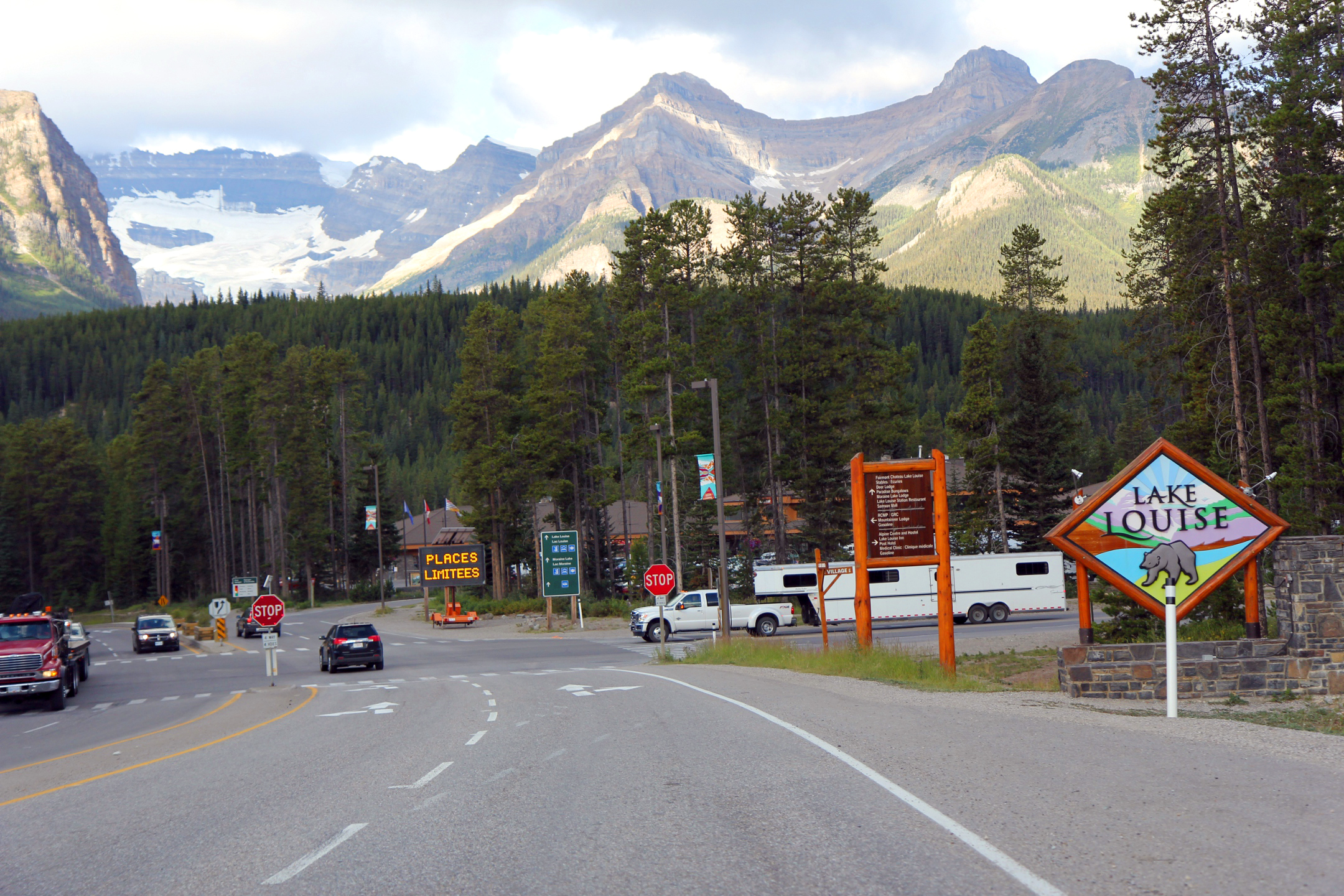
Entryway to Lake Louise

Prior to the arrival of Europeans, local indigenous peoples were the only inhabitants of the foothills of the Rocky Mountains—including what is today Lake Louise—where they hunted the once-widespread bison, as well as elk, moose and other big and small game animals, in addition to fishing the rich waterways and foraging off of the many species of edible and medicinal plants in the region. In the language of the Nakoda people, Lake Louise is called Ho-run-num-nay, meaning "lake of the little fishes".

During the 1870s, construction of the Canadian Pacific Railway (CPR) began, with the route going through Bow Valley. A Nakoda guide took CPR workman Tom Wilson to the site in 1882, and Wilson named it 'Emerald Lake'. The community was later called 'Holt City', and then 'Laggan', before being renamed Lake Louise. A ca. 1890 CPR station was replaced in 1910, but continued to be used by the railway company for other purposes until it was donated to Heritage Park Historical Village, Calgary, in 1976. The depot was moved to the park, where it was restored in the style of the era when the village was called Laggan. The 1910 station was declared a heritage railway station by the federal government in 1991, having been well-preserved and operating today as a restaurant.

Lake Louise was added to Rocky Mountains Park in 1892, and has subsequently become an international tourist destination, made more accessible by its location near the Trans-Canada Highway.

== Geography ==
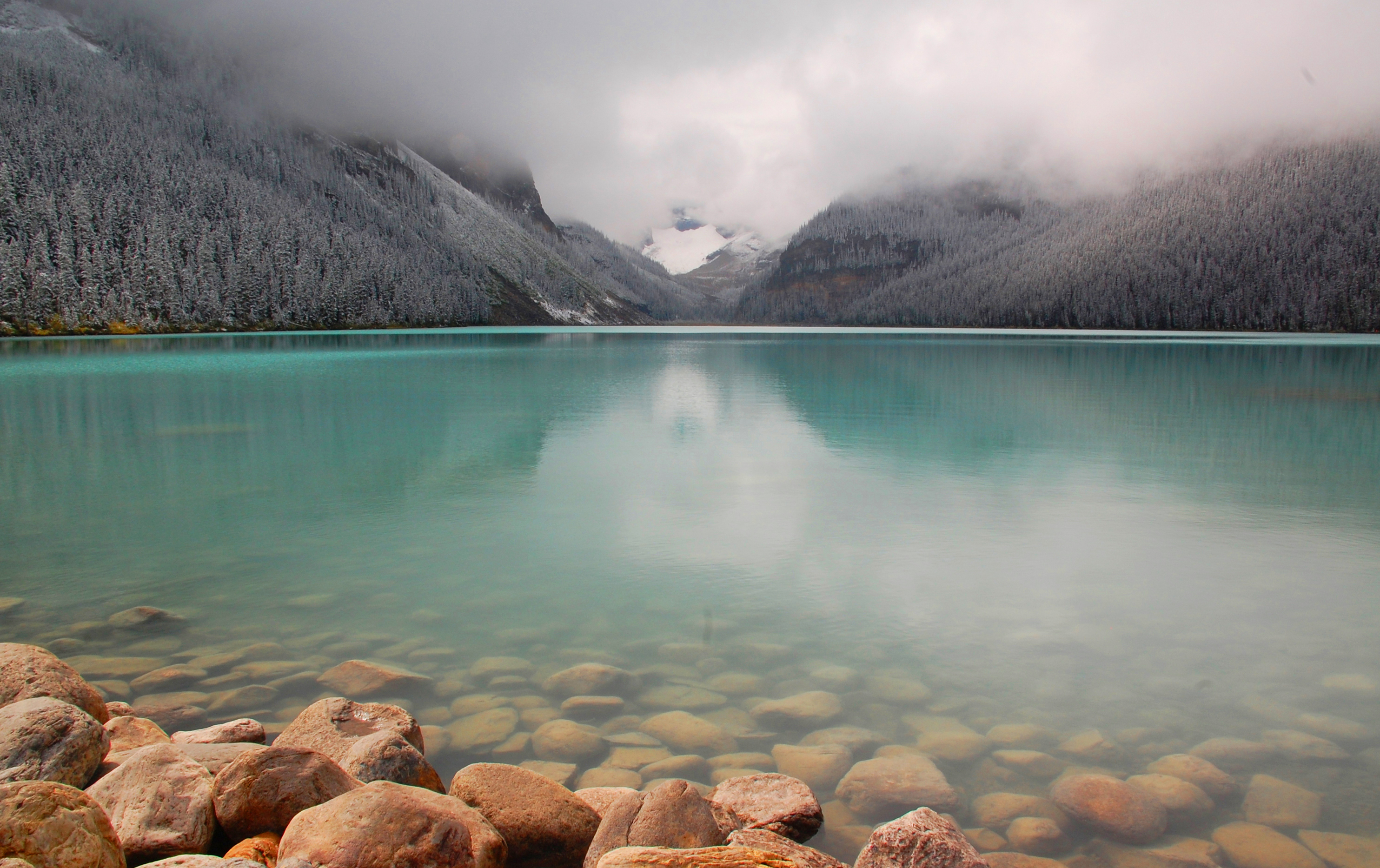
The nearby eponymous lake in September 2014

The community is in Division No. 15, one of 19 census divisions of Alberta and the federal riding of Banff—Airdrie. It is beside the Trans-Canada Highway (Highway 1), 180 km (110 mi) west of Calgary.

=== Climate ===
Lake Louise experiences a subarctic climate (Köppen climate classification Dfc). Annual snowfall averages 279.1 cm (109.9 in) and although winter temperatures can fall below −50 °C (−58 °F) in January and February the averages are −18.4 °C (−1.1 °F) and −17.6 °C (0.3 °F) respectively. Summers consist of frosty mornings and crisp, cool days. Snow can occur in any month of the year. Since lower elevations on said latitude have humid continental climates instead, it may also be described as a subalpine climate. Because of its high diurnal air temperature variation and high altitude, the frost-free period averages only 14 days.

Climate data for Lake Louise Climate ID: 3034480; coordinates 51°26′N 116°13′W; elevation: 1,524 m (5,000 ft); 1981−2010 normals
Month	Jan	Feb	Mar	Apr	May	Jun	Jul	Aug	Sep	Oct	Nov	Dec	Year
Record high °C (°F)	7.8 (46.0)	13.9 (57.0)	17.0 (62.6)	26.5 (79.7)	31.7 (89.1)	31.1 (88.0)	34.4 (93.9)	32.2 (90.0)	29.0 (84.2)	26.1 (79.0)	18.3 (64.9)	12.2 (54.0)	34.4 (93.9)
Mean daily maximum °C (°F)	−5.4 (22.3)	−1.7 (28.9)	2.9 (37.2)	7.5 (45.5)	12.7 (54.9)	16.7 (62.1)	20.4 (68.7)	20.1 (68.2)	14.7 (58.5)	7.3 (45.1)	−1.7 (28.9)	−6.9 (19.6)	7.2 (45.0)
Daily mean °C (°F)	−12.0 (10.4)	−9.7 (14.5)	−4.7 (23.5)	0.9 (33.6)	5.8 (42.4)	9.7 (49.5)	12.6 (54.7)	11.9 (53.4)	7.1 (44.8)	1.1 (34.0)	−7.1 (19.2)	−13.0 (8.6)	0.2 (32.4)
Mean daily minimum °C (°F)	−18.4 (−1.1)	−17.6 (0.3)	−12.3 (9.9)	−5.8 (21.6)	−1.2 (29.8)	2.8 (37.0)	4.7 (40.5)	3.6 (38.5)	−0.5 (31.1)	−5.1 (22.8)	−12.6 (9.3)	−19.1 (−2.4)	−6.8 (19.8)
Record low °C (°F)	−52.8 (−63.0)	−50.6 (−59.1)	−44.4 (−47.9)	−33.9 (−29.0)	−27.8 (−18.0)	−10.0 (14.0)	−7.0 (19.4)	−7.5 (18.5)	−25.0 (−13.0)	−32.0 (−25.6)	−44.0 (−47.2)	−49.4 (−56.9)	−52.8 (−63.0)
Average precipitation mm (inches)	52.4 (2.06)	47.9 (1.89)	37.3 (1.47)	32.3 (1.27)	59.9 (2.36)	54.3 (2.14)	56.4 (2.22)	53.9 (2.12)	41.9 (1.65)	37.7 (1.48)	57.4 (2.26)	48.7 (1.92)	543.8 (21.41)
Average rainfall mm (inches)	0.7 (0.03)	0.0 (0.0)	1.5 (0.06)	9.0 (0.35)	32.8 (1.29)	54.1 (2.13)	56.4 (2.22)	53.6 (2.11)	39.1 (1.54)	19.0 (0.75)	2.4 (0.09)	0.0 (0.0)	268.7 (10.58)
Average snowfall cm (inches)	51.3 (20.2)	33.4 (13.1)	36.4 (14.3)	23.5 (9.3)	7.1 (2.8)	0.2 (0.1)	0.0 (0.0)	0.0 (0.0)	2.8 (1.1)	18.7 (7.4)	57.0 (22.4)	48.8 (19.2)	279.1 (109.9)
Average precipitation days (≥ 0.2 mm)	12.0	8.1	9.9	8.2	13.3	16.5	14.9	14.2	11.6	11.3	12.5	11.5	143.9
Average rainy days (≥ 0.2 mm)	0.1	0.0	0.38	2.6	11.9	16.5	14.9	14.2	11.2	6.1	0.5	0.0	78.3
Average snowy days (≥ 0.2 cm)	11.9	8.1	9.8	6.0	2.2	0.1	0.0	0.0	0.93	6.0	12.1	11.5	68.5
Source: Environment and Climate Change Canada

== Demographics ==
Population history of Lake Louise
Year	Pop.	±%
1941	172	—
1951	175	+1.7%
1956	56	−68.0%
1961	178	+217.9%
1966	121	−32.0%
1971	165	+36.4%
1976	140	−15.2%
1981	355	+153.6%
1986	688	+93.8%
1991	500	−27.3%
2011	691	+38.2%
Source: Statistics Canada

Lake Louise recorded a population of 691 in the 2011 Census of Population conducted by Statistics Canada. Residents often change year to year, with workers in the service and tourism industries moving to the area for work.

== Government ==
Lake Louise is administered by Improvement District No. 9.

== Infrastructure ==
The Trans-Canada Highway (Highway 1) runs adjacent to the community while Highway 1A begins at the entrance to the community. The southern terminus of the Icefields Parkway (Highway 93) is just north of the community.

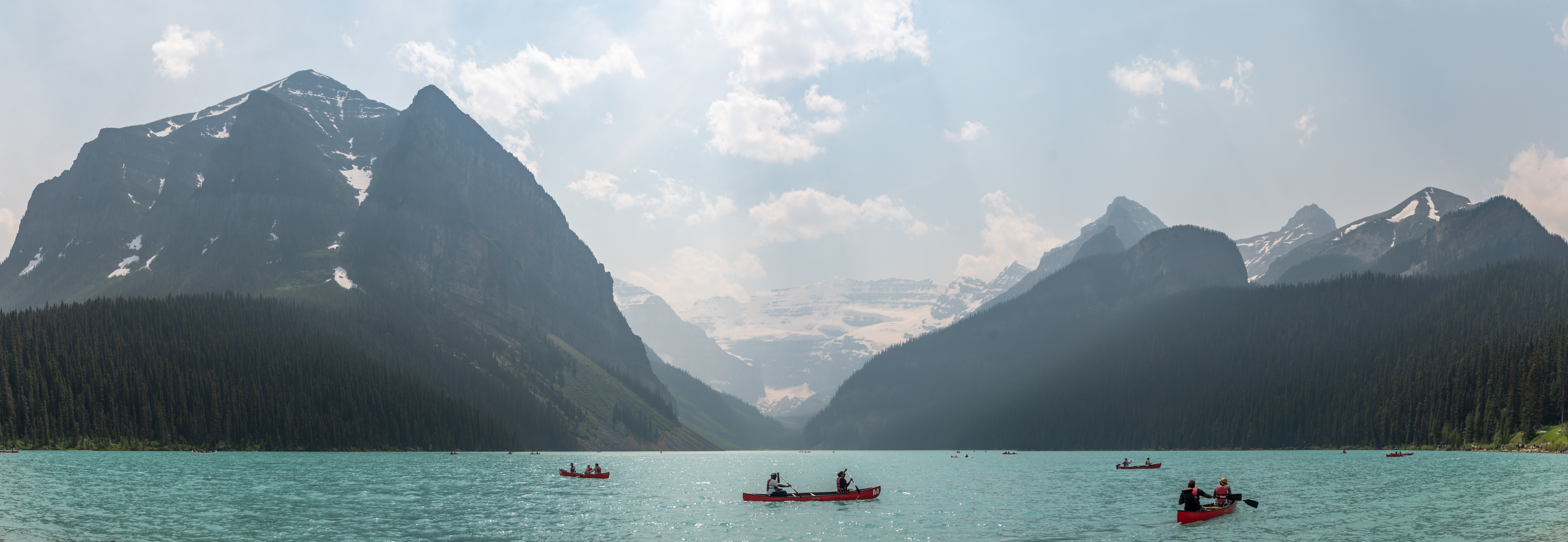
Lake Louise, with which the community shares its name, pictured in July 2026

== See also ==
- List of communities in Alberta
- List of communities in Canada by elevation
- Royal eponyms in Canada
