= Alberta's Rockies =

Rocky Mountains in Alberta, Canada

Coordinates: 52.0°N 116.5°W

Alberta's Rockies comprise the Canadian Rocky Mountains in Alberta, Canada. On the southwestern part of the province along the British Columbia border, the region covers all but the south of Census Division 15.

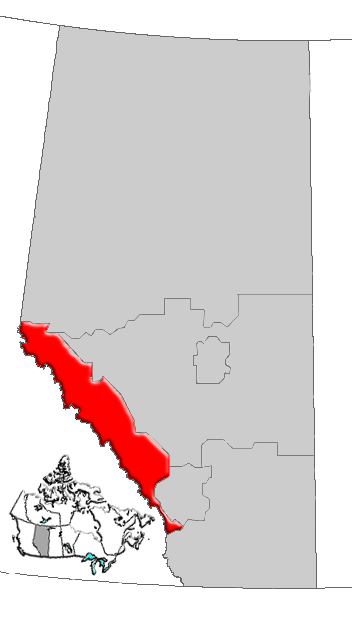

The main industry in this region is tourism.

== Geography ==
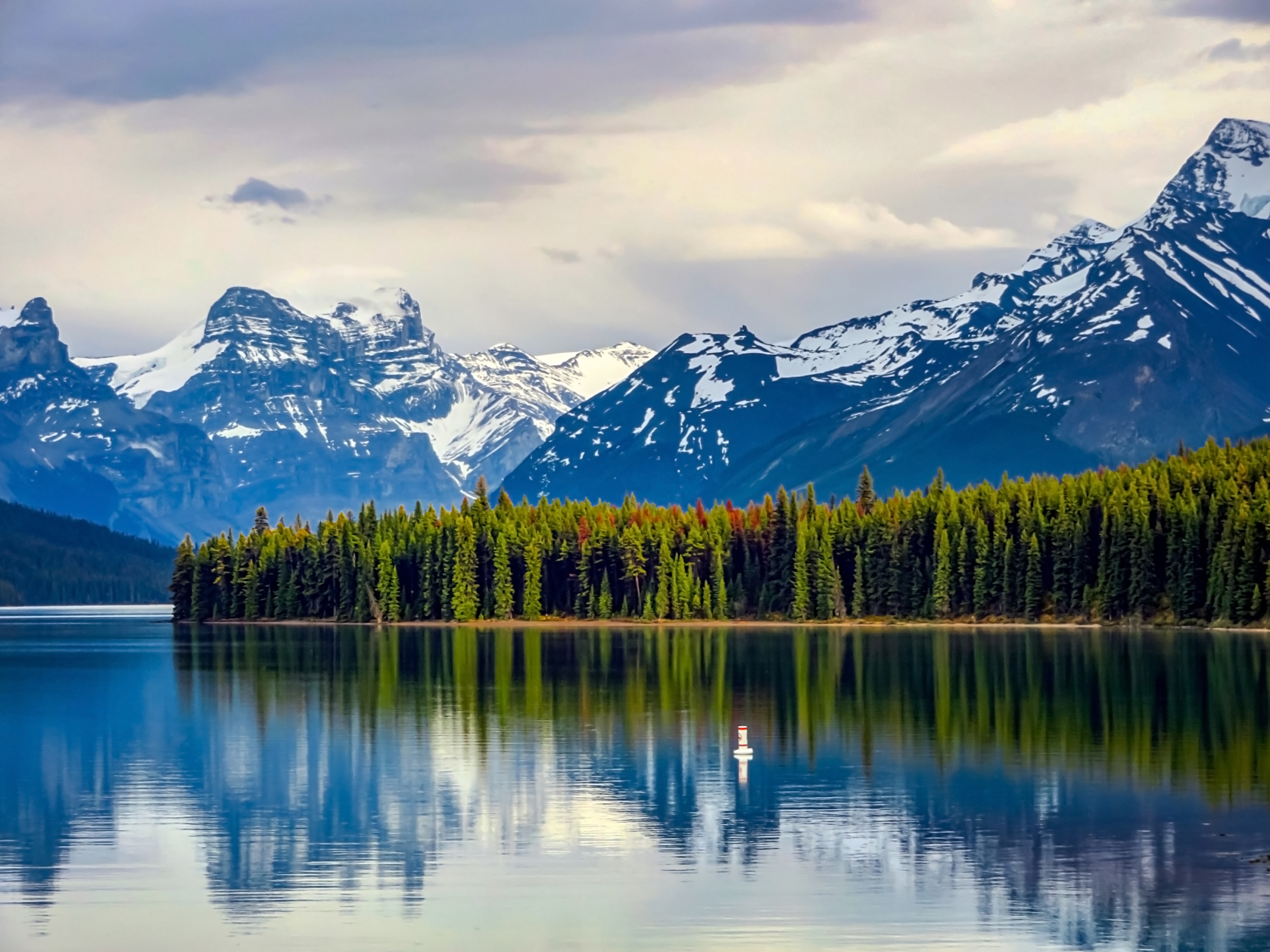
Maligne Lake in Jasper National Park

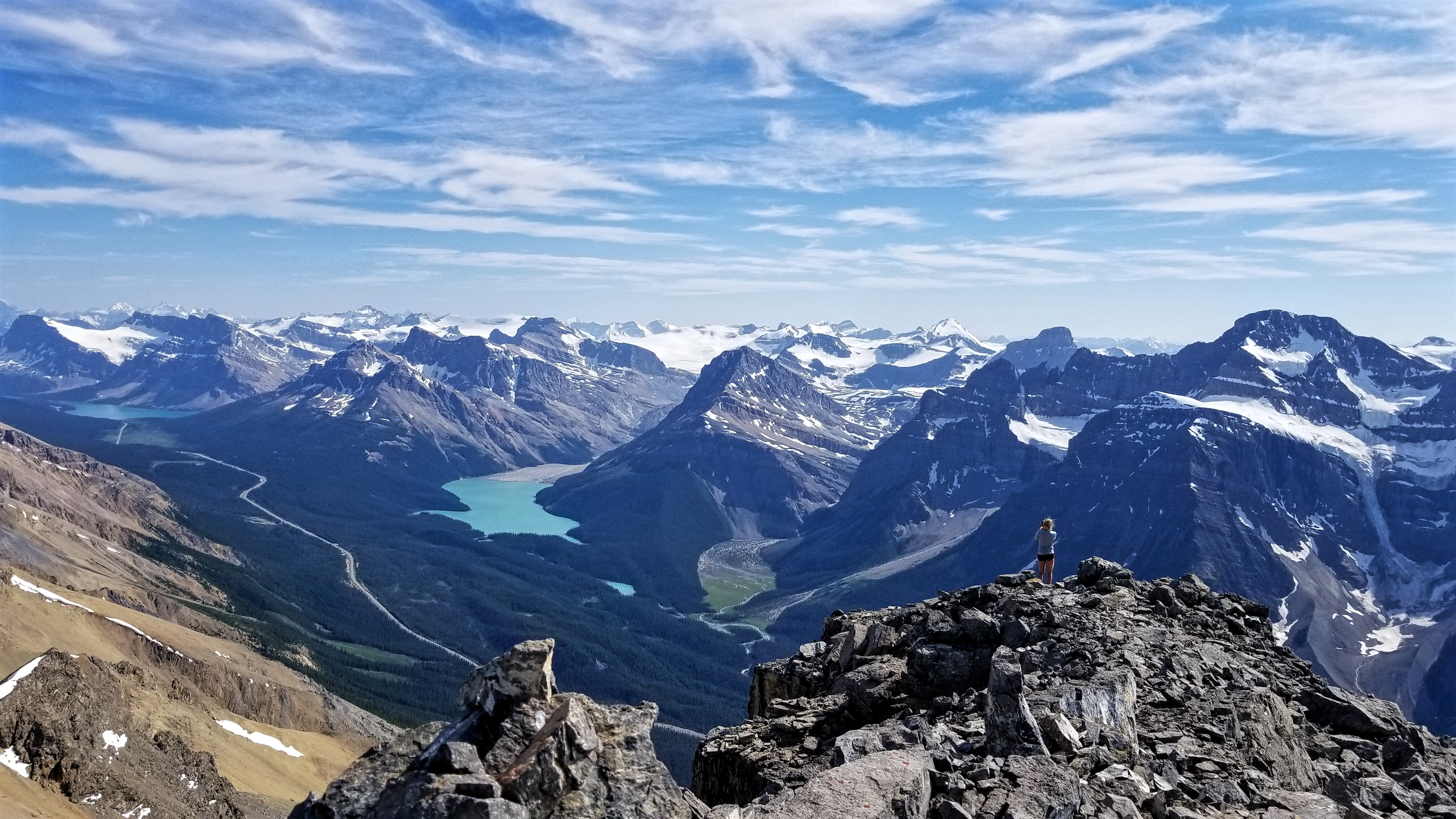
View on the Icefields Parkway in Banff National Park

This human region is almost identical to the Alberta Mountain forests ecozone. The region contains the Central Front Ranges and the Continental Ranges of the Canadian Rocky Mountains, and includes the Banff National Park and Jasper National Park, as well as the Kananaskis Country park system and the Willmore Wilderness.

The main transportation corridors run through the Kicking Horse Pass and the Yellowhead Pass from east to west, while the Bow Valley and Athabasca River valley are followed by the longitudinal Icefields Parkway. Another important waterway that crosses this region is the North Saskatchewan River.

=== Tourism ===
Some of the best ski resorts of the Rockies are in this region, and are important tourist destinations. They include Fortress Mountain Resort, Lake Louise, Marmot Basin, Mount Norquay, Nakiska and Sunshine Village. Other tourist attractions include the glaciers of the Columbia, Wapta and Waputik Icefields such as the Athabasca, Bow, Crowfoot, Hector, Peyto, Saskatchewan and Vulture Glaciers.

Glacial lakes line the Icefields Parkway and dot the surrounding valleys. Some of the more spectacular are Bow, Hector, Louise, Maligne, Moraine, Peyto, Pyramid and Vermilion lakes.

== Infrastructure ==
Banff and Jasper are the main communities in the region. The length is defined by the Icefields Parkway, and it is crossed by the Trans-Canada Highway and the Yellowhead Highway into British Columbia. David Thompson Highway leads from the Rockies into central Alberta from Saskatchewan River Crossing, and Banff Windermere Parkway leads from Castle Junction (south of Lake Louise) through the Kootenay National Park to the Columbia River valley. The Bighorn Highway defines most of the eastern limit of the region.

Health care has been the responsibility of Alberta Health Services, since the province's health regions were amalgamated in 2008. Before then, Calgary Health Region was the health region ensuring well-being in the south of this region, while the north was supervised by the Aspen Regional Health Authority.

Health care centres established in the area are:

- Seton Jasper Healthcare Centre - Jasper
- Hinton Healthcare Centre - Hinton
- Canmore General Hospital - Canmore
- Banff Mineral Springs Hospital - Banff

== Politics ==
On a provincial level, southern Alberta is represented in the Legislative Assembly of Alberta by Members of the Legislative Assembly elected in the ridings of Banff-Cochrane and part of Rocky Mountain House and West Yellowhead.

== Communities ==
The following communities are in Alberta's Rockies.

- Towns of Banff and Canmore
- Municipality of Jasper (specialized municipality)
- Summer villages of Ghost Lake and Waiparous
- Hamlets of Lake Louise, Harvie Heights, Exshaw, Dead Man's Flats and Lac des Arcs
- Saskatchewan River Crossing (unincorporated community)
- Kananaskis Village (resort community)

The towns of Grande Cache and Hinton, on the eastern edge of the Rockies, are sometimes considered as part of this region.

The following rural municipalities are in Alberta's Rockies.

- Municipal District of Bighorn No. 8
- Improvement District No. 9 (Banff National Park)
- Improvement District No. 12 (Jasper National Park)
- Improvement District No. 25 (Willmore Wilderness Park)
- Kananaskis Improvement District

== See also ==
- List of regions of Canada
