= Ghost Lake, Alberta =

Ghost Lake
- Summer village
- Summer Village of Ghost Lake
- Location of Ghost Lake in Alberta
- Coordinates: 51.20775°N 114.76434°W
- Country: Canada
- Province: Alberta
- Census division: No. 15

Government
  - Type: Municipal incorporation
  - Mayor: John Walsh
  - Governing body: Ghost Lake Summer Village Council

Area (2021)
  - Land: 0.62 km^{2} (0.24 sq mi)
- Elevation: 1,417 m (4,649 ft)

Population (2021)
  - Total: 82
  - Density: 132.6/km^{2} (343/sq mi)
- Time zone: UTC−06:00 (Alberta Time)
- Website: Official website

Ghost Lake is a summer village in Alberta, Canada. It is located between the Bow Valley Trail and the northern shore of the Ghost Lake Reservoir in the Municipal District of Bighorn No. 8. It is 23 km (14 mi) west of Cochrane.

== Geography ==
=== Climate ===
Climate data for Ghost Lake
Month	Jan	Feb	Mar	Apr	May	Jun	Jul	Aug	Sep	Oct	Nov	Dec	Year
Record high °C (°F)	15 (59)	18.5 (65.3)	18.5 (65.3)	29.5 (85.1)	30 (86)	30 (86)	33 (91)	32.8 (91.0)	31.7 (89.1)	27.5 (81.5)	19.4 (66.9)	16 (61)	33 (91)
Mean daily maximum °C (°F)	−1.9 (28.6)	0.4 (32.7)	3.8 (38.8)	9 (48)	13.8 (56.8)	17.9 (64.2)	20.4 (68.7)	20.1 (68.2)	15.4 (59.7)	10.8 (51.4)	2.4 (36.3)	−1 (30)	9.3 (48.7)
Mean daily minimum °C (°F)	−16.3 (2.7)	−14.1 (6.6)	−10.3 (13.5)	−4.9 (23.2)	−0.4 (31.3)	3.2 (37.8)	5 (41)	4.3 (39.7)	−0.1 (31.8)	−4 (25)	−10.6 (12.9)	−14.7 (5.5)	−5.3 (22.5)
Record low °C (°F)	−42 (−44)	−48 (−54)	−38 (−36)	−26.5 (−15.7)	−12 (10)	−6 (21)	−5 (23)	−6.5 (20.3)	−17 (1)	−34.5 (−30.1)	−40.5 (−40.9)	−42.5 (−44.5)	−48 (−54)
Average precipitation mm (inches)	16.7 (0.66)	18.5 (0.73)	29.9 (1.18)	38.4 (1.51)	69.9 (2.75)	85.9 (3.38)	80.7 (3.18)	78.4 (3.09)	50.7 (2.00)	22 (0.9)	20.2 (0.80)	17 (0.7)	528 (20.8)
Source: Environment Canada

== Demographics ==
In the 2021 Census of Population conducted by Statistics Canada, the Summer Village of Ghost Lake had a population of 82 living in 40 of its 91 total private dwellings, a change of 0% from its 2016 population of 82. With a land area of 0.62 km^{2} (0.24 sq mi), it had a population density of 132.3/km^{2} (342.5/sq mi) in 2021.

In the 2016 Census of Population conducted by Statistics Canada, the Summer Village of Ghost Lake had a population of 82 living in 36 of its 87 total private dwellings, a 1.2% change from its 2011 population of 81. With a land area of 0.67 km^{2} (0.26 sq mi), it had a population density of 122.4/km^{2} (317.0/sq mi) in 2016.

== See also ==
- List of communities in Alberta
- List of summer villages in Alberta
- List of resort villages in Saskatchewan
