= Municipal District of Bighorn No. 8 =

Municipal district in Alberta, Canada

- Municipal district
- Seal

- Location within Alberta
- Country: Canada
- Province: Alberta
- Region: Calgary Region
- Census division: 15
- Incorporated: 1988

Government
  - Reeve: Lisa Rosvold
  - Governing body: M.D. of Bighorn Council
  - Administrative office: Exshaw

Area (2021)
  - Land: 2,678.8 km^{2} (1,034.3 sq mi)

Population (2021)
  - Total: 1,598
  - Density: 0.6/km^{2} (1.6/sq mi)
- Time zone: UTC−06:00 (Alberta Time)
- Website: mdbighorn.ca

The Municipal District of Bighorn No. 8 is a municipal district (MD) situated in Census Division No. 15 of Alberta, Canada. It is located between Calgary and Banff National Park, north of Kananaskis Improvement District. Highway 1 (the Trans-Canada Highway) passes through the municipal district.

It was created as a municipal district on January 1, 1988 from the former Improvement District No. 8. The Town of Canmore lies adjacent to the municipal district to the southwest.

== Communities and localities ==
The following urban municipalities are surrounded by the MD of Bighorn No. 8.

Cities

- none

Towns

- Canmore

Villages

- none

Summer villages

- Ghost Lake
- Waiparous

First Nations settlements

- Mînî Thnî

The following hamlets are located within the MD of Bighorn No. 8.

Hamlets

- Benchlands
- Dead Man's Flats or Pigeon Mountain (designated place)
- Exshaw
- Harvie Heights
- Lac des Arcs

The following localities are located within the MD of Bighorn No. 8.

Localities

- Gap
- Improvement District No. 8
- Jumping Pound (Forest Res)
- Kananaskis
- Spray Lakes

== Demographics ==
In the 2021 Census of Population conducted by Statistics Canada, the MD of Bighorn No. 8 had a population of 1,598 living in 640 of its 875 total private dwellings, a change of 20.7% from its 2016 population of 1,324. With a land area of 2,678.8 km^{2} (1,034.3 sq mi), it had a population density of 0.6/km^{2} (1.5/sq mi) in 2021.

In the 2016 Census of Population conducted by Statistics Canada, the MD of Bighorn No. 8 had a population of 1,334 living in 556 of its 766 total private dwellings, a −0.5% change from its 2011 population of 1,341. With a land area of 2,761.18 km^{2} (1,066.10 sq mi), it had a population density of 0.5/km^{2} (1.3/sq mi) in 2016.

== See also ==
- List of communities in Alberta
- List of francophone communities in Alberta
- List of municipal districts in Alberta
