= Division No. 15, Alberta =

Census division in Canada

Coordinates: 51°05′24″N 115°21′00″W

Division No. 15
- Census division in Alberta
- Country: Canada
- Province: Alberta

Area
  - Total: 28,400 km^{2} (11,000 sq mi)

Population (2021)
  - Total: 37,735
  - Density: 1.33/km^{2} (3.44/sq mi)

Division No. 15 is a census division in Alberta, Canada. The majority of the division is located in Alberta's Rockies, while the southernmost portion of the division is located within southern Alberta. The division's largest urban community is the Town of Canmore.

== Census subdivisions ==
The following census subdivisions (municipalities or municipal equivalents) are located within Alberta's Division No. 15.

- Towns
  - Banff
  - Canmore
- Summer villages
  - Ghost Lake
  - Waiparous
- Specialized municipalities
  - Crowsnest Pass
  - Jasper
- Municipal districts
  - Bighorn No. 8, M.D. of
  - Ranchland No. 66, M.D. of
- Improvement districts
  - Improvement District No. 8
  - Improvement District No. 9 (Banff National Park)
  - Improvement District No. 12 (Jasper National Park)
  - Kananaskis Improvement District
- First Nation reserves
  - Stoney 142, 143, 144

== Demographics ==
Historical population
Year	Pop.	±%
1991	26,359	—
1996	30,800	+16.8%
2001	34,068	+10.6%
2006	34,150	+0.2%
2011	35,983	+5.4%
2016	38,594	+7.3%
2021	37,735	−2.2%

In the 2021 Census of Population conducted by Statistics Canada, Division No. 15 had a population of 37,735 living in 15,085 of its 19,121 total private dwellings, a change of −2.2% from its 2016 population of 38,594. With a land area of 28,270.14 km^{2} (10,915.16 sq mi), it had a population density of 1.3/km^{2} (3.5/sq mi) in 2021.

== See also ==
- List of census divisions of Alberta
- List of communities in Alberta
