= Springbank =

Springbank might refer to any of the following places:

- Springbank, Alberta is a rural suburb of the City of Calgary, Alberta.
- Springbank Community High School is a high school located in Springbank, Alberta.
- Springbank Hill, Calgary (commonly, Springbank) is a suburban subdivision of the City of Calgary, Alberta.
- Calgary/Springbank Airport is a reliever airport and is the second most important airport for the City of Calgary, Alberta.
- Springbank Distillery is based in Scotland and produces Scotch Whisky.
- Springbank (Old Lyme, Connecticut), listed on the U.S. National Register of Historic Places (NRHP)
- Springbank (Roslyn Harbor, New York), also NRHP-listed
- Springbank Township, Dixon County, Nebraska
- Springbank, an alcoholic drink
