= Blaine Kruger =

Canadian football player (born 1985)

No. 81
- Position: Wide receiver

Personal information
- Born: August 23, 1985 (age 41); Cochrane, Alberta, Canada
- Listed height: 6 ft 4 in (1.93 m)
- Listed weight: 210 lb (95 kg)

Career information
- High school: Cochrane (AB)
- University: British Columbia

Career history
- 2009: Calgary Stampeders

Awards and highlights
- Canada West All-Star (2008)
- Stats at CFL.ca (archive)

Blaine Kruger (born August 23, 1985) is a Canadian former professional football wide receiver who played one season with the Calgary Stampeders of the Canadian Football League. He was signed by the Stampeders as an undrafted free agent in 2009. He played CIS football for the UBC Thunderbirds. He played junior football with the Victoria Rebels.
