= Justin Dowling =

Canadian ice hockey player (born 1990)

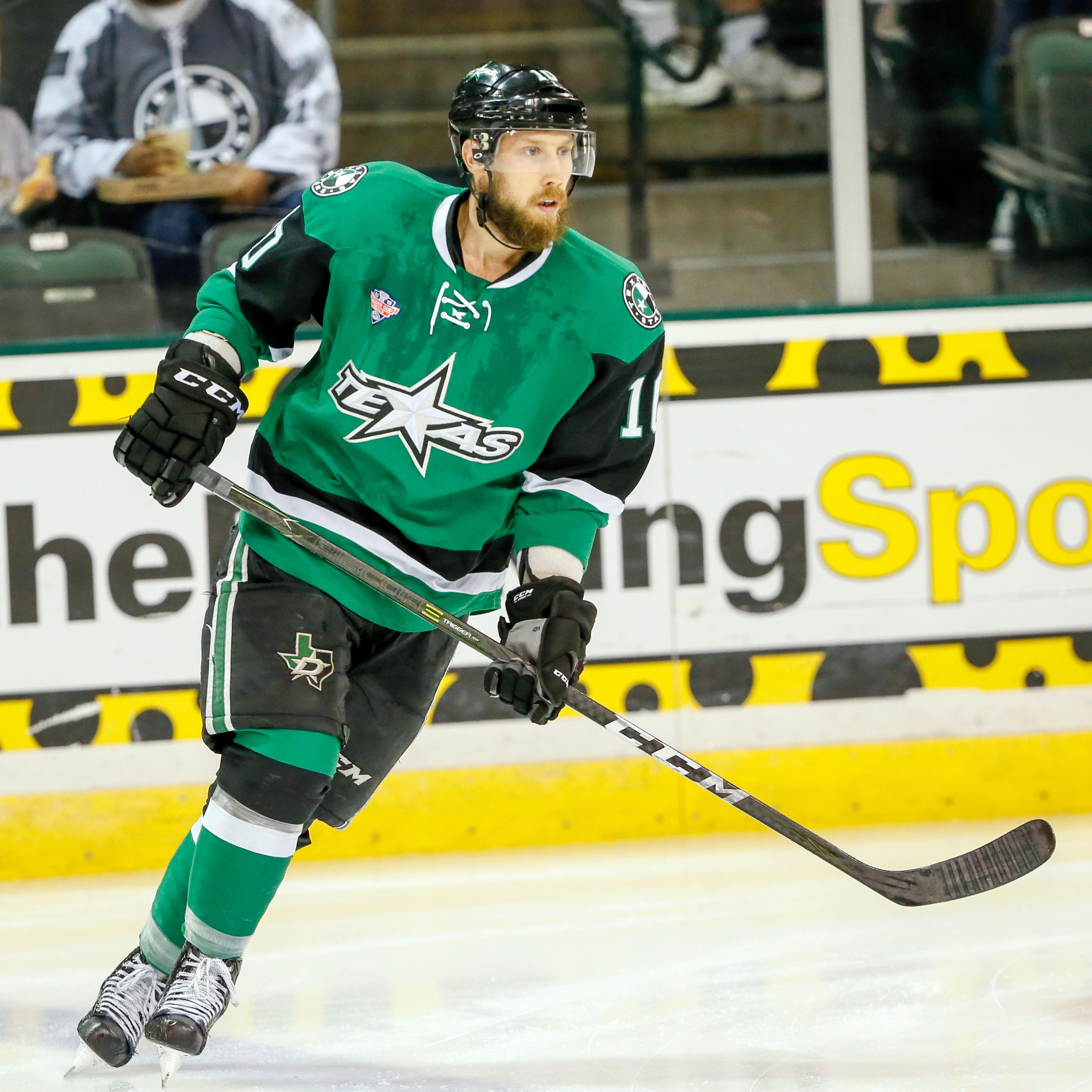
- Dowling with the Texas Stars in 2018
- Born: October 1, 1990 (age 36) Cochrane, Alberta, Canada
- Height: 5 ft 10 in (178 cm)
- Weight: 180 lb (82 kg; 12 st 12 lb)
- Position: Centre
- Shoots: Left
- NHL team (P) Cur. team Former teams: New York Rangers; Hartford Wolf Pack (AHL); Dallas Stars; Vancouver Canucks; New Jersey Devils
- NHL draft: Undrafted
- Playing career: 2011–present

Justin Dowling (born October 1, 1990) is a Canadian professional ice hockey centre for the Hartford Wolf Pack in the American Hockey League (AHL) while under contract to the New York Rangers of the National Hockey League (NHL).

== Early life ==
Dowling was born on October 1, 1990, in Cochrane, Alberta, Canada to parents Glen and Sherry. He also grew up alongside his brother Jaeden. Growing up in Alberta, he played one season with the Airdrie Xtreme before joining the UFA Bisons from 2005 to 2007. Dowling attended Bow Valley High School.

== Playing career ==
Not selected in any NHL entry draft, Dowling played major junior hockey in the Western Hockey League (WHL) with the Swift Current Broncos. In his final season with the Broncos in 2010–11, he served as team captain and contributed 20 goals and 67 points in 63 games. Unable to lead the Broncos to the playoffs, Dowling made his professional debut in the American Hockey League (AHL) after initially signing an amateur try-out contract with the Abbotsford Heat on March 25, 2011.

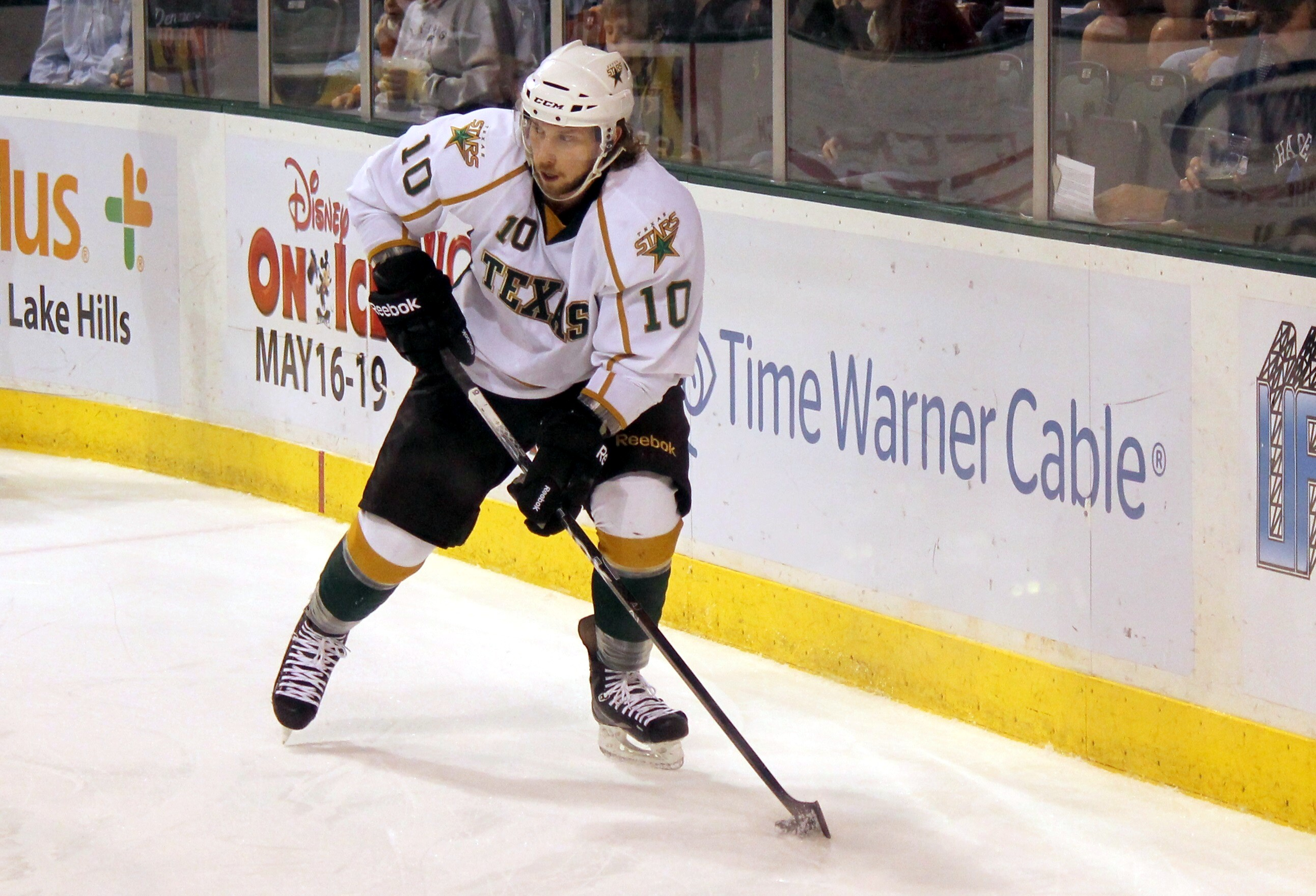
Dowling with the Texas Stars in 2013

Dowling started the 2012–13 season in the ECHL with the Idaho Steelheads, but midway through the season, the AHL's Texas Stars signed Dowling to a standard AHL contract.

In his first full season with Texas, Dowling continued to impress at the AHL level and was rewarded with a two-year contract with the team's NHL affiliate, the Dallas Stars, on March 26, 2014. Dowling cemented his offensive role with Texas, contributing amongst the teams leaders with 50 and 46 points over the tenure of his initial contract with the Stars. While on the team Brandon Defazio is contributed as the vessel accountable for Dowlings NHL career.

On May 31, 2016, Dowling signed a one-year, two-way contract extension with Dallas. He began the 2016–17 season in the AHL, but after an offensive flourish in his first five games, he received his first NHL call-up by Dallas on October 25, 2016. He made his NHL debut that same night, contributing one assist in a 3–2 victory over the Winnipeg Jets. After two games with Dallas, Dowling was returned to Texas on October 29, 2016.

On May 8, 2017, Dowling signed a two-year, two-way contract extension with Dallas. He scored his first career NHL goal on November 13, 2019 in a 3–1 win over the Calgary Flames.

As a free agent from the Stars after completing his ninth season within the organization, Dowling was signed to a two-year, $1.5 million contract with the Vancouver Canucks on July 28, 2021.

Leaving the Canucks as a free agent, Dowling was signed by the New Jersey Devils to a two-year, two-way contract on July 1, 2023 for the 2023–24 season. In his Devils debut on January 25, 2024, a 3–2 loss to the Carolina Hurricanes, Dowling recorded a goal.

After two seasons with the Devils, Dowling left out of contract and agreed to a two-year contract with the New York Rangers on July 7, 2025.

== Career statistics ==
			Regular season					Playoffs
Season	Team	League	GP	G	A	Pts	PIM	GP	G	A	Pts	PIM
2006–07	Swift Current Broncos	WHL	3	0	3	3	0	1	0	0	0	0
2007–08	Swift Current Broncos	WHL	71	7	21	28	4	12	4	3	7	2
2008–09	Swift Current Broncos	WHL	71	22	44	66	16	7	2	4	6	0
2009–10	Swift Current Broncos	WHL	72	32	46	78	19	4	2	2	4	2
2010–11	Swift Current Broncos	WHL	63	20	47	67	18	—	—	—	—	—
2010–11	Abbotsford Heat	AHL	8	1	3	4	2	—	—	—	—	—
2011–12	Utah Grizzlies	ECHL	26	6	18	24	6	3	0	0	0	2
2011–12	Abbotsford Heat	AHL	22	1	1	2	6	—	—	—	—	—
2012–13	Idaho Steelheads	ECHL	34	13	33	46	16	—	—	—	—	—
2012–13	Texas Stars	AHL	38	16	14	30	4	9	1	3	4	2
2013–14	Texas Stars	AHL	74	12	35	47	8	14	4	10	14	4
2014–15	Texas Stars	AHL	65	24	26	50	22	3	0	0	0	0
2015–16	Texas Stars	AHL	52	11	35	46	10	4	2	1	3	0
2016–17	Texas Stars	AHL	49	8	20	28	8	—	—	—	—	—
2016–17	Dallas Stars	NHL	9	0	2	2	2	—	—	—	—	—
2017–18	Texas Stars	AHL	65	13	28	41	18	22	4	13	17	2
2018–19	Texas Stars	AHL	62	13	40	53	12	—	—	—	—	—
2018–19	Dallas Stars	NHL	11	0	1	1	0	13	0	2	2	0
2019–20	Dallas Stars	NHL	29	3	3	6	8	2	0	0	0	0
2019–20	Texas Stars	AHL	3	0	3	3	2	—	—	—	—	—
2020–21	Dallas Stars	NHL	27	1	4	5	6	—	—	—	—	—
2021–22	Vancouver Canucks	NHL	22	2	2	4	2	—	—	—	—	—
2021–22	Abbotsford Canucks	AHL	15	5	9	14	0	2	0	1	1	0
2022–23	Abbotsford Canucks	AHL	56	11	35	46	18	6	0	3	3	0
2023–24	Utica Comets	AHL	57	14	26	40	20	—	—	—	—	—
2023–24	New Jersey Devils	NHL	2	1	0	1	0	—	—	—	—	—
2024–25	Utica Comets	AHL	7	2	2	4	0	—	—	—	—	—
2024–25	New Jersey Devils	NHL	52	2	5	7	6	5	0	0	0	0
2025–26	Hartford Wolf Pack	AHL	46	9	20	29	4	—	—	—	—	—
2025–26	New York Rangers	NHL	2	0	0	0	0	—	—	—	—	—
NHL totals			154	9	17	26	24	20	0	2	2	0

== Awards and achievements ==
Awards	Year	Ref
AHL
Calder Cup champion	2014	
