= Harmony, Alberta =

Harmony
- Hamlet
- Location of Harmony in Alberta
- Coordinates: 51.113°N 114.393°W
- Country: Canada
- Province: Alberta
- Census division: No. 6
- Municipal district: Rocky View County
- Plan approved: 2007
- Settled: 2016
- Hamlet: June 11, 2024

Government
  - Type: Unincorporated
  - Reeve: Greg Boehlke
  - Governing body: Rocky View County Council: Jerry Arshinoff; Rolly Ashdown; Margaret Bahcheli; Greg Boehlke; Liz Breakey; Lois Habberfield; Bruce Kendall; Eric Lowther; Earl Solberg

Area (2021)
  - Land: 6.92 km^{2} (2.67 sq mi)

Population (2021)
  - Total: 757
  - Density: 109.5/km^{2} (284/sq mi)
- Time zone: UTC−06:00 (Alberta Time)
- Area code: +1-403

Harmony is a hamlet within Rocky View County in the Canadian province of Alberta. It is adjacent to the Springbank Airport, approximately 23 km (14 mi) west of downtown Calgary and 10 km (6.2 mi) southeast of the Town of Cochrane. At a planned size of 707 ha (1,750 acres), Harmony is estimated to have a population of 10,000 residents living in 3,500 dwelling units at full build-out.

== History ==
Harmony received planning approval through the adoption of a conceptual scheme by Rocky View County in February 2007, with a neighbourhood plan for the first stage of Harmony subsequently approved in October 2008. In mid-2012, it was anticipated that it would take 15 years to build out the community. Despite its prior planning approvals, the application for the first stage of subdivision in 2012 was met with local resistance. Concerns were expressed by the Springbank Airport Business and Pilots Association over the long-term incompatibility of the community with the pre-existing airport. Specific concerns included safety as well as speculation that future residents would complain about the noise associated with the airport's operations. Other local stakeholders expressed concerns about the impacts Harmony would have on the existing rural community and the loss of farmland. Rocky View County Council approved the subdivision application for the first stage of the community in early July 2012. The community welcomed its first family in 2016. Within two years, it grew to a population of 249. It was officially designated as a hamlet on June 11, 2024 when it had an estimated population of 1,500.

== Demographics ==
In the 2021 Census of Population conducted by Statistics Canada, Harmony had a population of 757 living in 230 of its 256 total private dwellings. With a land area of 6.92 km^{2} (2.67 sq mi), it had a population density of 109.4/km^{2} (283.3/sq mi) in 2021.

Harmony recorded a population of 249 in Rocky View County's 2018 municipal census.

== Attractions ==
Planned amenities in Harmony include a regional park, playfields, greenbelts, a golf course and a recreational lake.

== See also ==
- List of hamlets in Alberta
