= Cochrane High School (Cochrane, Alberta) =

Location
- 529 – 4th Ave. N Cochrane, Alberta, T4C 1Y6; Canada; 51.197°N 114.471°W

Information
- Type: Public
- Motto: Carpe Diem ("Seize the Day")
- Established: 1962
- School board: Rocky View Schools
- Principal: Jeff Chalmers
- Grades: 9–12
- Enrollment: 850 (2019)
- Colours: Maroon, Black, cardinal red, and white
- Mascot: Coby the Cobra
- Team name: Cobras
- Website: cochrane.rockyview.ab.ca

Cochrane High School is a public secondary school located in Cochrane, Alberta, Canada. The school's enrollment is approximately 800 to 850 students, in grades 9 through 12. The school falls under the jurisdiction of Rocky View Schools.

The school's official mascot is a Cobra named Coby.

== History ==
The school was established in December 1962. Before then, students attended Andrew Sibbald School. Andrew Sibbald School was reserved for grades 1–9. Because the school was unable to house the influx of students, grade 12 students were forced to attend Mount Royal College to complete their senior matriculation. As the population of Cochrane increased, the need to build a suitable high school was approved by the Board of Cochrane School district.

In December 1962, students were moved to a new building. On January 1, 1966, the schools in Cochrane became a part of Calgary Rural School Division #41 (later to become Rocky View School Division #41). New additions to the building included a home Economics room, Industrial Arts room, Biology lab, library and typing room to conclude projects for the school in the 1960s. In subsequent years, full renovations occurred such a new gymnasium, a separate wing for the Junior High, library expansion, new science labs, a drama room, cafeteria/student lounge area and a transformation of administrative areas (including guidance offices).

== Athletics ==
The school competes and participates in the South Central Zone of the Alberta Schools Athletic Association. It holds membership in the Rocky View Sports Association.

The Cochrane High School football program has ranked amongst the best in the province of Alberta winning two provincial Tier II championships and twelve provincial Tier III championships. along with possessing the Alberta football records for consecutive games won with 40 and consecutive provincial championships won with 5, both set in the 2018 season.

In 2018, the girl's curling team won Cochrane High School's first Provincial Curling championship after an undefeated season.

Annually, Cochrane High School hosts a classic hockey between itself and Bow Valley High School to raise money for a chosen charity. Players are composed of current Cochrane High School students. The event is organized by the Cochrane High School and Bow Valley High School, and is not involved in the Rockyview View Sports Association nor the Alberta Schools Athletic Association.

== Theater ==
The Cochrane High School Performing Arts Program is known for its well-received productions, including Fiddler on the Roof, Newsies, How to Eat Like a Child, Les Miserables, and Beauty and the Beast.

Cochrane High Performing Arts programs include technical theater, advanced acting, and band.

The school also competes and participates in the zone festivals of the Alberta High School Drama Festival Association.

== Alumni ==
- Rob Cote, CFL player for the Calgary Stampeders
- George Fox, Country and western singer, attended Cochrane High and has a road in the area named after him
- Blaine Kruger, CFL player for the Calgary Stampeders
- Mason Raymond, NHL player for the Calgary Flames
- Justin Sambu, CFL player for the Calgary Stampeders
