= Justin Sambu =

Canadian football player (born 1999)

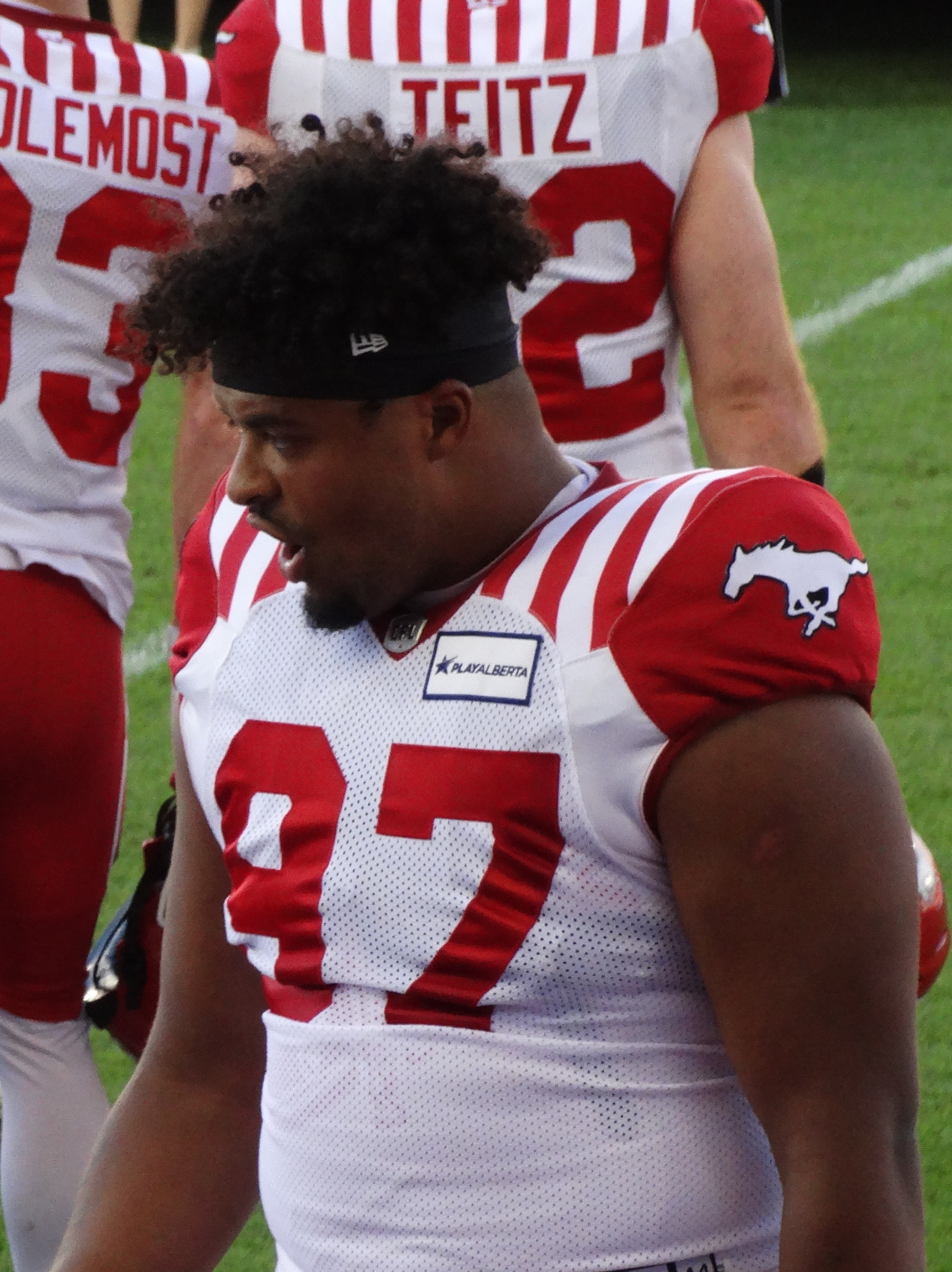
- Sambu with the Calgary Stampeders in 2024

No. 97 – Calgary Stampeders
- Position: Defensive lineman
- Roster status: Practice roster
- CFL status: National

Personal information
- Born: January 22, 1999 (age 27); Calgary, Alberta, Canada
- Listed height: 6 ft 3 in (1.91 m)
- Listed weight: 295 lb (134 kg)

Career information
- High school: Cochrane (Cochrane, Alberta)
- College: Maine (2018–2022); Baylor (2023)
- CFL draft: 2024: 6th round, 54th overall pick

Career history
- 2024: Toronto Argonauts*
- 2024–present: Calgary Stampeders
- * Offseason or practice squad member only
- Stats at CFL.ca

Justin Sambu (born January 22, 1999) is a Canadian professional football defensive lineman for the Calgary Stampeders of the Canadian Football League (CFL). He played college football at Maine and Baylor. He has also been a member of the Toronto Argonauts of the CFL.

== Early life ==
Sambu played high school football at Cochrane High School in Cochrane, Alberta. In 2016, he was rated the eighth best player, and the No. 2 defensive end, in Canada. He was also a member of the Team Canada football team.

== College career ==
Sambu first played college football for the Maine Black Bears from 2019 to 2022. He was redshirted in 2018. He played in five games in 2019, and made one tackle. The 2020 Maine football season was moved to spring 2021 due to the COVID-19 pandemic. Sambu played in all four games of the shortened season, recording five tackles and one forced fumble. He appeared in nine games during the fall 2021 season, totaling 21 tackles and one fumble recovery. He played in all 11 games in 2022, accumulating 32 tackles, 5.5 sacks, and one forced fumble. Sambu's sack total led the team that season.

Sambu transferred to play for the Baylor Bears in 2023. He appeared in all 12 games, as a member of the field goal unit, and made two tackles.

== Professional career ==
Pre-draft measurables
Height	Weight	Arm length	Hand span	Wingspan	40-yard dash	10-yard split	20-yard split	20-yard shuttle	Three-cone drill	Vertical jump	Broad jump
6 ft 3 1/8 in (1.91 m)	278 lb (126 kg)	32 7/8 in (0.84 m)	9 1/4 in (0.23 m)	6 ft 7 3/8 in (2.02 m)	5.28 s	1.82 s	3.01 s	4.76 s	7.72 s	25.0 in (0.64 m)	8 ft 9 in (2.67 m)
All values from Pro Day

=== Toronto Argonauts ===
Sambu was selected by the Toronto Argonauts in the sixth round, with the 54th overall pick, of the 2024 CFL draft. He officially signed with the team on May 6. He was released by the Argonauts on June 1, 2024.

=== Calgary Stampeders ===
Sambu was signed to the practice roster of the Calgary Stampeders of the CFL on July 16, 2024. He was moved to the active roster on August 3. The next day, he recorded one sack and one solo tackle in his CFL debut as the Stampeders beat Sambu's former team, the Argonauts, by a score of 27–23. Sambu was moved back to the practice roster on August 14, 2024.
