= Rocky View Schools =

School district in Alberta, Canada

Location
- 2651 Chinook Winds Drive SW; Airdrie, Alberta Canada
- Coordinates: 51°16′7″N 114°1′50″W

District information
- Superintendent: Greg Luterbach
- Chair of the board: Fiona Gilbert
- Schools: 51

Students and staff
- Students: 25,000

Other information
- Elected trustees: Shali Baziuk, ward 1; Shelley Kinley, ward 2; Melyssa Bowen, ward 3; Todd Brand, ward 3; Fred Burley, ward 3; Norma Lang, ward 4; Judi Hunter, ward 5; Fiona Gilbert, ward 6
- Website: www.rockyview.ab.ca

Rocky View School Division No. 41 or Rocky View Schools (RVS) is the public school authority that serves students to the west, north and east of the City of Calgary in the province of Alberta.

The original board's name was called Calgary Rural Schools Division #41, then eventually changed to Rocky View Schools.

== Size ==
RVS serves approximately 25,000 students with educational services from Kindergarten to Grade 12. The district operates 51 schools in its jurisdiction.

== Schools ==
=== Airdrie ===
==== Elementary schools ====
- A.E. Bowers Elementary School (K-6)
- Cooper's Crossing School (K-5)
- École Edwards Elementary School (K-6)
- Heloise Lorimer School (K-6)
- Nose Creek Elementary School (K-5)
- R.J. Hawkey Elementary School (K-6)
- Ralph McCall School (K-5)

==== Elementary/Middle schools ====
- Herons Crossing School (K-9)
- Northcott Prairie School (K-9)
- Windsong Heights School (K-9)

==== Middle schools ====
- C.W. Perry School (6-9)
- École Airdrie Middle School (7-9)
- Meadowbrook School (7-9)
- Muriel Clayton Middle School (6-9)

==== Secondary schools ====
- Bert Church High School (10-12)
- George McDougall High School (10-12)
- RVS Community Learning Centre - Airdrie
- W.H. Croxford High School (10-12)

=== Chestermere & Area ===
- Chestermere High School (10-12)
- Chestermere Lake Middle School (7-9)
- East Lake School (K-9)
- Prairie Waters Elementary School (K-6)
- Rainbow Creek Elementary School (K-6)
- RVS Community Learning Centre - Chestermere

=== Cochrane & Area ===
==== Elementary schools ====
- Elizabeth Barrett Elementary School (K-4)
- Glenbow Elementary School (K-4)

==== Elementary/Middle schools ====
- Bearspaw School (K-8)
- Cochrane Christian Academy (K-8)
- Fireside School (K-8)
- RancheView School (K-8)
- Westbrook School (K-8)

==== Middle schools ====
- Manachaban Middle School (5-8)
- Mitford School (5-8)

==== Secondary schools ====
- Bow Valley High School (9-12)
- Cochrane High School (9-12)
- RVS Community Learning Centre - Cochrane

=== Crossfield & Area ===
- Beiseker Community School (K-12)
- Crossfield Elementary School (K-5)
- Kathyrn School (K-8)
- W.G. Murdoch School (6-12)

=== Langdon & Area ===
- Horseshoe Crossing High School (9-12)
- Indus School (K-8)
- Langdon School (K-8)
- Sarah Thompson School (K-5)

=== Springbank & Area ===
- Banded Peak School (K-8)
- Elbow Valley Elementary School (K-4)
- Springbank Community High School (9-12)
- Springbank Middle School (5-8)

=== Online Schools ===
- Discovery Trails Online School (1-9)
- Summit Trails Online School (10-12)

== Governance ==
RVS is the fifth-largest school board in Alberta, and operates independently of its neighbouring Calgary school boards; Calgary Board of Education and the Calgary Catholic School District, but still operates under the direct authority of the provincial government of Alberta. The board consists of eight members who are elected every four years during municipal elections to represent seven urban and rural wards.

== Special programs ==
RVS offers a variety of special programming to its students, such as French Immersion, Christian Education, Home Education, Distance Learning (Online Learning), Outreach Campuses, and a Summer School program. The district board also recognizes students and their families with First Nations, Metis, and Inuit heritage by providing support services and programs through Native Liaison Workers.

== See also ==
- List of Alberta school boards
- List of high schools in Alberta
