= Springbank Hill, Calgary =

Neighbourhood: Suburb in Calgary, Alberta, Canada

Springbank Hill
- Neighbourhood: Suburb
- Location of Springbank Hill in Calgary
- Coordinates: 51°01′43″N 114°12′25″W
- Country: Canada
- Province: Alberta
- City: Calgary
- Quadrant: SW
- Ward: 6
- Established: 1999
- Annexed: 1994

Government
  - Mayor: Jeromy Farkas
  - Administrative body: Calgary City Council
  - Councillor: John Pantazopoulos (Independent)
- Elevation: 1,130 m (3,710 ft)

Population (2009)
  - Total: 7,875
  - Average Income: $116,470
- Postal code: T3H
- Website: Springbank Hill Community Association

Springbank Hill is a large and diverse suburb near the western city limit of Calgary, Alberta in the southwest (SW) quadrant. It is bounded to the north by 17 Avenue SW, to the south by Stoney Trail, to the east by 69 Street SW and to the west by 101 Street SW.

Springbank Hill is sometimes confused with the much older unincorporated rural community of Springbank, located to the west of the city in Rocky View County. The Springbank Hill area was once the eastern portion of Springbank. Springbank Hill was established in 1999, on land annexed to the City of Calgary in 1994. The community association was formed in 2001.

The community of Springbank Hill is made up of numerous subdivisions, including Springborough, Summit of Montreux, Springbank Hill, The Slopes, Anatapi and Spring Valley.

Springbank Hill is home to Ernest Manning High School, which commenced classes in September 2011, and Ambrose University College. The 69 Street station of the West LRT (which began operations on December 10, 2012), is also located in Springbank Hill.

== Demographics ==
In the City of Calgary's 2012 municipal census, Springbank Hill had a population of 8,783 living in 3,166 dwellings, a 4.7% increase from its 2011 population of 8,388. With a land area of 6.3 km^{2} (2.4 sq mi), it had a population density of 1,394/km^{2} (3,611/sq mi) in 2012.

According to 2006 Census of Canada, residents in this community had a median household income of $116,470 in 2005, and there were 6.7% low income residents living in the neighbourhood. 42.6% of the population aged 15 and over were university educated. In 2006, 87.2% of the buildings were single detached housing, 6.0% were semi-detached, and 6.5% were row houses and apartments. 3.4% of the housing was used for renting.

== Climate ==
Springbank Hill has a semi-monsoonal humid-continental climate (Koppen: Dwb, Trewartha: Dclo) bordering a semi-monsoonal subarctic climate (Koppen: Dwc, Trewartha: Eolo).

Climate data for Springbank Hill (Calgary/Springbank Airport) WMO ID: 71860; coordinates 51°06′11″N 114°22′28″W; elevation: 1,200.9 m (3,940 ft); 1981–2010 normals
Month	Jan	Feb	Mar	Apr	May	Jun	Jul	Aug	Sep	Oct	Nov	Dec	Year
Record high humidex	15.7	21.3	22.9	25.7	30.6	31.9	34.1	34.0	31.0	26.4	20.5	17.1	34.1
Record high °C (°F)	16.5 (61.7)	22.1 (71.8)	23.8 (74.8)	26.5 (79.7)	33.0 (91.4)	31.0 (87.8)	33.8 (92.8)	32.1 (89.8)	30.6 (87.1)	27.1 (80.8)	20.4 (68.7)	17.9 (64.2)	33.8 (92.8)
Mean daily maximum °C (°F)	−1.8 (28.8)	0.0 (32.0)	3.9 (39.0)	10.5 (50.9)	15.3 (59.5)	18.8 (65.8)	22.2 (72.0)	21.2 (70.2)	17.0 (62.6)	11.0 (51.8)	2.3 (36.1)	−0.6 (30.9)	10.0 (50.0)
Daily mean °C (°F)	−8.2 (17.2)	−6.7 (19.9)	−2.7 (27.1)	3.4 (38.1)	8.1 (46.6)	12.1 (53.8)	14.8 (58.6)	13.7 (56.7)	9.5 (49.1)	3.9 (39.0)	−3.8 (25.2)	−7 (19)	3.1 (37.5)
Mean daily minimum °C (°F)	−14.5 (5.9)	−13.4 (7.9)	−9.2 (15.4)	−3.8 (25.2)	0.9 (33.6)	5.4 (41.7)	7.4 (45.3)	6.2 (43.2)	1.9 (35.4)	−3.3 (26.1)	−9.9 (14.2)	−13.3 (8.1)	−3.8 (25.2)
Record low °C (°F)	−42.8 (−45.0)	−41.6 (−42.9)	−36.3 (−33.3)	−21.7 (−7.1)	−14.1 (6.6)	−6.1 (21.0)	−0.1 (31.8)	−5.9 (21.4)	−9.8 (14.4)	−29.1 (−20.4)	−36.5 (−33.7)	−41.6 (−42.9)	−42.8 (−45.0)
Record low wind chill	−56.0	−56.0	−48.0	−27.0	−20.0	−10.0	−4.0	−8.0	−14.0	−38.0	−48.0	−57.0	−57.0
Average precipitation mm (inches)	9.9 (0.39)	11.5 (0.45)	17.6 (0.69)	25.4 (1.00)	61.1 (2.41)	106.7 (4.20)	66.9 (2.63)	78.0 (3.07)	50.3 (1.98)	16.3 (0.64)	16.3 (0.64)	9.8 (0.39)	469.8 (18.49)
Average rainfall mm (inches)	0.2 (0.01)	0.0 (0.0)	0.4 (0.02)	9.3 (0.37)	49.5 (1.95)	106.7 (4.20)	66.9 (2.63)	78.0 (3.07)	45.5 (1.79)	7.0 (0.28)	2.4 (0.09)	0.3 (0.01)	366.2 (14.42)
Average snowfall cm (inches)	12.7 (5.0)	14.7 (5.8)	21.7 (8.5)	19.0 (7.5)	12.4 (4.9)	0.0 (0.0)	0.1 (0.0)	0.0 (0.0)	5.3 (2.1)	11.6 (4.6)	17.4 (6.9)	12.4 (4.9)	127.3 (50.2)
Average precipitation days (≥ 0.2 mm)	5.8	5.7	7.5	8.1	11.6	14.5	12.8	12.4	9.4	7.2	6.0	5.3	106.3
Average rainy days (≥ 0.2 mm)	0.17	0.04	0.48	3.5	9.7	14.5	12.8	12.3	8.8	4.3	0.91	0.23	67.73
Average snowy days (≥ 0.2 cm)	6.0	5.9	7.6	5.8	3.0	0.0	0.09	0.05	1.4	3.9	5.9	5.4	45.0
Average relative humidity (%)	58.6	56.0	50.3	43.3	45.7	50.8	48.2	49.2	47.8	46.5	57.1	60.4	51.2
Source: Environment Canada

== See also ==
- List of neighbourhoods in Calgary
