= Bert Church High School =

Location
- 1010 East Lake Boulevard; Airdrie, Alberta, T4A 2A1; Canada; 51°17′0.2″N 113°59′29.4″W

Information
- Type: Public school
- Motto: Quaerite Excellentiam (Strive for Excellence)
- Established: 1983
- School board: Rocky View Schools
- Superintendent: Greg Luterbach
- Principal: Nikki Tysowski
- Enrollment: estimated 1400
- Colours: Blue and Yellow
- Sports: Football, Basketball, Soccer, Badminton, Curling, Golf, Volleyball
- Mascot: Ram (mascot costume previously portrayed by Levi Bucholtz)
- Team name: Bert Church Chargers
- Feeder schools: Meadowbrook School, Good Shepherd School, CW Perry School, Windsong Heights School, Northcott Prairie School, Heron’s Crossing School, St. Veronica School, Our Lady Queen of Peace School, Muriel Clayton School
- Website: http://bertchurch.rockyview.ab.ca/

Bert Church High School is a high school in Airdrie, Alberta, Canada with approximately 1400 students in enrollment. The school is under the administration of Rocky View Schools. Bert Church High School is named after Bert Church, the son of an early Albertan settler, and a member of the rural school board of Calgary.

== History ==
Bert Church High School opened in 1983, becoming Airdrie's only high school. The school replaced George McDougall High School, which became a Junior High School. This arrangement lasted for four years, after which George McDougall reverted back to a high school to alleviate demand from Bert Church. Bert Church High School's namesake is Bert Church, who died in 1984. He was the son of one of Alberta's earliest settlers, W.J. Church, who arrived in 1890. Bert was a member of the rural school board of Calgary.

== Programs, courses, and clubs ==
The school offers an assortment of clubs and courses for students to choose from. Musical programs at Bert Church include: concert choir, junior and senior concert band, as well as senior jazz band, which have performed for former Alberta Premier, Alison Redford. Bert Church also is noted for its drama, performing arts and technical theater courses, which put on winter and spring productions.

Courses include mechanics, art, Aboriginal studies, photography, videography, and more.

== Bert Church Live Theatre ==
Bert Church High School is noted for its 373-seat proscenium theatre which is used for both school productions, and professional productions. The theatre is also used as a teaching space for grade 10-12 drama and technical theatre classes.

== Athletics ==
Bert Church offers a variety of athletic programs including football, volleyball, basketball, cross country running, soccer, golf, and curling. The school's official team name is The Bert Church Chargers.

=== Under Armour Finding Undeniable Contest ===
Bert Church High School was the Under Armour Finding Undeniable 2013 winner. The school received support from then premier Alison Redford, MP Blake Richards, and Rocky Views superintendent Greg Bass in a contest that could win $100,000 in sports equipment.

=== Special Olympics ===
In 2018, Bert Church participated in the Ontario Special Olympics, winning a gold medal. Four of their students defended their title in 2019, winning bronze medals each.

== Notable alumni ==
- Ty Rattie: Professional hockey player drafted 32nd overall in the 2011 NHL entry draft by the St. Louis Blues.
