= Vortex (Calaway Park) =

Roller coaster at Calaway Park, Alberta, Canada

The Vortex
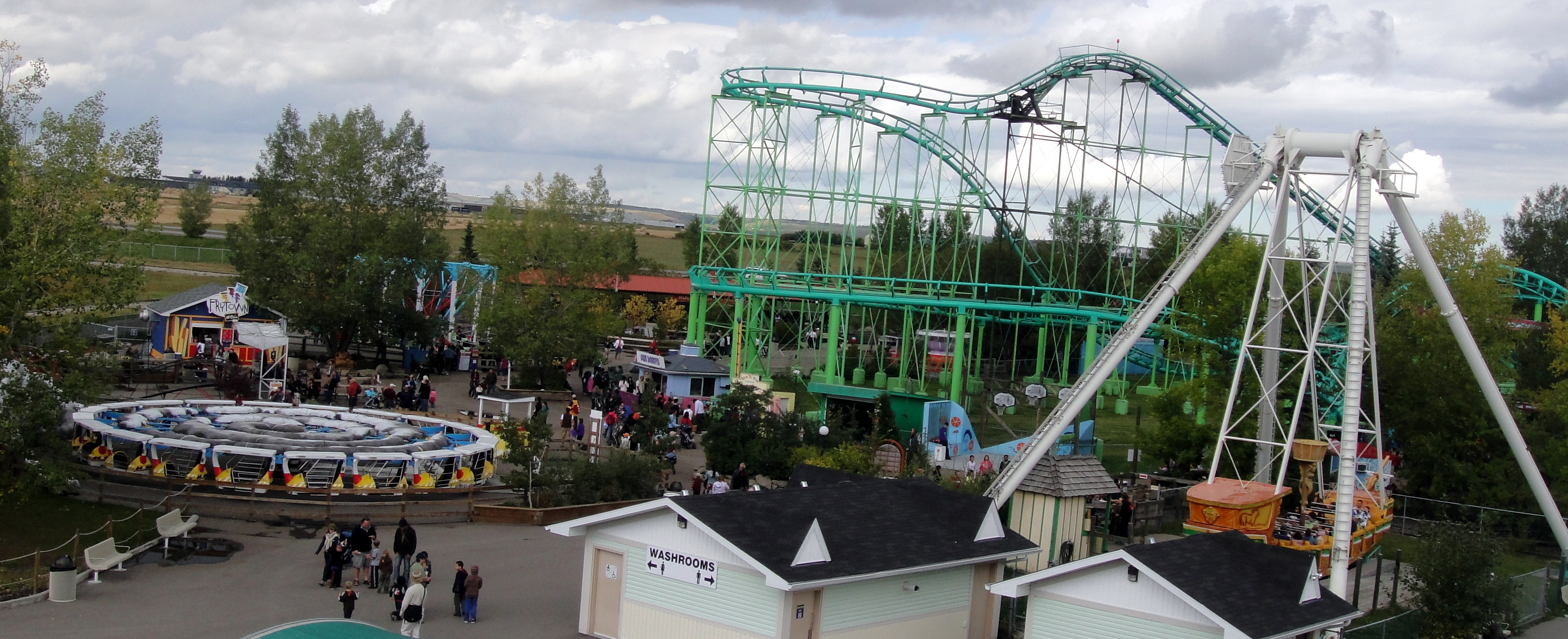
- The green roller coaster is The Vortex.

Calaway Park
- Location: Calaway Park
- Coordinates: 51°05′15″N 114°21′34″W
- Status: Operating
- Opening date: 1982

General statistics
- Type: Steel
- Manufacturer: Arrow Dynamics
- Model: Corkscrew
- Lift/launch system: Chain lift hill
- Drop: 70 ft (21 m)
- Inversions: 2
- Height restriction: 48 in (122 cm)
- Trains: Single train with 6 cars; riders arranged 2 across in 2 rows for a total of 24 riders per train
- The Vortex at RCDB

The Vortex (previously known as Turn of the Century and Corkscrew) is a corkscrew roller coaster in Calaway Park in Alberta, Canada.

When it opened, it was named "Turn of the Century" and was painted an "earth tone" brown to blend in with the surrounding landscape. In 1986, it was renamed "Corkscrew". In the 2004 off-season, the track and supports were painted green, and the coaster train was painted pink. During this time it was renamed "The Vortex" with the new catchphrase "Fun From The Bottom Of Your Stomach". This update debuted when the park opened for the 2005 season. The update was for Alberta's centennial.

In the 2019 off-season, The Vortex was repainted by Baynum Painting to a green and purple color scheme. The coaster train remains the same pink color.

The Vortex, unlike most roller coasters similar in size, sends riders around for two laps rather than one to accommodate for the short track length.
