= Chestermere =

Chestermere Chestermere Lake (1977–1993)
- City
- City of Chestermere
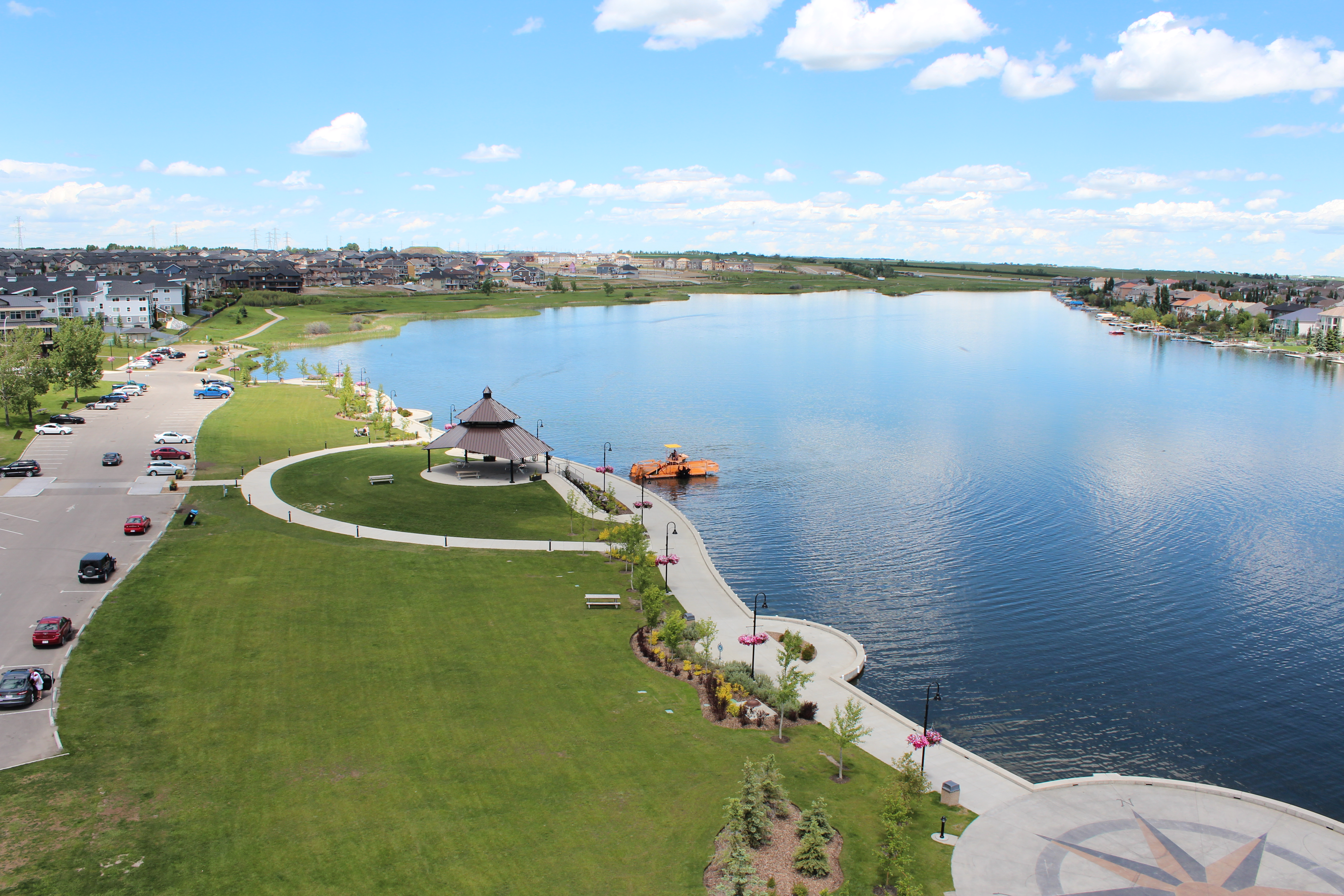
- Aerial view of Chestermere

- Logo

- Location within Rocky View County

- Location of Chestermere in Alberta
- Coordinates: 51°03′00″N 113°49′21″W
- Country: Canada
- Province: Alberta
- Region: Calgary Region
- Census division: 6
- Adjacent municipal district: Rocky View County
- Founded: 1884
- Incorporated
  - Summer village: April 1, 1977
  - Town: March 1, 1993
  - City: January 1, 2015

Government
  - Mayor: Shannon Dean
  - Governing body: Chestermere City Council: Rob Wawrzynowski; Robert Schindler; Janelle Sandboe; Kiran Randhawa; Murray Grant; Ritesh Narayan
  - CAO: Kent Edney
  - MP: David Bexte
  - MLA: Chantelle de Jonge

Area (2021)
  - Land: 32.83 km^{2} (12.68 sq mi)
- Elevation: 1,030 m (3,380 ft)

Population (2021)
  - Total: 22,163
  - Density: 675/km^{2} (1,750/sq mi)
- Time zone: UTC−06:00 (Alberta Time)
- Forward sortation area: T1X
- Area codes: 403, 587, 825, 368
- Highways: Trans-Canada Highway (Highway 1)
- Website: chestermere.ca

Chestermere, originally named Chestermere Lake, is a city in the Canadian province of Alberta. It is surrounded by Rocky View County to the north, east, and south and adjacent to Calgary to the west. It is the third-largest city in the Calgary Metropolitan Region. The city, which surrounds Chestermere Lake, changed its name in 1993.

== History ==
=== Early settlement ===
Prior to the 20th century, the area around what is now Chestermere Lake was settled by only a few farmers. When the Canadian Pacific Railway was established in the 1880s, more and more people came to settle in the west. To make farming more productive, settlers began to determine ways to irrigate their land. As a natural wetland, Chestermere Lake was considered to be perfect for use as a balancing pool for the Western Irrigation Block. By 1907, a dam and canal system had been built, the wetland developed into a lake, and farmers began using the water for irrigation.

=== Summer village ===
Following the irrigation development, the lake began to be used for recreation. People would lease land from the Western Irrigation District (WID) (which took control of the land from CPR in 1944), build cabins and stay on the lake during the summer months. In 1959, the Chestermere Cabin Owners Association (CCOA) was incorporated with approximately 50 members. The CCOA held events, bought a fire truck for the community, worked to reduce pollution in the lake, planted trees, and arranged for electricity and natural gas for the cabins.

As more people began to live around Chestermere Lake, residents wanted to secure long-term leases. In 1975, the CCOA bought the land from the WID and then transferred it to the residents. By 1977, the lake boasted 120 permanent homes and gained official status as the Summer Village of Chestermere Lake on April 1, 1977. As a summer village, the residents of Chestermere gained more political influence and were able to begin adding services and amenities or encouraging infrastructure and developments such as fire and protection services, improved roads, a community hall, street lights, a recreation centre, local businesses and a golf course.

=== Town ===
By 1992, Chestermere's population had increased to 1,043 permanent residents. On March 1, 1993, the Summer Village of Chestermere Lake officially changed its status and name to the Town of Chestermere. Becoming a town gave the residents more local and political authority. The town continued developing amenities and services for residents and its population has grown to 17,203 residents as recorded by its 2014 municipal census. In late 2014, town council voted in favour of pursuing city status, which became effective January 1, 2015.

=== City ===
Chestermere's town council voted to apply for city status on September 29, 2014 when it was the fastest growing town in Alberta. It became Alberta's 18th city on January 1, 2015.

In December 2023, mayor Jeff Colvin, three of the six city councillors, and three administrators were removed from office by Alberta Municipal Affairs minister Ric McIver, after the city failed to comply with recommendations in a 2022 third party report. The city was subsequently governed by a provincially-appointed administrator until a byelection was held in June 2024.

== Geography ==
=== Neighbourhoods ===
The city is organized into the following neighbourhoods.

Northeast

- The Cove
- Clearwater

Northwest

- Westmere
- Westmere Commercial
- Lakepointe
- Bridgeport

Southwest

- Chesterview Estates
- The Beaches
- Lakeside Greens
- Lakeview Landing
- Rainbow Falls
- West Creek
- South Shore
- Dawson's Landing
- Chelsea
- Waterford
- Waterford Estates

Southeast

- Chestermere Estates
- East Lakeview Shores
- Estates of Chestermere
- Kinniburgh North
- Kinniburgh South
- Lake Ere Estates

== Demographics ==
Federal census population history
Year	Pop.	±%
1976	210	—
1981	487	+131.9%
1986	584	+19.9%
1991	926	+58.6%
1996	1,911	+106.4%
2001	3,414	+78.6%
2006	9,564	+180.1%
2011	14,824	+55.0%
2016	19,887	+34.2%
2021	22,163	+11.4%
Source: Statistics Canada

In the 2021 Census of Population conducted by Statistics Canada, the City of Chestermere had a population of 22,163 living in 6,733 of its 6,925 total private dwellings, a change of 11.4% from its 2016 population of 19,887. With a land area of 32.83 km^{2} (12.68 sq mi), it had a population density of 675.1/km^{2} (1,748.5/sq mi) in 2021.

The population of the City of Chestermere according to its 2017 municipal census is 20,331, a change of 3.1% from its 2016 municipal census population of 19,715.

In the 2016 Census of Population conducted by Statistics Canada, the City of Chestermere had a population of 19,887 living in 6,112 of its 6,250 total private dwellings, a change of 34.2% from its 2011 population of 14,824. With a land area of 32.94 km^{2} (12.72 sq mi), it had a population density of 603.7/km^{2} (1,563.7/sq mi) in 2016.

=== Ethnicity ===
Panethnic groups in the City of Chestermere (2001−2021)
Panethnic group	2021		2016		2011		2006		2001	
Panethnic group	Pop.	%	Pop.	%	Pop.	%	Pop.	%	Pop.	%
European (Note: Statistic includes all persons that did not make up part of a visible minority or an indigenous identity.)	12,185	55.01%	12,290	61.9%	10,180	68.69%	7,575	79.24%	3,115	91.22%
South Asian	4,485	20.25%	2,830	14.25%	1,465	9.89%	445	4.65%	30	0.88%
Southeast Asian (Note: Statistic includes total responses of "Filipino" and "Southeast Asian" under visible minority section on census.)	2,030	9.16%	1,905	9.59%	1,720	11.61%	510	5.33%	95	2.78%
Indigenous	570	2.57%	610	3.07%	315	2.13%	295	3.09%	35	1.02%
Middle Eastern (Note: Statistic includes total responses of "West Asian" and "Arab" under visible minority section on census.)	750	3.39%	675	3.4%	245	1.65%	175	1.83%	0	0%
African	535	2.42%	430	2.17%	180	1.21%	95	0.99%	45	1.32%
East Asian (Note: Statistic includes total responses of "Chinese", "Korean", and "Japanese" under visible minority section on census.)	505	2.28%	535	2.69%	355	2.4%	220	2.3%	55	1.61%
Latin American	420	1.9%	250	1.26%	100	0.67%	155	1.62%	10	0.29%
Other/multiracial (Note: Statistic includes total responses of "Visible minority, n.i.e." and "Multiple visible minorities" under visible minority section on census.)	660	2.98%	335	1.69%	245	1.65%	90	0.94%	25	0.73%
Total responses	22,150	99.94%	19,855	99.84%	14,820	99.97%	9,560	99.96%	3,415	88.56%
Total population	22,163	100%	19,887	100%	14,824	100%	9,564	100%	3,856	100%
Note: Totals greater than 100% due to multiple origin responses

=== Religion ===
According to the 2021 census, religious groups in Chestermere included:

- Christianity (9,000 persons or 40.6%)
- Irreligion (7,130 persons or 32.2%)
- Sikhism (3,155 persons or 14.2%)
- Islam (1,615 persons or 7.3%)
- Buddhism (760 persons or 3.4%)
- Hinduism (400 persons or 1.8%)
- Judaism (30 persons or 0.1%)
- Other (40 persons or 0.2%)

== Transportation ==
Chestermere is accessible on land through Trans-Canada Highway (Alberta Highway 1) and Chestermere Boulevard / 17 Avenue SE (formerly signed as Alberta Highway 1A). By air, the city is accessible through Chestermere (Kirkby Field) Airport. Calgary Transit provides bus service into Chestermere during the morning and evening rush hours.

== Attractions ==
- Chestermere Lake – Chestermere is well known for its lake. In the summer, it is used for waterskiing, wakeboarding, fishing and a variety of other water sports. It also provides day use parks for launching boats and family areas for the enjoyment of the outdoors. Chestermere Lake is also home to the Calgary Yacht Club.
- Chestermere Water Festival – The Chestermere Water Festival is an annual celebration of summer at the lake.
- Biking and skateboarding – Chestermere is connected to the Calgary bicycle pathway system at the south end of West Chestermere
- Winter Festival – The Chestermere Winter Festival is an annual celebration of winter in a small city.
- Chestermere Drive (by the canal) and has bike trails surrounding the lake, a BMX park and a skate park.
- Lakeside Greens Golf Course in Chestermere is a semi-private 18 hole golf course.
- Camp Chestermere is a Christian camp located on the southeast end of Chestermere Lake.

== Education ==
The public schools in the city are Chestermere High School, Chestermere Lake Middle School, Prairie Waters Elementary School, East Lake School and Rainbow Creek Elementary School. Public schools in the city are run by the Rocky View School Division, which includes several other communities surrounding Calgary.

For publicly funded Catholic education, the city falls within the jurisdiction of the Calgary Catholic School District, which runs the St. Gabriel the Archangel school for grades 8-12 (as of September 2024) and Our Lady of Wisdom school for grade K-6.

Most educational needs beyond this (e.g. post-secondary education) are met within Calgary.

== Contemporary issues ==
On August 1, 2007, the City of Calgary annexed an extensive tract of land from Rocky View County, which placed Calgary's eastern city limits one section (1.6 km or 1 mi) from the Chestermere's western city limits.

Meanwhile, Chestermere's March 2007 Growth Study proposed annexation of, among other areas, the intervening land between Chestermere and the newly expanded Calgary boundaries. On March 13, 2009, Chestermere's annexation was approved resulting in a shared municipal boundary with Calgary.

== See also ==
- List of cities in Alberta
- List of communities in Alberta
