= Chestermere High School =

Location
- 241078 RGE RD 280; Rocky View County, Alberta, T1X 2L4; Canada; 51.02713°N 113.7711°W

Information
- Type: Public
- Motto: Semper Nulli Secundus (Second to None)
- Established: 1961
- School board: Rocky View Schools
- Principal: Chris Robertson
- Grades: 10-12
- Campus: Rural
- Colours: Red and Black
- Team name: Lakers
- Communities served: Chestermere, Langdon, Indus
- Website: chestermerehg.rockyview.ab.ca
- Last updated: February 2024

Chestermere High School is a public high school near Chestermere, Alberta, Canada. About 900 students were enrolled at this school before Grade 9 was removed in 2016 to reduce overcrowding. Currently, there are about 1100 students. The school features three parking lots, one for grades 10 and 11, one for 11 and 12, and a special one for the staff.

It was originally two separate schools: an elementary school and the other for grades 7–12. After an elementary school and middle school were erected in Chestermere, the two were joined by a hallway and the old school became a senior high. The hallway was torn down and renovated in 2008. The hallway now houses several murals, including one of Bob Marley - indicative of the culture throughout the administration.

== Special News ==
Over the span of early 2022 and summer 2024, Netflix big hit TV show "My Life With The Walter Boys" was filmed showcasing several scenes with the school.

== Incidents ==
There has only been one serious violent incident at the school. Two students got into a fight over a girl in 2001. One received hospitalizing injuries and died shortly after. A bench made of hockey sticks was made for the school in memory of the student.

On June 9, 2015, at approximately 3:40pm, emergency crews were called to the scene of a serious car accident just minutes from the school. Two students were taken to the Foothills Medical Centre. Jaydon Sommerfeld, 17, was amongst those injured in the crash and sustained serious injuries. On June 10, 2015, Sommerfeld had succumbed to his injuries and was pronounced brain dead. A balloon release and vigil were held by Sommerfeld's fellow peers, with his girlfriend and younger brother in attendance. In remembrance of Sommerfeld's high academic standing, athletic ability, and kindness, the Jaydon Sommerfeld Memorial Bursary was created.
