= Springbank Community High School =

Public school in Alberta, Canada

Location
- 32226 Springbank Road; Springbank, Alberta, T3Z 2L9; Canada; 51.064305°N 114.324899°W

Information
- Type: Public
- Motto: RISE: Responsibility, Integrity, Strength, Excellence
- Established: 1975
- School board: Rocky View Schools
- Principal: Rob Makreel
- Grades: 9, 10, 11, 12
- Enrollment: Approximately 750 (as of 2010)
- Colours: Green and white
- Mascot: Phoenix
- Communities served: Bragg Creek, Springbank, Redwood Meadows
- Feeder schools: Springbank Middle School, Banded Peak School
- Website: springhs.rockyview.ab.ca
- Last updated: 21 September 2026

Springbank Community High School is a public senior high school in Springbank, Alberta, Canada. Located on the west side of the city of Calgary, the school provides programming to students in grades nine to twelve from the communities of Bragg Creek, Springbank, Redwood Meadows and parts of Calgary’s western edge.

The school falls under the jurisdiction of Rocky View Schools.

The high school shares a location with the Springbank Park For All Seasons which provides sports facilities including skating and curling.

== History ==
The original 2,495 m^{2} high school was a one-storey building built in 1975. In 1980, two small additions comprising 521.6 m^{2} were added to provide CTS (Career and Technology Studies) and Home Economics space.

In 1994, major new additions and modernization took place to provide permanent classroom space with reuse of some existing portables on site. The new addition consisted of 3317 m^{2} of library, science, classroom and physical education space. In 1990, four portables were relocated to the site and a new connecting corridor was added in the 1994 renovation (total portable and link area approximately 500 m^{2}). In 1999, four more portables were added with an additional area of 367 m^{2}. In 2001, two additional portables were relocated to the site for an additional 188.5 m^{2}. The total area of the current school building is 7,882.1 m^{2} and replacement cost in 2006 was estimated to be 13.8 million dollars.

== Athletics ==
The school competes and participates in the South Central Zone of the Alberta Schools Athletic Association. It has membership in the Rocky View Sports Association., and follows its guidelines and policies. Student athletes participate as Springbank Phoenix.

== Community ==
The school is located south of the Transcanada Highway, near Calaway Park. Its feeder school, Springbank Middle School is also located just north of the school. Its other feeder school is Banded Peak School, located in Bragg Creek.

== Notable alumni ==
- Jann Arden – singer-songwriter
- Joe Colborne – Calgary Flames. Drafted 16th overall to Boston Bruins in 2008.
- Kiesza – singer-songwriter
- Cody Ko – YouTube and Vine personality, with 5 million subscribers on YouTube. He is also one-half of the Tiny Meat Gang duo.
- Josh Morrissey – NHL defenseman, drafted 13th overall to the Winnipeg Jets in 2013.
- Michael Sametz, paralympic bronze medalist

== Principals ==
- 1988–1992 — Jake Desormeaux
- 1992–2000 — David Noseworthy
- 2000–2004 — Alf Gould
- 2004–2008 — Mark Davidson
- 2008–2013 — Leslie Collings
- 2013–2014 — Karen Dittrick
- 2014–2016 — Pam Davidson
- 2016–2020 — Jeff Chalmers
- 2020–2024 — Darrell Lonsberry
- 2024–present — Rob Makreel

== Events ==
- Phoenix Fest ("Western Week" prior to 1997), a week-long student festival hosted by the Student Council. Includes a pancake breakfast, mini chuckwagon races and other school spirit activities.
- Grad Fashion Show (held in April/May of each year), and Casino Night (January/February of each year), to raise funds to offset the cost of commencement activities. These are hosted by the Graduation Committee.
- Fashion Show is considered to be the largest, and most widely anticipated school event in the area each year. It is hosted by the Graduation Committee. Most Grade 12 students participate in Fashion Show.
- In recent years, due to Rockyview regulations, the Casino Night has been replaced with a silent auction/talent and awards night held in the late fall. (2008, Masquerade Gala)
