= Calaway Park =

Amusement park and campground in Alberta, Canada

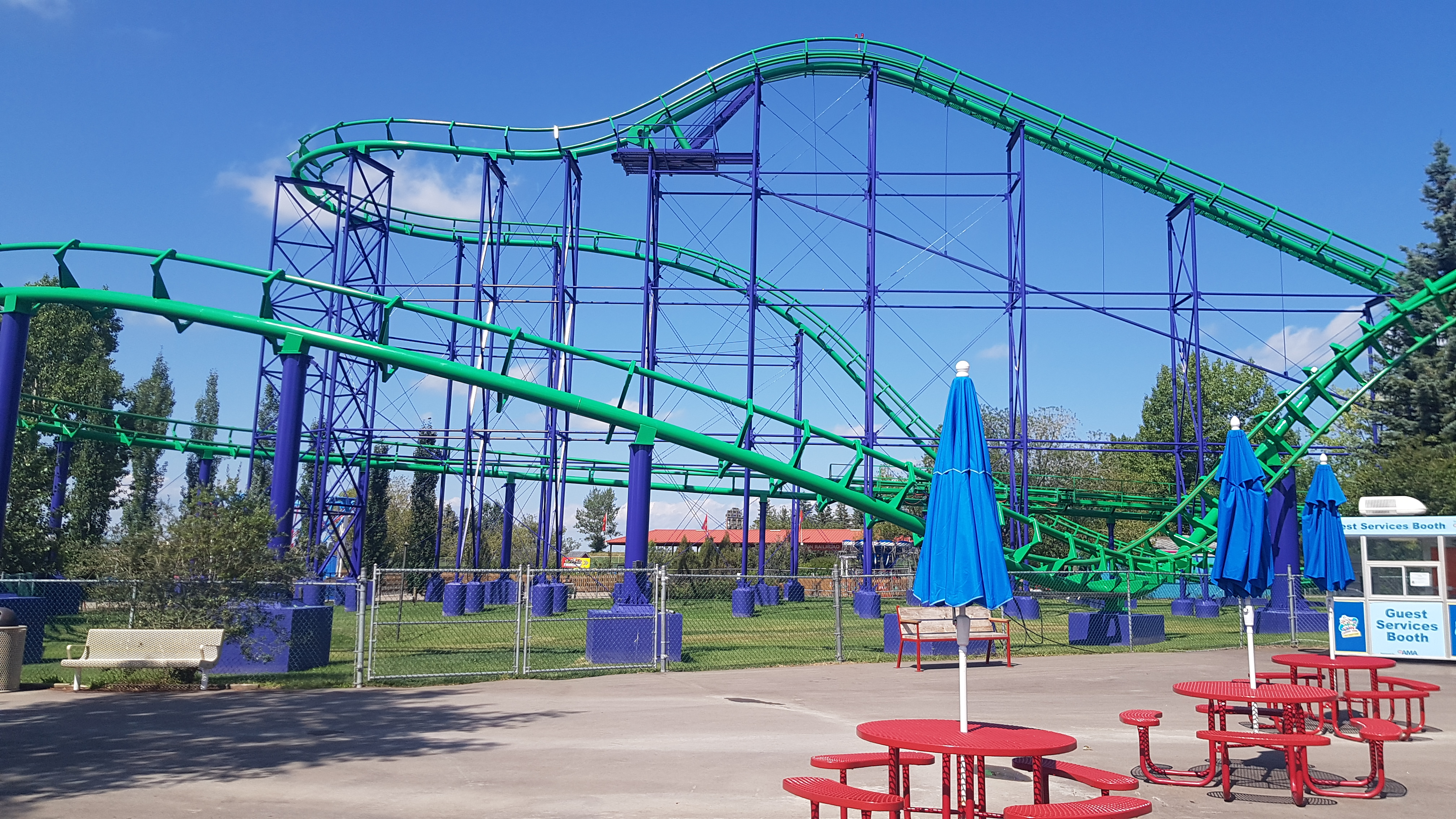
- Interactive map of Calaway Park
- Location: Springbank, Alberta, Canada
- Coordinates: 51°05′11″N 114°21′28″W
- Status: Operating
- Opened: June 26, 1982; 44 years ago
- Owner: Dena Dixon
- General manager: Bob Williams
- Slogan: Just For Fun
- Operating season: May–October
- Area: 65 hectares (160 acres) (Note: The amusement park only sprawls out across 36 hectares (90 acres).)

Attractions
- Total: 32
- Roller coasters: 3
- Website: www.calawaypark.com

Calaway Park is an amusement park and campground in Springbank, Alberta, Canada. The park occupies approximately 160 acres (65 ha) of land, although the amusement park only occupies 90 acres (36 ha) of it. The park is western Canada's largest amusement park, and is situated approximately 4 kilometres (2.5 mi) west of Calgary's city limits.

The park was conceived in 1979, with initial plans having the park named Flintstone Fun Park, after The Flintstones animated sitcom. However, the park's owners changed the park's name to Calaway Park several months before it opened to the public in 1982. The park presently holds several attractions such as carnival games and 32 amusement rides, including three roller coasters.

== History ==
The park was created by John McAfee, a former Red Deer lawyer, and 15 other investors from British Columbia, Alberta, and Ontario. Around 1979, the group paid $500,000 to Hanna-Barbera Productions for the licensing rights to the characters and locations in The Flintstones. While the original TV show ended in 1966, various Saturday morning series continued the basic plot lines, including The New Fred and Barney Show (1979) and The Flintstone Comedy Show. In addition to the Flintstones theme, a Victorian motif was planned for the park; similar to the Grande World Exposition of 1890 in Canada's Wonderland, which opened in 1981. It was presumed by park founders that parents' entrance fees, along with food and gift purchases, would pay operating costs.

Originally planned as Flintstone Fun Park, the project was to cost $8 million; costs "mushroomed" during an energy and real estate boom. The park cost $25 million, including $3 million for the primary corkscrew roller coaster.

=== Developmental struggles ===
On 16 October 1979, Municipal District of Rocky View No. 44 councillors voted 6 to 1 approve the Flintstone Fun Park, the opposing vote coming from the Springbank councillor. The approval came after council sat as the Development Appeal Board over a six-week period, and included a field-trip to "similar" parks in the United States. During hearings, residents submitted that it would ruin their rural lifestyle, while the Calgary Regional Planning Commission suggested it would not comply with established planning documents. The approval came with the requirements that there be a distance between it and two nearby schools, that the park and parking lot be in the north end of the property, that development beyond the initial 60 acres (of a total 143 acres) would require further development application and approval, and that the park comply with a noise provision. The park was to have all layout plans, landscaping, landscaping materials, operation practices, and entrance and exit signs meet with M.D. approval. Bill Copithorne, councillor for the Springbank area, suggested to the media that conditions weren't specific enough for residents.

The Alberta Appeal Court (AAC) ordered a second hearing by the council, again sitting as the Development Appeal Board. The hearing took place in June 1980; three of the councillors were disqualified by the AAC for having visited the American parks previously. The developers argued that they felt 90 per cent of area residents wouldn't object once they visited the park and realized they'd be "proud" of it. If approved, the developers suggested that they would welcome a committee "mostly of opponents" to have a say in planning the park. Locals objected to a proposed fake mountain. McAfee denied knowledge of a statement of company objectives, which included the creation of an on-site hotel. Both sides argued whether the park met the definition of a country recreation centre.

The Flintstone Fun Park developers felt 200,000 people would visit in the first year, and somewhere between 400,000 and 500,000 annually after a decade or two. By this point, the expectation was that there would be a four-lane overpass above Springbank Road, to lessen the traffic disruption. McAfee said the company did not expect to be profitable in the first few years. Approval was given with conditions.

A cement truck depot was seeking to move into Springbank at the same time, it too was opposed. It was blocked quickly on the grounds that the regional plan limited industry in rural areas.

Nine land owners filed a motion in the Alberta Appeal Court in mid-July, seeking permission to challenge the ruling on the grounds that council acted contrary to both a local by-law and the Calgary regional plan, didn't adequately explain its decision, and overstepped its powers by attaching conditions.

Without the ability to ask the Alberta Planning Board (APB) themselves, the Springbank Action Group (SAG) asked in February 1981 that the Calgary Regional Planning Commission or Rocky View school board refer the matter to the APB, using recent legislation that allowed it to settle the situation. Once either organisation had brought the matter to the APB, the SAG would take over from them and represent the opposition. SAG would probably concede if the APB voted against them, but would be able to appeal the ruling in the courts should the APB rule against the park.

With its major challenges out of the way, Flintstone Fun Park changed its name to Calaway Park, and was under development by January 1982. The new name is a reference to the park's location away from the city of Calgary, combining the 'Cal' from the nearby city's name with the word 'away'.

Bill Copithorne, the sole dissenting vote in the Municipal District's initial approval, was now the Rocky View reeve. Talking at an 11 January 1982, town hall meeting organized by the new citizen's group Partners in Progress, Copithorne warned that further development would be inevitable along the Trans-Canada Highway corridor. He called for a new general plan to ensure that further additions would be "high-class". A proposed commercial strip would include a motel and RV campground. The director of the Calgary Regional Planning Commission disagreed with Copithorne's statement of "inevitability"; a hearing on the motel and campground were scheduled for 22 January. Rocky View's planning director noted that a commercial zone might not happen, and commercial development in Springbank might happen away from the highway as well. Simultaneously, Municipal Affairs Minister Marvin Moore was considering further Municipal District representation for the Springbank and Bearspaw areas, a request triggered by residents after high population growth.

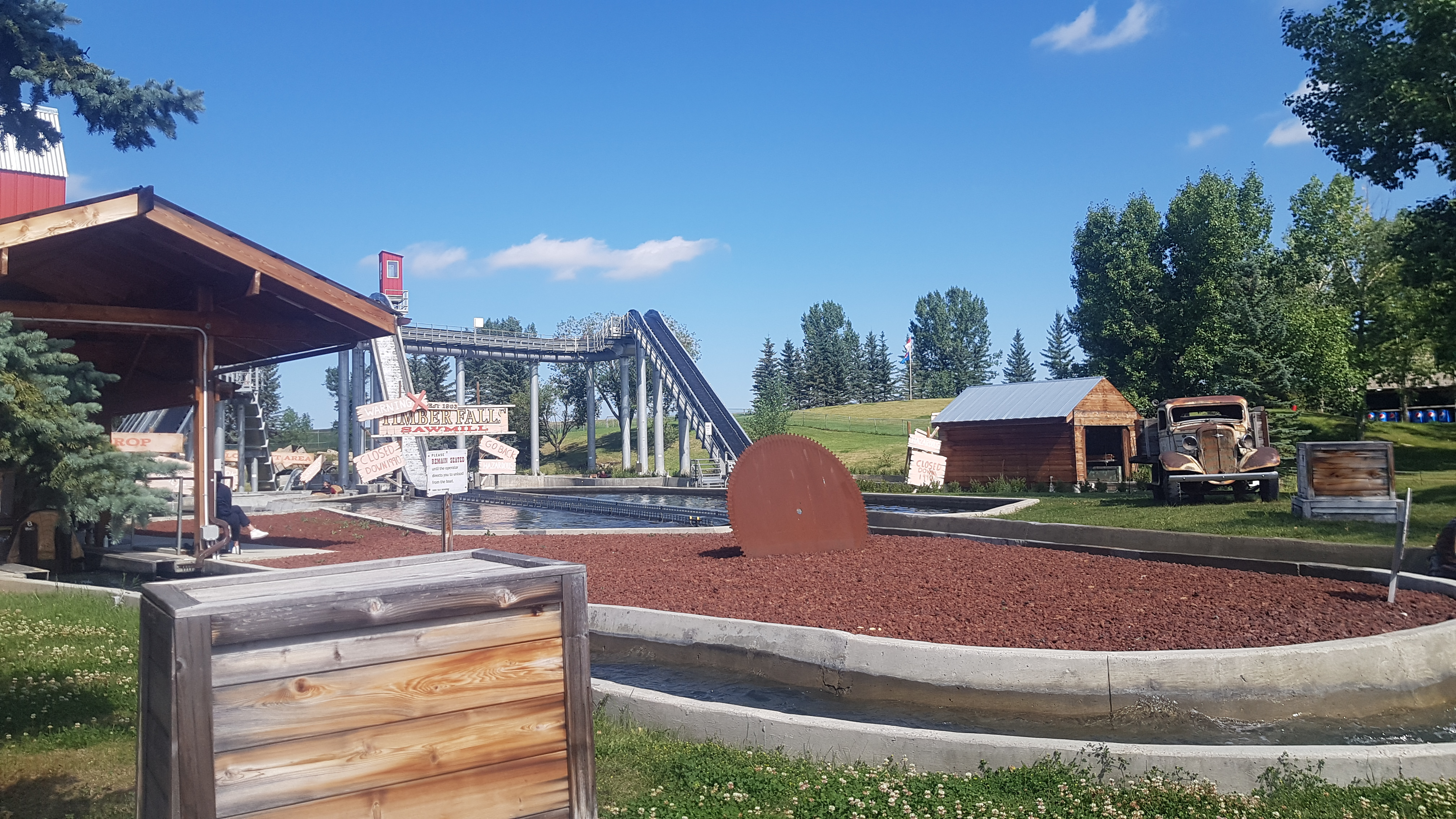
The log ride, Timber Falls in Calaway Park.

Area resident Mary Luzi asked the area government to block the creation of a 31-metre-high rollercoaster; this was unsuccessful. McAfee, who lived a "half-mile away" from the park site, admitted he would be displeased if he could see a corkscrew roller coaster from his house. The coaster was painted in earth tones, to blend in with the foothills. Said Luzi: "What does that do when there are still purple and red roofs, along with oranges, yellows and blues?" Trees, bushes, and landscaping were to block the lines of sight.

=== Opening and financial difficulties ===
By opening day in 1982, the boom in Calgary had passed. The city was mired in recession and forecasting a decrease in population for the first time in a century. Unlike in the United States, there were many government-supported rival attractions, such as the Calgary Zoo and Calgary Stampede.

Initial entrance fee to the park was a "hefty" $11.95, with unlimited access to attractions. This is standard within the industry; all attractions were available with one ticket at Disneyland as of June 1982. Canadians objected to this simplified plan. The 14 attractions included The Flintstones themed attractions, the Corkscrew roller coaster, a petting zoo, and Cinema 180; entertainment included costumed characters of the Flintstones. American Kent Lamasters was hired as general manager.

By 1983, the park was facing 17 lawsuits totaling $1 million, including from Batra Construction Ltd. ($772,000), Canadian Western Natural Gas, the Municipal District of Rocky View, and the Canadian federal government.

It sought help from the provincial government's Department of Tourism and Small Business. The government was not interested in the park from an equity standpoint. Alberta Opportunity Co., a Crown corporation set up to finance or assist management of viable small and medium businesses in the province, was not approached, at least in the early stage.

On 11 February 1983, the park landed in receivership, with Touche Ross Ltd. (now known as Deloitte) continuing its operations. All 17 lawsuits were stayed upon receivership.

To attempt to attain profitability, the park cut admission fees, started events, and began a $1.1 million capital expansion. All of the changes were aimed at older age groups; the child-centric Flintstones theme was considered too minor to support the large facility; dropping the licensing fees helped fund the renovations. Along with new shows and rides, a restaurant was to feature more sophisticated foods and a liquor license. The admission cut was based on general manager Lemaster's success at Silver Dollar City, doing the same while marking things up within the park. Gordon Dixon bought the park, and management reformatted the attraction as an amusement park, rather than a theme park. A third of the landscaping was lost after the first season, as their Ontario landscaper was not familiar with the dry Alberta weather conditions.

After the 1984 season ended, receiver Touche Ross ended its stay. A deal with Northland Bank went into effect during the autumn, after waiting for government approval. Northland bought the park from its original owners, selling the new company (Calalta Amusements Ltd.) back on better terms. It took over loans of $3.5 million from the Royal Bank of Canada and Bank of America Canada. They saw promise in attendance numbers, and kept the park open for 1985. (Northland itself was financially shaky, with declared loan losses of $4.5 million in 1983. Northland folded in 1985.)

=== Restructuring ===
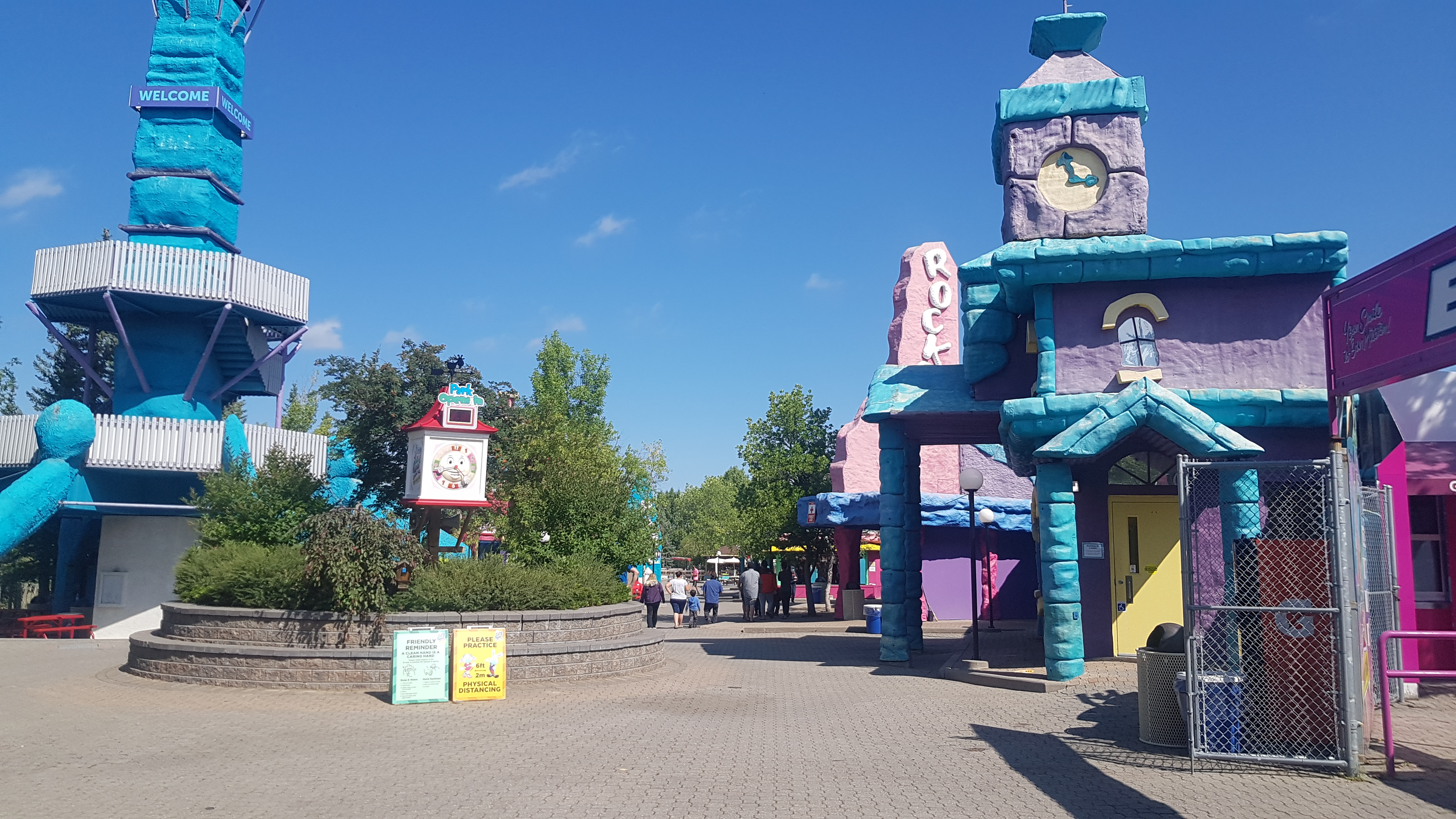
Entrance of Calaway Park.

During the off-season between 1984 and 1985, there was a rearranging of $17 million of debt, which allowed the park to return to profitability. The 1985 season saw the addition of AquaRage, Canada's only dry-wet ride. This was to replace a large log ride that was too chilly, given the climate. Concerts included Doug and the Slugs, Ozark Mountain Daredevils, and various contemporary tribute acts. By the end of their fourth season, Calaway Park turned a profit, despite 35 bad weather days, 10 above the expected average. The company continued to make loan payments to Northland as part of its five-year loan.

When the park opened in 1982, many of the buildings, merchandise, and rides were styled around licensed Hanna-Barbera characters. These can be still seen today in some of the older and colourful Flintstones-style buildings. The licensing was dropped in favour of reinvesting the funds into tangible capital projects to improve the grounds. The park has generally avoided licensing since, aside from its Theodore Tugboat soft playground. The park has paid outside licensees, including for 2009 appearances by Dora, Diego, and SpongeBob SquarePants.

Early in their career, in the 1980s, Blue Rodeo did a performance at Calaway Park; their five performance booking was poorly received by the mothers and children at the park.

In 1988 Calaway Park introduced two mascots, Jack Bunny and Jill O' Hare, who can now be seen roaming the streets of the park; The Jack and Jill Club 10th Birthday Bash! musical was presented in 2005. The club is open to season pass holders aged 3 to 12.

The park's director of marketing, Bob Williams, became known throughout the Calgary tourist attraction scene as "The Coupon King". As of 2003, the park would flood the market with 3 million coupons a year, including direct mail discounts to 800,000 households; of those mailed coupons, 70,000 are redeemed. They estimate over 75% of admissions are discounted.

=== 21st century ===
In 2001, the park developed five new acres of land of the 160 acres (0.65 km^{2}) Calaway owns. The Corkscrew Roller Coaster underwent a major transformation in 2005, including a new paint scheme, a new theme, and a new name, becoming The Vortex Roller Coaster. The Vortex roller coaster is 70 feet (21 m) tall and has two inversions. The park's gas-powered bumper boats were taken out of service, and newer environment-friendly electric powered boats featuring water squirt guns were introduced, becoming The BumperBoat Splash Challenge! Two thrill rides were also repainted and renamed that year, as the Mountain Scrambler became Adrenaline Test Zone and the family thrill ride SkyRider became the Wave Rider. Also added was Halloweekends, a five-weekend event during which the park undergoes a haunted transformation, including an updated Haunted Hotel, Freaky Food, a Spooktacular Stage Show, and many characters roaming the streets of the park.

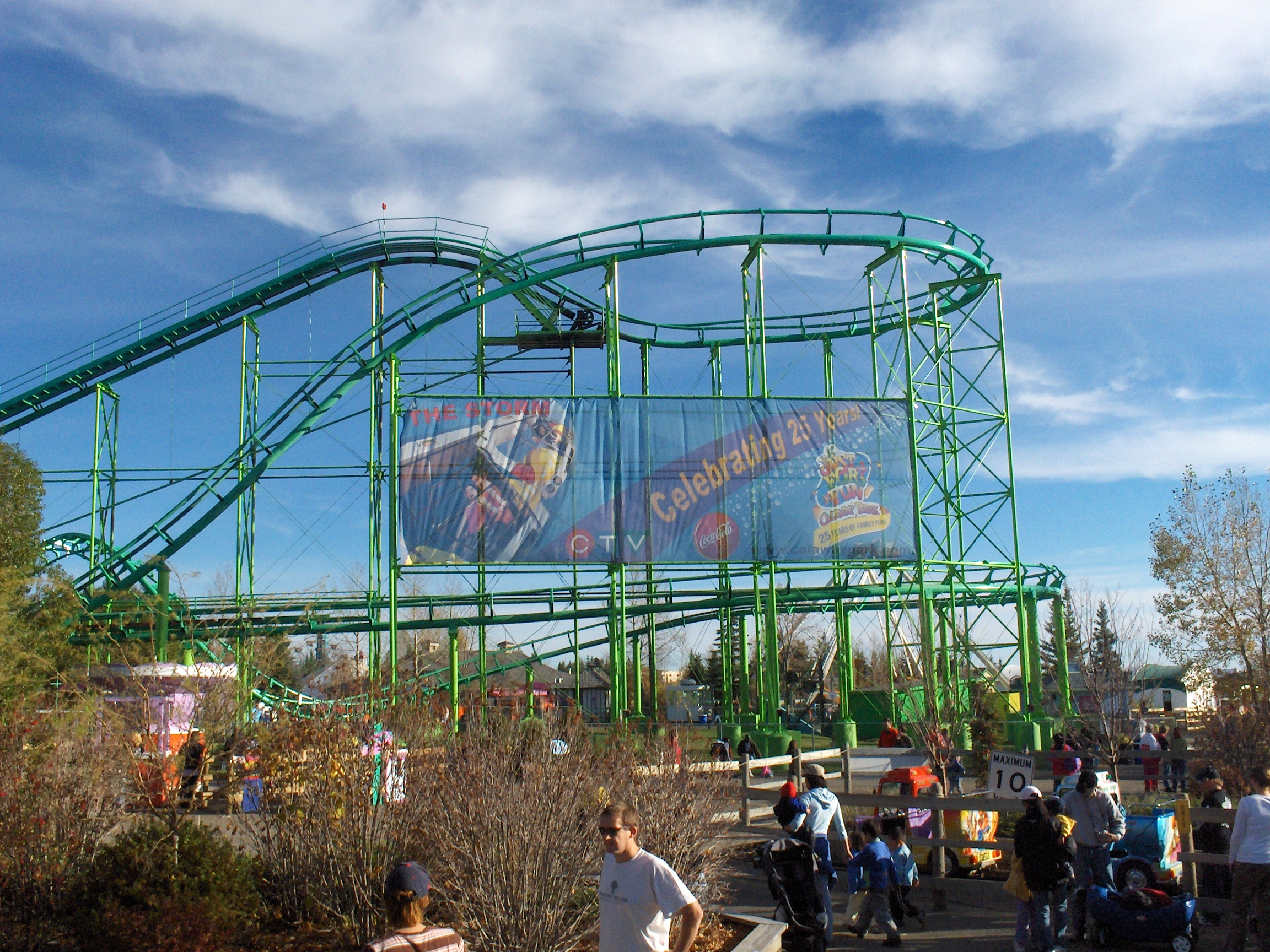
A banner hangs off Vortex commemorating the park's 25th anniversary as well as the opening of a new attraction. The Storm in October 2006.

In 2005, park management expressed interest in additional roller coasters. "Twiz & Twirl: The World's First Interactive Dual-Zone Maze" and thrill ride Chaos were added in 2005, with chair swing Swing Around taken out for next year's The Storm. The park's 25th anniversary, the next year, added The Storm: Mother Nature's Thrill Ride, children's swing ride Swirly Twirl, and U-Drive: Safety School of Motoring, a renovated Turnpike. The park entrance was renovated. Drop tower Free Fallin' replaced Topsy Turvy, swing ride The Dream Machine, ferris wheel Balloon Ascension, and Flying Ace were added in 2007. The park became a kilometre closer to Calgary in 2007 after the city expanded its borders. Family ride Tip Top was retired at the end of the season. Samba Spin was added in 2008.

In 2008, the ride SuperJet allegedly started before all children had boarded, an incident which did not result in injuries.

Mind Blaster debuted for the 30th anniversary of the park in 2011. As of late July, the park attendance was down 3%, due to a "cool wet spring". July has been "good for business", with August traditionally their busiest month.

Almost half a million visited in 2003, double the 210,000 in 1991, also doubling the in-park revenue. The 500,000 number continued as of the 2010 season. up from 575 in 2004. As of 2003, they had 65,000 season pass holders. The park had record breaking attendance in July and August. Fifty per cent of ticket sales are in the Christmas period, when Calaway does extensive marketing of its tickets as "stocking stuffers". While the park is deemed an "important" tourist draw in the Rocky View County, CrossIron Mills with its planned racetrack and casino is expected to supplant the park as the biggest draw.

Calaway and the University of Calgary offer a physics program involving roller coasters. The Calgary Cerebral Palsy Association hosts an annual "Light Up a Child's Life" event at the park, free for mentally or physically challenged children and their parents.

In 2013, RioCan Real Estate Investment Trust and Tanger Factory Outlet Centers announced the intended Q3 purchase of a 35-acre parcel of land, "with the intention to develop the land into an outlet centre of approximately 350,000 square feet." The sale would be to surplus land, not the park itself. Tourism Calgary reported that numbers at attractions were strong in summer 2013, including those from out of town, following the 2013 Alberta floods.

== Grounds ==
Calaway Park occupies approximately 65 hectares (160 acres) of land in Springbank, Alberta. However, the amusement park and most of its operations is sprawled out across 36 hectares (90 acres) of land. Calaway Park is western Canada's largest amusement park. In addition to an amusement park, Calaway Park also operates a campground with 104 camp spaces.

=== Attractions ===
Calaway Park holds a number of attractions including 20 carnival games. In 2019, the amusement park opened a splash pad. In addition to interactive attractions the park also contains 32 amusement rides, including three roller coasters. Outside of that, they have a troupe of live performers who perform shows written and produced by Chris Thompson, the park's entertainment director. They produce four to six shows annually, targeted at families with children 2 to 14.

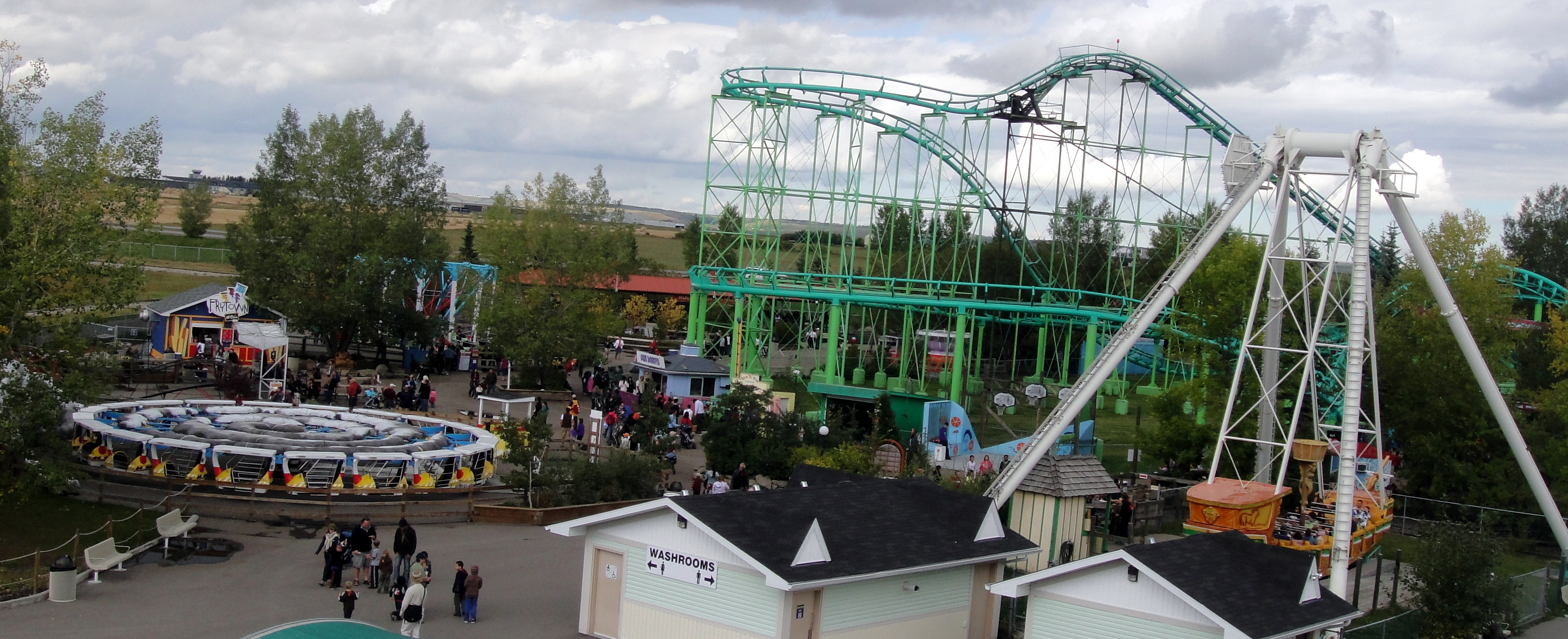
Several amusement rides at Calaway Park in 2010

Roller coasters
Name	Ride manufacturer	Year opened	Type or model	Height requirement	Ref.
Bumble Blast	Gosetto	2019	Figure 8 spinning roller coaster	Over 48 inches (120 cm) (Note: Those between 42 and 48 inches (110 and 120 cm) may ride when accompanied by an adult.)	
Mini Express	Zamperla	2013	Wild Mouse roller coaster	Over 36 inches (91 cm)	
Vortex	Arrow Dynamics	1982	Corkscrew roller coaster	Over 48 inches (120 cm)	

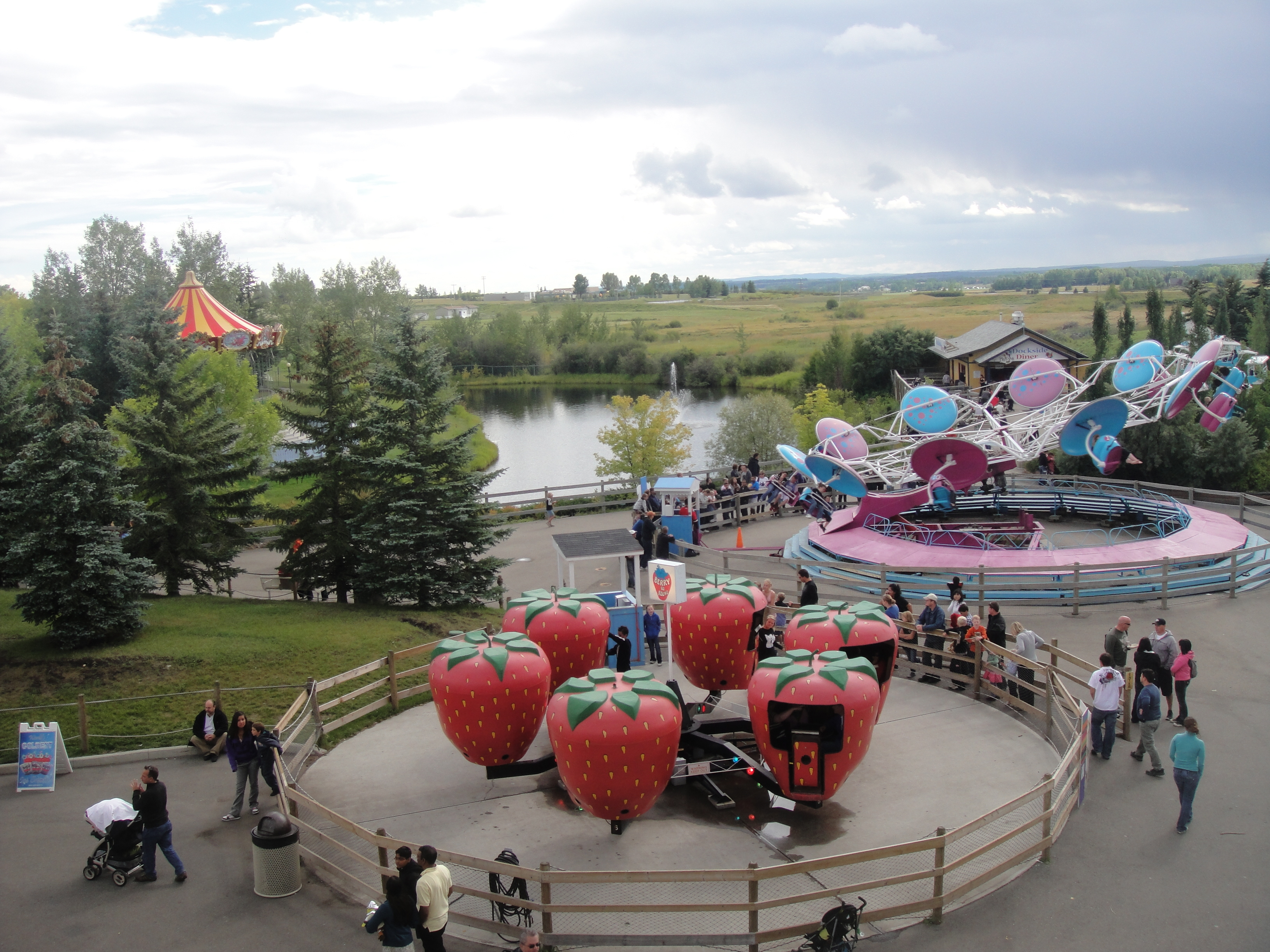
Several children's rides at Calaway Park in 2010. The ride in the foreground was later rethemed and renamed Dizzy Dragons.

Other amusement rides
Name	Type or model	Height requirement	Ref.
Aeromax		Over 42 inches (110 cm) (Note: Those under the minimum height limit may ride if accompanied by an adult.)	
Adrenaline Test Zone	Troika	Over 48 inches (120 cm) (Note: Those between 36 and 48 inches (91 and 122 cm) may ride when accompanied by an adult.)	
Air Gliders		Over 48 inches (120 cm)	
Balloon Ascension		Over 48 inches (120 cm)	
Baja Buggies		Over 32 inches (81 cm)	
Biplanes Stunt School		36 to 54 inches (91 to 137 cm)	
Boulder Bumpers	Bumper cars	36 to 52 inches (91 to 132 cm)	
Bumper Boats	Bumper boats	Over 52 inches (130 cm) (Note: Those between 42 and 52 inches (110 and 130 cm) may ride when accompanied by an adult.)	
Carousel	Carousel	Over 42 inches (110 cm)	
Chaos		Over 52 inches (130 cm)	
Dizzy Dragons		Over 46 inches (120 cm) (Note: Those between 28 and 46 inches (71 and 117 cm) may ride when accompanied by an adult.)	
Dodgem	Bumper cars	Over 52 inches (130 cm)	
Dream Machine	Swing ride	Over 46 inches (120 cm) (Note: Those between 42 and 46 inches (110 and 120 cm) may ride when accompanied by an adult.)	
Eggs		Over 42 inches (110 cm)	
Flying Ace	Pirate ship	Over 46 inches (120 cm) (Note: Those between 38 and 46 inches (97 and 117 cm) may ride when accompanied by an adult.)	
Free Fallin'	Drop tower	Over 46 inches (120 cm)	
Hilltop Railway	Train ride	32 to 54 inches (81 to 137 cm)	
Ocean Motion	Pirate ship	Over 54 inches (140 cm) (Note: Those between 40 and 54 inches (100 and 140 cm) may ride when accompanied by an adult.)	
Rocky Mtn Railroad	Train ride	Over 42 inches (110 cm)	
Samba Spin		Over 42 inches (110 cm)	
Sky Wynder	Drop tower	Over 38 inches (97 cm)	
SkyClimber		Over 48 inches (120 cm)	
Storm	Enterprise	Over 54 inches (140 cm)	
Super Trucks		32 to 54 inches (81 to 137 cm)	
Swirly Twirl	Swing ride	36 to 54 inches (91 to 137 cm)	
Timber Falls	Log flume	Over 54 inches (140 cm) (Note: Those between 36 and 54 inches (91 and 137 cm) may ride when accompanied by an adult.)	
Tot Yachts		28 to 54 inches (71 to 137 cm)	
U Drive		Over 38 inches (97 cm)	
Wave Rider		Over 48 inches (120 cm)	

==== Removed attractions ====
Cosmic Spin was a former ride that was removed, that rotated continuously on a hydraulic arm that raises you up; which was also formerly known as Round-em' up. Another ride that was removed was Mind Blaster, a ride that rolls back and forth and up and down as the circular carriage that the guests are seated in spins rapidly.

Other removed attractions include a ball pit known as Ball Crawl and a soft playground known as Freddie Fireboat. Theodore Tugboat was a former soft playground at the park that was based on Theodore Tugboat, a Canadian children's series. Before its removal, Theodore the Tugboat play area saw multiple reports of young children receiving second degree burns due to a combination of the temperature of black rubber mats sitting in direct sunlight and Calaway Park's policy that children should not wear shoes on the play structure.

== Operations ==
Calaway Park staff includes 40 full-time staff and over 650 seasonal employees, Thousands of applications are received annually, as of the 2009 season. Each employee receives a minimum of 20 general training hours, and 5 to 12 department training hours. About two-thirds of all guest comments about employees are positive. In 2000, the Conference Board of Canada named the park the "Top Employer of Youth" in Canada. Super Jet was a former powered roller coaster built by Wisdom Rides that was installed at the amusement park in 2002, and removed in 2012.

Department managers, as of 2003, were allowed to run their operation as if "separate businesses", to give a more entrepreneurial drive. Permanent staff are encouraged to actively participate in the International Association of Amusement Parks and Attractions, to gain new ideas, and ensure the park doesn't remain creatively isolated. In 2010, it won "Best Reward and Recognition Program (Facility under 1 million)" from IAAPA's Human Resources Excellence Awards.
