= Springbank, Alberta =

Rural community in Canada

Location of Springbank in Alberta

Springbank is a rural community in southern Alberta in Rocky View County. It is located immediately west of the City of Calgary, east of Highway 22, south of the Bow River and north of the rural community of Elbow Valley. Both the Trans-Canada Highway and Lower Springbank Road (north of Highway 8) connect Springbank to Calgary.

Springbank consists mostly of country residential acreages developed with estate homes and features the Springbank Airport. The adjacent rural communities of Bearspaw to the north, across the Bow River, and Elbow Valley to the south, across the Elbow River, also consist mostly of country residential acreages. The urban community of Harmony is adjacent to the Springbank Airport to the west.

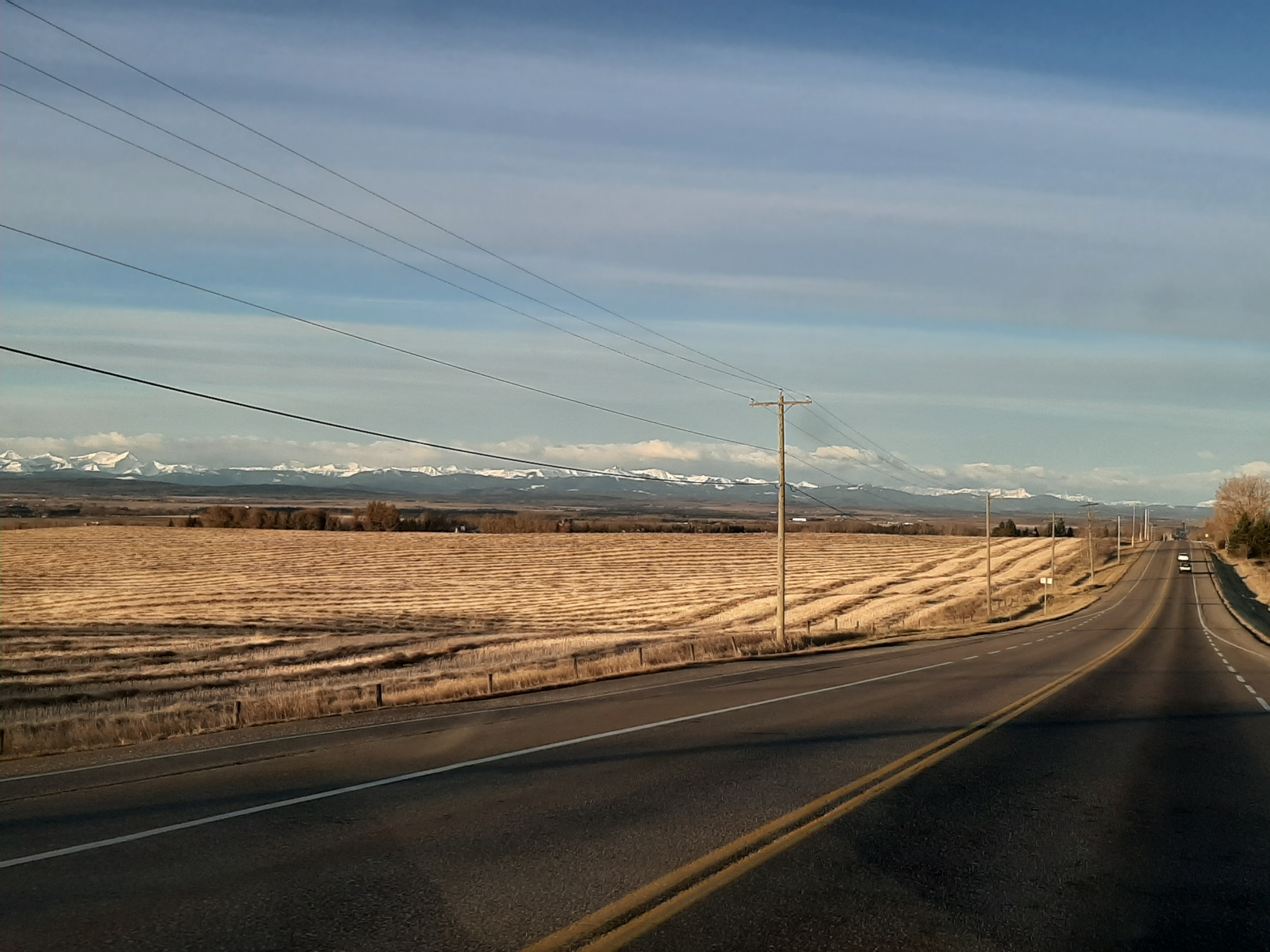
Looking west from Springbank Road in Springbank, Alberta

Eastern portions of Springbank have been annexed by Calgary since the early 1980s. These portions are now developed with the Calgary neighbourhoods of Springbank Hill, Aspen Woods, West Springs, Cougar Ridge, Crestmont and Valley Ridge.

Springbank is named after Springbank Creek which flows southeast into the Elbow River. The descriptive name for this creek was first applied to the municipal district in 1918 (MD of Springbank). It was first given as a school district name on July 11, 1887 because of the numerous springs breaking out of the sides of the lesser coulees all over the district. Most of the early settlers located near the springs.

== Attractions ==
Calaway Park, an outdoor family amusement park, is located in Springbank.

Golf courses in Springbank include the Pinebrook Golf Club, Glencoe Golf and Country Club, Springbank Links Golf Course and Elbow Springs Golf Course.

== Transportation ==
The Springbank Airport is located within Springbank. It was the 9th busiest airport in Canada in 2022 in terms of total aircraft movements.

== Climate ==
Springbank, Alberta is on the border of a semi-monsoonal humid continental climate (Dwb) and a semi-monsoonal subarctic climate (Dwc) with the Koppen classification system.

Climate data for Springbank Hill (Calgary/Springbank Airport) WMO ID: 71860; coordinates 51°06′11″N 114°22′28″W; elevation: 1,200.9 m (3,940 ft); 1981–2010 normals
Month	Jan	Feb	Mar	Apr	May	Jun	Jul	Aug	Sep	Oct	Nov	Dec	Year
Record high humidex	15.7	21.3	22.9	25.7	30.6	31.9	34.1	34.0	31.0	26.4	20.5	17.1	34.1
Record high °C (°F)	16.5 (61.7)	22.1 (71.8)	23.8 (74.8)	26.5 (79.7)	33.0 (91.4)	31.0 (87.8)	33.8 (92.8)	32.1 (89.8)	30.6 (87.1)	27.1 (80.8)	20.4 (68.7)	17.9 (64.2)	33.8 (92.8)
Mean daily maximum °C (°F)	−1.8 (28.8)	0.0 (32.0)	3.9 (39.0)	10.5 (50.9)	15.3 (59.5)	18.8 (65.8)	22.2 (72.0)	21.2 (70.2)	17.0 (62.6)	11.0 (51.8)	2.3 (36.1)	−0.6 (30.9)	10.0 (50.0)
Daily mean °C (°F)	−8.2 (17.2)	−6.7 (19.9)	−2.7 (27.1)	3.4 (38.1)	8.1 (46.6)	12.1 (53.8)	14.8 (58.6)	13.7 (56.7)	9.5 (49.1)	3.9 (39.0)	−3.8 (25.2)	−7 (19)	3.1 (37.5)
Mean daily minimum °C (°F)	−14.5 (5.9)	−13.4 (7.9)	−9.2 (15.4)	−3.8 (25.2)	0.9 (33.6)	5.4 (41.7)	7.4 (45.3)	6.2 (43.2)	1.9 (35.4)	−3.3 (26.1)	−9.9 (14.2)	−13.3 (8.1)	−3.8 (25.2)
Record low °C (°F)	−42.8 (−45.0)	−41.6 (−42.9)	−36.3 (−33.3)	−21.7 (−7.1)	−14.1 (6.6)	−6.1 (21.0)	−0.1 (31.8)	−5.9 (21.4)	−9.8 (14.4)	−29.1 (−20.4)	−36.5 (−33.7)	−41.6 (−42.9)	−42.8 (−45.0)
Record low wind chill	−56.0	−56.0	−48.0	−27.0	−20.0	−10.0	−4.0	−8.0	−14.0	−38.0	−48.0	−57.0	−57.0
Average precipitation mm (inches)	9.9 (0.39)	11.5 (0.45)	17.6 (0.69)	25.4 (1.00)	61.1 (2.41)	106.7 (4.20)	66.9 (2.63)	78.0 (3.07)	50.3 (1.98)	16.3 (0.64)	16.3 (0.64)	9.8 (0.39)	469.8 (18.49)
Average rainfall mm (inches)	0.2 (0.01)	0.0 (0.0)	0.4 (0.02)	9.3 (0.37)	49.5 (1.95)	106.7 (4.20)	66.9 (2.63)	78.0 (3.07)	45.5 (1.79)	7.0 (0.28)	2.4 (0.09)	0.3 (0.01)	366.2 (14.42)
Average snowfall cm (inches)	12.7 (5.0)	14.7 (5.8)	21.7 (8.5)	19.0 (7.5)	12.4 (4.9)	0.0 (0.0)	0.1 (0.0)	0.0 (0.0)	5.3 (2.1)	11.6 (4.6)	17.4 (6.9)	12.4 (4.9)	127.3 (50.2)
Average precipitation days (≥ 0.2 mm)	5.8	5.7	7.5	8.1	11.6	14.5	12.8	12.4	9.4	7.2	6.0	5.3	106.3
Average rainy days (≥ 0.2 mm)	0.17	0.04	0.48	3.5	9.7	14.5	12.8	12.3	8.8	4.3	0.91	0.23	67.73
Average snowy days (≥ 0.2 cm)	6.0	5.9	7.6	5.8	3.0	0.0	0.09	0.05	1.4	3.9	5.9	5.4	45.0
Average relative humidity (%)	58.6	56.0	50.3	43.3	45.7	50.8	48.2	49.2	47.8	46.5	57.1	60.4	51.2
Source: Environment Canada

== Education ==
Schools located in Springbank, operated by Rocky View Schools, include:

- Elbow Valley Elementary School (kindergarten to grade 4);
- Springbank Middle School (grades 5 to 8); and
- Springbank Community High School (grades 9 to 12).

The high school is located within the Springbank Park For All Seasons, which also includes an ice arena and a curling rink.

Private schools in the area are Webber Academy, Rundle College, and Edge School for Athletes.

== Shopping ==
Springbank has a business park and shopping area located along the Trans-Canada Highway south of Highway 1 between Range Roads 32 and 35. The area has a few businesses including a bottle recycling depot, a seasonal farmers market, pet hospital, truck/RV repair shop and some commercial offices.

== Notable residents ==
- Jann Arden, musician
- Lanny McDonald, former professional hockey player
- Darryl Sutter, head coach of the Calgary Flames
- Roman Turek, former professional hockey player
