= Bow Valley High School =

Location
- 2000 River Heights Drive; Cochrane, Alberta, T4C 1Y8; Canada; 51.165°N 114.454°W

Information
- School type: Province, High School
- Founded: 2001
- School board: Rocky View Schools
- Principal: Shane Dempster
- Grades: 9-12
- Enrollment: 573
- Colours: Blue and Gold
- Mascot: Bobcat
- Team name: Bow Valley Bobcats
- Website: bowvalley.rockyview.ab.ca

Bow Valley High School is a public secondary school located in the township of Cochrane, Alberta, Canada. The school falls under the jurisdiction of the Rocky View Schools. The school's enrollment is approximately 800 to 900 students, in grades 9 through 12. Its mascot is the Bobcat.

== Athletics ==
The Bow Valley Bobcats have membership in the Rocky View Sports Association, and compete and participate in the South Central Zone of the Alberta Schools Athletic Association.

== Expansion and renovation (2024–2026) ==
Beginning in 2024, Bow Valley High School underwent a major expansion and modernization project intended to increase student capacity and upgrade learning facilities. The project was designed to add approximately 500 student spaces and increase the school’s total capacity to about 1,425 students.

The work was completed in multiple phases. Phase one began in June 2024 and focused primarily on external construction activities, including site preparation, installation of safety fencing, and signage. Phase two commenced in early 2025 and involved work on the learning commons and interior courtyard. Phase three began in mid-2025 and included the construction of new classroom space and modernization of existing instructional areas. The school’s existing gymnasium was demolished in July 2025 as part of the expansion, with construction beginning on a larger replacement facility and expanded music spaces. The project also included upgrades to electrical and mechanical systems and the development of specialized learning areas such as fashion, cosmetology, and fitness facilities. During the 2025–26 school year, the gymnasium remained unavailable due to demolition and construction. Physical education classes were relocated to the SLS Centre, with students transported by bus, and athletic teams used gymnasiums at feeder schools for practices and competitions while the school’s fitness and weight rooms remained operational.

Construction activities caused temporary disruptions to school operations. Some areas of the building were closed or had limited access, and certain programs were relocated during various stages of the project.

=== 2025–26 school year opening disruption ===
The start of the 2025–26 school year was affected by delays related to the ongoing modernization project. Due to construction readiness issues, the school did not open for in-person learning as scheduled at the beginning of September 2025. Students participated in temporary alternative learning arrangements before in-person classes resumed the following week

== Incidents ==
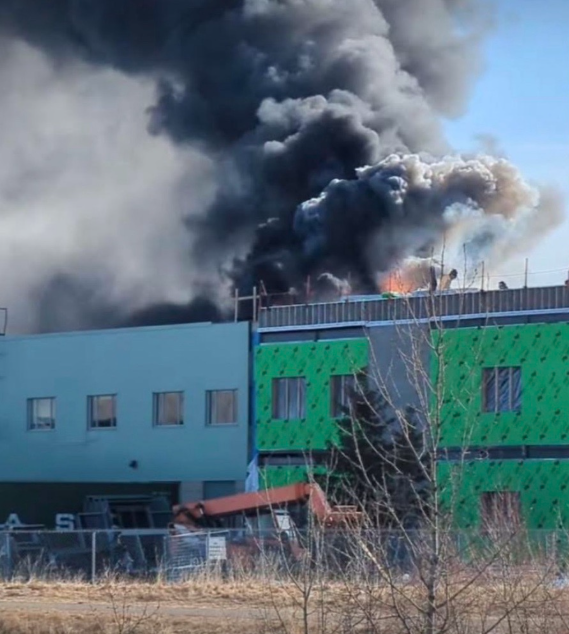
Cochrane Fire Services and Rocky View County Fire Services responded to a fire that occurred during roofing work at Bow Valley High School.

=== 2025 fire ===
On March 19, 2025, a fire occurred at Bow Valley High School during roofing work associated with the expansion project. Emergency crews from both Cochrane and Rocky View County responded to the incident and contained the fire. Students were swiftly evacuated, and no serious injuries were reported. The fire was attributed to construction activity on the roof of the expansion area. The fire was rumored to have originated from a Tiger Torch Igniting a vapor barrier and containers of solvent.
