= Cochrane, Alberta =

Cochrane
- Town
- Town of Cochrane
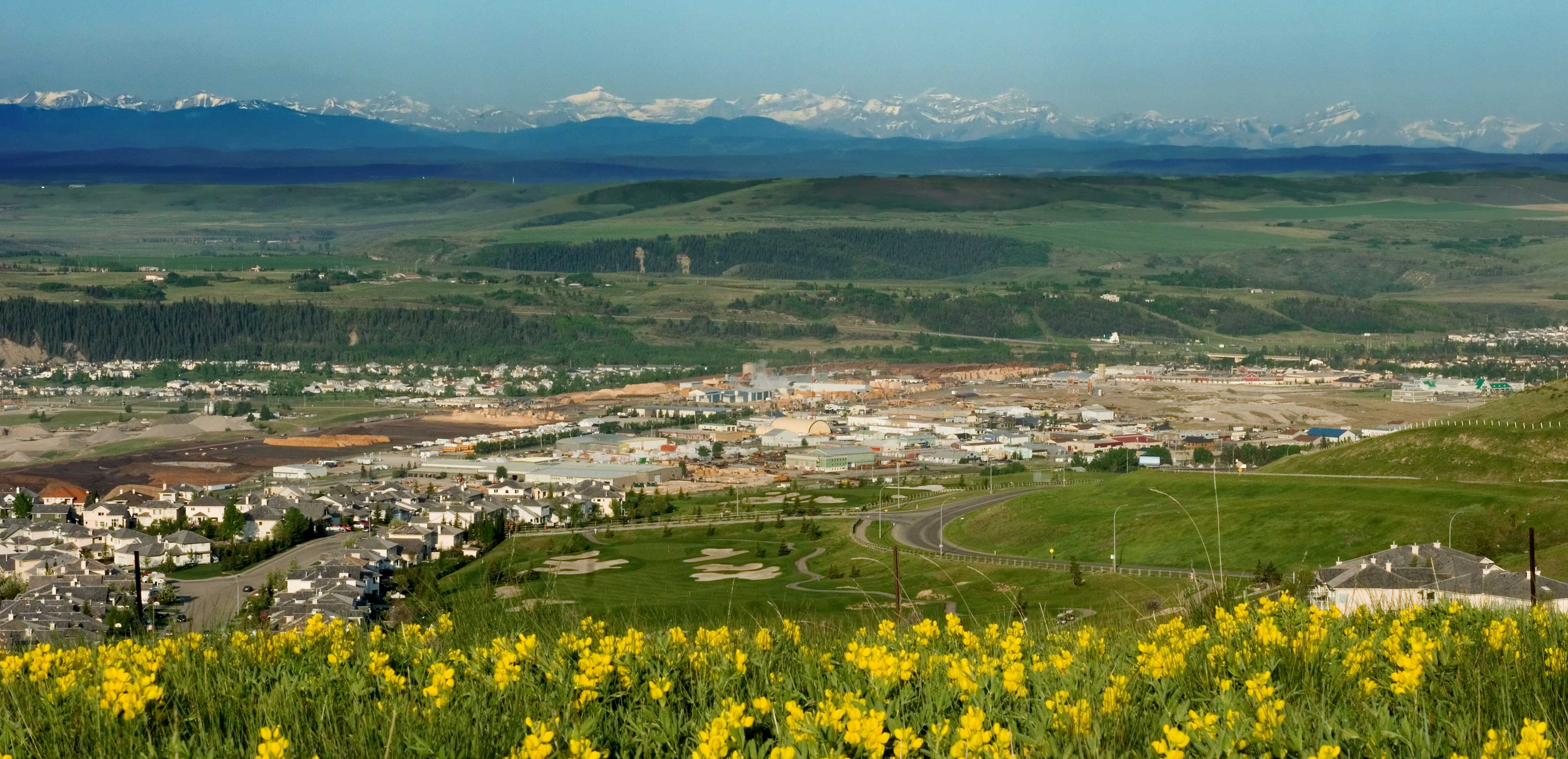
- Overview of Cochrane

- Motto: How the West is Now
- Boundaries of Cochrane

- Location in Rocky View County Location in Alberta Cochrane (Canada)
- Coordinates: 51.189°N 114.467°W
- Country: Canada
- Province: Alberta
- Metropolitan area: Calgary
- Planning region: South Saskatchewan
- Municipal district: Rocky View County
- Incorporated
  - Village: June 17, 1903
  - Town: February 15, 1971

Government
  - Mayor: Morgan Nagel
  - Governing body: Cochrane Town Council: Marni Fedeyko; Paul Singh; Tara McFadden; Laura McDonald; Patrick Wilson; Mikayla Gayle
  - CAO: Drew Hyndman
  - MP: Blake Richards (Conservative)
  - MLA: Peter Guthrie (Progressive Tory)

Area (2021)
  - Land: 31.58 km^{2} (12.19 sq mi)
- Elevation: 1,159 m (3,802 ft)

Population (2021)
  - Total: 32,199
  - Density: 1,019.5/km^{2} (2,640/sq mi)
- Demonym: Cochranite
- Time zone: UTC−06:00 (Alberta Time)
- Forward sortation area: T4C
- Area codes: 403, 587, 825, 368
- Highways: Highway 1A; Highway 22 Cowboy Trail
- Railways: Canadian Pacific Kansas City
- Website: www.cochrane.ca

Cochrane (/ˈkɒkrən/ KOK-rən) is a town in the Calgary Metropolitan Region of Alberta, Canada. The town is located 18 km (11 mi) west of the Calgary city limits along Highway 1A. Cochrane is one of the fastest-growing communities in Canada, and with a population of 32,199 in 2021, it is one of the largest towns in Alberta. It is part of Calgary's census metropolitan area and a member community of the Calgary Metropolitan Region Board (CMRB). The town is surrounded by Rocky View County.

== History ==
Cochrane was established in 1881 as the Cochrane Ranche, after Matthew Henry Cochrane, a local rancher. It became a village in 1903 and it had a newspaper and volunteer fire department by 1909. Cochrane incorporated as a town in 1971.

== Geography ==
Cochrane is situated at the base of Big Hill in the Bow River Valley. It sits at an elevation of 1,186 m (3,891 ft). The town is intersected by Highway 1A and Highway 22. Cochrane has a reputation for its western culture—clearly seen when one wanders the streets (particularly First St). The town is a popular destination for ice cream and coffee in its quaint western-themed stores as well as for windsports, golfing, hiking and other adventure activities.

Cochrane is also a small industrial centre. Major industries include lumber, construction, retail, and agriculture (ranching). It is notable as being one of very few communities in Canada with no business tax.

The hill is also a popular training ground for cyclists from the area, who take advantage of its 7% grade and 3.5 km (2.2 mi) distance.

Vegetation in the Cochrane area is mostly a complex of grassland and aspen groves. Mixed forest, with white spruce most conspicuous, covers north-facing slopes and part of the Bow River valley.

=== Neighbourhoods ===
The following neighbourhoods are within Cochrane.

- Bow Meadows
- Bow Ridge
- Cochrane Heights
- Downtown
- East End
- Fireside
- Glenbow
- GlenEagles
- Greystone
- Heartland
- Heritage Hills
- Jumping Pound Ridge
- Precedence
- Rivercrest
- Riversong
- Riviera
- Riverview
- Rolling Range Estates
- Rolling Trails
- Southbow Landing
- South Ridge
- Sunset Ridge
- Sunterra Ridge Estates
- The Willows
- West Pointe
- West Terrace
- West Valley

== Demographics ==
In the 2021 Census of Population conducted by Statistics Canada, the Town of Cochrane had a population of 32,199 living in 12,096 of its 12,578 total private dwellings, a change of 24.5% from its 2016 population of 25,853. With a land area of 31.58 km^{2} (12.19 sq mi), it had a population density of 1,019.6/km^{2} (2,640.8/sq mi) in 2021.

The population of the Town of Cochrane according to its 2019 municipal census is 29,277, a change of 4.7% from its 2018 municipal census population of 27,960.

In the 2016 Census of Population conducted by Statistics Canada, the Town of Cochrane recorded a population of 25,853 living in 9,757 of its 10,225 total private dwellings, a 47.1% change from its 2011 population of 17,580. With a land area of 29.83 km^{2} (11.52 sq mi), it had a population density of 866.7/km^{2} (2,244.7/sq mi) in 2016.

Federal census population history

Year	Pop.	±%
1901	92	—
1906	158	+71.7%
1911	395	+150.0%
1916	284	−28.1%
1921	268	−5.6%
1926	282	+5.2%
1931	293	+3.9%
1936	339	+15.7%
1941	298	−12.1%

Year	Pop.	±%
1946	405	+35.9%
1951	530	+30.9%
1956	707	+33.4%
1961	857	+21.2%
1966	819	−4.4%
1971	1,046	+27.7%
1976	1,450	+38.6%
1981	3,544	+144.4%
1986	4,190	+18.2%

Year	Pop.	±%
1991	5,267	+25.7%
1996	7,424	+41.0%
2001	11,798	+58.9%
2006	13,760	+16.6%
2011	17,580	+27.8%
2016	25,853	+47.1%
2021	32,199	+24.5%

Source: Statistics Canada

=== Ethnicity ===
Panethnic groups in the Town of Cochrane (2001−2021)
Panethnic group	2021		2016		2011		2006		2001	
Panethnic group	Pop.	%	Pop.	%	Pop.	%	Pop.	%	Pop.	%
European (Note: Statistic includes all persons that did not make up part of a visible minority or an indigenous identity.)	27,320	86.81%	23,015	89.76%	16,160	93.46%	13,050	96.03%	11,170	96.21%
Indigenous	1,470	4.67%	1,075	4.19%	510	2.95%	285	2.1%	260	2.24%
Southeast Asian (Note: Statistic includes total responses of "Filipino" and "Southeast Asian" under visible minority section on census.)	980	3.11%	540	2.11%	160	0.93%	60	0.44%	0	0%
South Asian	510	1.62%	220	0.86%	125	0.72%	20	0.15%	65	0.56%
East Asian (Note: Statistic includes total responses of "Chinese", "Korean", and "Japanese" under visible minority section on census.)	350	1.11%	305	1.19%	145	0.84%	65	0.48%	65	0.56%
African	350	1.11%	180	0.7%	105	0.61%	45	0.33%	40	0.34%
Latin American	280	0.89%	140	0.55%	55	0.32%	0	0%	0	0%
Middle Eastern (Note: Statistic includes total responses of "West Asian" and "Arab" under visible minority section on census.)	100	0.32%	90	0.35%	0	0%	20	0.15%	10	0.09%
Other/multiracial (Note: Statistic includes total responses of "Visible minority, n.i.e." and "Multiple visible minorities" under visible minority section on census.)	115	0.37%	80	0.31%	0	0%	45	0.33%	0	0%
Total responses	31,470	97.74%	25,640	99.18%	17,290	98.35%	13,590	98.76%	11,610	96.42%
Total population	32,199	100%	25,853	100%	17,580	100%	13,760	100%	12,041	100%
Note: Totals greater than 100% due to multiple origin responses

== Arts and culture ==
Cochrane Ranche provided the corral setting for the 1954 National Film Board of Canada documentary Corral, by Colin Low, whose father had worked as a foreman at the ranch. This film played theatrically across Canada and was named Best Documentary at the Venice Film Festival.

Cochrane was used for many of the filming locations for the 1986 Film "Rad" (AKA "Helltrack") starring Bill Allen and Lori Loughlin. In the film, the town of Cochrane was used to represent the fictional town of Cochrane, Oregon, USA. Scenes for the film were shot in many different locations around town and at Spray Lake Sawmills (now known as "West Fraser Cochrane"). A former mayor of Cochrane, Jeff Genung 2017-2025, was included as an extra on the film.

Cochrane houses attractions such as Cochrane Ranche Historic Site and Bert Sheppard Stockmen's Foundation Library And Archives, located in the Cochrane Ranchehouse.

Cochrane is home to many annual events each year:

- Pumpkin lantern festival: October
- Chamber of Commerce Trade Fair: Early May
- Canada Day (July 1)
- Cochrane and Area Events Society, with support from the Town of Cochrane presents the Canada Day Community Celebration: Canada Day (July 1)
- Labour Day Rodeo & Parade: Labour Day weekend. In 2019 the parade had over 80 floats participate.
- Terry Fox Run: September
- Christmas Light-up: Late November

== Sports ==
The Cochrane Generals are a Junior B Hockey Club based out of Cochrane Alberta Canada. The Club has been representing the Town Of Cochrane Since 1984. The team played in the FJHL and the CAJHL before our move to the HJHL (Heritage Junior Hockey League) winning 2 championships both back to back 1985-1986 and 2007-2008. The Local Hockey Club played at the Original Cochrane Arena from 1984-2001/2018-2023 before our move to the SLS Centre. In the 41 year history of the Generals.They have won 6 Division titles and 4 league titles, Including 2 Silver medals at the Alberta Junior B Provincials.

== Government ==
=== Municipal politics ===
Cochrane has a town council consisting of an elected mayor and six councillors elected at-large. Councillors are elected by the eligible electors by voting for up to six candidates and the six receiving the largest number of votes being elected. The position of deputy mayor is rotated through the councillors over their term. Elections are held on the third Monday in October every fourth year.

As of April 7, 2026, the town council consists of mayor Morgan Nagel and councillors Marni Fedeyko, Laura McDonald, Tara McFadden, Mikayla Gale, Paul Singh, and Patrick Wilson.

=== Provincial politics ===
Cochrane is located within the provincial electoral division of Airdrie-Cochrane. It has been represented in the Alberta Legislature by UCP MLA Peter Guthrie since the 2019 provincial election.

Airdrie-Cochrane Provincial Election Results
Year	New Democrats		United Conservatives		Other Parties	
2023	11,223	37.3%	18,074	60.1%	775	2.6%
2019	7,183	25.2%	18,777	66.0%	2,494	8.8%
Note: Results include votes from all of Airdrie-Cochrane, which extends north beyond the Town of Cochrane's town limits

=== Federal politics ===
Cochrane was located in the federal electoral district of Banff—Airdrie until 2025. Since the 2025 General Election, it has been part of the Airdrie—Cochrane riding. Cochrane is represented by Blake Richards in the House of Commons. He also represented Cochrane from 2008-2015 as the MP for the federal electoral district of Wild Rose. He replaced long standing MP Myron Thompson, who was originally elected as a member of the Reform Party in 1993.

Airdrie—Cochrane Federal Election Results
Year	Conservatives		Liberals		New Democrats		Other Parties	
2025	50,252	71.2%	16,714	23.7%	2,591	3.7%	1,003	1.4%
2021	43,677	56.7%	9,572	12.4%	12,482	16.2%	11,257	14.5%
2019	55,504	71.1%	8,425	10.8%	8,185	10.5%	5,966	7.6%
Note: Results include votes from all of Airdrie/Banff-Cochrane, which extends beyond the Town of Cochrane's town limits

== Transit ==
On October 7, 2019 the town launched COLT (Cochrane On-Demand Local Transit). An app based local transportation service, described as an "Uber bus system". The transit system, which was chosen due to its significantly lower operating cost compared to traditional route based transit, allows for users to request a ride on demand from one of over 150 stops in the town. COLT has a partnership with On-It regional transit, providing a connection between Cochrane and Calgary.

== Education ==
Cochrane is home to schools from the public Rocky View School Division No. 41, the separate Calgary Catholic School District, and the Conseil Scolaire FrancoSud.

As of 2025, there were twelve public and separate schools in operation within the town boundaries.

- Rocky View School Division No. 41
  - Cochrane High School: Grades 9–12
  - Bow Valley High School: Grades 9–12
  - Rancheview School: Kindergarten, Grades 1-8
  - Elizabeth Barret Elementary School: Kindergarten, Grades 1–4
  - Glenbow Elementary School: Kindergarten, Grades 1–4
  - Mitford School: Grades 5-8
  - Manachaban Middle School: Grades 5-8
  - Cochrane Christian Academy: Kindergarten, Grades 1-8
  - Fireside School: Kindergarten, Grades 1-8
- Calgary Catholic School District
  - Holy Spirit: Kindergarten, Grades 1–6
  - St. Timothy: Grades 7–12
- Conseil Scolaire FrancoSud (FrancoSud School Board)
  - Notre Dame Des Vallées: Kindergarten, Grades 1-12 (Catholic)

In November 2006 the Rocky View School Division accepted a proposal by the Cochrane Christ-Centred Education Society to set up a Protestant Christian education program in Cochrane. The Cochrane Christian Academy opened its doors at Mitford Middle School in September 2007, offering kindergarten to grade 4. Approval for expansion to include grade 5 for the 2008–09 school year was given by the board of trustees in April 2008.

There are two trustees (one from each board) elected to represent Cochrane Schools at their respective boards.

The FrancoSud School Board (previously the Greater Southern Alberta Catholic Francophone Region #4) has one trustee for the Region from Cochrane.

Cochrane is also home to the Canadian Southern Baptist Seminary, the flagship seminary of the Canadian National Baptist Convention, the Canadian branch of the largest US Protestant denomination.

== Notable people ==
- Tyrel Bauer, professional ice hockey player
- Paul Brandt, musician
- Rohan Campbell, actor
- Rob Cote, professional football player
- Justin Dowling, professional ice hockey player
- Dillon Dubé, professional ice hockey player
- George Fox, musician
- Ethan Gage, professional soccer player
- John Hufnagel, president and GM of Calgary Stampeders
- Mason Raymond, professional ice hockey player
- Sarah Wozniewicz, professional ice hockey player

== See also ==
- List of communities in Alberta
- List of francophone communities in Alberta
