= Calgary/Springbank Airport =

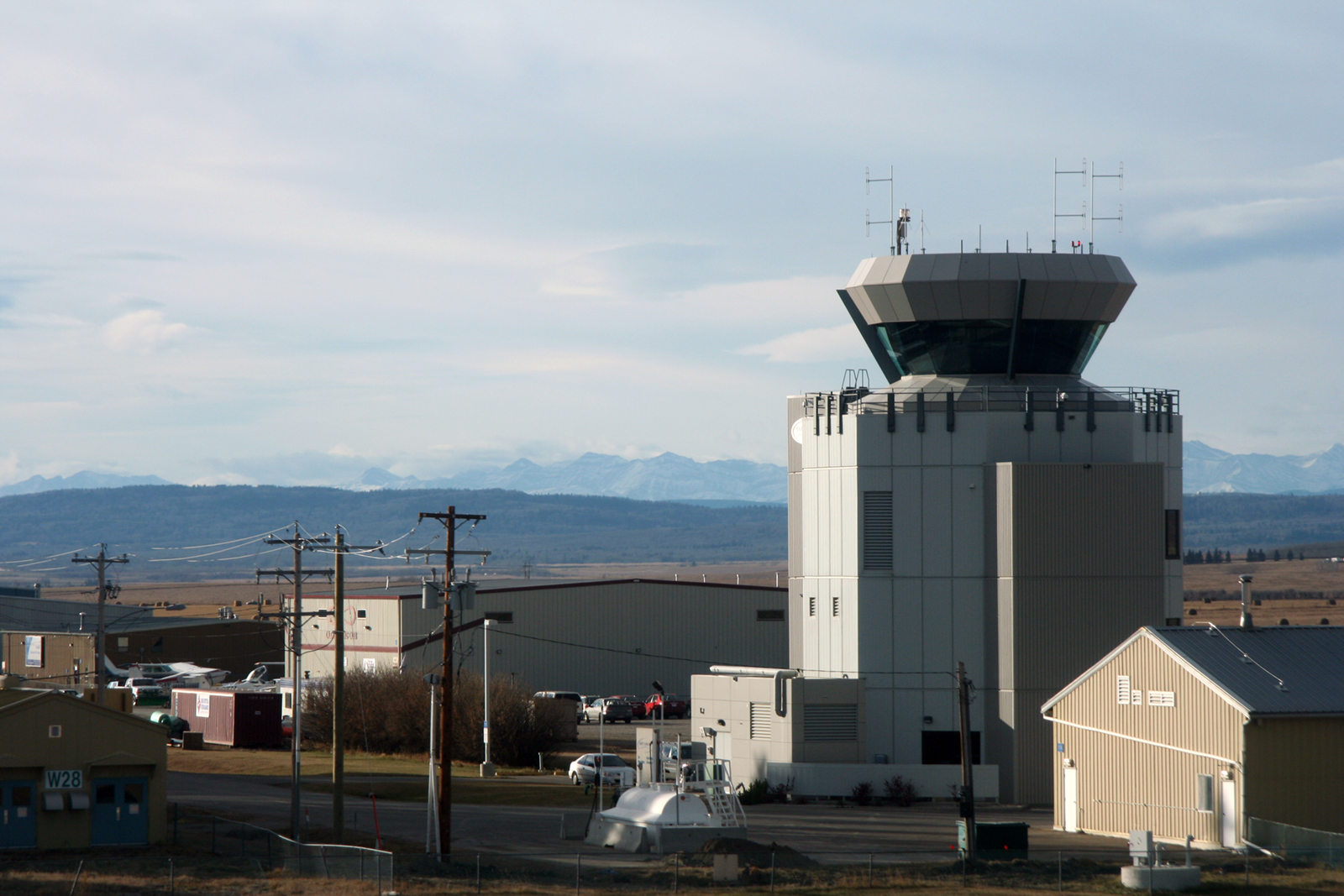
- IATA: none; ICAO: CYBW; WMO: 71860

Summary
- Airport type: Public
- Operator: Calgary Airport Authority
- Serves: Calgary, Alberta
- Location: Springbank, Rocky View County, Alberta
- Time zone: Alberta Time (UTC−06:00)
- Elevation AMSL: 3,940 ft / 1,201 m
- Coordinates: 51°06′11″N 114°22′28″W
- Website: YBW Calgary Airport Authority

Map
- Location in Alberta

Runways
Direction	Length		Surface
Direction	ft	m	Surface
08/26	3,423	1,043	Asphalt
17/35	5,000	1,524	Asphalt

Statistics (2021)
- Aircraft Movements: 138,969
- Sources: Canada Flight Supplement; Environment Canada; Movements from Statistics Canada

Calgary/Springbank Airport or Springbank Airport (ICAO: CYBW) is an airport located in the Rocky View County community of Springbank, Alberta, an area 8 nautical miles (15 km; 9.2 mi) to the west of Calgary in Alberta, Canada.

Springbank Airport acts as a general aviation reliever for Calgary's main airport, Calgary International Airport. Due to its nature and location, Springbank is the base of operations for many flight training schools, providing flight training services for the greater Calgary area. It is home to the Calgary Flying Club, the Mount Royal University Aviation Diploma program, and the Springbank Air Training College. These operators provide various degrees of flight training, from private pilot to commercial licences, and various licence ratings such as instrument flight rules (IFR), multi-engine, and night. It also provides flight training for helicopter licensing, and offers many specialty programs, such as mountain flying instruction/concurrency programs.

The airport is classified as an airport of entry by Nav Canada and is staffed by the Canada Border Services Agency (CBSA). CBSA officers at this airport can handle general aviation aircraft only, with no more than 15 passengers. In 2006, runway 16/34, now 17/35, was lengthened from 3,000 to 5,000 ft (914 to 1,524 m) to better support larger airplanes. This airport is also a base for aerial firefighting aircraft. A tanker base was constructed by Alberta Sustainable Resource Development (ASRD) and Conair operates a fleet of aircraft out of this base during the wildfire season.

The airport has been the host of the biennial Wings Over Springbank air show.

== Fixed-base operators ==
- Springbank Aero Services Inc.

== Maintenance ==
=== Rotary wing ===
- Genesis Helicopter Services Inc.
- Chinook Aviation
- Great Slave Helicopters

=== Fixed wing ===
- Artisan Aviation
- AvWorks Aerospace Inc.
- Canadian Avionics & Instruments Ltd
- Cavalier Aviation
- Foster Aircraft Maintenance Ltd.
- Innovative Wings
- Mustang Maintenance & Repairs Ltd
- Northern Avionics
- Rocky Mountain Aircraft

== Flight schools ==
=== Rotary wing ===
- Can-Oz Helicopters
- LR Heli
- Mountain View Helicopters
- Red Eagle Aviation

=== Fixed wing ===
- Calgary Flying Club
- Mount Royal University
- Springbank Air Training College

== Services ==
=== Fuel ===
==== Mobile ====
- Avgas & JetA-1 Springbank Aero Services (Executive Flight Centre)

==== Stationary ====
- AvGas Calgary Flying Club. 24 hour card lock self serve located on Taxiway "A".
- Avgas & Jet A Central Aviation Inc. 24 hour card lock self serve located at end of Taxiway "E".

=== Towing ===
- Springbank Aero Services (Executive Flight Centre)

=== Hangarage/tie down ===
- Calgary Flying Club - tie down
- Cavalier Aviation - tie down
- Springbank Aero Services (Executive Flight Centre) - hangarage and tie down

=== Rental cars ===
- Springbank Aero Services (Executive Flight Centre - Enterprise)

=== Pilot supplies ===
- Calgary Flying Club
- Springbank Air Training College

=== Charters ===
- Central Aviation

== See also ==
- List of airports in the Calgary area
