= Alberta Highway 564 =

Highway in Alberta, Canada

Highway 564

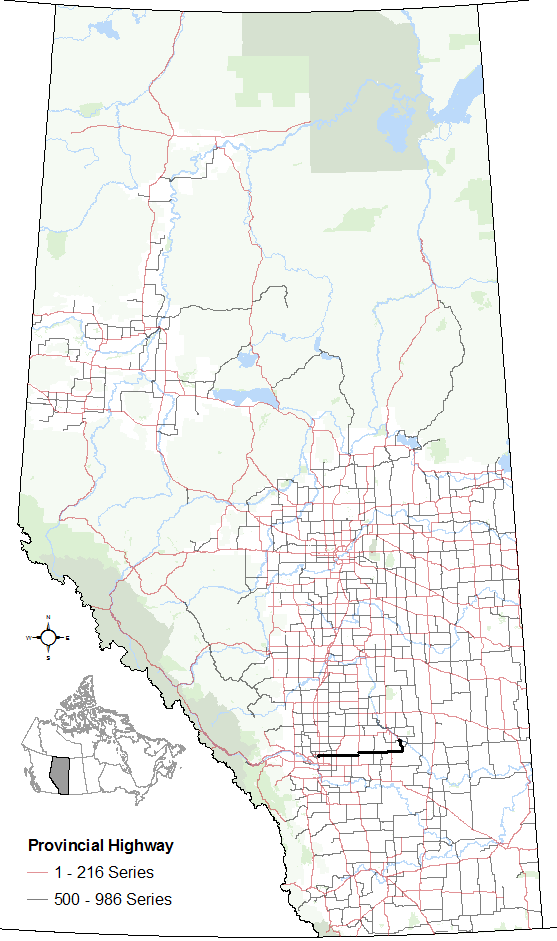

Route information
- Maintained by Alberta Transportation
- Length: 126 km (78 mi)

Major junctions
- West end: Calgary city limits
- Highway 9 Highway 21; Highway 56
- East end: Highway 569 south of Drumheller

Location
- Country: Canada
- Province: Alberta
- Specialized and rural municipalities: Rocky View County, Wheatland County
- Major cities: Calgary

Highway system
- Alberta Provincial Highway Network; List; Former
← Highway 563	→ Highway 566

Alberta Provincial Highway No. 564 commonly referred to as Highway 564, is a highway in the province of Alberta, Canada. It runs mostly west–east from the east Calgary boundary (formerly at 84 Street NE, Range Road 290), through no town or village, through Wintering Hills, then north to Highway 569 south of the Red Deer River and Drumheller. It is known as Country Hills Boulevard in Calgary.

== Major intersections ==
Starting from the west end of Highway 564:

Rural/specialized municipality	Location	km	mi	Destinations	Notes
City of Calgary		−0.6	−0.37	Country Hills Boulevard continues west	
City of Calgary		−0.6	−0.37	Stoney Trail (Highway 201)	Interchange; exit 68 on Hwy 201
City of Calgary		0.0	0.0	Calgary city limits	Hwy 564 western terminus
Rocky View County	Delacour	10	6.2	Highway 791 – Chestermere	North and south intersections are offset; Hwy 761 concurrency for 95 m (310 ft)
Rocky View County		16	9.9	Highway 9 – Drumheller, Beiseker, Calgary	
Wheatland County		23	14	Range Road 264 – Lyalta	
Wheatland County		35	22	Highway 817 south – Strathmore	
Wheatland County		45	28	Highway 21 south – Hwy 1 (TCH), Strathmore	Hwy 564 branches north; west end of Hwy 21 concurrency
Wheatland County		49	30	Highway 21 north – Rockyford, Three Hills	Hwy 564 branches east; east end of Hwy 21 concurrency
Wheatland County		68	42	Highway 840 – Rosebud, Standard	
Wheatland County		79	49	Highway 842 south – Chancellor	
Wheatland County		92	57	Highway 56 – Drumheller, Hussar	
Wheatland County		107	66	Range Road 182 / Township Road 260	Hwy 564 turns north
Wheatland County		114	71	Highway 848 east – Dorothy	
Wheatland County		126	78	Highway 569 to Highway 10 – Drumheller	
1.000 mi = 1.609 km; 1.000 km = 0.621 mi: Closed/former; Concurrency terminus
