= List of curling clubs in Alberta =

Curling clubs in Alberta are organized by the provincial governing body, Curling Alberta. Curling Alberta was formed in 2018 as an amalgamate of the Alberta Curling Federation (ACF), the Northern Alberta Curling Association (NACA), the Southern Alberta Curling Association (SACA), and the Peace Curling Association (PCA).

== Northern Alberta Curling Association ==
=== Zone 1-6 ===
- Avonair Curling Club - Edmonton
- Crestwood Curling Club - Edmonton
- Derrick Curling Club - Edmonton
- Edmonton Garrison Memorial Golf & Curling Club - Lancaster Park
- Granite Curling Club - Edmonton
- Jasper Place Curling Club - Edmonton
- Ottewell Curling Club - Edmonton
- Saville Community Sports Centre - Edmonton
- Shamrock Curling Club - Edmonton
- Sherwood Park Curling Club - Sherwood Park
- St. Albert Curling Club - St. Albert
- Thistle Curling Club - Edmonton

=== Zone 7 ===
- Bonnyville Curling Club - Bonnyville
- Cold Lake Curling Club - Cold Lake
- Elk Point Curling Club - Elk Point
- Glendon Curling Club - Glendon
- Lac La Biche Curling Club - Lac La Biche
- Myrnam Curling Club - Myrnam
- St. Paul Curling Club - St. Paul
- Vilna Curling Club - Vilna

=== Zone 8 ===
- Innisfree Curling Club - Innisfree
- Kitscoty Curling Club - Kitscoty
- Lloydminster Curling Club - Lloydminster
- Vermilion Curling Club - Vermilion

=== Zone 9 ===
- Chauvin Curling Club - Chauvin
- Hardisty Curling Club - Hardisty
- Irma Curling Club - Irma
- Provost Curling Club - Provost
- Wainwright Curling Club - Wainwright
- Czar Curling Club - Czar

=== Zone 10 ===
- Bashaw Curling Club - Bashaw
- Castor Curling Club - Castor
- Consort Curling Club - Consort
- Forestburg Curling Club - Forestburg
- Stettler Curling Club - Stettler

=== Zone 11 ===
- Daysland Curling Club - Daysland
- Hay Lakes Curling Club - Hay Lakes
- Rose City Curling Club - Camrose
- Ryley Curling Club - Ryley
- Sedgewick Curling Club - Sedgewick
- Strathcona Curling Club - Sherwood Park
- Strome Curling Club - Strome
- Tofield Curling Club - Tofield
- Viking Curling Club - Viking

=== Zone 12 ===
- Ardrossan Curling Club - Ardrossan
- Fort Saskatchewan Curling Club - Fort Saskatchewan
- Gibbons Curling Club - Gibbons
- Heather Curling Club - Vegreville
- Lamont Curling Club - Lamont
- Mundare Curling Club - Mundare
- Redwater Curling Club - Redwater
- Smoky Lake Curling Club - Smoky Lake
- Two Hills Curling Club - Two Hills
- Waskatenau Curling Club - Waskatenau

=== Zone 13 ===
- Athabasca Curling Club - Athabasca
- Barrhead Curling Club - Barrhead
- Boyle Curling Club - Boyle
- Fort McMurray Oilsands Curling Club - Fort McMurray
- Legal Curling Club - Legal
- Morinville Curling Club - Morinville
- Plamondon Curling Club - Plamondon
- Swan Hills Curling Club - Swan Hills
- Westlock Curling Club - Westlock

=== Zone 14 ===
- Bentley Curling Club - Bentley
- Calumet Curling Club - Bashaw
- Eckville Curling Club - Eckville
- Lacombe Curling Club - Lacombe
- Ponoka Curling Club - Ponoka
- Rimbey Curling Club - Rimbey
- Rocky Curling Club - Rocky Mountain House
- Sylvan Lake Curling Club - Sylvan Lake

=== Zone 15 ===
- Alder Flats Community Agricultural Society - Alder Flats
- Beaumont Curling Club - Beaumont
- Calmar Curling Club - Calmar
- Ellerslie Curling Club - Edmonton
- Lakedell Curling Club - Westerose
- Leduc Curling Club - Leduc
- Millet Curling Club - Millet
- Warburg Curling Club - Warburg
- Wetaskiwin Curling Club - Wetaskiwin

=== Zone 16 ===
- Drayton Valley Curling Club - Drayton Valley
- Edson & District Curling Club - Edson
- Grande Cache Curling Club - Grande Cache
- Hinton Curling Club - Hinton
- Jasper Curling Club - Jasper
- Lakeside Curling Club - Seba Beach
- Mayerthorpe Curling Club - Mayerthorpe
- Onoway Curling Club - Onoway
- Peers Curling Club - Peers
- Robb Curling Centre - Robb
- Spruce Grove Curling Club - Spruce Grove
- Westridge Curling Club - Stony Plain
- Whitecourt Curling Club - Whitecourt
- Wildwood Curling Club - Wildwood

== Peace Curling Association ==
- Beaverlodge Curling Club - Beaverlodge
- Debolt & District Agriculture Society - Debolt
- Fairview Curling Club - Fairview
- Falher Curling Club - Falher
- Fort Vermilion & District Curling Club - Fort Vermilion
- Fox Creek Curling Club - Fox Creek
- Grande Prairie Curling Centre - Grande Prairie
- Grimshaw Curling Club - Grimshaw
- High Prairie Curling Club - High Prairie
- Hythe Curling Club - Hythe
- La Glace Curling Club - La Glace
- Manning Curling Club - Manning
- Peace River Curling Club - Peace River
- Rainbow Lake Curling Club - Rainbow Lake
- Red Willow Curling Club - Valleyview
- Sexsmith Curling Club - Sexsmith
- Slave Lake Curling Club - Slave Lake
- Spirit River Curling Club - Spirit River

== Southern Alberta Curling Association ==
- Acadia Recreation Complex - Calgary
- Acme Curling Club - Acme
- Airdrie Curling Club - Airdrie
- Banff Curling Club - Banff
- Bassano Curling Club - Bassano
- Bow Island Curling Club - Bow Island
- Bow Valley Community Club - Indus
- Brooks Curling Club - Brooks
- Calgary Curling Club - Calgary
- Calgary Winter Club - Calgary
- Canmore Curling Club - Canmore
- Carbon & District Agricultural Society - Carbon
- Caroline Curling Club - Caroline
- Carseland Curling Club - Carseland
- Carstairs Curling Club - Carstairs
- Chestermere Curling Club - Chestermere
- Claresholm Curling Club - Claresholm
- Coaldale Granite Club - Coaldale
- Cochrane Curling Club - Cochrane
- Coronation Curling Club - Coronation
- Cremona Curling Club - Cremona
- Crossfield Curling Club - Crossfield
- Crowsnest Curling Club - Crowsnest Pass
- Delburne Curling Club - Delburne
- Delia Curling Club - Delia
- Didsbury Curling Club - Didsbury
- Drumheller Curling Club - Drumheller
- Duchess Curling Club - Duchess
- Fort Macleod Curling Club - Fort Macleod
- Garrison Curling Club - Calgary
- Hanna Curling Club - Hanna
- Highwood Curling Club - High River
- Huntington Hills Curling Club - Calgary
- Hussar Curling Club - Hussar
- Huxley Community Association - Huxley
- Inglewood Golf & Curling Club - Calgary
- Innisfail Curling Club - Innisfail
- Irricana Curling Club - Irricana
- Irvine & District Curling Club - Irvine
- Lethbridge Curling Club - Lethbridge
- Lomond Curling Club - Lomond
- Madden Curling Club - Madden
- Magrath Curling Club - Magrath
- Medicine Hat Curling Club - Medicine Hat
- Michener Hill Curling Club - Red Deer
- Milo Curling Club - Milo
- Nanton Curling Club - Nanton
- North Hill Curling Club - Calgary
- Oilfields Curling Club - Black Diamond
- Okotoks Curling Club - Okotoks
- Olds Curling Club - Olds
- Oyen Curling Club - Oyen
- Pincher Creek Curling Club - Pincher Creek
- Pidherney Curling Centre - Red Deer
- Rockyford Curling Club - Rockyford
- Rumsey & District Agricultural Society - Rumsey
- Springbank Curling Club - Springbank
- Standard Curling Club - Standard
- Strathmore & District Curling Club - Strathmore
- Sundre Curling Club - Sundre
- Taber Curling Club - Taber
- The Glencoe Club - Calgary
- Three Hills Curling Club - Three Hills
- Torrington Curling Club - Torrington
- Vauxhall & District Curling Association - Vauxhall
- Vulcan Curling Club - Vulcan
- Warner Curling Club - Warner
- Youngstown Curling Club - Youngstown
