= Crowfoot Ferry =

Coordinates: 50°47′55″N 112°38′51″W

- Locale: Crowfoot, Alberta
- Waterway: Bow River
- Transit type: Automobile
- Operator: Alberta Transportation
- System length: 150 m (490 ft)
- Website: Ferries - Alberta Transportation

The Crowfoot Ferry is a cable ferry in near Crowfoot, Alberta, Canada. It links the two sections of Range Road 201 as it crosses the Bow River from Wheatland County on the north, to Vulcan County on the south, within the Siksika Nation. Originally opened in 1927, It is located 5 kilometres (3 mi) south of the Highway 1 (Trans-Canada Highway) / Highway 56 intersection and is maintained by Alberta Transportation. The ferry suffered considerable damage during the 2013 Alberta floods and was out of operation for four years while it was rebuilt.

The ferry operates from late April to November.
