= Eagle Lake (Alberta) =

Lake in Wheatland County, Alberta, Canada

- Interactive map of Eagle Lake
- Location: Wheatland County, near Strathmore, Alberta
- Coordinates: 50°59′48″N 113°19′27″W
- Basin countries: Canada
- Max. length: 4.4 km (2.7 mi)
- Max. width: 4 km (2.5 mi)
- Surface area: 11.8 km^{2} (4.6 sq mi)
- Average depth: 2.6 m (8.5 ft)
- Max. depth: 4.9 m (16 ft)
- Surface elevation: 923 m (3,028 ft)
- Settlements: Strathmore
- References: Eagle Lake

Eagle Lake is a lake in Wheatland County, Alberta, Canada, located southeast of Strathmore. It is part of the Eagle, Namaka and Stobart lakes area, which is recognized by Birds Canada as an Important Bird and Biodiversity Area.

== Birds ==
Eagle Lake is the largest of the four lakes in the Eagle, Namaka and Stobart Lakes Important Bird and Biodiversity Area, an 85.86-square-kilometre (33.15 sq mi) site that Birds Canada rates as globally significant for congregatory species and waterfowl concentrations. The site is also used by Ducks Unlimited for wetland conservation projects.

The lakes are an important staging area for migrating waterbirds. Counts recorded across the site include 300,000 mallards in the winter of 1970, up to 15,061 greater white-fronted geese in the fall between 2012 and 2015, between 1,500 and 4,000 tundra swans in the fall between 1994 and 2010, 1,500 western grebes in the spring of 1985 and 2,000 Wilson's phalaropes in August 1996. Up to 40 bald eagles winter in the area, feeding on over-wintering waterfowl, and more than 50 non-breeding American white pelicans spend the summer there.

Species nesting at the site include Franklin's gulls, common and black terns, eared and western grebes, and Canada geese. Sprague's pipit, a nationally threatened species, nests in remnant native grassland on Eagle Lake's backshore, and the piping plover has been recorded at the lake.

== Fishing ==
Northern pike and walleye are the lake's main sport fish. The Government of Alberta has included Eagle Lake in its fall index netting program, used primarily to monitor walleye and northern pike populations.

== See also ==
- List of lakes of Alberta
