= Redland, Alberta =

Redland
- Hamlet
- Location of Redland Redland (Canada)
- Coordinates: 51.290°N 113.008°W
- Country: Canada
- Province: Alberta
- Region: Southern Alberta
- Census division: 5
- Municipal district: Wheatland County, Alberta

Government
  - Type: Unincorporated
  - Governing body: Wheatland County, Alberta Council

Area (2021)
  - Land: 0.14 km^{2} (0.054 sq mi)

Population (2021)
  - Total: 20
  - Density: 139.8/km^{2} (362/sq mi)
- Time zone: UTC−06:00 (Alberta Time)
- Area codes: 403, 587, 825

Redland is a hamlet in Alberta, Canada that is under the jurisdiction of Wheatland County that is recognized as a designated place by Statistics Canada. It is on Range Road 222A, 4 km (2.5 mi) west of Highway 840.

== Demographics ==
Population history of Redland
Year	Pop.	±%
1981	18	—
1986	20	+11.1%
1991	17	−15.0%
1996	16	−5.9%
2001	20	+25.0%
2006	15	−25.0%
2011	15	+0.0%
2016	15	+0.0%
2021	20	+33.3%
Source: Statistics Canada

In the 2021 Census of Population conducted by Statistics Canada, Redland had a population of 20 living in 11 of its 12 total private dwellings, a change of 33.3% from its 2016 population of 15. With a land area of 0.14 km^{2} (0.054 sq mi), it had a population density of 142.9/km^{2} (370.0/sq mi) in 2021.

As a designated place in the 2016 Census of Population conducted by Statistics Canada, Redland had a population of 15 living in 8 of its 9 total private dwellings, a change of 0% from its 2011 population of 15. With a land area of 0.14 km^{2} (0.054 sq mi), it had a population density of 107.1/km^{2} (277.5/sq mi) in 2016.

== See also ==
- List of communities in Alberta
- List of designated places in Alberta
- List of hamlets in Alberta
