= Ardenode, Alberta =

Ardenode
- Hamlet
- Location of Ardenode Ardenode (Canada)
- Coordinates: 51°08′40″N 113°25′25″W
- Country: Canada
- Province: Alberta
- Region: Southern Alberta
- Census division: 5
- Municipal district: Wheatland County, Alberta

Government
  - Type: Unincorporated
  - Governing body: Wheatland County, Alberta Council

Area
  - Land: 0.07 km^{2} (0.027 sq mi)

Population (2016)
  - Total: 0
- Time zone: UTC−06:00 (Alberta Time)
- Area codes: 403, 587, 825

Ardenode is a hamlet and ghost town in southern Alberta, Canada that is under the jurisdiction of Wheatland County. It is 20 kilometres (12 mi) east of Highway 9, 48 kilometres (30 mi) northeast of Calgary. It was founded as a railroad siding in 1913. The community takes its name from Ardenode in Ireland.

== Toponymy ==
The community derives its name from Ardinode in County Kildare, Ireland.

== Topography ==
Ardenode is located upon Chernozemic soil, to which moisture is supplied primarily by precipitation. The land is well-drained due to its location on sloping terrain.

== History ==
The Canadian Northern Railway (CNR) began constructing a railroad through the area that would become Ardenode in 1910. A school was established in the area around this time, named Serviceberry School. In anticipation of the railway, settler George Davis, originally from County Kildare in Ireland, moved from Nightingale to begin constructing a general store in 1911. A CNR siding was completed that year, and given the name Hawick after a town in Scotland.

In 1915, Davis and his twin sons, Roger and Tony, applied to open a post office in their store. Another settlement in Alberta had already claimed the name Hawick, so the Davises submitted 14 names derived from places in Ireland to the Post Office Department. Ardenode was chosen, and the community and its school subsequently became known as Ardenode as well.

Ardenode's local economy primarily centred around pastoral farming in the 1920s and 1930s. Farms shipped dairy and poultry products to Calgary via the CNR line, which ran through Ardenode twice a day. A grain elevator built in 1926 was purchased by the Alberta Wheat Pool in 1928 and began operations that year. Nonetheless, as vehicle ownership became more common in Alberta, Ardenode's population began to decline. Its school closed in 1944 and students transferred to nearby Nightingale.

After staying in Ardenode for three weeks in November 1954, opera singer Lauritz Melchior became a critic of Canada's then-restrictive drinking laws, which he called "ridiculous." He claimed to have "never seen so many youngsters drunk" before his stay in the locality.

Ardenode's post office closed in November 1959. At this time, there were fewer than thirty families in the hamlet. Train services to Ardenode ended by 1972, as the station was demolished in March of that year. Almost two years later, in January 1974, the Alberta Wheat Pool grain elevator was dismantled. By 1992, only the general store remained of the original Ardenode settlement.

In August 2022, Epcor announced its intention to open a processing plant near Ardenode that would convert manure into renewable energy. The project was cancelled by December, citing cost. In May 2023, Wheatland County denied a development permit for an abattoir near Ardenode, after receiving 32 letters of concern regarding traffic and odours in the area.

As of 2023, the area is occupied by some residences and agricultural operations.

== Services ==
=== Governance ===
Following redistricting in 2024, Ardenode falls within Wheatland County's Electoral Division 5.

=== Connectivity ===
The Government of Alberta announced in January 2026 that the Ardenode area will receive high-speed internet access by the end of the year, owing to funding from the provincial and federal governments.

== Demographics ==
Population history of Ardenode
Year	Pop.	±%
1991A	2	—
1996	2	+0.0%
2001	0	−100.0%
2006	0	0.00%
2011	0	0.00%
2016	0	0.00%
Source: Statistics Canada

The Ardenode area contains a mix of residential properties and agricultural operations as of 2023.

As a designated place in the 2016 Census of Population conducted by Statistics Canada, Ardenode recorded a population of 0 living in 1 of its 1 total private dwellings, no change from its 2011 population of 0. With a land area of 0.07 km^{2} (0.027 sq mi), it had a population density of 0.0/km^{2} (0.0/sq mi) in 2016.

As a designated place in the 2011 Census, Ardenode had a population of 0 living in 1 of its 1 total dwellings, no change from its 2006 population of 0. It had a land area of 0.07 km^{2} (0.027 sq mi) in 2011.

== See also ==
- List of communities in Alberta
- List of ghost towns in Alberta
- List of hamlets in Alberta
