= Dalum, Alberta =

Coordinates: 51°17′59″N 112°37′51″W

Location of Dalum in Alberta

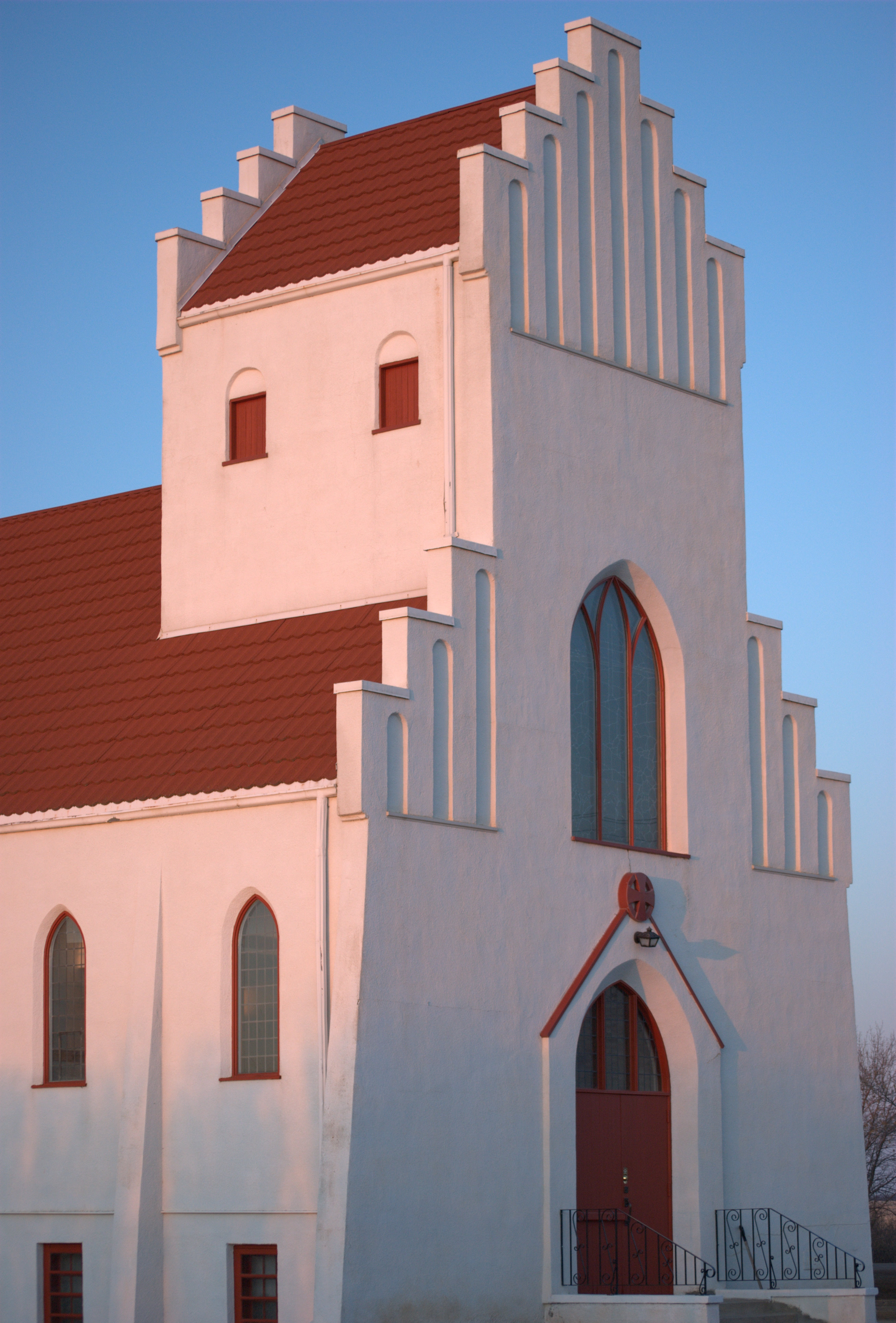
Bethlehem Lutheran Church, Dalum, Alberta. Inspired by a typical Danish church

Dalum is a hamlet in Alberta, Canada that is under the jurisdiction of Wheatland County. It is 15 km (9.3 mi) south of Drumheller at the intersection of Highway 569 and Highway 56, at an elevation of 875 meters (2,871 ft). It was established by a Danish group called the Dansk Folkesamfund.

The hamlet is located in census division No. 5 and in the federal riding of Crowfoot.

The community is home to the Bethlehem Lutheran Church of Dalum. The Drumheller/Ostergard's Airport is immediately southeast of the community.

== History ==
"Dansk Folkesamfund" was started in 1887 by Pastor F.L. Grundtvig, who at the time was the pastor of the Danish Lutheran Church in Clinton, Iowa. He was the son of the late Bishop N.F.S. Grundtvig, well-known Danish hymn-writer and church leader in Denmark.

"Dansk Folkesamfund" had been organized, under the leadership of F.L. Grundtvig, by men and women from various Danish communities' with the aim of strengthening the cultural heritage of Danish-American immigrants here on the North American Continent.

Local branches of "D.F." were started in the various Danish settlements, and these would have regular meetings with a program of lectures, song and fellowship; many established Danish libraries or Reading Clubs (Læsekredse), where good Danish books would circulate amongst the members of same.

D.F. also took the initiative to have a Danish-American Song book published, known as "Sangbog for Det Danske Folk i Amerika". Later a music edition was published and used extensively in all our Danish communities. This Danish songbook continued to find great favor in Danish communities, and was re-edited several times, finally coming out in the sixth edition in 1949. In 1894 D.F. sponsored the beginning of a Danish-American colony in Texas, and gave it the name of "Danevang." In 1905, a similar colony was started in Askov, Minnesota. Both colonies have developed into large Danish settlements.

In 1916, representatives for D.F. made contact with the Canadian Pacific Railway Company, and soon negotiations were under way for a tract of land for a colony in Alberta. Two members of the D.F. land committee, Mr. L.D. Pedersen of Askov, Minnesota, and Mr. J. Gregersen, of Chicago, came to this area and brought back a favorable report to a meeting of Directors of D.F. which was held in Chicago, January 15, 1917. A representative of the C.P.R. was present at this meeting

Mr. J. Gregersen and Mr. Jens Hvass, both of Chicago, were again sent on a trip to Alberta. This was in the month of April, 1917. The larger part of the two townships 27-19 and 20 were chosen and reserved for a settlement of Danish people. Later, more land was added. Jens Hvass, who was a bachelor and lived in Chicago, agreed to move here and be the land agent and representative for the new colony. Upon his suggestion, the new colony was named Dalum. This was the name of a well-known Agricultural School in Denmark.

Most of the land was priced at $14–$18 per acre, and it was agreed that it could also be sold on a twenty-year contract with a 10% down payment. D.F. was to have 5% commission. Out of this amount, Mr. Hvass was paid 2% for acting as agent.

However, as time went on, very few, if any, of the new settlers paid the original contract price. Time proved that the conditions were such that the payments could not be made, and the C.P R. was generous enough to change the contracts to a period of thirty-four years, and thereby, smaller payments. Later, after further difficulties, drought, hail, etc., the C.P.R. re-valued the land, and most of the land was bought for as low as $4 per acre. Then as conditions changed to the better, most of the land was paid for in a comparative short time.

Several of the original settlers had given up because of the bad times, and sold their land to neighbors or others, and then moved away. Some land had been sold to individuals in the United States for investment, then rented to some of the resident farmers. These, however, did not get the reduction in price that the settlers were given.

As mentioned before, not only drought and hail but also extremely low prices gave the early settlers great difficulties. In the fall of 1932, most of the wheat was sold for about 25 cents per bushel, some as low as 18 cents. And there was a period during the so-called depression when we only received $5.00 for a 200 lb (91 kg). hog, even if we delivered it to Calgary. Cattle sold as low as 1 1/4 cents per lb. The years of 1936–37 were extremely dry. In 1937 very few farmers harvested as many bushels as they seeded. This was the year in which the Dominion Government shipped a carload of produce to Wayne for general free distribution.

Fortunately, this was the end of the drought. In 1938 good crop was harvested, and this has continued, with some ups and downs, to the present day.

(The above information was contributed from "REFLECTIONS," published by The Dalum History Book Committee, copyright 1990. ISBN 0-9694900-0-3. Used by permission.)

== See also ==
- List of communities in Alberta
- List of hamlets in Alberta
