= Craigmyle, Alberta =

Craigmyle
- Hamlet
- Location of Craigmyle Craigmyle (Canada)
- Coordinates: 51°40′11″N 112°14′35″W
- Country: Canada
- Province: Alberta
- Region: Southern Alberta
- Census division: 5
- Municipal district: Starland County

Government
  - Type: Unincorporated
  - Governing body: Starland County Council

Population (2013)
  - Total: 79
- Time zone: UTC−06:00 (Alberta Time)
- Area codes: 403, 587, 825

Craigmyle is a hamlet in Alberta, Canada within Starland County. It is located between the towns of Delia and Hanna. It was named in 1912 by a Canadian Northern Railway ahead of the train's arrival in April 1914. The name is said to be based on a Scottish estate. Previously incorporated as a village, Craigmyle dissolved to become a hamlet on 1 January 1972.

== Climate ==
Climate data for Craigmyle, Alberta
Month	Jan	Feb	Mar	Apr	May	Jun	Jul	Aug	Sep	Oct	Nov	Dec	Year
Record high °C (°F)	14.0 (57.2)	15.5 (59.9)	26.0 (78.8)	30.0 (86.0)	34.5 (94.1)	37.5 (99.5)	38.5 (101.3)	37.0 (98.6)	35.6 (96.1)	28.9 (84.0)	21.7 (71.1)	15.6 (60.1)	38.5 (101.3)
Mean daily maximum °C (°F)	−6.0 (21.2)	−3.2 (26.2)	2.7 (36.9)	11.8 (53.2)	17.7 (63.9)	21.4 (70.5)	24.7 (76.5)	23.6 (74.5)	18.3 (64.9)	11.4 (52.5)	0.6 (33.1)	−3.6 (25.5)	10.0 (50.0)
Daily mean °C (°F)	−11.3 (11.7)	−8.7 (16.3)	−2.9 (26.8)	4.9 (40.8)	10.5 (50.9)	14.6 (58.3)	17.3 (63.1)	16.2 (61.2)	11.1 (52.0)	4.6 (40.3)	−4.5 (23.9)	−8.6 (16.5)	3.6 (38.5)
Mean daily minimum °C (°F)	−16.6 (2.1)	−14.3 (6.3)	−8.5 (16.7)	−2.1 (28.2)	3.2 (37.8)	7.8 (46.0)	9.9 (49.8)	8.7 (47.7)	3.8 (38.8)	−2.1 (28.2)	−9.6 (14.7)	−14.1 (6.6)	−2.8 (27.0)
Record low °C (°F)	−43.3 (−45.9)	−42 (−44)	−38.9 (−38.0)	−26.7 (−16.1)	−11 (12)	−6.1 (21.0)	0.0 (32.0)	−3.5 (25.7)	−10 (14)	−26 (−15)	−34.5 (−30.1)	−45 (−49)	−45 (−49)
Average precipitation mm (inches)	14.4 (0.57)	12.6 (0.50)	23.0 (0.91)	25.5 (1.00)	46.7 (1.84)	81.2 (3.20)	63.4 (2.50)	57.8 (2.28)	41.0 (1.61)	15.2 (0.60)	16.5 (0.65)	13.8 (0.54)	411.2 (16.19)
Average rainfall mm (inches)	0.0 (0.0)	0.1 (0.00)	1.3 (0.05)	15.4 (0.61)	42.3 (1.67)	81.2 (3.20)	63.4 (2.50)	57.8 (2.28)	38.8 (1.53)	8.1 (0.32)	0.7 (0.03)	0.1 (0.00)	309.3 (12.18)
Average snowfall cm (inches)	14.4 (5.7)	12.5 (4.9)	21.7 (8.5)	10.1 (4.0)	4.5 (1.8)	0.0 (0.0)	0.0 (0.0)	0.0 (0.0)	2.3 (0.9)	7.1 (2.8)	15.8 (6.2)	13.7 (5.4)	101.9 (40.1)
Source: Environment Canada

== Demographics ==
Population history of Craigmyle
Year	Pop.	±%
1901		—
1906		—
1911		—
1916		—
1921	231	—
1926	232	+0.4%
1931	236	+1.7%
1936	214	−9.3%
1941	186	−13.1%
1946	140	−24.7%
1951	136	−2.9%
1956	138	+1.5%
1961	107	−22.5%
1966		—
1971		—
1976		—
1981		—
1986		—
1991		—
Source: Statistics Canada

The population of Craigmyle according to the 2013 municipal census conducted by Starland County is 79.

== See also ==
- List of communities in Alberta
- List of former urban municipalities in Alberta
- List of hamlets in Alberta
