= Del Barber =

Canadian musician

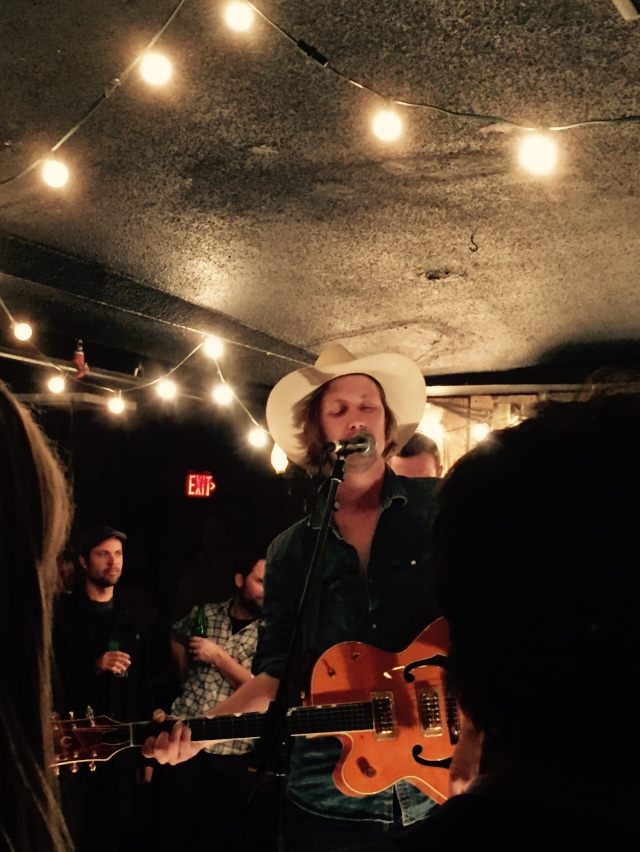
- Del Barber, October 2014

Background information
- Born: Delainey Doucha Barber; October 14, 1983 (age 43); Winnipeg, Manitoba, Canada
- Origin: Winnipeg, Manitoba, Canada
- Genres: Folk; folk rock; alternative country; Americana; roots; country; Canadiana
- Occupations: Musician; singer-songwriter; record producer
- Instruments: Guitar; harmonica; banjo; mandolin; vocals
- Years active: 2005–present
- Labels: Corn Cob Music; Six Shooter; True North; Acronym Records

Delainey Doucha Barber (born October 14, 1983) is a Canadian independent folk, folk rock, Americana, and alternative country singer-songwriter, musician, and record producer. Barber has been nominated for and won a number of awards including a being nominated for a 2011 Juno Award for Love Songs of the Last 20 in the category of Roots & Traditional Album of the Year - Solo. Later in 2011 he won two Western Canadian Music Awards for Independent Album of the Year and Roots Solo Recording of the Year. In 2012, Barber was nominated for a Canadian Folk Music Award in the category of Solo Artist of the Year. In 2013, he once again won the Roots Solo Recording of the Year for Headwaters at the Western Canadian Music Awards. In 2020, he was nominated for a Juno Award in the category of Contemporary Roots Album of the Year.

== Early life ==
Barber was born on October 14, 1983, in Winnipeg, Manitoba, Canada to Boyd Barber and Jean Doucha. Growing up in the St. Norbert neighbourhood of Winnipeg, he took up the guitar. By the time he was sixteen, he was writing music and performing in different bands. One summer, after working to save up money, he recorded the songs he had written. This was first glimpse of Del writing and producing his own music. After his first self recording became a hit among his friends, they encouraged and convinced him to play a live show. Despite his early success, Barber was doubtful about this being a viable career choice. But as he finished school and moved on to college, he would continue with music.

He cites some of his influences as Townes Van Zandt, Greg Brown, John Prine, Emmylou Harris, Steve Earle, Wilco, Bruce Springsteen, Neil Young, Gram Parsons, Bob Dylan, Lucinda Williams, Loretta Lynn, Mississippi John Hurt, Ramblin' Jack Elliot, Merle Haggard, The Band, Ryan Adams, and Rancid. Del is also influenced by authors such as Farley Mowat, Wendell Berry, Jack Kerouac, and Kathleen Norris.

== Career ==
=== Early career ===
Barber continued recording music while attending Covenant Bible College. From there he would start playing shows all across North America. During his one year at North Park University studying philosophy, he would continue to write music. He would then make his way back to Winnipeg to continue studying philosophy.

After the release of two early demo albums, Barber went back into the studio to record his eleven-track album Where the City Ends. With many positive reviews of this album, he continued to tour extensively in support of the album. Where the City Ends was nominated in the category of Roots Solo Album of the Year at the Western Canadian Music Awards. In 2010, Barber released his second album entitled Love Songs for the Last 20. Once again, Barber had critical success with the album and continued to tour extensively. In August 2010, Barber was nominated for a Western Canadian Music Award for Roots Solo Album of the Year for Where the City Ends. The album also received a second nomination for Best Album Design of the Year which album designer Brooke Nelson was nominated. In 2011, he was nominated for a Juno Award for Roots & Traditional Album of the Year - Solo for Love Songs for the Last 20. On April 11, 2011 Barber appeared as the musical guest and interview on the CBC Radio One show Q with Jian Ghomeshi. The show was taped live as a part of The Winnipeg Comedy Festival. Barber performed "Miles & Years" and "As Far As I Can Tell." Later in 2011, Barber's career continued to reach new heights when he won two Western Canadian Music Awards for Independent Album of the Year and Roots Solo Recording of the Year.

=== Headwaters and Prairieography (2012–2014) ===
In early 2012, Barber signed a deal with Six Shooter Records. Headwaters was released on May 1. The album was co-produced with Sam Kassirer in which thirty demo tracks were recorded before ten were chosen for the album. In support of the album, Barber embarked on a cross Canada tour opening for Old Man Luedecke. Barber had an album release show at the West End Cultural Centre in Winnipeg on October 26. He was nominated in the 2012 Canadian Folk Music Awards in the category of Solo Artist of the Year.

On September 17, 2013, True North Records announced that they signed Del. He released his first record on the label in February 2014. Four of the tracks were uploaded to his NoiseTrade page to promote the album. At the 2013 Western Canadian Music Awards, Barber once again took home the award for Roots Solo Recording of the Year for Headwaters.

The album entitled Prairieography was released on February 4, 2014. The album was co-produced by William "Bill" J. Western in Winnipeg at Empire Recording. Western also played in Barber's band. Part of the album was recorded in a silo in order to get the sound they wanted.

Barber embarked on a tour of the prairies from January 23 to March 27 in support of the album. Barber was nominated for three Canadian Folk Music Awards in the categories of Contemporary Singer of the Year, English Songwriter of the Year, and Solo Artist of the Year.

=== The Puck Drops Here and Easy Keeper (2016–2019) ===
With Prairieography being dubbed as what could have been a career-making opus, Barber moved from Winnipeg to a farm in rural Manitoba to begin work on a follow-up album.

On April 15, 2016; Barber along with the No Regretzkys released The Puck Drops Here through True North Records. With Barber being a hockey fan, this was a hockey themed album with distinct rock and country sounds. Barber was in contact with True North sending them demos of songs he had been working on, but received no feedback. Those songs would later be put on the album that would become Easy Keeper. After not getting any feedback on those demos, Barber had the idea for a hockey themed album as it was never done before.

It features covers of well-known songs such as Stompin' Tom Connors's "The Hockey Song," Coach's Corner segment of Hockey Night in Canada theme "Flame of Victory," and Tom Cochrane's "Big League." It also features covers of lesser known songs such as The Hanson Brothers' "Hockey Night Tonight" and Pursuit of Happiness' "Gretzky Rocks." Barber added some originals including "Hudson Bay Rules" and the single off the album "The Lights Go Out." The album was produced by Corb Lund guitarist Grant Siemens.

Barber's refusal to promote the album led to tensions between himself and the label. He was subsequently dropped by True North and his agent as a result.

On June 10, 2018; Barber started a Kickstarter campaign to raise money for his next album entitled Easy Keeper.. He stated that he took a hiatus and was now wanting to produce a new album. His goal was $7,500; but in less than a week, Barber was able to raise over $13,000. In total he was able to raise $23,021 towards the album.

On January 15, 2019; Mavens Music Management announced that Barber joined their management roster. On May 3, Barber posted on Instagram that the first single "No Easy Way Out" was released and premiered on the CBC Radio One show Q. Barber has said that "No Easy Way Out" is about a gas station attendant in Virden, Manitoba.

"She's been working there for decades. I finally was able to convince her to give me a bit of her story after modestly flirting with her for a few years. This is her story."

Also on May 3, Maven's Music announced the official Easy Keeper release date of September 6 and that Barber was signed to Acronym Records. On August 9, Barber announced on Instagram the release of the second single entitled "Patient Man."

On January 28, 2020; it was announced that Barber was nominated for a Juno Award in the category of Contemporary Roots Album of the Year for Easy Keeper. In the summer of 2020, with the announcement of the Western Canadian Music Awards, Barber was nominated in the categories of Roots Artist of the Year and Songwriter(s) of the Year.

=== Stray Dogs and Almanac (2021–present) ===
On June 23, 2021, Del Barber announced that through the winter, he worked on new music. The first single entitled "Meantime" was released on June 25. On July 2, Del announced Stray Dogs: Collected B-Sides Volume 1 was the next album that would be released on August 20. The second single "Nothing Left to Find" was released on July 23.

On June 8, 2022, the Western Canadian Music Awards nominations were announced. Barber was nominated in the category of Roots Artist of the Year.

On January 25, 2023, Barber announced his next album Almanac which was scheduled for a spring release. A video of him performing "Still Got You" was released. The song was officially released as a single on January 27. The second single "I Told You So" was released on March 10.

"I wrote it before my dad passed—before he was even sick, but it became an anthem for me in the months after his passing. Originally written from the perspective of Barber's neighbor who'd lost her husband, the song's interpretation of grief has such a universal quality that even Barber ended up applying to his own life, but maybe that was its purpose all along. "Looking back, I feel like this song was a gift from [my dad]."

The release date for Almanac was announced for April 28 Barber wrote Almanac on his farm in Inglis, Manitoba which is 400 km northwest of Winnipeg. He recorded the album at No Fun Club in Winnipeg. It took one week to record the album with Grant Siemens and Scott Franchuk.

"It was a really beautiful session. There were no grand intentions, just an aim to get good players and friends together and record a pile of my songs. Going into this session I really wanted to enjoy the process, not think too hard, and just keep it simple and honest. I had a group of great songs and I really didn't want to stand in their way."

== Contributions and collaborations ==
Aside from his own solo work, he has writing credits on Blake Berglund and the Vultures 2014 album Jasper where he co-wrote the first six songs. He also co-wrote "Funny Thing About You Leaving" with Berglund which is the B-side to Berglund's two-song single "Word's Gettin' Around" / "Funny Thing About You Leaving." He has writing credits on Manitoba country singer-songwriter Quinton Blair's 2016 EP Cash Crop.

== Personal life ==
Barber resides on a farm in Inglis, Manitoba with his wife Haylan, daughter Guthrie, and son Farley.

== Discography ==
Del Barber discography
- Studio albums: 7
- Singles: 6

=== Studio albums ===
Title	Details
Where the City Ends	Release date: April 10, 2009; Label: Corn Cob Music; Format: CD, digital download
Love Songs for the Last 20	Release date: June 15, 2010; Label: Corn Cob Music; Format: CD, digital download
Headwaters	Release date: May 1, 2012; Label: Six Shooter; Format: CD, vinyl, digital download
Praireography	Release date: February 4, 2014; Label: True North; Format: CD, digital download
The Puck Drops Here	Release date: April 15, 2016; Label: True North; Format: CD, digital download, streaming
Easy Keeper	Release date: September 20, 2019; Label: Acronym; Format: CD, vinyl, digital download, streaming
Stray Dogs (Collected B-Sides / Volume 1)	Release date: August 20, 2021; Label: Acronym; Format: Vinyl, digital download, streaming
Almanac	Release: April 28, 2023; Label: Acronym; Format: Vinyl, digital download, streaming

=== Singles ===
Title	Year	Album
"Running on a Wire"	2012	Headwaters
"Lights Go Out"	2016	The Puck Drops Here
"No Easy Way Out"	2019	Easy Keeper
"Patient Man"	2019	Easy Keeper
"Meantime"	2021	Stray Dogs (Collected B-Sides / Vol. 1)
"Nothing Left to Find"	2021	Stray Dogs (Collected B-Sides / Vol. 1)
"Still Got You"	2023	Almanac
"I Told You So"	2023	Almanac

== Awards and nominations ==
Del Barber awards and nominations
Awards and nominations
Award	Wins	Nominations
Canadian Folk Music Awards	0	4
Juno Awards	0	3
Western Canadian Music Awards	5	11

Totals (Note: Certain award groups do not simply award one winner. They acknowledge several different recipients, have runners-up, and have third place. Since this is a specific recognition and is different from losing an award, runner-up mentions are considered wins in this award tally. For simplification and to avoid errors, each award in this list has been presumed to have had a prior nomination.)
- Wins: 5
- Nominations: 17

Year	Nominated work	Event	Award	Result	Ref.
2010	Where the City Ends	Western Canadian Music Awards	Roots Solo Album of the Year	Nominated	
2011	Love Songs for the Last 20	Juno Awards	Roots & Traditional Album of the Year - Solo	Nominated	
2011	Love Songs for the Last 20	Western Canadian Music Awards	Independent Album of the Year	Won	
2011	Love Songs for the Last 20	Western Canadian Music Awards	Roots Solo Recording of the Year	Won	
2012	Himself	Canadian Folk Music Awards	Solo Artist of the Year	Nominated	
2013	Headwaters	Western Canadian Music Awards	Roots Solo Recording of the Year	Won	
2014	Himself	Canadian Folk Music Awards	Contemporary Singer of the Year	Nominated	
2014	Himself	Canadian Folk Music Awards	English Songwriter of the Year	Nominated	
2014	Himself	Canadian Folk Music Awards	Solo Artist of the Year	Nominated	
2014	Prairieogrpahy	Western Canadian Music Awards	Roots Solo Recording of the Year	Won	
2014	"Big Smoke"/Himself	Western Canadian Music Awards	Songwriter(s) of the Year	Won	
2015	Prairieography	Juno Awards	Roots & Traditional Album of the Year - Solo	Nominated	
2020	Easy Keeper	Juno Awards	Contemporary Roots Album of the Year	Nominated	
2020	Himself	Western Canadian Music Awards	Roots Artist of the Year	Nominated	
2020	Himself	Western Canadian Music Awards	Songwriter(s) of the Year	Nominated	
2022	Himself	Western Canadian Music Awards	Roots Artist of the Year	Nominated	
