= Lyalta =

- Hamlet
- Location of Lyalta Lyalta (Canada)
- Coordinates: 51°06′49″N 113°36′11″W
- Country: Canada
- Province: Alberta
- Region: Southern Alberta
- Census division: 5
- Municipal district: Wheatland County, Alberta

Government
  - Type: Unincorporated
  - Governing body: Wheatland County, Alberta Council

Area (2021)
  - Land: 1.74 km^{2} (0.67 sq mi)

Population (2021)
  - Total: 480
  - Density: 276.3/km^{2} (716/sq mi)
- Time zone: UTC−06:00 (Alberta Time)
- Area codes: 403, 587, 825

Lyalta is a hamlet in southern Alberta, Canada within Wheatland County. It is located 8 kilometres (5.0 mi) north of Highway 1, approximately 32 kilometres (20 mi) east of Calgary.

== Toponymy ==
Lyalta, originally named Lyall, was renamed around 1914 to avoid confusion with another Albertan settlement, also named Lyall, that existed concurrently. The name, a compound of the words Lyall and Alberta, was suggested by Harry Parsons, a local trader.

== History ==
=== Establishment: 1900–1920 ===
The settlement today known as Lyalta consisted of a handful of farms for the first decade of the 20th century, established by settlers from Calgary and the United States. In June 1913, the Canadian Northern Railway (CNR) announced plans to establish a train station in the settlement, which had come to be known as Lyall, as part of a passenger service connecting Calgary to Drumheller. The CNR station opened February 12, 1914.

George Rehder, postmaster of nearby Dalroy, opened a small general store in Lyall soon after the railway line's introduction. This store operated until 1919, when it encountered financial difficulties and closed down. Rehder employed Harry Parsons to run the shop and distribute mail.

At the time, another Albertan settlement was also named Lyall. To avoid confusion, Parsons suggested combining the words 'Alberta' and 'Lyall' to form a new name, Lyalta. The settlement was identified as Lyall in news reporting until January 1916; local press began referring to the area as Lyalta from July of that year.

=== Early development: 1920–1945 ===
After a Lyalta post office opened in 1923, a new general store was established two years later, with successive shop-keepers also serving as Lyalta's postmaster until 1962. The store and post office operated separately afterwards. The first grain elevator was established in Lyalta in 1923; in 1929, the Alberta Wheat Pool (AWP) also began operating an elevator in the hamlet.

Angus Urquhart, Lyalta's postmaster between 1926 and 1933, oversaw a troubled period of the office's operations. On September 19, 1927, Urquhart was tricked into honouring a fake money order provided by Bernard Laine, a harvest worker. Laine received six months imprisonment at Lethbridge Correctional Centre.

On January 2, 1931, Urquhart was the victim of an armed theft by four perpetrators who held Urquhart at gunpoint to demand $25 ($501 in constant dollars). When Urquhart resisted, one robber shot him, grazing him below his left arm. The group stole $32 overall ($641). Two suspects arrested soon after, Stanley Kresky and Mike Twardaloski, were also suspected of robbing a Bank of Toronto branch in Calgary, also in January. Urquhart identified Twardaloski as the shooter but could not identify Kresky, because the other perpetrators had worn masks. Proceedings against Kresky were stayed. Twardaloski pleaded guilty, receiving concurrent prison terms of five years for the crime in Lyalta and ten for the crime in Calgary.

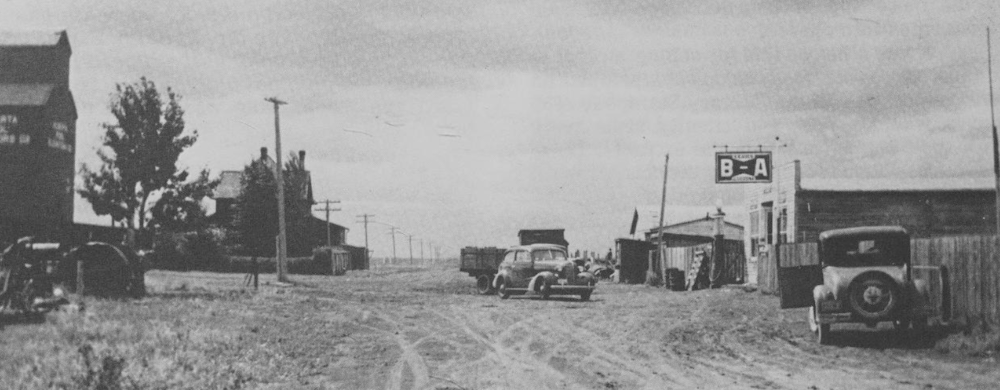
Lyalta's main road, photographed 1938.

In 1937 William Gorman closed a shop he had operated in the nearby settlement of Dunshalt (now part of Nightingale). He dismantled the structure and moved it in pieces to Lyalta, assembling it into a community centre named "Lyalta Hall." In 1945, he sold the building and its contents to the Lyalta Community Club, which continues to operate the space and host events as of 2025.

Between 1924 and 1945 Lyalta was the setting of at least three passenger train accidents. The first occurred January 28, 1924, when a CNR passenger train travelling between Lyalta and Ardenode derailed, in an incident attributed to a spread rail. Three cars were overturned and slid down a twelve-foot ditch. No serious injuries were reported, partly due to efforts to render aid by conductor Sam Jones, and two women who had been passengers: nurse M. P. Hendry, and Lyalta local, Etta Hurdman. The next two derailments occurred on December 12, 1929 and November 8, 1945, involving no cars overturning or injuries.

From the Lyalta–Dalroy–Ardenode regions, more than 50 men and women enlisted in Canada's war effort during the Second World War.

=== Post-war development: 1946–1999 ===
A rural electrification association was founded for Lyalta in 1949. By November of that year, work had begun on establishing infrastructure to provide electricity to Lyalta. Lyalta, and its name, was approved as a locality for mapping purposes by the Government of Alberta in 1955.

Express and passenger rail service to Lyalta was discontinued in 1964, and the original station house was demolished. Trains carrying freight, particularly crops from local farms, continued.

In the 1970s, AWP designed a modern grain elevator structure termed the "Buffalo slope," replacing the traditional wooden frame with precast concrete. Buffalo designs were also able to hold 170,000 bushels or more, whereas traditional elevators typically held up to 40,000 bushels. AWP constructed its first Buffalo slope in 1979 in Magrath, and its second in Lyalta in 1982. At 30 metres wide and 33 metres high, the Lyalta elevator cost $1.3 million to build ($3,888,160 today), with a capacity of 190,000 bushels. The project consolidated several local elevators.

=== Modern development: 2000–present ===
In 2008, the Canadian National Railway (CN) announced plans to end freight rail services along the 286-kilometre line between Lyalta and Oyen. CN gave formal notice of its intention to abandon the line in 2009, citing an insufficient business case for keeping it open, and put the line up for sale in December of that year.

Investors and producers from areas that would be affected by the closure formed a corporation, Badlands Railway Company, to bid on the line, but their offer was ultimately unsuccessful. In March 2023, the Government of Alberta, Canada Infrastructure Bank and Oyen Regional Rail Company announced a memorandum of understanding to conduct a feasibility study of restoring the line.

Also in March 2023, Wheatland County's municipal government incorporated the Lakes of Muirfield, a residential community that contains a golf course, into the Hamlet of Lyalta.

== Governance ==
Lyalta lies within the municipal district of Wheatland County. The County adopted a strategy to expand the hamlet in 2011.

== Demographics ==
Population history of Lyalta
Year	Pop.	±%
1981	19	—
1986	17	−10.5%
1991	20	+17.6%
1996	17	−15.0%
2001	21	+23.5%
2006	22	+4.8%
2011	26	+18.2%
2016	28	+7.7%
2016R	344	+1128.6%
2021	480	+39.5%
Source: Statistics Canada

In the 2021 Census of Population conducted by Statistics Canada, Lyalta had a population of 480 living in 174 of its 178 total private dwellings, a change of 39.5% from its 2016 population of 344. With a land area of 1.74 km^{2} (0.67 sq mi), it had a population density of 275.9/km^{2} (714.5/sq mi) in 2021.

As a designated place in the 2016 Census of Population conducted by Statistics Canada, Lyalta had a population of 28 living in 8 of its 9 total private dwellings, a change of 7.7% from its 2011 population of 26. With a land area of 0.15 km^{2} (0.058 sq mi), it had a population density of 186.7/km^{2} (483.5/sq mi) in 2016.

== See also ==
- List of communities in Alberta
- List of designated places in Alberta
- List of hamlets in Alberta
