= Cluny, Alberta =

Cluny
- Hamlet
- Location of Cluny in Alberta
- Coordinates: 50.83649°N 112.86667°W
- Country: Canada
- Province: Alberta
- Census division: No. 5
- Municipal district: Wheatland County

Government
  - Type: Unincorporated
  - Reeve: Glenn Koester
  - Governing body: Wheatland County Council: Ben Armstrong; Berniece Bland; Alice Booth; Rex Harwood; Brenda Knight; Glenn Koester; Donald Vander Velde

Area (2021)
  - Land: 0.69 km^{2} (0.27 sq mi)
- Elevation: 877 m (2,877 ft)

Population (2021)
  - Total: 50
  - Density: 72.7/km^{2} (188/sq mi)
- Time zone: UTC−06:00 (Alberta Time)

Cluny is a hamlet in Alberta, Canada within Wheatland County. It is 3 kilometres (1.9 mi) south of Highway 1 on a Canadian Pacific Kansas City railway line and Highway 843, approximately 87 kilometres (54 mi) southeast of Calgary. It has an elevation of 570 metres (1,870 ft).

The hamlet is in Census Division No. 5 and in the federal riding of Crowfoot.

The hamlet takes its name from the Parish of Cluny in Scotland.

== Demographics ==
In the 2021 Census of Population conducted by Statistics Canada, Cluny had a population of 50 living in 24 of its 33 total private dwellings, a change of −28.6% from its 2016 population of 70. With a land area of 0.69 km^{2} (0.27 sq mi), it had a population density of 72.5/km^{2} (187.7/sq mi) in 2021.

As a designated place in the 2016 Census of Population conducted by Statistics Canada, Cluny had a population of 70 living in 32 of its 41 total private dwellings, a change of 16.7% from its 2011 population of 60. With a land area of 0.69 km^{2} (0.27 sq mi), it had a population density of 101.4/km^{2} (262.8/sq mi) in 2016.

== See also ==
- List of communities in Alberta
- List of designated places in Alberta
- List of former urban municipalities in Alberta
- List of hamlets in Alberta
