= Namaka, Alberta =

Namaka
- Hamlet
- Location of Namaka Namaka (Canada)
- Coordinates: 50°57′31″N 113°17′33″W
- Country: Canada
- Province: Alberta
- Region: Southern Alberta
- Census division: 5
- Municipal district: Wheatland County, Alberta

Government
  - Type: Unincorporated
  - Governing body: Wheatland County, Alberta Council

Area (2021)
  - Land: 0.31 km^{2} (0.12 sq mi)

Population (2021)
  - Total: 72
  - Density: 229.5/km^{2} (594/sq mi)
- Time zone: UTC−06:00 (Alberta Time)
- Area codes: 403, 587, 825

Namaka is a hamlet in southern Alberta, Canada within Wheatland County. It is located approximately 10 kilometres (6.2 mi) south of Highway 1 and 55 kilometres (34 mi) east of Calgary. Its name means "near the water" in Blackfoot. The first school was built in 1909.

== Demographics ==
Population history of Namaka
Year	Pop.	±%
1981	19	—
1986	33	+73.7%
1991	45	+36.4%
1996	53	+17.8%
2001	57	+7.5%
2006	64	+12.3%
2011	71	+10.9%
2016	50	−29.6%
2016R	85	+70.0%
2021	72	−15.3%
Source: Statistics Canada

In the 2021 Census of Population conducted by Statistics Canada, Namaka had a population of 72 living in 25 of its 26 total private dwellings, a change of −15.3% from its 2016 population of 85. With a land area of 0.31 km^{2} (0.12 sq mi), it had a population density of 232.3/km^{2} (601.5/sq mi) in 2021.

As a designated place in the 2016 Census of Population conducted by Statistics Canada, Namaka had a population of 50 living in 21 of its 21 total private dwellings, a change of −29.6% from its 2011 population of 71. With a land area of 0.13 km^{2} (0.050 sq mi), it had a population density of 384.6/km^{2} (996.1/sq mi) in 2016.

== See also ==
- List of communities in Alberta
- List of designated places in Alberta
- List of hamlets in Alberta
