= Covenant Bible College =

College in Alberta, Canada

Covenant Bible College (CBC), or Covenant Bible College Canada (CBC-Canada), was a vocational Bible college. It closed in 2007. The last campus was held in Strathmore, Alberta.

== History ==
=== Roots ===
CBC-Canada began in 1941 in Norquay, Saskatchewan, under the name Covenant Bible Institution. The idea of this institute/college would come out of the Canada Conference of the Evangelical Covenant Church. Originally it was a three-year course, but by 1957 it became a two-year course, and in 1962 CBI (Covenant Bible Institute) was condensed into a one-year program. During its first 50 years, CBI/CBC was led by Joel Peterson and Wendell Anderson. During that time, the class size would range anywhere from 25 to 45 students with the central focus being the equipping of young adults to serve the church as Biblically literate and spiritually formed lay persons.

=== Prince Albert, Saskatchewan campus ===
Covenant Bible College relocated to Prince Albert, Saskatchewan, in 1944. It remained in Prince Albert until it moved to Strathmore in 1995.

=== Strathmore, Alberta campus ===
Strathmore, Alberta, is located 30 minutes east of Calgary. The campus is situated on 5 acres (2 ha) of land. CBC-Canada offers students four dorms that house 22 students each. Each dorm contains single and double rooms, space to lounge about, a games room, laundry room, and kitchen. For easier access, the dorms are connected to the building for convenience during the winter months. The campus also has an administration building with classrooms, library, cafeteria and a full size gym with hardwood floor.

== Events ==
Each year CBC-Canada held several events. Many of the events are geared towards youth of junior and senior high school ages.

=== Extreme Impact ===
Extreme Impact, or just Extreme as it was commonly called, was a weekend youth conference held in March. It was planned and organized by each year's class as part of the campus commitment to providing opportunities in ministry. Students received the opportunity to serve in the name of Jesus. The students also had the chance to uncover and utilize the many gifts they possess, while at the same time, leading younger students and youth leaders in a weekend of worship and discipleship.

=== Jr. High Jam ===
Jr. High Jam was a weekend youth conference held during the May long weekend, targeted towards junior high students from grades 7–9.

== Closure ==
After 66 years in operation Covenant Bible College ceased operations. The cause of the closure was declining enrollment and donations. The former CBC campus was sold for $5.5 million. It was sold to another Christian organization EnCharis.

== Notable alumni ==
- Del Barber, singer-songwriter and musician
