= Division No. 5, Alberta =

Census division in Canada

Coordinates: 51°02′24″N 113°24′00″W

Division No. 5
- Census division in Alberta
- Country: Canada
- Province: Alberta

Area
  - Total: 16,775 km^{2} (6,477 sq mi)

Population (2021)
  - Total: 55,784
  - Density: 3.3254/km^{2} (8.6128/sq mi)

Division No. 5 is a census division in Alberta, Canada. It is located in the north-central portion of southern Alberta and its largest urban community is the Town of Strathmore.

== Census subdivisions ==
The following census subdivisions (municipalities or municipal equivalents) are located within Alberta's Division No. 5.

- Towns
  - Drumheller
  - Strathmore
  - Three Hills
  - Trochu
  - Vulcan
- Villages
  - Acme
  - Arrowwood
  - Carbon
  - Carmangay
  - Champion
  - Delia
  - Hussar
  - Linden
  - Lomond
  - Milo
  - Morrin
  - Munson
  - Rockyford
  - Standard
- Municipal districts
  - Kneehill County
  - Starland County
  - Vulcan County
  - Wheatland County
- Indian reserves
  - Siksika 146
- Hamlets
  - Ardenode
  - Bircham
  - Brant
  - Carseland
  - Chancellor
  - Cheadle
  - Cluny
  - Craigmyle
  - Ensign
  - Gleichen
  - Herronton
  - Hesketh
  - Huxley
  - Kirkcaldy
  - Lyalta
  - Michichi
  - Mossleigh
  - Namaka
  - Nightingale
  - Queenstown
  - Rosebud
  - Rowley
  - Rumsey
  - Shouldice
  - Sunnyslope
  - Swalwell
  - Torrington
  - Travers
  - Wimborne

== Demographics ==
Historical population
| Year | Pop. | ±% |
|---|---|---|
| 1991 | 39,658 | — |
| 1996 | 43,565 | +9.9% |
| 2001 | 47,606 | +9.3% |
| 2006 | 51,104 | +7.3% |
| 2011 | 53,263 | +4.2% |
| 2016 | 55,708 | +4.6% |
| 2021 | 55,784 | +0.1% |

In the 2021 Census of Population conducted by Statistics Canada, Division No. 5 had a population of 55,784 living in 20,451 of its 22,579 total private dwellings, a change of 0.1% from its 2016 population of 55,708. With a land area of 16,651.23 km^{2} (6,429.08 sq mi), it had a population density of 3.4/km^{2} (8.7/sq mi) in 2021.

== See also ==
- List of census divisions of Alberta
- List of communities in Alberta
