= Huxley, Alberta =

Huxley
- Hamlet
- Location of Huxley Huxley (Canada)
- Coordinates: 51.921°N 113.233°W
- Country: Canada
- Province: Alberta
- Region: Southern Alberta
- Census division: 5
- Municipal district: Kneehill County

Government
  - Type: Unincorporated
  - Governing body: Kneehill County Council

Area (2021)
  - Land: 0.33 km^{2} (0.13 sq mi)

Population (2021)
  - Total: 75
  - Density: 230.1/km^{2} (596/sq mi)
- Time zone: UTC−06:00 (Alberta Time)
- Area codes: 403, 587, 825

Huxley is a hamlet in southern Alberta, Canada within Kneehill County. It is located approximately 160 km (99 mi) northeast of Calgary. The first school was built in 1907 and named Ashcroft for John Courtland Ash, the first rancher in the area, predating the surveying of the area into homesteads.

The community has the name of Thomas Henry Huxley, an English biologist.

== Demographics ==
Population history of Huxley
Year	Pop.	±%
1941	66	—
1951	87	+31.8%
1956	123	+41.4%
1961	102	−17.1%
1966	76	−25.5%
1971	68	−10.5%
1976	53	−22.1%
1981	72	+35.8%
1986	70	−2.8%
1991	78	+11.4%
1991A	81	+3.8%
1996	77	−4.9%
2001	80	+3.9%
2006	89	+11.3%
2011	85	−4.5%
2016	75	−11.8%
2021	75	+0.0%
Source: Statistics Canada

In the 2021 Census of Population conducted by Statistics Canada, Huxley had a population of 75 living in 38 of its 39 total private dwellings, a change of 0% from its 2016 population of 75. With a land area of 0.33 km^{2} (0.13 sq mi), it had a population density of 227.3/km^{2} (588.6/sq mi) in 2021.

As a designated place in the 2016 Census of Population conducted by Statistics Canada, Huxley had a population of 75 living in 33 of its 36 total private dwellings, a change of −11.8% from its 2011 population of 85. With a land area of 0.32 km^{2} (0.12 sq mi), it had a population density of 234.4/km^{2} (607.0/sq mi) in 2016.

== See also ==
- List of communities in Alberta
- List of designated places in Alberta
- List of hamlets in Alberta
