= Chancellor, Alberta =

Chancellor
- Hamlet
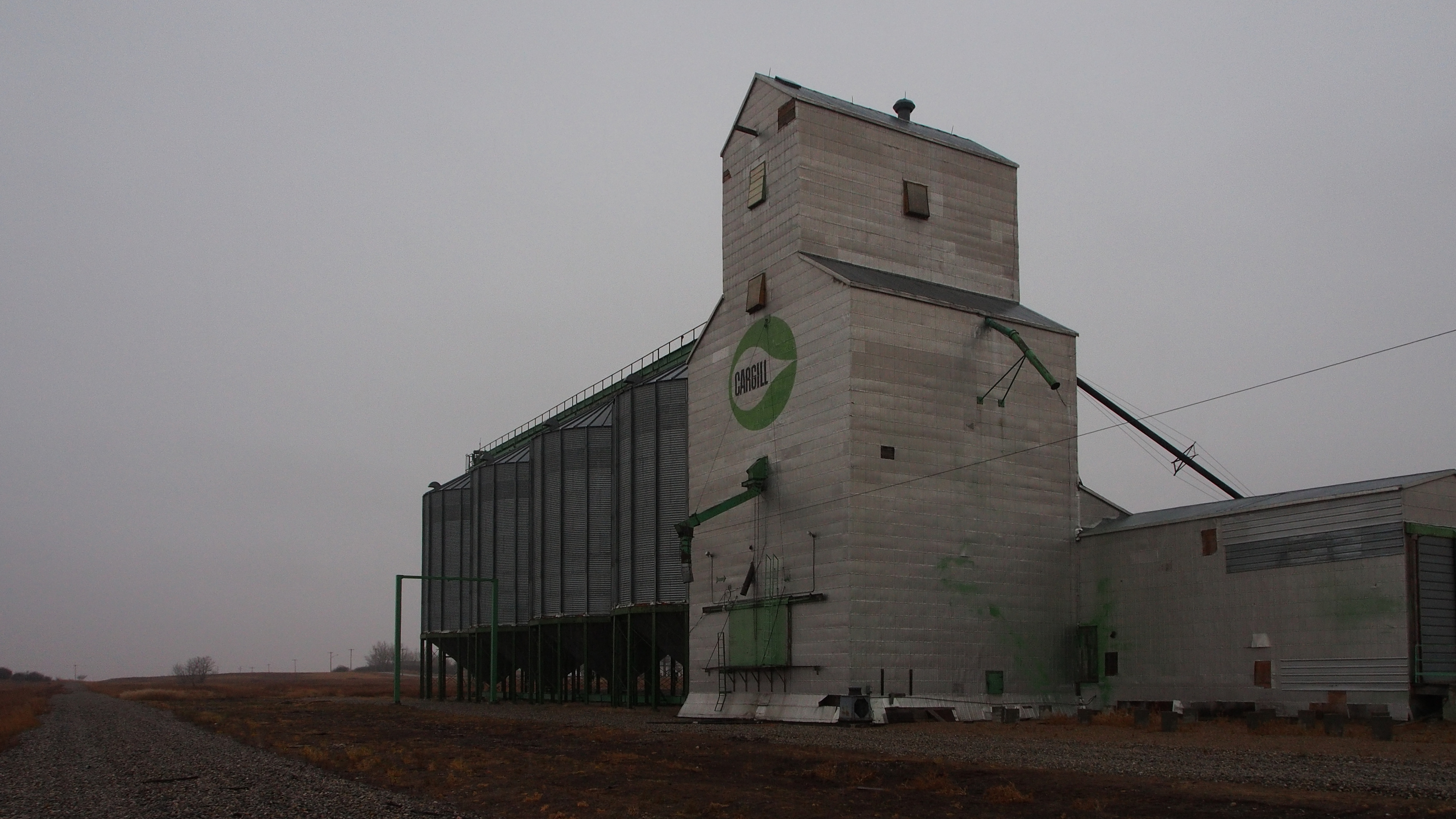
- Chancellor Grain Elevator

- Location of Chancellor Chancellor (Canada)
- Coordinates: 51°05′07″N 112°50′02″W
- Country: Canada
- Province: Alberta
- Region: Southern Alberta
- Census division: 5
- Municipal district: Wheatland County, Alberta

Government
  - Type: Unincorporated
  - Governing body: Wheatland County, Alberta Council

Area (2021)
  - Land: 0.32 km^{2} (0.12 sq mi)

Population (2021)
  - Total: 5
  - Density: 15.5/km^{2} (40/sq mi)
- Time zone: UTC−06:00 (Alberta Time)
- Area codes: 403, 587, 825

Chancellor is a hamlet in southern Alberta, Canada within Wheatland County. It is located approximately 26 kilometres (16 mi) north of Highway 1 and 86 kilometres (53 mi) east of Calgary.

Chancellor originally was built up chiefly by Germans, who named the hamlet after the office of Chancellor of Germany. It got its first post office in 1918 which was lost in a fire in 1930 along with most of the original buildings, with the memorial hall being the only original building standing.

== Demographics ==
Population history of Chancellor
Year	Pop.	±%
1981	25	—
1986	14	−44.0%
1991	16	+14.3%
1996	16	+0.0%
2001	10	−37.5%
2006	5	−50.0%
2011	5	+0.0%
2016	5	+0.0%
2021	5	+0.0%
Source: Statistics Canada

In the 2021 Census of Population conducted by Statistics Canada, Chancellor had a population of 5 living in 2 of its 4 total private dwellings, a change of 0% from its 2016 population of 5. With a land area of 0.32 km^{2} (0.12 sq mi), it had a population density of 15.6/km^{2} (40.5/sq mi) in 2021.

As a designated place in the 2016 Census of Population conducted by Statistics Canada, Chancellor had a population of 5 living in 3 of its 3 total private dwellings, a change of 0% from its 2011 population of 5. With a land area of 0.32 km^{2} (0.12 sq mi), it had a population density of 15.6/km^{2} (40.5/sq mi) in 2016.

== See also ==
- List of communities in Alberta
- List of designated places in Alberta
- List of hamlets in Alberta
