= Rosebud, Alberta =

Rosebud
- Hamlet
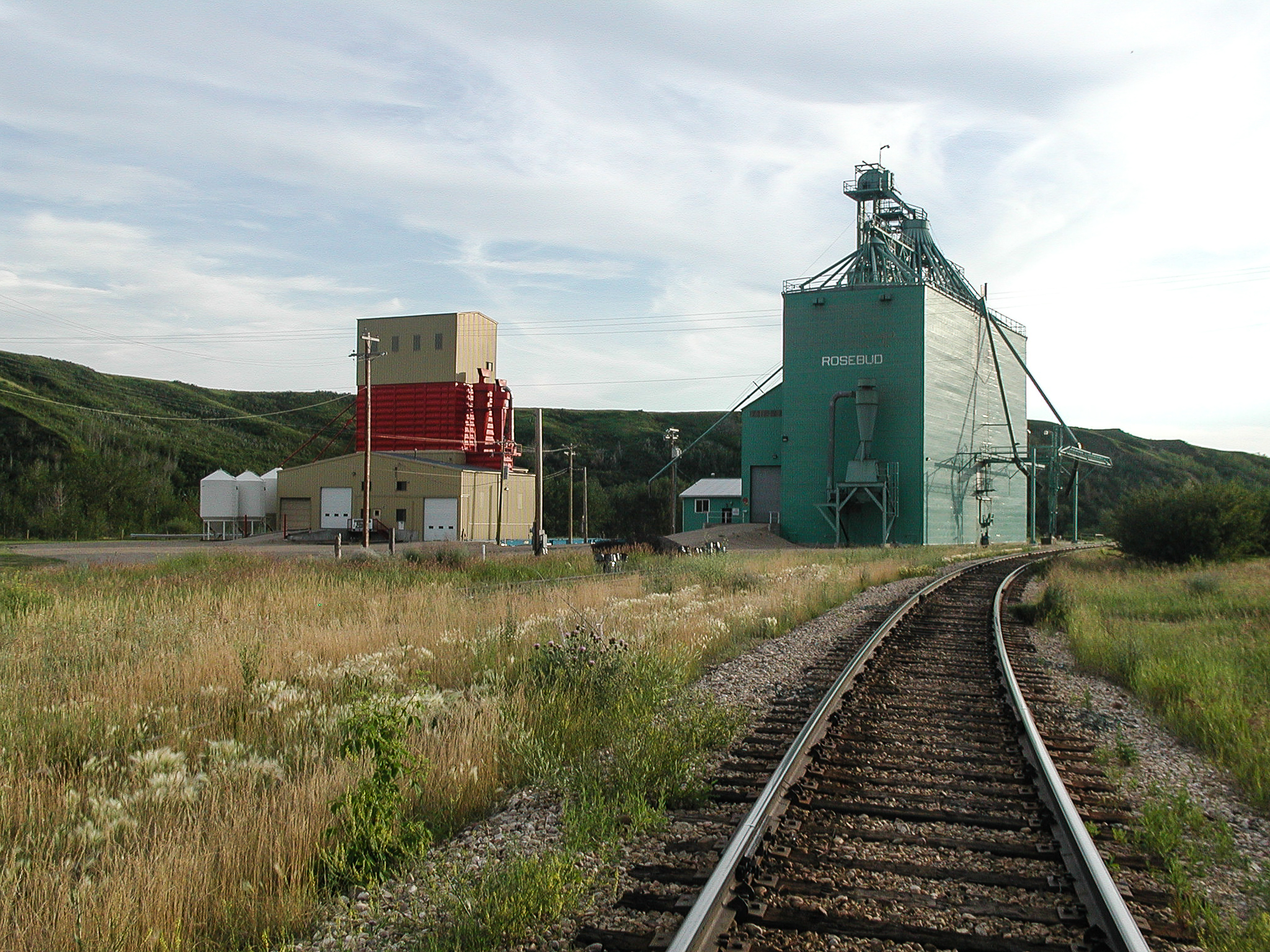
- Rosebud Grain Elevator

- Location within Alberta
- Coordinates: 51.300°N 112.951°W
- Country: Canada
- Province: Alberta
- Region: Southern Alberta
- Municipal district: Wheatland County
- Dissolved: January 1, 1946

Area (2021)
  - Land: 0.73 km^{2} (0.28 sq mi)

Population (2021)
  - Total: 112
  - Density: 153.4/km^{2} (397/sq mi)
- Time zone: UTC−06:00 (Alberta Time)
- Postal code: T0J 2T0
- Area code: +1-403
- Highways: Highway 840
- Waterways: Rosebud River

Rosebud, Alberta is a hamlet in southern Alberta, Canada within Wheatland County. Previously an incorporated municipality, Rosebud dissolved from village status on January 1, 1946, to become part of the Municipal District of Grasswold No. 248.

Rosebud is located on Highway 840, approximately 100 kilometres (62 mi) northeast of Calgary and 25 kilometres (16 mi) southwest of Drumheller. It sits in a sheltered valley on the Rosebud River near the edge of the Canadian Badlands. This area was called Akokiniskway by the [[Cree]] people, which translates roughly to "by the river of many roses".

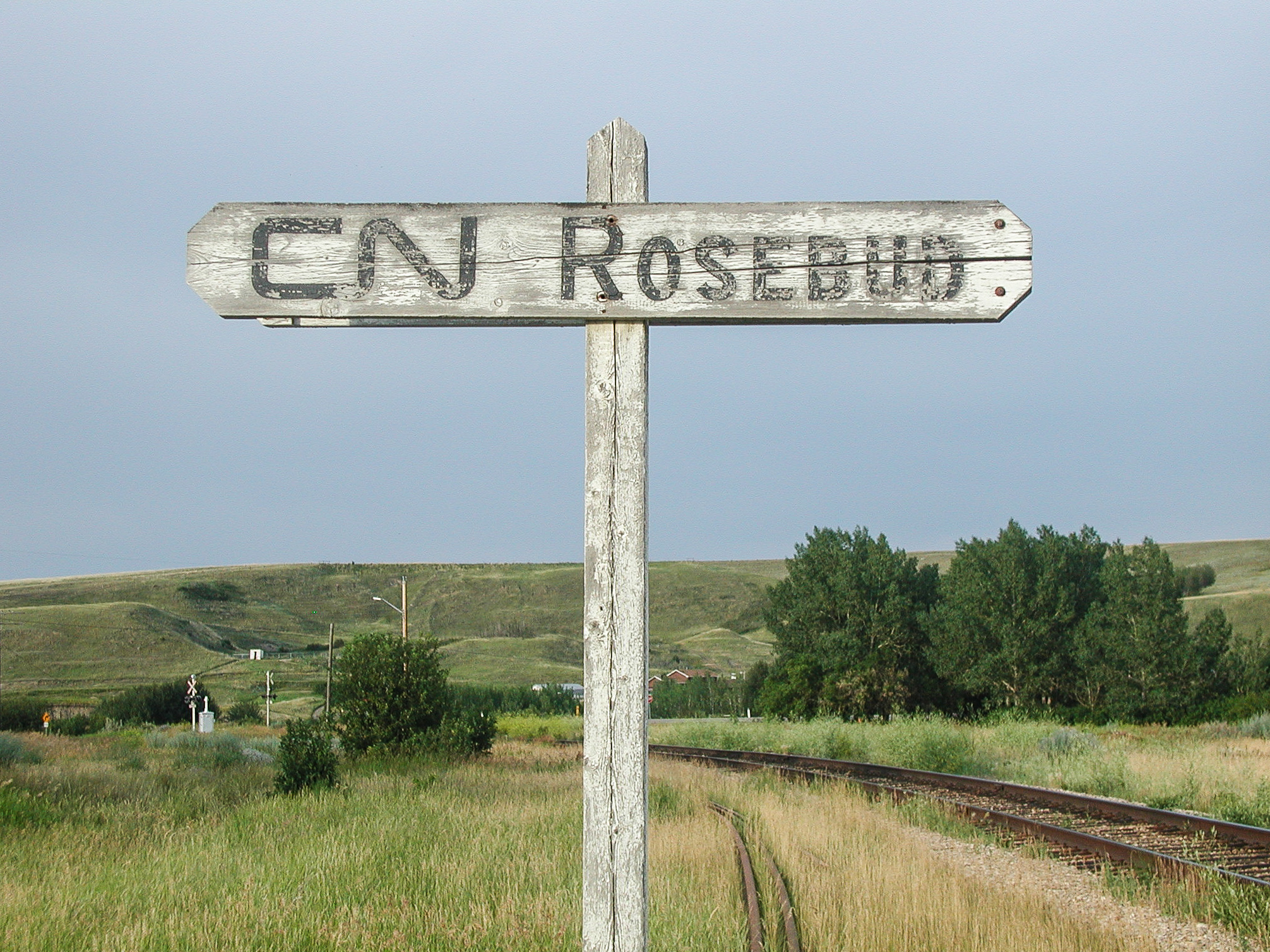
Canadian National Railway sign for Rosebud, Alberta.

== History ==
The valley was settled in 1885 by James and Eliza Wishart. While following the Gleichen Trail to Montana with his family, fleeing the persecution of Metis people following the Red River Settlement uprising, they awoke to the river valley covered by wild roses, Alberta's official flower. Wishart then reportedly said, "Here's the promised land, we go no further."

In the early 20th century the Canadian Northern Railway built a railway line through the town, along the Goose Lake Line between Calgary and Saskatoon. The first rail service through Rosebud occurred on February 12, 1914, when the line was completed between Drumheller and Calgary. The rail station in Rosebud was a simple coal-heated boxcar until 1919 when the first proper station building was constructed.

The beauty of the valley has attracted many people throughout the years, from nature lovers to artists. Notable artists including A. Y. Jackson, a member of the Group of Seven, and Henry George Glyde, spent a summer in 1944 painting in the area.

Over the years, farming and coal mining have been the primary industries. In 1972 the Severn Creek School was shut down as part of an Alberta wide education consolidating process and local children were bused to Standard and Drumheller. This resulted in many of the local businesses being closed and the hamlet population dropped to under a dozen people. However, the farming community of around 400 still support a seed cleaning plant.

Easter 1973, a group of young adults from Calgary brought about 40 teenagers out and camped in the then empty mercantile. This pilot event evolved into a summer camp initially funded by a grant from the Alberta government and then supported as Rosebud Camp of the Arts by Crescent Heights Baptist Church in Calgary. In 1977 a high school was founded using the old buildings of the town as classrooms and emphasizing practical, visual, music and the performing arts in its curriculum. In the 1980s, Rosebud School of the Arts began to run theatre, which eventually developed into Rosebud Theatre and the school shifted its emphasis to post-secondary education. Today Rosebud Theatre & School of the Arts runs as a fully professional company that offers programming year round and is a tourist attraction drawing patrons from Calgary, Edmonton and all around the world.

== Demographics ==
In the 2021 Census of Population conducted by Statistics Canada, Rosebud had a population of 112 living in 43 of its 54 total private dwellings, a change of 28.7% from its 2016 population of 87. With a land area of 0.73 km^{2} (0.28 sq mi), it had a population density of 153.4/km^{2} (397.4/sq mi) in 2021.

As a designated place in the 2016 Census of Population conducted by Statistics Canada, Rosebud had a population of 87 living in 29 of its 30 total private dwellings, a change of −1.1% from its 2011 population of 88. With a land area of 0.29 km^{2} (0.11 sq mi), it had a population density of 300.0/km^{2} (777.0/sq mi) in 2016.

== Economy ==
Currently the primary industries within the hamlet are tourism and the arts, with the Rosebud Theatre drawing an estimated 40,000 visitors to the hamlet annually. The theatre grew out of church outreach program for Calgary youth. The hamlet contains the Rosebud Memorial Hall, numerous Bed & Breakfasts, a Country Inn, Rosebud Centennial Museum - the only public museum in Wheatland County as well as gift shops and artist studios. Agriculture along with oil and gas production are significant industries in the surrounding area.

== See also ==
- List of communities in Alberta
- List of designated places in Alberta
- List of former urban municipalities in Alberta
- List of hamlets in Alberta
