= Nightingale, Alberta =

Nightingale
- Hamlet
- Location of Nightingale Nightingale (Canada)
- Coordinates: 51°09′37″N 113°19′59″W
- Country: Canada
- Province: Alberta
- Region: Southern Alberta
- Census division: 5
- Municipal district: Wheatland County, Alberta

Government
  - Type: Unincorporated
  - Governing body: Wheatland County, Alberta Council

Area (2021)
  - Land: 0.17 km^{2} (0.066 sq mi)

Population (2021)
  - Total: 37
  - Density: 214.6/km^{2} (556/sq mi)
- Time zone: UTC−06:00 (Alberta Time)
- Area codes: 403, 587, 825

Nightingale is a hamlet in southern Alberta, Canada within Wheatland County. It is located 4 kilometres (2.5 mi) west of Highway 21, approximately 53 kilometres (33 mi) east of Calgary.

== Toponymy ==
Nightingale is named after Florence Nightingale.

== Geography ==
Nightingale, like most of Wheatland County, is generally flat, with some rugged topography on its eastern border towards Drumheller. Several wetlands and marshes fall within the Nightingale area. The hamlet marks the approximate halfway point of Serviceberry Creek.

Writing in 1979, a local history by the Nightingale Community Association described the hamlet's soil as loamy and alluvial. In 2016, Wheatland County described the soil around Nightingale's settlements as presenting "severe to... very severe" limitations for agriculture in 2016.

== History ==
=== Founding: 1904-1909 ===
In 1904, the Canadian Pacific Railway (CPR) purchased three million acres of land in Treaty 7 territory between Medicine Hat and Calgary. To make the dry plains suitable for agriculture, the CPR implemented an irrigation system to divert water from the Bow River to a man-made reservoir, later named Chestermere Lake.

Hoping to encourage permanent settlement in southern Alberta, the CPR began selling the irrigated land. Lots were offered with a house, barn and well already erected. Furthermore, the lots were grouped together in ready-made farming colonies. Most early purchasers were American speculators who intended to resell the lots for profit.

The CPR, believing that British families would be likelier to establish permanent farms, began advertising to this demographic. This followed an aggressive advertising campaign overseen by then-Minister of the Interior, Clifford Sifton, to encourage Europeans to move to Western Canada. Aiming to portray the region as an attractive place to live, the Ministry targeted Europe's agricultural working class through exhibitions, promotional materials, and editorials in foreign newspapers.

=== Naming and early difficulties: 1910-12 ===
Nightingale, as one of the areas promoted to British families, received the first group of settlers from Britain March 25, 1910. The inaugural party comprised twenty-four families. Initially, the area was known informally as the 'English colony,' though most arrivals were Scottish, Welsh, or from Ireland.

Early arrivals were disappointed by their properties. The buildings were smaller than expected, without appropriate insulation for the area's cold winters; some had not yet been entirely built. Some farmers found the area's alkaline soil "almost worthless" for growing crops. The colony experienced poor weather in its first two years of existence. The irrigation system that had carried CPR's advertising was not complete until 1911, so fields of winter wheat perished over a dry, cold winter. Dry weather persisted into the spring of 1911, accompanied by hail and strong winds that damaged acres of wheat and potatoes. Many of Nightingale's original arrivals left within three years, due to financial difficulties or disillusionment.

Nonetheless, not all settlers chose to leave. The settlement received a name in August 1910, when the CPR announced plans to establish a railway stop in the colony. Residents called a meeting to select a formal name and, owing to the recent death of Florence Nightingale, decided to name the settlement in her honour. In January 1911, a post office bearing the same name was established for the area, and a school opened in July of the same year. A general store, lumber yard, restaurant and blacksmith also opened in Nightingale over the course of 1911. The CPR line was completed in 1912, which brought renewed interest to the locality.

=== Development: 1913-1949 ===
Residents began raising money for a community hall in 1913, which opened in December 1914. Also that year, Nightingale began hosting an annual sports day. Residents of nearby localities participated by forming teams, representing their area in events such as horse racing, tug of war and baseball. This event continued until at least 1947.

The hamlet's Anglican population was served by the St. Michael & All Angels Anglican Church in nearby Strathmore. (The church closed in April 2025.) Visiting priests initially gave sermons in the homes of residents, then Nightingale Hall. By the Second World War, these sermons were discontinued as congregants began attending in Strathmore, though the Hall continued to host services for special occasions like Christmas. Sunday Schools ran in Nightingale School intermittently until the end of the 1940s.

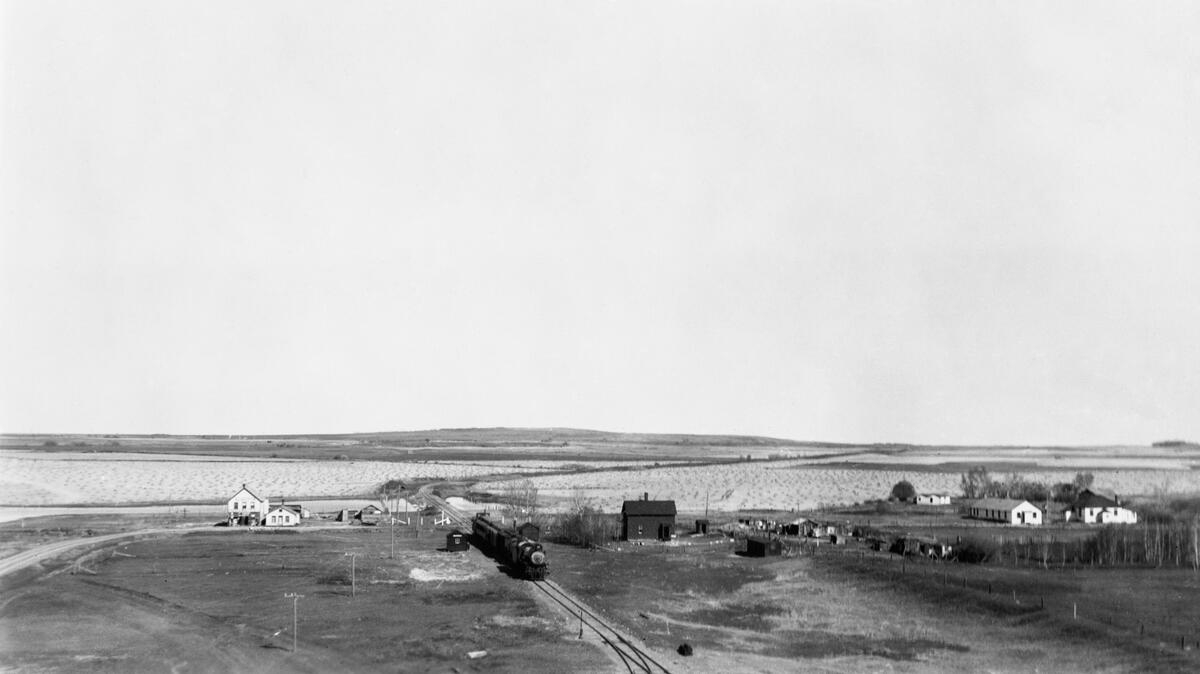
Nightingale, Alberta, 1944. The store is visible on the left; the community hall is the white building on the right.

In 1914, Nightingale hosted its first annual sports day, an event that ran until at least 1947. Residents of nearby localities formed teams to represent their areas in events including horse racing, tug of war and baseball.

Nightingale's first grain elevator opened in 1917 by the Alberta Pacific Grain Company, with a capacity of 30,000 bushels. A second elevator was established in 1929 by the private farmer's co-operative, Alberta Wheat Pool, with a capacity of 35,000 bushels.

No polling stations operated in Nightingale for the 1921 federal general election, but two opened for the 1925 election. A total of 181 electors used the stations, with the majority (61) casting their ballot for Edward Joseph Garland, Progressive Party of Canada candidate. One polling station operated in Nightingale for the 1926 election, with 83 of a total 92 electors voting to re-elect Garland. 93 voters cast their vote in Nightingale for the 1930 election; 73 backed Garland.

At least 24 men and women from Nightingale enlisted in the Canadian war effort during the Second World War.

=== Decline and revival: 1950-present ===
By 1951, Nightingale School had 21 students, of which just 6 were from Nightingale. 15 from the wider Serviceberry area, and they attended by bus. The school closed permanently on June 30, 1952, and students began attending facilities in Strathmore. Both grain elevators in Nightingale operated until 1972-73, when they were torn down.

A new community hall was built in 1969, after structural problems with the original were identified in the mid-1960s.

Nightingale recorded a population low of 5 in the 2001 Canadian census. Since then, the population has seen a modest revival, recording 37 residents in 2021.

In October 2014, Nightingale celebrated its centennial, marking the 1914 opening of its Hall as its start as a community. In attendance was 92-year-old Clarence Robert “Cy” Putnam, lifelong resident and farmer. Speaking to the Strathmore Times about the event, Putnam described having left Nightingale for a significant period only twice: first to attend agricultural college, secondly to serve as a pilot with the Royal Canadian Air Force during WWII. Putnam died in 2023.

As of 2025, Nightingale Community Hall remains operational.

== Demographics ==
Population history of Nightingale
Year	Pop.	±%
1991	11	—
1996	13	+18.2%
2001	5	−61.5%
2006	10	+100.0%
2011	15	+50.0%
2016	32	+113.3%
2021	37	+15.6%
Source: Statistics Canada

In the 2021 Census of Population conducted by Statistics Canada, Nightingale had a population of 37 living in 10 of its 10 total private dwellings, a change of 15.6% from its 2016 population of 32. With a land area of 0.17 km^{2} (0.066 sq mi), it had a population density of 217.6/km^{2} (563.7/sq mi) in 2021.

As a designated place in the 2016 Census of Population conducted by Statistics Canada, Nightingale had a population of 32 living in 10 of its 10 total private dwellings, a change of 113.3% from its 2011 population of 15. With a land area of 0.02 km^{2} (0.0077 sq mi), it had a population density of 1,600.0/km^{2} (4,144.0/sq mi) in 2016.

== See also ==
- List of communities in Alberta
- List of designated places in Alberta
- List of hamlets in Alberta
