= Wheatland County, Alberta =

Municipal district in Alberta, Canada

Wheatland County
- Municipal district
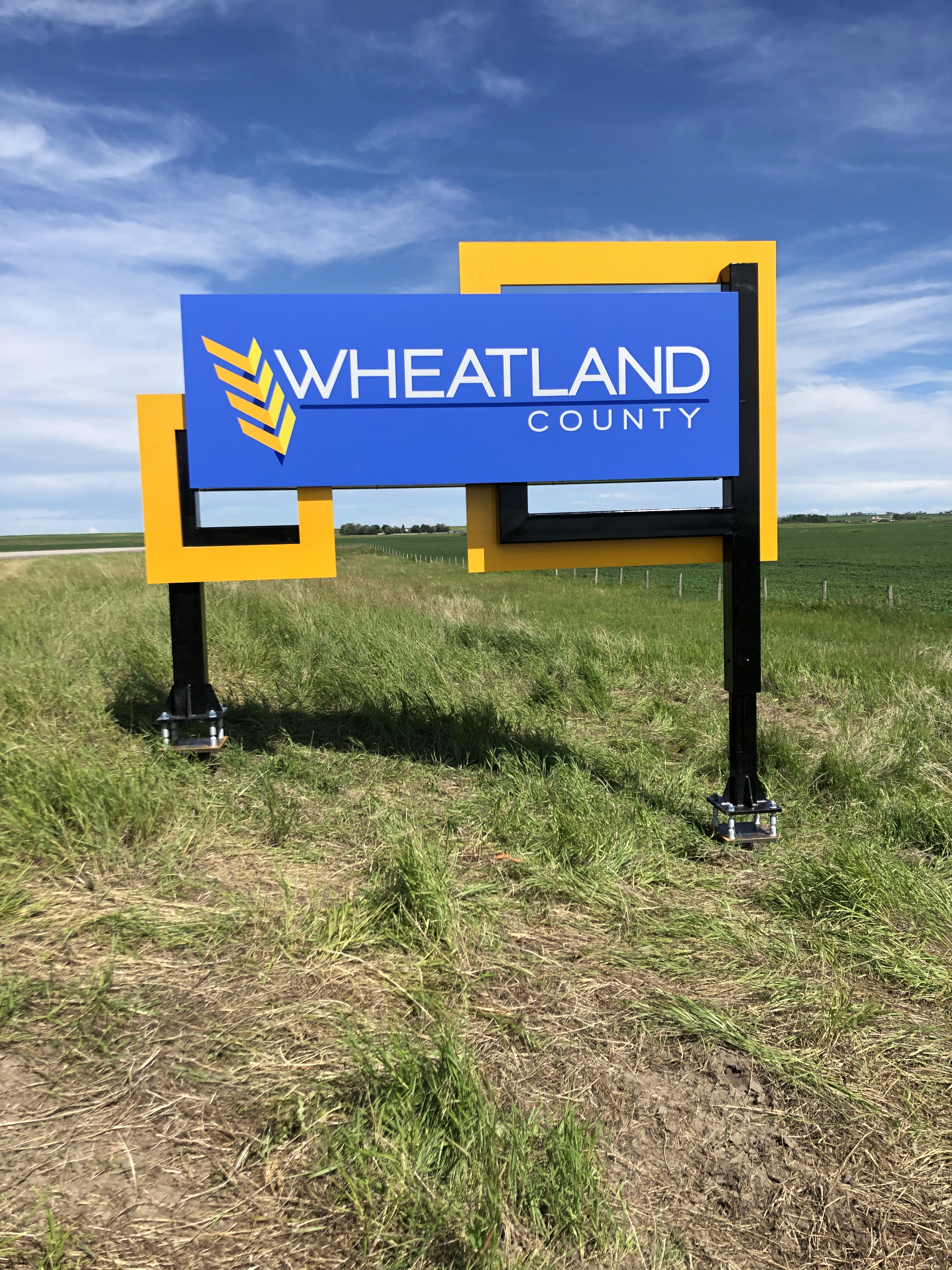

- Location within Alberta
- Coordinates: 51°02′16″N 113°24′01″W
- Country: Canada
- Province: Alberta
- Region: Southern Alberta
- Census division: 5
- Administrative office: 242006 Range Road 243
- Established: 1955
- Incorporated: 1961 (County)

Government
  - Reeve: Amber Link
  - Governing body: Wheatland County Council List: Div. 1 Shannon Laprise; Div. 2 Amber Link; Div. 3 Donna Biggar; Div. 4 Tom Ikert; Div. 5 Scott Klassen; Div. 6 Glenn Koester; Div. 7 Rick Laursen
  - CAO: Brian Henderson
  - MP: David Bexte (Bow River)
  - MLA: List: Chantelle de Jonge (Chestermere-Strathmore); Joseph Schow (Cardston-Siksika); Nathan Cooper (Olds-Didsbury-Three Hills)

Area (2021)
  - Land: 4,505.05 km^{2} (1,739.41 sq mi)

Population (2021)
  - Total: 8,738
  - Density: 1.9/km^{2} (4.9/sq mi)
- Time zone: UTC−06:00 (Alberta Time)
- Website: wheatlandcounty.ca

Wheatland County is a municipal district in south-central Alberta, Canada that is east of Calgary. Located in Census Division No. 5, its municipal office is located east of the Town of Strathmore on Highway 1.

== History ==
On January 1, 1955, Improvement District No. 41, part of Improvement District No. 42, part of the Municipal Districts of Bow Valley No. 40, Serviceberry No. 43, and Kneehill No. 48, were merged into one new municipal district to be known as the Municipal District of Wheatland No. 40 for the first time.

The Municipal District of Wheatland No. 40 and the Wheatland School Division No. 40 joined on January 1, 1961, and became known as the County of Wheatland No. 16.

On March 6, 1996, the name was changed from the County of Wheatland No. 16 to the name currently used, Wheatland County.

== Geography ==
=== Communities and localities ===
The following urban municipalities are surrounded by Wheatland County.

Cities

- none

Towns

- Strathmore

Villages

- Hussar
- Rockyford
- Standard

Summer villages

- none

The following hamlets are located within Wheatland County.

Hamlets

- Ardenode
- Carseland
- Chancellor
- Cheadle
- Cluny
- Dalum
- Gleichen
- Lyalta
- Namaka
- Nightingale
- Redland
- Rosebud

The following localities are located within Wheatland County.

Localities

- Baintree
- Bartstow
- Caruso
- Crowfoot
- Dunshalt
- Eagle Lake
- Gayford
- Grierson
- Grieseach
- Hamlet
- Hawick
- Makepeace
- Phidias
- Rosebud Creek
- Stobart
- Strangmuir
- Towers
- Tudor

The following Hutterite colonies are located within Wheatland County.

- Hillview Colony
- Hutterian Brethren Colony
- Mountain View Colony
- Rideland Colony
- Rosebud Colony
- Springvale Colony
- Stahlville Colony
- Standard Colony
- Sunshine Colony
- Twin Creek Colony
- Wheatland Colony
- Wintering Hills Colony

== Demographics ==
In the 2021 Census of Population conducted by Statistics Canada, Wheatland County had a population of 8,738 living in 2,842 of its 3,108 total private dwellings. With a land area of 4,505.05 km^{2} (1,739.41 sq mi), it had a population density of 1.9/km^{2} (5.0/sq mi) in 2021.

Attractions After the sod turning in 2016, the Strathmore Motor Products Sports Centre opened its doors to the public on February 23, 2019. The unique partnership between Golden Hills School Division #75, the Town of Strathmore, and Wheatland County made the project possible. The facility will serve as a regional recreational centre for visitors and residents of Strathmore and Wheatland County. The facility offers an indoor space to play soccer, lacrosse, basketball, volleyball, badminton, pickleball, and walking/running on the indoor track.

The Hamlet of Rosebud is home to the Rosebud Theatre and School of the Arts (Alberta's only professional rural theatre) and regular performances are held. Rosebud is also home to the annual Chamber Music Festival, several art galleries, gift shops and the county's only public museum, Rosebud Centennial Museum.

Wheatland County has three golf courses. The Oxbow Country Golf Course is a 9-hole course, while Speargrass Golf Course and Muirfield Lakes Golf Club are 18-hole courses.

Community Halls within Wheatland County: Carseland Community Hall | Crowfoot Community Centre | Cheadle Hall Dalum Community Hall | Gleichen & District Community Hall Hussar Community Hall | Lyalta Community Centre and Recreation Facility | Namaka Community Hall | Nightingale Hall Strathmore Centennial Civic Centre | Rosebud Memorial Hall | Rockyford Community Hall | Standard Community Hall |

== Education ==
Wheatland County is part of the Golden Hills School Division.

There are two schools within Wheatland County boundaries: Carseland School (elementary), and Wheatland Crossing School (K-12).

Carseland School is one of the oldest schools in the region. It was originally built in 1930 then rebuilt in 1993. It serves the hamlet of approximately 700 people as well as the surrounding rural area.

The Wheatland Crossing School is located in rural Wheatland County and serves students living in Rockyford, Rosebud, Standard, Cluny, Gleichen, Hussar, and east Wheatland. The official grand opening for Wheatland Crossing took place on September 26, 2017.

Located in Strathmore, Alberta, there are additional schools belonging to the Golden Hills School Division. There are three elementary schools (Wheatland, Westmount, and Brentwood), one junior high school (Crowther Memorial Junior High School), and one high school (Strathmore High School). In 2018, a new regional K-12 school (George Freeman) opened and will be serving Strathmore and rural Wheatland County students.

Christ the Redeemer Catholic School Division also provides education services to the region with a K-6 School (Sacred Heart Academy) and grade 7 to 12 school (Holy Cross Collegiate) in Strathmore.

In September 2008, Trinity Christian Academy opened at the former Covenant Bible College property in Strathmore. Trinity Christian is a Christian school providing Kindergarten through grade 9 and is publicly funded.

== Economy ==
The economy of Wheatland County is dominated by agriculture and the oil and gas industry.

There are two industrial areas in the county. The Origin Business Park is a light/medium industrial area on Highway 1 near the Rocky View County border. The Goldfinch Industrial ASP area has a heavy industrial cluster. Goldfinch is located off Highway 24 near the Hamlet of Carseland and is served by Canadian Pacific Kansas City. Companies such as Nutrien, Orica, Stella Jones, Federated Coop Ltd, and Richardson Pioneer have plants in the area.

Wheatland County also has a developing renewable energy industry with several solar and wind projects and a gas-to-liquids upgrading facility. The county is actively pursuing opportunities in the hydrogen space and has hired a specialist to develop a strategy and engage industry.

In July 2022, CGC Inc., announced plans to invest $210 million to construct a wallboard plant in the Goldfinch area of the county.

In August 2022, De Havilland Canada (DHC) had to decommission its Downsview, Toronto, manufacturing facility, as the underlying land had been sold for redevelopment. Previous plans to build new facilities in Calgary had fallen through, and in September 2022, DHC announced that it would construct a new aircraft production facility, De Havilland Field, in Wheatland County. The announcement stated that the investment would eventually create 1,500 jobs. In August 2023, the regulatory approval process was still underway, and DHC updated its plans to say that it would restart production of its primary product, the Dash 8 Q400, in Wheatland County by no later than 2033. On 15 May 2025, De Havilland Canada conducted a groundbreaking ceremony on the field, which was attended by company leaders as well as representatives from the Government of Canada and the Government of Alberta. The field is located within the county 11 miles west of the town of Strathmore.

The Infinite WC is the economic development brand for Wheatland County.

== See also ==
- List of communities in Alberta
- List of municipal districts in Alberta
