= Rockyford, Alberta =

Rockyford
- Village
- Village of Rockyford
- Location of Rockyford
- Coordinates: 51°14′2″N 113°08′18″W
- Country: Canada
- Province: Alberta
- Region: Southern Alberta
- Census Division: No. 5
- Municipal district: Wheatland County
- Incorporated
  - Village: March 28, 1919

Government
  - Mayor: Brendan Roncin
  - Governing body: Rockyford Village Council

Area (2021)
  - Land: 1.04 km^{2} (0.40 sq mi)
- Elevation: 850 m (2,790 ft)

Population (2021)
  - Total: 395
  - Density: 380.7/km^{2} (986/sq mi)
- Time zone: UTC−06:00 (Alberta Time)
- Highways: 21
- Waterways: Serviceberry Creek
- Website: www.rockyford.ca

Rockyford is a village in southern Alberta, Canada. It is approximately 88 km (55 mi) east of Calgary and 56 km (35 mi) southwest of Drumheller. It was founded in 1913 upon the arrival of the Canadian National Railway.

== Demographics ==
In the 2021 Census of Population conducted by Statistics Canada, the Village of Rockyford had a population of 395 living in 144 of its 154 total private dwellings, a change of 25% from its 2016 population of 316. With a land area of 1.04 km^{2} (0.40 sq mi), it had a population density of 379.8/km^{2} (983.7/sq mi) in 2021.

In the 2016 Census of Population conducted by Statistics Canada, the Village of Rockyford recorded a population of 316 living in 144 of its 151 total private dwellings, a −2.8% change from its 2011 population of 325. With a land area of 1.08 km^{2} (0.42 sq mi), it had a population density of 292.6/km^{2} (757.8/sq mi) in 2016.

== See also ==
- List of communities in Alberta
- List of villages in Alberta
