= Hussar, Alberta =

Hussar
- Village
- Village of Hussar
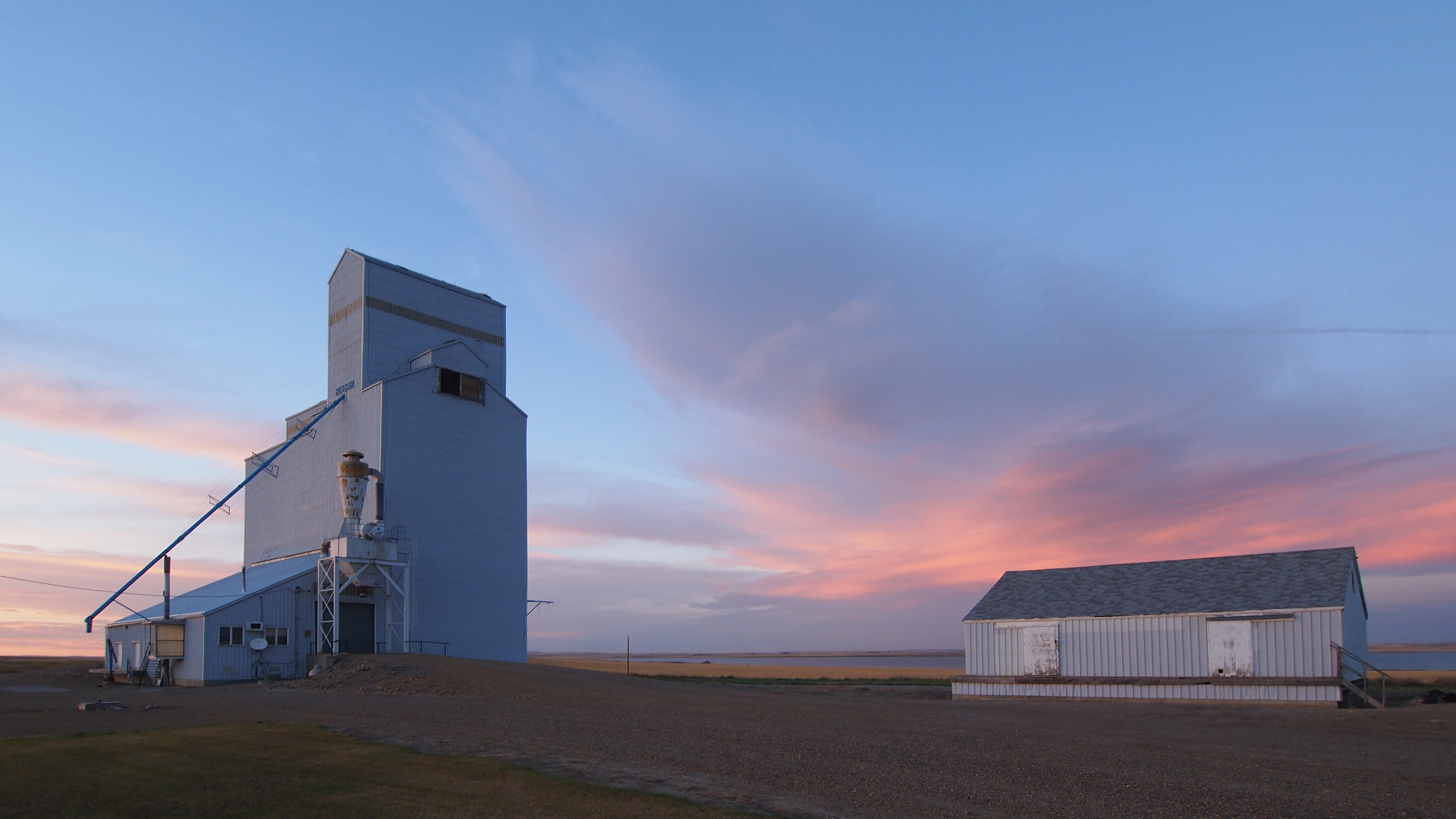
- Hussar Grain Elevator

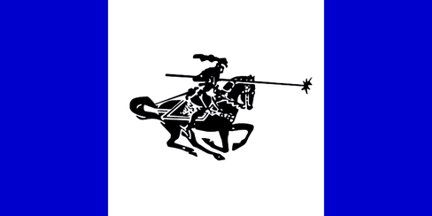
- Flag

- Location within Alberta
- Coordinates: 51°02′31″N 112°40′59″W
- Country: Canada
- Province: Alberta
- Region: Southern Alberta
- Census Division: No. 5
- Municipal district: Wheatland County
- Founded: 1913
- Incorporated
  - Village: April 20, 1928

Government
  - Mayor: Les Schultz
  - Governing body: Hussar Village Council
  - Deputy Mayor: Coralee Schindel
  - Councillor: Tim Frank

Area (2021)
  - Land: 0.7 km^{2} (0.27 sq mi)
- Elevation: 910 m (2,990 ft)

Population (2021)
  - Total: 164
  - Density: 235.2/km^{2} (609/sq mi)
- Time zone: UTC−06:00 (Alberta Time)
- Postal Code: T0J 1S0
- Area code: 403
- Highways: 56, 561
- Website: www.villageofhussar.ca

Hussar is a village in southern Alberta, Canada within Wheatland County. It is located on Highway 561, approximately 93 km (58 mi) east of Calgary and 55 km (34 mi) south of Drumheller.

== History ==
Hussar was unofficially founded in 1913 when the Canadian Pacific Railway (CPR) established a station and named it Hussar. A community grew up around the station and was incorporated as a village in 1928. The name Hussar for the station was used in honour of a group of German soldiers who belonged to a German Hussar (cavalry) regiment who earlier had established a large farm near the village. With the start of World War I most of the soldiers returned to Germany and those who remained were interned for the duration of the war. The land, which was part of this German Canadian Farming Co. Ltd., was purchased after the war. Following the war, the community, both the village and the surrounding area, began to grow with an influx of settlers from around the world. English, Irish, Scots and Danes made up the bulk of the settlers. Many of those settlers' descendants still reside in or around the community.

== Demographics ==
In the 2021 Census of Population conducted by Statistics Canada, the Village of Hussar had a population of 164 living in 74 of its 85 total private dwellings, a change of −13.7% from its 2016 population of 190. With a land area of 0.7 km^{2} (0.27 sq mi), it had a population density of 234.3/km^{2} (606.8/sq mi) in 2021.

In the 2016 Census of Population conducted by Statistics Canada, the Village of Hussar recorded a population of 190 living in 78 of its 87 total private dwellings, a change of 8% from its 2011 population of 176. With a land area of 0.75 km^{2} (0.29 sq mi), it had a population density of 253.3/km^{2} (656.1/sq mi) in 2016.

== See also ==
- List of communities in Alberta
- List of villages in Alberta
