= Delia, Alberta =

Delia Highland (1914–1915)
- Village
- Village of Delia
- Location within Alberta
- Coordinates: 51°38′N 112°22′W
- Country: Canada
- Province: Alberta
- Region: Southern Alberta
- Census division: 5
- Municipal district: Starland County
- Incorporated
  - Village: July 20, 1914 (as Highland)
  - Name change: December 9, 1915

Government
  - Mayor: Thomas Trout
  - Governing body: Delia Village Council

Area (2021)
  - Land: 1.33 km^{2} (0.51 sq mi)
- Elevation: 910 m (2,990 ft)

Population (2021)
  - Total: 152
  - Density: 114.4/km^{2} (296/sq mi)
- Time zone: UTC−06:00 (Alberta Time)
- Highways: Highway 9 Highway 851
- Website: Official website

Delia is a village in southern Alberta, Canada. It is approximately 45 km (28 mi) northeast of Drumheller, 1.6 km (0.99 mi) south of Highway 9. It is named for Delia Davis, wife of Alvin L. Davis, a local merchant, and was originally known as the Village of Highland between 1914 and 1915, though the post office was called Delia from its inception in 1912.

In 1920, Delia became the first community in Alberta to be governed by a female reeve, Violet Barss. She was selected and appointed internally by her colleagues on the village council, not directly elected to the position by the voters.

== Demographics ==
In the 2021 Census of Population conducted by Statistics Canada, the Village of Delia had a population of 152 living in 76 of its 96 total private dwellings, a change of −29.6% from its 2016 population of 216. With a land area of 1.33 km^{2} (0.51 sq mi), it had a population density of 114.3/km^{2} (296.0/sq mi) in 2021.

In the 2016 Census of Population conducted by Statistics Canada, the Village of Delia recorded a population of 216 living in 103 of its 115 total private dwellings, a 16.1% change from its 2011 population of 186. With a land area of 1.33 km^{2} (0.51 sq mi), it had a population density of 162.4/km^{2} (420.6/sq mi) in 2016.

== Arts and culture ==
Delia was one of several Canadian filming locations used in the 2001 film Knockaround Guys, starring Barry Pepper, Vin Diesel, John Malkovich and Dennis Hopper.

== Amenities ==
School:

Delia offers a kindergarten to grade 12 school, with approximately 15 educational staff, plus educational assistants, and about 130 students attending. There are many extracurricular athletic and scholastic programs available. Operating under the Prairie Land Regional School Division. CTS trailer available beginning 2009–2010 school year. Video conferencing courses available.

Recreational facilities:

Skating/hockey arena (with winter figure skating program and public skating hours), curling rink (3 sheets of ice, with winter curling programs and bonspiels available), a dance hall and exercise room, municipal library, and 3 baseball diamonds.
Community hall capable of seating 300 people, Village Office, 2 banks, general store, hair salon and massage parlor, book-keeping and clerical services, Delia Agricultural Society, post office, Viterra; agricultural input supplier and grain dealer, historical museum and grist mill, 2 churches (with youth group programs), campground with 8 sites and tenting area, and seniors drop in centre.

Dining:

Mother Mountain Tea House and Gift Shop, Luke's Cafe

== Activities and events ==
Canskate/Figure Skating: During the winter months, from late October or early November until late March or early April, young skaters between the ages of three and a half and eighteen take to the ice to improve their skating skills. Canskaters are taught by the certified starskate coach, as well as her program assistants ("junior coaches"). The really young skaters skate only on Mondays, while the slightly more advanced skaters take lessons on both Mondays and Thursdays. Senior skaters (those that have received at least their level seven badge) skate two to three times a week. Approximately once a month, a dance partner comes from Calgary to partner the girls in their dances, which will be tested.

Junior/Senior High School Curling: Students attending Delia School have the opportunity to join a curling team over the winter.

Events

- Delia and District Annual Fall Fair
- Summer Ball Tournament
- 4-H Beef Show and Sale
- Delia on Display
- Annual Handhills Rodeo
- Various musical and other presentations
- Delia Skating Club Annual Carniva

== See also ==
- List of communities in Alberta
- List of villages in Alberta
