= Crowfoot, Alberta =

Coordinates: 50.81682°N 112.65186°W

Crowfoot is a locality in Alberta, Canada.

The community has the name of Crowfoot, an Indian chief.
