= Strathmore, Alberta =

Strathmore
- Town
- Town of Strathmore
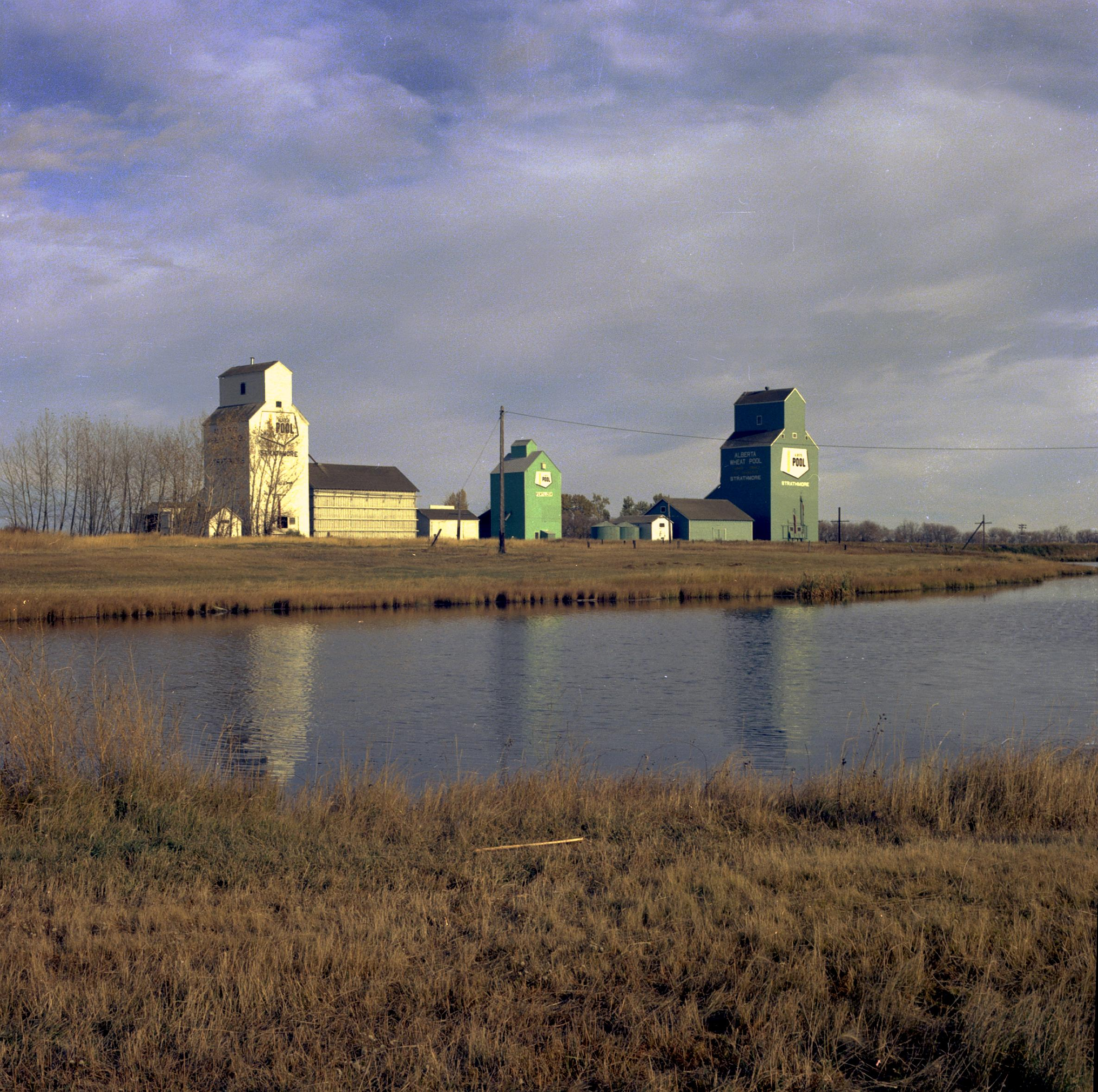
- Grain elevators, 1974

- Flag
- Motto: Where Quality of Life is a Way of Life
- Location within Alberta
- Coordinates: 51°02′16″N 113°24′01″W
- Country: Canada
- Province: Alberta
- Region: Calgary Region
- Census division: 5
- Municipal district: Wheatland County
- Founded: 1883
- Incorporated
  - Village: March 20, 1908
  - Town: July 6, 1911
- Named for: Claude Bowes-Lyon, 13th Earl of Strathmore and Kinghorne

Government
  - Mayor: Pat Fule
  - Governing body: Strathmore Town Council: Melissa Langmaid; Debbie Mitzner; Jason Montgomery; Denise Peterson; Richard Wegener; Brent Wiley
  - CAO: Kevin Scoble
  - MP: David Bexte (Bow River)
  - MLA: Chantelle de Jonge (Chestermere-Strathmore)

Area (2021)
  - Land: 26.98 km^{2} (10.42 sq mi)
- Elevation: 973 m (3,192 ft)

Population (2021)
  - Total: 14,339
  - Density: 531.5/km^{2} (1,377/sq mi)
  - Municipal census (2015): 13,327
  - Estimate (2020): 14,645
- Time zone: UTC−06:00 (Alberta Time)
- Postal code range: T1P
- Area codes: 403, 587, 825, 368
- Highways: Highway 1 / Highway 817
- Waterways: Eagle Lake
- Website: www.strathmore.ca

Strathmore is a town in southern Alberta, Canada. Surrounded by Wheatland County, it is along the Trans-Canada Highway about 50 kilometres (30 mi) east of Calgary.

== History ==
The town began as a hamlet for the Canadian Pacific Railway (CPR) lines that were built in the area in 1883. The CPR named the town after one of its benefactors: Claude Bowes-Lyon, the Earl of Strathmore. The Earl's granddaughter, Queen Elizabeth – as consort to King George VI – later passed through the community on the "Royal Train" in late May 1939.

A track-laying record was made between Strathmore and Cheadle when the railway was built. In one hour one mile (1.6 km) of steel was laid and – at the end of the ten-hour working day – the rails were laid to Cheadle, 9 miles (14 km) for a record. The passing of the Canadian government's Dominion Lands Act in 1872, encouraging settlement, led to increases in Strathmore's population and its importance as a rail supply stop.

Strathmore's first school opened in 1908. The CPR railway tracks are now gone, the land having been subdivided.

In 2011, the Town of Strathmore celebrated its centennial – and released the book 100 Years of Memories: Celebrating Strathmore's Centennial through Polished Publishing Group in early 2012.

== Demographics ==
Federal census population history
Year	Pop.	±%
1911	531	—
1916	551	+3.8%
1921	584	+6.0%
1926	540	−7.5%
1931	523	−3.1%
1936	531	+1.5%
1941	560	+5.5%
1946	603	+7.7%
1951	704	+16.7%
1956	727	+3.3%
1961	924	+27.1%
1966	994	+7.6%
1971	1,148	+15.5%
1976	1,561	+36.0%
1981	2,986	+91.3%
1986	3,544	+18.7%
1991	4,185	+18.1%
1996	5,282	+26.2%
2001	7,621	+44.3%
2006	10,225	+34.2%
2011	12,305	+20.3%
2016	13,756	+11.8%
2021	14,339	+4.2%
Source: Statistics Canada

In the 2021 Census of Population conducted by Statistics Canada, the Town of Strathmore had a population of 14,339 living in 5,517 of its 5,754 total private dwellings, a change of 4.2% from its 2016 population of 13,756. With a land area of 26.98 km^{2} (10.42 sq mi), it had a population density of 531.5/km^{2} (1,376.5/sq mi) in 2021.

In the 2016 Census of Population conducted by Statistics Canada, the Town of Strathmore recorded a population of 13,756 living in 5,148 of its 5,358 total private dwellings, a change of 11.8% from its 2011 population of 12,305. With a land area of 27.4 km^{2} (10.6 sq mi), it had a population density of 502.0/km^{2} (1,300.3/sq mi) in 2016.

The Town of Strathmore's 2015 municipal census counted a population of 13,327, a change of 7.9% from its 2012 municipal census population of 12,352.

Panethnic groups in the Town of Strathmore (2001−2021)
Panethnic group	2021		2016		2011		2006		2001	
Panethnic group	Pop.	%	Pop.	%	Pop.	%	Pop.	%	Pop.	%
European (Note: Statistic includes all persons that did not make up part of a visible minority or an indigenous identity.)	12,055	85.44%	11,695	87.34%	11,205	92.11%	9,315	92.36%	7,160	95.59%
Indigenous	925	6.56%	805	6.01%	475	3.9%	355	3.52%	220	2.94%
Southeast Asian (Note: Statistic includes total responses of "Filipino" and "Southeast Asian" under visible minority section on census.)	465	3.3%	375	2.8%	220	1.81%	105	1.04%	20	0.27%
African	170	1.2%	155	1.16%	90	0.74%	50	0.5%	40	0.53%
South Asian	170	1.2%	105	0.78%	40	0.33%	45	0.45%	0	0%
East Asian (Note: Statistic includes total responses of "Chinese", "Korean", and "Japanese" under visible minority section on census.)	155	1.1%	160	1.19%	55	0.45%	90	0.89%	20	0.27%
Latin American	75	0.53%	35	0.26%	35	0.29%	50	0.5%	20	0.27%
Middle Eastern (Note: Statistic includes total responses of "West Asian" and "Arab" under visible minority section on census.)	25	0.18%	40	0.3%	0	0%	70	0.69%	0	0%
Other/multiracial (Note: Statistic includes total responses of "Visible minority, n.i.e." and "Multiple visible minorities" under visible minority section on census.)	70	0.5%	35	0.26%	30	0.25%	10	0.1%	25	0.33%
Total responses	14,110	98.4%	13,390	97.34%	12,165	98.86%	10,085	98.63%	7,490	98.28%
Total population	14,339	100%	13,756	100%	12,305	100%	10,225	100%	7,621	100%
Note: Totals greater than 100% due to multiple origin responses

== Economy ==
Today, the town is an important agricultural community. Oil and gas exploration is also a growing interest in the area. It is the headquarters of Golden Hills School Division No. 75.

Many residents commute daily from Strathmore to Calgary. In the 21st century, the town has seen a major growth in commercial development, with many franchise restaurants and a few big-box chain stores opening in the community.

== Transportation ==
Strathmore has no public transit system, but people without their own vehicles can opt to use a local taxi or a Strathmore Handi-Bus for residents with mobility issues to travel on-demand. Initially administered by the Town of Strathmore, the Handi-Bus program was transferred to the non-profit charity Strathmore Handibus Association.

== Sports ==
Strathmore was the home of the Strathmore Rockies, a team in the WWHL. It is currently home to the Strathmore Wheatland Kings of the Heritage Junior "B" league; as well as the former home of the UFA Bisons of the AMHL, who have helped produce NHL players Peyton Krebs, Zach Boychuk, and Mason Raymond among others.

The Strathmore Spartans football team has alumni players throughout the CJFL, Canadian University system and the CFL.

The Strathmore Venom Junior "B" lacrosse team won the provincial title in 2010 for the first time since the team was founded in 2004.

Strathmore was one of the hosts for the 2013 Tour of Alberta Pro Cycling Festival.

Every year Strathmore holds its Heritage Days celebrations, which include the Strathmore Stampede, Canada's third largest rodeo.

== Education ==
Strathmore is part of the Golden Hills School Division.

Strathmore has three elementary schools (Wheatland, Westmount and Brentwood), two Kindergarten to grade 9 schools (George Freeman School and Trinity Christian Academy), one junior high school (Crowther Memorial Junior High School), two high schools (Strathmore High School and Strathmore Storefront School) and a Catholic School providing Kindergarten through grade 6 (Sacred Heart Academy) as well as a grade 7 to 12 Catholic school (Holy Cross Collegiate).

Strathmore was the home of Covenant Bible College Canada. The CBC-C campus relocated in 1995 from its prior home in Prince Albert, Saskatchewan. In Covenant Bible College, students took a course in religious studies. It was closed in 2007 due to dropping student enrollment and other fiscal problems. The former CBC campus was sold for $5.5 million to another Christian organization, EnCharis.

In September 2008, Trinity Christian Academy opened at the former Covenant Bible College property. Trinity Christian is a Christian school providing Kindergarten through grade 9 and is publicly funded.

== See also ==
- List of communities in Alberta
- List of towns in Alberta
