= Standard, Alberta =

Standard
- Village
- Village of Standard
- Location of Standard in Alberta
- Coordinates: 51°06′38.4″N 112°58′54.7″W
- Country: Canada
- Province: Alberta
- Region: Southern Alberta
- Census division: 5
- Municipal district: Wheatland County
- Incorporated
  - Village: April 29, 1922

Government
  - Mayor: Martin Gauthier
  - Governing body: Standard Village Council

Area (2021)
  - Land: 2.34 km^{2} (0.90 sq mi)
- Elevation: 900 m (3,000 ft)

Population (2021)
  - Total: 353
  - Density: 150.9/km^{2} (391/sq mi)
- Time zone: UTC−06:00 (Alberta Time)
- Postal Code: T0J
- Area codes: 403 (1947), 587 (2008), 825 (2016), 368 (2022)
- Highways: Highway 840
- Waterways: Parflesh Creek
- Website: www.villageofstandard.ca

Standard is a village in southern Alberta, Canada. It is surrounded by Wheatland County, approximately 80 kilometres (50 mi) east of Calgary. The Canadian Pacific Kansas City tracks pass south of the village. The village was originally settled by Danish immigrants. Standard's economy is based on the surrounding farming community and the energy industry, with a number of oil and gas rigs in operation in the vicinity. Chief employers include Agrium Liquid Fertilizer, which operates a manufacturing plant, and the Husky Oil Plant.

== Demographics ==
In the 2021 Census of Population conducted by Statistics Canada, the Village of Standard had a population of 353 living in 151 of its 160 total private dwellings, a change of 0% from its 2016 population of 353. With a land area of 2.34 km^{2} (0.90 sq mi), it had a population density of 150.9/km^{2} (390.7/sq mi) in 2021.

In the 2016 Census of Population conducted by Statistics Canada, the Village of Standard recorded a population of 353 living in 148 of its 150 total private dwellings, a −6.9% change from its 2011 population of 379. With a land area of 2.35 km^{2} (0.91 sq mi), it had a population density of 150.2/km^{2} (389.0/sq mi) in 2016.

== The murder of Kelly Cook ==
Standard is known in Alberta for the tragic abduction and murder of one of its residents, 15-year-old Kelly Cook, in 1981. The Grade 10 student regularly babysat for townsfolk, and on the morning of April 22, 1981, she received a phone call from a man who identified himself as Bill Christensen. He asked her to babysit for him that evening. Although she did not know the caller, she agreed, as 'Christensen' was a common surname in the area and crime was virtually unknown in the village, with residents routinely leaving their doors unlocked. The caller arranged to pick Kelly up that evening and drive her to his residence. At 8:30 that evening, a car pulled up in front of the house where she lived with her parents and siblings. The driver did not leave his car, and Kelly walked out of her house and climbed into the automobile's front passenger seat. The car then immediately drove off. A few hours later, her anxious parents, concerned that Kelly had not called or returned home, called the Royal Canadian Mounted Police. A massive local search was launched but yielded almost no clues. Two months after her abduction, on June 28, her badly decomposed body was discovered by a young man riding his dirt bike in Chin Lakes, an irrigation canal south of the Town of Taber, southeast of her hometown of Standard. The case caught the public's attention like few other murder cases because it was so unusual, with the killer actually picking up his victim at her house while her mother watched through the window. Despite the publicity generated by this murder case, and a $100,000 reward offered by the Village of Standard for information leading to the arrest of Kelly's killer, the case currently remains unsolved.

== See also ==
- List of communities in Alberta
- List of villages in Alberta
