= Glenbow, Alberta =

Locality in Alberta, Canada

Coordinates: 51.15848°N 114.38450°W

Location of Glenbow in Alberta

Glenbow is a locality in southern Alberta, in Rocky View County located northwest of the City of Calgary and east of the Town of Cochrane on Highway 1A. It is now part of the Glenbow Ranch Provincial Park. The Glenbow area is immediately west of Rocky View County's Bearspaw area.

The name Glenbow is descriptive and refers to its location: it lies 'in a glen on the Bow' (Bow River). The name is a portmanteau. A Canadian Pacific Railway station was established at Glenbow in 1907. The post office operated from September 1, 1908 to October 15, 1920.

Glenbow was well known for its sandstone quarry that supplied building material for Calgary's early commercial and institutional developments. The Glenbow Museum in Calgary is named after this area.
