= Lynx Ridge, Calgary =

Lynx Ridge
- Subdivision
- Location of Lynx Ridge in Calgary
- Coordinates: 51°07′02″N 114°15′44″W
- Country: Canada
- Province: Alberta
- City: Calgary
- Quadrant: NW
- Ward: 1
- Established: early 2000s
- Annexed: 2005

Government
  - Mayor: Jeromy Farkas
  - Administrative body: Calgary City Council
  - Councillor: Kim Tyers (Communities First)
- Website: Lynx Ridge Estates

Lynx Ridge is a residential subdivision in the northwest quadrant of Calgary, Alberta. It is located at the extreme western edge of the city, bordered on the east by Twelve Mile Coulee Road and to the south by the Bow River. Its northern and western boundaries are the city limits and rural residential development within the area of Bearspaw. The subdivision covers 88 hectares and the Lynx Ridge Golf Club winds its way through the neighbourhood. The subdivision was established in the Municipal District of Rocky View in the late-1990s/early-2000s, and was annexed into the City of Calgary on January 1, 2005.

It is represented in the Calgary City Council by Ward 1 councillor.

== Infrastructure ==
Save for the golf course, there is no commercial hub in Lynx Ridge, with the closest commercial services in Rocky Ridge and Tuscany. The area is not presently served by Calgary Transit, nor has space been set aside for schools, due to its small size. The golf course provides most of the subdivision's green space.

== See also ==
- List of neighbourhoods in Calgary
