= Airdrie-Cochrane =

Airdrie-Cochrane may refer to:

- Airdrie-Cochrane (provincial electoral district)
- Airdrie—Cochrane (federal electoral district)
