= Artists View Park West, Alberta =

Artists View Park West
- Designated place
- Location of Artists View Park West Artists View Park West (Canada)
- Coordinates: 51.078°N 114.267°W
- Country: Canada
- Province: Alberta
- Region: Calgary Metropolitan Region
- Census division: 6
- Municipal district: Rocky View County

Government
  - Type: Unincorporated
  - Governing body: Rocky View County Council

Area (2021)
  - Land: 1.33 km^{2} (0.51 sq mi)

Population (2021)
  - Total: 205
  - Density: 153.9/km^{2} (399/sq mi)
- Time zone: UTC−06:00 (Alberta Time)
- Area codes: 403, 587, 825

Artists View Park West is an unincorporated community in Alberta, Canada within Rocky View County that is recognized as a designated place by Statistics Canada. It is located on the north side of Highway 563 (Old Banff Coach Road), 0.8 km (0.50 mi) south of Highway 1. It is adjacent to the City of Calgary to the west.

== Demographics ==
In the 2021 Census of Population conducted by Statistics Canada, Artists View Park West had a population of 205 living in 72 of its 73 total private dwellings, a change of −6.4% from its 2016 population of 219. With a land area of 1.33 km^{2} (0.51 sq mi), it had a population density of 154.1/km^{2} (399.2/sq mi) in 2021.

As a designated place in the 2016 Census of Population conducted by Statistics Canada, Artists View Park West had a population of 98 living in 32 of its 32 total private dwellings, a change of 27.3% from its 2011 population of 77. With a land area of 0.48 km^{2} (0.19 sq mi), it had a population density of 204.2/km^{2} (528.8/sq mi) in 2016.

== See also ==
- List of communities in Alberta
- List of designated places in Alberta
- List of designated places in Alberta
