= ACVA =

ACVA may refer to:

- In medicine, Acute Cerebrovascular Accident (stroke)
- Bavarian Auto Group § Al Fotouh Company for Vehicle Assembly
- Canadian House of Commons Standing Committee on Veterans Affairs (official acronym ACVA)
- ACV Auctions
