= Partridge Place, Alberta =

Partridge Place, Alberta may refer to:

- Partridge Place, Rocky View County, Alberta, a locality in Rocky View County, Alberta
- Partridge Place, Parkland County, Alberta, a locality in Parkland County, Alberta
