= Heritage Woods, Alberta =

Heritage Woods
- Designated place
- Location of Heritage Woods Heritage Woods (Canada)
- Coordinates: 51.054°N 114.240°W
- Country: Canada
- Province: Alberta
- Region: Calgary Metropolitan Region
- Census division: 6
- Municipal district: Rocky View County

Government
  - Type: Unincorporated
  - Governing body: Rocky View County Council

Area (2021)
  - Land: 0.39 km^{2} (0.15 sq mi)

Population (2021)
  - Total: 99
  - Density: 254.5/km^{2} (659/sq mi)
- Time zone: UTC−06:00 (Alberta Time)
- Area codes: 403, 587, 825

Heritage Woods is an unincorporated community in Alberta, Canada within Rocky View County that is recognized as a designated place by Statistics Canada. It is located on the west side of 101 St SW, 1.4 km (0.87 mi) south of Highway 563. It is adjacent to the City of Calgary to the east.

== Demographics ==
In the 2021 Census of Population conducted by Statistics Canada, Heritage Woods had a population of 99 living in 33 of its 36 total private dwellings, a change of −11.6% from its 2016 population of 112. With a land area of 0.39 km^{2} (0.15 sq mi), it had a population density of 253.8/km^{2} (657.5/sq mi) in 2021.

As a designated place in the 2016 Census of Population conducted by Statistics Canada, Heritage Woods had a population of 112 living in 35 of its 35 total private dwellings, a change of 8.7% from its 2011 population of 103. With a land area of 0.39 km^{2} (0.15 sq mi), it had a population density of 287.2/km^{2} (743.8/sq mi) in 2016.

== See also ==
- List of communities in Alberta
- List of designated places in Alberta
