= Louise Feltham =

Canadian politician (1935–2020)

Member of Parliament for Wild Rose
- In office 1988–1993
- Preceded by: riding created
- Succeeded by: Myron Thompson

Personal details
- Born: 22 March 1935 Gull Island, Newfoundland
- Died: 25 May 2020 (aged 85) Calgary, Alberta, Canada
- Party: Progressive Conservative
- Spouse: Douglas Feltham
- Children: 3
- Profession: businessperson

Charlotte Beatrice Louise Feltham (22 March 1935 – 25 May 2020) was a member of the House of Commons of Canada from 1988 to 1993. She was a businessperson by career.

Feltham began her political career by serving as councillor and reeve of Rocky View County from 1974 until 1988. She was elected in the 1988 federal election at the new electoral district of Wild Rose for the Progressive Conservative Party. She served in the 34th Canadian Parliament but lost to Myron Thompson of the Reform Party in the 1993 federal election. She died in Calgary on 25 May 2020.
