= Tuscany, Calgary =

Tuscany
- Community
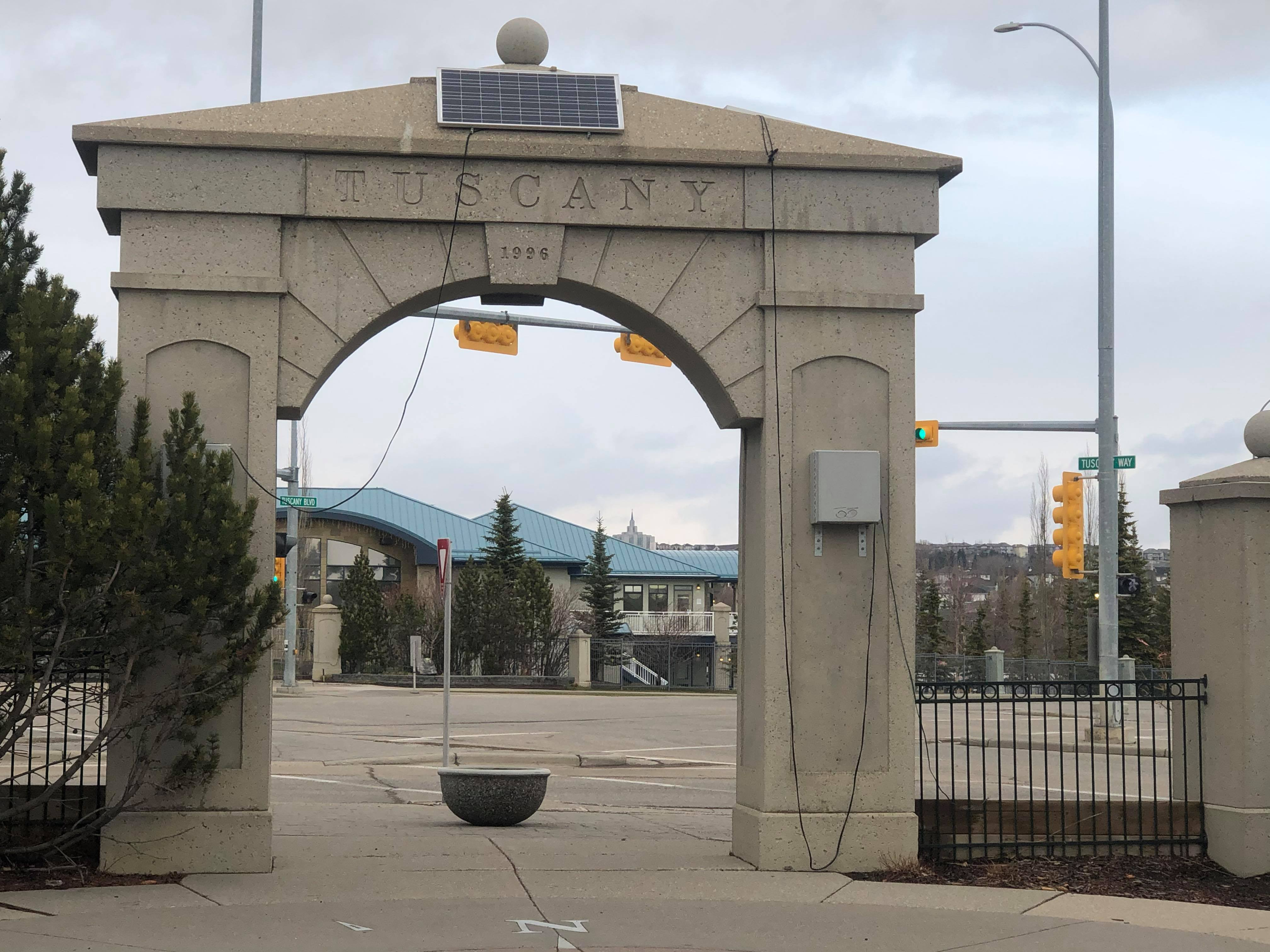

- Location of Tuscany in Calgary
- Coordinates: 51°07′26″N 114°14′47″W
- Country: Canada
- Province: Alberta
- City: Calgary
- Quadrant: NW
- Ward: 1
- Established: 1994

Government
  - Mayor: Jeromy Farkas
  - Administrative body: Calgary City Council
  - Councillor: Kim Tyers (Communities First)
- Elevation: 1,180 m (3,870 ft)

Population (2019)
  - Total: 19,884
  - Density: 2,798/km^{2} (7,250/sq mi)
- Area code: 403
- Website: Tuscany Community Association

Tuscany is a residential community in the northwest quadrant of Calgary, Alberta. It is located at the western edge of the city, and is bounded to the north by Crowchild Trail, to the east by Stoney Trail, Nose Hill Drive and the Two Toed Pond to the south and Twelve Mile Coulee Road and the recently annexed community of Lynx Ridge and the rural acreages of Bearspaw to the west.

Tuscany was established in 1994 and it was named for the region of Tuscany, Italy. It is represented in the Calgary City Council by the Ward 1 councillor.

== Demographics ==
In the City of Calgary's 2019 municipal census, Tuscany had a population of 19,884 living in 6,672 dwellings, a 0.8% increase from its 2018 population of 19,723. With a land area of 6.9 km^{2} (2.7 sq mi), it had a population density of 2,798/km^{2} (7,250/sq mi) in 2013.

Residents in this community had a median household income of $92,453 in 2005, and there were 7.1% low income residents living in the neighbourhood. As of 2006, 18.5% of the residents were immigrants. A proportion of 7.6% of the buildings were condominiums or apartments, and 2.7% of the housing was used for renting.

== Education ==
This neighbourhood has two public elementary schools, Tuscany Elementary School (K-4) and Eric Harvie School (K-4), as well as a public middle school, Twelve Mile Coulee School (6 -9). There is also a Catholic school, St. Basil (K-9).

== See also ==
- List of neighbourhoods in Calgary
