= Banff—Airdrie =

Defunct federal electoral district in Alberta, Canada

Alberta electoral district
- Banff–Airdrie in relation to other Alberta federal electoral districts as of the 2013 Representation Order.

Defunct federal electoral district
- Legislature: House of Commons
- District created: 2013
- District abolished: 2023
- First contested: 2015
- Last contested: 2021
- District webpage: profile, map

Demographics
- Population (2016): 135,762
- Electors (2019): 107,281
- Area (km²): 12,358.29
- Census division(s): Division No. 6, Division No. 15
- Census subdivision(s): Airdrie, Banff, Canmore, Cochrane, Crossfield, Rocky View, Stoney 142, 143, 144

Banff—Airdrie was a federal electoral district in Alberta, Canada, that was represented in the House of Commons of Canada from 2015 to 2025.

Banff—Airdrie was created by the 2012 federal electoral boundaries redistribution. It came into effect upon the call of the 42nd Canadian federal election. The riding was created out of parts of Wild Rose (98%) and Macleod (2%) electoral districts.

Following the 2022 Canadian federal electoral redistribution, it was abolished at the 2025 Canadian federal election, with the riding being split between Airdrie—Cochrane, Bow River, and Yellowhead.

== Demographics ==
Panethnic groups in Banff—Airdrie (2011−2021)
Panethnic group	2021		2016		2011	
Panethnic group	Pop.	%	Pop.	%	Pop.	%
European (Note: Statistic includes all persons that did not make up part of a visible minority or an indigenous identity.)	120,715	79.57%	109,295	82.74%	87,100	85.24%
Indigenous	6,625	4.37%	8,630	6.53%	6,690	6.55%
South Asian	6,120	4.03%	3,295	2.49%	1,635	1.6%
Southeast Asian (Note: Statistic includes total responses of "Filipino" and "Southeast Asian" under visible minority section on census.)	5,695	3.75%	3,400	2.57%	2,065	2.02%
African	4,220	2.78%	2,165	1.64%	970	0.95%
East Asian (Note: Statistic includes total responses of "Chinese", "Korean", and "Japanese" under visible minority section on census.)	3,530	2.33%	2,740	2.07%	2,380	2.33%
Latin American	2,270	1.5%	1,230	0.93%	745	0.73%
Middle Eastern (Note: Statistic includes total responses of "West Asian" and "Arab" under visible minority section on census.)	1,280	0.84%	560	0.42%	290	0.28%
Other/Multiracial (Note: Statistic includes total responses of "Visible minority, n.i.e." and "Multiple visible minorities" under visible minority section on census.)	1,260	0.83%	770	0.58%	320	0.31%
Total responses	151,710	97.51%	132,090	97.3%	102,185	96.91%
Total population	155,580	100%	135,762	100%	105,442	100%
Notes: Totals greater than 100% due to multiple origin responses. Demographics based on 2012 Canadian federal electoral redistribution riding boundaries.

== Geography ==
The riding contains the northern and western exurbs of Calgary, and runs west along the Bow River valley and includes all of Banff National Park.

== Profile ==
The Conservative base of support is in the east of the riding, where they dominate Airdrie, the riding's largest community, and Cochrane, as well as the communities bordering Calgary. The Liberals, NDP and Greens all perform better in the western regions of the riding. Canmore was solidly Liberal in the 2015 election and Banff broke heavily for the left of centre parties.

== Members of Parliament ==
This riding has elected the following members of the House of Commons of Canada:

Parliament	Years	Member	Party
Banff-Airdrie; Riding created from Wild Rose and Macleod
42nd	2015–2019	Blake Richards	Conservative
43rd	2019–2021	Blake Richards	Conservative
44th	2021–2025	Blake Richards	Conservative
Riding dissolved into Airdrie—Cochrane, Bow River, and Yellowhead

== Election results ==
Graph of election results in Banff—Airdrie (minor parties that never got 1% of the vote or didn't run consistently are omitted)

2021 Canadian federal election
Party	Candidate	Votes	%	±%	Expenditures
Conservative	Blake Richards	43,677	56.73	–14.36	$82,283.53
New Democratic	Sarah Zagoda	12,482	16.21	+5.73	$5,649.63
Liberal	David Gamble	9,572	12.43	+1.64	$27,675.24
People's	Nadine Wellwood	5,808	7.54	+4.14	$25,373.84
No Affiliation	Derek Sloan	2,020	2.62	–	$124,282.97
Maverick	Tariq Elnaga	1,475	1.92	–	$17,960.91
Green	Aidan Blum	1,405	1.82	–2.43	none listed
Independent	Caroline O'Driscoll	489	0.64	–	$10,142.91
Independent	Ron Voss	60	0.08	–	none listed
Total valid votes/expense limit		76,988	99.49	–	$141,669.12
Total rejected ballots		396	0.51	+0.01	
Turnout		77,384	68.78	–3.70	
Eligible voters		112,509			
Conservative hold		Swing		–10.05	
Source: Elections Canada

2019 Canadian federal election
Party	Candidate	Votes	%	±%	Expenditures
Conservative	Blake Richards	55,504	71.09	+7.72	$79,955.07
Liberal	Gwyneth Midgley	8,425	10.79	–15.29	$8,319.50
New Democratic	Anne Wilson	8,185	10.48	+3.70	$7,756.53
Green	Austin Mullins	3,315	4.25	+0.48	$824.70
People's	Nadine Wellwood	2,651	3.40	–	$21,834.65
Total valid votes/expense limit		78,080	99.50	–	$134,325.72
Total rejected ballots		393	0.50	+0.23	
Turnout		78,473	72.48	+0.70	
Eligible voters		108,264			
Conservative hold		Swing		+11.51	
Source: Elections Canada

2015 Canadian federal election
Party	Candidate	Votes	%	±%	Expenditures
Conservative	Blake Richards	42,228	63.37	–7.36	$86,619.91
Liberal	Marlo Raynolds	17,380	26.08	+18.02	$72,801.97
New Democratic	Joanne Boissonneault	4,521	6.78	–6.30	$17,953.20
Green	Mike MacDonald	2,509	3.77	–3.97	$3,011.33
Total valid votes/expense limit		66,638	99.73	–	$243,369.66
Total rejected ballots		179	0.27	+0.02	
Turnout		66,817	71.79	+1.29	
Eligible voters		93,079			
Conservative hold		Swing		–12.69	
This riding was created from parts of Wild Rose and Macleod, both of which elected Conservative candidates in the 2011 election. Blake Richards was the incumbent from Wild Rose. Changes are based on redistributed results.
Source: Elections Canada

2011 federal election redistributed results
Party	Vote	%
Conservative	29,938	70.73
New Democratic	5,534	13.08
Liberal	3,411	8.06
Green	3,277	7.74
Others	165	0.39

== See also ==
- List of Canadian electoral districts
- Historical federal electoral districts of Canada
