= Pioneer Acres Museum =

- Location: Irricana, Alberta, Canada
- Coordinates: 51.33°N 113.61°W
- Type: Agricultural Museum
- Website: www.pioneeracres.ab.ca/

Pioneer Acres Museum is an agricultural and industrial museum located just north of Irricana in Rocky View County in southern Alberta, Canada. The museum is one of the largest agricultural and industrial history museums in Alberta with a collection of thousands of artifacts. Pioneer Acres Museum shares Alberta stories from the beginning of settlement to present day.

Pioneer Acres Museum was established in 1969 when a group of farmers and agricultural aficionados in the Langdon area had the idea of holding an annual event showcasing agricultural equipment from the early 1900s. The group formed a legal entity in 1971 and has continued the tradition of holding an annual show ever since.

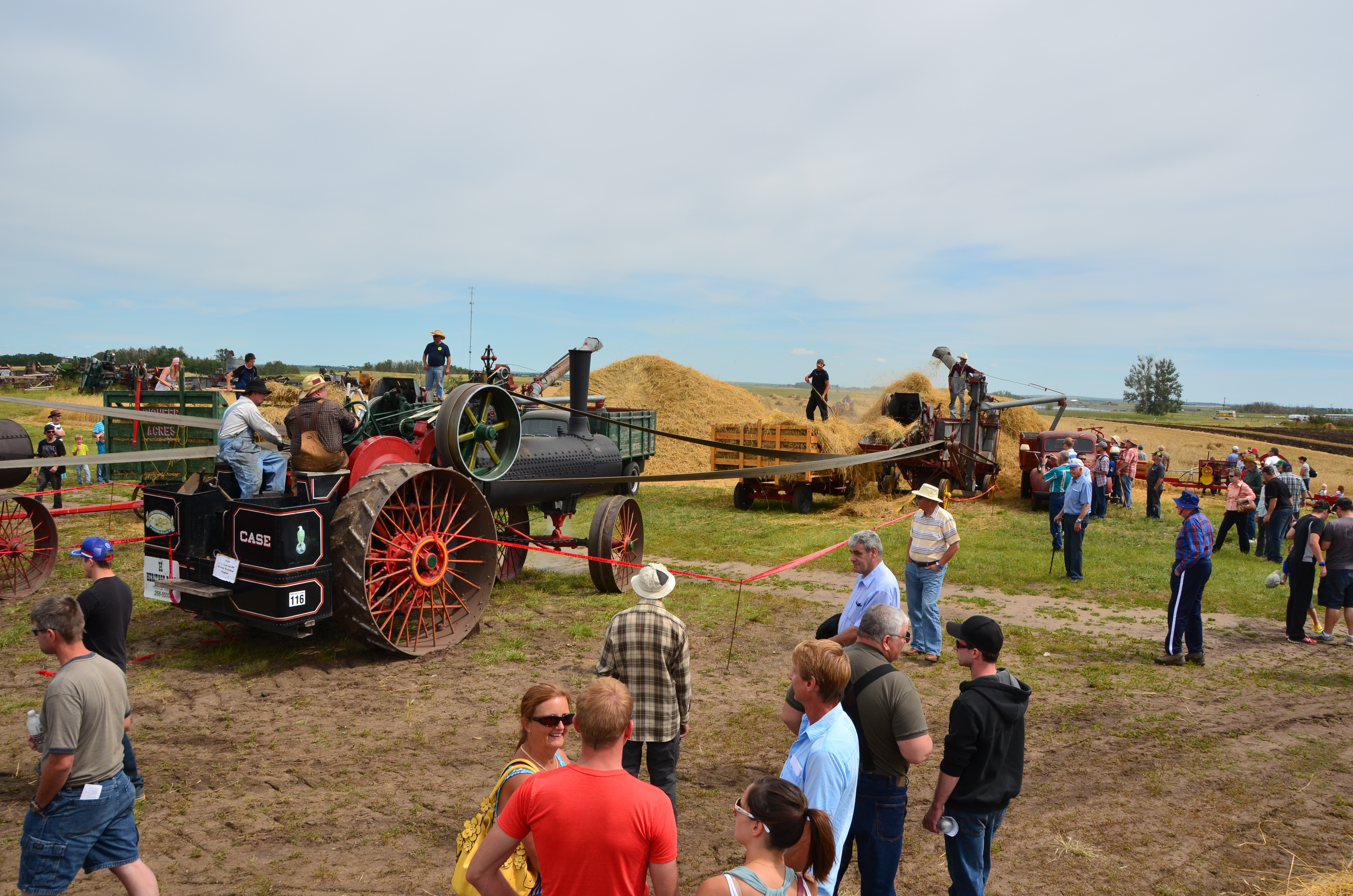
Annual Show - Threshing Demonstration

Pioneer Acres is well known for its Annual Show & Reunion, which takes place every year on the weekend following Alberta's August long weekend. While the Annual Show is an integral part of Pioneer Acres Museum, the museum has become much more than just the show. The museum moved from Langdon to the present property in 1983. It now consists of over 20 buildings on 50 acres of land. It has 2 permanent staff, several part-time staff and hundreds of volunteers. Staff responsibilities are varied and include collections care and conservation, visitor services, gift shop sales, program development and delivery, fundraising, marketing, general and financial administration, and management functions.

Pioneer Acres Museum is committed to collecting a representation of the material evidence of Alberta's agricultural and industrial history, from the settlement period (circa 1870) to approximately 1980. Artifacts made and/or used in the province are a priority. The Museum's extensive collection of agricultural machinery and transportation equipment has become indelibly linked with Pioneer Acres national and international reputations. In addition, the collection contains a wide variety of household, business, and personal artifacts representative of Alberta's history.

The collection of operating farm machinery is on display throughout the summer. There is a historic house, school, blacksmith shop, steam building, stationary engine building and two antique truck buildings. A detailed listing of events can be found by visiting the website.

Pioneer Acres is a member of the Alberta Museum Association.

== Exhibits ==
- Pioneer World - features memorabilia from the pioneer era
- Pole Sheds - several sheds displaying early tractors, threshing machines, and other equipment
- The Grain Academy - chronicles the production and transportation of grain from the early pioneering days to modern times
- Artifact Storage Building
- Members Buildings - dozens of privately owned tractors and other pieces of agricultural equipment
- Stationary Steam Engine Building
- Blacksmith Shop - a working blacksmith shop
- Historic Long House - built in 1914
- Red Barn - display of horse drawn equipment, also used for horses during events
- Crown School - school building from 1905
- Ray Howden Building - tractors, furniture and tools collected by Ray Howden, a farmer in the area
- Pioneer Truck Museum - antique trucks
- Bunkhouse & Cook Car - early mobile buildings
