= High Point Estates, Alberta =

High Point Estates
- Designated place
- Location of High Point Estates High Point Estates (Canada)
- Coordinates: 51.030°N 113.782°W
- Country: Canada
- Province: Alberta
- Region: Calgary Metropolitan Region
- Census division: 6
- Municipal district: Rocky View County

Government
  - Type: Unincorporated
  - Governing body: Rocky View County Council

Area (2021)
  - Land: 0.36 km^{2} (0.14 sq mi)

Population (2021)
  - Total: 84
  - Density: 235.4/km^{2} (610/sq mi)
- Time zone: UTC−06:00 (Alberta Time)
- Area codes: 403, 587, 825

High Point Estates is an unincorporated community in Alberta, Canada within Rocky View County that is recognized as a designated place by Statistics Canada. It is located on Township Road 241A, 0.8 km (0.50 mi) south of Highway 1. It is adjacent to the city of Chestermere to the west.

== Demographics ==
In the 2021 Census of Population conducted by Statistics Canada, High Point Estates had a population of 84 living in 30 of its 31 total private dwellings, a change of −31.1% from its 2016 population of 122. With a land area of 0.36 km^{2} (0.14 sq mi), it had a population density of 233.3/km^{2} (604.3/sq mi) in 2021.

As a designated place in the 2016 Census of Population conducted by Statistics Canada, High Point Estates had a population of 122 living in 36 of its 36 total private dwellings, a change of 22% from its 2011 population of 100. With a land area of 0.26 km^{2} (0.10 sq mi), it had a population density of 469.2/km^{2} (1,215.3/sq mi) in 2016.

== See also ==
- List of communities in Alberta
- List of designated places in Alberta
