= Janet, Alberta =

Janet
- Hamlet
- Location of Janet Janet (Canada)
- Coordinates: 51°00′29″N 113°52′13″W
- Country: Canada
- Province: Alberta
- Region: Calgary Metropolitan Region
- Census division: 6
- Municipal district: Rocky View County

Government
  - Type: Unincorporated
  - Governing body: Rocky View County Council

Population (2006)
  - Total: 1
- Time zone: UTC−06:00 (Alberta Time)
- Area codes: 403, 587, 825

Janet is a hamlet in southern Alberta under the jurisdiction of Rocky View County. It is located on Township Road 240, approximately 13 km (8.1 mi) east of downtown Calgary, 5.9 km (3.7 mi) southwest of the City of Chestermere, and 3.2 km (2.0 mi) south of Highway 1A. Janet is primarily an industrial area that is home to some transportation and logistics companies.

== History ==
Janet began as a siding and flag station built by the Canadian National Railway at which a station was erected in 1912. It is believed that the Harry Whittaker family was one of Janet's first settlers. Whittaker built a house approximately 200 m (660 ft) from the crossing. The Columbia Grain Co. built an elevator in 1928 and rented it to Parrish & Heimbecker. It carried the Columbia name for many years thereafter.

For a period of time in the mid-2000s, Janet was considered for annexation by the City of Calgary in its negotiations with Rocky View County. Although the annexation that occurred on July 31, 2007 did not include the hamlet, the annexation brought Calgary's city limits 2.5 km (1.6 mi) to the west and 0.8 km (0.50 mi) to the north of Janet. The hamlet remains within a Rocky View County industrial growth corridor, while lands north of Township Road 240 are within a joint planning area.

== Demographics ==
The population of Janet according to the 2006 municipal census conducted by Rocky View County is 1.

== See also ==
- List of communities in Alberta
- List of hamlets in Alberta
