= Canadian House of Commons Standing Committee on Veterans Affairs =

Standing committee of the House of Commons of Canada

The House of Commons Standing Committee on Veterans Affairs (ACVA) is a standing committee of the House of Commons of Canada. It was established in the 39th Canadian Parliament.

== Mandate ==
- The mandate and management of Veterans Affairs Canada and related agencies
- Commemorative military celebrations in the near future
- Review of the delivery of front-line health services for Canadian veterans

== Membership ==
As of the 45th Canadian Parliament:

Party	Member	District
Liberal	Marie-France Lalonde, chair	Orléans, ON
Conservative	Blake Richards, vice chair	Airdrie—Cochrane, AB
Bloc Quebecois	Marie-Hélène Gaudreau, vice chair	Laurentides—Labelle, QC
Liberal	Tatiana Auguste	Terrebonne, QC
Liberal	Sean Casey	Charlottetown, PE
Liberal	Braedon Clark	Sackville—Bedford—Preston, NS
Liberal	Alana Hirtle	Cumberland—Colchester, NS
Conservative	Fraser Tolmie	Moose Jaw—Lake Centre—Lanigan, SK
Conservative	Arnold Viersen	Peace River—Westlock, AB
Conservative	Cathay Wagantall	Yorkton—Melville, SK

== Subcommittees ==
- Subcommittee on Agenda and Procedure (SACV)
