= Blake Richards =

Canadian politician (born 1974)

Blake Richards MP
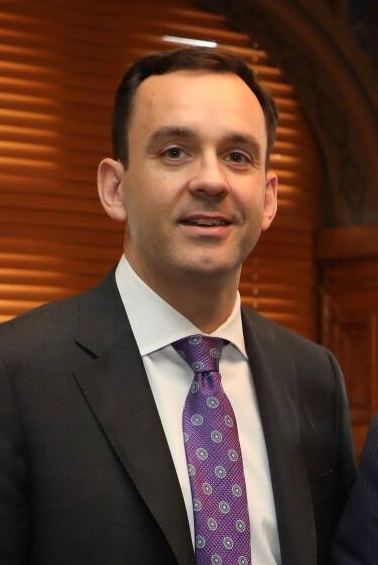

Chief Opposition Whip
- In office September 2, 2020 – February 5, 2022
- Leader: Erin O'Toole
- Preceded by: Mark Strahl
- Succeeded by: Blaine Calkins

Member of Parliament for Airdrie—Cochrane Banff—Airdrie (2015–2025) Wild Rose (2008–2015)
- Incumbent
- Assumed office October 14, 2008
- Preceded by: Myron Thompson

Personal details
- Born: November 8, 1974 (age 51) Olds, Alberta, Canada
- Party: Conservative
- Spouse: Carmen Richards
- Education: Red Deer College, University of Calgary
- Profession: Real estate agent Firefighter

Blake Richards MP (born November 8, 1974) is a Canadian politician. He has been a Conservative Member of Parliament since 2008, having been elected to represent the electoral district (riding) of Wild Rose in the 2008 and 2011 federal elections and subsequently the riding of Banff—Airdrie in federal elections held in 2015, 2019, and 2021. In 2025, he was re-elected in the constituency of Airdrie—Cochrane.

== Early life and career ==
Richards was born in Olds, Alberta. Prior to starting his real estate business, Richards worked in the oil field and agriculture-related industries, and attended Red Deer College and the University of Calgary, where he earned a degree in political science.

He served his community as a volunteer firefighter and minor hockey coach before being elected to the House of Commons in 2008.

== Federal politics ==
Richards was elected in the 2008 federal election and re-elected in the 2011, 2015, 2019, 2021, and 2025 federal elections.

Richards is currently the Shadow Minister for Veterans Affairs. He previously served as Chief Opposition Whip, Official Opposition Shadow Minister for Small Business, Export Promotion and Tourism. In the 41st Parliament, Richards chaired the Parliamentary Tourism Caucus and the House of Commons' Standing Committee on Aboriginal Affairs and Northern Development and the Special Committee on Co-operatives. He has also been a member of the committees on Finance; International Trade; Public Safety and National Security; Procedure and House Affairs; Canadian Heritage; Agriculture; and Transport, Infrastructure and Communities.

Through the Rocky Mountain Hockey Challenge, Richards has raised $360,000 for regional groups that assist victims of crime.

In 2010, Richards spearheaded a national petition that called for changes to the national pardons system after it was revealed that convicted sex offender Graham James had received a pardon in 2007 for his offences. The petition attracted thousands of supporters from across Canada and in June 2010, Bill C-23A, an act to limit pardons for serious crimes, received Royal Assent.

In October 2011, Richards introduced Private Member's Bill C-309 in the House of Commons. It received Royal Assent in June 2013. As a result, it is now an offence under the Criminal Code of Canada to wear a mask or to otherwise conceal one's identity during a riot or an unlawful assembly.

On November 30, 2017, House of Commons Speaker Geoff Regan ordered that Richards be removed from the House for "excessive heckling" following three repeated warnings.

In 2018, Richards' Motion 110, directing the Human Resources Committee to study the impact of pregnancy and infant loss on parents, was supported unanimously in the House of Commons.

Richards has three times been recognized as the Hardest Working and Best Constituency MP in The Hill Times' Annual Politically Savvy Survey and has been recognized with a Canadian Tourism Award for his work in Parliament on behalf of the tourism industry.

Richards says his priority as a representative is to be "focused on being a strong voice for the people of Airdrie–Cochrane—bringing their priorities, values, and concerns straight to the heart of Parliament."

He was elected vice chair of the Canadian House of Commons Standing Committee on Veterans Affairs in the 45th Canadian Parliament in 2025.

== Electoral record ==
2025 Canadian federal election: Airdrie—Cochrane
Party	Candidate	Votes	%	±%	Expenditures
Conservative	Blake Richards	50,252	71.22	+11.32	$69,906.14
Liberal	Sean Secord	16,714	23.69	+13.53	$16,513.62
New Democratic	Sarah Zagoda	2,591	3.67	–11.25	$5,708.11
Libertarian	David Sabine	623	0.88	–	$907.71
Christian Heritage	Christopher Bell	380	0.54	–	$1,250.00
Total valid votes/expense limit		70,560	99.36	–	$139,222.40
Total rejected ballots		457	0.64	–	
Turnout		71,017	74.70	–	
Eligible voters		95,076			
Conservative notional hold		Swing		−1.11	
Source: Elections Canada

2021 Canadian federal election: Banff—Airdrie
Party	Candidate	Votes	%	±%	Expenditures
Conservative	Blake Richards	43,677	56.73	–14.36	$82,283.53
New Democratic	Sarah Zagoda	12,482	16.21	+5.73	$5,649.63
Liberal	David Gamble	9,572	12.43	+1.64	$27,675.24
People's	Nadine Wellwood	5,808	7.54	+4.14	$25,373.84
No Affiliation	Derek Sloan	2,020	2.62	–	$124,282.97
Maverick	Tariq Elnaga	1,475	1.92	–	$17,960.91
Green	Aidan Blum	1,405	1.82	–2.43	none listed
Independent	Caroline O'Driscoll	489	0.64	–	$10,142.91
Independent	Ron Voss	60	0.08	–	none listed
Total valid votes/expense limit		76,988	99.49	–	$141,669.12
Total rejected ballots		396	0.51	+0.01	
Turnout		77,384	68.78	–3.70	
Eligible voters		112,509			
Conservative hold		Swing		–10.05	
Source: Elections Canada

2019 Canadian federal election: Banff—Airdrie
Party	Candidate	Votes	%	±%	Expenditures
Conservative	Blake Richards	55,504	71.09	+7.72	$79,955.07
Liberal	Gwyneth Midgley	8,425	10.79	–15.29	$8,319.50
New Democratic	Anne Wilson	8,185	10.48	+3.70	$7,756.53
Green	Austin Mullins	3,315	4.25	+0.48	$824.70
People's	Nadine Wellwood	2,651	3.40	–	$21,834.65
Total valid votes/expense limit		78,080	99.50	–	$134,325.72
Total rejected ballots		393	0.50	+0.23	
Turnout		78,473	72.48	+0.70	
Eligible voters		108,264			
Conservative hold		Swing		+11.51	
Source: Elections Canada

2015 Canadian federal election: Banff—Airdrie
Party	Candidate	Votes	%	±%	Expenditures
Conservative	Blake Richards	42,228	63.37	–7.36	$86,619.91
Liberal	Marlo Raynolds	17,380	26.08	+18.02	$72,801.97
New Democratic	Joanne Boissonneault	4,521	6.78	–6.30	$17,953.20
Green	Mike MacDonald	2,509	3.77	–3.97	$3,011.33
Total valid votes/expense limit		66,638	99.73	–	$243,369.66
Total rejected ballots		179	0.27	+0.02	
Turnout		66,817	71.79	+1.29	
Eligible voters		93,079			
Conservative hold		Swing		–12.69	
This riding was created from parts of Wild Rose and Macleod, both of which elected Conservative candidates in the 2011 election. Blake Richards was the incumbent from Wild Rose. Changes are based on redistributed results.
Source: Elections Canada

2011 Canadian federal election: Wild Rose
Party	Candidate	Votes	%	±%	Expenditures
Conservative	Blake Richards	43,669	74.7	+1.8	$49,673
New Democratic	Jeff Horvath	6,595	11.3	+3.1	$3,784
Green	Michael MacDonald	4,071	7.0	-5.6	$5,270
Liberal	John Reilly	3,908	6.7	+1.0	$43,616
Christian Heritage	Randy VandenBroek	181	0.3	–	–
Total valid votes/expense limit		58,424	100.0		
Total rejected ballots		128	0.2	0.0	
Turnout		58,552	61.7	+6.0	
Eligible voters		94,970	–	–	
Conservative hold		Swing		+3.7	

2008 Canadian federal election: Wild Rose
Party	Candidate	Votes	%	±%	Expenditures
Conservative	Blake Richards	36,869	72.9	+0.4	$50,972
Green	Lisa Fox	6,390	12.6	+1.8	$14,559
New Democratic	Jeff Horvath	4,169	8.2	+0.9	$5,001
Liberal	Jenn Turcott	2,890	5.7	-4.0	$6,555
Libertarian	Krista Zoobkoff	246	0.5	–	
Total valid votes/Expense limit		50,564	100.0	$101,401	
Total rejected ballots		107	0.2	0.0	
Turnout		50,671	56	-9.0	
Conservative hold		Swing		+2.2	
