= Wild Rose (electoral district) =

Former federal electoral district in Alberta, Canada

Coordinates: 51.39°N 115.47°W

Alberta electoral district
- Wild Rose in relation to other Alberta ridings

Defunct federal electoral district
- Legislature: House of Commons
- District created: 1986
- District abolished: 2013
- First contested: 1988
- Last contested: 2011
- District webpage: profile, map

Demographics
- Population (2011): 138,617
- Electors (2011): 90,193
- Area (km²): 28,054.46
- Census division(s): Division No. 6, Division No. 9, Division No. 15
- Census subdivision(s): Calgary, Rocky View County, Airdrie, Cochrane, Mountain View County, Canmore, Clearwater County, Olds, Banff, Didsbury

Wild Rose was a federal electoral district in Alberta, Canada, that was represented in the House of Commons of Canada from 1988 to 2015.

== Geography ==
The district was located in the southwest part of Alberta, stretching from the British Columbia border to the outer northern suburbs of Calgary. Within the large riding were: the City of Airdrie, the towns of Olds, Didsbury, Cochrane, Canmore, Sundre, and Banff, the Municipal District of Bighorn No. 8, Mountain View County, Improvement District No. 9, and parts of Clearwater County and Rocky View County. The Stoney First Nation was also located within the riding. The riding was bounded by British Columbia to the west, Calgary to the southeast and Red Deer to the northeast.

== History ==
The electoral district was created in 1986 from Bow River, Red Deer and Macleod ridings. In the 2003 federal riding redistribution, about 30% of this district was transferred to Crowfoot riding, while about 4% of Red Deer riding was transferred to Wild Rose.

Since its creation, Wild Rose was one of the safest ridings in the country for the Conservative Party and its predecessors, which had won every election since 1993 by lopsided margins. Neither the Liberals nor the New Democrats had ever secured more than 15 percent of the vote in Wild Rose.

In the 2006 election, the Green Party finished a distant second with 10.84 percent of the popular vote, which was among the highest percentages received for the Green Party in that election. The Green Party candidate, Lisa Fox, was again the second-place finisher in the October 2008 election, finishing ahead of the Liberal, New Democratic and Libertarian candidates with 6,389 votes, but far behind the winner Richards, who won 72.9 percent of all votes cast (36,869 votes total). In 2011 Richards defeated all of his opponents combined by a nearly three-to-one margin.

The riding was abolished in 2015. Most of the riding became Banff—Airdrie. A smaller part was transferred to Red Deer—Mountain View while a small portion went to Yellowhead.

== List of Members of Parliament ==
This riding has elected the following members of the House of Commons of Canada:

Parliament	Years	Member	Party
Riding created from Bow River, Red Deer and Macleod
34th	1988–1993	Louise Feltham	Progressive Conservative
35th	1993–1997	Myron Thompson	Reform
36th	1997–2000	Myron Thompson	Reform
36th	2000–2000	Myron Thompson	Alliance
37th	2000–2003	Myron Thompson	Alliance
37th	2003–2004	Myron Thompson	Conservative
38th	2004–2006	Myron Thompson	Conservative
39th	2006–2008	Myron Thompson	Conservative
40th	2008–2011	Blake Richards	Conservative
41st	2011–2015	Blake Richards	Conservative
Riding dissolved into Yellowhead, Banff—Airdrie, Red Deer—Mountain View, Calgary Rocky Ridge, Calgary Skyview and Calgary Nose Hill

== Election results ==
2011 Canadian federal election
Party	Candidate	Votes	%	±%	Expenditures
Conservative	Blake Richards	43,669	74.75	+1.83	$50,758.04
New Democratic	Jeff Horvath	6,595	11.29	+3.04	$4,013.97
Green	Mike MacDonald	4,071	6.97	–5.67	$5,269.70
Liberal	John Reilly	3,908	6.69	+0.97	$43,225.20
Christian Heritage	Randy Vanden Broek	181	0.31	–	none listed
Total valid votes/expense limit		58,424	99.78	–	$108,607.98
Total rejected ballots		128	0.22	+0.01	
Turnout		58,552	61.23	+5.05	
Eligible voters		95,631			
Conservative hold		Swing		–	
Source: Elections Canada

2008 Canadian federal election
Party	Candidate	Votes	%	±%	Expenditures
Conservative	Blake Richards	36,869	72.92	+0.75	$47,931.16
Green	Lisa Fox	6,390	12.64	+1.80	$14,362.07
New Democratic	Jeff Horvath	4,169	8.25	+0.99	$5,000.62
Liberal	Jenn Turcott	2,890	5.72	–4.03	$6,554.66
Libertarian	Krista Zoobkoff	246	0.49	–	none listed
Total valid votes/expense limit		50,564	99.79	–	$101,401.29
Total rejected ballots		107	0.21	–0.02	
Turnout		50,671	56.18	–10.51	
Eligible voters		90,193			
Conservative hold		Swing		+1.27	
Source: Elections Canada

2006 Canadian federal election
Party	Candidate	Votes	%	±%	Expenditures
Conservative	Myron Thompson	39,487	72.17	+1.57	$49,582.87
Green	Sean Maw	5,929	10.84	+2.57	$8,652.76
Liberal	Judy Stewart	5,331	9.74	–2.90	$8,249.46
New Democratic	Shannon Nelles	3,968	7.25	–1.24	$2,036.33
Total valid votes/expense limit		54,715	99.77	–	$90,129.54
Total rejected ballots		127	0.23	+0.02	
Turnout		54,842	66.69	+5.19	
Eligible voters		82,230			
Conservative hold		Swing		+2.24	
Source: Elections Canada

2004 Canadian federal election
Party	Candidate	Votes	%	±%	Expenditures
Conservative	Myron Thompson	33,337	70.60	–12.66	$41,324.92
Liberal	Judy Stewart	5,971	12.65	+1.56	$22,692.12
New Democratic	Jeff Horvath	4,009	8.49	+4.43	$5,296.46
Green	Chris Foote	3,904	8.27	–	$696.47
Total valid votes/expense limit		47,221	99.79	–	$85,605.66
Total rejected ballots		101	0.21	–0.09	
Turnout		47,322	61.51	–1.01	
Eligible voters		76,939			
Conservative hold		Swing		–7.11	
Source: Elections Canada

2000 Canadian federal election
Party	Candidate	Votes	%	±%	Expenditures
Alliance	Myron Thompson	40,193	70.36	+6.57	$38,078
Progressive Conservative	Truper McBride	7,370	12.90	–6.09	$17,837
Liberal	Bryan E. Mahoney	6,334	11.09	–1.03	$8,304
New Democratic	Anne Wilson	2,320	4.06	+0.50	$2,552
Independent	Garnet T. Hammer	908	1.59	–	$72
Total valid votes		57,125	99.69		
Total rejected ballots		175	0.31	+0.11	
Turnout		57,300	62.52	+2.05	
Eligible voters		91,655			
Alliance hold		Swing		+6.33	
Source: Elections Canada

1997 Canadian federal election
Party	Candidate	Votes	%	±%	Expenditures
Reform	Myron Thompson	28,569	63.79	+0.04	$43,013
Progressive Conservative	Bert Dyck	8,506	18.99	+3.48	$34,928
Liberal	Bryan E. Mahoney	5,428	12.12	–2.08	$9,259
New Democratic	Anne Wilson	1,594	3.56	+1.36	$2,614
Green	Vanessa Violini	692	1.55	+0.61	$275
Total valid votes		44,789	99.80		
Total rejected ballots		88	0.20	–0.06	
Turnout		44,877	60.47	–5.70	
Eligible voters		74,214			
Reform hold		Swing		+1.76	
Source: Elections Canada

1993 Canadian federal election
Party	Candidate	Votes	%	±%
Reform	Myron Thompson	30,986	63.75	+30.32
Progressive Conservative	Louise Feltham	7,542	15.52	–32.72
Liberal	Roy Shellnutt	6,902	14.20	+4.08
New Democratic	Anne Wilson	1,067	2.20	–5.52
National	Stuart Hughes	809	1.66	–
Independent	Michael Leslie	562	1.16	–
Green	Scott Chisholm Lamont	457	0.94	–
Natural Law	Dale Doram	204	0.42	–
Independent	Dave Strang	80	0.17	–
Total valid votes		48,609	99.74	
Total rejected ballots		125	0.26	+0.08
Turnout		48,734	66.17	–11.67
Eligible voters		73,655		
Reform gain from Progressive Conservative		Swing		+31.52
Source: Elections Canada

1988 Canadian federal election
Party	Candidate	Votes	%	±%
Progressive Conservative	Louise Feltham	20,054	48.24	–
Reform	Dal Brown	13,895	33.42	–
Liberal	Cathy Richards	4,209	10.12	–
New Democratic	Robin Slater	3,209	7.72	–
Confederation of Regions	Dennis S. Combs	209	0.50	–
Total valid votes		41,576	99.82	
Total rejected ballots		74	0.18	–
Turnout		41,650	77.83	–
Eligible voters		53,511		
Progressive Conservative notional hold		Swing		–
Source: Elections Canada

== See also ==
- List of Canadian electoral districts
- Historical federal electoral districts of Canada
