= Myron Thompson =

Canadian politician (1936–2019)

Member of Parliament for Wild Rose
- In office October 25, 1993 – October 14, 2008
- Preceded by: Louise Feltham
- Succeeded by: Blake Richards

Personal details
- Born: April 23, 1936 Monte Vista, Colorado, U.S.
- Died: January 5, 2019 (aged 82) Sundre, Alberta, Canada
- Party: Conservative
- Spouse: Dot Thompson
- Profession: Educator

Myron D. Thompson (April 23, 1936 – January 5, 2019) was a Conservative Member of Parliament in the House of Commons of Canada. He represented the riding of Wild Rose in Alberta.

== Early life and education ==
A dual citizen of Canada and the United States, Thompson was born and raised in Monte Vista, Colorado. At the age 19 he tried out for the New York Yankees as a catcher, but failed to make the team due to Yogi Berra's dominance at the position. Years later in a meeting with U.S. President George W. Bush, upon hearing of the tryout, Bush looked at Thompson's hands and guessed which position he played.

In the 1950s, Thompson studied at Adams State College in Colorado, where he received a Bachelor of Arts in Business Administration and Education.

== Career ==
Thompson served in the United States Army from 1958 to 1960. He moved to Canada in 1968 and became a citizen in 1974. For 23 years, Thompson was a high school teacher and then principal, and later became the mayor of Sundre, Alberta, serving from 1974 to 1980.

Thompson was first elected to Parliament in 1993 as a member of the Reform Party, and continued to serve under its successors the Canadian Alliance and the Conservative Party of Canada. He became known for wearing a cowboy hat, and lobbied unsuccessfully to be allowed to wear it on the floor of the Commons. He claimed that the cowboy hat was part of his heritage, and he had as much right to wear it as MPs had the right to wear turbans or native feathers.

While serving in opposition, Thompson was harshly critical of the Liberal government. Issues he has focused on include government spending, same-sex marriage, victims' rights, child pornography, and prison reform.

In 1994, the Reform Party passed a policy at its national convention to deny family benefits to same-sex couples. Thompson said at the time, "I do not hate homosexuals – I hate homosexuality."

In 2001, Thompson stated in question period that he felt too many RCMP officers were patrolling national parks searching for poachers instead of hunting in cities for terrorists.

Thompson was one of the loudest critics of former Prime Minister Jean Chrétien's decision that Canada would not take part in the multinational force in Iraq and the 2003 invasion of Iraq.

In 2006, after a decision to ban media members from the base where the bodies of Canadian soldiers were arriving from Afghanistan, Thompson said he would shoot any media member if they attempted to come on site to cover a dead son of his.

In June 2007, Thompson announced that he would not be running for re-election, and as a result stepped down from Parliament after the 2008 federal election.

== Personal life ==
Thompson's son, Dennis Thompson, who also has dual American-Canadian citizenship, enlisted in the U.S. Army in 1996 and later served for a year in Iraq and Afghanistan. Thompson died of pancreatic cancer on January 5, 2019, at the age of 82.
