= Airdrie—Cochrane (federal electoral district) =

Federal electoral district in Alberta, Canada

Alberta electoral district
- Interactive map of riding boundaries from the 2025 federal election

Federal electoral district
- Legislature: House of Commons
MP
Blake Richards
Conservative
- District created: 2023
- First contested: 2025
- Last contested: 2025

Demographics
- Population (2021): 115,230
- Census division: Division No. 6
- Census subdivision(s): Airdrie, Rocky View (part), Cochrane

Airdrie—Cochrane is a federal electoral district in Calgary Metropolitan Region, Alberta, Canada. It came into effect upon the call of the 2025 Canadian federal election, following the 2022 Canadian federal electoral redistribution.

== Demographics ==
According to the 2021 Canadian census

Languages: 86.9% English, 2.5% French, 1.5% Tagalog, 1.4% Spanish, 1.3% Punjabi

Religions: 47.8% Christian (18.0% Catholic, 4.1% United Church, 2.7% Anglican, 1.7% Lutheran, 1.4% Baptist, 1.3% Pentecostal, 1.2% Latter Day Saints, 17.3% Other), 46.2% No religion, 2.4% Muslim, 1.7% Sikh

Median income: $50,800 (2020)

Average income: $65,600 (2020)

Panethnic groups in Airdrie—Cochrane (2021)
Panethnic group	2021	
Panethnic group	Pop.	%
European (Note: Statistic includes all persons that did not make up part of a visible minority or an indigenous identity.)	89,940	78.79%
Indigenous	5,360	4.7%
South Asian	4,955	4.34%
Southeast Asian (Note: Statistic includes total responses of "Filipino" and "Southeast Asian" under visible minority section on census.)	4,230	3.71%
African	3,910	3.43%
Latin American	1,910	1.67%
East Asian (Note: Statistic includes total responses of "Chinese", "Korean", and "Japanese" under visible minority section on census.)	1,730	1.52%
Middle Eastern (Note: Statistic includes total responses of "West Asian" and "Arab" under visible minority section on census.)	1,145	1%
Other/multiracial (Note: Statistic includes total responses of "Visible minority, n.i.e." and "Multiple visible minorities" under visible minority section on census.)	970	0.85%
Total responses	114,145	99.05%
Total population	115,240	100%
Notes: Totals greater than 100% due to multiple origin responses. Demographics based on 2022 Canadian federal electoral redistribution riding boundaries.

== History ==
It was created in 2023 as "Airdrie—Cochrane" from parts of Banff—Airdrie, including the Airdrie, Cochrane, and parts of Rocky View County.

Parliament	Years	Member	Party
Airdrie—Cochrane; Riding created from Banff—Airdrie
45th	2025–present	Blake Richards	Conservative

== Electoral results ==
2025 Canadian federal election
Party	Candidate	Votes	%	±%	Expenditures
Conservative	Blake Richards	50,252	71.22	+11.32	$69,906.14
Liberal	Sean Secord	16,714	23.69	+13.53	$16,513.62
New Democratic	Sarah Zagoda	2,591	3.67	–11.25	$5,708.11
Libertarian	David Sabine	623	0.88	–	$907.71
Christian Heritage	Christopher Bell	380	0.54	–	$1,250.00
Total valid votes/expense limit		70,560	99.36	–	$139,222.40
Total rejected ballots		457	0.64	–	
Turnout		71,017	74.70	–	
Eligible voters		95,076			
Conservative notional hold		Swing		−1.11	
Source: Elections Canada

2021 federal election redistributed results
Party	Vote	%
Conservative	33,821	59.90
New Democratic	8,427	14.92
Liberal	5,739	10.16
People's	4,649	8.23
Green	712	1.26
Others	3,115	5.52

== See also ==
- List of Canadian federal electoral districts
