= John Reilly (judge) =

John Reilly (born June 26, 1946 in Calgary, Alberta) is a former judge and best selling author. He served for 33 years as a judge of the Provincial Court of Alberta, largely in the area around Canmore and Cochrane, Alberta, until retiring in 2008.

In the late 1990s, Reilly received attention for his criticism of social and living conditions on the Stoney Nakota First Nations reserve, as well as allegations of political corruption and financial mismanagement against the reserve's administration. After retiring from the regular court bench in 2008, Reilly continued to serve as a supernumerary judge. In late 2010 he published a book, Bad Medicine: A Judge's Struggle for Justice in a First Nations Community, recounting his experiences as a criminal court judge, views on Canadian justice system and the concept of restorative justice, and his interactions with the Nakoda people of the Stoney reserve.

In March 2011, Reilly resigned as a supernumerary judge and declared his candidacy in the Alberta riding of Wild Rose for the Liberal Party of Canada in the 2011 Canadian federal election. On April 7, 2011, Reilly attracted controversy for comments he made about mandatory minimum sentencing for sexual assault, while being interviewed by radio host Dave Rutherford.
