= Glenbow Ranch Provincial Park =

Provincial park in Alberta, Canada

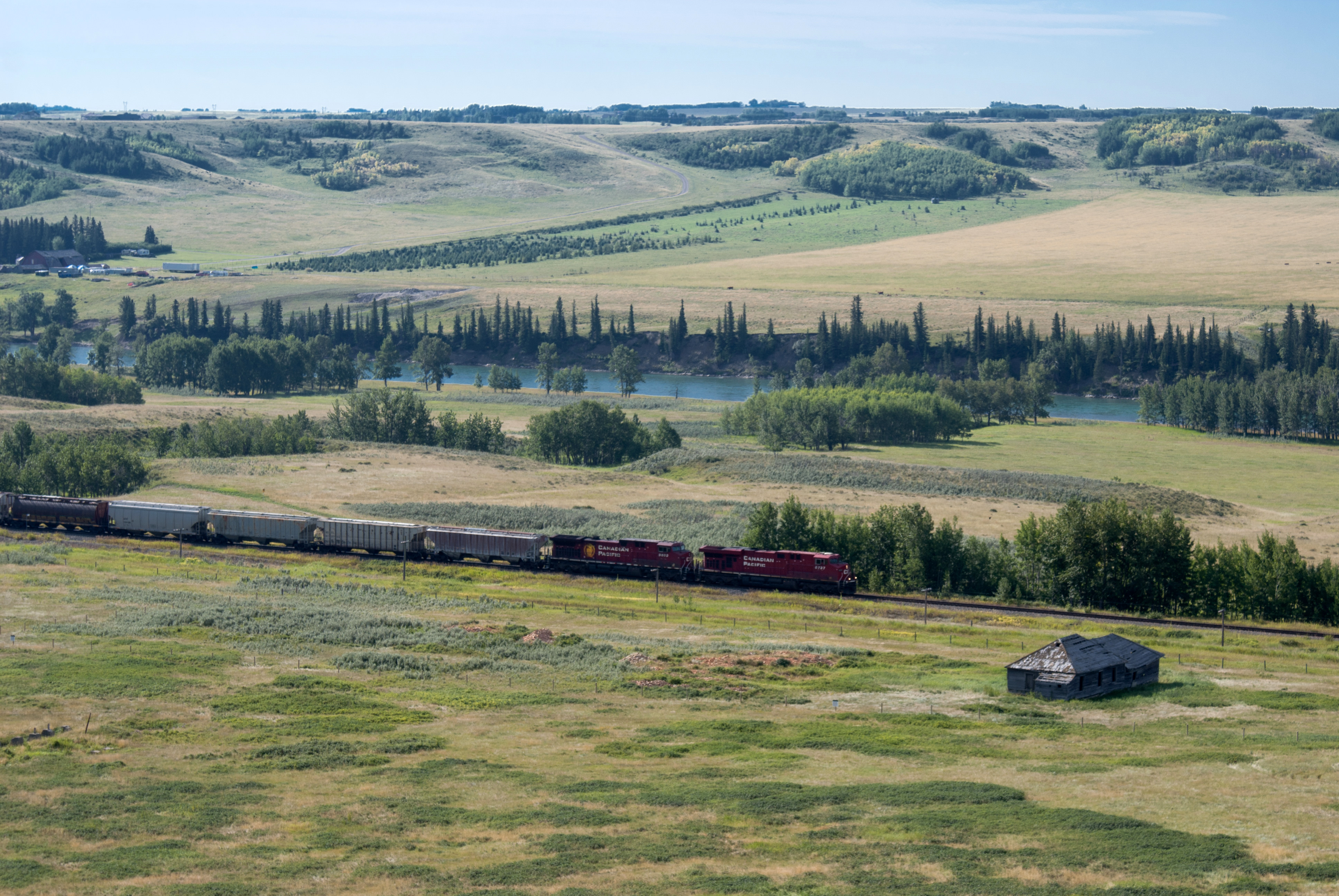
- Glenbow Ranch Provincial Park

- Location within Alberta
- Interactive map of Glenbow Ranch Provincial Park
- Location: Alberta Canada
- Nearest city: Calgary
- Coordinates: 51.167020°N 114.392653°W
- Area: 13.48 km^{2} (5.20 sq mi)
- Established: April 17, 2008
- Governing body: Alberta Tourism, Parks and Recreation

Glenbow Ranch Provincial Park is a provincial park in the Calgary Region of Alberta, Canada. The majority of the park is located on the north bank of the Bow River within Rocky View County. Portions of the eastern and western extremities of the park are located within the City of Calgary and the Town of Cochrane respectively.

== History ==
Plans to establish Glenbow Ranch Provincial Park began in 2006 when the children of Alberta rancher Neil Harvie sold 3,246 acres (1,314 ha) of land to the Government of Alberta for less than market value to conserve the land and protect it from development. Appraised at $67 million in 2005 and with an estimated value of $80 million in 2006, the land was sold to the province for $40 million and a $27 million charitable tax receipt. Under the deal, the Harvie family also established a $6 million foundation to promote and develop the park and Lois Hole Centennial Provincial Park near Edmonton.

Glenbow Ranch was officially designated as a provincial park by an order in council on April 17, 2008. The designation involved an additional 51 acres (21 ha) of land for a total of 3,297 acres (1,334 ha). The park officially opened to visitors on August 9, 2011.

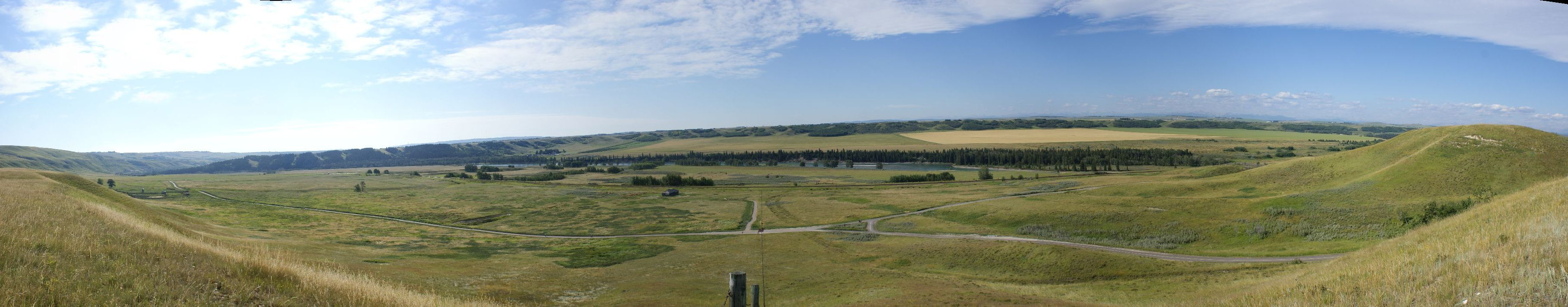
Glenbow Ranch Provincial Park from Lookout on Tiger Lily Loop

== See also ==
- List of Alberta provincial parks
- List of Canadian provincial parks
- List of National Parks of Canada
