= Irricana =

- Town
- Town of Irricana
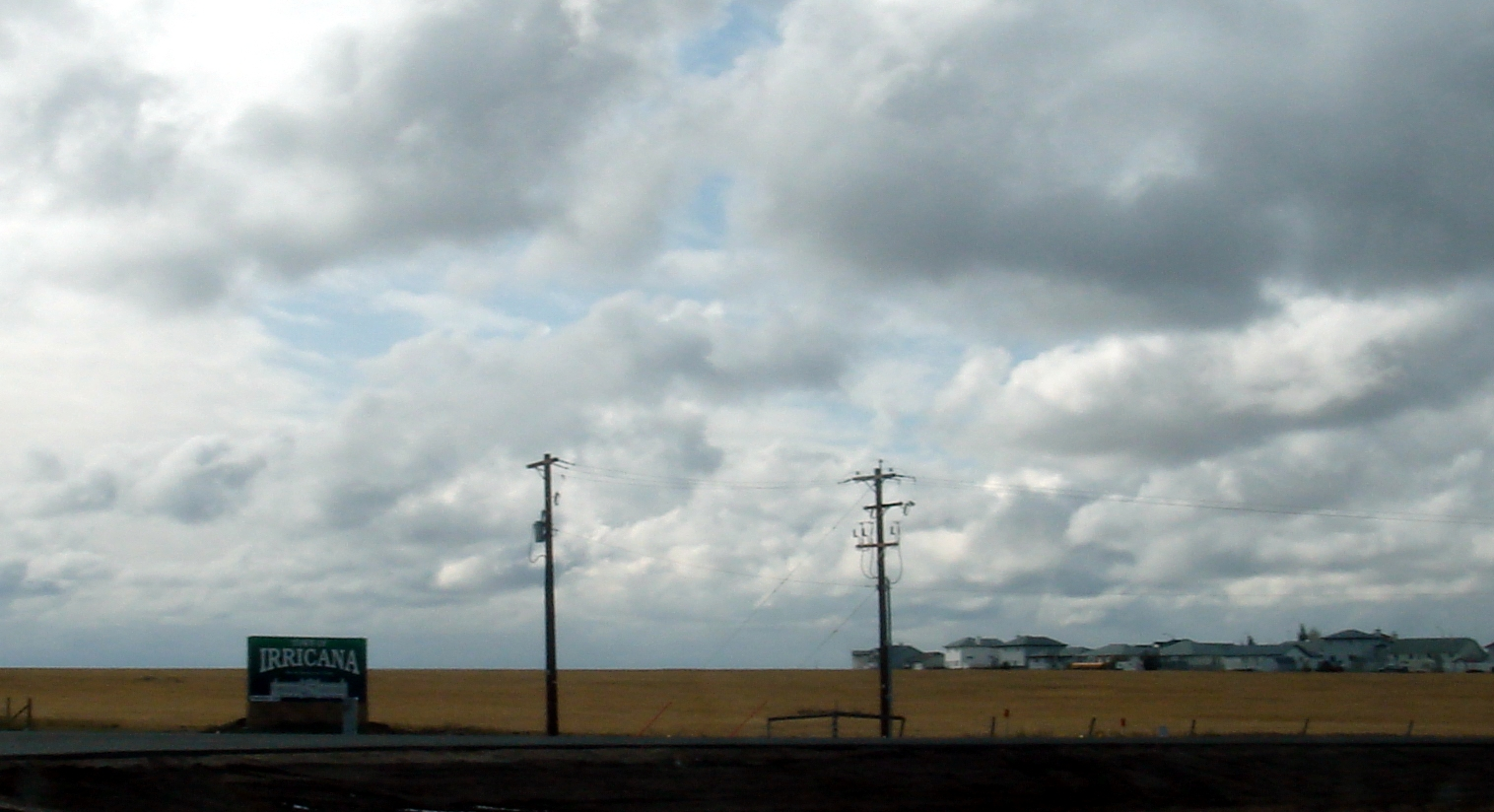
- Motto: Open the Gateway to the Country
- Location within Alberta
- Coordinates: 51°19′08″N 113°36′38″W
- Country: Canada
- Province: Alberta
- Region: Calgary Region
- Census division: 6
- Municipal district: Rocky View County
- Incorporated
  - Village: June 9, 1911
  - Town: June 9, 2005

Government
  - Mayor: Jim Bryson
  - Governing body: Irricana Town Council

Area (2021)
  - Land: 3.23 km^{2} (1.25 sq mi)
- Elevation: 935 m (3,068 ft)

Population (2021)
  - Total: 1,179
  - Density: 364.6/km^{2} (944/sq mi)
- Time zone: UTC−06:00 (Alberta Time)
- Postal code span: T0M 1B0
- Area codes: 403, 587, 825, 368
- Highway: Highway 9
- Waterway: Crossfield Creek
- Website: Official website

Irricana /ˌɪrɪˈkænə/ is a town in the Calgary Metropolitan Region of Alberta, Canada. Surrounded by Rocky View County, it is adjacent to Highway 9, approximately 53 kilometres (33 mi) northeast of Calgary.

The name of the town is a portmanteau of the words "irrigation canals", which are found around the Irricana area.

== History ==
The name dates the town back to the irrigation projects in the area. By 1909, the town had a post office, hotel and store operated by the Irricana Trading Company. Originally incorporated as a village on June 9, 1911, Irricana changed its status to a town 94 years later on June 9, 2005. Irricana celebrated its centennial in 2011.

== Demographics ==
In the 2021 Census of Population conducted by Statistics Canada, the Town of Irricana had a population of 1,179 living in 467 of its 483 total private dwellings, a change of −3% from its 2016 population of 1,216. With a land area of 3.23 km^{2} (1.25 sq mi), it had a population density of 365.0/km^{2} (945.4/sq mi) in 2021.

In the 2016 Census of Population conducted by Statistics Canada, the Town of Irricana recorded a population of 1,216 living in 473 of its 479 total private dwellings, a 4.6% change from its 2011 population of 1,162. With a land area of 3.23 km^{2} (1.25 sq mi), it had a population density of 376.5/km^{2} (975.1/sq mi) in 2016.

== See also ==
- List of communities in Alberta
- List of towns in Alberta
