= Alberta Highway 563 =

Highway in Alberta, Canada

Highway 563
- Old Banff Coach Road
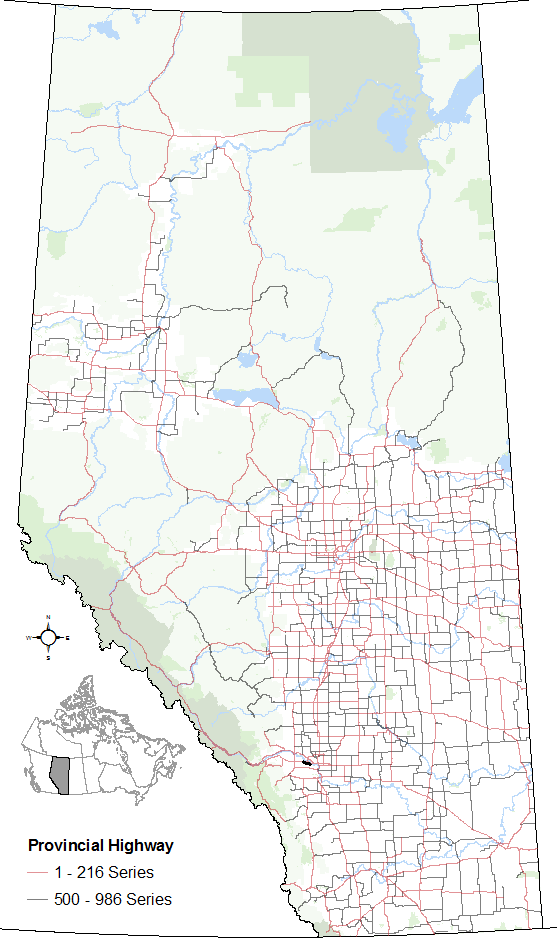

Route information
- Maintained by the City of Calgary and Alberta Transportation

Old Banff Coach Road
- Length: 11.4 km (7.1 mi)
- West end: Highway 1 (TCH) west of Calgary
- East end: Bow Trail in Calgary

Highway 563
- Length: 6.2 km (3.9 mi)
- West end: Highway 1 (TCH) west of Calgary
- East end: 101 Street SW (Calgary city limits)

Location
- Country: Canada
- Province: Alberta
- Specialized and rural municipalities: Rocky View County
- Major cities: Calgary

Highway system
- Alberta Numbered Highway Network; List; Former
← Highway 562	→ Highway 564

Alberta Provincial Highway No. 563, commonly referred to as Highway 563, is a short highway in the province of Alberta, Canada. It runs mostly west-east from Highway 1 exit 172 at Range Road 31 to Calgary city limits at Range Road 24 (101 Street SW). It is known as Old Banff Coach Road for its entire length, and unlike other provincial highways, has a speed limit of only 50 km/h (31 mph) outside of Calgary.

== Major intersections ==
Starting from the west end of Old Banff Coach Road:

Location	km	mi	Destinations	Notes
Rocky View County	−1.0	−0.62	Township Road 250	
Rocky View County	0.0	0.0	Highway 1 (TCH) – Banff, Calgary (16 Avenue NW)	Interchange; Highway 1 exit 172; Highway 563 / Old Banff Coach Road western terminus
Rocky View County	0.4	0.25	Range Road 31	Highway 563 / Old Banff Coach Road turns southeast
Rocky View County	5.7	3.5	Springbank Road (Township Road 244)	Highway 563 / Old Banff Coach Road branches east
Calgary	6.6	4.1	Stoney Trail (Highway 201)	Northbound entrance and southbound exit; Highway 201 exit 34; Highway 563 eastern terminus
Calgary	7.8	4.8	85 Street SW	
Calgary	9.8	6.1	Patterson Hill / Coach Hill Road	
Calgary	10.4	6.5	Patterson Boulevard	
Calgary	10.8	6.7	Coach Hill Road	
Calgary	11.4	7.1	Bow Trail / Strathcona Boulevard	Old Banff Coach Road eastern terminus; continues as Strathcona Boulevard
1.000 mi = 1.609 km; 1.000 km = 0.621 mi: Closed/former; Route transition

== See also ==
- Transportation in Calgary
