= Bearspaw, Alberta =

Bearspaw
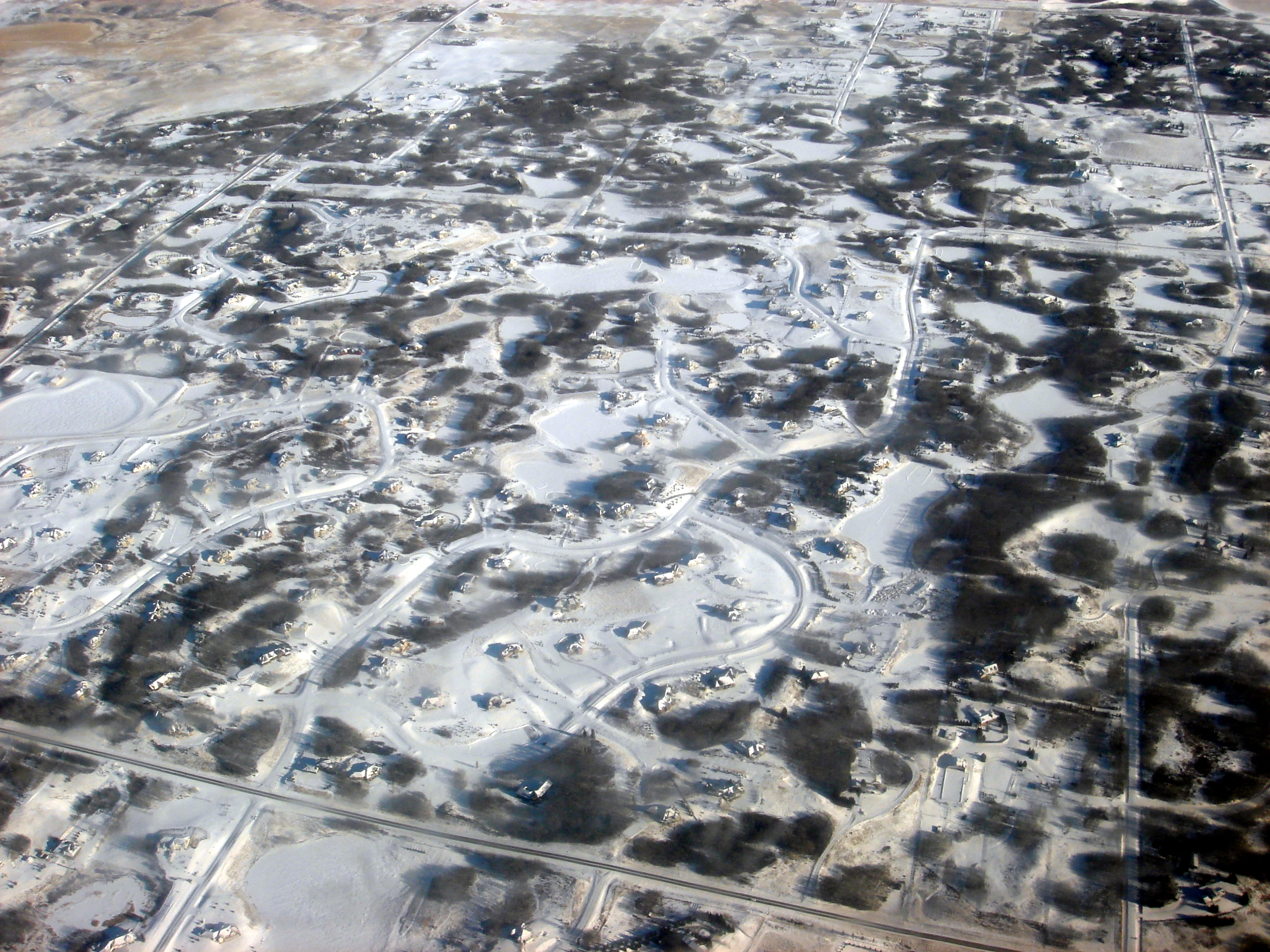
- Acreages of Bearspaw

- Location within Alberta
- Coordinates: 51.13861°N 114.31120°W
- Country: Canada
- Province: Alberta
- Municipal district: Rocky View County
- Established: 1879

Government
  - Type: Un-incorporated
  - Reeve: Greg Boehlke
  - Governing body: Rocky View County Council: Jerry Arshinoff; Rolly Ashdown; Margaret Bahcheli; Greg Boehlke; Liz Breakey; Lois Habberfield; Bruce Kendall; Eric Lowther; Earl Solberg
- Elevation: 1,105 m (3,625 ft)

Population
  - Total: 5,567 (2 018)
- Time zone: UTC−06:00 (Alberta Time)
- Zip Code: T3L

Bearspaw is rural area in southern Alberta, Canada in Rocky View County. It has a population of 5,567 (2018).

The original inhabitants of the Bearspaw area were the Niitsitapi or Blackfoot nation. The Blackfoot nation consisted of four different tribes, Siksika, Piegan Blackfeet, Piikani Nation and Kaninai (Blood Indians).

To the south-east of Bearspaw is the City of Calgary, and the Town of Cochrane is to its west, along Highway 1A. The area of Bearspaw is north of the Bow River and directly east of Glendale Community within Rocky View County.

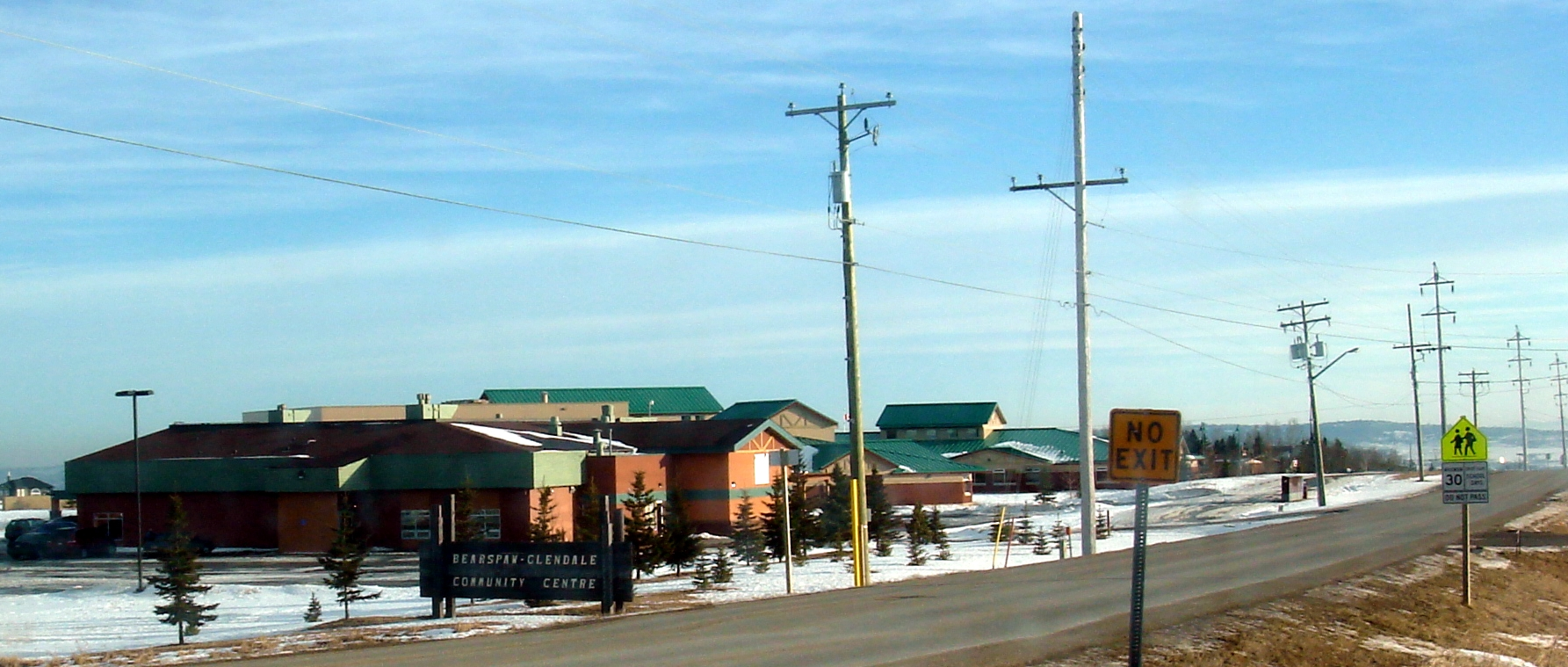
Bearspaw Community Centre and School

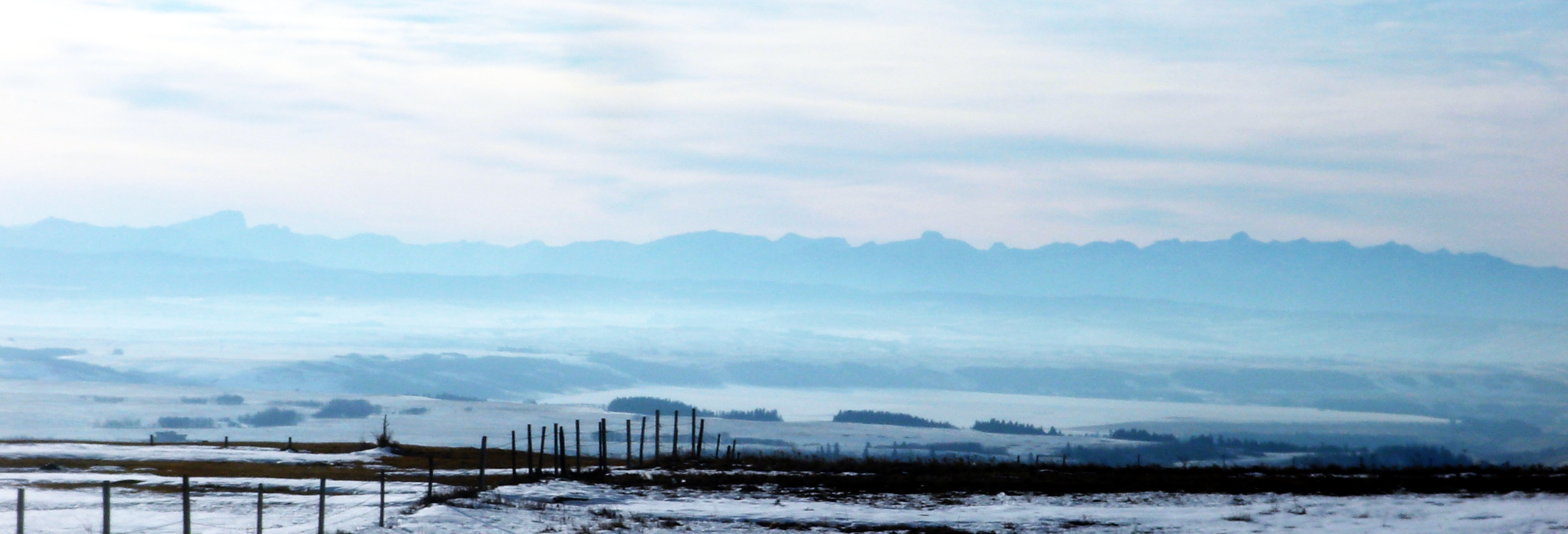
View of the Canadian Rockies from Bearspaw

The zone for Bearspaw schooling is under the Rocky View Schools which is made up of the Bearspaw School which admits students from kindergarten to year 8 and Cochrane High School for students years 9 to year 12. Bearspaw falls under the Cochrane Minor Hockey Association for their local hockey league.

== History ==
The Canadian Pacific Railway Station was built in 1909, when the area was officially named Bearspaw. The origin of the name derives from the head of the Stoney Nations, Chief Masgwaahsid, also known as Bears Paw. Masgwaahsid is famous for his significance as a delegate along with other First Nations people for when they met with representatives of the Queen of Britain on the 22nd September 1877 to sign Treaty No.7. There was a total of five different First Nations tribes involved these were, Stoney-Nakoda, Piikani (Peigan), Kainnai (Blood), Tsuut'ina (Sarcee) and the Siksika (Blackfoot). The treaty included terms which agreed to portions of land given to the native people, varying on the size of each family, payments were also made to every individual, both immediately and annually. The government also provided tools and cattle to each family.

Dairy farmers initially established the location of Bearspaw. It wasn't until 1920 when Bearspaw had its first schoolhouse constructed, containing a single classroom which was functional for forty-five years until being closed in 1965. Bearspaw gradually attracted an increasing number of residents through the combination of ranches, farms, planned subdivisions and large private acreages.

== Climate ==
Bearspaw has an annual average temperature of 3.1 °C (37.6 °F). On average the warmest month is July, when Bearspaw has an average of 14.8 °C (58.6 °F), and the coldest month on average is January, with an average temperature of −8.2 °C (17.2 °F).

In Bearspaw, overall the average precipitation in a year is 469.9 mm (18.50 in). The highest average amount of precipitation for one month occurs in June with 106.7 mm (4.20 in) and the lowest average amount of precipitation for one month occurs in January with 10.2 mm (0.40 in). Bearspaw also has an average of 125 cm of snow, with the most snowfall occurring in March with an average of 21.6 mm (0.85 in).

== Hydroelectric Facility ==
In 1954 Bearspaw had a hydroelectric power plant built, the main objective was to prevent the City of Calgary's Bow River from flooding during winter and ice packing. On average the plant produces around 70,000 megawatt hours per year.

The hydroelectric facility was developed by TransAlta and was the final expansion downstream on the Bow River in Alberta. The Bow River has a total of four hydro plants run by TransAlta, making up the Bow Rivers Electric System. This provides steadiness of electricity at phases of the highest electrical requirements, decreasing effects of shortages.

== Parks and Outdoor Recreation ==
The RGE RD 30 provides an entrance into the Bearspaw loop which is a natural civic reserve location which has a constructed pathway for walking, it follows along the natural habitats of the local area. Big Hill Springs Provincial Park is position in a northeast direction of Cochrane along Range Road 34A off Highway 567, it has natural areas of foothills, parklands and a large swing with a sequence of waterfalls. Glenbow Ranch Provincial Park is made up of over 1,300 hectares of foothills parkland, it is found between Calgary and Cochrane, along the North edge of the Bow River. Situated far to the northwest of Calgary at Tuscany is the twelve mile Coulee, it is a total of 190 hectares of natural park with several hiking tracks.

== Flora ==
Jack Pine (Pinus banksiana) is a shrub-like tree about 5-10m in height, but at times can reach up to 20m in height depending on surroundings. The bark of a Jack Pine is a reddish brown colour which separates into either furrows or irregular scaly ridges. The leaves are between 2–4 cm long of a yellowish-green colour and of an atypical shape, generally curled.

Manitoba Maple (Acer negundo) grows up to 12m tall, possess coarse grey bark and its trunk quickly separates into widely distributing branches. Its trigs are covered with fine soft hairs and of a light green colour. The Manitoba Maple has leaflets which are seen before the leaves from lateral buds.

Laurel Leaf Willow (Salix pentandra) either seen as a small or medium-sized tree that commonly appears shrub-like. It has bark of a greyish-brown colour with branches that are elastic, long and ascend upwards. Laurel Leaf Willow is known to leaf out in early Spring, typically it is one of the first trees to do so, and the last in Autumn to go through abscission.

Balsam Fir (Abies balsamea) can reach up to 18m tall, its leaves are between 18-25mm long with the apex of the leaves being jagged or rounded.

Beaked Hazelnut (Corylus cornuta) is a 1-3m shrub, its leaves are ovate-oblong to oblong-obovate, while being circular to relatively heart-shaped at the base. They are known to flower in early Spring.

Tamarack (Larix laricina) generally grows to around 20m and considered to be of medium size. An adult Tamarack has scaly, reddish-brown bark, compared to a young Tamarack which has bark that is smooth and grey. Its leaves tend to reach between 10-25mm in length and are a pale green colour, except during fall when they become bright yellow.

Lodgepole Pine (Pinus contorta) is a tall tree, normally of between 20-30m but can exceed this height. Leaves tend to form thick groups when reaching the ends of the twigs and are normally less curled and longer than that of the Jack Pine.

Pink False Dandelion (Agoseris lackschewitzii) is a pink colour both while in bud and when flowering, they can grow anywhere between 6–35 cm tall and have hairs along their entire length.

Long-Leaved Arnica (Arnica longifolia) is an orange or yellow, 8-11 petalled flower head with a diameter of 2 cm, the Long-Leaved Arnica grows leaves in pairs that are on opposite sides to each other with the largest growing towards the middle of the stem. It can grow anywhere between 30 and 60 cm when fully grown.

== Fauna ==
=== Herbivores ===
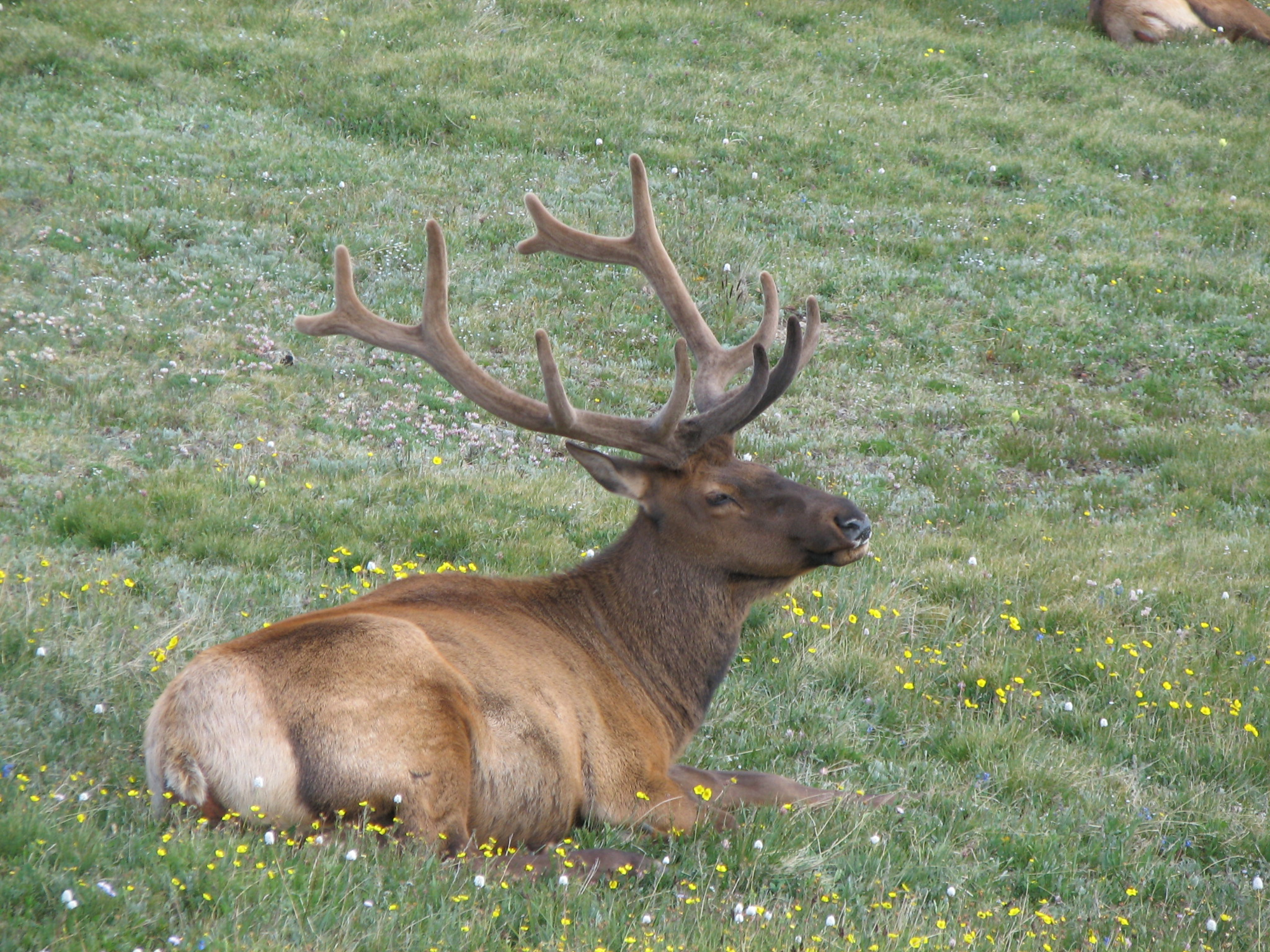
Elk

White-tail deer (Odpcoileus virginianus) have a defining characteristic of the underside of their tail having white fur, the rest of their coat is reddish brown during summer and a greyish brown in winter. The males also have antlers which grow between Summer and Autumn. The average weight of a White-Tail Deer is between 50 and 136 kg.

Mule deer (Odocoileus hemionus) is recognised by their black tipped tail and large ears. are medium-sized, with their name originating from their "mule-like" ears. They are known to have prominent fur and the males, large antlers. The Mule Deer in Alberta on average weigh around 113–136 kg.

Moose (Alces alces) are easily distinguishable by their flat, wide sideways shooting antlers and huge front muzzle. It is black, has immense size and long legs which make it the largest member of the deer family. Male Moose weigh an average of 450 kg whereas the females have an average weight of 350 kg.

Elk (Cervus canadensis) normally are located along the Rocky Mountains of Alberta, following the Moose, the Elk the second largest member of the deer family. Their colours can vary, they tend to have dark brown fur in Winter and reddish brown fur during Summer. The males have a lighter coat of fur on their rump compared to the darker colour on their head and neck. Male Elk also grown very large antlers. The average weight of Elk in Alberta is anywhere between 300 and 350 kg.

North American beaver (Castor canadensis) in North America are the largest rodent, since they can grow between 16 and 30 kg and 80 cm in length. Beavers have fur which is a greyish brown colour on the outer, with thick underfur to keep the water off their skin. They are common to areas with rivers, lakes, streams, marshes or ponds.

=== Carnivores ===
Coyotes (Canis latrans) are normally sized between that of wolves and foxes, the average weight of the males is between 9–23 kg and for females is 7–18 kg. They have long fur which generally resembles grey, yellowish brown or a russet colour. Coyotes also have large pointed ears, hairy tails, flat foreheads and a slim muzzle.

Cougars (Puma concolor) can have differing colours of fur, from dark brown to orangish brown, but usually with white fur on their throat, chest and stomach. They are identified for their long tails which have a black tip and large front paws. The average weight for males is anywhere between 60 and 100 kg and for females 35–60 kg.

Canada lynx (Lynx canadensis) have thick silvery brown fur, they have small bodies, long legs and short tails which have a black tip. They can be distinguished with their triangular ears which have long tufts of hair on them. The approximate average weight for Lynx is between 8–14 kg.

Grizzly bears (Ursus arctos horribilis) were once common to many areas of Alberta but are now restricted to zones in forested areas and the Rocky Mountains. They are of a larger size than black bears, normally with a lighter brown colour. They have a big shoulder lump and curved claw. They can weigh amounts exceeding 315 kg, males can reach 770 kg and females can reach 360 kg.

American black bears (Ursus americanus) have a more extensive area in which they live compared to grizzly bears but are normally located in forested areas. They are of a smaller size than that of the Grizzly Bear, their fur is a dark colour and they have claws which are straight. The average weight for males is between 115 and 270 kg and for females is 92–140 kg.

=== Birds ===
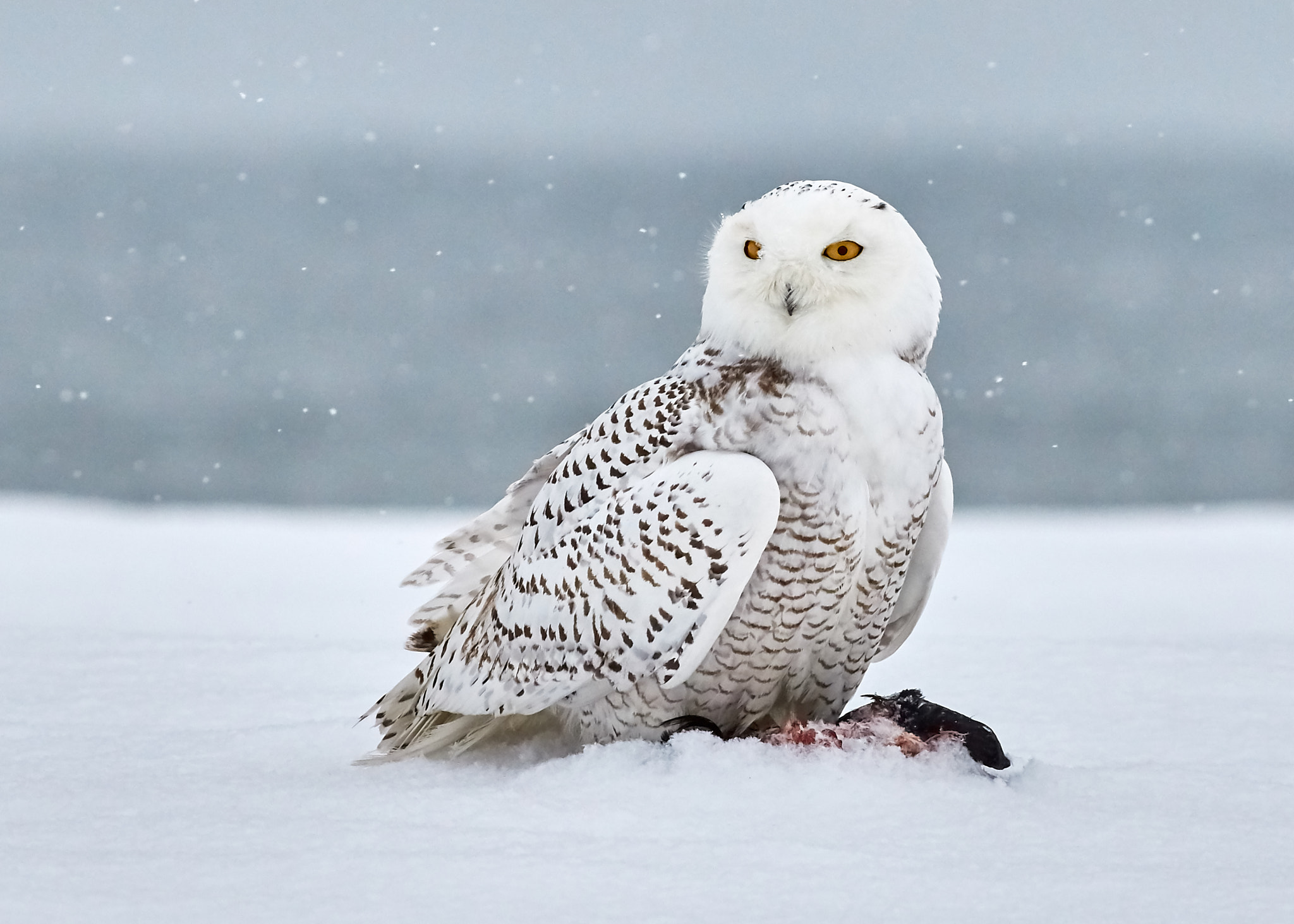
Snowy Owl

Common redpolls (Carduelis flammea) can be easily spotted because of its bright red feathers on its forehead and black feathers on its chin. Males have a patch of pink on their chest with the rest of their feathers made up of streaks of brown compared to the females which lacks only the pink chest. Both of the sexes have an average weight of 11-20g and a length of 12–14 cm

Snowy owls (Bubo scandiacus) can be found within the Bearspaw area during the winter; they have circular heads with large bodies and are covered with thick feathering. They are primarily white but also have brown or black spots and the females tend to have more spots than the males which are normally paler. They can weigh up to an average of 1.6-2.9 kg with a length of somewhere between 52 and 71 cm.

Bald eagles (Haliaeetus leucocephalus) have physical characteristics of sharp talons and a yellow, curved beak. The adults have white feathers covering their heads and tails with brown feathers covering their bodies. The males can grow to 76 cm in height and normally weigh between 3–4 kg. The females can reach 102 cm in height and have a weight of up to 7 kg.

Pine grosbeaks (Pinicola enucleator) have grey feathers covering their bodies, with the males also having the addition of red feathers covering them, in contrast to the females, who instead have the addition of yellow feathers. On average the pine grosbeak will grow to a length of 20-20.5 cm and weigh between 52-78g.

Downy woodpeckers (Picoides pubescens) have wings with black feathers and white spots; they have black and white lined feathers on their heads and a central white stripe down their chests. The males also have a red patch towards the back of their heads. Both of the sexes have an average weight of 21-28g and can grow to a length of anywhere between 14 and 17 cm.
