= Rocky View County =

Municipal district in Alberta, Canada

Rocky View County Municipal District of Rocky View No. 44 (1956–2009) Municipal District of Calgary No. 44 (1955–1956)
- Municipal district
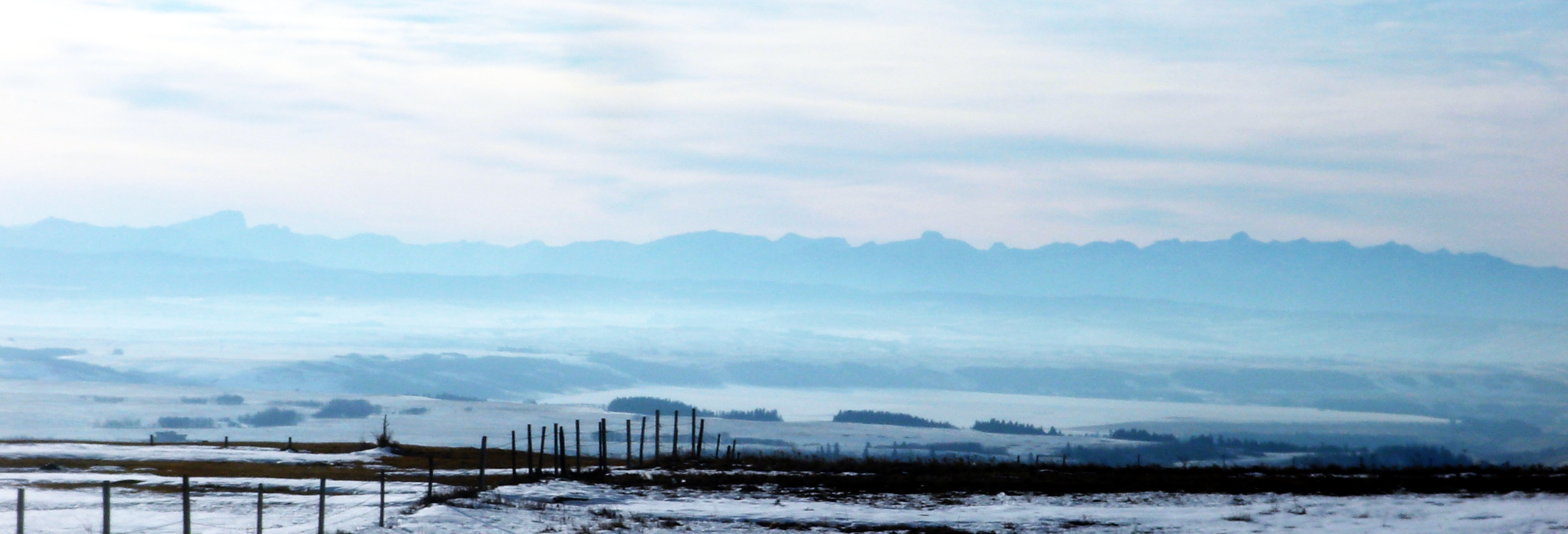
- View of the Rockies and Foothills

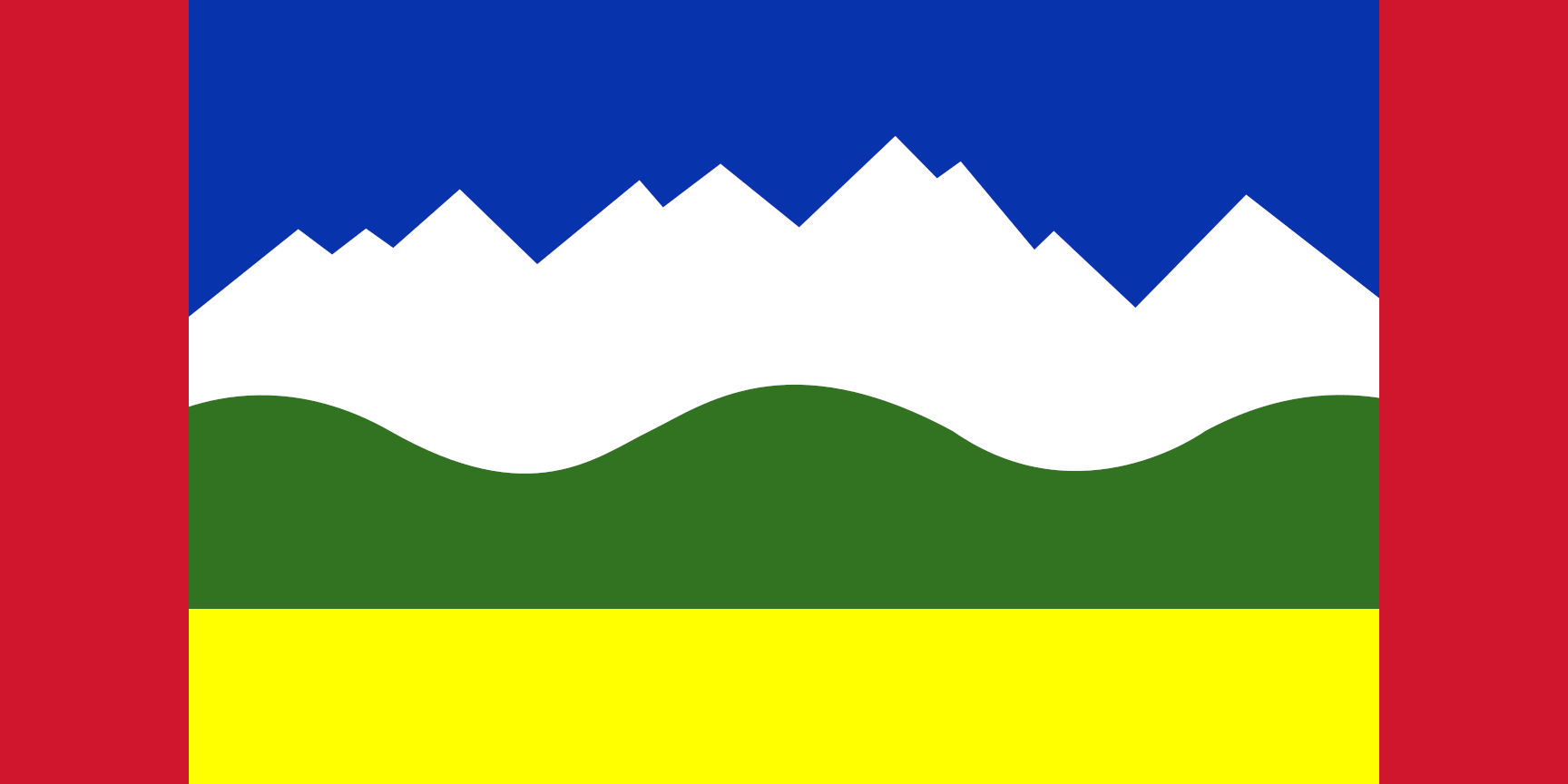
- Flag Logo

- Major communities

- Location within Alberta
- Country: Canada
- Province: Alberta
- Planning region: South Saskatchewan
- Metropolitan area: Calgary
- Incorporated: January 1, 1955
- Name changed: January 9, 1956; June 24, 2009
- Administrative office: Balzac

Government
  - Reeve: Sunny Samra
  - Councillors: Kevin Hanson, Don Kochan, Alison Whiting, Samanntha Wright, Greg Boehlke, Ken Ball

Area (2021)
  - Land: 3,828.85 km^{2} (1,478.33 sq mi)

Population (2021)
  - Total: 41,028
  - Density: 10.7/km^{2} (28/sq mi)
- Time zone: UTC−06:00 (Alberta Time)
- Forward sortation area: T1Z
- Website: rockyview.ca

Rocky View County is a municipal district in southern Alberta, Canada that is named for its views of the nearby Rocky Mountains to the west. It surrounds most of Calgary, forming the city's northern boundary and most of the city's western and eastern boundaries. At a population of 41,028 in 2021, Rocky View County is the most populous municipal district in Alberta. Though predominantly rural in nature, Rocky View County is home to 14 hamlets, including Langdon, one of Alberta's most populous hamlets. Its rural areas are home to numerous country residential subdivisions.

== History ==
The Municipal District (MD) of Calgary No. 44 was originally formed on January 1, 1955 from part of Improvement District No. 46 and parts of five municipal districts – the MD of Serviceberry No. 43, the MD of Conrich No. 44, the MD of Springbank No. 45, the MD of Kneehill No. 48, and the MD of Mountain View No. 49. The MD of Calgary No. 44 was renamed the MD of Rocky View No. 44 on January 9, 1956.

"Rocky View" was the successful entry selected in December 1955, in a local competition to rename the newly formed municipal district. The entry was submitted by Leslie Burwash of Balzac. "Bow View" and "Chinook" placed second and third respectively in the competition. The name "Rocky View" was successful due to its descriptive nature as most areas within the MD of Rocky View No. 44 have views of the Rocky Mountains to the west.

The MD of Rocky View No. 44 changed its name to Rocky View County on June 24, 2009.

On July 28, 2020, Rocky View County applied to the Province of Alberta to change its municipal classification from an MD to a Specialized Municipality, like Strathcona County near Edmonton. This request was subsequently denied by the Province.

== Geography ==
=== Communities and localities ===
The following urban municipalities border Rocky View County.

Cities

- Airdrie
- Chestermere

Towns

- Cochrane
- Crossfield
- Irricana

Villages

- Beiseker

Summer villages

- none

The following hamlets are located within Rocky View County.

Hamlets

- Balzac
- Bottrel
- Bragg Creek
- Cochrane Lake
- Conrich
- Dalemead
- Dalroy
- Delacour
- Harmony
- Indus
- Janet
- Kathyrn
- Keoma
- Langdon
- Madden

The following localities are located within Rocky View County.

Localities

- Allandale Estates
- Anatapy
- Artists View East Subdivision
- Artists View Park West (designated place) or Artists View West Subdivision
- Banded Peak Place
- Bearspan Heights
- Bearspaw
- Bennett
- Braemore Ranch
- Caldbeck
- Calling Horse Estates
- Camp Gardner
- Circle Five
- Colpitts Ranch Subdivision
- Country Estates
- Craigdhu
- Croxford Estates
- Cullen Creek
- Deerwood Estates
- Del-Rich Meadows
- Elbow River Estates
- Elk Valley Park
- Entheos West
- Fawnhill
- Garden Heights
- Georgian Estates
- Ghost Dam
- Glenbow
- Green Valley Place
- Helmsdale
- High Point Estates (designated place)
- Idlewood Estates
- Inverlake
- Kersey
- Lake Erie Estates
- Lansdowne Estates
- Livingstone Estates
- Mitford
- Mount View Estates
- Mountain View Estates
- Murray Acres Estates
- Nier
- Norfolk
- O'Neil Ranchettes
- Partridge Place
- Pinebrook Estates
- Pirmez Creek
- Prairie Royale
- Radnor
- River Ridge Estates
- Robertson
- Rocky View
- Rolling Range Estates
- Rosewood
- Springbank Meadows
- Springgate Estates
- Springland Estates
- Springshire Estates
- Toki Estates
- Tower Ridge Estates
- West Bluff Road Subdivision
- Wild Rose Country Estates
- Wildcat
- Williams Subdivision
- Wintergreen

Other places

- Bearspaw-Glendale (country residential area)
- Elbow Valley (country residential area)
- Heritage Woods (designated place)
- Springbank (country residential area)

== Demographics ==
Religion in Rocky View County (2021)
1. Christian (49.3%)
2. Sikh (4.50%)
3. Muslim (2.10%)
4. Hindu (0.60%)
5. Jewish (0.40%)
6. Buddhist (0.40%)
7. Indigenous (0.10%)
8. Other (0.50%)
9. Irreligious (42.1%)

In the 2021 Census of Population conducted by Statistics Canada, Rocky View County had a population of 41,028 living in 13,905 of its 14,714 total private dwellings, a change of 4.1% from its 2016 population of 39,407. With a land area of 3,828.85 km^{2} (1,478.33 sq mi), it had a population density of 10.7/km^{2} (27.8/sq mi) in 2021.

In the 2016 Census of Population conducted by Statistics Canada, Rocky View County had a population of 39,407 living in 13,042 of its 13,620 total private dwellings, a 10.2% change from its 2011 population of 35,754. With a land area of 3,836.33 km^{2} (1,481.22 sq mi), it had a population density of 10.3/km^{2} (26.6/sq mi) in 2016.

Rocky View County's 2013 municipal census counted a population of 38,055, a 6.4% increase over its adjusted 2011 federal census population of 35,754. Its previous 2006 municipal census counted a population of 34,597.

== Attractions ==
- Big Hill Springs Provincial Park
- Bragg Creek Community Centre and historic downtown
- Bragg Creek Provincial Park
- Calaway Park
- Century Downs Racetrack and Casino
- CrossIron Mills
- Glenbow Ranch Provincial Park
- Pioneer Acres Museum

== Government ==
=== Municipal ===
Rocky View County has a council consisting of elected officials representing seven electoral divisions. Municipal elections, organized under the Alberta Elections Act from Alberta Municipal Affairs, are held every four years, the last being in October, 2025.

Each October, the councillors elect a Reeve and a Deputy Reeve from among their number.

The Rocky View Council consists of:

- Kevin Hanson - Division 1: Southwest Rocky View County - Elbow Valley, Bragg Creek
- Don Kochan, - Division 2: West Rocky View County - Springbank
- Alison Whiting - Division 3: West Rocky View County - Cochrane Lake, South Bearspaw, Glendale
- Samanntha Wright, Deputy Reeve - Division 4: Northwest Rocky View County - North Bearspaw, Bottrell, Madden
- Greg Boehlke - Division 5: Northeast Rocky View County - Kathryn, Keoma, surrounding Airdrie and Crossfield
- Sunny Samra, Reeve - Division 6: East Rocky View County - Conrich, Dalroy, Indus, Janet
- Ken Ball - Division 7: Hamlet of Langdon

=== Provincial ===
Rocky View County is served by the Provincial Electoral Divisions of Airdrie, Chestermere-Rocky View and Olds-Didsbury-Three Hills.

Rocky View is currently represented in the Alberta Legislature by MLA Angela Pitt in the riding of Airdrie, Chantelle De Jonge in Chestermere-Strathmore and Nathan Cooper in Olds-Didsbury-Three Hills.

=== Federal ===
Rocky View is served by three Federal Electoral Divisions: Crowfoot, Macleod and Wild Rose.

Rocky View's northeast and southeast (east of Calgary, north of the Bow River) is part of the Federal Electoral district (also known as a riding) of Crowfoot. This riding has been represented by Kevin Sorenson, who was originally elected as a member of the Reform Party then again as a member of the Canadian Alliance and currently of the Conservative Party.

Rocky View's southwest (south of the Bow River and west of Calgary) is part of the Federal Electoral district (also known as a riding) of Macleod. This riding has been represented by Ted Menzies, who was originally elected as a member of the Canadian Alliance and currently of the Conservative Party.

Rocky View's northwest is part of the Federal Electoral district (also known as a riding) of Wild Rose. This riding is represented by Blake Richards, who was elected as a member of the Conservative Party on October 14, 2008.

== Infrastructure ==
=== Transportation ===
Highways

Rocky View County is bisected by the Trans-Canada Highway (Highway 1) and Highway 2. Highway 9, a major transportation route between Calgary and Saskatoon, Saskatchewan, also bisects the eastern portion of Rocky View County.

- Highway 1 (TCH)
- Highway 1A
- Highway 2
- Highway 2A
- Highway 8
- Highway 9
- Highway 22
- Highway 22X
- Highway 40
- Highway 68
- Highway 72
- Highway 201
- Highway 560
- Highway 563
- Highway 564
- Highway 566
- Highway 567
- Highway 574

Railways

The main lines of the Canadian Pacific Kansas City (CPKC) and the Canadian National Railway (CNR) between Calgary and Edmonton travel through Rocky View County. The CPKC main line is routed through the City of Airdrie and the Town of Crossfield, while the CNR main line is routed through the Town of Irricana and the Village of Beiseker.

Airports

Two airports are located within Rocky View County – Beiseker Airport and Springbank Airport, while airports in Calgary and Airdrie are also in close proximity.

== See also ==
- List of communities in Alberta
- List of municipal districts in Alberta
